= List of beaches in South Africa =

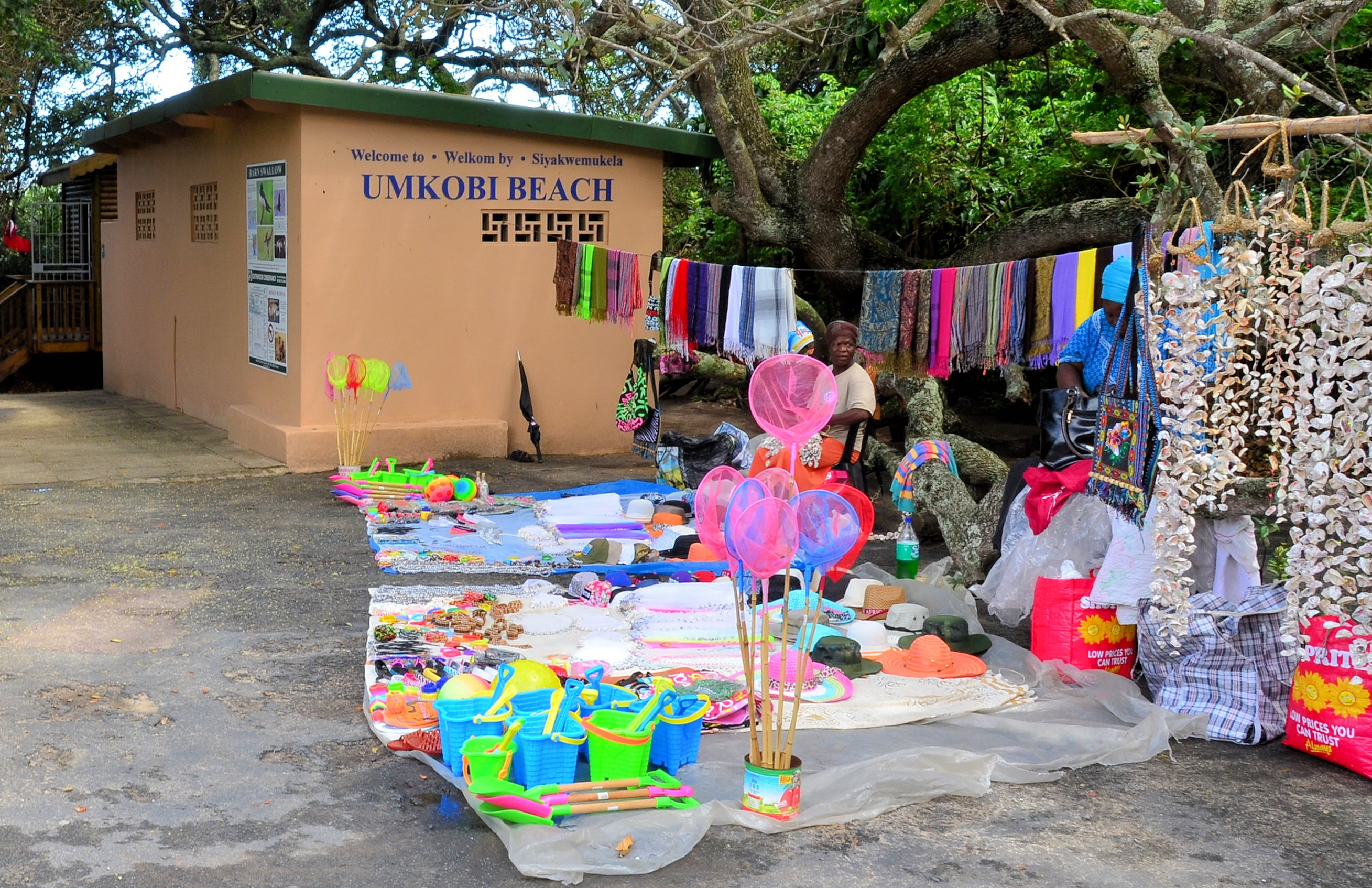
Street vendor in Umkobi Beach in Southbroom, KwaZulu-Natal Province

The following is a list of beaches in South Africa. There are many wide, sandy beaches along the coast of the Eastern Cape of South Africa. The coastline of the Western Cape has a mix of sandy beaches, as well as secluded coves and cliffs above the ocean.

Name of Beach	Province	Nearest town	Coördinates	Length in M
Beaches of Cape Town	Western Cape	Cape Town		
Beaches of Durban	KwaZulu-Natal	Durban		
Alkantstrand Beach	KwaZulu-Natal	Richards Bay		
Banana Beach	KwaZulu-Natal	Port Shepstone		
Bazley Beach	KwaZulu-Natal	Bazley		
Black Rock Beach	KwaZulu-Natal	Port Edward		
Bluewater Beach	Eastern Cape	Port Elizabeth		
Blythedale Beach	KwaZulu-Natal	KwaDukuza		
Cape St. Francis Beach	Eastern Cape	Cape St. Francis		
Clarke Bay Beach	KwaZulu-Natal	Ballito		
Compensation Beach	KwaZulu-Natal	Ballito		
Elands Bay Beach	Western Cape	Elands Bay		
Glenmore Beach	KwaZulu-Natal	Port Edward		
Hibberdene Beach	KwaZulu-Natal	Hibberdene		
Ifafa Beach	KwaZulu-Natal	Ifafa Beach		
Ivy Beach	KwaZulu-Natal	Port Edward		
Jeffreys Bay Beach	Eastern Cape	Jeffreys Bay		
Kidds Beach	Eastern Cape	Kidds Beach		
Kidds Beach	KwaZulu-Natal	Port Edward		
King's Beach	Eastern Cape	Port Elizabeth		
Leisure Beach	KwaZulu-Natal	Port Edward		
Lucien Beach	KwaZulu-Natal	Margate		
Manaba Beach	KwaZulu-Natal	Margate		
Margate Main Beach	KwaZulu-Natal	Margate		
Melville Beach	KwaZulu-Natal	Port Shepstone/Hibberdene		
Mtwalume Beach	KwaZulu-Natal	Mtwalume		
New Brighton Beach	Eastern Cape	Port Elizabeth		
Oslo Beach	KwaZulu-Natal	Port Shepstone		
Palm Beach	KwaZulu-Natal	Port Edward		
Pennington Beach	KwaZulu-Natal	Pennington		
Pollok Beach	Eastern Cape	Port Elizabeth		
Port Edward Main Beach	KwaZulu-Natal	Port Edward		
Portobello Beach	KwaZulu-Natal	Port Edward		
Port Shepstone Beach	KwaZulu-Natal	Port Shepstone		
Pumula Beach	KwaZulu-Natal	Hibberdene		
Ramsgate Main Beach	KwaZulu-Natal	Margate		
Ramsgate South Beach	KwaZulu-Natal	Margate		
Rennies Beach	KwaZulu-Natal	Port Edward		
Salmon Bay Beach	KwaZulu-Natal	Port Edward		
Salt Rock Beach	KwaZulu-Natal	Salt Rock		
San Lameer Beach	KwaZulu-Natal	Southbroom		
Scottburgh Beach	KwaZulu-Natal	Scottburgh		
Sea Park Beach	KwaZulu-Natal	Port Shepstone		
Sheffield Beach	KwaZulu-Natal	Ballito		
Shelly Beach	KwaZulu-Natal	Margate		
Silver Beach	KwaZulu-Natal	Port Edward		
Southbroom Main Beach	KwaZulu-Natal	Southbroom		
Southport Beach	KwaZulu-Natal	Port Shepstone		
St Michael's Beach	KwaZulu-Natal	Margate		
Tinley Manor Beach	KwaZulu-Natal	Ballito		
Thompsons Bay Beach	KwaZulu-Natal	Ballito/Shaka's Rock		
T.O. Beach	KwaZulu-Natal	Port Edward		
Trafalgar Beach	KwaZulu-Natal	Southbroom		
Tugela Beach	KwaZulu-Natal	Tugela Mouth		
Tweni Beach	KwaZulu-Natal	Port Shepstone		
Umhlali Beach	KwaZulu-Natal	Ballito		
Umkobi Beach	KwaZulu-Natal	Southbroom		
Umzumbe Beach	KwaZulu-Natal	Hibberdene		
Uvongo Beach	KwaZulu-Natal	Margate		
Willard Beach	KwaZulu-Natal	Ballito		
Windsor on Sea Beach	KwaZulu-Natal	Margate		
Zinkwazi Beach	KwaZulu-Natal	KwaDukuza		

== See also ==
- List of beaches
