= Hibiscus Coast Local Municipality =

Hibiscus Coast
- Former local municipality
- Seal

- Location of Hibiscus Coast Local Municipality within KwaZulu-Natal
- Coordinates: 30°45′S 30°23′E
- Country: South Africa
- Province: KwaZulu-Natal
- District: Ugu
- Seat: Port Shepstone
- Wards: 29

Government
  - Type: Municipal council
  - Mayor: Cynthia Mqwebu

Area
  - Total: 839 km^{2} (324 sq mi)

Population (2011)
  - Total: 256,135
  - Density: 305/km^{2} (791/sq mi)

Racial makeup (2011)
  - Black African: 82.4%
  - Coloured: 1.4%
  - Indian/Asian: 5.1%
  - White: 10.8%

First languages (2011)
  - Zulu: 70.7%
  - English: 14.2%
  - Xhosa: 7.7%
  - Afrikaans: 4.5%
  - Other: 2.9%
- Time zone: UTC+2 (SAST)
- Municipal code: KZN216

Hibiscus Coast Local Municipality was a local municipality in the province of KwaZulu-Natal in South Africa. It governed the Hibiscus Coast on the KwaZulu-Natal South Coast which attracts tourists from the province and other provinces as well as international tourists.

After municipal elections on 3 August 2016 it was merged into the larger Ray Nkonyeni Local Municipality.

Beaches are to be found along the entire seaboard. Hibberdene Beach, Ramsgate Beach, Marina Beach/San Lameer, and Lucien Beach have been recognized as Blue Flag beaches. The climate of the coastal areas is humid and subtropical — comparable to southern Florida in the United States, but not quite as hot and rainy in the summer.

The coastline is dotted with small towns, many of which serve as seasonal recreational hubs, such as Port Shepstone, Umtamvuna / Port Edward, Margate, Hibberdene and Impenjati / Southbroom. These towns feature a wide range of tourist-oriented businesses, including restaurants, bars, clubs, movie houses, golf courses, clothing shops, museums, and various types of accommodations. The income from these businesses has economically benefited the municipality as a whole.

Other economic activities include fishing, agriculture, crafts, and bead works.

The hilly inland regions of the municipality are largely under the ownership of tribal authorities. Such "traditional" settlements include KwaXolo, KwaNzimakwe, KwaNdwalane, KwaMadlala, KwaMavundla and KwaLushaba.

== History ==
Prior to the demise of Apartheid in 1994, the Hibiscus Coast was divided into five main Transitional Local Councils, namely Port Shepstone, Margate, Hibberdene, Southbroom (Impenjati- Southbroom TLC) and Port Edward (Umtamvuna TLC).

== Main places ==
The 2001 census divided the municipality into the following main places:

Place	Code	Area (km^{2})	Population
Anerley	50601	1.2	376
Brevo	50602	0.24	27
Gamalakhe	50603	3.45	13,570
Hibberdene	50604	4.67	1,016
Kwaxolo	50606	167.84	48,024
Lushaba	50607	14.79	8,106
Madlala	50608	33.24	7,896
Marburg	50609	6.78	7,586
Margate	50610	10.05	8,654
Marina Beach	50611	1.13	123
Mavundla	50612	25.49	20,066
Melville	50613	1.17	327
Munster	50615	1.67	114
Nsimbini/Ndwalane	50616	34.77	36,335
Nzimakwe	50617	46.38	22,279
Oslo Beach	50618	3.13	2,052
Port Edward	50619	15.54	2,963
Port Shepstone Part 1	50620	7.67	7,546
Port Shepstone Part 2	50635	8.01	2,090
Pumula	50621	1.92	406
Ramsgate	50622	6.03	1,490
San Lameer	50623	1.75	81
Sea Park	50624	3.1	1,249
Sentombi	50625	7.81	869
Shelly Beach	50626	5.77	2,713
Southbroom	50627	10.3	862
Southport	50628	1.97	959
Sunwich Port	50629	0.5	626
Trafalgar	50630	4.89	424
Umtamvuna Nature Reserve	50614	18.82	21
Umtentweni	50631	10.11	3,445
Umzumbe	50633	2.3	452
Uvongo	50634	10.35	3,879
Remainder of the municipality	50605	358.15	11,130

== Politics ==
The municipal council consisted of fifty-eight members elected by mixed-member proportional representation. Twenty-nine councillors were elected by first-past-the-post voting in twenty-nine wards, while the remaining twenty-nine were chosen from party lists so that the total number of party representatives was proportional to the number of votes received. In the election of 18 May 2011 the African National Congress (ANC) won a majority of forty-one seats on the council. The following table shows the results of the election.

Party	Votes				Seats		
Party	Ward	List	Total	%	Ward	List	Total
ANC	54,658	55,515	110,173	70.2	21	20	41
DA	14,580	14,769	29,349	18.7	8	3	11
IFP	4,526	4,539	9,065	5.8	0	3	3
NFP	2,347	2,189	4,536	2.9	0	2	2
COPE	608	615	1,223	0.8	0	1	1
ACDP	375	442	817	0.5	0	0	0
VF+	356	311	667	0.4	0	0	0
MF	217	197	414	0.3	0	0	0
UDM	219	140	359	0.2	0	0	0
Independent	278	–	278	0.2	0	–	0
Total	78,164	78,717	156,881	100.0	29	29	58
Spoilt votes	1,263	1,000	2,263				
