= Port Shepstone Mall =

Shopping centre in Port Shepstone, South Africa

- Interactive map of the Port Shepstone Mall area

General information
- Location: Port Shepstone, KwaZulu-Natal, South Africa, Corner of Nelson Mandela Drive and Ryder Street
- Coordinates: 30.7400°S 30.4468°E
- Opening: 24 October 2024 (unofficial) / 15 November 2024 (official)
- Cost: R550 million
- Owner: Ray Nkonyeni Local Municipality
- Landlord: Retail Shop Space

Technical details
- Floor count: 4
- Floor area: 23,890 m^{2} (257,100 sq ft)

Design and construction
- Main contractor: Top Dog Construction and Construction ID

Renovating team
- Architect: Winterbach Pretorius Letele Architects

Other information
- Parking: 470

Port Shepstone Mall is a new shopping centre situated in Port Shepstone on the South Coast of KwaZulu-Natal, South Africa.

== Location ==
=== Site ===
Built on the former site of the Port Shepstone Taxi Rank, Port Shepstone Mall is situated on Nelson Mandela Drive at the western entrance into the Port Shepstone CBD, and can also be accessed via Ryder Street and Dick King Road.

=== Catchment ===
The primary catchment area of the shopping centre includes the Lower South Coast which stretches from Port Shepstone to Hibberdene in the north to Margate and Port Edward in the south and Izingolweni to the west. Its secondary catchment area includes nearby towns in the neighbouring Eastern Cape province such as Mbizana and Flagstaff.

== Features ==
The structure of Port Shepstone Mall consists of four levels, all connected by a central core with two lifts and eight escalators.

- Level 0: The main public transport entrance with 203 active taxi bays, 221 long-term taxi bays and 10 bus parking bays, which also links to the adjacent bus rank and an overflow taxi holding area. This entrance will cater for taxis only, their commuters and designated vendor points, which will be allocated at this level.
- Level 1: The main retail level consisting of 12 000sqm of retail space including retail stores, pop-up stores, communal seating and an amphitheatre.
- Level 2: Comprises 12 000 sqm of retail space, mostly notably fashion retailers and banking service providers. It includes a pedestrian entrance on Ryder Street.
- Level 3: Comprises 470 public parking bays (rooftop), which can be accessed onto a ramp from Ryder Street. No taxis will be allowed on the rooftop.

== Tenants ==
Port Shepstone Mall comprises over 65 tenants with anchor tenants including Shoprite, Boxer (the 500th store in South Africa), Clicks and Dis-Chem.

Other notable tenants include:

- ABSA
- Ackermans
- Capitec Bank
- FNB
- KFC
- Mr Price
- Nedbank
- Pep
- The Hub
