= Paddock, South Africa =

Paddock
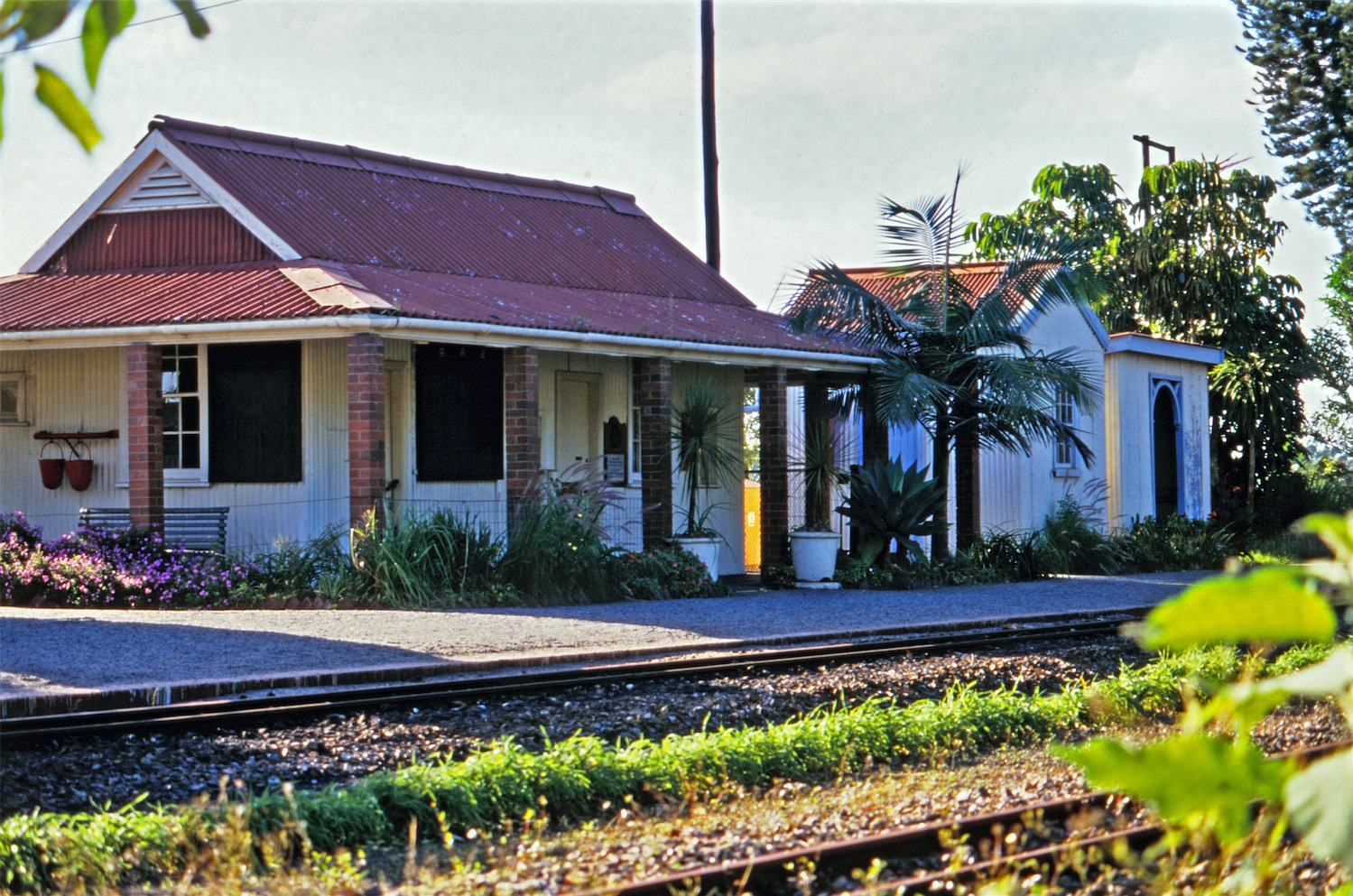
- The disused Paddock Station, which is recognised as a Provincial Heritage Site

- Location within KwaZulu-Natal Location within South Africa
- Coordinates: 30.759152°S 30.249374°E
- Country: South Africa
- Province: KwaZulu-Natal
- District: Ugu
- Municipality: Ray Nkonyeni
- Time zone: UTC+2 (SAST)
- PO box: 4244

Paddock is a small rural settlement on the South Coast of the KwaZulu-Natal province of South Africa. It lies on N2 national road about 24 kilometres (14.9 mi) west of Port Shepstone and 13 kilometres (8.1 mi) north-east of Izingolweni.

Paddock is situated just south of the Oribi Gorge, a canyon cut by the Mzimkulwana River, which is a popular tourist destination on the South Coast especially for tourists seeking adventure and outdoor activities.

== Administration ==
Paddock is administered by the Ray Nkonyeni Local Municipality which governs the Lower South Coast of KwaZulu-Natal. Paddock was previously administered by the Ezinqoleni Local Municipality, however during the 2016 local elections the municipality amalgamated with the Hibiscus Coast Local Municipality to form the new Ray Nkonyeni Local Municipality.

== Overview ==
Paddock is essentially a small farming settlement in the hilly countryside of the Lower South Coast, mostly supported by the surrounding sugarcane and macadamia farms. It mainly involves a group of commercial and residential farms that have been built south of the N2.

Commercial services in the village comprise a Shell service station along the N2, Coastal Farmers Co-Op branch and a farmers club amongst other facilities.

== Economy ==
In recent years, Paddock/Oribi Flats area has been one of the largest investment areas in terms of the booming macadamia industry on the South Coast with the number of macadamia farms and processing facilities increasing in the area. The notable macadamia-related companies that operate around Paddock include Mayo Macs, a South African macadamia processing and marketing company which owns a macadamia processing facility to the east of Paddock and Inter-Agri Oils, a local macadamia nut oil production company has macadamia farms and a processing facility to the north of Paddock.

== Transport ==
=== Rail ===
Paddock once formed part of the Alfred County Railway which was an 2 ft (610 mm) narrow gauge railway which ran from Port Shepstone in the east, through Izotsha in the south-east and Paddock to Harding in the north-west. After the standard gauge Transnet passenger services shut down in 1986, the ACR continued operations until 2005, when the famous Banana Express ceased operation.

=== Roads ===
The N2 connects Paddock with Port Shepstone to the east and with Izingolweni and Kokstad to the north-west. The P55 (Izotsha Road) heads south-east from the N2 towards Izotsha and Shelly Beach.
