= Sea Park, South Africa =

Coastal village in KwaZulu-Natal, South Africa

Sea Park
- Location within KwaZulu-Natal Location within South Africa
- Coordinates: 30.698°S 30.49°E
- Country: South Africa
- Province: KwaZulu-Natal
- District: Ugu
- Municipality: Ray Nkonyeni
- Main Place: Port Shepstone

Area
  - Total: 3.28 km^{2} (1.27 sq mi)

Population (2011)
  - Total: 2,027
  - Density: 618/km^{2} (1,600/sq mi)

Racial makeup (2011)
  - Black African: 31.6%
  - Coloured: 3.3%
  - Indian/Asian: 9.1%
  - White: 55.5%
  - Other: 0.5%

First languages (2011)
  - English: 46.0%
  - Afrikaans: 27.0%
  - Zulu: 19.7%
  - Xhosa: 5.3%
  - Other: 2.0%
- Time zone: UTC+2 (SAST)
- PO box: 4241
- Area code: 039

Sea Park is a coastal suburb situated along the South Coast of KwaZulu-Natal, South Africa. It forms part of the greater area of Port Shepstone in the Ray Nkonyeni Local Municipality.

== Location ==
Sea Park is situated along the coastal R102 route connecting Melville (6 km) to the north with Port Shepstone (5 km) to the south. The Mhlangamkhulu River forms the suburb’s northern boundary, with Southport lying beyond it, while the Mtentweni River marks the southern boundary, beyond which is Umtentweni.
