= Sunwich Port =

Coastal village in KwaZulu-Natal, South Africa

- Location within KwaZulu-Natal Location within South Africa
- Coordinates: 30.665°S 30.511°E
- Country: South Africa
- Province: KwaZulu-Natal
- District: Ugu
- Municipality: Ray Nkonyeni
- Main Place: Port Shepstone

Area
  - Total: 0.70 km^{2} (0.27 sq mi)

Population (2011)
  - Total: 820
  - Density: 1,200/km^{2} (3,000/sq mi)

Racial makeup (2011)
  - Black African: 36.0%
  - Coloured: 2.1%
  - Indian/Asian: 2.8%
  - White: 58.6%
  - Other: 0.5%

First languages (2011)
  - English: 4.0%
  - Zulu: 26.7%
  - Afrikaans: 24.0%
  - Xhosa: 6.1%
  - Other: 1.2%
- Time zone: UTC+2 (SAST)
- PO box: 4230
- Area code: 039

Sunwich Port is a coastal village situated along the South Coast of KwaZulu-Natal, South Africa and north of the Domba River. The quiet and small coastal village forms part of the greater area of Port Shepstone.

== Geography ==
Sunwich Port is situated along the R102 regional route, approximately halfway between Port Shepstone (11 km) to the south-west and Hibberdene (13 km) to the north-east. It is neighboured by Melville to the north and Anerley to the south.
