= Marburg, South Africa =

Marburg
- Location within KwaZulu-Natal Location within South Africa
- Coordinates: 30°43′S 30°23′E
- Country: South Africa
- Province: KwaZulu-Natal
- District: Ugu
- Municipality: Ray Nkonyeni
- Main Place: Port Shepstone

Area
  - Total: 1.5 km^{2} (0.58 sq mi)

Population (2011)
  - Total: 1,355
  - Density: 900/km^{2} (2,300/sq mi)

Racial makeup (2011)
  - Black African: 9.1%
  - Coloured: 3.4%
  - Indian/Asian: 87.0%
  - White: 0.1%
  - Other: 0.4%

First languages (2011)
  - English: 88.3%
  - Zulu: 6.1%
  - Xhosa: 2.0%
  - Afrikaans: 1.9%
  - Other: 1.7%
- Time zone: UTC+2 (SAST)
- PO box: 4252

Marburg is a settlement in the Ugu District Municipality in the KwaZulu-Natal province of South Africa, situated approximately 112 kilometres south-west of the city of Durban. Marburg was a Norwegian settlement given the name Marburg for a nearby German mission. The Norwegian founders played a significant role in the development of Marburg and Port Shepstone, which it forms part of today. The British colonial government gave the settlers a free voyage to South Africa and also houses and 100 acres of land. Marburg was the only successful Scandinavian settlement in South Africa.

Marburg was established in 1882 by Norwegian immigrants and was likely named after Marburg, a city 74 km north of Frankfurt in Germany.

== History ==
=== Norwegian founding ===
The Land and Immigration Board contemplated bringing German settlers to the Marburg area in 1881, but met opposition from the German government. Consequentially, immigration agent Walter Peace suggested promoting settlement in Marburg by Norwegians. On July 20, 1882, the first Norwegians ventured aboard the steamship Lapland for their 39-day voyage from Hull, England to Mzimkulu near Port Shepstone, South Africa. Arriving in Africa on August 28, 1882, the Norwegians were brought ashore the following day. The 246 Norwegians onboard Lapland were first and foremost fishermen, but slowly adjusted to the agrarian lifestyle at their 100-acre agricultural Marburg community.

Many of the original 1882 founders later left Marburg, including ten families which left for Australia. However, a number remained in South Africa though not all remained in Marburg. A number joined the Norwegian community in Durban, while others went to Johannesburg and other parts near Alfred County.

Emigration to South Africa from Norway in 1876-85 was dominated by emigrants from Møre og Romsdal, and more specifically, from Sunnmøre. Marburg's founders were first and foremost from Ålesund in Sunnmøre.

When Marburg settlers celebrated their 50th anniversary in 1932, there were twenty Norwegian families left in town. 84 original settlers were still alive, and the Norwegian community had produced 208 children, 425 grandchildren, and 130 great-grandchildren.

=== Apartheid era ===
In 1950, the Group Areas Act. racially divided Port Shepstone similar to many other towns and cities in South Africa in which Marburg was classified as the "Indian area" of Port Shepstone. Marburg was one of the four Indian proclaimed townships in the KwaZulu-Natal province and its neighbouring suburb of Merlewood to the west was classified as the "Coloured area" of Port Shepstone.

== Geography ==
Marburg is situated approximately 3 kilometres (2 mi) west of the Port Shepstone CBD and is bounded by the N2 freeway to the east. The suburb is situated among other suburbs such as Merlewood, Grosvenor, Umbango, Protea Park and Albersville.

== Industries ==
Marburg is the only major industrial node on the South Coast of KwaZulu-Natal, home to a number of service-sector businesses particularly in the automotive and hardware retail sector.

== Transport ==
Marburg lies at the meeting point of three major routes (N2, R61 and R102) known as the Marburg Interchange, which includes the Oribi Toll Plaza (charging motorists on the N2 and R61 while the R102 is designated as an untolled alternative route).

- N2 – It diverges at Marburg, heading north to Durban and west to Harding and Kokstad
- R102 (Harding Road) – As the older section of the N2 and the alternative toll-free route to the N2, it connects Marburg with the Port Shepstone CBD and Melville to the north-east.
- R61 (future N2 Wild Coast Toll Route) – connects Marburg with Margate and Port Edward to the south.

Marburg is also accessed by the following secondary routes:

- Main Harding Road – provides direct connection between N2 (from Kokstad) to the Port Shepstone CBD
- Izotsha Road – connects Marburg with Izotsha and Gamalakhe to the south
- Oscar Borcherds Road – connects Marburg with Protea Park to the north and the Umzimkhulu Sugar Mill to the north-west.
