= Anerley, South Africa =

Anerley
- Location within KwaZulu-Natal Location within South Africa
- Coordinates: 30.670°S 30.503°E
- Country: South Africa
- Province: KwaZulu-Natal
- District: Ugu
- Municipality: Ray Nkonyeni
- Main Place: Port Shepstone

Area
  - Total: 1.22 km^{2} (0.47 sq mi)

Population (2011)
  - Total: 630
  - Density: 520/km^{2} (1,300/sq mi)

Racial makeup (2011)
  - Black African: 27.7%
  - Coloured: 0.6%
  - Indian/Asian: 4.5%
  - White: 67.1%
  - Other: 0.2%

First languages (2011)
  - English: 48.6%
  - Afrikaans: 26.2%
  - Zulu: 14.3%
  - Xhosa: 9.5%
  - Other: 1.4%
- Time zone: UTC+2 (SAST)
- PO box: 4230
- Area code: 039

Anerley is a coastal village situated along the South Coast of KwaZulu-Natal, South Africa.

The village is a holiday resort some 111 km (69 mi) south-west of Durban and 10 km (6 mi) north-east of Port Shepstone Central and is said to be named after Anerley, a district in the south-east of London.

== Geography ==
Anerley is situated along the R102 regional route between Port Shepstone and Melville and is bordered by Sunwich Port to the north and Southport to the south.

Although Anerley forms part of the greater area of Port Shepstone, it does not share the same postal code as the town (4240). Instead, it has its own postal code (4230) in which it shares with Prairie Park, Southport and Sunwich Port.
