= Boboyi =

Settlement in KwaZulu-Natal, South Africa

- Location within KwaZulu-Natal Location within South Africa
- Coordinates: 30°44′05″S 30°23′35″E
- Country: South Africa
- Province: KwaZulu-Natal
- District: Ugu
- Municipality: Ray Nkonyeni

Area
  - Total: 3.56 km^{2} (1.37 sq mi)

Population (2011)
  - Total: 6,915
  - Density: 1,940/km^{2} (5,030/sq mi)

Racial makeup (2011)
  - Black African: 99.0%
  - Coloured: 0.5%
  - Indian/Asian: 0.3%
  - White: 0.1%
  - Other: 0.1%

First languages (2011)
  - Zulu: 83.6%
  - Xhosa: 8.9%
  - Ndebele: 2.3%
  - English: 2.3%
  - Other: 2.9%
- Time zone: UTC+2 (SAST)
- Postal code (street): 4240
- PO box: 4253

Boboyi, or Bhobhoyi, is a peri-urban settlement in KwaZulu-Natal, South Africa. It is located 8 kilometres (5 mi) west of Port Shepstone and is named after the Boboyi River which runs through the area.

The area is surrounded by Murchison, Mobatsha and Merlewood and is situated along the N2 national road between Port Shepstone and eZinqoleni.

== History ==
Boboyi along with its neighbour of Murchison were formed under the Nsimbini Tribal Authority which became part of the KwaZulu bantustan. The little homeland budget designated for development shows that there was very little service delivery in these area which is still prevalent till this day. Post-apartheid (from 1994), the village was included into the province of KwaZulu-Natal and in 2000 it was placed under the local governance of the Hibiscus Coast Local Municipality (now Ray Nkonyeni Local Municipality) and Ugu District Municipality.
