= Murchison, KwaZulu-Natal =

Murchison
- Location within KwaZulu-Natal Location within South Africa
- Coordinates: 30°43′S 30°21′E
- Country: South Africa
- Province: KwaZulu-Natal
- District: Ugu
- Municipality: Ray Nkonyeni

Area
  - Total: 4.73 km^{2} (1.83 sq mi)

Population (2011)
  - Total: 8,352
  - Density: 1,770/km^{2} (4,570/sq mi)

Racial makeup (2011)
  - Black African: 99.0%
  - Coloured: 0.7%
  - Indian/Asian: 0.2%
  - White: 0.04%
  - Other: 0.08%

First languages (2011)
  - Zulu: 92.8%
  - Xhosa: 2.4%
  - English: 2.4%
  - Ndebele: 1.2%
  - Other: 1.1%
- Time zone: UTC+2 (SAST)
- PO box: 4250

Murchison is a peri-urban settlement in the Ugu District Municipality in KwaZulu-Natal, South Africa.

== Geography ==
Murchison is located on the South Coast of KwaZulu-Natal, approximately 13 kilometres (8 mi) west of Port Shepstone. It borders the villages of Madakana, Mbotsha, Mdlanzi, Mtengwana and Boboyi.

== Health facilities ==
Murchison is home to the Murchison District Hospital which is a 300-bed public hospital serving the surrounding rural district. The hospital was opened in 1943 by Mr D. Mitchell.

== Roads ==
Murchison lies on the N2 national route connecting Port Shepstone to the east with Kokstad (via Ezinqoleni and Harding) to the west.
