= Umtentweni =

Coastal village in KwaZulu-Natal, South Africa

- eMthenteni
- Location within KwaZulu-Natal Location within South Africa
- Coordinates: 30°43′S 30°28′E
- Country: South Africa
- Province: KwaZulu-Natal
- District: Ugu
- Municipality: Ray Nkonyeni
- Main Place: Port Shepstone

Area
  - Total: 8.29 km^{2} (3.20 sq mi)

Population (2011)
  - Total: 4,383
  - Density: 529/km^{2} (1,370/sq mi)

Racial makeup (2011)
  - Black African: 19.7%
  - Coloured: 2.6%
  - Indian/Asian: 7.7%
  - White: 69.3%
  - Other: 0.7%

First languages (2011)
  - English: 64.7%
  - Afrikaans: 21.3%
  - Zulu: 8.6%
  - Xhosa: 2.8%
  - Other: 2.6%
- Time zone: UTC+2 (SAST)
- Postal code (street): 4235
- PO box: 4235
- Area code: 039

Umtentweni, also officially known as eMthenteni, is a small coastal resort on the South Coast of KwaZulu-Natal, South Africa, between the Mzimkulu River (the great home of all rivers) and the Mtentweni River (named after a species of grass that grows on its banks). It forms part of the coastal town of Port Shepstone in the Ray Nkonyeni Local Municipality (part of the Ugu District Municipality), KwaZulu-Natal, South Africa. It is a relatively clean and quiet residential resort; it has become an attractive destination for people aiming to get away from city life. Most of the village is filled with complexes, flats, bed and breakfasts and suburban-style houses. Twenty years ago the whole of Umtentweni consisted of a lot of greenery and wildlife. All this has changed due to the growing popularity of this small resort and the constant clearing for new housing.

The Port Shepstone Country Club is also located in Umtentweni on the banks of the Mzimkhulu River. There is also a public beach, a whale deck and a tennis club.

== Name change ==
As of 10 February 2006, the coastal resort was officially renamed from "eMtentweni" to "eMthenteni" as part of the government's renaming scheme by the South African Geographical Names Council. However, the name change has largely been ignored with road signs and usage of the old name "Umtentweni" or "eMtentweni" still being used.

== Geography ==
Umtentweni is located on elevated land overlooking the Indian Ocean, densely covered by subtropical vegetation that stretches the entirety of the Hibiscus Coast. It is situated between the Mtentweni River to the north, beyond which lies Sea Park and the Mzimkhulu River to the south, beyond which lies Port Shepstone.

== Transport ==
=== Roads ===
Umtentweni is situated along the R102 connecting Melville to the north with Port Shepstone CBD to the south. The area also lies just off the N2 highway connecting Marburg to the south-west with Durban to the north-east. Running north-west, Rethman Drive connects the suburb with St Faith’s and provides access to the N2.

==== Tolling ====
The N2, forming part of the South Coast Toll Route, involves the payment of toll at the tollgates of the Umtentweni Ramp Toll Plaza, situated on the northern on and off-ramps of the Rethman Drive interchange (Exit 51). Traffic arriving from the north to turn off at exit 51 and traffic joining the N2 N from Rethman Drive must pass through the respective ramp tollgates. The R102 to Melville and Port Shepstone Central serves as the untolled alternative route to the N2.
