= Izotsha =

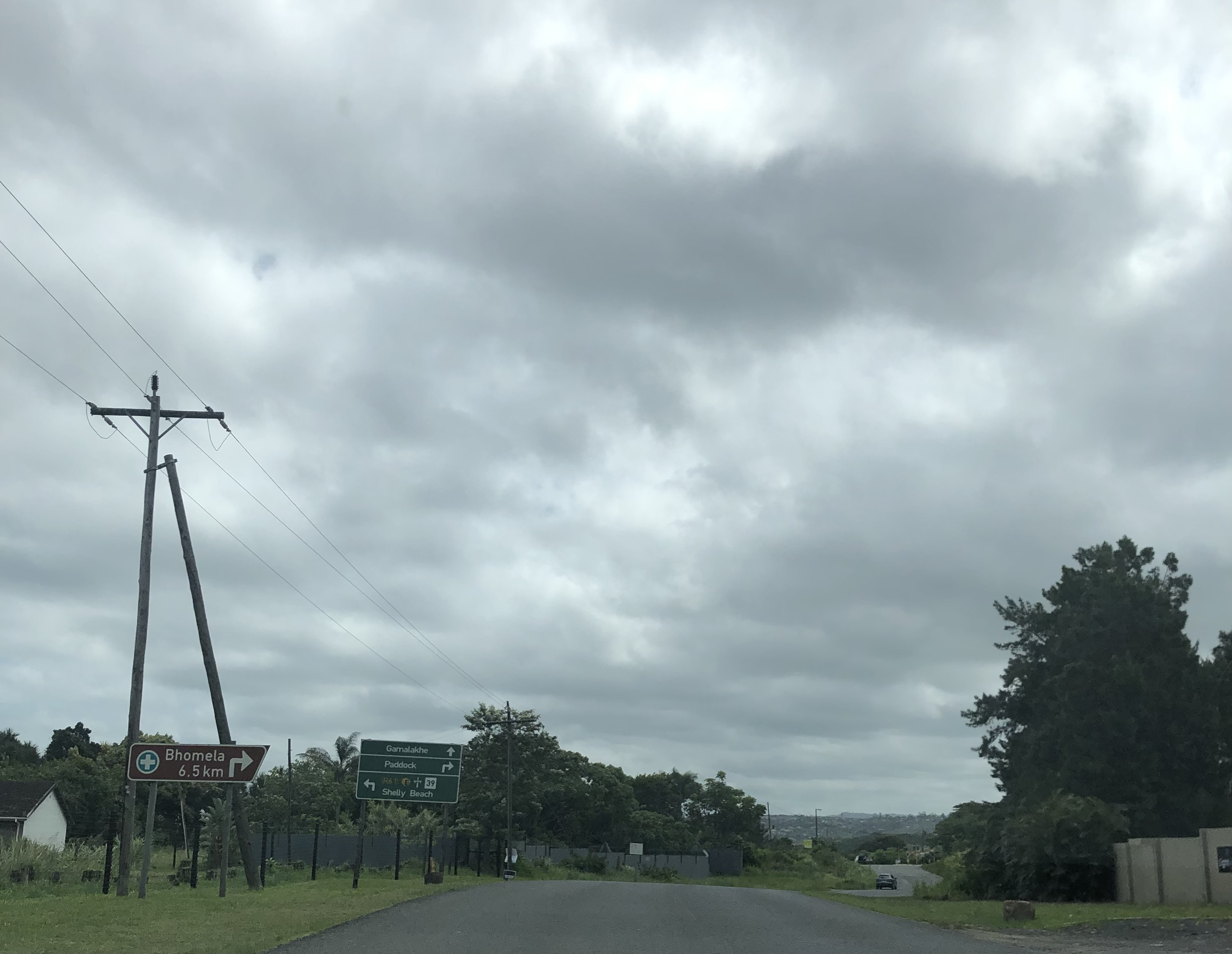
- The P200 Izotsha Road approaching the intersection with the P55 in Izotsha

- Location within KwaZulu-Natal Location within South Africa
- Coordinates: 30.780483°S 30.39226°E
- Country: South Africa
- Province: KwaZulu-Natal
- District: Ugu
- Municipality: Ray Nkonyeni
- Time zone: UTC+2 (SAST)
- PO box: 4242

Izotsha is a small rural settlement on the South Coast of the KwaZulu-Natal province of South Africa, just inland from Shelly Beach and approximately 7 kilometres (4.3 mi) south-west of Port Shepstone. The name ‘Izotsha’ translates to 'it will burn’ the Xhosa language.

== Overview ==
Izotsha is essentially a small settlement that mainly involves a group of commercial and residential farms as well as light industrial property that have been built around the P55 and P200 roads. It also forms part of the Izotsha Industrial Development Corridor which is a series of small industrial activity stretching along the section of the P200 Izotsha Road from Izotsha to Marburg.

== Geography ==
Located in the hilly countryside of the Lower South Coast, Izotsha lies just south of the Zotsha River after which it is named after. The village is positioned approximately 3 kilometres (1.9 mi) north-west of Shelly Beach and 5 kilometres (3.1 mi) south-west of Marburg.

== Education ==
Izotsha Primary School, situated in the centre of the settlement, is one of the oldest schools on the South Coast, established in 1883 around the same time the Port Shepstone School (present-day Port Shepstone Primary School and Port Shepstone High School) was also established. In 1991, the primary school made history by becoming the first “only-whites” school on the Lower South Coast to open its doors to children of other race groups.

== Attractions ==
Touted as the largest reptile farm in Africa, Pure Venom Reptile Park is situated just south of Izotsha on the P200 Izotsha Road and includes guided tours and daily demonstrations of the variety of snakes, iguanas and crocodiles on the farm.

== Religion ==
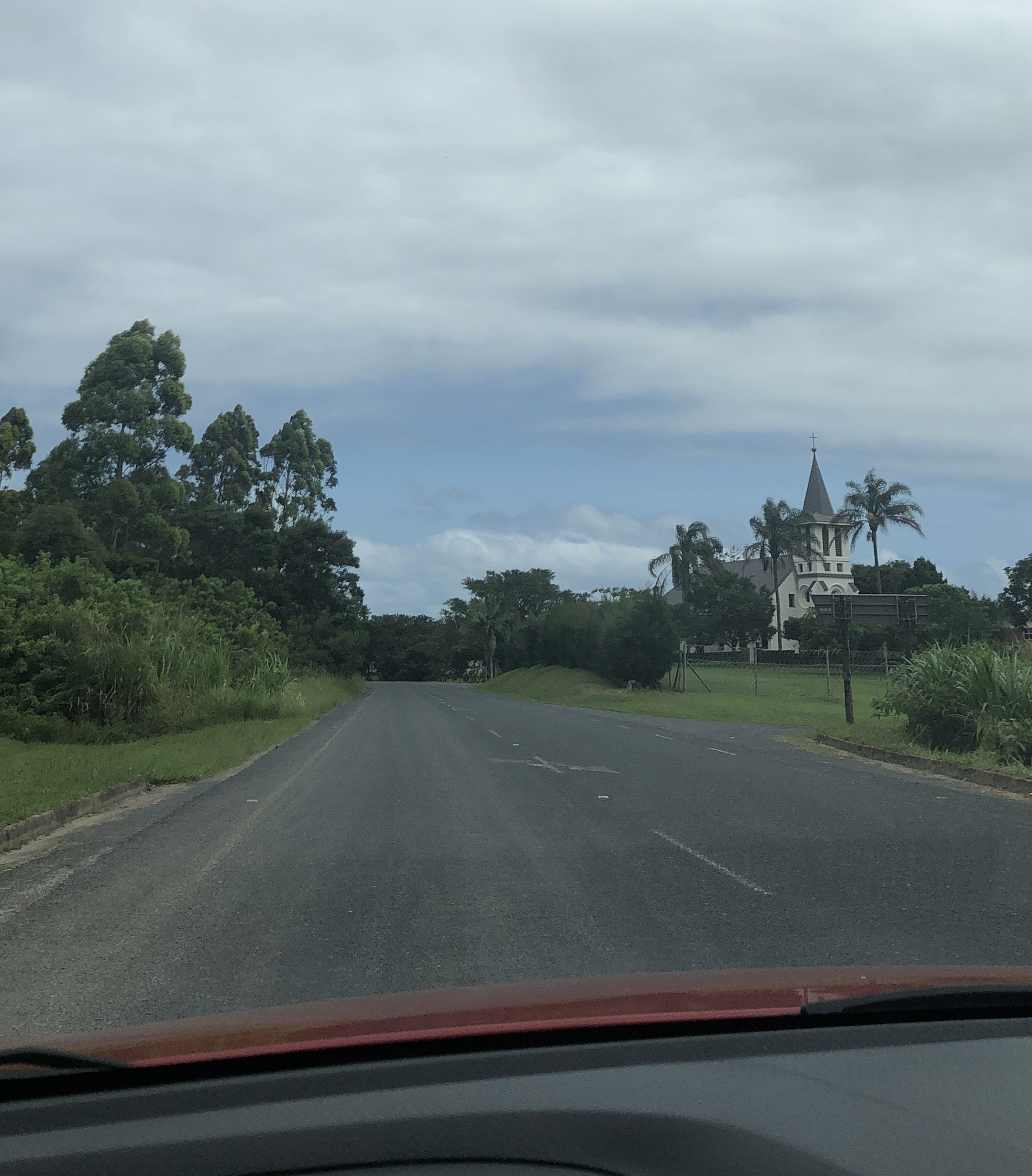
The Bethany Lutheran Church on Izotsha Road

The Bethany Lutheran Church situated on the P55 Izotsha Road was established in 1903 by German missionary, Reverend Peter Stoppel arrived on the South Coast to do missionary work after being sent by the Hermannsburg Mission to start a mission station in the area. Today, the Lutheran church stands as testament to the strong German heritage that still remains on the Lower South Coast.

== Transport ==
=== Rail ===
Izotsha once formed part of the Alfred County Railway which was an 2 ft (610 mm) narrow gauge railway which ran from Port Shepstone in the north-east, through Izotsha, to Paddock and Harding in the north-west. After the standard gauge Transnet passenger services shut down in 1986, the ACR continued operations until 2005, when the famous Banana Express ceased operation.

=== Roads ===
Izotsha lies at the intersection of the P55 and P200. The P55 (Izotsha Road) connects Izotsha with Shelly Beach to the south-east and with Paddock to the north-west and provides access to the R61 highway (to Port Shepstone and Port Edward). The P200 (Izotsha Road) connects Izotsha with Marburg to the north and with Gamalakhe and Ramsgate to the south.

==== Tolling ====
The R61, forming part of the South Coast Toll Route, involves the payment of toll at the toll booths of the Izotsha Ramp Toll Plaza, situated on the off and on-ramps of the Izotsha Road interchange (Exit 39). Traffic arriving from the south to turn off at exit 39 and traffic joining the R61 S from Izotsha Road must pass through the respective ramp plazas. The R620 from Shelly Beach to Margate and Port Shepstone serves as the untolled alternative route to the R61.
