= Beekman Group =

South African leisure hospitality provider and property developer

The Beekman Group
- Industry: Property developers
- Founded: 1970
- Founder: John Beekman & Bram Beekman
- Headquarters: Port Shepstone, KwaZulu-Natal, South Africa
- Key people: John Beekman (CEO), Wayne Beekman (Director), Cindy Allan (Director) and Neville Beekman (Director)
- Number of employees: 1,100 (2021)
- Website: www.beekmangroup.com

The Beekman Group is a leisure hospitality provider and property developer headquartered in Port Shepstone on the South Coast of KwaZulu-Natal, South Africa. The group is known as a leisure services provider of holiday accommodation and resort management services. It also has a portfolio of property development, including leisure, residential and commercial properties. It started operations in 1970.

The Beekman Group has been the recipient of the Standard Bank KZN Top business award and several PMR.africa excellence awards along with other industry awards won since its inception.

== History ==
The Beekman Group (formerly Beekman Brothers Group) was founded by John Beekman and his brother late Bram Beekman in 1970. The group established its first vacation ownership development in 1982 at Banana Beach, which was followed by more Suntide timeshare resorts, including Illovo Sands, Suntide Winkelspruit, Margate Hotel & Cabanas and Qunu Falls. The group then joined The Vacation Ownership Association of South Africa (VOASA). In 1993, Beekman Group launched its first subsidiary, The Holiday Club. The Holiday Club later expanded into Botswana and Zimbabwe.

Since 2002, the group began acquiring commercial and residential properties, and expanding its asset management portfolio.

== Overview ==
The Beekman Group has several operations and investment divisions that cover residential, commercial and leisure sectors. Its leisure operations include holiday homes, vacation ownership and leisure services. These leisure operations have subsidiaries including Vacation Management Services, iExchange, Beekman Managed Portfolio, Beekman Lifestyle Portfolio, Private Residence Collection, Body Bliss Day Spa and Beekman Holidays (Previously Anytime Holidays).

The Beekman Group has received several awards and recognitions including the RCI Developer of the Year award 5 times between 1998 and 2007, with the founders inducted in the RCI Hall of Fame in 2007. The group has also won the Standard Bank KZN Top Business Award twice, and the PMR.africa excellence awards in 2016, 2018 and 2021. The Beekman Managed Portfolio has been awarded the World Travel Awards as Africa’s Leading Travel Club three times.
