= Ugu Youth Radio FM =

Ugu Youth Radio 93.4FM

Port Shepstone, KwaZulu Natal; South Africa
- Frequency: 93.4 MHz

Programming
- Format: Youth radio

Ownership
- Owner: Siyabonga Mkhungo

History
- First air date: December 1, 2012

Links
- Website: www.uyr934fm.co.za

Ugu Youth Radio 93.4FM is a South African national radio station based in Port Shepstone, Kwa-Zulu Natal, that caters to the needs of the Zulu-speaking community. Founded in 2011 and began broadcasting 1 December 2012, it is the largest radio station on the South Coast . The station has a broadcasting licence from ICASA.

Its stated aim is to communicate and inform the youth of the South Coast and beyond as a means of promoting holistic, social, economic, health and spiritual development, thereby improving the quality of life, promoting unity and national building and making possible the development of an open and dramatic society. They also state the need to develop the youth station with understanding of the lives of young people and to understand the community history, its resources and challenges.

== Coverage areas and frequencies ==
It broadcasts on the frequency 93.4 FM in the following areas:

- A 50 km radius centered at Port Shepstone, KwaZulu-Natal (including North-Eastern parts of the Eastern Cape).

== Broadcast languages ==
- Zulu
- English
- Xhosa

== Broadcast time ==
- 24/7

== Target audience ==
- Youth oriented
- LSM 2 - 6

== Programme format ==
- 40% Music
- 60% Talk

== Listenership figures ==
Estimated Listenership
7 Day
85 000
6 000

== Line ups ==
Weekday Shows

- "Fresh Start Breakfast" 06h00 - 09h00
- "My Reflection" 09h00 - 12h00
- "Midday Cruise" 12h00 - 15h00
- "Free Ride Drive" 15h00 - 18h00
- "The talk point" 18h00 - 19h00
- "After Hours" 19h00 - 22h00
- "Heart Beat" 22h00 - 02h00
- "Impressive Start" 02h00 - 06h00
