= Southport, KwaZulu-Natal =

Coastal village in KwaZulu-Natal, South Africa

Southport
- Location within KwaZulu-Natal Location within South Africa
- Coordinates: 30.681°S 30.499°E
- Country: South Africa
- Province: KwaZulu-Natal
- District: Ugu
- Municipality: Ray Nkonyeni
- Main Place: Port Shepstone

Area
  - Total: 1.94 km^{2} (0.75 sq mi)

Population (2011)
  - Total: 598
  - Density: 308/km^{2} (798/sq mi)

Racial makeup (2011)
  - Black African: 20.9%
  - Coloured: 3.6%
  - Indian/Asian: 6.3%
  - White: 68.8%
  - Other: 0.4%

First languages (2011)
  - English: 51.5%
  - Afrikaans: 30.0%
  - Zulu: 12.3%
  - Xhosa: 4.8%
  - Other: 1.4%
- Time zone: UTC+2 (SAST)
- PO box: 4230
- Area code: 039

Southport is a small coastal village on the South Coast of KwaZulu-Natal, South Africa and an extension of the coastal town of Port Shepstone in the Ray Nkonyeni Local Municipality.

Southport is situated on the R102 regional route, approximately 9 kilometres (5.6 mi) northeast of Port Shepstone, between Sea Park to the south and Anerley to the north.
