= Oslo Beach =

Coastal suburb in KwaZulu-Natal, South Africa

- Location within KwaZulu-Natal Location within South Africa
- Coordinates: 30°45′00″S 30°27′00″E
- Country: South Africa
- Province: KwaZulu-Natal
- District: Ugu
- Municipality: Ray Nkonyeni
- Main Place: Port Shepstone

Area
  - Total: 5.69 km^{2} (2.20 sq mi)

Population (2011)
  - Total: 3,085
  - Density: 541.86/km^{2} (1,403.4/sq mi)

Racial makeup (2011)
  - Black African: 31.63%
  - Coloured: 3.66%
  - Indian/Asian: 29.71%
  - White: 34.71%
  - Other: 0.29%

First languages (2011)
  - English: 58.39%
  - Zulu: 17.05%
  - Afrikaans: 12.88%
  - Xhosa: 7.91%
  - Other: 2.04%
- Time zone: UTC+2 (SAST)
- Postal code (street): 4240
- PO box: 4240
- Area code: 039

Oslo Beach is a small coastal suburb located along the South Coast of KwaZulu-Natal, South Africa, forming part of the coastal town of Port Shepstone.

== Geography ==
Oslo Beach lies just 3 kilometres (1.9 mi) south of Port Shepstone CBD and lies nestled between Port Shepstone to the north and Shelly Beach to the south.

== Facilities ==
=== Education ===
Oslo Beach is host to two schools, Creston College and Suid-Natal Primere Skool which is an Afrikaans school. Most schools in the Lower South Coast are situated in Port Shepstone and Margate.

=== Emergency & Fire Services ===
Oslo Beach Fire Station, situated on Alesund Road is the main fire station in the Ray Nkonyeni Local Municipality.

=== Healthcare ===
The nearest hospitals are in the Port Shepstone CBD, namely the Port Shepstone Regional Hospital and Hibiscus Hospital Port Shepstone.

=== Retail ===
Oslo Beach is largely a residential area with no retail facilities present, however the nearest malls to Oslo Beach are in close proximity, either in the Port Shepstone CBD or Shelly Beach.

== Roads ==
Oslo Beach straddles along the R620 (Marine Drive), passing Via Tristano, and connecting to Shelly Beach and Margate in the south and the R102 intersection, locally referred to as “Confusion Junction”, in the north.
