= St. Faith's =

St Faith’s
- Location within KwaZulu-Natal Location within South Africa
- Coordinates: 30.519°S 30.207°E
- Country: South Africa
- Province: KwaZulu-Natal
- District: Ugu
- Municipality: Umzumbe

Government
  - Type: Ward 6
  - Councillor: Sbonakaliso Radebe (ANC)

Area
  - Total: 3.10 km^{2} (1.20 sq mi)

Population (2001)
  - Total: 794
  - Density: 256/km^{2} (663/sq mi)

Racial makeup (2001)
  - Black African: 95.1%
  - Indian/Asian: 4.9%

First languages (2001)
  - Zulu: 94.7%
  - English: 4.5%
  - Other: 0.8%
- Time zone: UTC+2 (SAST)

St Faith's is a village in the Umzumbe Local Municipality in the KwaZulu-Natal province of South Africa.

== Geography ==
St Faith's lies on the rolling hills of the KwaZulu-Natal South Coast, approximately 50 km (31 mi) north-west of Port Shepstone and 158 km (98 mi) south-west of Durban.

There are a number of settlements falling under St Faith's: uMqangqala, Nothinwta, Dweshula, Thaleni, Ngoleleni, Zitendeni, Siqhingini, Junction, Diphini, Maromeni and Ivethe.

== Infrastructure ==
Junction is the connecting centre along the Provincial Road which hosts a variety of small businesses. St Faith's hosts a police station and a community health clinic. Some of the infrastructure located in St Faith's is the St Faith's and Johns Dale Community Hall. You also find the following schools: Maria Trost, Khakhamela, St Faith's, Impola are the primary schools, Indlelenhle Secondary and Mayiyana, Ntabalukhozi are the High Schools in St Faith's. Maria Trost Catholic Church mission built with stones is over 100 years. There is a bridge being constructed that will connect Gumatane and Harding crossing over majestic Umzimkhulu river.

== Transport ==
A taxi rank in Junction serves routes to Durban, Port Shepstone, Highflats and Ixopo. The route is also used by Ugu Transport buses. The P68 (St Faith’s Road) connects St Faith’s with the N2 highway (to Durban) and Umtentweni (north of Port Shepstone) to the south-west and Highflats to the north.
