= Izingolweni =

Town in KwaZulu-Natal, South Africa

Izingolweni eZinqoleni
- Location within KwaZulu-Natal Location within South Africa
- Coordinates: 30.775°S 30.127°E
- Country: South Africa
- Province: KwaZulu-Natal
- District: Ugu
- Municipality: Ray Nkonyeni

Area
  - Total: 6.43 km^{2} (2.48 sq mi)

Population (2011)
  - Total: 5,294
  - Density: 823/km^{2} (2,130/sq mi)

Racial makeup (2011)
  - Black African: 100.0%

First languages (2011)
  - Zulu: 97.7%
  - Other: 2.3%
- Time zone: UTC+2 (SAST)
- PO box: 4260
- Area code: 039

Izingolweni or eZinqoleni is a town in Ugu District Municipality in the KwaZulu-Natal province of South Africa. It was founded in the 1870s as a police and administration post. The name comes from the Zulu language word for "place with very shallow holes." Izingolweni also consists of a school called Izingolweni Primary which is rumored that it was built by the community.

== Administration ==
eZinqoleni is administered by the Ray Nkonyeni Local Municipality which governs the Lower South Coast of KwaZulu-Natal. Ezinqoleni was previously administered by the Ezinqoleni Local Municipality but during the 2016 local elections the municipality amalgamated with the Hibiscus Coast Local Municipality to form the new Ray Nkonyeni Local Municipality.

== Geography ==
eZinqoleni is located on the KwaZulu-Natal South Coast and just west of the Oribi Flats, approximately 37 km (23 mi) west of Port Shepstone, 37 km (23 mi) north-west of Port Edward and 107 km (66 mi) south-east of Kokstad

== Transport ==
=== Roads ===
eZinqoleni is bypassed by the N2, routing traffic heading east from Harding and Kokstad towards Port Shepstone. The town can be accessed by turning off the N2 onto the main road from the east and west. The main road continues south-east towards Port Edward as a small rural road named the P284 (Izingolweni Road) which was recently rehabilitated in 2024.

== Sources ==
- Erasmus, B.P.J. (1995). Op Pad in Suid-Afrika. Jonathan Ball Uitgewers. ISBN 1-86842-026-4.
