= Kidd's Beach =

Beach in South Africa

- Location within Eastern Cape Location within South Africa
- Coordinates: 33.150°S 27.695°E
- Country: South Africa
- Province: Eastern Cape
- Municipality: Buffalo City

Area
  - Total: 2.13 km^{2} (0.82 sq mi)

Population (2011)
  - Total: 499
  - Density: 234/km^{2} (607/sq mi)

Racial makeup (2011)
  - Black African: 22.2%
  - Coloured: 1.2%
  - White: 75.4%
  - Other: 1.2%

First languages (2011)
  - English: 63.7%
  - Xhosa: 19.8%
  - Afrikaans: 14.2%
  - Sotho: 1.4%
  - Other: 0.8%
- Time zone: UTC+2 (SAST)
- Postal code (street): 5264
- PO box: 5264
- Area code: 043

Kidd's Beach is a small coastal resort town in the Eastern Cape, South Africa situated on the Mkhanzi River about 28 kilometres from East London, South Africa. The name "Mkhanzi" is derived from the Xhosa word "umkhanzi", which means "bulrush", or Typha capensis. Kidd's Beach was named after Charles Kidd, who was the mayor of nearby King William's Town in the 1860s.
