= R102 (South Africa) =

Regional Route in South Africa

Regional route R102

Location
- Country: South Africa

Highway system
- Numbered routes of South Africa
← R101	→ R103

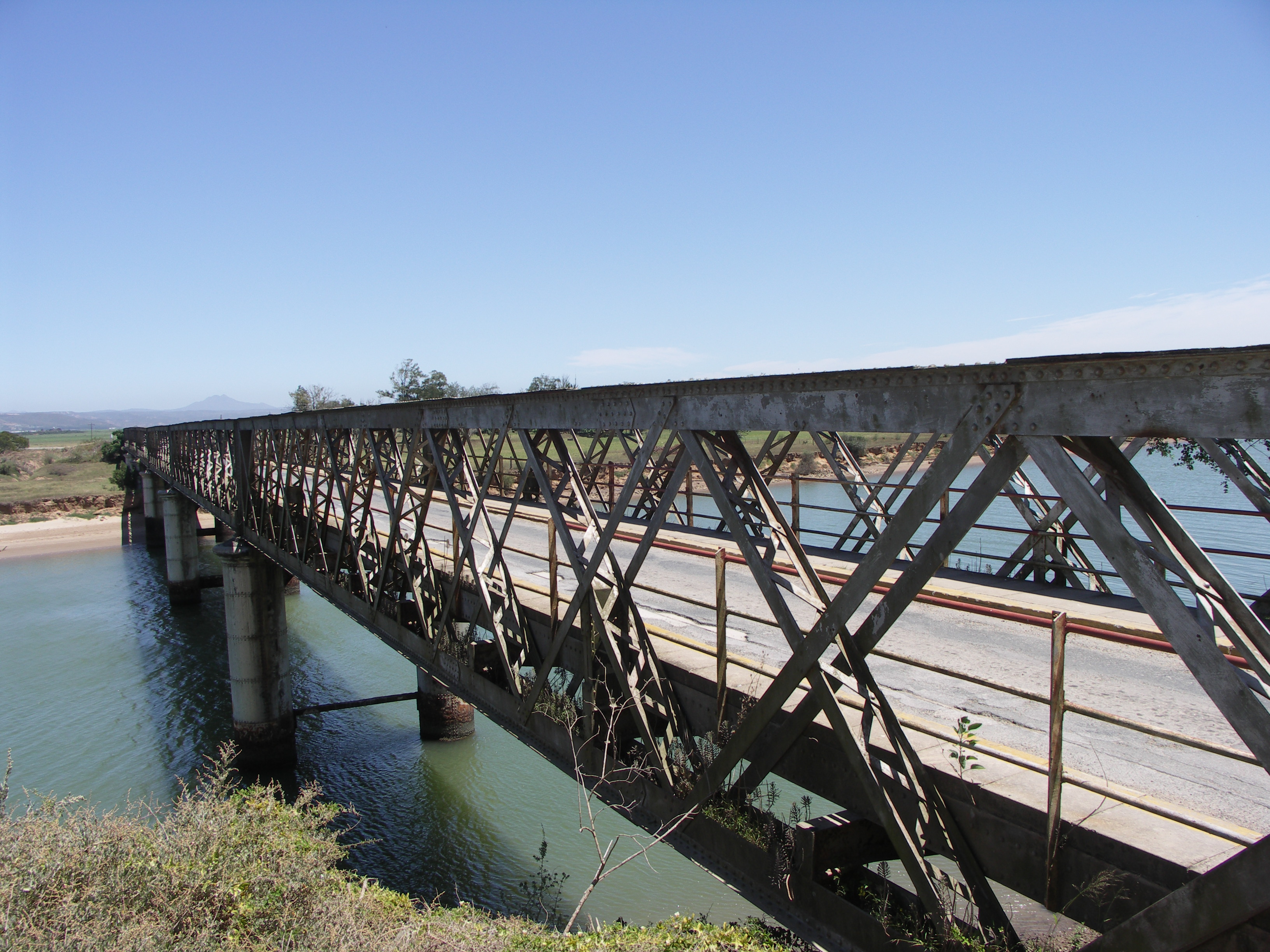
R102 bridge over the Gamtoos River in the Kouga was built in 1895

The R102 is a Regional Route in South Africa. It is the route designation for all old sections of the N2, thus it is a discontinuous road that resumes in areas where a new N2 has been constructed.

== Route ==
R102 Map

=== Western Cape and Eastern Cape ===
In the Cape Town area, the R102 starts in the Central Business District as Strand Street and runs through Woodstock, Maitland, Goodwood and Parow before it reaches Bellville. From Bellville, it turns in a southeasterly direction and goes on the outskirts of the metropolitan area through Kuilsrivier, Eerste River and onwards to Somerset West where it merges with the existing N2.

At Mossel Bay it divides to the east again, passing through all the towns between there and George (including Hartenbos, Little Brak River and Great Brak River). Near Nature's Valley east of Plettenberg Bay it once again splits off, traversing the various Tsitsikamma gorges such as the Grootrivier Pass and the Bloukrans Pass (which is currently closed; was closed in November 2007 due to flood damage) and then rejoining the N2 east of the Bloukrans Bridge. Farther east, in the Eastern Cape, it passes through the towns of Humansdorp and Jeffreys Bay, becoming the Van Stadens Pass and crossing the Gamtoos River and the Van Stadens River on its way to Gqeberha (previously Port Elizabeth), where it passes through the city centre before turning north and merging with the N2 at Coega.

At King William’s Town (7 km south-east of the town centre; at Zwelitsha), the R102 splits again for a short section, starting at a junction with the R346. It heads east-north-east through Phakamisa and Ndevana to Ilitha, where it turns eastwards just before a junction with the N2. It parallels the N2 east-south-east, through Berlin, passing a Walter Sisulu University campus, to form the northern border of the Mdantsane Township just outside East London. It then enters East London, passing through the suburbs to the north of the CBD (meeting the N6) before rejoining the N2 north-east of the city (near Gonubie).

=== KwaZulu-Natal ===
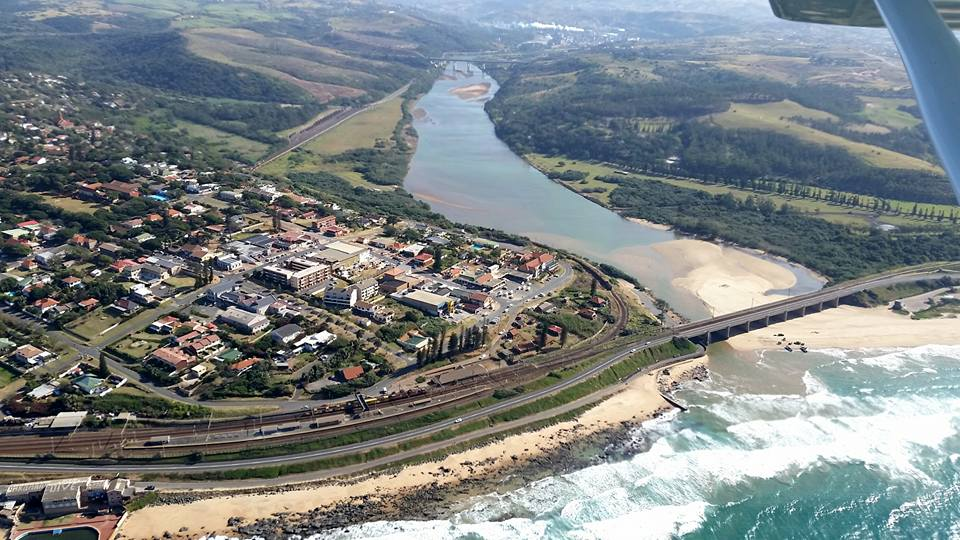
The R102 crossing the Umkomazi River at Umkomaas on the KwaZulu-Natal South Coast, flanked by the South Coast railway line

The R102 separates from the N2 in Port Shepstone on the South Coast of KwaZulu-Natal, winding through a series of small coastal villages such as Umtentweni (now eMthenteni), Sea Park, Southport, Sunwich Port, Anerley, Melville, Pumula, and Umzumbe, eventually reaching the town of Hibberdene. From there, it reconnects briefly with the N2, heading inland through the Mnamfu area. The route then swings back towards the coast, passing through Pennington, Park Rynie, and Scottburgh before crossing the Mahlongwa River and entering the eThekwini Metropolitan Municipality.

Continuing, it passes through Clansthal, Umkomaas (now eMkhomazi), Ilfracombe, and Umgababa, crossing the Msimbazi River into Kingsburgh at Illovo Beach. In Kingsburgh, it traverses Winklespruit, Warner Beach, and Doonside, then continues through Amanzimtoti (now eManzimtoti) and its northern suburb, Athlone Park. After crossing the eZimbokodweni River, it enters the industrial area of Prospecton, slightly diverging from the coastline. The R102 crosses the N2 again, bypasses Isipingo and Reunion, and intersects with the M30 and the M4 freeway at the Reunion Interchange just east of Umlazi.

The R102 continues over the Umlaas River and under the N2 again, entering Durban through the industrial areas of Mobeni and Rossburgh. It then passes through Umbilo, which has both residential and industrial sections, before reaching Congella (now KwaKhangela). From there, it enters Durban's Central Business District from the south, passing north and east through it as the main road (cosigned with the M4) before turning north at Umgeni Road.

North of Durban, the route continues through Durban North, bypasses KwaMashu and runs between Phoenix and Mount Edgecombe before reaching Verulam. It continues to bypass the King Shaka International Airport to the west and passes through Tongaat (now oThongathi) before heading towards Stanger (now KwaDukuza). Between Tongaat and Stanger, the route passes through the small settlements of Umhlali and Shakaskraal. After Stanger, the route heads through Darnall, Mandini and Gingindlovu (now KwaGingindlovu), passes close to Mtunzini, before heading to Empangeni. About 5 kilometres (3.1 mi) north of Empangeni, the route merges with the N2.

== New section ==
There are plans to realign the N2 national route from the city of Mthatha to the town of Port Shepstone, on a new route known as the Wild Coast Toll Route or Wild Coast Highway. It was initially scheduled for completion in 2024 and the N2 will take over the entire section of the current R61 route between the two cities (with realignment between Lusikisiki and the C. H. Mitchell Bridge), and turning that route into two lanes in each direction, providing a shorter and faster route through the Wild Coast.

So, as the N2 will be realigned, the old N2 route from Mthatha to Port Shepstone, passing through KwaBhaca, Kokstad and Harding, just like most other old sections of the N2, will be designated as the R102 when the project is finished.
