= Madlala =

Madlala is a surname. Notable people with the surname include:

- Emerald Madlala (fl. from 2024), South African politician
- Linda Hlongwa-Madlala (fl. from 2005), South African politician
- Ndumiso Madlala (1975/1976–2025), South African brewer and businessman
- Nozizwe Madlala-Routledge (born 1952), South African politician

== See also ==
- Madlax
