= Mthwalume =

Mthwalume Mtwalume
- Location within KwaZulu-Natal Location within South Africa
- Coordinates: 30.483°S 30.633°E
- Country: South Africa
- Province: KwaZulu-Natal
- District: Ugu
- Municipality: Umzumbe

Area
  - Total: 2.89 km^{2} (1.12 sq mi)

Population (2011)
  - Total: 610
  - Density: 210/km^{2} (550/sq mi)

Racial makeup (2011)
  - Black African: 18.0%
  - Coloured: 2.3%
  - Indian/Asian: 4.9%
  - White: 74.6%
  - Other: 0.2%

First languages (2011)
  - Afrikaans: 42.4%
  - English: 41.4%
  - Zulu: 12.6%
  - Xhosa: 2.0%
  - Other: 1.6%
- Time zone: UTC+2 (SAST)
- PO box: 4186
- Area code: 039

Mtwalume, correctly known as uMthwalume, is a settlement in Ugu District Municipality in the KwaZulu-Natal province of South Africa.

A small seaside village about 87 km south of Durban, it is predominantly a holiday and fishing village. The name "Mthwalume" is derived from isiZulu, and refers to the tall upright trees growing on the river bank. The Mtwalume River winds for 85 km and ends in a waterfall near Highflats.

Mthwalume is largely made up of rural, but modern villages. The majority of the Mthwalume land area falls under the traditional chieftaincy of iNkosi Bhekizizwe Luthuli whose residency is near Turton. Some of the well-known Mtwalume villages lie along the Indian Ocean coast. These villages are Mnafu, Turton, Makhoso and Gobhela. Inland villages include eNyangwini, Nomakhanzane, Dingimbiza, eMabheleni, KwaQoloqolo, Othandweni, Nomoyi and Bangibizo. Mthwalume is bordered on the north by Efafa - another coastal town - and on the south by Hibberdene.

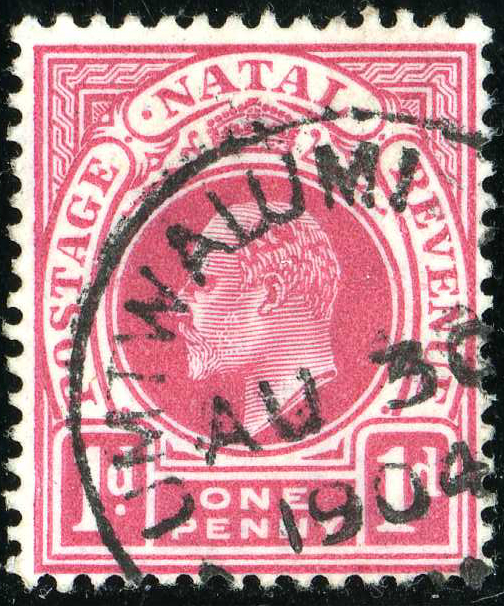
UMTWALUMI postmark in 1904

== Population and culture ==
The majority of Mtwalume falls under the municipal jurisdiction of Umzumbe Local Municipality, while a small portion that is sea-facing falls under Umdoni Local Municipality. The majority of Mtwalume residents are Zulu people who speak the Zulu dialect. There is a limited White population along the suburban coastal parts of Mtwalume. The most dominant culture is traditional Zulu and Christian, as most of the residents uphold Christian faith and values. Some of the well-established Christian denominations in Mtwalume are Apostolic Church Southern Africa, Assemblies of God, Faith Mission, Roman Catholic Church, and United Congregational Church.

== Education ==
There are a number of primary and secondary schools in Mtwalume, and they largely teach in isiZulu and English. Some of the primary schools are Esbanini Primary School (in eNyangwini), KwaNomakhanzane Primary School, Bangibizo Primary School, Mandlendoda Primary School (in Turton), Gobhela Primary School, KwaBhavu Primary School (in Othandweni) and Wilder Primary School (in KwaQoloqolo). Secondary (i.e. high) schools include Luthuli High School (in Turton), Mthwalume High School (in KwaQoloqolo), KwaFica Secondary School (in Bangibizo), Zibonele Secondary School (in KwaNomakhanzane) and Bonguzwane Secondary School (in eNyangwini).

== Transport, housing and other infrastructure ==
Most of the inland roads are gravel although tar roads dominate the coastal areas. People largely use taxis and buses. The main taxi rank is found in Turton at the intersection of Sipofu Road and R102. There is also a significant percentage of people who own cars. Most of these people are teachers, health professionals, police and other workers. The working population (outside of teachers, police and health workers) work in the nearby towns of Port Shepstone, Margate, Shelly Beach, Hibberdene, Umzinto and Scottburgh. Some people work as far as Durban.

The Turton Community Clinic now Mfundo Arnold Lushaba Community Health Centre is the only known health clinic in Mtwalume. It is located together with the offices of Umzumbe Local Municipality offices. For hospitals, residents of Mtwalume normally use the Port Shepstone Regional Hospital and the Scottburgh's GJ Crookes Hospital. Msinsini Police Station is the only South African Police Service security facility in the area now with a satellite office next to the Clinic serviced under Hibberdene Police Station.
