= Ndevana =

- Location within Eastern Cape Location within South Africa
- Coordinates: 32.9074°S 27.5102°E
- Country: South Africa
- Province: Eastern Cape
- Municipality: Buffalo City

Area
  - Total: 6.10 km^{2} (2.36 sq mi)

Population (2011)
  - Total: 12,680
  - Density: 2,080/km^{2} (5,380/sq mi)

Racial makeup (2011)
  - Black African: 99.8%
  - Other: 0.2%

First languages (2011)
  - Xhosa: 95.7%
  - English: 1.8%
  - Sign Language: 0.9%
  - Other: 1.6%
- Time zone: UTC+2 (SAST)

Ndevana is a settlement situated east of Qonce. It falls under Buffalo City Metropolitan Municipality in the Eastern Cape province of South Africa.
