= Brevo =

French marketing company

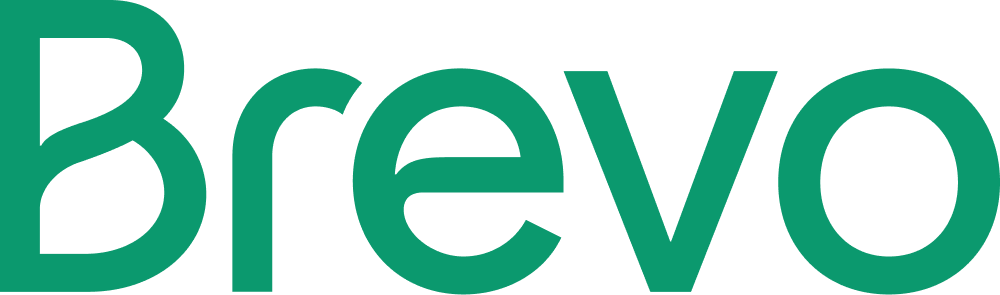
- Company type: Private
- Available in: 6 languages
- Founded: 2012; 14 years ago
- Headquarters: Paris, France
- Founder: Armand Thiberge
- CEO: Armand Thiberge
- Industry: Relationship marketing
- Services: Email marketing, marketing automation
- Employees: 1,000 (2025)
- Website: brevo.com
- Users: 600K+

Brevo is a cloud-based software company that provides tools for marketing and relationship marketing. The company was founded in 2012 by Armand Thiberge and offers a cloud-based marketing communication software suite with email marketing, transactional email, marketing automation, customer-relationship management, landing pages, Facebook ads, retargeting ads, SMS marketing, and SMS messaging and customer relationship management (CRM), and Customer Data Platform (CDP).

The company has eight offices globally, which are located in Paris, Delhi, Seattle, Berlin, Sofia, Toronto, New York and Vienna. The headquarters are located in the Paris office, which is also home to the customer service, marketing, product, and technical teams. There are currently 600,000+ customers using Brevo products worldwide. Features offered by Brevo software include A/B testing, report production, contact list management, and email heatmap.

== History ==
Brevo was founded in 2012 in Paris, France, under the name Sendinblue, by Armand Thiberge. The company initially focused on providing email marketing and transactional email services for small and medium-sized businesses. The same year, the company opened its first offices in Paris, France and Noida, India. Globally, the company has four offices: Paris, Delhi, Seattle, and Berlin. Sendinblue has over 500,000 active users in 160 countries. It is currently used by 180,000 businesses worldwide.

Sendinblue was chosen as one of 20 startups to watch in 2016 by Forbes magazine.

In January 2019, Sendinblue acquired all shares of Newsletter2Go GmbH, a Berlin-based marketing software company, whose product was later rebranded as Sendinblue and then as Brevo. In October 2020, Brevo raised $160 million in Series B funding, one of the largest rounds for a French tech company at the time. The funding round was led by Bridgepoint, Bpifrance, and BlackRock, with the goal of expanding into new markets and developing additional tools such as CRM and automation features.

In 2023, Sendinblue changed its name to Brevo. Later that year, Brevo acquired mobile app push provider WonderPush and customer data platform (CDP) provider Octolis.

== Products ==
Brevo offers a cloud-based platform that combines marketing, sales, and customer relationship tools, primarily targeting small and medium-sized businesses as well as mid-market companies. Its core features include email marketing, SMS campaigns, marketing automation, transactional messaging, live chat, WhatsApp marketing, and a CRM that allows users to store contact data, create and manage deals and tasks, segment audiences, and automate follow-ups.

The platform also includes tools for push notifications (web and mobile) and cloud-based phone communication, introduced through the acquisition of Yodel.io in 2022. Brevo launched an AI-powered writing assistant in 2023 to help generate subject lines and content tailored to different tones and goals.

Brevo also offers a Customer Data Platform (CDP) for unified data management and advanced segmentation, as well as a Commerce Suite designed for retail and e-commerce businesses. In 2024, it launched a built-in Loyalty Program tool that enables brands to create and manage customer rewards systems.

The platform integrates with a wide range of third-party applications, including WordPress, Shopify, Salesforce, and WooCommerce, WhatsApp, Instagram, Facebook Messenger, Google Meet, Zoom and more via plug-ins and APIs.

== Recognition ==
Brevo has received several industry recognitions for its growth and innovation in digital marketing services. In 2021 and in 2025, it was listed among the "Next40," a French government-backed index highlighting the 40 most promising French tech companies with global potential.

In 2023, Brevo surpassed $100 million in annual recurring revenue while remaining profitable.

In May 2025, Brevo achieved B Corp certification, with a B Impact Score of 130.5

In 2025, Brevo became a unicorn, with a valuation exceeding $1 billion, following a €500 million equity funding round ($583 million). Brevo plans to use these funds to accelerate its growth, invest in artificial intelligence, and expand its presence, particularly in the United States.
