= Hibberdene =

Coastal town in KwaZulu-Natal, South Africa

- Location within KwaZulu-Natal Location within South Africa
- Coordinates: 30°34′20″S 30°34′20″E
- Country: South Africa
- Province: KwaZulu-Natal
- District: Ugu
- Municipality: Ray Nkonyeni

Area
  - Total: 14.26 km^{2} (5.51 sq mi)

Population (2011)
  - Total: 4,037
  - Density: 283.1/km^{2} (733.2/sq mi)

Racial makeup (2011)
  - Black African: 67.1%
  - White: 29.4%
  - Indian/Asian: 1.8%
  - Coloured: 1.2%
  - Other: 0.4%

First languages (2011)
  - Zulu: 60.9%
  - English: 18.1%
  - Afrikaans: 15.8%
  - Xhosa: 3.2%
  - Other: 2.0%
- Time zone: UTC+2 (SAST)
- Postal code (street): 4220
- PO box: 4220
- Area code: 039

Hibberdene is a small coastal town on the KwaZulu-Natal South Coast in South Africa, approximately 23 km (14 mi) north-east of Port Shepstone and 90 km (56 mi) south-west of Durban and halfway between coastal towns of Scottburgh and Margate.

Hibberdene is situated on a coastal hillside between the uMhlungwa River to the north and the uMzimayi River to the south, both of which drain into the Indian Ocean. The town was named after C. Maxwell-Hibberd, the former postmaster-general of Natal.

== Law and government ==
=== Municipal administration ===
Previously an independent municipality and part of the defunct Hibiscus Coast Local Municipality, Hibberdene now forms part of the Ray Nkonyeni Local Municipality and the larger Ugu District Municipality.

=== Municipal re-demarcation ===
As the 2024 national government elections near, there have recently been several demarcation proposals made by the Municipal Demarcation Board (MDB) to relocate Ward 13 of the Ray Nkonyeni Local Municipality which includes Hibberdene and its neighbouring settlements of Woodgrange-on-Sea, Umzumbe (Umzumbe Village), Fairview/Fairview Mission and eNtaba to the adjoining Umzumbe Local Municipality.

However, Umzumbe Village and Fairview would still remain part of Ray Nkonyeni. It has also been highlighted that the relocation of most of Ward 13 to Umzumbe Municipality is in a bid to stimulate economic activity in the Greater Umzumbe area, a rural municipality plagued with administrative mismanagement, high levels of unemployment and little economic and social development. The reason for the relocation is also attributed to the fact that Hibberdene serves as the nearest urban service centre to the Greater Umzumbe area. A final decision on the demarcation proposals is yet to made regarding the relocation of Hibberdene to the Umzumbe Municipality.

== Demographics ==
The 2011 census divided the main area of Hibberdene into seven “sub places”: Hibberdene (pop. 790), the coastal areas of Catalina (pop. 455) to the north, Woodgrange-on-Sea (pop. 292) to the immediate south, Umzumbe (pop. 366) to the far south and the inland rural areas of Fairview (pop. 1,606) and Fairview Mission (pop. 527) to the west.

== Retail ==
Hibberdene serves as a retail centre for the small settlements and countryside surrounding it such as Mthwalume and Mathulini. The town centre of Hibberdene, located along the R102, includes the Hibberdene Village Mall, a PicknPay supermarket, and several other retailers, hardware stores, and local businesses.

== Culture and comptemptory life ==
=== Tourism ===
Similarly to most towns along the South Coast, Hibberdene mostly depends on tourism for its small-scale economy. Situated at the gateway to the Hibiscus Coast, Hibberdene is popularly known as an affordable holiday destination and for its beaches.

Hibberdene has five popular beaches, four of which are netted and thus are safe for swimming. Hibberdene's beaches are popular because of the warm Indian Ocean flowing across its shoreline, making diving, snorkelling and scuba diving very pleasant. Two of its beaches, Hibberdene Beach and Umzumbe Beach are accredited with the international Blue Flag beach status.

== Transport ==
Hibberdene lies just off the N2 freeway, running north–south from Durban to Port Shepstone with an interchange at the R102. The R102 forms the town’s main thoroughfare connecting to Pennington in the north as well as to Umzumbe and Port Shepstone in the south, in which the R102 S is often used an alternative route to the tolled N2.

A twice daily shuttle bus stops in Hibberdene connecting the town with Margate, Port Shepstone, Durban and King Shaka International Airport.
