= Melville, KwaZulu-Natal =

Coastal village in KwaZulu-Natal, South Africa

Melville
- Location within KwaZulu-Natal Location within South Africa Location within Africa
- Coordinates: 30°39′25″S 30°30′54″E
- Country: South Africa
- Province: KwaZulu-Natal
- District: Ugu
- Municipality: Ray Nkonyeni

Area
  - Total: 1.49 km^{2} (0.58 sq mi)

Population (2011)
  - Total: 1,029
  - Density: 691/km^{2} (1,790/sq mi)

Racial makeup (2011)
  - Black African: 75.4%
  - Coloured: 2.7%
  - White: 21.7%
  - Other: 0.2%

First languages (2011)
  - Zulu: 60.0%
  - English: 15.5%
  - Xhosa: 8.3%
  - Other: 2.4%
- Time zone: UTC+2 (SAST)
- PO box: 4240
- Area code: 039

Melville is a coastal resort village situated along the South Coast of KwaZulu-Natal, South Africa.

== Culture and comptemptory life ==
Melville is a quiet and small coastal village often regarded as something of an extension of Port Shepstone. The village has no shopping centre (nearest shopping facilities are found in Port Shepstone and Hibberdene) or public transport to speak of with very little to no developments in the area. As a result, it remains largely unspoilt, abundantly covered by indigenous subtropical vegetation, most notably wild banana trees (hence it has a beach called Banana Beach).

== Geography ==
Melville is situated on the coastal R102 route halfway between Port Shepstone (11 kilometres) – the economic hub of the South Coast and Hibberdene (12 kilometres). It is bordered by the coastal villages of Pumula to the north and Sunwich Port to the south.

== Tourism ==
Melville hosts two beaches within its boundaries, namely Melville Beach and Banana Beach. However, larger beaches in the greater vicinity of the Hibiscus Coast area can also be found in Hibberdene, Port Shepstone, St Michael's-on-Sea, Uvongo, Margate and Ramsgate.

As a coastal resort area, Melville also contains a few recreational areas such as the Banana Beach Holiday Resort, Illanga Resort & Caravan Park and the Lalanathi Caravan & Camping Park.
