= Port Shepstone =

Coastal town in KwaZulu-Natal, South Africa

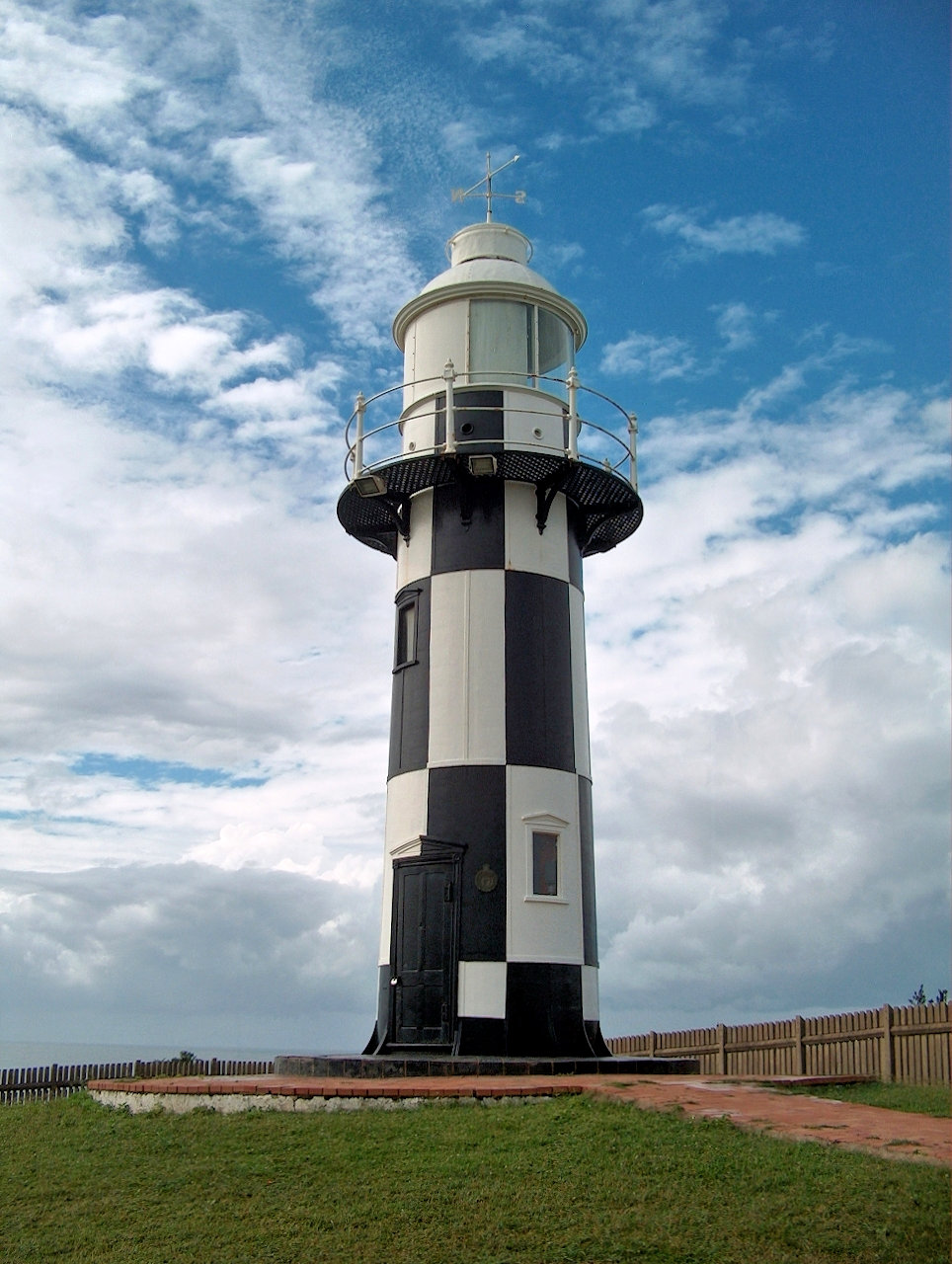
- Port Shepstone Lighthouse

- Location within KwaZulu-Natal Location within South Africa Location within Africa
- Coordinates: 30°45′00″S 30°27′00″E
- Country: South Africa
- Province: KwaZulu-Natal
- District: Ugu
- Municipality: Ray Nkonyeni

Area
  - Total: 38.02 km^{2} (14.68 sq mi)

Population (2011)
  - Total: 35,633
  - Density: 937.2/km^{2} (2,427/sq mi)

Racial makeup (2011)
  - Black African: 39.7%
  - Indian/Asian: 32.1%
  - White: 21.3%
  - Coloured: 6.3%
  - Other: 0.5%

First languages (2011)
  - English: 55.3%
  - Zulu: 21.4%
  - Xhosa: 10.5%
  - Afrikaans: 9.3%
  - Other: 3.5%
- Time zone: UTC+2 (SAST)
- Postal code (street): 4240
- PO box: 4240
- Area code: 039

Port Shepstone is a large town situated on the mouth of the Mzimkhulu River, the largest river on the KwaZulu-Natal South Coast of South Africa. It is located halfway between Hibberdene and Margate and is positioned 120 km south of Durban. It serves as the administrative, educational, industrial and commercial centre for southern Natal.

== History ==
Port Shepstone was founded in 1867 when marble was discovered near the Mzimkhulu River mouth and is named after Sir Theophilus Shepstone of the Natal government of the 1880s.

William Bazley began building a harbour, and the work was later taken over by William Barnes Kinsey, who was the engineer in charge of building Port Shepstone harbour in 1898. The first coaster entered the harbour on May 8, 1880. In 1882 a party of 246 Norwegian immigrants settled in the town and subsequently started to play a major role in the development of the area. Post the opening of the railway to Durban in 1901, the harbour fell into disuse and eventually the river silted up again, making it impossible to use. The 27,000-candela lighthouse still stands at the mouth of the Mzimkulu River.

=== Norwegian settlers ===
Norwegian immigration to Port Shepstone began in the late 19th century, when 246 Norwegians (along with 175 British and 112 German settlers) came ashore with a steamship which arrived in 1882. The soon-to-be settlers founded a nearby interior village within the same year, known as Marburg. The Norwegian settlers played a large role in the development of not only Marburg, but also Port Shepstone and nearby areas. Norwegian immigration to the region was a result of the Natal Immigration Board’s efforts to claim land for Europeans in South Africa. When the Norwegians first arrived, they were the largest European group in Alfred County. Remains of the Norwegian presence can still be seen today in certain places of the town, such as, Fredheim and Oslo Beach, with its main street King Haakon Drive.

The Norwegians erected a Norwegian Lutheran church, school, cultural hall, choir, and rowing club. A newspaper in Norwegian language was also distributed in Port Shepstone. Drinks such as akvavit and cuisine, including cheese from soured milk, were easily accessible. When the Norwegians arrived, few European settlers lived in the area and the town of Port Shepstone consisted of one hotel, two cabins, one shop, and little else.

=== After Norwegian settlement ===
Port Shepstone was declared “a full fiscal port’ in 1893, and after Durban officially became the region's second harbour. Eventually, though, the ongoing wreckages and arrival of the railway, was to see the gradual closure of the harbour and the start of the real Port Shepstone boom.

When the railway arrived in Port Shepstone in 1901, the travel time to Durban was reduced to five hours, and the town became far less isolated. The railway connection opened for increased immigration for other settlers, and the Norwegians were soon outnumbered by German and British settlers. Between 1911 and 1912, the number of students at the Norwegian school became too low for the school to keep open, and consequently, it closed.

=== Apartheid era ===
In 1950, the Group Areas Act. racially divided Port Shepstone similar to many other towns and cities in South Africa. Port Shepstone proper (Sheppie) was classified "white" and was managed by its town board. The "white" suburbs of the town included the little coastal villages of Umtentweni, Sea Park, Southport, Anerley and Sunwich Port to the north and Oslo Beach to the south. To the west, Marburg was classified as an "Indian area" which was one of the four Indian proclaimed townships in the KwaZulu-Natal province and Merlewood was classified as a "Coloured area" with 3000 Coloureds as its first people settling there. In the late 1960s, Albersville, just west of the Central Business District (CBD) was classified as an "Indian area".

The N2 highway that cuts through Port Shepstone acted as a border between the "non-white" areas to the west and the "white" areas to the east (excluding Albersville) which was planned by apartheid planners.

At the time, there was no township present in Port Shepstone due to the management of the "black" area which was creating a problem because the Nsimbini Tribal Authority claimed the extension of their territory on white land which was their in the past. The Grand Apartheid policies initiated in the 60's is going to include the two “villages” of Boboyi and Murchison in the KwaZulu bantustan.

== Notable people ==
- Roland Victor Norris (1888–1950), biochemist, died in Shepstone
- Theophilus Shepstone (1817–1893), statesman

== Law and government ==
Port Shepstone is located within the Ray Nkonyeni Local Municipality, forming part of the Ugu District Municipality and functions as the municipal seat for both municipalities. The town hosts a Magistrate's Court and most central and provincial government departments maintain regional branches or other offices here.

== Geography ==
=== Suburban areas ===
The 2011 census divided the main place of Port Shepstone into 14 sub places including:

- Albersville
- Anerley
- Grosvenor
- Marburg
- Marburg Ext. 22
- Merlewood
- Oslo Beach
- Port Shepstone SP
- Protea Park
- Sea Park
- Southport
- Sunwich Port
- Umbango
- Umtentweni

=== Climate ===
Climate data for Port Shepstone
Month	Jan	Feb	Mar	Apr	May	Jun	Jul	Aug	Sep	Oct	Nov	Dec	Year
Mean daily maximum °C (°F)	26 (79)	26 (79)	25 (77)	24 (75)	23 (73)	21 (70)	21 (70)	21 (70)	21 (70)	22 (72)	23 (73)	25 (77)	23 (73)
Daily mean °C (°F)	23 (73)	23 (73)	23 (73)	21 (70)	19 (66)	17 (63)	16 (61)	17 (63)	18 (64)	19 (66)	20 (68)	22 (72)	19 (66)
Mean daily minimum °C (°F)	20 (68)	20 (68)	20 (68)	17 (63)	15 (59)	12 (54)	12 (54)	13 (55)	15 (59)	16 (61)	18 (64)	19 (66)	16 (61)
Average precipitation mm (inches)	121 (4.8)	126 (5.0)	148 (5.8)	82 (3.2)	60 (2.4)	31 (1.2)	38 (1.5)	49 (1.9)	87 (3.4)	114 (4.5)	123 (4.8)	127 (5.0)	1,106 (43.5)
Source: Weatherbase

== Economy ==
=== Economic role ===
Port Shepstone serves as the main economic node on the South Coast with a diverse economy, ranging from manufacturing, commerce, service, hospitality, mining and service providing companies. As the only small industrial town on the Lower South Coast, Port Shepstone is surrounded by a stretch of coastal resorts (eg. Margate, Shelly Beach, Hibberdene), making it challenging for the town to assert its industrial and labour-intensive identity amidst the predominantly tourism-driven region. Nevertheless, the town is still able display itself as an administrative, industrial and economic centre.

Port Shepstone’s regional significance and strategically central location on the Lower South Coast have positioned the town as a major service and employment hub for surrounding rural communities and smaller towns.

=== Manufacturing and industries ===
Port Shepstone’s substantial industrial sector is concentrated in Marburg, west of the CBD, serving as the only major industrial zone on the South Coast. The town's industries also include Illovo Sugar's Umzimkhulu Sugar Mill, a lime works and a marble quarry. Additionally, timber, wattle bark and sub-tropical fruit are produced in the broader district.

=== Retail ===
The Port Shepstone CBD contains the town’s largest concentration of retail activity, characterised by typical high street retail and a number of shopping centres, including:

- Ithala Shopping Centre: A convenience shopping centre situated on Bazley Street and anchored by Superspar
- Oribi Plaza Shopping Centre: A community shopping centre situated along the R102 and at south-western end of Aiken Street. The centre is anchored by Pick n Pay and Clicks.
- Port Shepstone Mall: The largest shopping centre in Port Shepstone, situated at the western entrance to the CBD at the corner of Nelson Mandela Drive and Ryder Street. The centre is anchored by Shoprite, Boxer, Clicks and Dis-Chem.
- Sheppie Mall: A small convenience centre situated on the “dip” of Aiken Street and anchored by Spar.

For a broader retail selection, most Port Shepstone residents travel to nearby Shelly Beach, which hosts the two largest shopping centres on the South Coast, namely Shelly Centre and Southcoast Mall.

==== Retail developments ====
As part of the local urban renewal programme, the former Port Shepstone taxi terminus on Nelson Mandela Drive in the CBD was demolished to make way for a new integrated intermodal facility. The construction of the R550-million Port Shepstone Mall (also known as the Port Shepstone Intermodal Facility) which began in November 2022 opened its doors on 24 October 2024 and officially launched on 15 November 2024. The facility is a four-level structure with gross retail area of 23 890m² comprising informal traders stalls and anchor stores such as Boxer, Shoprite and China Hyper.

A new Checkers FreshX store officially opened on Bisset Street in the CBD in May 2025. This investment is expected to create over 100 jobs and, according to South Coast Tourism and Investment Enterprise (SCTIE), will strengthen the position of Port Shepstone as a key retail and economic hub on the South Coast.

=== Major companies ===
Port Shepstone is home to the headquarters of notable companies such as the Beekman Group, a major South African leisure hospitality provider and property developer as well as the Bargain Group, a local retailer operating in KwaZulu-Natal and the Eastern Cape.

== Culture and contemporary life ==
=== Tourism ===
Although Port Shepstone serves as a regional economic centre at its core, it is also home to two main tourist attractions:

- The Mzimkhulu River Marina has leisure boat trips on the river in which people can admire the rich wildlife and bird life along the banks of the river.
- The Port Shepstone Museum which includes the town's history with a series of exhibits carrying a maritime theme and the Port Shepstone Lighthouse, which has a 27 000 candela lighthouse that still stands at the mouth of the Mzimkhulu River. The present day cast iron lighthouse was erected during 1906 and can still be explored today.

Port Shepstone Beach is the primary beach in Port Shepstone, located just east of the CBD. To the south lies Oslo Beach, while to the north are Umtentweni Beach, Sea Park Beach, Southport Beach, Sunwich Port Beach, Banana Beach, and Melville Beach.

Port Shepstone also serves as the gateway to the numerous attractions along the South Coast namely the Oribi Gorge, Aliwal Shoal, Umtamvuna Nature Reserve, Pure Venom Reptile Farm and the Riverbend Crocodile Farm among others.

== Sports ==
Port Shepstone Country Club is a large 18-hole golf course located on the northern banks of the uMzimkhulu River in Umtentweni. Opened in 1912, the country club has been voted consecutively for 8 years as the Best Golf Course on the South Coast in the South Coast Herald's Readers’ Choice Awards.

== Education ==
The first school was opened in 1883, but by 1950, the school became too small. The Port Shepstone School split into two, the Port Shepstone Primary School and the Port Shepstone High School. There is also the Port Shepstone Secondary School. There are other schools in the surrounding areas such as Mlonde High School, Marburg Secondary School, Marburg Primary School, R.A Engar Primary School, Jai Hind Primary School, Margate Middle School, Margate Primary, Ingwemabala Comprehensive High School, Makhanda Secondary School and Insingizi Combined Primary School.

== Media ==
Local newspapers in Port Shepstone include the South Coast Herald and South Coast Fever which serve the entirety of the KwaZulu-Natal South Coast.

The Ugu Youth Radio is a youth radio which is based in Port Shepstone and caters to the needs of the Zulu-speaking community. Other radios which serve Port Shepstone and surroundings include East Coast Radio, Gagasi FM, Vuma FM and Ukhozi FM, all of which are based either in Durban or to the north of KwaZulu-Natal.

== Transport ==
=== Air ===
The nearest airport is Margate Airport, which is located in the namesake town and is about 20 km south-west of Port Shepstone. The airport is small-scale, and only offers one scheduled domestic route to Johannesburg. King Shaka International Airport, near Durban, is about 158 km north-east of Port Shepstone and has many domestic and international air routes.

==== Buses ====
Nowadays regular daily bus services connect Port Shepstone to other major cities in South Africa. These buses normally terminate in different locations in the CBD such as near Port Shepstone High School, Shell petrol station and opposite the Oribi Plaza Shopping Centre. Bus companies that operate long-distance routes to and from Port Shepstone include Intercape, Intercity, Greyhound and Citiliner.

=== Rail ===
Port Shepstone railway station opened in 1917, serving as both the southern terminus of the Cape gauge line from & to Durban, as well as the southern coastal terminus of the narrow gauge Alfred County Railway to Harding via Izotsha and Paddock.

After the standard gauge Transnet passenger services shut down in 1986, the ACR continued operations until 2005, when the famous Banana Express ceased operation.

=== Roads ===
Port Shepstone is located at the Marburg Interchange (Exit 45), where the N2, R61, and R102 converge. Here, the N2 coming southward from Durban branches west toward Kokstad, while the R102 splits off northeast along the coast towards Melville and Hibberdene. The R61 also originates in Marburg, heading south towards Margate and Port Edward.

Now, there is currently construction of the N2 Wild Coast Toll Route, which will effectively re-designate the R61 highway heading south from the Marburg Interchange past Port Edward as the N2 (it will no-longer be designated as the R61) once the new route is complete. Also, the road from Marburg westwards past Kokstad will effectively be re-designated as the R102 (it will no-longer be designated as the N2).

Port Shepstone is also the northern end of the R620 (Marine Drive) which runs south along the coast through Shelly Beach, Uvongo, Margate, Ramsgate and Southbroom. Additional access routes include:

- Rethman Drive and P68 (St Faith's Road) connecting eMthenteni to St Faith's.
- P200 (Izotsha Road) connecting Marburg to Izotsha and Gamalakhe

==== Tolling ====
The N2 and R61 form the South Coast Toll Route between Southbroom and Hibberdene. Traffic entering Port Shepstone from the north to continue on the R61 (toward Port Edward), the N2 (toward Durban), or exiting at exit 45 must pass through the Oribi Toll Plaza mainline. Southbound traffic joining the R61 from exit 45 or exiting there from the south must use the plaza's ramp tolls.

The R102 to Hibberdene provides a toll-free alternative to the N2, while the R620 to Margate and Southbroom serves as a toll-free option to the R61.

==== Road infrastructure upgrades ====
The KwaZulu-Natal Department of Transport closed the uMzimkhulu River Bridge to traffic on 17 March 2025 for emergency repairs. The six-month project, costing R190 million, follows prolonged rainfall and flooding that compromised the bridge's structural integrity.

Connecting Port Shepstone to eMthenteni, Melville, Hibberdene, and serving as an alternative route to Durban, the bridge posed a safety risk. Officials cited its outdated caisson foundation system built in 1958, which has led to pier rotation, further weakening the structure.

The P464 (Sugar Mill Road) and N2 will serve as alternative routes while awaiting approval from SANRAL to waive toll fees at Oribi Toll Plaza. If granted, repairs to both the P464 and the bridge will proceed simultaneously for safer travel.

==== Vehicle registration plates ====
Until December 2023, Port Shepstone and the Lower South Coast region as an entirety maintained a distinct vehicular identity through its "NPS" and “NSC” registration plate prefixes, respectively representing Natal Port Shepstone and Natal South Coast.

== Healthcare ==
=== Hospitals ===
==== Public Hospitals ====
- Port Shepstone Regional Hospital
  - Situated in the Port Shepstone CBD, it is the largest medical facility on the South Coast aimed at serving the region.

==== Private Hospitals ====
- Hibiscus Hospital Port Shepstone
  - Situated in the Port Shepstone CBD, it was formerly named the Hibiscus Private Hospital and is the flagship hospital of the Hibiscus Hospital Group (a hospital group based in KwaZulu-Natal).

=== Clinics ===
==== Municipal clinics ====
- Port Shepstone Clinic
- Umtentweni Clinic
- Southport Clinic

==== Provincial clinics ====
- Marburg Clinic

== Arms ==
Coat of arms of Port Shepstone

Notes
Granted by the Administrator of Natal, 24 November 1966.
Crest
In front of two assegais in saltire Proper a demi-eagle displayed Argent armed and langued Gules with a wreath of oak Vert.
Escutcheon
Per fess enarched Or and Azure an arched stockade Sable between in chief, a wildebeest courant Sable and in base on an ocean wavy Argent charged with a bar wavy Azure a ship in full sail to sinister Sable with dexter an eight-pointed star Argent.
Motto
Stella Aurorae
