= South Coast (KwaZulu-Natal) =

Coastal region in Southern KwaZulu-Natal, South Africa

Location of the KZN South Coast

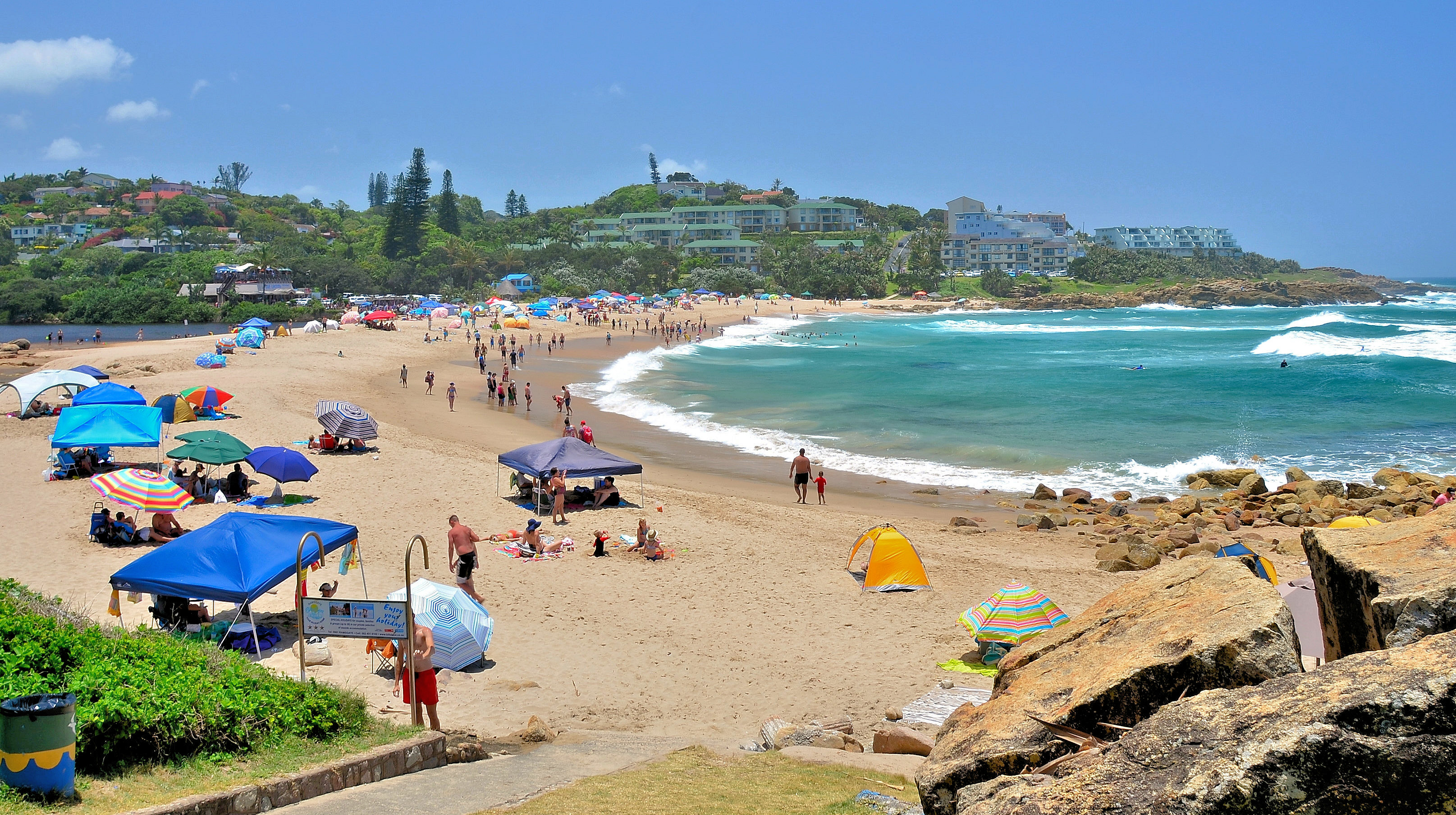
Ramsgate, KwaZulu-Natal South Coast

The KwaZulu-Natal South Coast (better known as the KZN South Coast or just the South Coast) is a region along the southern stretch of coastline of KwaZulu-Natal, South Africa, south of the coastal city of Durban.

The primary hubs of the South Coast are Port Shepstone and Amanzimtoti with several other coastal hubs at Kingsburgh, Margate, Port Edward, Shelly Beach, Scottburgh and Umkomaas whilst Harding and Umzinto have developed as primary commercial centres for the hinterland. These serve as the main towns for the coastal region with the highest concentration of commercial activities.

== Demographics ==
As of 2016, the Ugu District Municipality which governs within official boundaries of the South Coast has a population of 753,336 people compared to 2011 where it had a population of 689,051 which indicates that between 2011 and 2016 the population grew at about 8.5%. The annual population growth was 2.03% and the number of men per 100 females decreased from 91.8% in 2011 to 88.4% in 2016.

== Geography ==
The officially defined boundaries of the South Coast coincide with the boundaries of the Ugu District Municipality, stretching from Scottburgh in the north to Port Edward in the south and Harding in the west. Traditionally though, the South Coast has been understood to extend as far as Amanzimtoti to the north. The region is neighboured by East Griqualand to the west, Durban to the north, the Midlands to the north-west and the Wild Coast region of the Eastern Cape to the south.

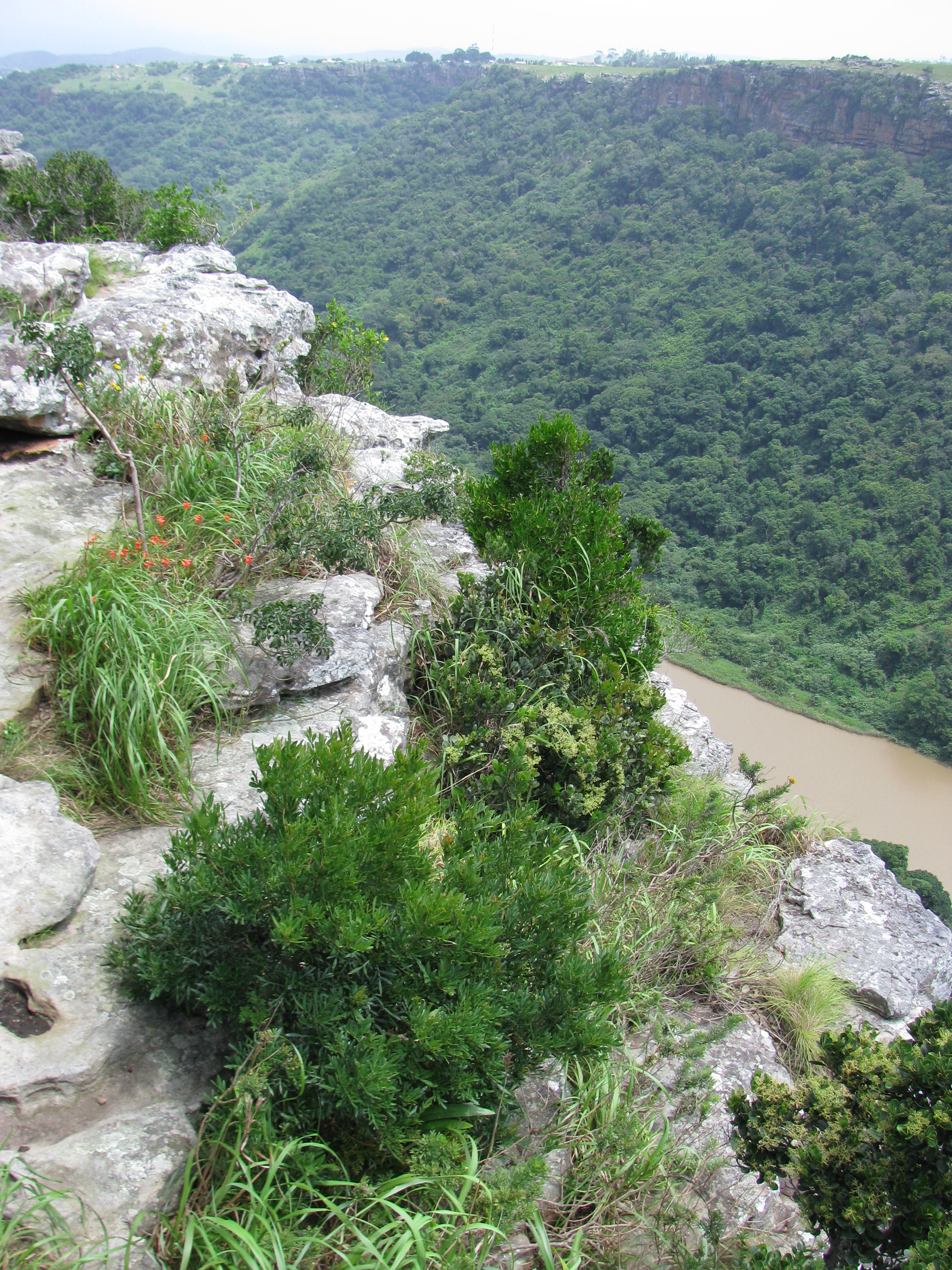
Mtamvuna River Gorge which forms the border between KwaZulu-Natal and the Eastern Cape

Major rivers of the South Coast include the uMtamvuna River, uMpenjati River, uMbizane River, uMzimkhulu River, uMzumbe River, uMthwalume River, uMpambanyoni River, uMkhomazi River, iLovu River and the eZimbokodweni River to an extent. The uMtamvuna River marks the southernmost border of the South Coast and the KwaZulu-Natal province bordering with the Eastern Cape province.

== Law and government ==
The South Coast is officially governed by the Ugu District Municipality (consists of Ray Nkonyeni, uMuziwabantu, uMzumbe and uMdoni municipalities) with its seat in Port Shepstone, with the stretch of coastline between Clansthal and Amanzimtoti governed by the eThekwini Metropolitan Municipality with its seat in Durban.

The South Coast is mainly split into five local government areas:

- Ray Nkonyeni and uMzumbe local municipalities administer the Lower South Coast (Hibiscus Coast)
- uMdoni Local Municipality administers the Mid South Coast (uMdoni Coast & Country)
- eThekwini Metropolitan Municipality administers the Upper South Coast (Sapphire Coast)
- uMuziwabantu Local Municipality administers Harding and surroundings.

== Subregions ==
It is divided into four subregions which are the Sapphire Coast, uMdoni Coast & Country, Hibiscus Coast and Harding and surrounds.

=== Sapphire Coast ===
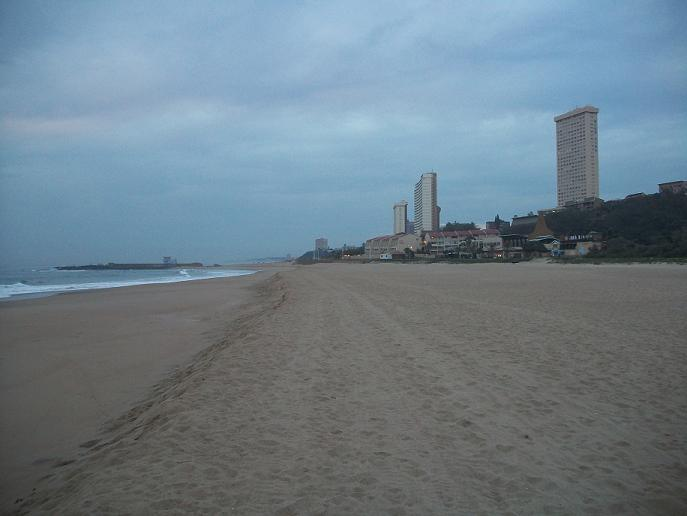
Amanzimtoti, located just south of Durban

The Upper South Coast better known as the Sapphire Coast stretches from Amanzimtoti to Clansthal near Umkomaas and has historically been a popular holiday destination. It is situated south of Durban with Amanzimtoti serving as its primary urban centre whilst Kingsburgh and Umkomaas serve as secondary urban centres.

The following main towns form part of the Sapphire Coast:

- Amanzimtoti (eManzimtoti)
- Clansthal
- Craigieburn
- Ilfracombe
- Kingsburgh
- Magabeni
- Umgababa
- Umkomaas (eMkhomazi)

=== uMdoni Coast & Country ===
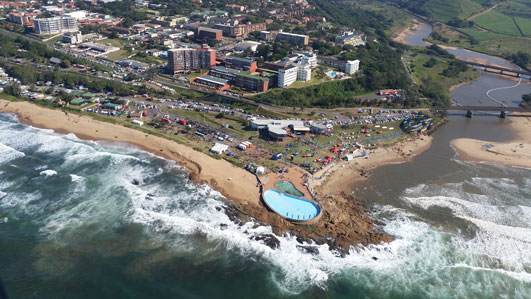
Scottburgh, the administrative centre and largest town on the uMdoni Coast & Country

uMdoni Coast and Country, better known as the “Mid South Coast”, is situated south of the eThekwini Metropolitan Municipality (Greater Durban Metro), stretching from Scottburgh in the north to Mthwalume in the south, with Scottburgh as its primary town.

The following main towns and settlements form part of the uMdoni Coast and Country:

- Amahlongwa
- Amandawe
- Bazley Beach
- Dududu
- Ifafa Beach
- KwaCele
- Mtwalume
- Park Rynie
- Pennington
- Scottburgh
- Sezela
- Umzinto

=== Hibiscus Coast ===
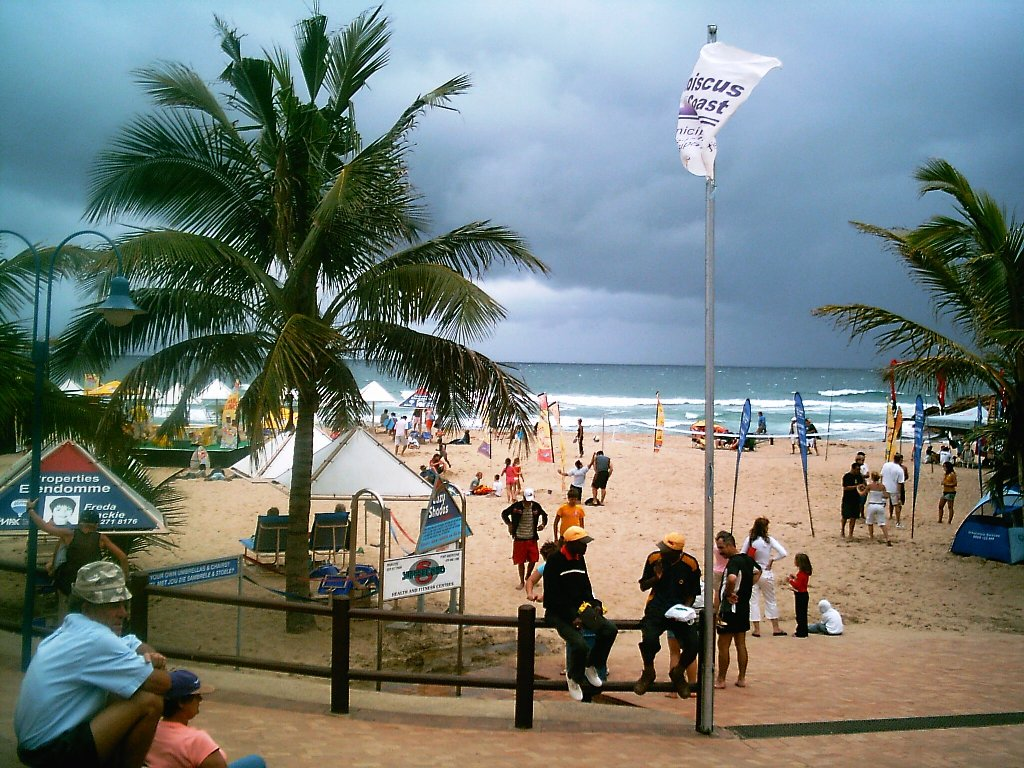
Margate, the holiday "capital" of the KwaZulu-Natal South Coast which is located in the Hibiscus Coast

The Hibiscus Coast, also known as the “Lower South Coast”, stretches along the southernmost coastline of KwaZulu-Natal between Hibberdene in the north, Port Edward in the south and Izingolweni in the west.

The Hibiscus Coast is the ultimate economic booster of the South Coast due its location and is host to the region’s economic capital, Port Shepstone. It is known as the 'beach holiday mecca' of KwaZulu-Natal and is known for its 'unending' Hibiscus trees found along the coast.

The following main towns/areas form part of the Hibiscus Coast:

- Boboyi
- Hibberdene
- Izingolweni
- Izotsha
- Margate
- Murchison
- Paddock
- Port Edward
- Port Shepstone
- Ramsgate
- Shelly Beach
- Southbroom
- St Faith's
- Uvongo

=== Harding and Surrounds ===
Harding is a small town located halfway between Port Shepstone and Kokstad in Griqualand East. It is famous for its sawmills in the Weza area and the Ingeli Forest. The area mainly consists of the main areas of Harding and Weza.

== Healthcare ==
The KZN South Coast currently has ten hospitals serving the coastal region with various options in terms of public and private healthcare.

=== Public Hospitals ===
- Dunstan Farell Hospital, Hibberdene
- G.J Crookes Hospital, Scottburgh
- Murchsion District Hospital, Murchison, near Port Shepstone
- Port Shepstone Regional Hospital, Port Shepstone
- St Andrew's Provincial Hospital, Harding

=== Private Hospitals ===
- Hibiscus Hospital Port Shepstone, Port Shepstone
- Hibiscus Hospital Scottburgh, Scottburgh
- Netcare Kingsway Hospital, Amanzimtoti
- Netcare Margate Hospital, Margate
- Shelly Beach Hospital, Shelly Beach

== Golfing ==
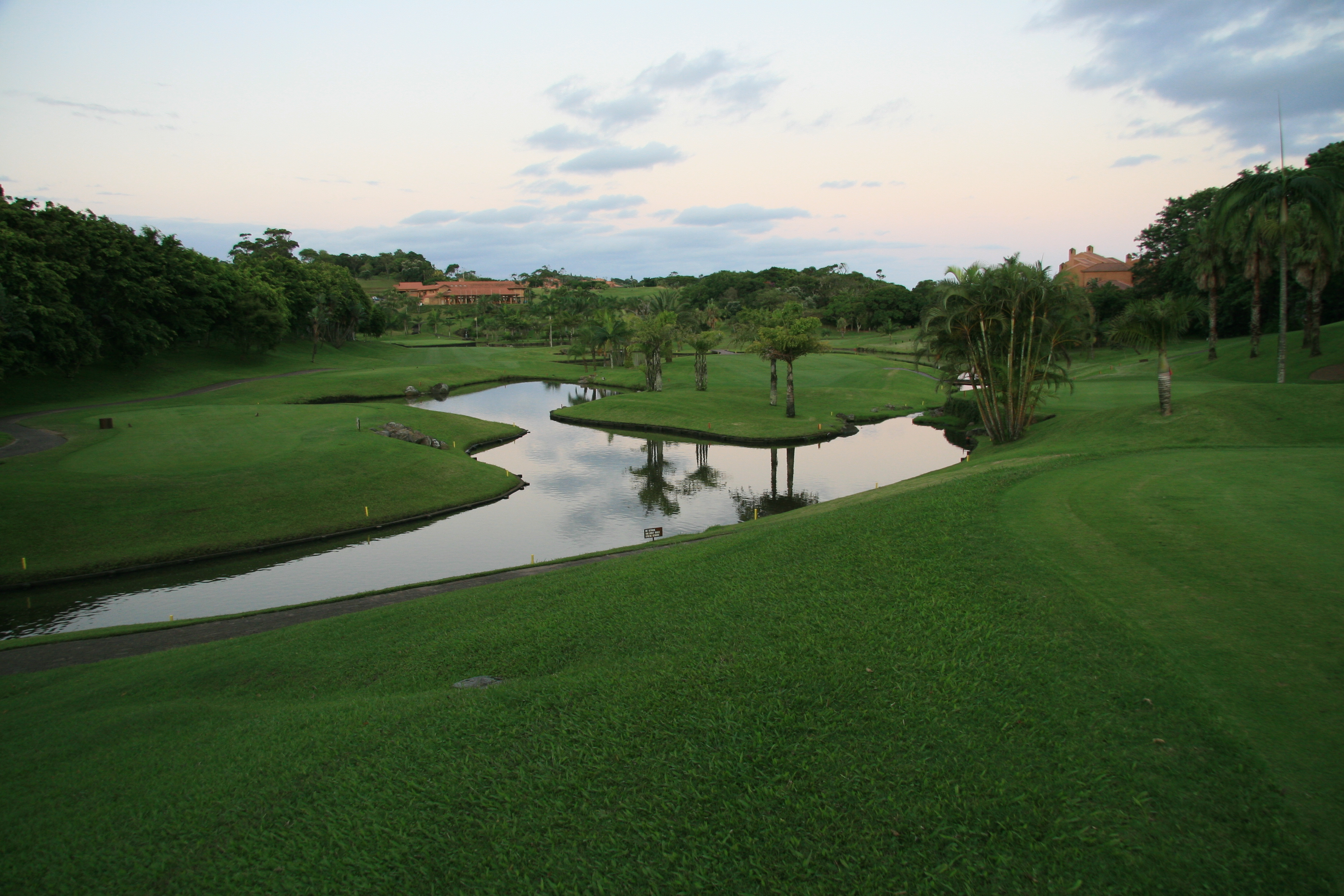
San Lameer Golf Course

The South Coast has earned its nickname as the “Golf Coast” of South Africa as it has more golf courses than any other section of South Africa; many of them are 18-hole courses and are in the country's top 100 courses. They include:

- Amanzimtoti Country Club
- Harding Golf Club
- Hibberdene Golf Club
- Margate Country Club
- Port Edward Country Club
- Port Shepstone Country Club
- San Lameer Golf Course, Southbroom
- Scottburgh Golf Club
- Selborne Golf Club, Pennington
- Southbroom Golf Club
- Umdoni Golf Club, Pennington
- Umkomaas Golf Club

== Tourism ==
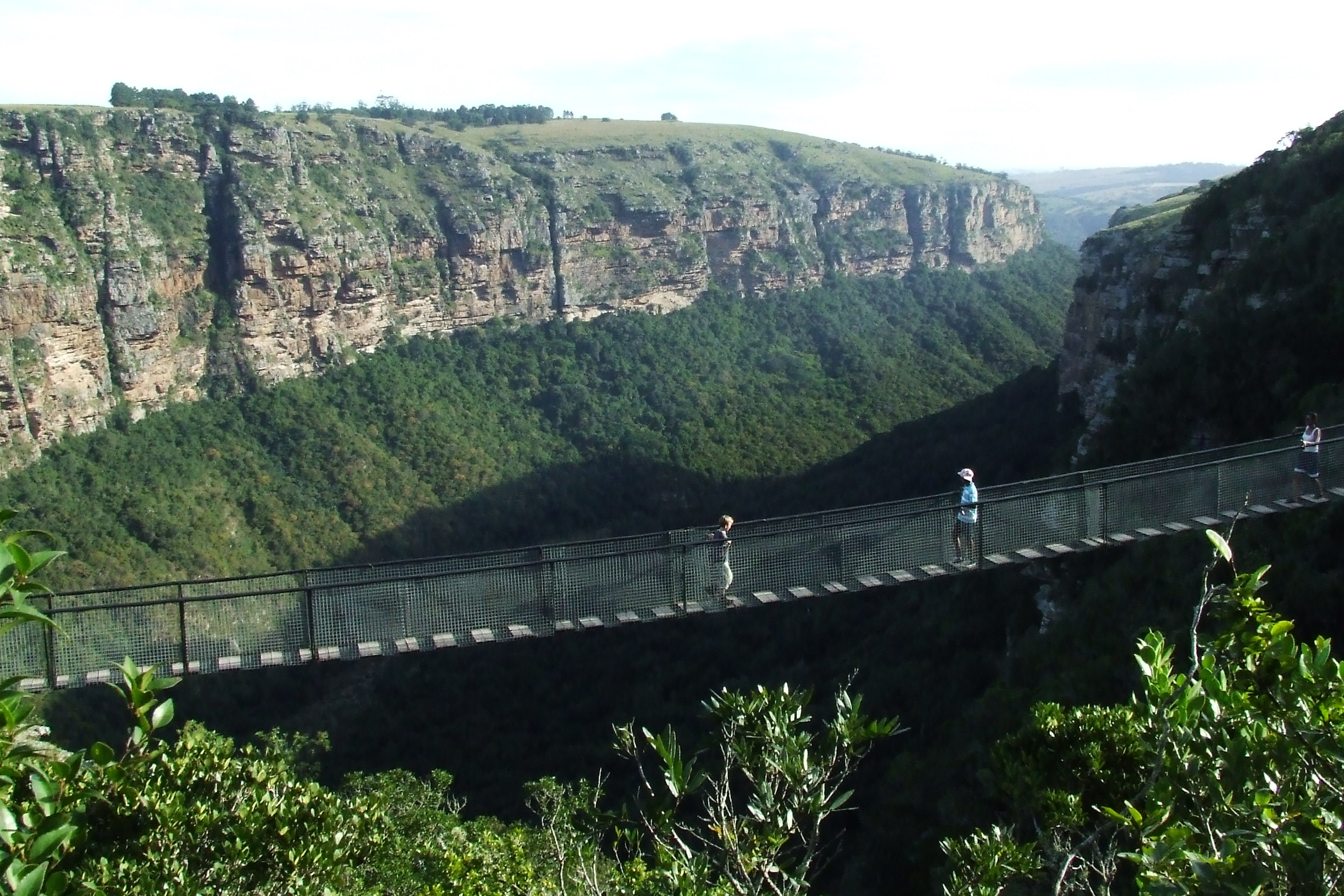
Oribi Gorge, KwaZulu-Natal

The South Coast is a major tourist destination with a sunny, subtropical climate and has become widely known for its world-class surfing beaches, with Margate as the “holiday capital” of the region. Most of the coastal region is highly seasonal, with a large proportion of second homes used exclusively during peak holiday periods which is usually from about mid-December to mid-January.

The South Coast is home to a myriad of significant attractions such as:

- Avuxeni Adventures
- Aqua Planet Dive Centre
- Butterfly Valley
- Crocworld Conservation Centre
- Ingeli Forest
- Mac Banana
- Macbutterflies
- Margate Art Museum
- Oribi Gorge Nature Reserve
- Port Shepstone Lighthouse
- Port Edward Lighthouse
- Pure Venom
- Red Desert Nature Conservation Area
- Riverbend Crocodile Farm
- Stephward Estate Exotic Nursery
- Aliwal Shoal
- Umtamvuna Nature Reserve
- Wild Coast Sun

== Agriculture and forestry ==
The South Coast has a substantial agricultural and forestry sector, with the main farming categories including sugarcane, bananas, macadamia nuts, tea tree oil, timber and coffee.

=== Bananas ===
The Lower South Coast is one of the best suited and renowned areas in KwaZulu-Natal for banana production, due to its subtropical climatic conditions, hence it accounts for the bulk of banana production in the province, even though the province only accounts for 18% of bananas produced in South Africa (as of 2002). In recent years, there has been a declining demand of bananas from KwaZulu-Natal due to competing countries such as neighbouring Mozambique and eSwatini, which has resulted in many banana farmers along the Lower South Coast shifting towards macadamia nut farming instead.

=== Coffee ===
Coffee is a small-scale yet lucrative product grown along the Lower South Coast, with two speciality coffee farms including Mpenjati, near Munster and Beaver Creek Coffee Estate, near Port Edward.

=== Forestry ===
Due to the undulating nature of the South Coast, there is a substantial amount of timber plantations across the Lower South Coast, with extensive timber plantations surrounding the small towns of Harding and Weza in the far inland areas.

=== Macadamia ===
The macadamia industry has seen a boom in the agricultural industry of the South Coast, during the past few years, with many farmers switching from farming sugarcane and bananas to macadamia nuts, offering highly attractive investment opportunities. Most of the macadamia nuts are farmed on the Lower South Coast, specifically around Port Edward and Oribi Flats.

=== Sugar ===
Although the majority of sugar production in South Africa takes place on the North Coast of KwaZulu-Natal, the South Coast has historically been a sugar-producing area starting in 1846 with the establishment of a sugar mill in Umzinto. Today, the South Coast currently has two sugar mills, Umzimkhulu near Port Shepstone and Sezela near Pennington, both owned by Illovo Sugar. However, over the past few years, similarly to bananas there has also been a significant shift from sugar cane to macadamia nut farming.

== Transport ==
=== Vehicle registration plates ===
Prior to 1 December 2023, the South Coast had four vehicle registrations plate configurations starting with N which stood for Natal.

- NA- Harding
- ND- Amanzimtoti, Kingsburgh
- NX- Scottburgh, Pennington, Park Rynie, Umkomaas, Umzinto
- NPS/NSC- Port Shepstone, Hibberdene, Margate, Southbroom, Port Edward

=== Air ===
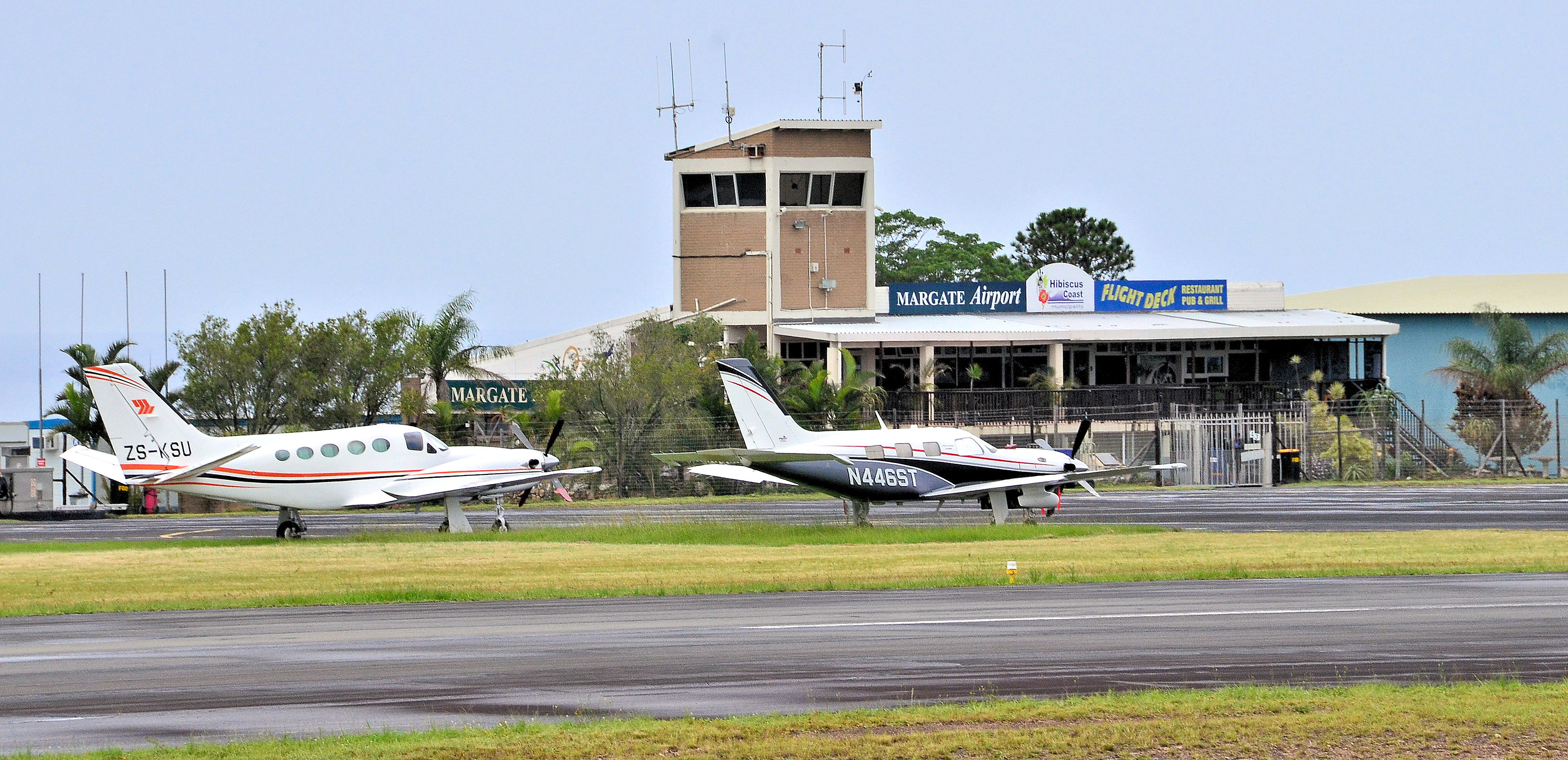
Margate Airport is the main airport of the KZN South Coast

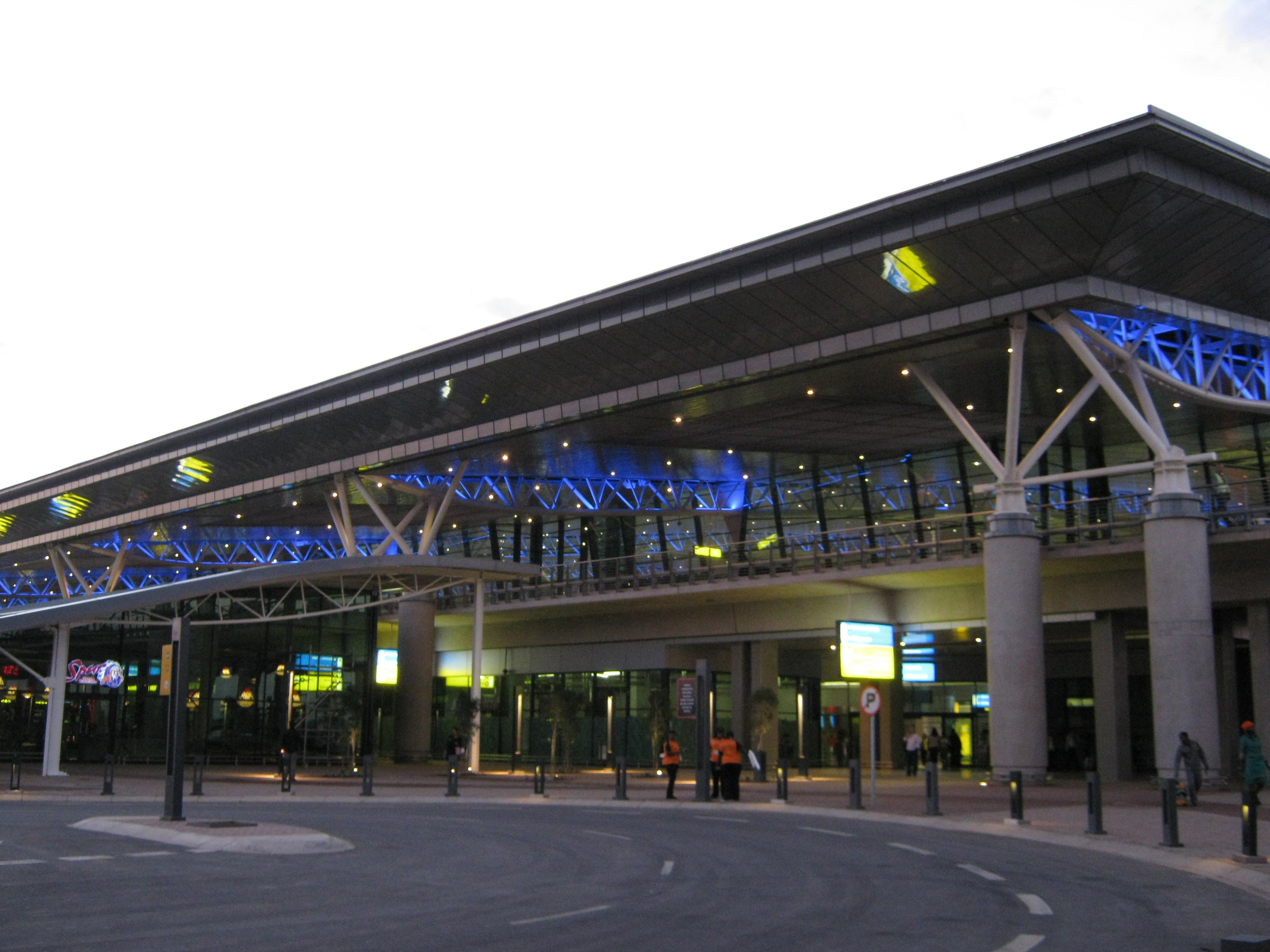
King Shaka International Airport is the nearest international airport

The South Coast is served by Margate Airport which currently has scheduled weekly flights to Johannesburg operated by CemAir though many tourists also arrive from the King Shaka International Airport, north of Durban which has a wider variety of scheduled flights to other domestic destinations in South Africa as well as international destinations such as Doha, Dubai, Gaborone, Harare, Istanbul and Manzini.

=== Roads ===
The South Coast is intersected by one national route, the N2 and five regional routes including the R61, R102, R603, R620 and R612.

- The N2 from Port Shepstone leads northwards as a freeway along the coast towards Durban, KwaDukuza and Empangeni and westwards into the interior towards Kokstad and Mthatha in the Eastern Cape. Other than Durban, the N2 also provides a connection to other South African coastal cities such as East London, Gqeberha (Port Elizabeth) and Cape Town.
- The R61 leads southwards from Port Shepstone to Southbroom as a freeway and continues to Port Edward crossing into the Eastern Cape towards Mthatha and ending in Beaufort West in the Western Cape province.
- The R102 leads northwards along the coast from Port Shepstone towards Melville, Hibberdene, Pennington, Park Rynie, Scottburgh, Umkomaas, Umgababa, Kingsburgh and Amanzimtoti. From Amanzimtoti, the R102 continues northwards towards Durban.
- The R603 leads north-westwards into the interior from Kingsburgh to Umbumbulu and Umlaas Road, near Camperdown between Durban and Pietermaritzburg.
- The R612 leads westwards into the interior from Park Rynie to Umzinto, Ixopo, Donnybrook and Bulwer.
- The R620 runs along the coastline between Port Shepstone and Southbroom and connects the coastal areas of Oslo Beach, Shelly Beach, St Michael’s-on-Sea, Uvongo, Manaba Beach, Margate and Ramsgate.

The largest traffic volumes pass along the N2 from Durban towards Port Shepstone, and further towards Kokstad, as well as the R61 from Port Shepstone towards Port Edward. Large volumes of traffic also pass along the R612 from Park Rynie to Ixopo, and St Faith’s Road from Umtentweni (north of Port Shepstone) to St Faith’s.

The South Coast Toll Road which comprises the N2 freeway between Hibberdene and Port Shepstone and the R61 freeway between Port Shepstone and Southbroom includes three toll plazas including Izotsha Ramp Plaza (Shelly Beach), Oribi Toll Plaza (Port Shepstone) and the Umtentweni Ramp Plaza (Port Shepstone).

R102 serves as an alternative route between Durban and Port Shepstone and is commonly used by motorists wishing to avoid tolling at the Umtentweni and Oribi toll plazas in Port Shepstone whilst the R620 serves as an alternative route between Southbroom and Port Shepstone and is commonly used by motorists wishing to avoid tolling in Shelly Beach at the Izotsha Ramp Plaza.

==== Road Infrastructure Projects ====
The R600 million road rehabilitation project of the R620 (Marine Drive) between Port Shepstone and Southbroom, a 25km stretch is now at the halfway mark, with minor work currently underway, including the installation of kerbing, concrete side drains, guardrails, and subsoil drains. According to the contractor, Raubex, approximately 50% of the sub-base and base course and 20% of the auxiliary works have been completed as of October 2024. The project, which includes provisions for local Targeted Enterprises and Training, is set for completion in January 2026, weather permitting. Stop-and-go systems, which will only be implemented during the day, are in place at key sections to manage traffic flow.

- Southbroom to Pistols Saloon (Ramsgate): March 18 – mid-October 2024
- Chefs on Marine (Ramsgate) to Waffle House (Ramsgate): April 8 – end of October 2024
- Bosveld Butchery to Margate Police Station: July 15 – mid-November 2024
- Sasol Margate to Builders Express Manaba: August 26 – mid-November 2024

Additionally, 50% of the rehabilitation between Uvongo and Shelly Beach is complete, with the remaining work scheduled to begin in mid-October and take approximately three weeks.

Other key upgrades include:

- My Happy Place Coffee Shop (Shelly Beach) to Port Shepstone: Asphalt replacement from mid-October 2024 to mid-2025
- Asphalt overlay works: Mid-2025 – end of 2025

== Media ==
=== Newspaper ===
Newspapers published on the South Coast include the South Coast Herald, South Coast Fever, South Coast Sun, Southlands Sun and Mid South Coast Rising Sun.

=== Radio ===
In terms of radio, East Coast Radio and Ukhozi FM are the main radio stations mainly serving the whole province of KwaZulu-Natal.
