= Ray Nkonyeni Local Municipality =

Ray Nkonyeni
- Local municipality
- Coordinates: 30°47′S 30°15′E
- Country: South Africa
- Province: KwaZulu-Natal
- District: Ugu
- Seat: Port Shepstone

Government
  - Type: Municipal council

Area
  - Total: 1,487 km^{2} (574 sq mi)

Population (2022)
  - Total: 362,134
  - Density: 243.5/km^{2} (630.7/sq mi)

Racial makeup (2022)
  - Black African: 83.0%
  - White African: 9.9%
  - Indian/Asian: 5.6%
  - Coloured: 1.3%
- Time zone: UTC+2 (SAST)
- Municipal code: KZN216

Ray Nkonyeni Municipality (Zulu: UMasipala wase Ray Nkonyeni) is a local municipality within the Ugu District Municipality in South Africa. It is located on the south coast of KwaZulu-Natal. It was established after the August 2016 local elections by merging the Ezinqoleni and Hibiscus Coast local municipalities. As of 2022 it has a population of 362,134.

== Politics ==
The municipal council consists of seventy-one members elected by mixed-member proportional representation. Thirty-six councillors are elected by first-past-the-post voting in thirty-six wards, while the remaining thirty-five are chosen from party lists so that the total number of party representatives is proportional to the number of votes received.

In the election of 4 November 2026 the African National Congress (ANC) lost its majority. No party gained a majority, with the uMkhonto weSizwe Party winning the largest number of seats on the council, 24.

The following table shows the results of the election.

Party	Ward			List			Total seats
Party	Votes	%	Seats	Votes	%	Seats	Total seats
uMkhonto weSizwe Party	35,254	33.32	16	36,375	34.53	8	24
African National Congress	32,011	30.25	9	31,006	29.43	12	21
Democratic Alliance	17,367	16.41	10	18,262	17.34	3	13
Inkatha Freedom Party	9,573	9.05	1	9,436	8.96	5	6
Freedom Front Plus	2,469	2.33	0	2,679	2.54	2	2
Economic Freedom Fighters	2,398	2.27	0	2,474	2.35	2	2
African Transformation Movement	1,312	1.24	0	1,359	1.29	1	1
African Independent Congress	761	0.72	0	916	0.87	1	1
Independent candidates	1,513	1.43	0				0
African Christian Democratic Party	642	0.61	0	643	0.61	1	1
13 other parties	2,510	2.37	0	2,195	2.08	0	0
Total	105,810	100.00	36	105,345	100.00	35	71
Valid votes	105,810	98.47		105,345	98.45		
Invalid/blank votes	1,639	1.53		1,663	1.55		
Total votes	107,449	100.00		107,008	100.00		
Registered voters/turnout	201,141	53.42		201,141	53.20		
