= Seaside resorts in South Africa =

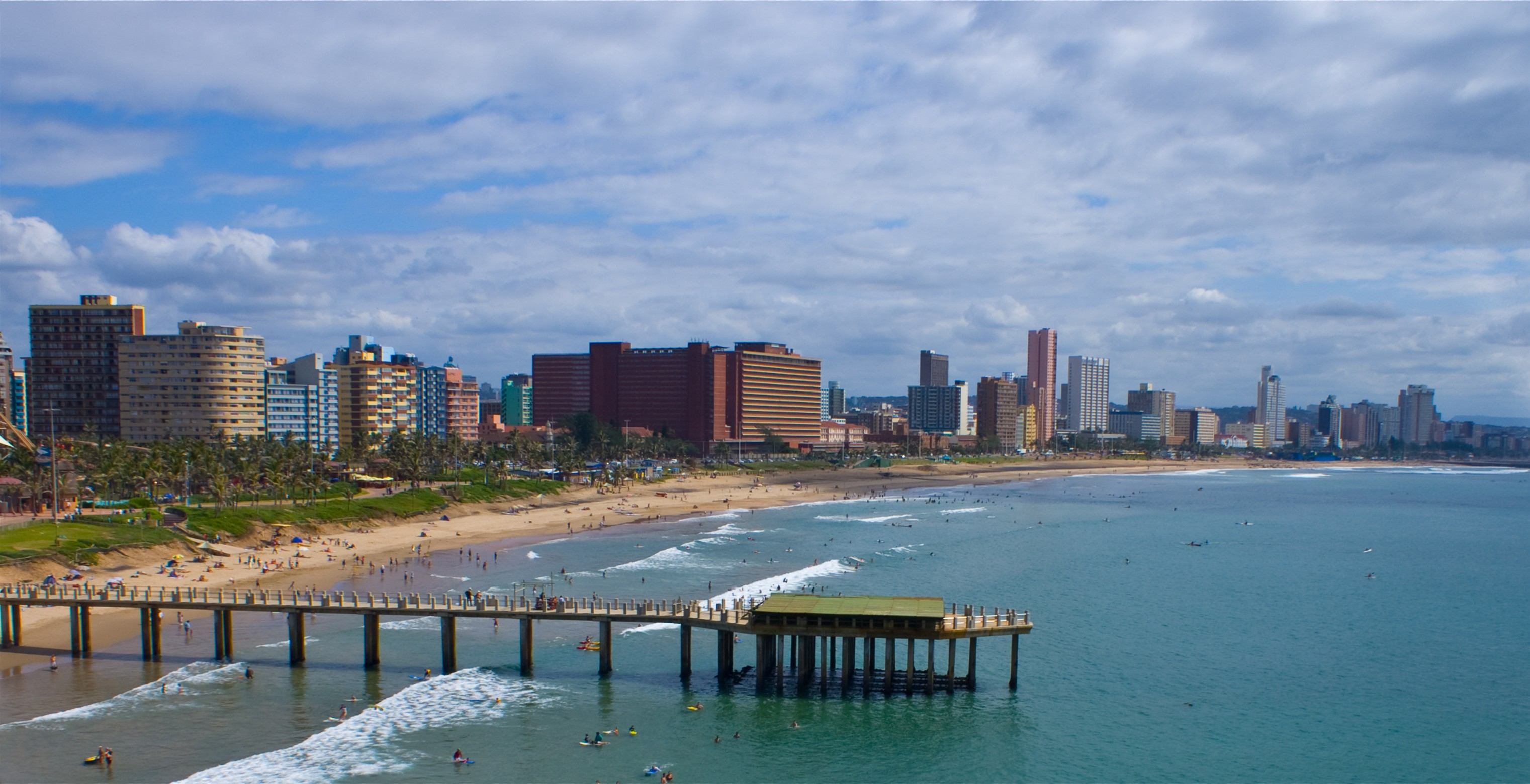
Durban is a major holiday destination on South Africa's east coast and is renowned for its warm weather all-year round

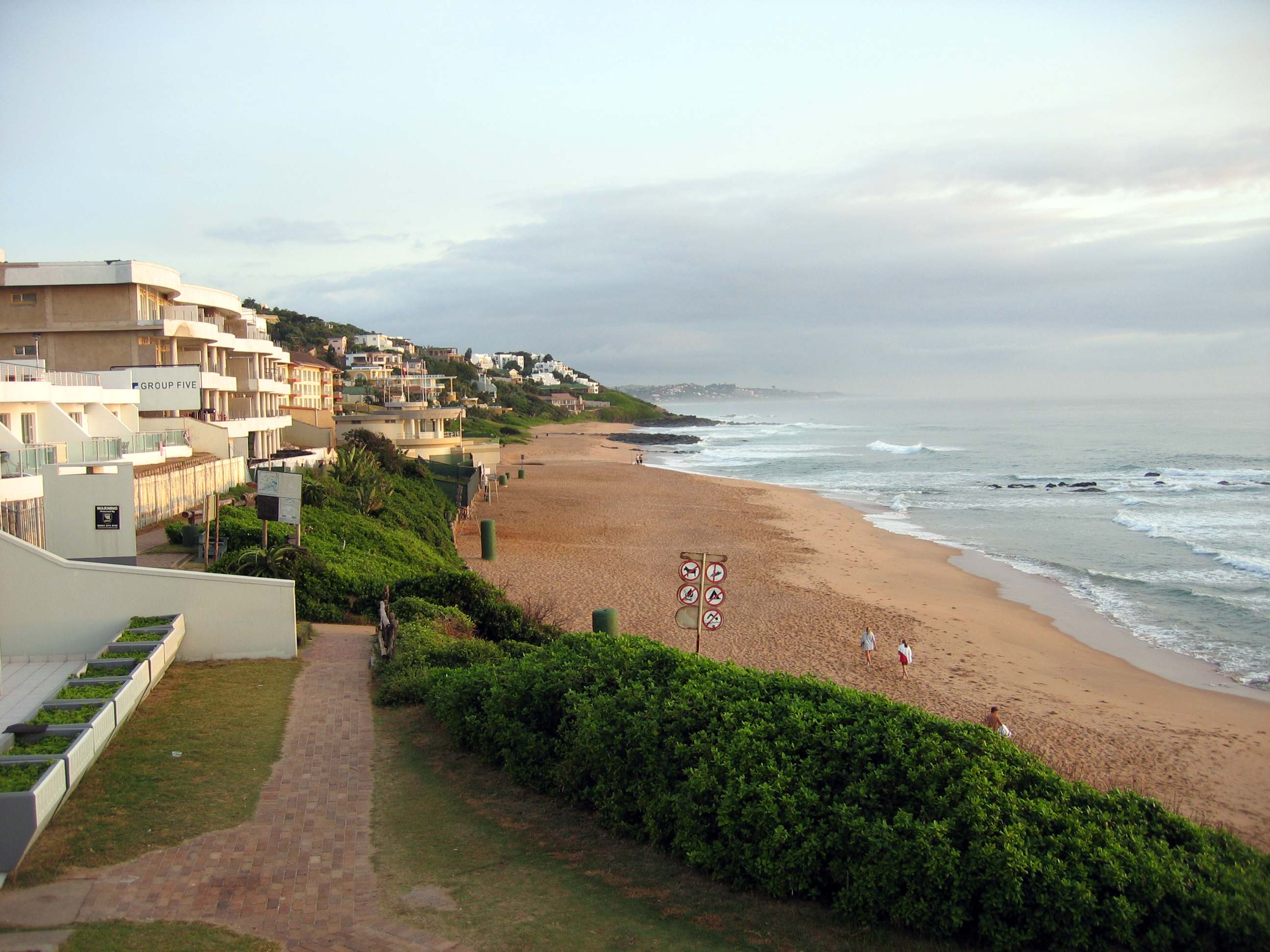
Ballito, KwaZulu-Natal

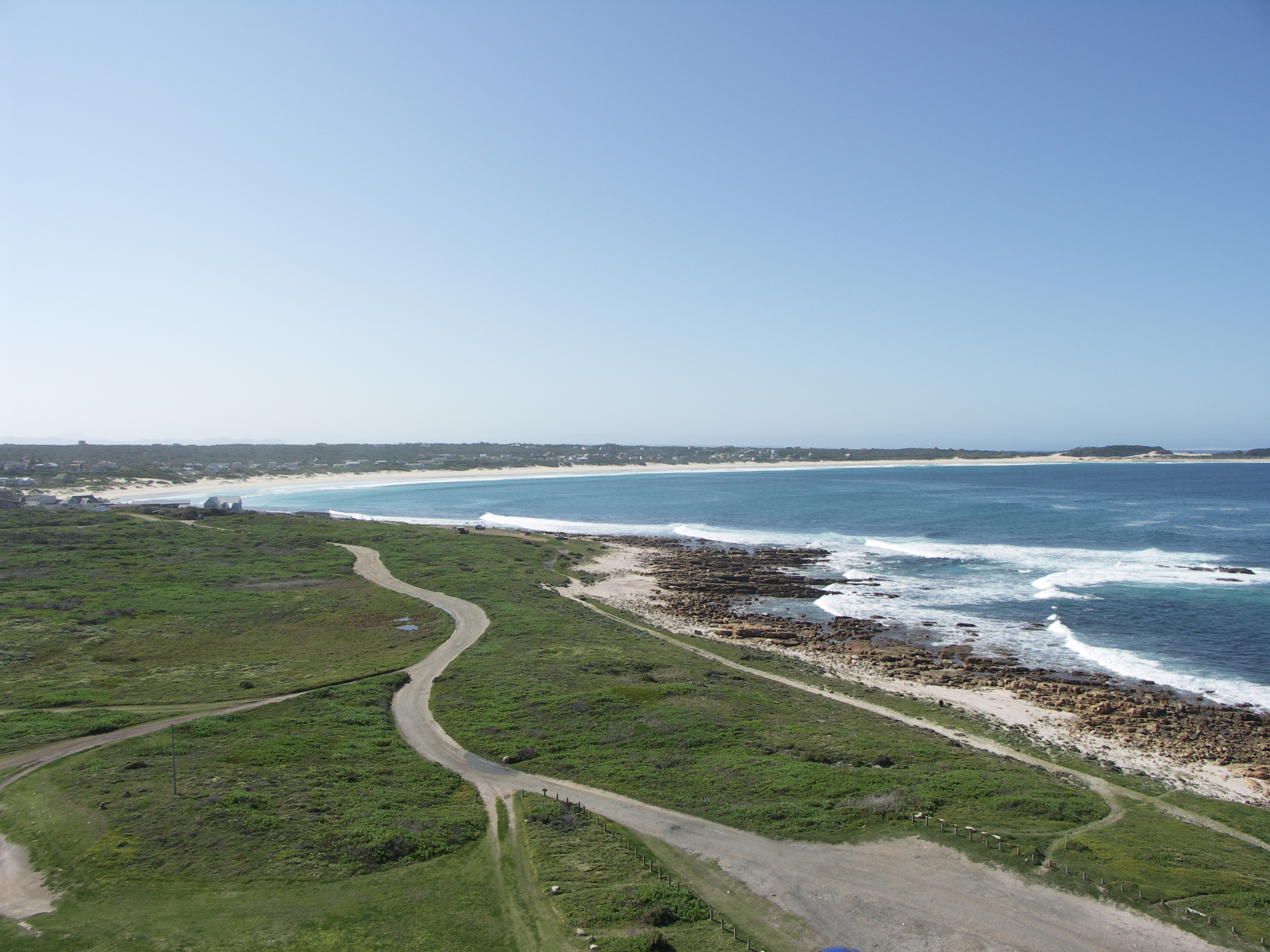
Cape St Francis, Eastern Cape

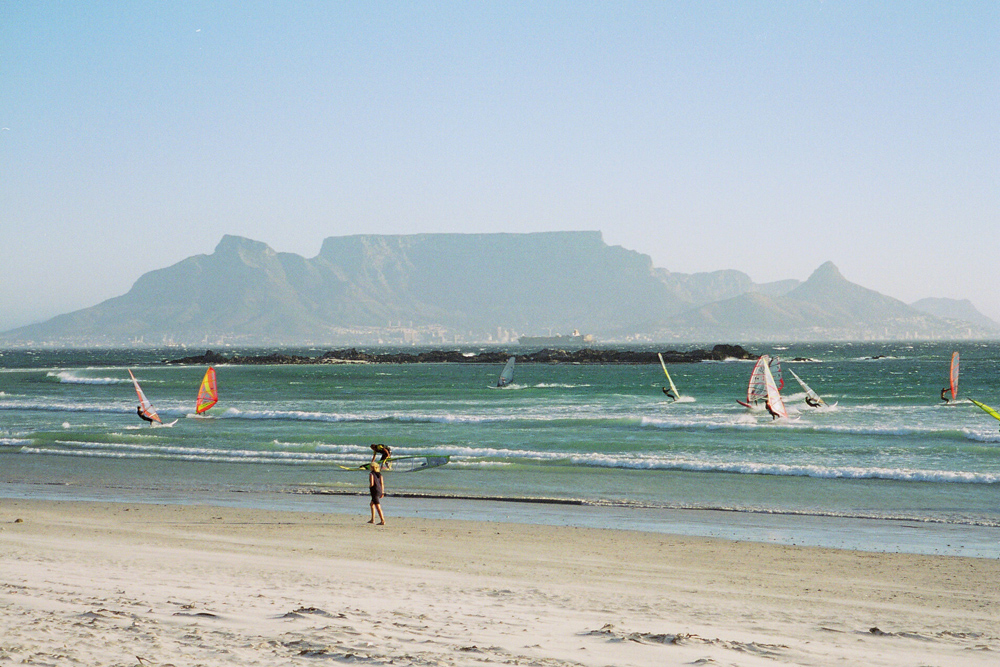
Cape Town, Western Cape

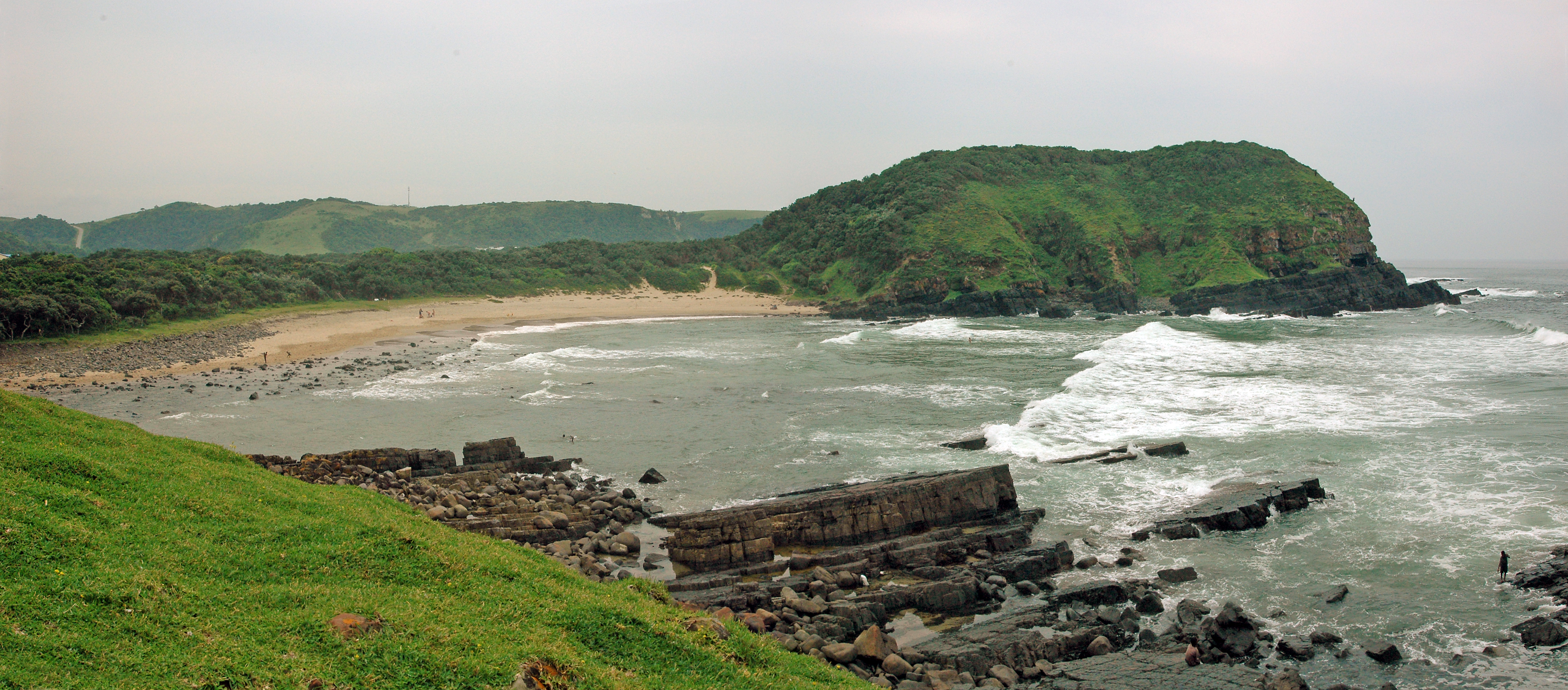
Coffee Bay, Eastern Cape

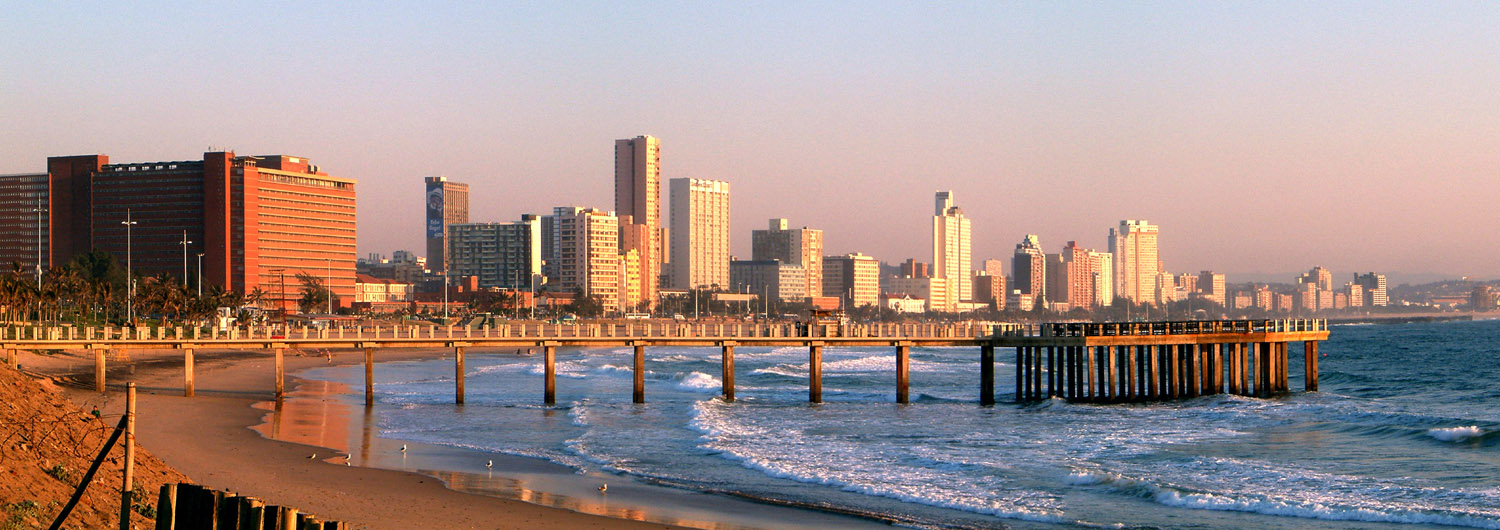
Durban, KwaZulu-Natal

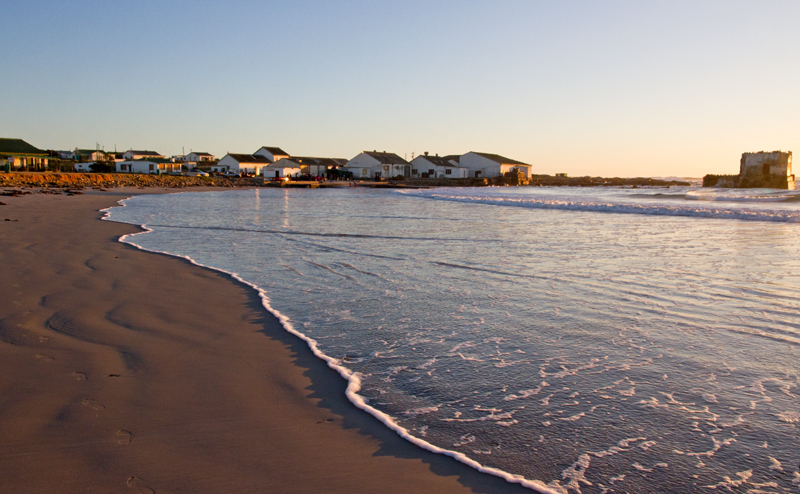
Hondeklip Bay, Northern Cape

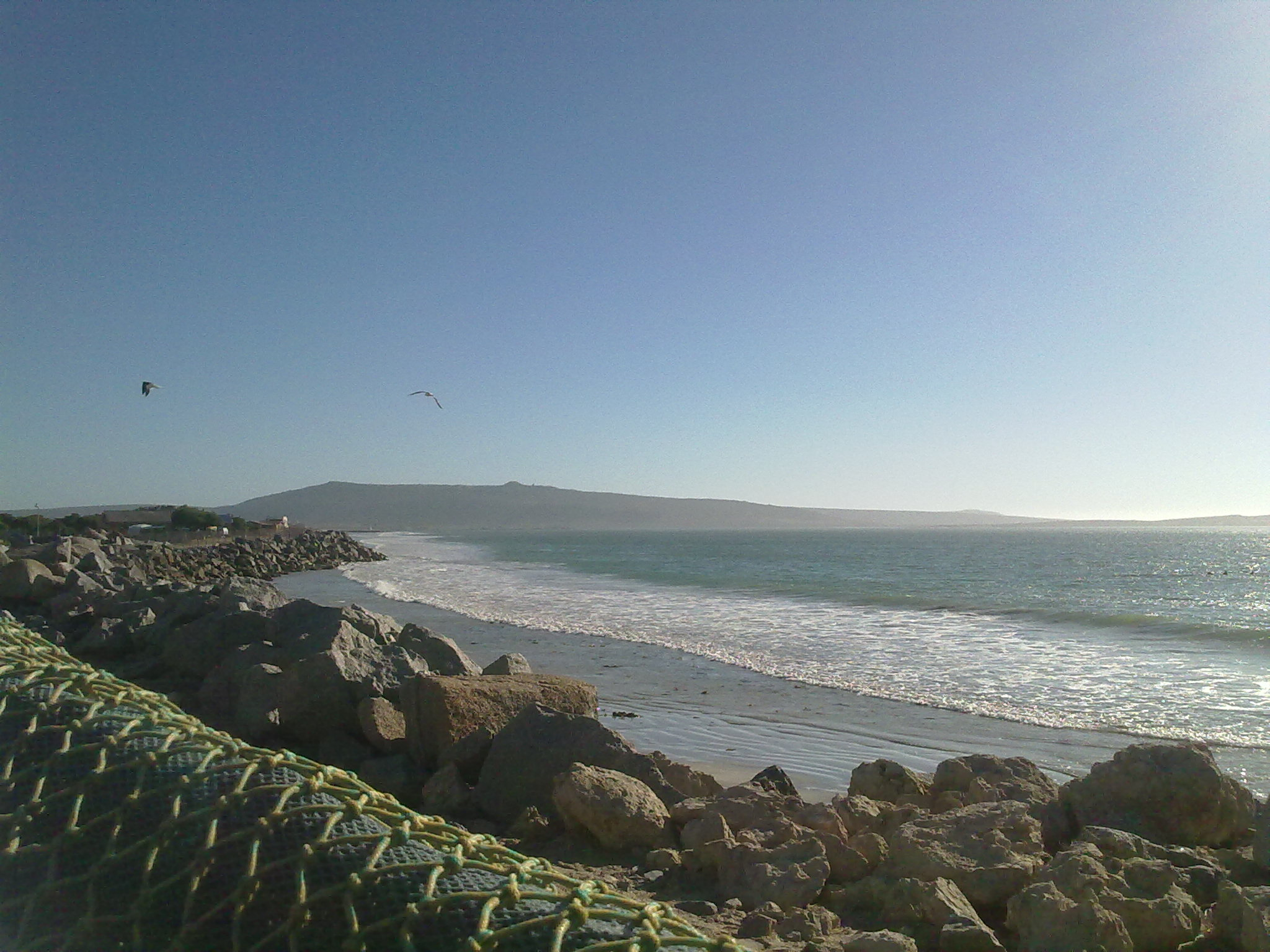
Langebaan, Western Cape

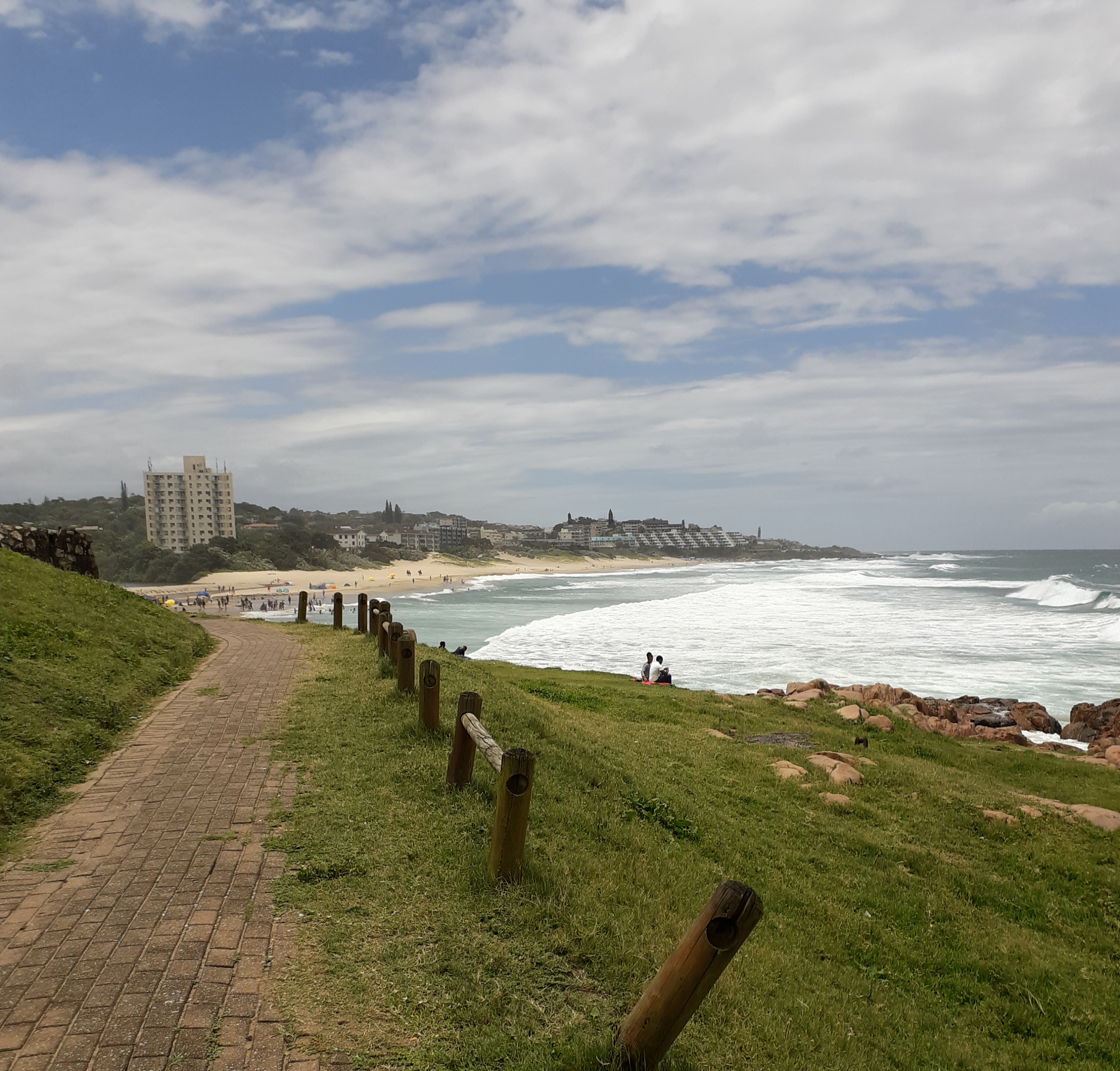
Margate, KwaZulu-Natal

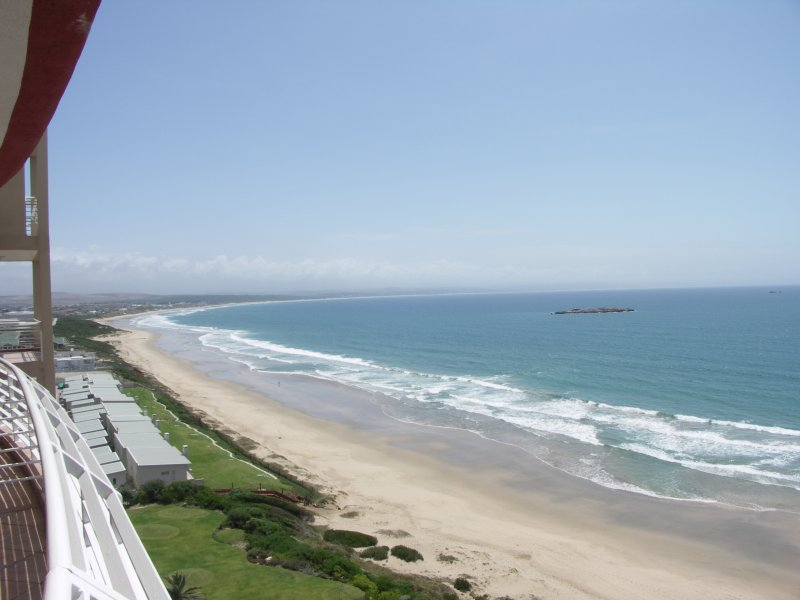
Mossel Bay, Western Cape

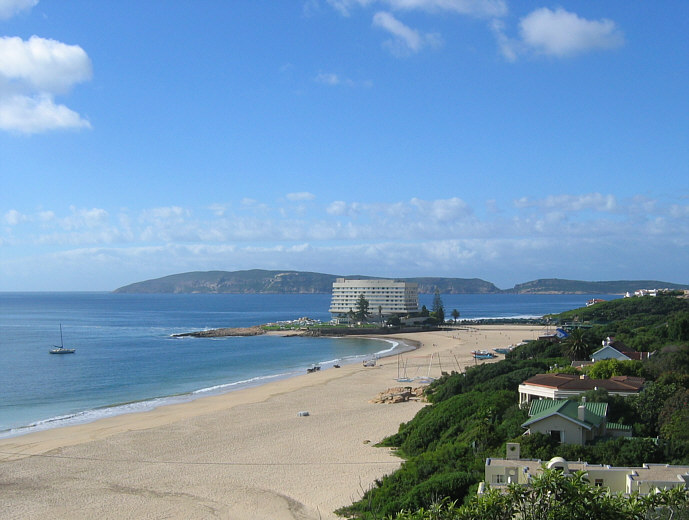
Plettenberg Bay, Western Cape

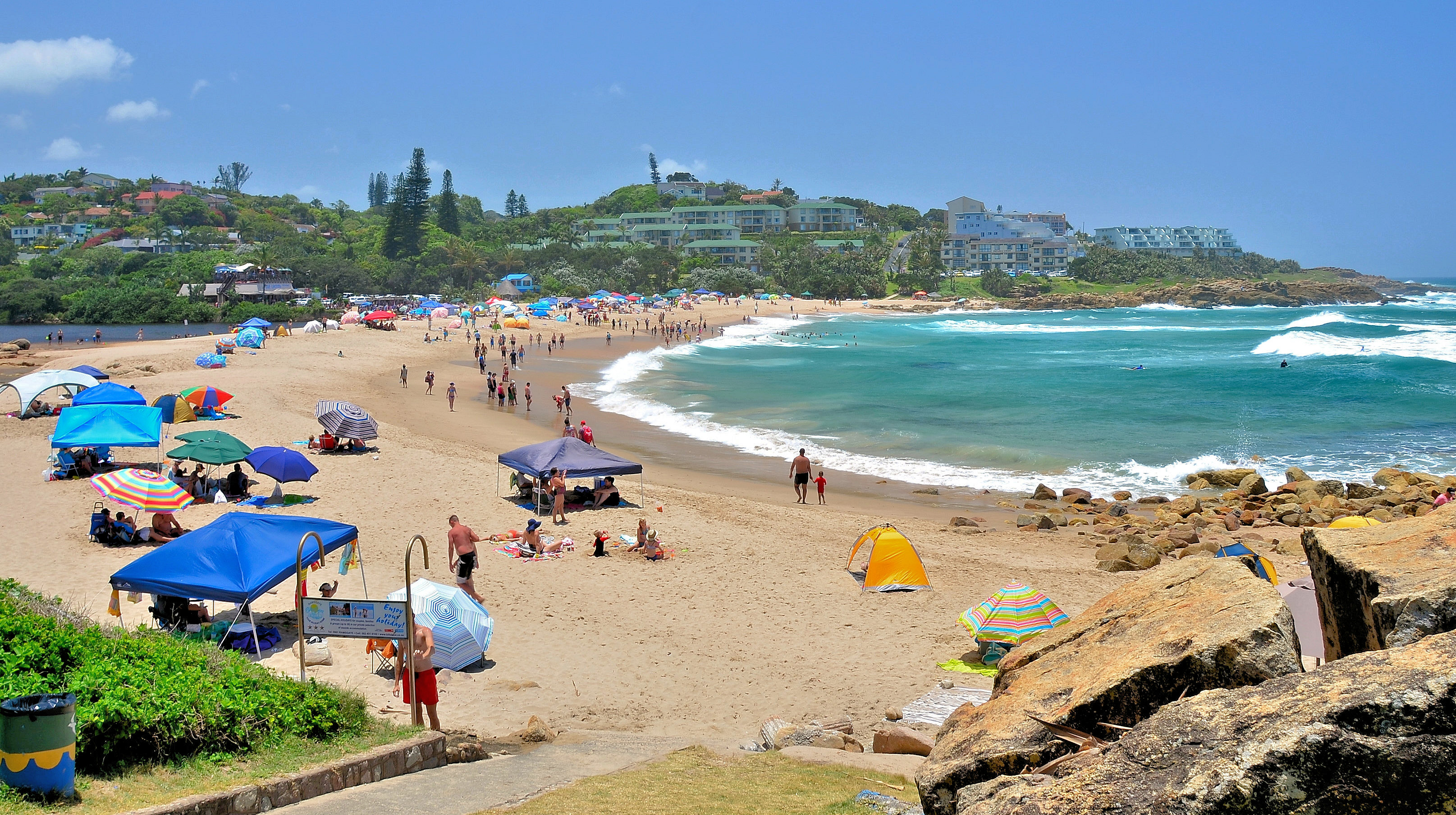
Ramsgate, KwaZulu-Natal

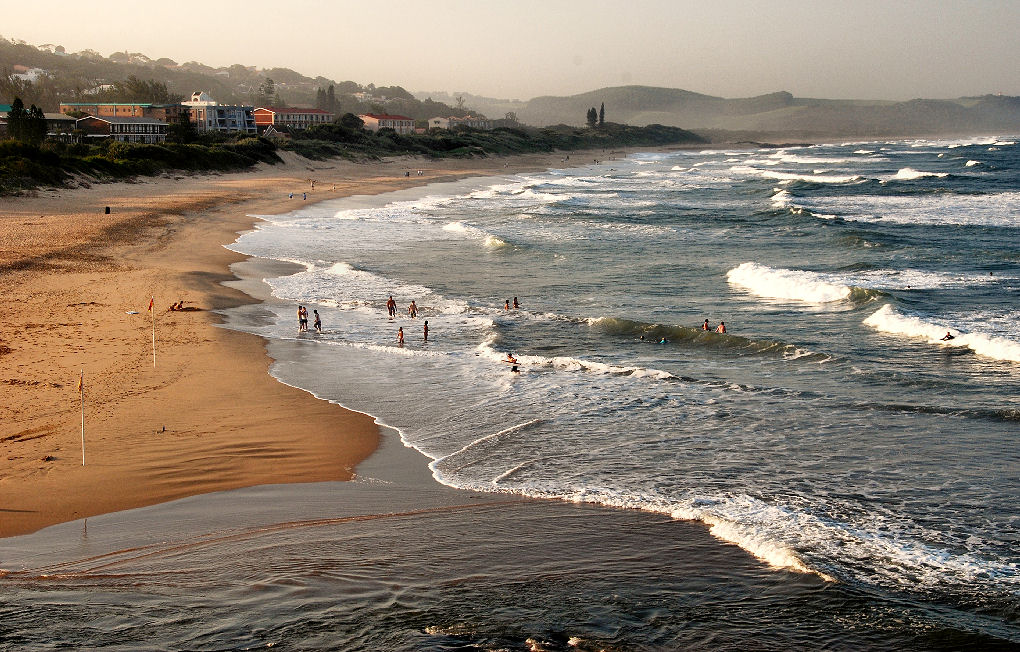
Scottburgh, KwaZulu-Natal

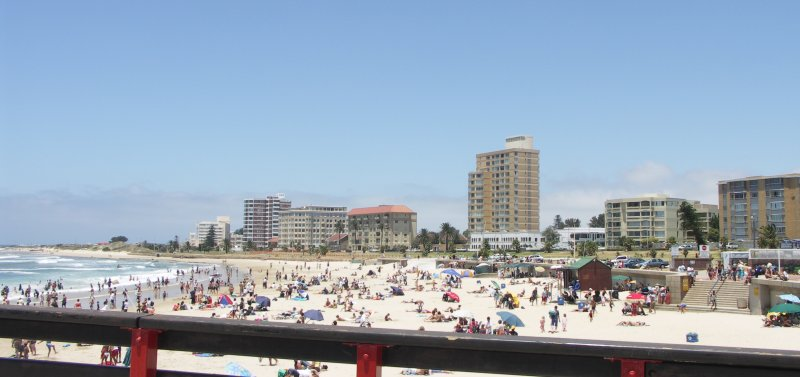
Port Elizabeth, Eastern Cape

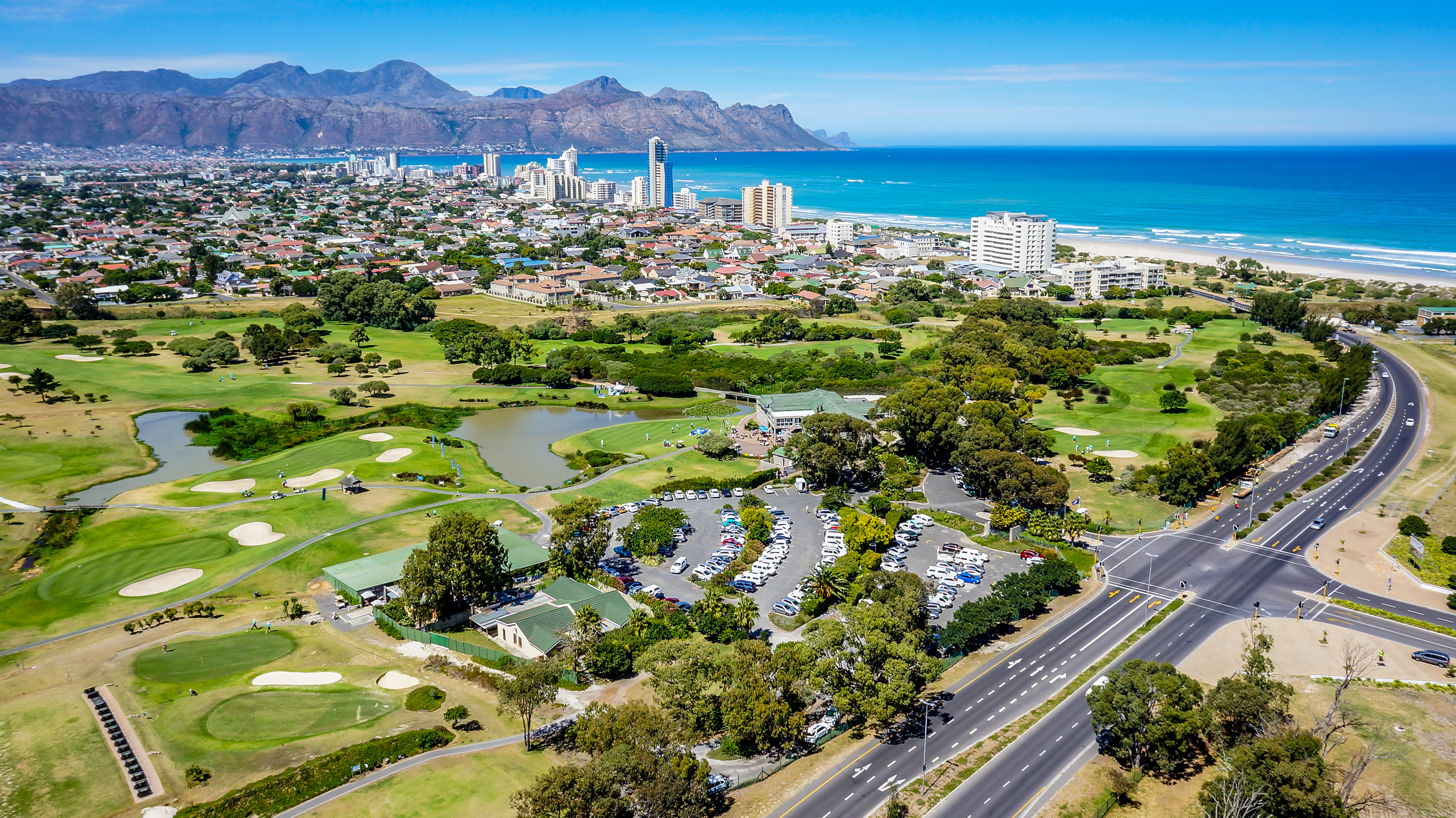
Strand, Western Cape

This is a list of seaside resorts in South Africa. These seaside resorts are in the Eastern Cape, KwaZulu-Natal, Northern Cape and Western Cape provinces which are all coastal provinces of South Africa.

== Eastern Cape ==
- Blue Horizon Bay
- Bluewater Bay
- Bushman's River Mouth
- Cannon Rocks
- Cape St Francis
- Chintsa
- Coffee Bay
- East London
- Gonubie
- Haga Haga
- Hamburg
- Jeffreys Bay
- Kenton-on-Sea
- Kidd's Beach
- Mazeppa Bay
- Morgans Bay
- Port Alfred
- Port Elizabeth
- Port St Johns
- St Francis Bay

== KwaZulu-Natal ==
=== Durban ===
- Durban

=== South Coast ===
- Amanzimtoti
- Hibberdene
- Kingsburgh
- Margate
- Pennington
- Port Edward
- Ramsgate
- Scottburgh
- Shelly Beach
- St Michael's-on-sea
- Umzumbe
- Uvongo

=== North Coast ===
- Ballito
- Blythedale Beach
- Cape Vidal
- eMdloti
- Mtunzini
- Salt Rock
- Shaka's Rock
- St Lucia
- Tinley Manor Beach
- Tugela Mouth
- uMhlanga
- Zinkwazi Beach

== Northern Cape ==
- Alexander Bay
- Hondeklip Bay
- Jacobsbaai
- Kleinzee
- Port Nolloth

== Western Cape ==
- Arniston
- Betty's Bay
- Bloubergstrand
- Boknesstrand
- Brenton-on-Sea
- Buffelsbaai
- Cape Town
- De Kelders
- Elands Bay
- Fish Hoek
- Franskraalstrand
- Gansbaai
- Gordon's Bay
- Hartenbos
- Hawston
- Hermanus
- Herolds Bay
- Keurboomstrand
- Kleinmond
- Knysna
- Kommetjie
- L'Agulhas
- Lambert's Bay
- Langebaan
- Llandudno
- Mossel Bay
- Muizenberg
- Nature's Valley
- Noordhoek
- Onrus
- Paternoster
- Pearly Beach
- Plettenberg Bay
- Pringle Bay
- Sedgefield
- Simon's Town
- St Helena Bay
- Stilbaai
- Strand
- Strandfontein
- Struisbaai
- Tergniet
- Victoria Bay
- Wilderness
- Witsand
- Yzerfontein
