= Mkhize =

Mkhize is a surname. Notable people with the surname include:

- Bertha Mkhize (1889–1981), South African teacher and businesswoman
- Emmanuel Mkhize (born 1989), South African cricketer
- Florence Mkhize (1932–1999), South African anti-apartheid activist
- Hlengiwe Mkhize (1952–2021), South African politician
- Linda Mkhize (1981–2018), South African rapper
- Nomhlangano Beauty Mkhize (1946–1977), South African activist
- Saul Mkhize (1935–1983), South African activist
- Senzo Mkhize (died 2016), South African politician
- Shauwn Mkhize, South African businesswoman and socialite
- Siphesihle Mkhize (born 1999), South African footballer
- Siphetho Mkhize, South African politician
- Thamsanqa Mkhize (born 1988), South African footballer
- Themba Mkhize, South African jazz musician
- Zweli Mkhize (born 1956), South African doctor and ANC politician
- Olwethu Mkhize (born 2002), political activist

== See also ==
- Florence Mkhize (patrol vessel), operated by South Africa
