= Margate, South Africa =

Resort town in KwaZulu-Natal, South Africa

Margate
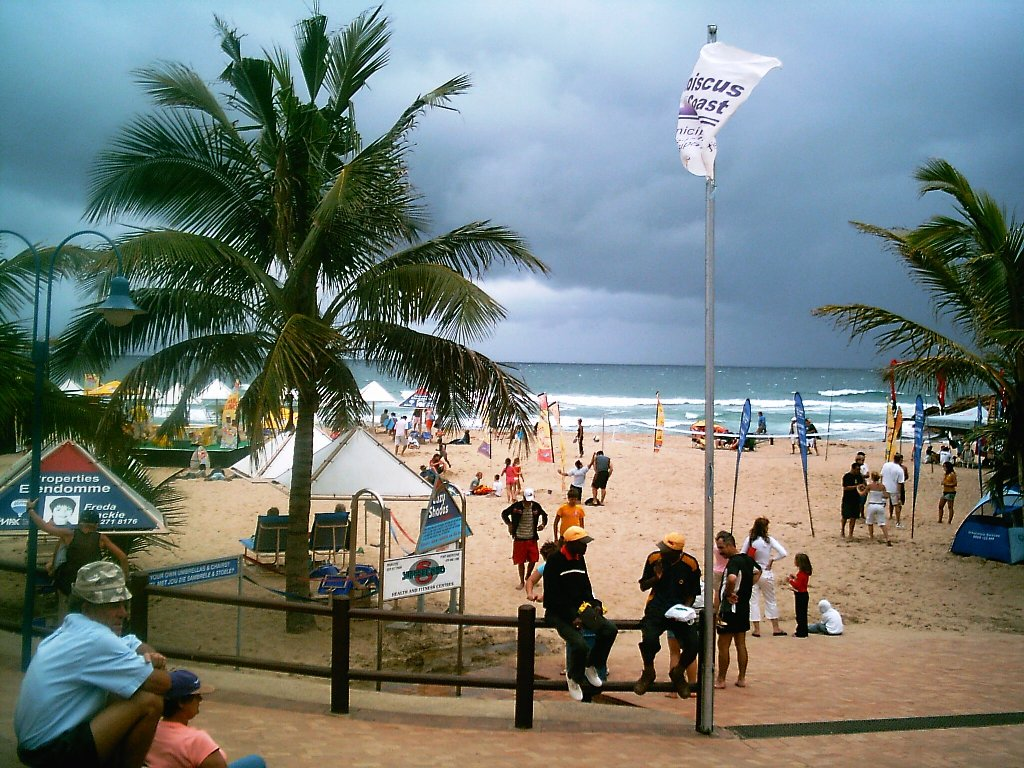
- Margate's main beach

- Location within KwaZulu-Natal Location within South Africa
- Coordinates: 30°51′00″S 30°22′00″E
- Country: South Africa
- Province: KwaZulu-Natal
- District: Ugu
- Municipality: Ray Nkonyeni

Area
  - Total: 29.21 km^{2} (11.28 sq mi)

Population (2011)
  - Total: 26,785
  - Density: 917.0/km^{2} (2,375/sq mi)

Racial makeup (2011)
  - Black African: 47.3%
  - White: 46.9%
  - Indian/Asian: 3.1%
  - Coloured: 2.2%
  - Other: 0.6%

First languages (2011)
  - English: 35.8%
  - Xhosa: 22.5%
  - Afrikaans: 19.8%
  - Zulu: 18.4%
  - Other: 3.5%
- Time zone: UTC+2 (SAST)
- Postal code (street): 4275
- PO box: 4275
- Area code: 039

Margate is a coastal resort town in the KwaZulu-Natal province, about 20 kilometres (12.4 mi) south-west of Port Shepstone and 127 kilometres (78.9 mi) south-west of Durban. The river which flows into the sea at Margate is called "Nkhongweni" (place of entreaty) as the original inhabitants of the area were reputed to be so mean resulting in travellers begging for hospitality.

Located on the Hibiscus Coast, part of the South Coast of KwaZulu-Natal, Margate is one of the major hubs for tourists who are looking to visit the eastern coastline of South Africa.

== History ==
In 1908, Henry Richardson, an English surveyor laid out the town and named it Margate after another seaside resort on the northern coast of the county of Kent, in the United Kingdom.

Margate hit the world headlines in 1922 (although this date is often disputed and stated as 1924) when an enormous, white, furry creature (dubbed "Trunko" due to it having an elephantine trunk) was washed up on the beach. The "Margate monster" was too decomposed to be identified.

== Geography ==
=== Topography ===
Margate’s terrain is relatively undulating, rising westward to its highest point at Margate Airport (152 m/499 ft). The town is bordered by Manaba Beach to the north and Ramsgate to the south, forming a continuous coastal stretch.

=== Suburbs ===
The 2011 census divided the main places of Margate into 14 “sub places” including:

- Beacon Rocks
- Lawrence Rocks
- Manaba Beach
- Margate (Proper)
  - also encompasses Margate Ext. 3 and Ext. 7, Gayridge Agricultural Holdings and the KwaMasinenge Informal Settlement
- Margate Beach
- Margate North Beach
- Ramsgate
- Ramsgate Beach
- Ramsgate South
- Shelly Beach
- St Michael's-on-sea
- Uvongo
- Uvongo Beach
- Windsor-on-Sea

== Economy ==
=== Retail ===
==== Shopping centres ====
- Emoyeni Centre: A neighbourhood centre situated adjacent to the Margate Taxi Rank near the CBD. The centre is accessible from National Road and Erasmus Road and is anchored by Checkrite and Pep.
- Hibiscus Mall: The largest shopping centre in Margate, situated on Wartski Drive within close proximity to National Road and the CBD. The community shopping centre is anchored by Checkers, Woolworths Food and Clicks.
- Margate Centre (also known Pick n Pay Centre): A convenience shopping centre situated on the corner Wartski Drive and National Road and is anchored by Pick n Pay.
- Margate Mall (also known as Shoprite Centre): A convenience shopping centre situated on Marine Drive in the CBD and is anchored by Shoprite.

For a wider variety, residents often visit Shelly Beach, home to two of the South Coast's largest malls: Shelly Centre and Southcoast Mall.

=== Tourism ===
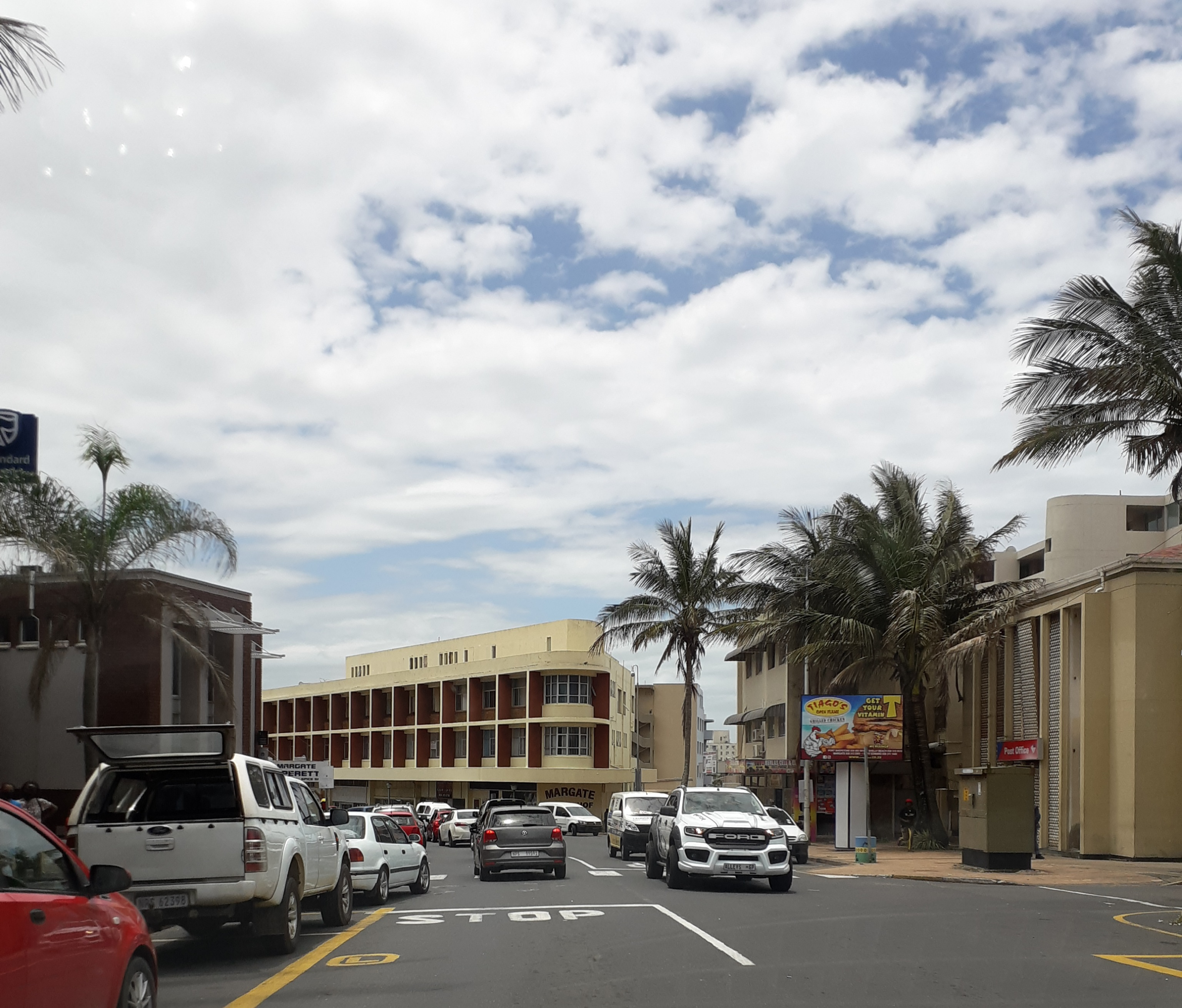
Margate Central Business District

Margate is largely a tourist town, owing to its subtropical climate, beaches, and hospitality industry with the bulk of the town's earnings coming from tourism. There is a wide range of holiday accommodation in the area including hotels such as Margate Hotel and Desroches Hotel, holiday apartments along the coast, self-contained units and holiday houses for rent.

Margate is popularly known for its good beaches, especially its main beach, which is accredited with the international Blue Flag status. The Margate Central Business District (CBD) situated between the main road, Marine Drive and the main beach is a lively area filled with many restaurants, pubs, and nightclubs.

Margate is busiest during school and public holidays when inland residents travel to the coast. Christmas and Easter are especially busy times, with Marine Drive often clogged with heavy traffic during these times.

Margate is one of the most visited tourist destinations in South Africa and had the third highest inflow of new visitors in December 2019 in South Africa after Plettenberg Bay and Mossel Bay, both in the Western Cape Province meaning that Margate had the highest inflow of new visitors in December 2019 in the KwaZulu-Natal Province.

== Education ==
=== Public Schools ===
- Hibiscus Primary School
- Margate Middle School
- Margate Primary School

=== Private Schools ===
- South Coast Academy
- Hibiscus International Academy

== Healthcare ==
=== Private healthcare ===
Established in 2001, Netcare Margate Hospital is the main healthcare facility serving the community of Margate. As part of Netcare Limited, one of South Africa’s largest private healthcare providers, it offers 24-hour emergency services. Conveniently situated on Wartski Drive, it lies just a short distance from the CBD.

=== Public healthcare ===
Margate Clinic is a government-funded municipal clinic operated by the Ugu District Municipality, located near the Margate CBD. Residents of Margate generally make use of the Port Shepstone Regional Hospital in Port Shepstone for higher-level public healthcare services.

== Transport ==
=== Air ===
Margate Airport, located in Margate Ext. 3 on the town’s western outskirts is a small, regional airport with easy and quick access. It offers a scheduled domestic route to Johannesburg operated by CemAir. For broader travel options, King Shaka International Airport near Durban is approximately 166 kilometres (103 mi) north-east of Margate.

=== Roads ===
Margate straddles the R61 freeway (future N2 Wild Coast Toll Route), which connects to Port Shepstone in the north and Port Edward in the south, with interchanges at Seaslopes Avenue and Alford Avenue. The R620 (Marine Drive; National Road) is the main road through Margate, connecting to Uvongo in the north and Ramsgate in the south. Additionally, the P200 (Izotsha Road) provides a link to Gamalakhe and Izotsha to the north-west.

== Sport ==
The Margate Country Club is an 18-hole golf course, par 71 course designed by Peter Matkovich which is set high on the western outskirts of Margate overlooking the Indian Ocean from a distance.

== Community initiatives ==
Margate is part of a community-based initiative called Tidy Towns Shelly to Margate, where local communities and businesses restore civic pride between Shelly Beach and Margate, including St Michael’s-on-Sea, Uvongo and Manaba Beach. Residents work in conjunction with the Ray Nkonyeni Local Municipality to maintain and manage local infrastructure.

== See also ==
- Black December

== See also ==
- Margate Airport
