= Umzumbe =

Seaside town in KwaZulu-Natal, South Africa

Umzumbe uMzumbe, eMzumbe
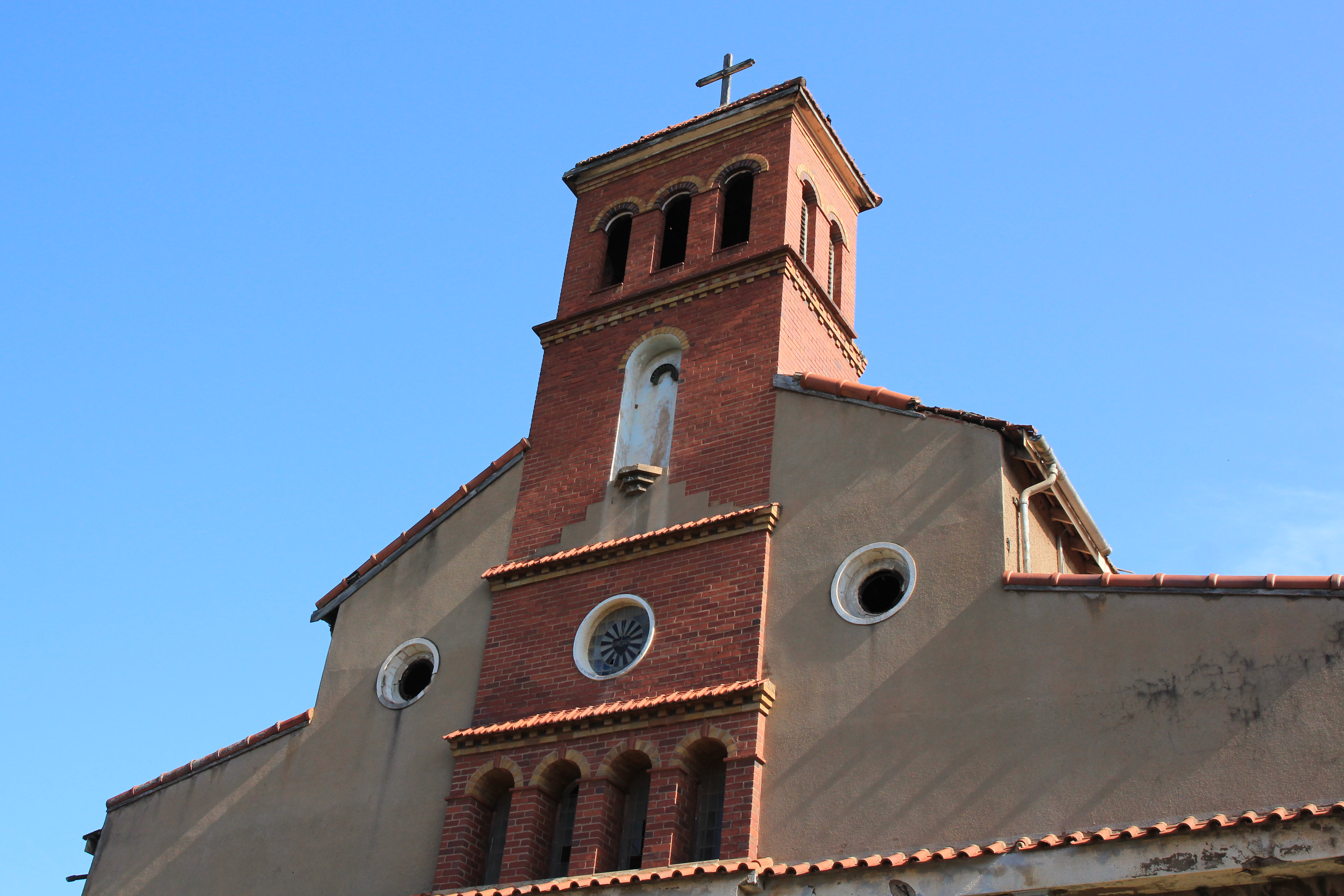
- Old St Elmos church in Umzumbe

- Location within KwaZulu-Natal Location within South Africa
- Coordinates: 30.6249°S 30.5420°E
- Country: South Africa
- Province: KwaZulu-Natal
- District: Ugu
- Municipality: Ray Nkonyeni
- Main Place: Hibberdene

Area
  - Total: 2.21 km^{2} (0.85 sq mi)

Population (2011)
  - Total: 366
  - Density: 166/km^{2} (429/sq mi)

Racial makeup (2011)
  - Black African: 40.2%
  - Coloured: 4.9%
  - Indian/Asian: 6.0%
  - White: 48.6%
  - Other: 0.3%

First languages (2011)
  - English: 42.2%
  - Zulu: 32.4%
  - Afrikaans: 22.0%
  - Xhosa: 2.0%
  - Other: 1.4%
- Time zone: UTC+2 (SAST)
- Postal code (street): 4225
- PO box: 4225
- Area code: 039

Umzumbe or uMzumbe is a seaside resort situated at the mouth of the Mzumbe River in KwaZulu-Natal, South Africa. The name of the river is derived from a band of Hlongwa cannibals who occupied the valley. The Hlongwa was almost wiped out by the Zulu king Shaka in 1828.

== Etymology ==
Umzumbe is situated south of the mouth of the Mzumbe River, from which it takes its name; of Zulu origin, it has been explained as meaning ‘the dangerous river’, ‘the winding river’ and ‘wild bean river’. The form uMzumbe has been approved.

== Geography ==
Umzumbe lies on the mouth of the uMzumbe River some 5 km (3 mi) south-west of Hibberdene and is situated just north of the coastal village of Pumula. It also lies along the R102 between Hibberdene in the north and Melville in the south, approximately 16 km (9.9 mi) north of Port Shepstone and 98 km (61 mi) south-west of Durban.

== Recreational areas ==
Umzumbe Beach, the main beach of Umzumbe, has been accredited as a Blue Flag Beach. However, there are larger beaches in the greater vicinity of the Lower South Coast are also found in Hibberdene, Ramsgate, St Michael's-on-Sea, Uvongo and Margate.

Another recreational area is the Umzumbe Surf Camp.

== Spearfishing ==
Spearfishing is popular in Umzumbe as the Umzumbe point is the most prominent tip south of Hibberdene. It is a prime area for garrick and brusher.
