= R620 (South Africa) =

Road in South Africa

Regional route R620

Route information
- Length: 24.5 km (15.2 mi)

Major junctions
- North end: R102 in Port Shepstone
- South end: R61 in Southbroom

Location
- Country: South Africa
- Towns: Port Shepstone, Shelly Beach, St Michael’s-on-Sea, Uvongo, Manaba Beach, Margate, Ramsgate, Southbroom

Highway system
- Numbered routes of South Africa
← R619	→ R621

The R620 is a regional route in KwaZulu-Natal, South Africa that connects the coastal towns of Southbroom and Port Shepstone via Ramsgate, Margate, Uvongo and Shelly Beach. It is often termed the ‘beach road’ of the Lower South Coast, considering that it mostly runs near the coastline.

It is an alternative route to the R61 Toll Highway (future N2 Wild Coast Toll Route) between Southbroom and Port Shepstone.

== Route ==
The R620 begins at an intersection with the R102 in Oslo Beach, south of Port Shepstone CBD. It begins by heading south as Marine Drive, into Oslo Beach and crosses the Zotsha Creek to enter Shelly Beach. It passes through Shelly Beach and crosses the Mhlanga River to enter St Michael’s-on-Sea and Uvongo. After passing through Uvongo, it reaches the intersection with Seaslopes Avenue, after which it enters Manaba Beach.

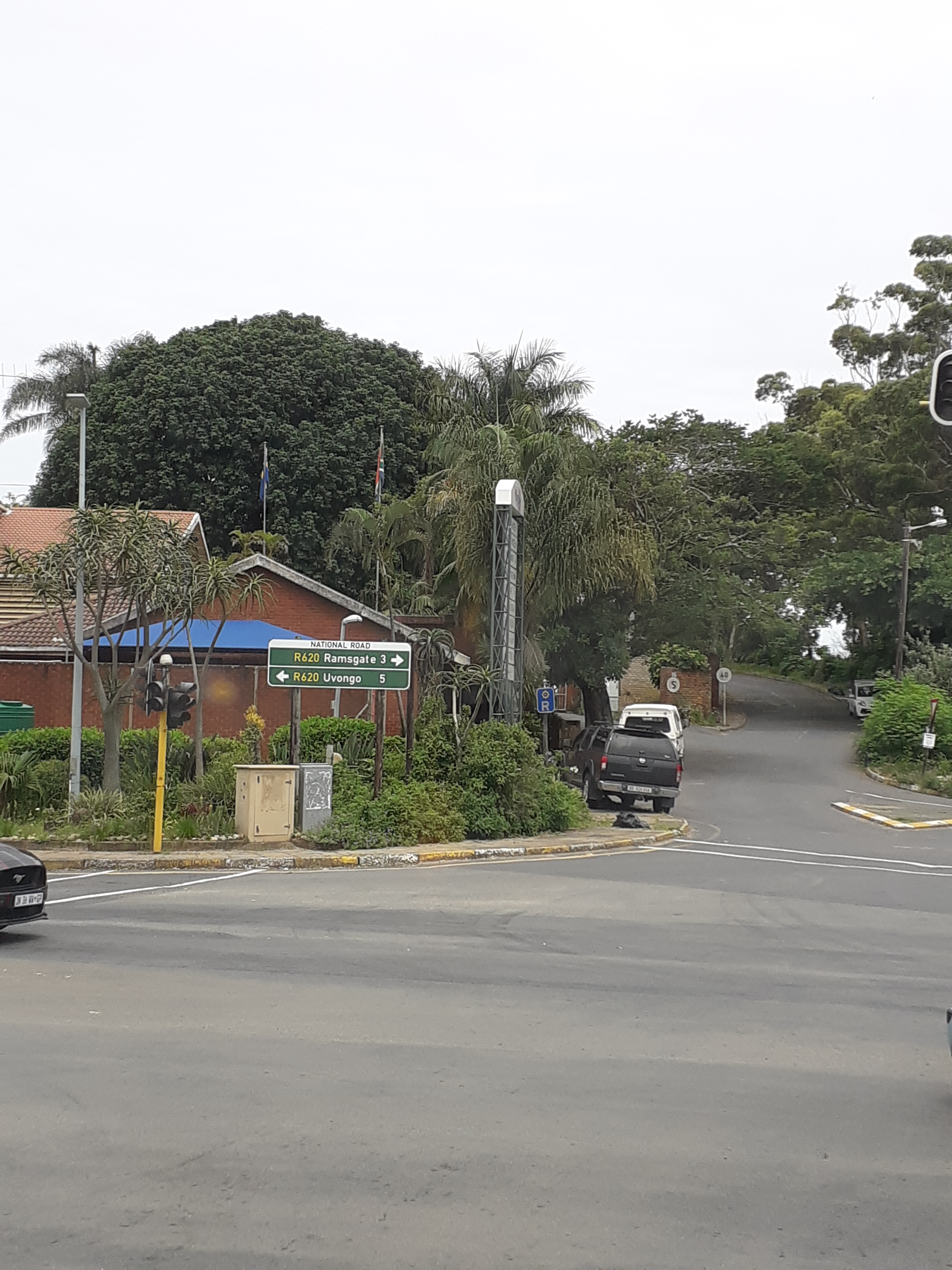
The R620 National Road in Margate

It then proceeds to descend into Margate, where it separates from Marine Drive (which heads into Margate Central) and bypasses Margate Central as National Road, before rejoining Marine Drive in the south of Margate. It then proceeds through Ramsgate and crosses under the R61, where it rounds and crosses the Mbizane River before ending shortly after at a junction with the R61 in Southbroom.
