= Margate Airport =

Margate Airport Margate Lughawe
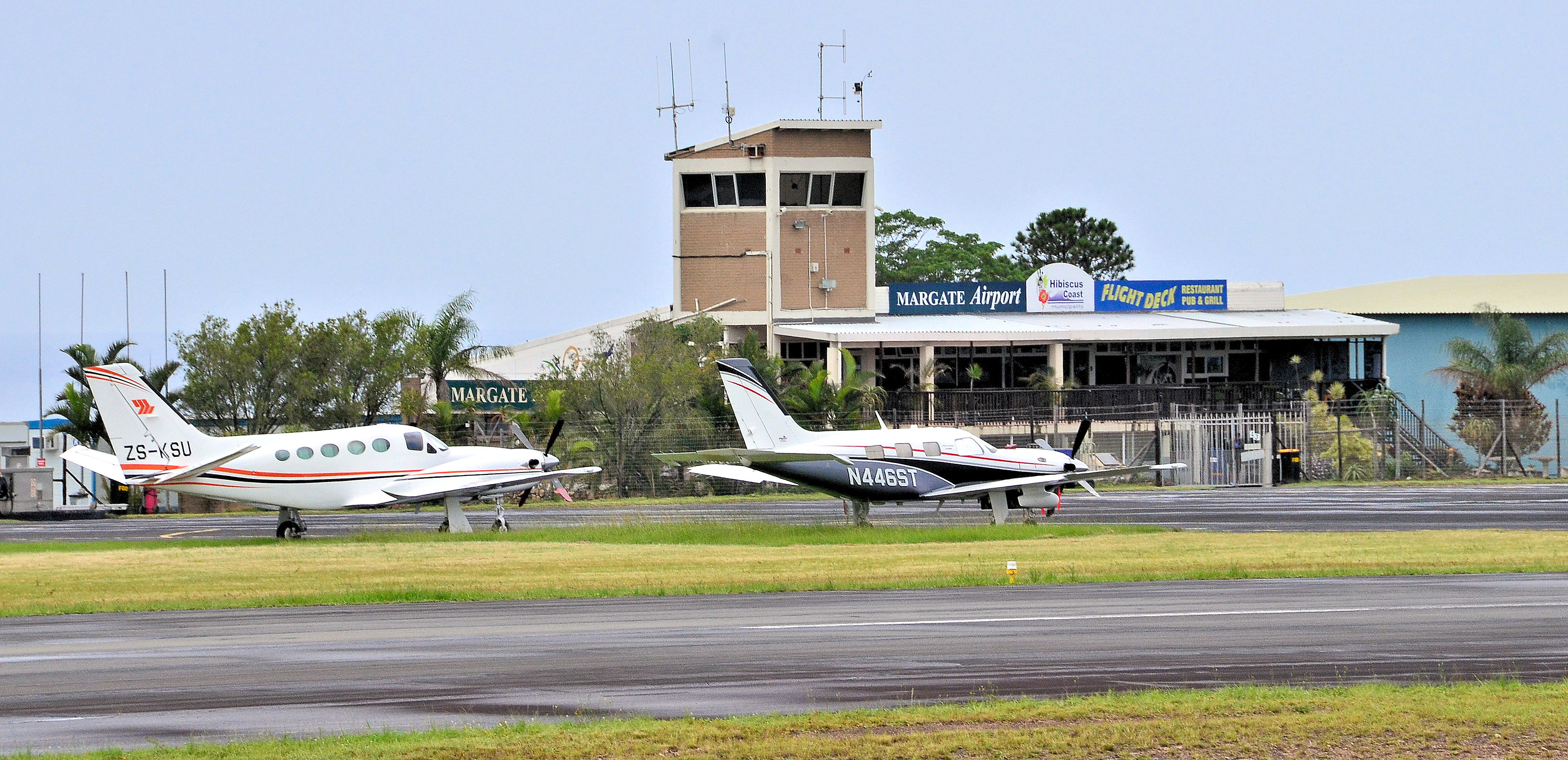
- Margate Airport
- IATA: MGH; ICAO: FAMG

Summary
- Airport type: Public
- Operator: Ray Nkonyeni Local Municipality
- Serves: Margate
- Location: Margate, Ugu District Municipality, South Africa
- Elevation AMSL: 498 ft / 152 m
- Coordinates: 30°51′34″S 30°20′35″E
- Website: www.flymargate.com

Map
- Location in KwaZulu-Natal

Runways
Direction	Length		Surface
Direction	ft	m	Surface
04/22	4,495	1,370	Asphalt

Margate Airport is an airport in Margate, KwaZulu-Natal, South Africa (IATA: MGH, ICAO: FAMG). The airport serves as a lower passenger volume alternative to King Shaka International Airport in Durban.

It only has one schedule flight service which is to O. R. Tambo International Airport in Johannesberg route provided by CemAir. The airport also has charter flights, scenic flips and microlight flips.

== Upgrade ==
In 2020, a R 10,000,000 upgrade to Margate Airport was funded by the Department of Economic Development, Tourism and Environmental Affairs. The upgrade which began in June 2020, included expanding the arrivals terminal, refurbishing ablution facilities, the addition of a new building for car rental and the construction of a controlled paid parking area. The project was expected to finish in December 2020 however it has not been completed but was being finalized in February 2021. Due to abnormal rainfall over the summer period, construction work was temporarily halted however the upgrade is expected to be finished in July 2021.

== Airlines and destinations ==
Airlines	Destinations
CemAir	Johannesburg–O.R. Tambo

== Aviation ==
- Non-directional beacon - UR485.0
- Pilot Controlled Lighting - 7 clicks on 122.7
- Flight School and Training - Zero Four Air School - www.flymargate.com
- Fuel and Oil types available - Avgas 100LL, Jet A1, Oil - W100 Exxon

== See also ==
- Margate
