= Shelly Beach, South Africa =

Shelly Beach
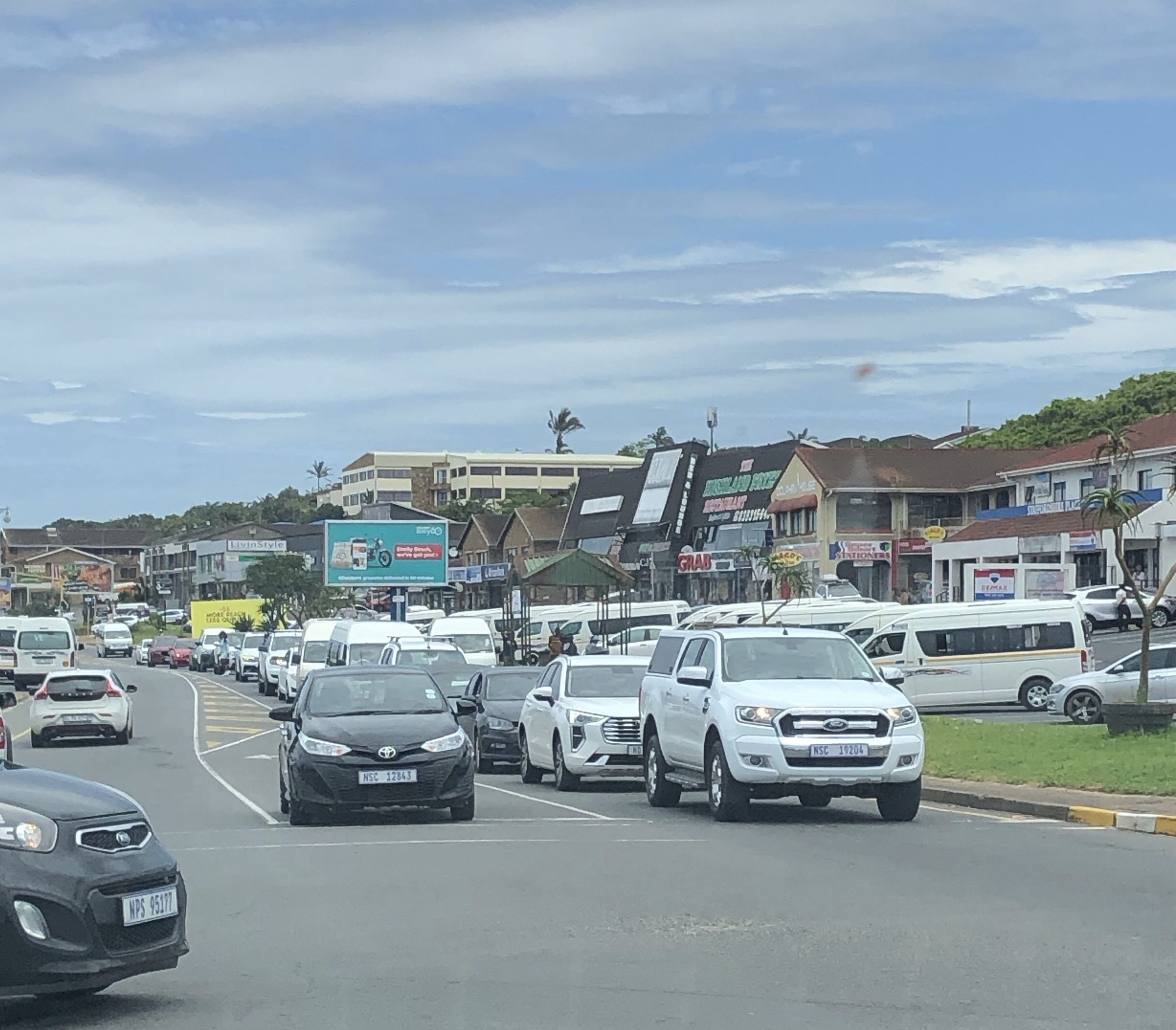
- Shelly Beach CBD

- Location within KwaZulu-Natal Location within South Africa
- Coordinates: 30.798°S 30.410°E
- Country: South Africa
- Province: KwaZulu-Natal
- District: Ugu
- Municipality: Ray Nkonyeni
- Main Place: Margate

Area
  - Total: 5.37 km^{2} (2.07 sq mi)

Population (2011)
  - Total: 2,577
  - Density: 480/km^{2} (1,240/sq mi)

Racial makeup (2011)
  - Black African: 29.3%
  - Coloured: 1.9%
  - Indian/Asian: 8.5%
  - White: 60.1%
  - Other: 0.2%

First languages (2011)
  - English: 51.8%
  - Afrikaans: 21.8%
  - Zulu: 17.0%
  - Xhosa: 6.0%
  - Other: 3.5%
- Time zone: UTC+2 (SAST)
- Postal code (street): 4265
- PO box: 4265

Shelly Beach is a coastal resort town on the South Coast of the KwaZulu-Natal province of South Africa, located approximately halfway between Margate (8.5 km) and Port Shepstone (7.1 km).

== Community initiatives ==
Shelly Beach is part of a community-based initiative called Tidy Towns Shelly to Margate, where local communities and businesses restore civic pride between Shelly Beach and Margate, including St Michael’s-on-Sea, Uvongo and Manaba Beach. Residents work in conjunction with the Ray Nkonyeni Local Municipality to maintain and manage local infrastructure.

== Geography ==
Shelly Beach is situated between the Zotsha Creek to the north, the Mhlangeni River to the south and the R61 to the west. Its neighbouring areas are Oslo Beach to the north and St Michael’s-on-Sea and Uvongo to the south.

== Economy ==
=== Economic Development ===
The opening of Shelly Centre in 1985 placed Shelly Beach as a prime shopping destination on the KZN South Coast followed by the developments of Southcoast Mall in 2005, Shelly Beach Business Park in 2007, the Shelly Beach Day Hospital (now a 24-hour hospital) in August 2010 and the reopening of McDonald's in Shelly Beach in 2021 since the 1990s. Today Shelly Beach has become the gateway to shopping on the Lower South Coast, host to the two largest malls in the region, namely Shelly Centre and Southcoast Mall.

=== Retail ===
The main retail thoroughfare in the town, Marine Drive, is the location of several local shops, car dealerships, restaurants, and shopping centres. Shopping centres in Shelly Centre include Shelly Centre, which is the largest shopping centre on the South Coast, Shelly Boulevard and Southcoast Mall, which is the second largest shopping centre on the South Coast. The latter is not located on Marine Drive, but on the border of Shelly Beach, at the intersection between the R61 and Izotsha Road.

== Tourism ==
=== Beaches ===
Shelly Beach is host to two beaches along its coastline, namely Shelly Beach and Windsor on Sea Beach.

The name "Shelly Beach" refers to the many shells on the beaches in which there are. Here, the finest miniature pink lady shells can be found among many other varieties.

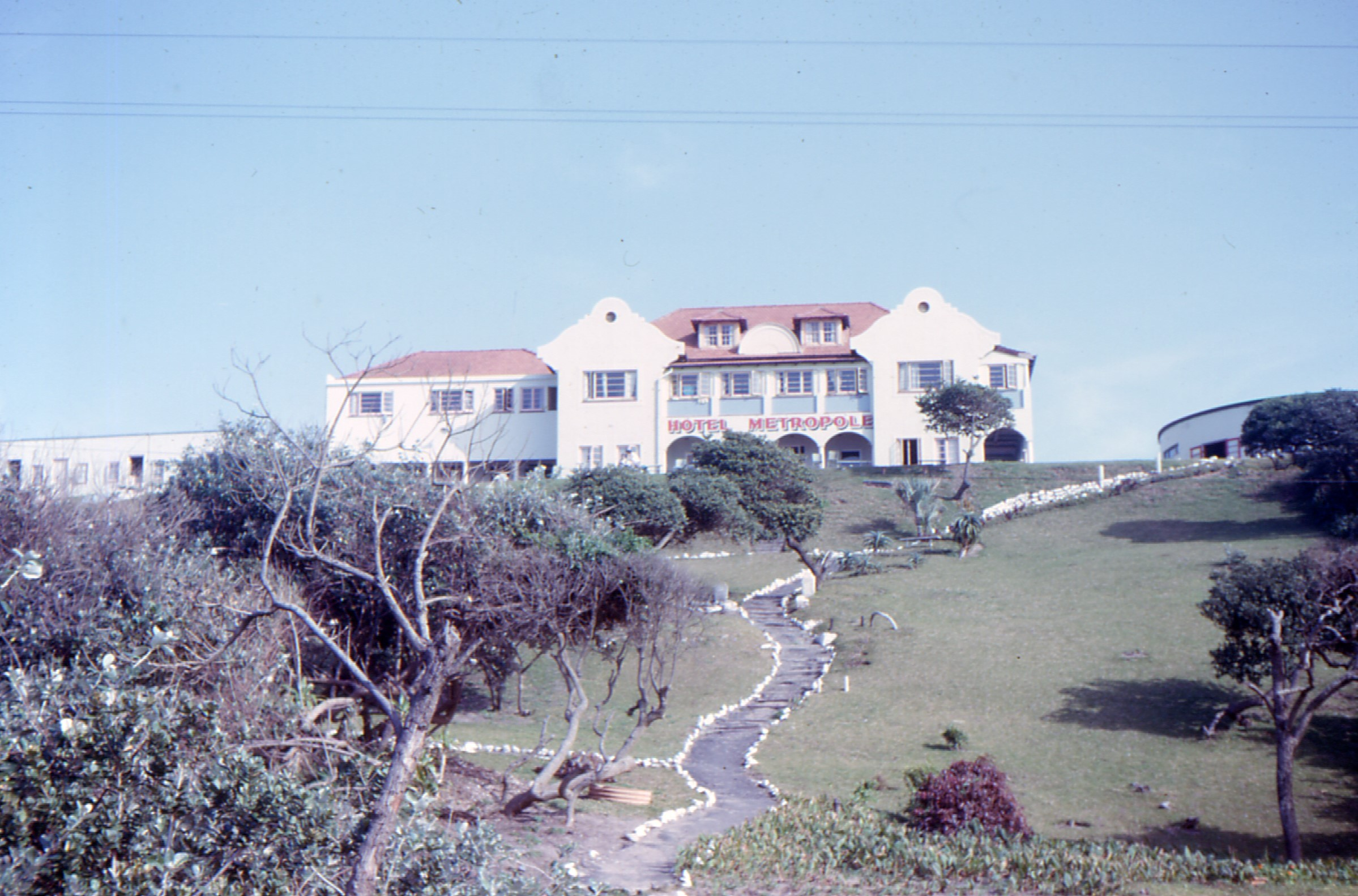
Hotel Metropole 1961

=== Snorkelling & diving ===
Shelly Beach has several diving and snorkelling sites, where tropical fish, sharks, corals and underwater caves can be seen. These include Potato Reef, The Caves, Deep Salmon, Arena Reef, Bo Boyi Reef, and Adda Reef.

== Infrastructure ==
=== Healthcare ===
==== Private healthcare ====
Established in August 2010 as the Shelly Beach Day Hospital, the Shelly Beach Hospital is the sole hospital serving Shelly Beach. Owned by Shelly Health Consortium (Pty) Ltd, it is a private hospital operating 24-hour emergency services. The hospital is located on Izotsha Road, opposite Southcoast Mall.

==== Public healthcare ====
Shelly Beach Clinic is a government-funded municipal clinic operated by the Ugu District Municipality. For public hospitals, residents of Shelly Beach normally use the Port Shepstone Regional Hospital.

=== Roads ===
Shelly Beach straddles along the R620 (Marine Drive) connecting Port Shepstone to the north with Uvongo to the south. Just a short distance inland, the north–south R61 freeway (future N2 Wild Coast Toll Route) connects Port Shepstone with Port Edward, with an interchange at Izotsha Road. Additionally, the P55 (Izotsha Road) provides a link with Izotsha to the north-west and Gamalakhe to the west (via the P200).

==== Tolling ====
The R61, forming part of the South Coast Toll Route, involves the payment of toll at the toll booths of the Izotsha Ramp Toll Plaza, situated on the off and on-ramps of the Izotsha Road interchange (Exit 39). Traffic arriving from the south to turn off at exit 39 and traffic joining the R61 S from Izotsha Road must pass through the respective ramp plazas. The R620 to Margate and Port Shepstone serves as the untolled alternative route to the R61.
