= CemAir =

Airline in South Africa

IATA	ICAO	Call sign
5Z	KEM	CEMAIR
- Founded: 2005; 21 years ago
- Hubs: O. R. Tambo International Airport
- Secondary hubs: Cape Town International Airport
- Focus cities: Johannesburg, Gauteng, South Africa
- Frequent-flyer program: SkyRewards
- Fleet size: 35+ (2026)
- Destinations: 15, across South Africa, Botswana, and Zimbabwe (2026)
- Headquarters: Kempton Park, Gauteng, South Africa
- Key people: Miles van der Molen (CEO)
- Website: cemair.co.za

CemAir is a South African airline headquartered in Johannesburg. Founded in 2005, the airline operates scheduled domestic flights across South Africa as well as regional services within Africa.

CemAir’s network includes key business and leisure destinations, and the airline is known for serving several smaller or underserved airports. As of September 2026, CemAir flies to 15 destinations, including 11 in South Africa, 2 in Botswana, and 2 in Zimbabwe.

In addition to its scheduled operations, CemAir provides aircraft leasing, charter services, and ACMI (Aircraft, Crew, Maintenance, and Insurance) solutions to other carriers.

The airline operates a fleet of over 35 aircraft that includes Bombardier CRJ, Beechcraft 1900, and De Havilland Dash 8 models, offering full-service amenities such as checked baggage and onboard catering. Over the years, CemAir has expanded its route network and service offering, positioning itself as a growing independent carrier in the Southern African and kenya aviation market.

== History ==
The company was formed in 2005 with the purpose of operating turboprop commuter aircraft, with the initial fleet consisting of 1 Cessna Grand Caravan aircraft and 3 Beechcraft 1900C aircraft.

In January 2018, the South African Civil Aviation Authority (CAA) withdrew the Certificate of Airworthiness for 12 of CemAir's aircraft, due to allegedly unqualified personnel certifying the aircraft as airworthy. It was subsequently forced by the authorities to suspend operations in late 2018.

The airline successfully launched a High Court challenge, and the grounding was overturned. The CAA then again grounded the Airline in January 2019 and CemAir challenged the decision before the Civil Aviation Appeal Committee. On 29 April 2019, the CAAC issued a judgement in favour of the airline, calling the CAA's actions "irrational, arbitrary, unreasonable and procedurally unfair" and "factually wrong."

In January 2021, CemAir signed an interline agreement with Ethiopian Airlines.

CemAir now has interline agreements with Emirates, British Airways, Qatar Airways, Turkish Airlines, Air France, KLM, Egypt Air, Proflight, LAM, Kenya Airways and Air Europa.

CemAir has a codeshare agreement with South African Airways.

== Operations ==
CemAir's hub in Johannesburg features a 1,800 sqm hangar, offices, and a 2,000 sqm private apron, for managing flight operations, maintenance (performed in-house), and administration.

== Destinations ==
=== Charter operations ===
Based at OR Tambo International Airport, South Africa, a significant portion of the fleet is deployed outside the country, including in the Caribbean and West Africa.

=== Scheduled destinations ===
Most (10) of CemAir's 15 destinations are in South Africa, with 4 of them located elsewhere in Southern Africa. As of September 2026, CemAir operates flights to the following destinations:

==== Domestic (South Africa) ====
- Bloemfontein - Bram Fischer International Airport
- Cape Town - Cape Town International Airport
- Durban - King Shaka International Airport
- East London - King Phalo Airport
- George - George Airport
- Gqeberha - Chief Dawid Stuurman International Airport
- Hoedspruit - Eastgate Airport
- Johannesburg - O. R. Tambo International Airport (Hub)
- Kimberley - Kimberley Airport
- Richards Bay - Richards Bay Airport (as of 1 Nov 2026)
- Margate - Margate Airport

==== International ====
- Harare, Zimbabwe - Robert Gabriel Mugabe International Airport
- Kasane, Botswana - Kasane Airport
- Maun, Botswana - Maun Airport
- Victoria Falls, Zimbabwe - Victoria Falls Airport

== Fleet ==
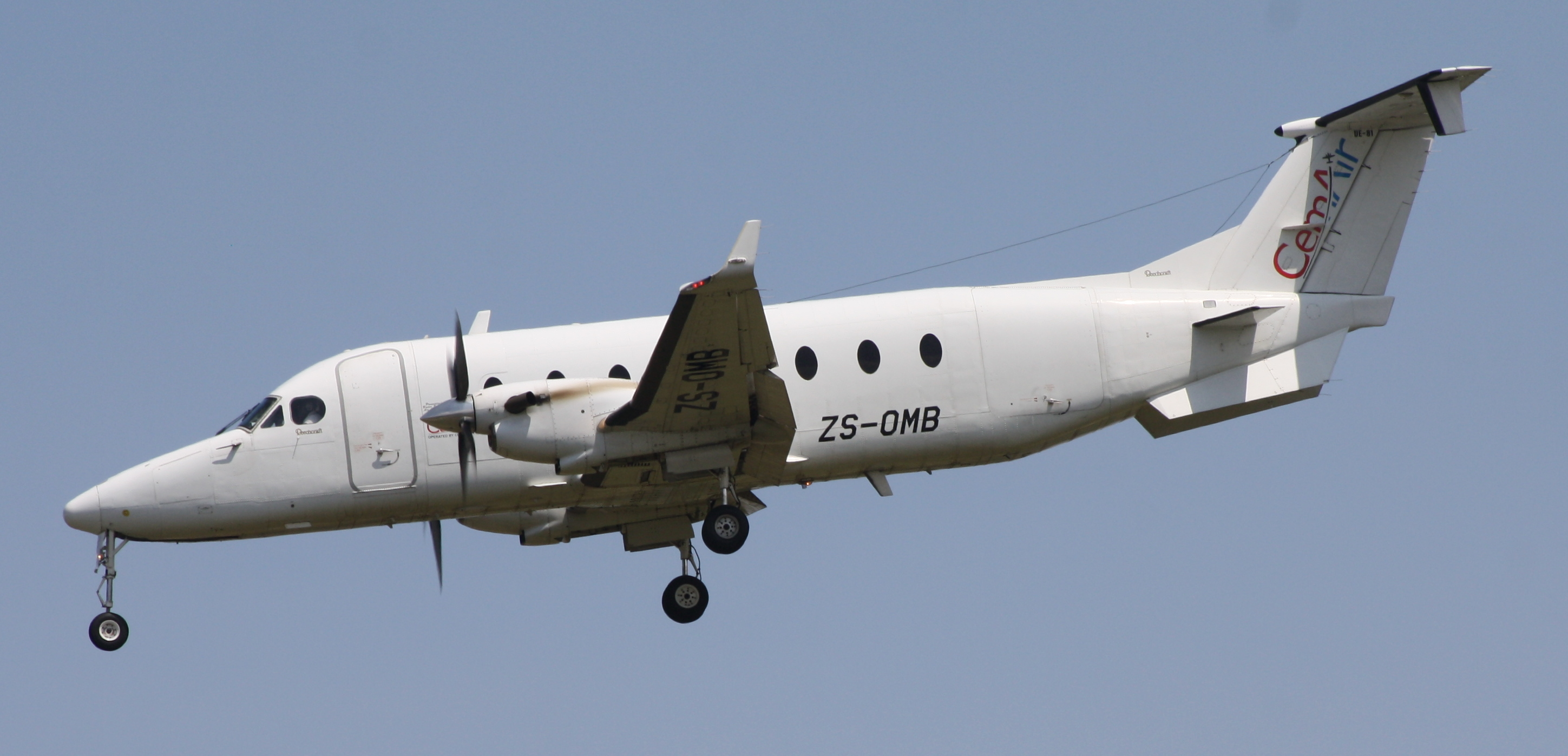
CemAir Beechcraft 1900D

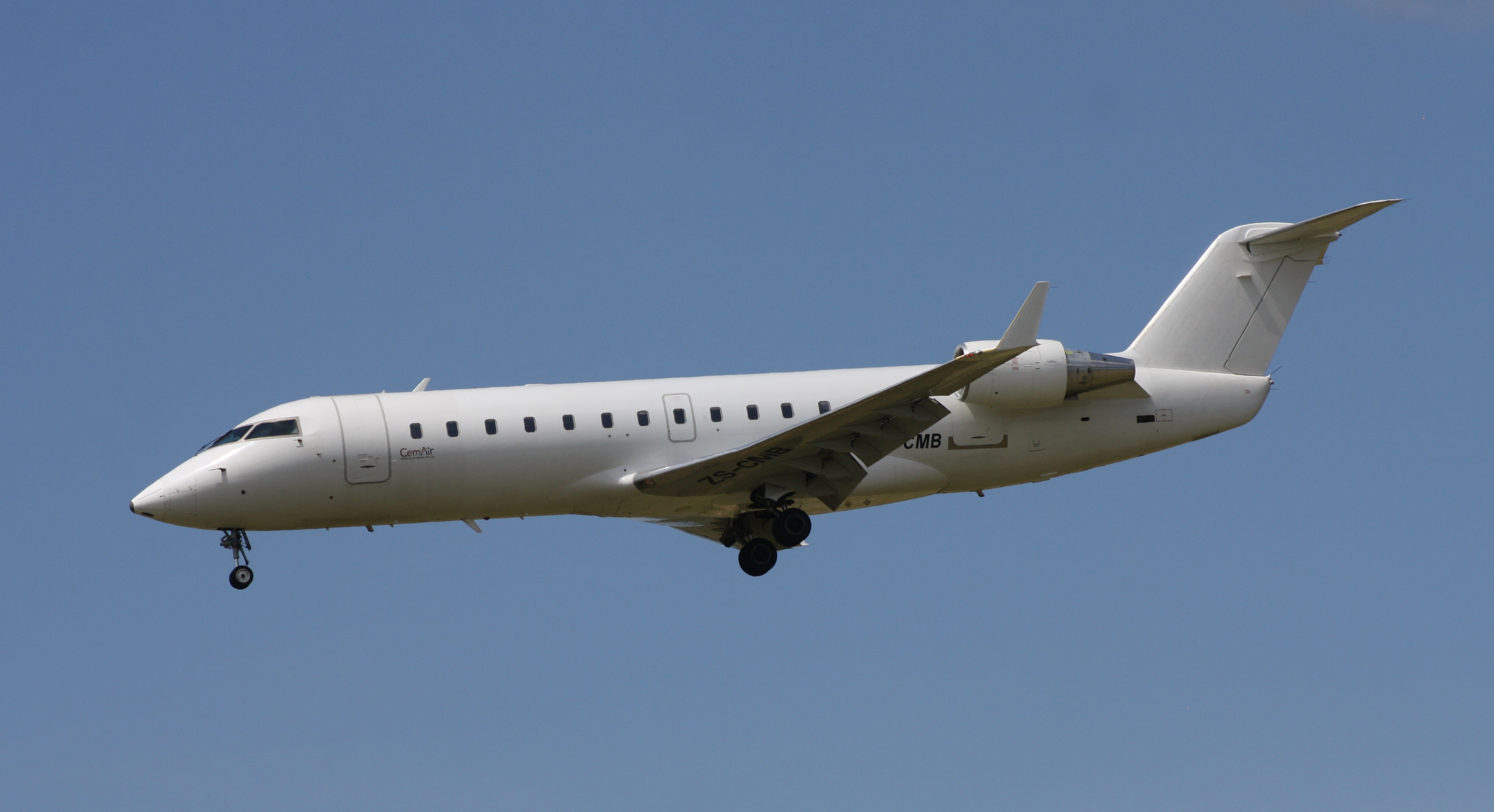
CemAir Bombardier CRJ200

As of September 2026, CemAir operates the following aircraft:

Aircraft	In fleet	Orders	Passengers	Notes
Beechcraft 1900D	5	—	19	
Bombardier CRJ100/CRJ200	11	—	50	
Bombardier CRJ700	3	—	70	
Bombardier CRJ900	9	—	90	
De Havilland Canada Dash 8-100	1	—	37	
De Havilland Canada Dash 8 Q300	3	—	50	
De Havilland Canada Dash 8 Q400	4	—	78	
Total	36	—		

== Accidents and incidents ==
CemAir suffered two hull losses in 2008 with aircraft leased out to 3rd parties, one in South Sudan and the other in the Democratic Republic of the Congo.

- On 2 May 2008, a CemAir-owned Beechcraft 1900 - registered in Kenya and operated by Kenyan-based Flex Air Cargo - was flying from Wau to Juba, South Sudan when it crashed near Rumbek, killing all nineteen passengers and two crew. Among the passengers were two senior officials of the Sudan People's Liberation Army and their wives.
- On 1 September 2008, an Air Serv-leased nineteen passenger Beechcraft 1900C crashed in the Democratic Republic of the Congo, about 15 km northwest of Bukavu carrying two crew and fifteen passengers. The aircraft was wet leased at the time and flown by crew from CemAir, which was then based at Lanseria International Airport, Johannesburg, South Africa. The flight was arriving at Bukavu following technical service at N'Dolo Airport, Kinshasa. The aircraft crashed into a mountainous ridge. Passengers included twelve Congolese, one French, one Indian, and one Canadian. All 17 occupants were killed.
