= Nomhlangano Beauty Mkhize =

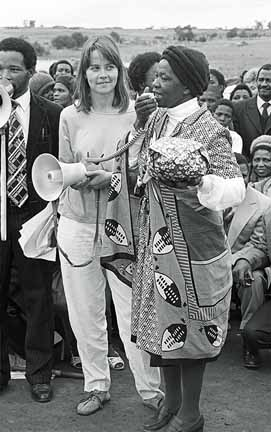
- Nomhlangano Beauty Mkhize thanking Aninka Claasens, TRAC & Black Sash for their support to build the clinic, built at Driefontein, to show the residents defiance of moving from their land.
- Born: 12 April 1940 (age 85); Sophiatown, South Africa
- Occupation: Anti-apartheid activist
- Organization(s): Rural Women's Movement, Black Sash
- Spouse: Saul Mkhize

Nomhlangano Beauty Mkhize OLB (12 April 1940) is South African activist, politician, shop steward and wife to late Saul Mkhize. She was born in Sophiatown and she was forcibly removed to Meadowlands in Soweto and that's where she met her husband.

== Early years ==
Mkhize grew up under the apartheid era, where she resided in Driefontein, Mpumalanga.

== Career ==
She and her husband led the struggle against forced removals in Driefontein.
