= Southcoast Mall =

Shopping centre in Shelly Beach, South Africa

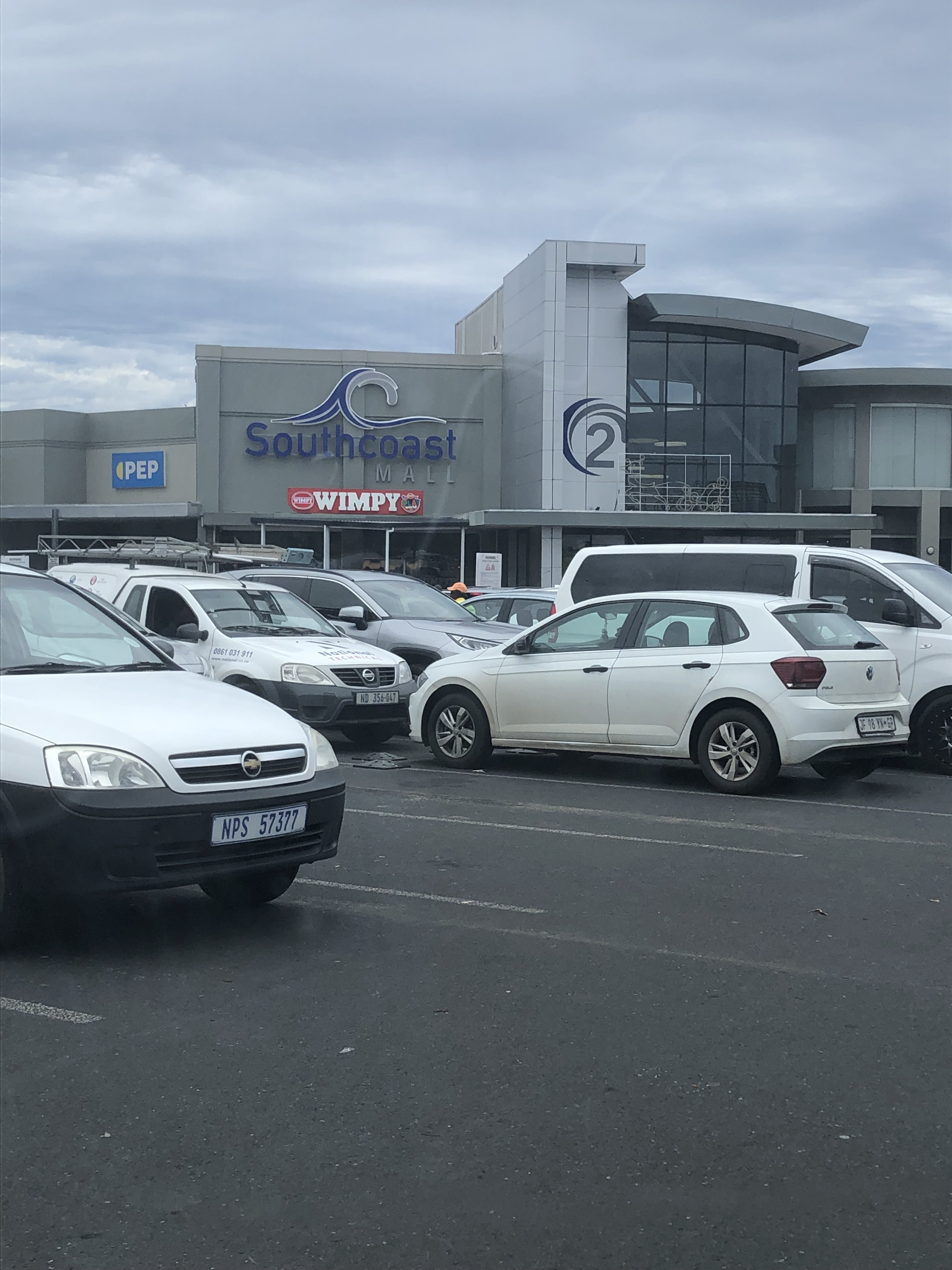
- Entrance 2 of Southcoast Mall
- Interactive map of the Southcoast Mall area

General information
- Location: Shelly Beach, KwaZulu-Natal (Ugu District Municipality), South Africa, Izotsha Road, Shelly Beach, Margate, 4265
- Coordinates: 30.7977°S 30.4057°E
- Opening: November 2005
- Renovated: June 2014
- Cost: R196 million
- Owner: Redefine Properties

Technical details
- Floor count: 2
- Floor area: 37,000 m^{2} (400,000 sq ft)

Design and construction
- Main contractor: Grinaker-LTA

Renovating team
- Architect: Millenium Consortium Architects

Other information
- Number of stores: 67 stores

Website
- southcoastmall.co.za

Southcoast Mall is a shopping centre located in Shelly Beach on the South Coast of KwaZulu-Natal, South Africa. It is the second largest shopping centre on the South Coast after Shelly Centre, mainly serving the Lower South Coast region.

== History ==
Southcoast Mall was a joint development by Hyprop Investments Limited and Redefine Income Fund Limited/Redefine Properties at a cost of approximately R195m and opened in November 2005.

In 2011, Hyprop Investment and Redefine Properties had decided to sell Southcoast Mall and to focus on core assets mainly in Gauteng where they are based. Hyprop Investment sold its 50% stake in the shopping centre however Redefine Properties later decided to retain its ownership of the shopping centre.

In 2014, the Southcoast Mall undergone a substantial reconfiguration which would occur in three phases, which will run successively one after the other.

Phase 1 of the development saw the construction of new premises to house Galaxy Bingo, a premier gaming facility which is currently near the middle entrance to the centre, the relocation of Ramsgate Stationers, to new premises within the centre and the commencement of the new Mr Price Sport and Food Lover's Market stores.

After the completion of phase 1, the two adjacent entrances were revamped during phases 2 and as well as the food court and toilet facilities.

In 2018, Southcoast Mall was voted as the “Best Of South Coast” in the shopping centre category at the South Coast Herald Readers’ Choice Awards. This was the first time the mall had won the accolade.

== Location ==
Southcoast Mall is located on the outskirts of Shelly Beach, on the corner of Izotsha Road heading north-west from Shelly Beach to Izotsha and the R61 freeway (future N2 Wild Coast Toll Road) heading south from Port Shepstone to Port Edward. It also has direct access to the R61 at exit 39.

== Tenants ==
Southcoast Mall has over 75 stores with anchor tenants of the mall including:

- Builders Express
- Checkers
- Dis-Chem
- Food Lover's Market
- House & Home
- Game

Southcoast Mall is centered on a large internal central walkway, with anchor tenants at either end and line shops running along the length of the mall.
