= Manaba Beach =

- Location within KwaZulu-Natal Location within South Africa
- Coordinates: 30°50′S 30°23′E
- Country: South Africa
- Province: KwaZulu-Natal
- District: Ugu
- Municipality: Ray Nkonyeni
- Main Place: Margate

Area
  - Total: 0.81 km^{2} (0.31 sq mi)

Population (2011)
  - Total: 372
  - Density: 460/km^{2} (1,200/sq mi)

Racial makeup (2011)
  - Black African: 11.6%
  - Coloured: 3.8%
  - Indian/Asian: 0.8%
  - White: 83.5%
  - Other: 0.3%

First languages (2011)
  - Afrikaans: 51.0%
  - English: 41.5%
  - Zulu: 3.6%
  - Other: 3.9%
- Time zone: UTC+2 (SAST)
- Postal code (street): 4276
- PO box: 4276

Manaba Beach is a small coastal town on the South Coast of the KwaZulu-Natal province of South Africa, located approximately 2 kilometres (1.2 mi) north of the Margate CBD and 13 kilometres (8.1 mi) south of Port Shepstone. The name ‘Manaba’ translates to 'ease and relaxation' in the Zulu language.

== Geography ==
Forming part of the adjacent coastal town of Margate, Manaba Beach is nestled between Margate North Beach to the south and Uvongo to the north. The coastline along Manaba Beach is generally rocky and is therefore not popular amongst tourists who wish to swim or bathe in the ocean.

== Economy ==
Manaba Beach functions as a small economic hub on the South Coast of KwaZulu-Natal, with retail stores, hardware stores, and motor repair centres lining Marine Drive. A notable employer in the area is Albany, one of South Africa's largest bread producers, with a bakery on Marine Drive. Despite its commercial and residential nature, Manaba Beach is also a seaside resort with numerous self-catering holiday flats along the shore.

== Beaches ==
Lucien Beach and Manaba Beach are the two main beaches in the Manaba Beach area, both offering safe swimming and coastal attractions. Lucien Beach, a Blue Flag beach, sits at the northern end of Margate Main Beach, while Manaba Beach, further north, is protected by lifeguards and shark nets. Natural rock pools are scattered along the rocky stretch between them, adding to the area's appeal. With Margate Main Beach just south of Lucien Beach, residents and visitors have easy access to a variety of beachfront options.

== Transport ==
Manaba Beach is bisected by the R620 (Marine Drive) connecting Uvongo to the north with Margate to the south. The area is also reached via Seaslopes Avenue, which provides access to the R61 freeway (to Port Shepstone and Port Edward) and Izotsha Road (to Gamalakhe and Ramsgate) to the west.
