= Florence Mkhize =

Anti-apartheid activist

- Born: 1932; Natal, South Africa
- Died: July 10, 1999 (aged 66–67)
- Other names: Mam Flo
- Known for: anti-apartheid activist
- Spouse: Amos Mswane
- Children: 4

Florence Grace Mkhize (1932 – July 10, 1999) was an anti-apartheid activist and women's movement leader. Mkhize was usually called 'Mam Flo'. Mkhize was also involved in trade unions in South Africa, organizing for the South African Congress of Trade Unions (SACTU). From her teenage years, determined to be part of the solution of the apartheid, she joined the African National Congress (ANC). By the age of 20, Mkhize was already a full fledged activist.

== Biography ==
Mkhize was born in 1932 in Umzumbe, Natal South Coast. She started to become aware about politics at age 16 while attending a Roman Catholic school on the South Coast. Mkhize began fighting apartheid and took part in the Defiance Campaign in 1952. A photo of her burning her passbook was taken by Ranjith Kally and is now exhibited as both art and a record of that struggle. She was subsequently banned. Despite the ban on her political activity, she used her place of work, a sewing factory which placed on Lakhani Chamber, Durban, to communicate and organise. During formulation of Freedom Charter, her bus which on the way to Kliptown for Congress of People was turned back by the police and sent back to Natal. In 1954, Mkhize with Lilian Ngoyi, Helen Joseph, Fatima Meer and other women became the founding members of the Federation of South African Women. Mkhize organized women to participate in the Women's March in 1956, but was not able to go herself when the bus she was traveling on to reach Pretoria was turned back by police. She was one of thel leader from the Potato and Tobacco boycotts against industries which was colluding with apartheid in 1959. After African National Congress (ANC) was banned in 1960, as a member of South African Communist Party (SACP), she continue the struggle by joining South African Congress of Trade Unions (SACTU) until the organization suppressed by the government. In June 1968, she was banned again for five years under the Suppression of Communism Act.

In the 1970s, Mkhize was involved with the Release Mandela Campaign and used her home to hide others from security forces. During the 1980s, she was pursuing to solve education and housing crisis in Lamontville. Mkhize helped raise money to help educate students who were refused education in public school because of their parents' political involvement by going to Amsterdam. Phambili High School was founded after this trip. She was also one of the founding members of United Democratic Front (UDF) in 1983 and in the same year, she was mobilizing women from other racial groups with Natal Organization of Women.

In the 1994 elections, she became a councillor for ward 75, which she held until 7 July 1999. She founded Zikhulise Cleaning, Maintenance and Transport company when she was a councillor in eThekwini on 1997. A building was named after her in eThekwini where revenue services are made available to customers around the city. The name of the building is Florence Mkhize Building (FMB).

== Personal life ==
She married her husband, Amos Mos Mtuno, in the 1950s and lived in Durban. They had four children: Her boys named Mandla and Thulani Khosi and her daughter Shauwn Mkhize.

== Death and legacy ==
She died of congestive heart (cardiac) failure on 10 July 1999.

In 1998 the African National Congress (ANC) Women's League awarded her their bravery medal. In 1999 Nelson Mandela awarded her the South African Military Gold Medal. Durban's city centre municipal offices were renamed in her honor. In 2006 the South African Ministry of the Environment commissioned an environmental protection vessel, the Florence Mkhize.

== See also ==
- List of people subject to banning orders under apartheid
