= Driefontein, Mpumalanga =

Driefontein
- Location within Mpumalanga Location within South Africa
- Coordinates: 27°10′23″S 30°24′7″E
- Country: South Africa
- Province: Mpumalanga
- District: Gert Sibande
- Municipality: Mkhondo

Area
  - Total: 53.65 km^{2} (20.71 sq mi)

Population (2001)
  - Total: 15,319
  - Density: 285.5/km^{2} (739.5/sq mi)

Racial makeup (2001)
  - Black African: 99.8%
  - Coloured: 0.1%
  - Indian/Asian: 0.1%

First languages (2001)
  - Zulu: 94.5%
  - Swazi: 4.6%
- Time zone: UTC+2 (SAST)
- PO box: 3379

Driefontein (Afrikaans for "Three-fountain"), also known as Saul Mkhizeville, is a village in Gert Sibande District Municipality in the Mpumalanga province of South Africa. It has changed its name to Mkhizeville after Saul Mkhize, who was shot and killed by the apartheid police for organising a peaceful march against forceful removals.
