= Florence Mkhize (patrol vessel) =

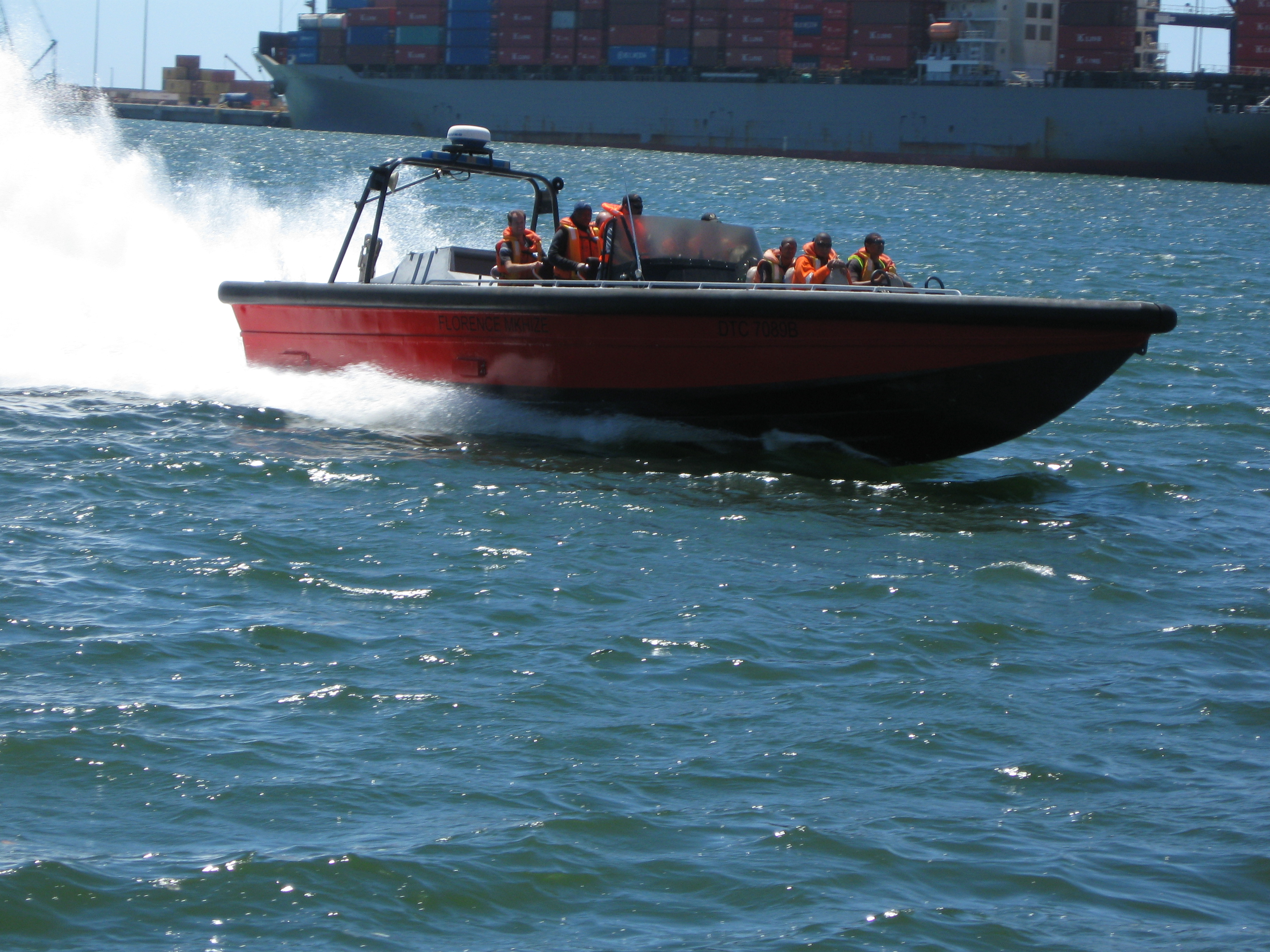
- Florence Mkhize during harbour trials

History

South Africa
- Name: Florence Mkhize
- Namesake: Florence Mkhize
- Operator: Department of Environmental Affairs
- Builder: Eraco Boat Builders, Parow, Western Cape
- Cost: 3.8 million Rand
- Launched: June 2006
- Status: in active service, as of 2012

General characteristics
- Type: Environmental protection vessel
- Length: 14 m (46 ft)
- Propulsion: 2 × 820 hp (611 kW) SeaTek engines
- Speed: 65 knots (120 km/h; 75 mph)
- Complement: 12

Florence Mkhize is an environmental protection vessel operated by the South African Ministry of the Environment. She was launched in June 2006. At 14 metres (46 ft), and capable of 65 knots (120 km/h; 75 mph), she is smaller and faster than four earlier environmental protection vessels. The three vessels in the Lillian Ngoyi class are 47 metres (154 ft) long and capable of 25 knots (46 km/h; 29 mph).

At the launch of Florence Mkhize, Marthinus van Schalkwyk, South African Ministry of the Environment, asserted the vessel's design was unique.

The hull is constructed of aluminium and she was designed and tested by Cape Advanced Engineering, a South African company based in Atlantis, Western Cape. Florence Mkhize spent her first four months in commission countering perlemoen poaching in Algoa Bay near Port Elizabeth.

All of the South African environmental patrol vessels are named after anti-apartheid heroines, like Florence Mkhize.

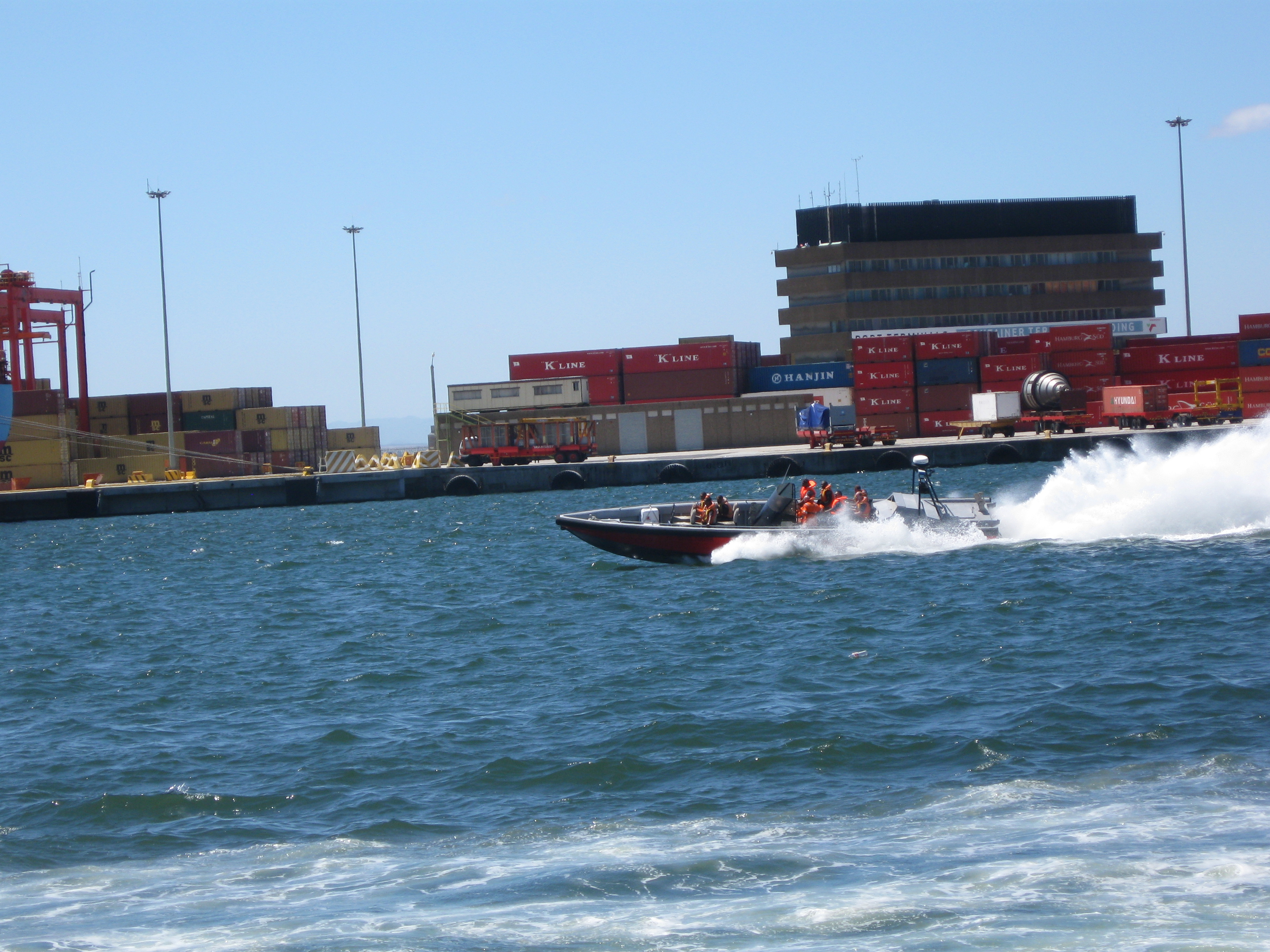
Florence Mkhize after making sharp left turn
