= Gamalakhe =

- Location within KwaZulu-Natal Location within South Africa
- Coordinates: 30°48′21″S 30°20′09″E
- Country: South Africa
- Province: KwaZulu-Natal
- District: Ugu
- Municipality: Ray Nkonyeni

Area
  - Total: 3.34 km^{2} (1.29 sq mi)

Population (2011)
  - Total: 14,098
  - Density: 4,220/km^{2} (10,900/sq mi)

Racial makeup (2011)
  - Black African: 99.3%
  - Coloured: 0.4%
  - Indian/Asian: 0.1%
  - Other: 0.1%

First languages (2011)
  - Zulu: 91.0%
  - Xhosa: 5.2%
  - English: 1.6%
  - Other: 2.1%
- Time zone: UTC+2 (SAST)
- Postal code (street): 4249
- PO box: 4249
- Area code: 039

Gamalakhe is a township situated about 6 km (4 mi) inland on the South Coast of KwaZulu-Natal Province, South Africa.

== Geography ==
Gamalakhe is situated north of the Vungu River, approximately 19 km (12 mi) from Port Shepstone and 15 km (9 mi) from Margate. Surrounding communities include Nsimbini in the north-west, Qina in the north-east and Nositha in the south which are all rural communities. The nearest urban settlements are Uvongo, Shelly Beach, Margate and Port Shepstone.

== Public Infrastructure ==
Gamalakhe has a Community Health Centre, shopping centre, Post Office, Public Library, Social Development Offices, Civic Centre, Police Station and Public Swimming Pool.

=== Education ===
Gamalakhe has 8 schools, 4 secondary schools and 4 primary schools. These schools include Olwandle High School which was crowned the champion of the Top 23 Schools Soccer Tournaments KZN in 2015.

==== Primary Schools ====
- Sethembinkosi J.P School
- Hlangeni Primary School
- Buhlebezwe Primary School
- Nsimbini Primary School

==== Secondary Schools ====
- Olwandle Secondary School
- Galeni Secondary School
- Commercial Secondary School
- Vezubuhle Secondary School

=== Transport ===
==== Roads ====
Gamalakhe is mainly accessed by turning off the P200 Izotsha Road (to Izotsha and Ramsgate) onto the P482 which is the single access road into the township. From the intersection with the P200, the P482 continues as the D202 towards St Michael’s-on-sea and Uvongo in the east.
