= St Michael's on Sea =

St Michael's-on-Sea St Micheal's / St Mikes
- Location within KwaZulu-Natal Location within South Africa
- Coordinates: 30.8212°S 30.4041°E
- Country: South Africa
- Province: KwaZulu-Natal
- District: Ugu
- Municipality: Ray Nkonyeni
- Main Place: Margate

Area
  - Total: 0.46 km^{2} (0.18 sq mi)

Population (2011)
  - Total: 299
  - Density: 650/km^{2} (1,700/sq mi)

Racial makeup (2011)
  - Black African: 35.6%
  - Indian/Asian: 3.0%
  - White: 61.41%

First languages (2011)
  - English: 45.5%
  - Afrikaans: 33.3%
  - Xhosa: 10.1%
  - Zulu: 9.4%
  - Other: 1.7%
- Time zone: UTC+2 (SAST)
- PO box: 4265

St Michael's-on-Sea (popularly known as St Michael's or St Mikes) is a small coastal village located on the South Coast of KwaZulu-Natal, South Africa, between Uvongo and Shelly Beach.

== Community initiatives ==
St Michael’s-on-Sea is part of a community-based initiative called Tidy Towns Shelly to Margate, where local communities and businesses restore civic pride between Shelly Beach and Margate, including Uvongo and Manaba Beach. Residents work in conjunction with the Ray Nkonyeni Local Municipality to maintain and manage local infrastructure.

== Geography ==
Covering a small area of only 0.46 km², St Michael's-on-Sea is situated at the mouth of the Mhlangeni River, approximately 10 km (6.2 mi) south-west of Port Shepstone and 5 km (3.1 mi) north-east of Margate and is bordered by the coastal towns of Shelly Beach to the north and Uvongo to the south.

Although the village is officially a distinct sub-place from Shelly Beach, it is often regarded as part of Shelly Beach, sharing the same postal code as the area.

== Tourism ==
In 2011, 300 people lived here, mostly in holiday homes. The village had, at one time, a reputation for being a key tourist destination and still plays host to surfing championships. The bathing beach is protected by shark nets and bodyguard patrols.

=== Beach ===
St Michael's Beach or popularly known as 'St Mike's Beach' is situated on the mouth of the Mhlangeni River, lying between its lagoon and the ocean.

=== Hospitality ===
St Michael’s-on-Sea is synonymous with the St Michaels Sands Hotel and Restaurant, the village’s main landmark and one of the most popular hotels along the South Coast. Surrounding the hotel are many holiday apartments, guest houses and B&Bs.

== Transport ==
St Michael's-on-Sea is located at the junction of Marine Drive and Knoxgore Road. Marine Drive (R620) is the main route through the village, passing from Shelly Beach in the north to Uvongo in the south, while Knoxgore Road connects St Michael’s-on-Sea with Gamalakhe to the west.

== Vegetation ==
The plant Turraea streyi is listed in the SANBI Red Data List of South African plants as critically endangered (or possibly extinct). This plant was once found at St Michaels-on-Sea, but due to cultivation, coastal development, and alien plant invasions, populations of the plant disappeared. Recent reports indicate that 50–100 plants identified as Turraea streyi have been found in its natural habitat.

== See also ==
- List of populated places in South Africa
