= Saul Mkhize =

South African human rights activist

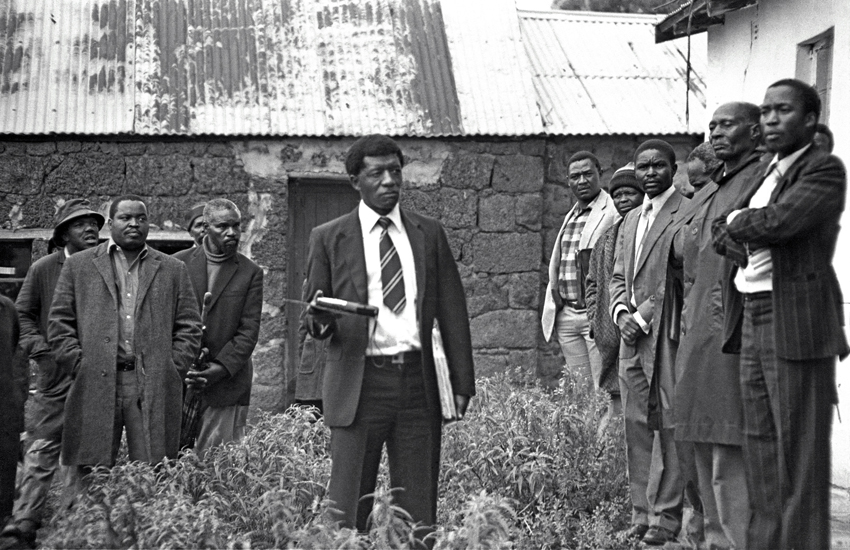
- Born: Saul Vusimuzi Mkhize; 6 June 1935; Driefontein, Mpumalanga, South Africa
- Died: 2 April 1983; Driefontein, Mpumalanga
- Cause of death: Assassinated
- Occupation: Accountant
- Spouse: Nomhlangano Beauty Mkhize

Saul Vusumzi Mkhize (6 June 1935 – 2 April 1983) was a South African human rights activist and representative for the people of Driefontein, Mpumalanga who were fighting against forceful removals from their land by the apartheid government. Mkhize was shot down by the police while organising a peaceful march.
