= Shauwn Mkhize =

South African socialite and businesswoman

- Born: 6 April 1975 (age 51); KwaZulu-Natal, South Africa
- Other names: MaMkhize; Mam'Mkhize
- Education: Durban University of Technology
- Occupations: Businesswoman; entrepreneur; philanthropist; television personality; socialite
- Children: 2

Shauwn Mkhize, also known as Mam'Mkhize, is a South African socialite, businesswoman, philanthropist, television personality and convicted fraudster.

== Early life and education ==
Shauwn Mkhize was born and raised in the village of Umbumbulu in KwaZulu-Natal under the care of her mother, Florence Mkhize who was an ANC veteran and anti-apartheid activist. She graduated with a Diploma in Accounting from ML Sultan Technikon now known as Durban University of Technology.

== Career ==
Her career began in 1996 after she graduated with a Diploma in Accounting from Durban University of Technology. She went on to work in finance departments for numerous companies, but then went into business for herself. She started off with small projects from the local municipality which included feeding schemes, painting and construction work.

=== Business ===
She started a construction company Zikhulise Group, which is Black-owned and also has several businesses including Zikhulise Maintenance and Transport, Zikhulise Auto Recoveries and Inyanga Trading. She also owned the South African football club, Royal Eagles F.C.

In October 2019, she took ownership of Royal AM Football Club formerly known as Real Kings. The club was expelled from the league in 2025 for financial misconduct and violating the league's constitution after the South African Revenue Service (SARS) issued a preservation order against the club over Mkhize's unpaid tax debts.

SARS attached and sold a number of luxury cars belonging to Mkhize towards further settlement of the R37 million tax debt. Mkhize has also previously been convicted of tax fraud in 2005.

In July 2025, Mkhize was unveiled as club president of Liswati club Mbabane Highlanders, rebranded as Mbabane Highlanders AM. In August 2025, her ownership of the club was confirmed.

=== Philanthropy ===
Shauwn Mkhize has contributed to her community in and around KwaZulu-Natal through charity and bursary schemes. In January 2020, she worked with the Department of Sports, Arts & Culture to choose a school to donate to. She donated shoes and sanitary pads to Umlazi ComTech High School. She is also a feminist and an activist for social change for the fight against gender-based violence against women and children as well as HIV and AIDS. To date, her philanthropic efforts have mainly been targeted at helping women and children in and around KwaZulu-Natal. The 2020 Hollywood And African Prestigious Awards recognized her efforts and strides in both business and philanthropy and awarded her the Woman of the Year award.

In April 2021, she collaborated with SABC 1's Expressions and the Department of Correctional Services for labour to build 20 houses for the underprivileged with the help of prison inmates.

=== Television ===
In 2020, Shauwn premiered her reality TV show, Kwa Mam' Mkhize which aired on Mzansi Magic in January 2020 and features her children Sbahle Mpisane, Andile Mpisane and her extended family. The show was awarded Best Reality TV Show at the 2020 Hollywood American Prestigious Awards.

In March 2021, she made her debut on the SABC 1 soapie, Uzalo in the role of a mysterious, wealthy woman who concludes the purchase of the Kwa Mashu Kingdom Church.

=== Social media ===
In 2020 she started to use social media and in eight months she gained over 1 million followers on Instagram. Since then her fans and followers have given her the title of "mother of the nation". In October 2020, she was nominated for Socialite of the Year and Fag Hag of the Year at the Feather Awards.

== Personal life ==
Mkhize was married to Sbu Mpisane; they divorced in 2019. They had one son Andile Mpisane. Sbu Mpisane already had a daughter.

== Fraud and unpaid taxes ==
Mkhize has been convicted of fraud in 2005 and 2012 and owed the South African Revenue Service (SARS) over R200 million in 2013. In May 2024, SARS obtained a provisional preservation order for a fleet of luxury vehicles in order to recoup R37 million taxes owed. However, Mkhize's security and armed guards refused to allow the order to be executed. In July 2024, an attempted assassination was carried out on advocate Coreth Naude as she left a tax enquiry into the affairs of Mkhize and her company, Royal AM Football Club. The attempted assassination follows the 2023 assassination of Cloete Murray, who had worked with Naude on the tax inquiry into Mkhize's empire.

In November 2024, more than 40 firearms were confiscated from Mkhize's mansion during a raid by the Hawks, police and SA Revenue Service. The firearms belonged to the security company owned by businessman Vusumuzi “Cat” Matlala, who has been implicated in allegations made by KwaZulu-Natal police commissioner Lt-Gen Nhlanhla Mkhwanazi against senior law enforcement officials and politicians, accusing them of interfering in cases police are investigating. Mkhwanazi mentioned that WhatsApp messages found on Matlala's phone allegedly involve police minister Senzo Mchunu.

In January 2025, the South African Revenue Service issued a preservation order against Royal AM over unpaid tax debts by Mkhize, and the club was put up for auction in March.

In August 2025, the Pietermaritzburg High Court ruled that her football club, Royal AM, was required to pay back R27 million for an unlawful and invalid sponsorship agreement with the bankrupt Msunduzi Municipality. The sponsorship commenced in 2023, and was for R9 million a year.

As of November 2025, SARS has held three auctions of her assets in order to reclaim its unpaid debt. In the first, in July 2025, ten luxury cars were auctioned for R8.2 million. The second auction in October 2025 reclaimed R5.6 million for luxury handbags and another luxury vehicle. The third auction will dispose of luxury alcohol.

== Awards and nominations ==
Year	Award	Category	Result
2020	Feather Awards	Socialite of the Year	Nominated
2020	Feather Awards	Fag Hag of the Year	Nominated
2020	Hollywood and African Prestigious Awards	Women of the Year	Won
2020	Hollywood and African Prestigious Awards	Best Reality TV Show	Won
2022	2022 DStv Mzansi Viewers' Choice Awards	Favourite personality	Nominated

== Filmography ==
=== Television ===
Year	Title	Role	Notes
2020–present	Kwa Mam’ Mkhize	Herself	Main cast
2021–present	Uzalo	Herself	recurring role
