= Shelly Centre =

Shopping centre in Shelly Beach, South Africa

- Interactive map of the Shelly Centre area

General information
- Location: Marine Drive, Shelly Beach, KwaZulu-Natal, South Africa
- Coordinates: 30.8104°S 30.4095°E
- Inaugurated: 23 August 1985
- Renovated: 2003, 2015

Other information
- Number of stores: 77 stores

Website
- shellycentre.co.za/index.php

Shelly Centre is a South African shopping centre located in Shelly Beach, KwaZulu-Natal. It serves the Lower South Coast (from Hibberdene to Port Edward) and has 70 stores.

== History ==
On 23 August 1985, Shelly Centre was opened by residents of the South Coast due to the fact that it was the South Coast's first major shopping mall. It also made Shelly Centre the first place on the Lower South Coast to boast an escalator.

In 2015, a multi-million rand upgrade took place at Shelly Centre to modernise the shopping centre as the last upgrade took place in 2003. The upgrade was aimed at creating a consistent look and modern feel using wood and natural elements. In 2018, a new logo for the shopping centre was introduced.

Previously owned by Sanlam, Shelly Centre was recently sold to Trident, a property investment holding company, in August 2025 after receiving approval from the Competition Commission.

== Mall contents ==
Shelly Centre has 6 movie theatres operated by Ster-Kinekor (to be shut down permanently soon), 10 restaurants and eateries, more than 70 stores in total, undercover parking and non-undercover parking.

Anchor tenants in Shelly Centre include PicknPay, Woolworths, Truworths, Edgars and SterKinekor.
