= Uvongo =

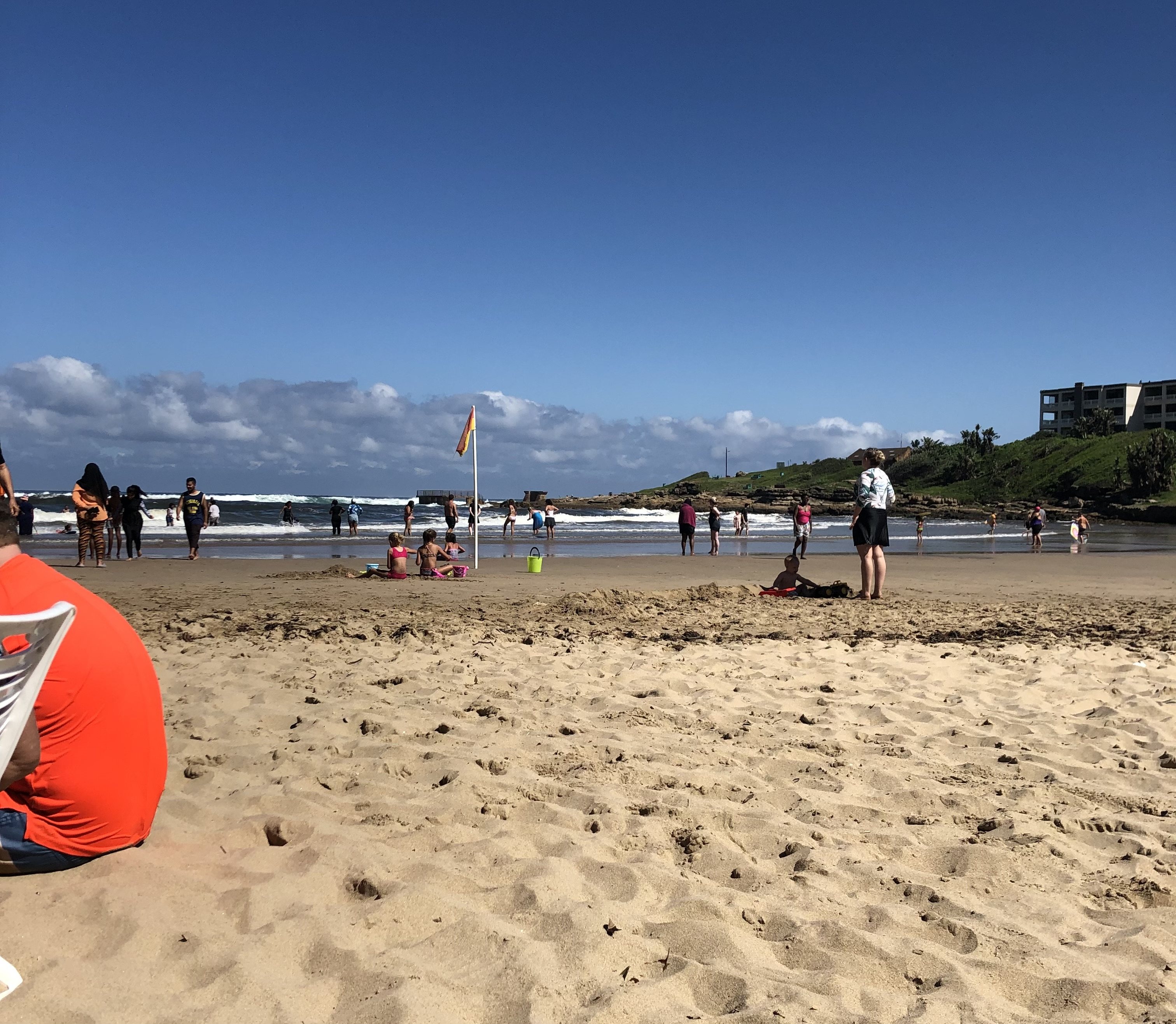
- Uvongo Beach

- Location within KwaZulu-Natal Location within South Africa
- Coordinates: 30°49′S 30°23′E
- Country: South Africa
- Province: KwaZulu-Natal
- District: Ugu
- Municipality: Ray Nkonyeni
- Main Place: Margate

Area
  - Total: 4.52 km^{2} (1.75 sq mi)

Population (2011)
  - Total: 4,288
  - Density: 949/km^{2} (2,460/sq mi)

Racial makeup (2011)
  - Black African: 21.6%
  - Coloured: 2.0%
  - Indian/Asian: 4.4%
  - White: 71.8%
  - Other: 0.3%

First languages (2011)
  - English: 57.7%
  - Afrikaans: 25.5%
  - Zulu: 8.1%
  - Xhosa: 5.6%
  - Other: 3.2%
- Time zone: UTC+2 (SAST)
- Postal code (street): 4270
- PO box: 4270

Uvongo is a seaside resort town situated at the mouth of the Vungu River along the South Coast of KwaZulu-Natal, South Africa. Situated 4 kilometres (2.5 mi) north of Margate, Uvongo is the largest upmarket residential area on the Lower South Coast.

Uvongo Beach lost its "Blue Flag" title due to storms damaging it in April 2007 but has managed to regain a clean and prestigious beach front. Uvongo still remains the playground of the rich, with multimillion rand properties in the area.

== Etymology ==
The town is named after the main river flowing through the area, the Vungu River, which is derived from the Zulu word that describes the sound of a waterfall or the wind in a gorge.

== Geography ==
Uvongo is situated between the coastal towns of St Michael’s-on-Sea and Shelly Beach to the north, and Manaba Beach and Margate to the south. Situated south of the Mhlangeni River, it is also bisected by the Vungu River, which forms the 23-metre Uvongo Falls above the lagoon that flows into a small gorge at the river mouth.

The Greater Uvongo area consists of three suburbs: Uvongo proper, inland from the coast; Uvongo Beach, along the coastline north of the Vungu River; and Beacon Rocks, situated south of the river.

== Industries ==
The Uvongo industrial area, situated west of the R61, is the second largest industrial area on the Lower South Coast after Marburg in Port Shepstone. It hosts a variety of small to medium local businesses, with the Natal Portland Cement (NPC) Quarry being the most notable economic activity. The area is primarily accessed via Quarry Road, off Wingate Road, near opposite the R61/Margate/Uvongo interchange.

== Transport ==
=== Roads ===
Uvongo is bisected by the R620 (Marine Drive) connecting Shelly Beach to the north with Margate to the south. Situated just off the R61 highway (future N2 Wild Coast Toll Route) between Port Shepstone to the north and Port Edward to the south, the area is also accessible via Knoxgore Road from Gamalakhe in the north-west and Seaslopes Avenue, which provides direct access to the R61.

== See also ==
- Black December
- St Michael's-on-Sea
- KwaZulu-Natal South Coast
