= Ramsgate, South Africa =

Ramsgate
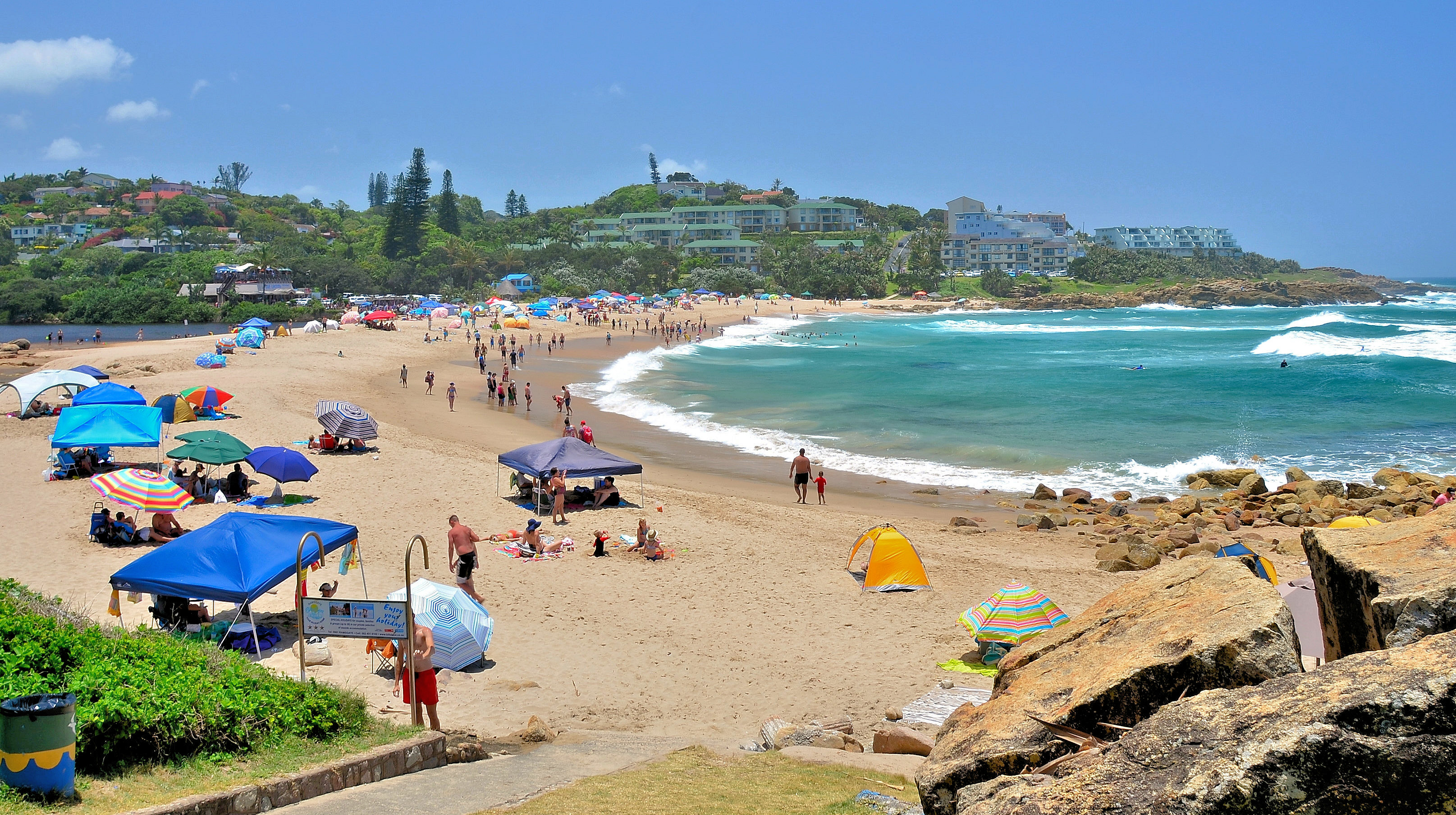
- Ramsgate Main Beach

- Location within KwaZulu-Natal Location within South Africa
- Coordinates: 30°52′56″S 30°21′20″E
- Country: South Africa
- Province: KwaZulu-Natal
- District: Ugu
- Municipality: Ray Nkonyeni
- Main Place: Margate

Area
  - Total: 0.83 km^{2} (0.32 sq mi)

Population (2011)
  - Total: 1,080
  - Density: 1,300/km^{2} (3,400/sq mi)

Racial makeup (2011)
  - Black African: 41.7%
  - Coloured: 1.9%
  - Indian/Asian: 2.0%
  - White: 54.0%
  - Other: 0.4%

First languages (2011)
  - English: 46.0%
  - Afrikaans: 20.6%
  - Zulu: 16.8%
  - Xhosa: 13.3%
  - Other: 3.3%
- Time zone: UTC+2 (SAST)
- PO box: 4275
- Area code: 039
- Website: ramsgatevillage.co.za

Ramsgate is a village on the south coast of KwaZulu-Natal in South Africa, just southwest of Margate. Ramsgate is located on the mouth of a river known by the Zulu name Bilanhlolo ("the marvellous boiler") for the bubbles caused by strong currents making it look like the water is boiling. In 1922, there was only one person living there, Paul Buck, a painter and violin maker and he called the place Blue Lagoon.

== Infrastructure ==
=== Roads ===
Ramsgate is mainly reached via the R61 (future N2 Wild Coast Toll Route) from Port Shepstone in the north and Port Edward in the south and the R620 (Marine Drive) from Margate in the north and Southbroom in the south. It can also be reached via the P200 (Izotsha Road) from Gamalakhe and Izotsha in the north-west.
