= Umhlali =

Village in KwaZulu-Natal, South Africa

Umhlali eMhlali
- Location within KwaZulu-Natal Location within South Africa
- Coordinates: 29°28′39″S 31°13′07″E
- Country: South Africa
- Province: KwaZulu-Natal
- District: iLembe
- Municipality: KwaDukuza

Area
  - Total: 2.26 km^{2} (0.87 sq mi)

Population (2011)
  - Total: 338
  - Density: 150/km^{2} (387/sq mi)

Racial makeup (2011)
  - Black African: 48.2%
  - Indian/Asian: 14.8%
  - White: 36.7%
  - Other: 0.3%

First languages (2011)
  - English: 45.0%
  - Zulu: 31.7%
  - Afrikaans: 6.5%
  - Other: 6.1%
- Time zone: UTC+2 (SAST)
- Postal code (street): 4390
- PO box: 4390

Umhlali (Zulu: eMhlali) is a village on the North Coast of the KwaZulu-Natal province of South Africa, just inland from Salt Rock and approximately 50 km north-east of Durban. The village's name comes from the Zulu name for the Monkey Orange tree, which is found alongside the uMhlali River.

Umhlali is a small agricultural village supported by its sugarcane farming. It has a post office, petrol station, shop, lifestyle centre, cafes and restaurants, automotive services, and agricultural stores.

== Geography ==
Located in the hilly countryside, Umhlali lies just south of the uMhlali River, after which it is named. The village is about 3 km (1.9 mi) south of Shakaskraal (north of the uMhlali River), 3 km (1.9 mi) west of the coastal village of Salt Rock, and 9 km (5.6 mi) northwest of the coastal town of Ballito.

Umhlali also forms part of the Dolphin Coast, which incorporates Ballito, Shaka's Rock, Salt Rock, Sheffield Beach, Tinley Manor Beach, Zinkwazi Beach and Shakaskraal.

== Infrastructure ==
=== Rail ===
The main Metrorail route between Durban in the south-east (via oThongathi) and KwaDukuza in the north-east (via Shakaskraal), known as the North Coast Line, has a station in the village, namely the Umhlali railway station.

=== Roads ===
Umhlali lies at the junction of the R102 and Salt Rock Road. The R102 bisects the village in a north–south direction, connecting Shakaskraal with oThongathi, while Salt Rock Road connects Umhlali with Salt Rock to the east and provides access to the N2 highway which runs north–south from KwaDukuza to Durban.
