= Sheffield Beach =

- Location within KwaZulu-Natal Location within South Africa
- Coordinates: 29°29.124′S 31°15.133′E
- Country: South Africa
- Province: KwaZulu-Natal
- District: iLembe
- Municipality: KwaDukuza

Area
  - Total: 7.72 km^{2} (2.98 sq mi)

Population (2011)
  - Total: 1,754
  - Density: 227/km^{2} (588/sq mi)

Racial makeup (2011)
  - Black African: 24.1%
  - Coloured: 0.6%
  - Indian/Asian: 20.9%
  - White: 52.9%
  - Other: 1.5%

First languages (2011)
  - English: 69.9%
  - Zulu: 14.4%
  - Afrikaans: 7.6%
  - Other: 8.1%
- Time zone: UTC+2 (SAST)
- Postal code (street): 4420

Sheffield Beach is a small coastal village located on the North Coast of KwaZulu-Natal, just north of Ballito and some 26 kilometres (16.2) south of KwaDukuza and 53 kilometres (32.9 mi) north-east of Durban.

== Geography ==
Sheffield Beach is situated about 9 kilometres (5.6 mi) north of Ballito, positioned north of Salt Rock, east of uMhlali, and at the northern edge of the Greater Ballito urban area. To the north lies Tinley Manor Beach, separated from Sheffield Beach by roughly 2 kilometres of undeveloped land

According to the 2011 census, the main place of Sheffield Beach comprises three sub-places, namely, Sheffield Beach SP along the coast, Brettenwood Coastal Estate to the south-west and Sheffield Manor to the west bordering the N2.

== Growth ==
In recent years, residential development in the greater Sheffield Beach area has expanded beyond the original village, transforming former sugarcane land into sought-after residents estates. Notable residential developments include Brettenwood Coastal Estate, Seaton Estate, Elaleni Estate, Zululami Estate, and Sheffield Manor.

== Transport ==
=== Roads ===
Sheffield Beach lies just off the N2 (connecting to KwaDukuza in the north and Durban in the south) which currently can be accessed via Salt Rock Road and Sheffield Beach Road at the N2/Salt Rock interchange. The area can also be accessed from Salt Rock via Wilkes Road and Hugh Dent Drive.

==== Road Developments ====
A new interchange on the N2, featuring south-facing on- and off-ramps, is currently under construction to accommodate the growth of the area. Once complete, it will provide a direct connection to Sheffield Beach, eliminating the need to route through the Salt Rock/uMhlali interchange.
