= North Coast (KwaZulu-Natal) =

Coastal region in KwaZulu-Natal, South Africa

Location of the KZN North Coast

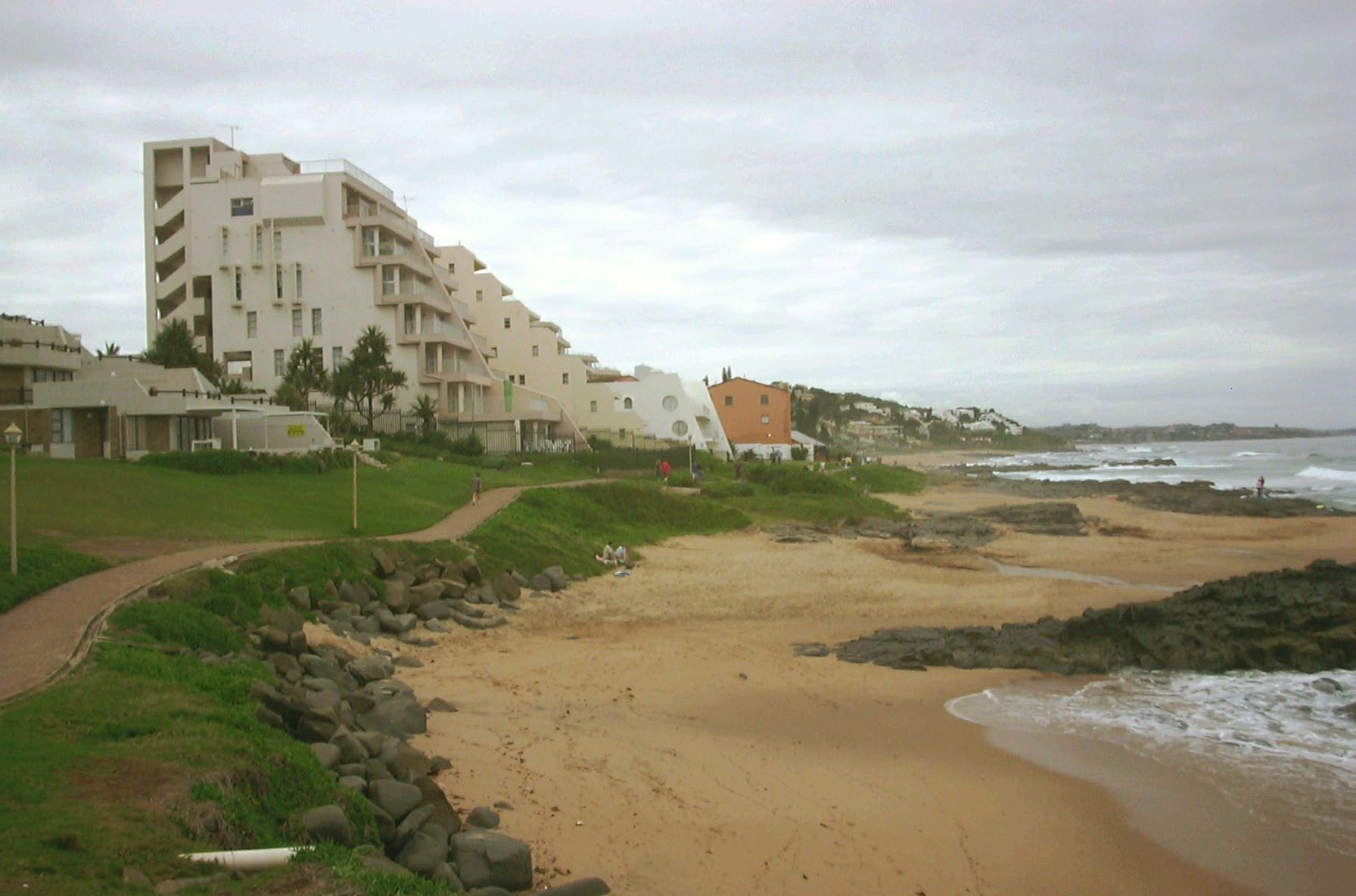
Ballito, KwaZulu-Natal North Coast

The KwaZulu-Natal North Coast, better known as the North Coast is a coastal region north of Durban in KwaZulu-Natal, South Africa. It stretches from Zinkwazi Beach in the north to Zimbali near Ballito in the south. The coastal region is governed by the KwaDukuza Local Municipality, forming part of the iLembe District Municipality.

Affectionately named the “Dolphin Coast”, its main towns are Ballito, Salt Rock and KwaDukuza. As of 2011 the KwaZulu-Natal North Coast has a population of 231,187 (KwaDukuza Local Municipality).

== Geography ==
Situated along the east coast of South Africa and bounded by the Indian Ocean to the east, the North Coast lies between the Zululand region to the north, the KwaZulu-Natal Midlands to the west and the uMhlanga Coast to the south.

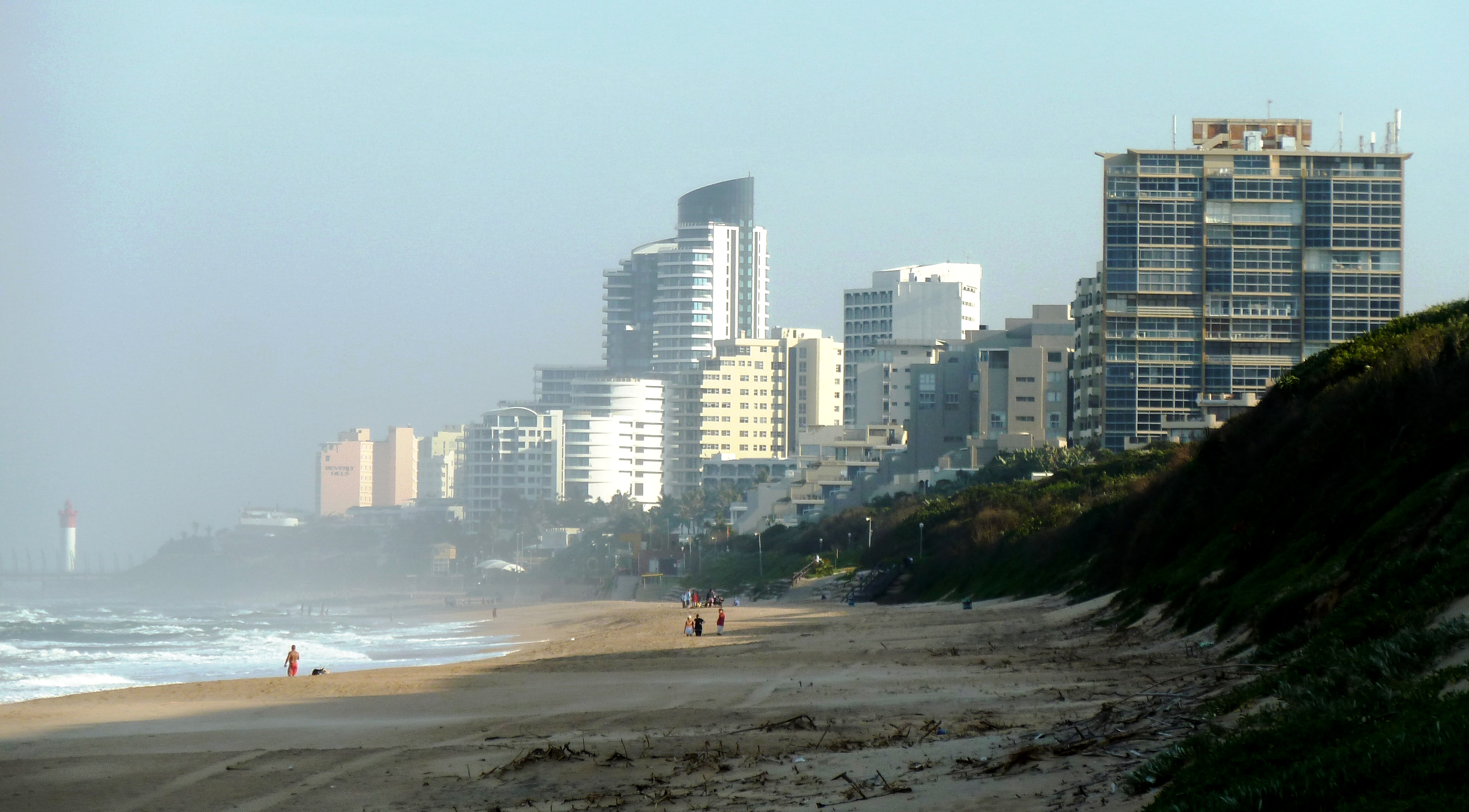
uMhlanga, just north of Durban

Traditionally the North Coast has been regarded as the stretch of coastline between uMhlanga and Zinkwazi Beach while it has officially been defined as the stretch of coastline between Zimbali (Ballito) and the mouth of the uThukela River near Zinkwazi Beach.

Major rivers of the North Coast include the uThongathi River, uMhlali River, uMvoti River, Zinkwazi River and uThukela River.

== Administration ==
The region is governed by the KwaDukuza Local Municipality (KDM) which is seated in the town of KwaDukuza (formerly Stanger) and is part of the larger iLembe District Municipality. KDM governs the coastal settlements of Ballito, Blythedale Beach, Salt Rock, Shaka's Rock, Sheffield Beach, Tinley Manor Beach and Zinkwazi Beach and the inland settlements of Darnall, Groutville, KwaDukuza, Shakaskraal and Umhlali

== Economy ==
The town of Ballito is the primary commercial hub of the North Coast. The North Coast (including uMhlanga) has seen a massive development boom over the recent years especially Ballito which has been growing exponentially with new developments such as new shopping centres, other retail outlets, private schools, a private hospital and new gated residential estates. The small resort village of Salt Rock just north of Shaka's Rock has also seen growth with recent developments such as the Tiffany's and Salt Rock City shopping centres and the Curro Mount Richmore private school. KwaDukuza has also seen growth (although much less than Ballito) with the recent development of the KwaDukuza Mall which opened in 2018.

KwaDukuza is the administrative centre of the North Coast and includes the head offices of the KwaDukuza Local Municipality and iLembe District Municipality. There is also a Magistrate's court and the Department of Home Affairs and the South African Social Security Agency (SASSA) have regional offices in KwaDukuza.

== Facilities ==
=== Public Hospitals ===
- General Justice Gizenga Mpanza Regional Hospital, KwaDukuza

=== Private Hospitals ===
- Netcare Alberlito Hospital, Ballito
- KwaDukuza Private Hospital, KwaDukuza

== Golfing ==
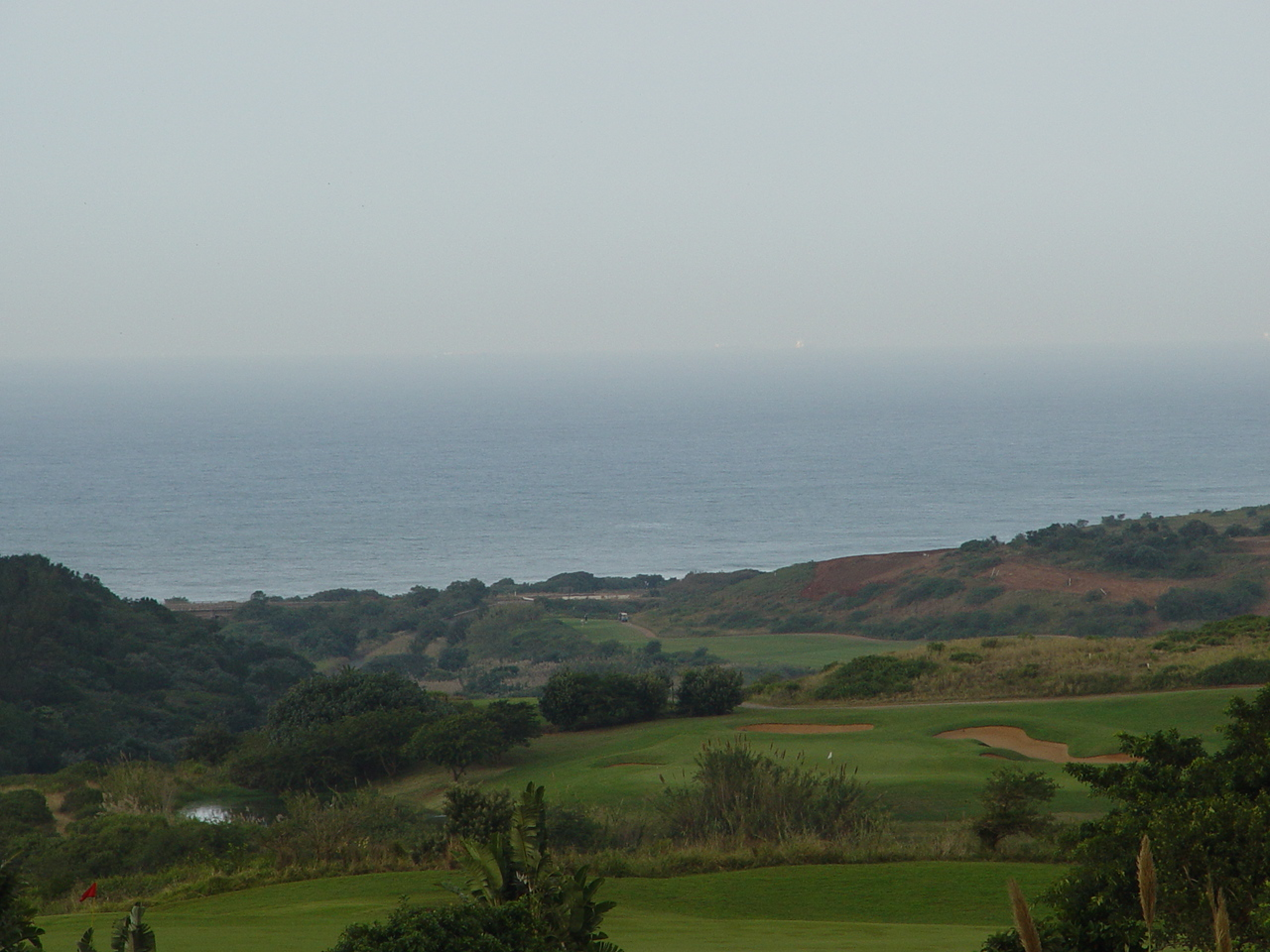
Zimbali Country Club

This is a list of golf courses on the KwaZulu-Natal North Coast:

- Prince's Grant Golf Course, Prince's Grant Golf Estate
- Simbithi Country Club, Ballito
- Umhlali Country Club, uMhlali/Ballito
- Zimbali Country Club, Ballito

== Tourism ==
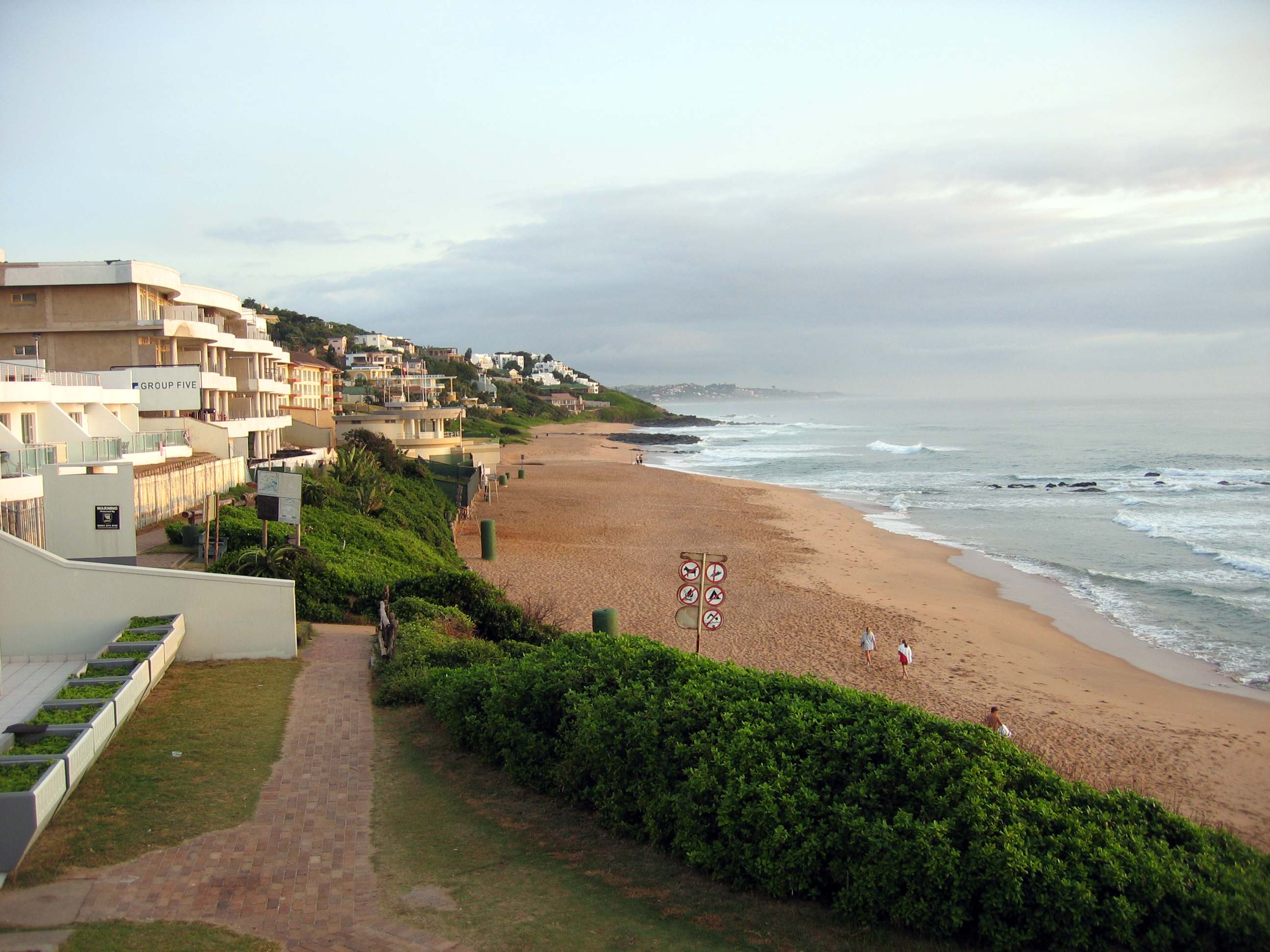
Ballito Beach

The North Coast has always been popular with anglers because the fishing is so good. This may be due to the many sheltered lagoons which open into the Indian Ocean and which serve as nurseries for small fish and other sea creatures. The area is also known for its good surf and the internationally recognized Mr Price Pro-surfing contest, which draws competitors from all over the world, is held in Ballito annually.

Outside the domestic holiday season and long-weekends, many of these places are quiet, however, during the seasonal holiday influx, the many holiday homes, excellent restaurants and nightclubs fill up and so do the beaches and many other attractions along the coast.

Tourist attractions along the North Coast include:

- Ballito & North Coast Microflight Flights
- Ballito Ski Park
- Clubventure
- Crocodile Creek
- Flag Animal Farm
- Granny's Pool
- Harold Johnson Nature Reserve
- Hole-in-the-wall
- Holla Trails
- King Shaka Memorial
- Luthuli Museum
- Monkeyland KZN
- Ndlondlo Reptile Par.k
- North Coast Venoumous Snake Park
- Salt Rock Tidal Pool
- Sugar Rush Park
- Thompson Bay Rock Pool

== Towns ==
- Ballito
- Blythedale Beach
- Darnall
- Groutville
- KwaDukuza
- Salt Rock
- Shakaskraal
- Shaka's Rock
- Sheffield Beach
- Tinley Manor Beach
- Umhlali
- Zinkwazi Beach

== Transport ==
=== Air ===
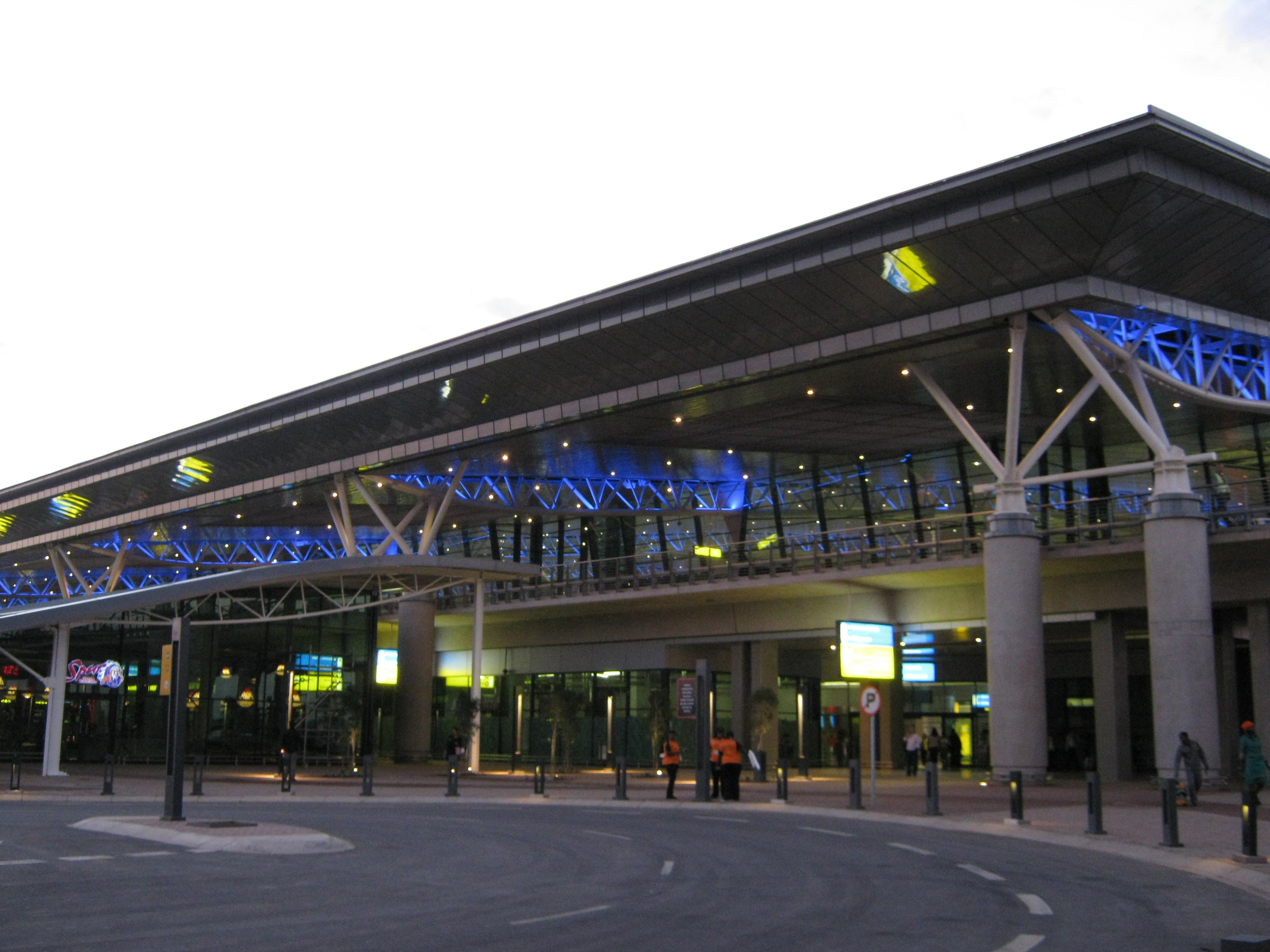
King Shaka International Airport is the nearest airport to the North Coast

The King Shaka International Airport, situated 32 km (19.9 mi) north-east of Durban and 21 km (13 mi) south-west of Ballito is conveniently located within the greater vicinity of the North Coast offering flights to a number of domestic destinations such as Bloemfontein, Cape Town, East London, George, Gqeberha, Johannesburg and Mbombela as well as international destinations such as Doha, Dubai, Gaborone, Harare, Istanbul, Lusaka and Manzini.

=== Roads ===
Vehicle registrations on the North Coast start with NT - N for Natal and T for (Lower) Tugela, due to its location south of the uThukela (Tugela) River.

The North Coast is intersected by one national route, the N2 and two regional routes including the R102 and R74.

The N2 named the North Coast Toll Road is a toll freeway leading northwards to Empangeni, oPhongolo and the province of Mpumalanga and southwards to Durban, the South Coast and the provinces of the Eastern Cape and Western Cape. The Mvoti toll plaza is the main toll plaza along this stretch of the toll route within the North Coast.

The R102 runs parallel to the N2 and leads northwards to Gingindlovu and Empangeni and southwards to oThongathi (Tongaat) and Verulam. The R102 functions as an alternative route between the North Coast, Durban and Empangeni for motorists avoiding tolling along the N2.

The R74 leads westwards into the interior from Blythedale Beach and KwaDukuza to Greytown and Colenso in the Midlands of KwaZulu-Natal.

== Media ==
The newspapers in the KZN North Coast are the North Coast Courier Stanger Weekly and The Bugle. In terms of radio, East Coast Radio and Ukhozi FM are the main radio stations mainly serving the whole province of KwaZulu-Natal.
