= Ballito Public Library =

Public library at 51 Compensation Beach Rd in Ballito, South Africa

Coordinates: 29°32′26″S 31°12′59″E

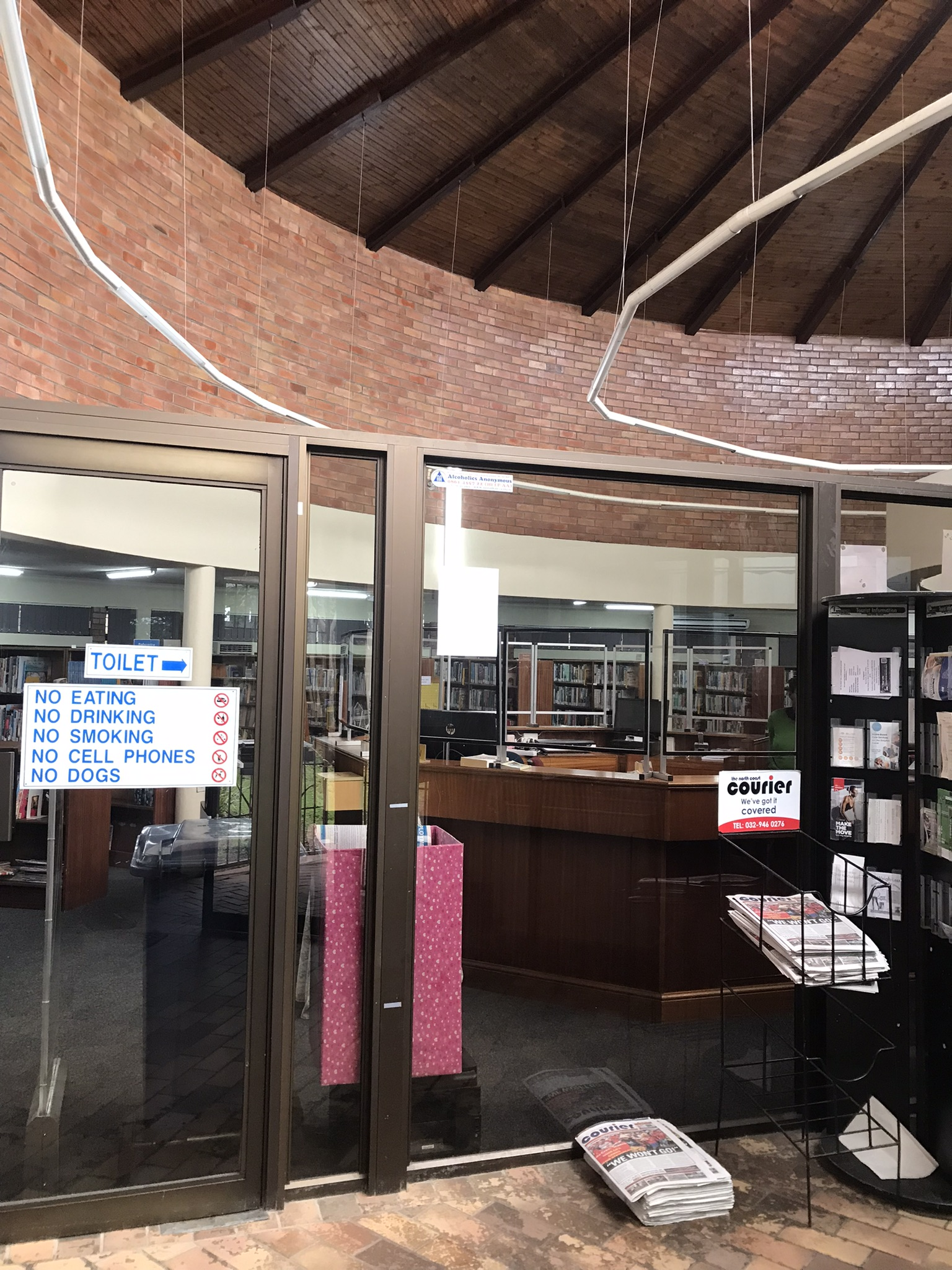
- Entrance to the Ballito Public Library
- Location: 51 Compensation Beach Rd, Ballito (KwaDukuza Local Municipality), KwaZulu-Natal, South Africa
- Type: Public library
- Established: 1990
- Branch of: KwaZulu-Natal Provincial Library and Information Services

The Ballito Public Library is a community library situated in the north coast town of Ballito, in KwaZulu-Natal, South Africa.

== History ==
The old Ballito Library was originally located in library lane, The new library building was designed in the shape of a shell, by the architect Duncan McLagan in 1990.
