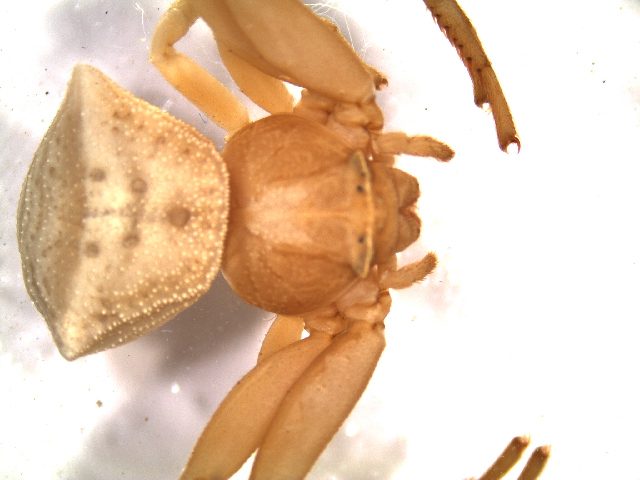
- female from South Africa

Scientific classification
- Kingdom: Animalia
- Phylum: Arthropoda
- Subphylum: Chelicerata
- Class: Arachnida
- Order: Araneae
- Infraorder: Araneomorphae
- Family: Thomisidae
- Genus: Thomisus
- Species: T. natalensis

Binomial name
- Thomisus natalensis Lawrence, 1942

= Thomisus natalensis =

Natal Thomisus crab spider

Species of spider

Thomisus natalensis is a species of crab spider in the family Thomisidae. It is endemic to southern Africa, where it has been recorded from South Africa and Zimbabwe. The species is commonly known as the Natal Thomisus crab spider.

== Distribution ==
Thomisus natalensis was originally described from Umhlali on the North Coast of KwaZulu-Natal province in South Africa. The species has since been recorded from additional locations in South Africa, including Lake Sibayi and Sodwana Bay in the iSimangaliso Wetland Park. New records have extended its known distribution to Zimbabwe, where specimens were collected from the Changadzi River area.

== Habitat ==
Thomisus natalensis is a poorly known species found in low-growing vegetation. The specimens from Sodwana Bay were specifically collected from this type of habitat. The species appears to be restricted to the Indian Ocean Coastal Belt Biome.

== Description ==
Only females of Thomisus natalensis are known.

Females are relatively small spiders with a total length of 8.8 mm. The cephalothorax measures 4.3 mm in length and 4.7 mm in width. The overall coloration is predominantly yellow. The cephalothorax and legs are uniformly yellow, while the opisthosoma is white. The front pair of legs shows white suffusion on the upper lateral surfaces.

The cephalothorax is slightly wider than long and notably high. The eye region features tubercles that form a distinct edge between the clypeus and the dorsal part of the cephalothorax. Both eye rows are recurved, with the anterior median eyes smaller than the anterior lateral eyes, and the posterior eyes equal in size. The opisthosoma, when viewed from above, is pentagonal in shape with almost straight sides. The legs have distinctive spination, with tibiae I and II bearing 2-3 pairs of large bristles, and metatarsi I and II having 5-6 pairs.

The body and legs are covered with numerous minute tubercles, each bearing a club-shaped bristle, giving the spider a smoother appearance compared to related species such as Thomisus scrupeus. The epigyne is very characteristic, being ovate with slightly darkened edges.

== Conservation status ==
Thomisus natalensis is considered a rare species with a limited distribution. In South Africa, it is known from only one province, occurring at elevations between 20-43 meters above sea level. Despite its limited known range, it has been assessed as Least Concern due to its wider distribution across southern Africa.

== Taxonomy ==
The species was first described by R. F. Lawrence in 1942 based on female specimens from Umhlali. It was later revised by Dippenaar-Schoeman in 1983, who provided detailed morphological descriptions and extended the known distribution. The species is morphologically closest to T. scrupeus and T. zuluanus.
