= Shakaskraal =

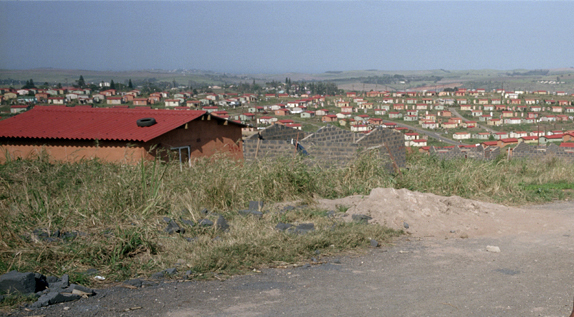

- Location within KwaZulu-Natal Location within South Africa
- Coordinates: 29°27′S 31°13′E
- Country: South Africa
- Province: KwaZulu-Natal
- District: iLembe
- Municipality: KwaDukuza
  - Councillor: (ANC)

Area
  - Total: 2.19 km^{2} (0.85 sq mi)

Population (2011)
  - Total: 3,296
  - Density: 1,510/km^{2} (3,900/sq mi)

Racial makeup (2011)
  - Black African: 22.2%
  - Coloured: 2.4%
  - Indian/Asian: 74.1%
  - White: 0.3%
  - Other: 1.0%

First languages (2011)
  - English: 78.4%
  - Zulu: 14.1%
  - Afrikaans: 1.6%
  - Xhosa: 1.6%
  - Other: 4.3%
- Time zone: UTC+2 (SAST)
- Postal code (street): 4430
- PO box: 4430
- Area code: 032

Shakaskraal is a town in the iLembe District Municipality in the KwaZulu-Natal province of South Africa, situated approximately 15 kilometres (9 mi) south-west of KwaDukuza and 53 kilometres (33 mi) north-east of Durban. The town is dominated by local businesses and informal traders and main activities located in and nearby is sugarcane farming.

== Geography ==
Shakaskraal is situated on the northern banks of the uMhlali River surrounded by the hilly sugarcane plantations of the Dolphin Coast of KwaZulu-Natal, which is the Greater Ballito area. The town is located approximately 3 kilometres (2 mi) north of Umhlali, 10 kilometres (6 mi) inland of Tinley Manor Beach, and is located centrally to KwaDukuza and Ballito as it is 12 kilometres (7 mi) north of Ballito and 15 kilometres (9 mi) south-west of KwaDukuza.

== Infrastructure ==
=== Rail ===
Shakaskraal is served by the Shakaskraal Railway Station which is situated on the North Coast Line (Durban- KwaDukuza Line) and is operated by Metrorail with the North Coast Line trains running northwards to Groutville and KwaDukuza (Stanger) and southwards to Umhlali, oThongathi (Tongaat) and Durban.

=== Roads ===
The R102 is the main north–south road connecting Shakaskraal with Groutville and KwaDukuza to the north and Umhlali and oThongathi to the south (passes through the town centre) and is the untolled alternative route to the tolled N2 freeway. The P467 route is an east–west road connecting Shakaskraal with Palm Lakes Estate and Tinley Manor Beach and provides access to the N2 freeway (to Durban and KwaDukuza) by-passing Shakaskraal to the east.

== Landmarks ==
The Shakaskraal Mosque is one of the most prominent landmarks and easily identifiable by its expansive dome towers and sits directly opposite the towns hardware and building supply store uShaka Megabuild.
