= Tinley Manor Beach =

Tinley Manor Beach: Tinley Manor
- Location within KwaZulu-Natal Location within South Africa
- Coordinates: 29°26.538′S 31°17.123′E
- Country: South Africa
- Province: KwaZulu-Natal
- District: iLembe
- Municipality: KwaDukuza

Area
  - Total: 0.87 km^{2} (0.34 sq mi)

Population (2011)
  - Total: 427
  - Density: 490/km^{2} (1,300/sq mi)

Racial makeup (2011)
  - Black African: 17.8%
  - Coloured: 4.7%
  - Indian/Asian: 56.2%
  - White: 20.4%
  - Other: 0.9%

First languages (2011)
  - English: 78.0%
  - Zulu: 6.8%
  - Afrikaans: 5.6%
  - Other: 9.6%
- Time zone: UTC+2 (SAST)
- PO box: 4430

Tinley Manor Beach, or commonly known as Tinley Manor, is a coastal village located on the Dolphin Coast of KwaZulu-Natal, South Africa. Tinley Manor Beach is about 60 kilometres (38 mi) north of Durban and 18 kilometres (11 mi) south of KwaDukuza. It forms part of the KwaDukuza Local Municipality, and iLembe District Municipality.

== Geography ==
Located on northern banks of the mouth of the uMhlali River, approximately 17 kilometres (11 mi) north of Ballito, Tinley Manor Beach is surrounded by the settlements of Sheffield Beach (14 km by road) to the south and Shakaskraal (10 km by road) to the west.

== Tourism ==
=== Developments ===
Club Med, a major French-based resort chain, launched its first resort in Southern Africa, north of Tinley Manor Beach on 4 July 2026, being a major tourism milestone for the KwaZulu-Natal Province (KZN). Developed by Collins Residential, major property developer in KZN, the resort offers 400 rooms and villas, a 500-seat conference venue, Club Med's first global surf school, and access to a Big Five reserve near oPhongolo, blending beach and bush. As a result, this integrated leisure and business concept is expected to attract both local and international travellers.

Strategically located just 20 minutes from King Shaka International Airport, the resort capitalises on improved accessibility since the relocation of the airport in 2010. Embracing a "global" model, the resort will cater to both local and global markets, with a strong focus on local job creation (over 1,000 jobs are expected to be created).

Construction began in early 2024 after seven years of planning, overcoming pandemic-related and regional hurdles. The sales launch in October 2024 proved that the high interest in the resort, supported by efforts to enhance air connectivity with markets such as the United Kingdom, France, and India. The Tinley Manor site was selected for its location along the warm waters of the Indian Ocean and a favourable subtropical climate nearly year-round. The design will feature local materials, Zulu craftsmanship, and sustainability credentials like BREEAM certification.

With the rapid expansion of Ballito and Salt Rock to the south, Tinley Manor and Palm Lakes Estate (to the west, along P467) have remained relatively stable and undervalued. However, the anticipated "Club Med effect" could transform the area, extending the growth of the Greater Ballito region further north beyond Sheffield Beach and triggering large-scale investment over the next decade. Early signs include talks of a new shopping centre near the N2/Tinley Manor interchange, with additional infrastructure such as hospitals and schools likely to follow.

== Transport ==
Tinley Manor Beach lies just off the N2 (North Coast Toll Road) passing from KwaDukuza in the north to Ballito and Durban in the south. The coastal village is only accessed via a single road, the P467, which connects directly to the N2 interchange and extends westward toward Palm Lakes Estate and Shakaskraal.
