= Salt Rock =

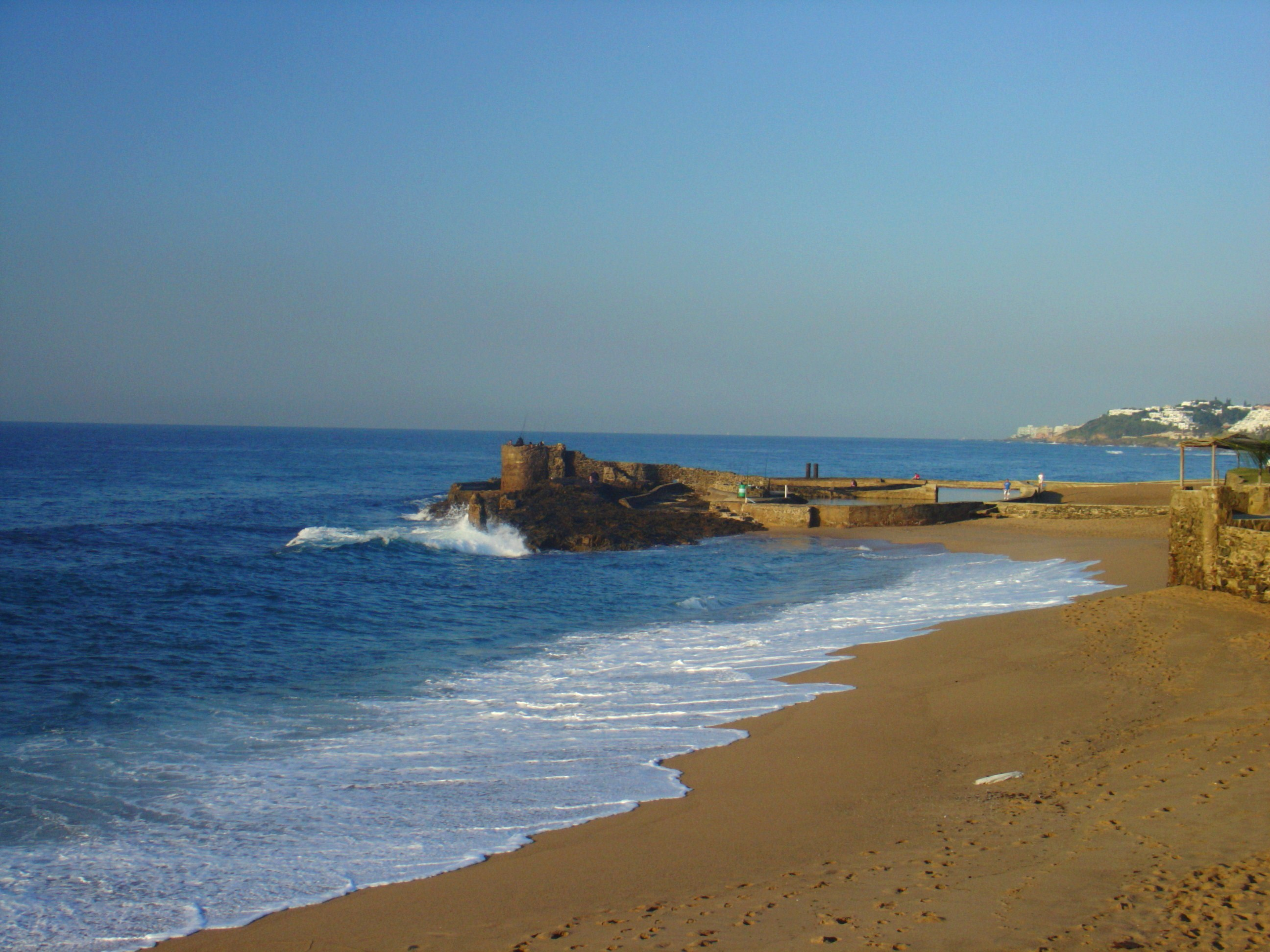
- Salt Rock Beach

- Location within KwaZulu-Natal Location within South Africa
- Coordinates: 29°30.183′S 31°14.333′E
- Country: South Africa
- Province: KwaZulu-Natal
- District: iLembe
- Municipality: KwaDukuza

Area
  - Total: 4.91 km^{2} (1.90 sq mi)

Population (2011)
  - Total: 1,806
  - Density: 368/km^{2} (953/sq mi)

Racial makeup (2011)
  - Black African: 19.0%
  - Coloured: 1.3%
  - Indian/Asian: 2.3%
  - White: 76.4%
  - Other: 0.9%

First languages (2011)
  - English: 66.9%
  - Zulu: 13.5%
  - Afrikaans: 13.4%
  - Xhosa: 1.4%
  - Other: 4.8%
- Time zone: UTC+2 (SAST)

Salt Rock is a small coastal village just north of Ballito and Shaka's Rock situated along the Dolphin Coast of KwaZulu-Natal, South Africa. It is a favorite holiday destination for many local South Africans. It is approximately located 52 kilometres (40 minutes) north-east of Durban and 19 km south-east of KwaDukuza. Salt Rock owes much of its history to Basil Hulett and his wife Gwen who started not only the Salt Rock Hotel but went on to develop the town of Salt Rock as found today.

== Geography ==
Located approximately 7 kilometres (4 mi) north of Ballito, Salt Rock lies between Sheffield Beach to the north, Shaka’s Rock to the south, Simbithi Eco Estate to the south-west and Umhlali to the west.

== Residential development ==
Over the past twenty years, there have been residential and commercial developments in the greater area of Salt Rock beyond the original village on previously sugarcane land. Developments of note include Brettenwood Coastal Estate (launched in 2004), Dunkirk Estate (launched in 2003), and New Salt Rock City (launched in 2010).

New Salt City, a precinct envisioning to be a "new city" currently includes the Mount Richmore Village Estate, New Salt Rock Shopping Centre, which launched in 2018 and a private school, Curro Salt Rock (previously Curro Mount Richmore), owned by South Africa’s largest independent school network, Curro have been built within the precinct.

== Retail ==
Salt Rock is served by two shopping centres including, New Salt Rock Shopping Centre in the New Salt Rock City development and Tiffany’s Centre at the corner between the N2 and Salt Rock Road.

== Culture and contemporary life ==
=== Fishing ===
There are plenty of fishing spots along the coast from Salt Rock, through Shaka's Rock to Ballito and Salmon Bay as well as reefs offshore. Nightlife in the village is limited with a handful of pubs and restaurants offering a variety of food and drinks.

=== Tourism ===
Salt Rock Beach is the main beach within Salt Rock which has a nearby large tidal pool, which was originally built for guests staying at the hotel. Furthermore the main beach has lifeguards on duty, shark protected and a surfing site.

== Infrastructure ==
=== Roads ===
Salt Rock lies just off the N2 toll freeway passing from KwaDukuza in the north to Durban in the south. The area is also accessed via Salt Rock Road from Umhlali in the west, also providing access to the N2 and Ocean Drive from Shaka’s Rock and Ballito in the south.
