= Stanger Manor Secondary School =

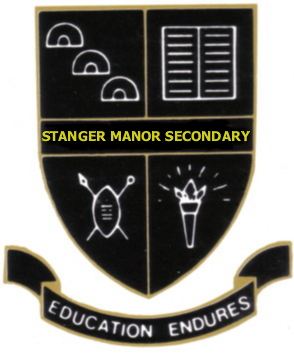
- Education Endures

Location
- 1 School Road; Stanger Manor; KwaDukuza / Stanger; South Africa; 29°19′20″S 31°16′42″E

Information
- Type: High School
- Motto: Education Endures
- Established: 1980
- School district: iLembe
- Headmaster: H.Naidoo
- Grades: 8–12
- Enrollment: 1,300
- Colours: Gold and Black

Stanger Manor Secondary School is a public high school located in Stanger, KwaDukuza, on the north coast of South Africa.

== Academic history ==
Stanger Manor Secondary opened in 1980. The first batch of matriculants sat for the Senior Certificate Examination in December 1983 with an 82% pass rate. The percentage pass rate progressively improved to 97.5% in 1987.

During the 1990s, the school celebrated 10 years since it first opened; the occasion was marked by a celebration day. In these 10 years the school has also produced athletes: the physical facilities at the school have undergone renovations over the years, including a double tennis court, a double cricket net, a basketball/volleyball court, and a swimming pool.

In 2005, the school celebrated 25 years since it first opened.

In 2007, five students from the school were among the top 10 in the Ilembe region with the top five learners averaging close to a 100% aggregate. The class of 2007's performance won the school a sponsorship from The Anglo American Mathematics Trust, which paid for a state-of-the-art mathematics centre, completed in 2009. The school allows other schools in the district to make use of it.

In 2008, the school was again one of the best performing schools under the new curriculum statement, and the learners again featured in the top achievers among the Ilembe region, featuring 3rd, 4th and fifth, with the school gaining special praise from the department of education officials.

In 2011 the school once again achieved the top 5 Matrics in the Ilembe region. In 2012 the schools Matrics achieved the second, third, and fourth positions in the Ilembe region. The matric class of 2018 brought accolades to the school. The school achieved first, third, fifth and eight position in the Ilembe district.

== Sport ==
The school has a tennis court, netball field, football field, volleyball field, and swimming pool. The school does especially well in cricket and its sport achievements feature in local newspapers. Students have been selected to represent Natal and South Africa in their respective sporting categories.

== Management ==
The school operates on a five-day, six-period cycle, which is adjusted only to address specific contextual factors, such as staff attrition and other operational needs.

== Curriculum ==
All lessons are conducted in English (Except for lessons in the Additional Languages). Each learner throughout the school (grades 8-12) are required to learn a minimum of 7 different subjects, most of which are compulsory. A learner in the higher grades (10-12) may choose additional extra subjects (up to 3) which are not part of the chosen course. Learners may either choose Afrikaans or Zulu as their 1st additional language.

The grade 8 and 9 subjects are a set list of:

English (Language, literature and writing), Mathematics, Afrikaans or Zulu (Language, literature and writing), Life Orientation, Technology, Social Sciences, Natural Sciences and Creative Arts

The higher grade (10-12) subjects are chosen by a course selection or by high number of subject requests. Subjects are:

Compulsory: English (Language, literature and writing), Afrikaans or Zulu (Language, literature and writing), Mathematics or Mathematics literacy and Life Orientation.

Student Selections: Physical Science, Life Science, Accounting, Information Technology, Engineering Graphics and Design, Geography, Travel and Tourism and Consumer Studies.

The school has over forty classrooms and specialised rooms include the Science Lab, Biology Lab, Consumer Studies room, Library, I.T. (Computer) room, Mathematics Center and two Engineering Graphics and Design rooms.

The five major blocks in the school are the Junior Block, the Senior Block, Science Block, Heads of Department (H.O.D.) Block and Technical Drawing (T.D.) Block.

In 2012/2013 the Department of Education (South Africa) announced that all South African schools will now follow the Curriculum Assessment Policy Statements (CAPS) curriculum.
