= Shaka's Rock =

- Location within KwaZulu-Natal Location within South Africa
- Coordinates: 29°30′49″S 31°13′50″E
- Country: South Africa
- Province: KwaZulu-Natal
- District: iLembe
- Municipality: KwaDukuza

Area
  - Total: 0.80 km^{2} (0.31 sq mi)

Population (2011)
  - Total: 658
  - Density: 820/km^{2} (2,100/sq mi)

Racial makeup (2011)
  - Black African: 19.0%
  - Coloured: 0.2%
  - Indian/Asian: 2.7%
  - White: 77.8%
  - Other: 0.3%

First languages (2011)
  - English: 68.1%
  - Afrikaans: 14.9%
  - Zulu: 11.9%
  - Other: 5.0%
- Time zone: UTC+2 (SAST)

Shaka's Rock is a beachside town situated along the North Coast of KwaZulu-Natal, South Africa.

Shaka's Rock is a small residential village 40 km (25 mi) from Durban. Its name comes from a promontory over which the Zulu chief Shaka is said to have thrown his enemies and to have tested his men by daring them to jump to their deaths.

Shaka's Rock is a popular holiday destination, situated between Salt Rock and Ballito on the Dolphin Coast. Shaka's Rock Beach Tidal Pool is protected and well known for snorkelling, with a wide variety of fish, corals and other sealife.

== Infrastructure ==
=== Roads ===
Shaka’s Rock lies just off the N2 (North Coast Toll Road) between Durban to the south and KwaDukuza to the north, with an interchange at Shaka’s Rock Road between Shaka’s Rock and Shaka’s Head.

Shaka’s Rock is also located at the junction of Ocean Drive and Shaka’s Rock Road. Ocean Drive runs between Salt Rock and Ballito and serves as the main coastal road of Shaka’s Rock while Shaka’s Rock Road runs inland from Ocean Drive towards Shaka’s Head.
