= Elijah 'Tap Tap' Makhatini =

South African boxer

Elijah 'Tap Tap' Makhatini (born 3 October 1942) is a retired South African middleweight boxer.

Makhatini was born in Eshowe in Zululand in 1942, he started his boxing career in Stanger, Natal in the 1970s.

On 17 August 1974 Makhatini fought in South Africa's first multiracial boxing tournament, which was held at the Rand Stadium in Johannesburg and was promoted by Maurice Toweel. Makhatini fought Juarez de Lima of Brazil and Makhatini won on points.

In 1975 Makhatini faced Emile Griffith the U.S. Virgin Islands boxer in the Orlando Stadium in Soweto and beat him on points.

He was awarded the Order of Ikhamanga in silver for boxing.
