= Dianne Stewart (author) =

South African author (born 1952)

Dianne Stewart (born 4 March 1952) is a South African author who has published over 40 books for adults and for children. She writes in English, and her books have been translated both into African languages, including Xhosa, Zulu, Sotho, and Afrikaans, and European languages, including French, Spanish, and Swedish.

Stewart's African folklore books include Daughter of the Moonlight and Other African Tales (1997), The Zebra's Stripes and Other African Animal Tales (2004), African Myths and Legends (2014), Folktales From Africa (2015), and The Guineafowl's Spots and Other African Bird Tales (2018). She has also published a book of African proverbs entitled Wisdom from Africa (2013), a book dedicated to Anthony Davey, her isiXhosa professor at Rhodes University. These folklore publications have made Stewart a "household name" in the publishing of African folktales for English-speaking South African audiences.

Stewart's book The Gift of the Sun: A Tale from South Africa (1996), with illustrations by Jude Daly, won the Smithsonian Notable Books for Children award in 1996.

Stewart graduated from Rhodes University in 1973 with degrees in Psychology and isiXhosa, and she later taught isiXhosa; Stewart's mother is a fluent Xhosa speaker. For her M.A. degree in African Languages at the University of Natal, Stewart studied the Zulu and Xhosa work-songs of rural woman on sugar-cane farms on the KwaZulu-Natal coast. Stewart also has an M.A. in creative writing from the University of Cape Town.

Stewart resides in Ballito, South Africa, and she grew up in the Eastern Cape.
