= Stanger Secondary School =

- School Monogram

Location
- Cnr Elizabeth and Grammar Street; KwaDukuza / Stanger; South Africa
- 29°20′00.5″S 31°17′19.3″E

Information
- Type: High School
- Motto: Semper Sursum
- Established: 3 August 1920
- School district: Ilembe
- Headmaster: B A Mhlongo
- Grades: 8–12
- Enrollment: +/-1160
- Colours: Blue and White

Stanger Secondary School is a public high school located in Stanger / KwaDukuza on the north coast of Kwazulu Natal in South Africa.

== History ==
The school was officially opened on 3 August 1920 and historically catered for the Indian community during apartheid. The school was referred to as "Stanger State Indian High School" during the Apartheid era.

== Learners ==
The school caters for learners from a vast range of communities. Feeder schools are mainly Kwadukuza Primary (located directly opposite Stanger Secondary), Dawnview Primary and Ashram Primary. About 70% of the learners come from historically disadvantaged backgrounds. An ex-learner of notable reference is former national education minister Kader Asmal.

== International Link ==
Since 2004 Stanger Secondary School has been part of a "twinning agreement" with two schools in the United Kingdom - Cornwallis School and Beauchamp College. This link has yielded many benefits. Key examples of benefits include books, computers and skills. Internet connectivity was established in 2005 and, for the first time, an email was sent from within the school.

== Fundanami Learning Centre ==
One of the most significant benefits Stanger Secondary has gained from the twinning agreement is the construction of a state-of-the-art Learning Centre at the heart of the school. This centre was named "Fundanami" by the learners of the school. "Fundanami" is an Isizulu word meaning "Learn With Me". Construction began in May 2008 and completed in November 2008. The Centre was officially opened on 19 March 2009 in a function graced by many local representatives in education as well as the Kwazulu Natal Minister of Education, Ina Cronje. The Centre's first manager was Mrs E. Hendricks. The centre aims to be a multimedia and literacy hub. Literacy, being a major problem in the school, is tackled by means of a Reading Assistance Programme. Since the start of 2009, reading assists were employed by the Fundanami Trust to assist Grade 8 learners who possess a very low reading age. The learners are identified by means of a Reading Test conducted early in the academic year. Learners who progress in their reading age are rewarded with a Participation Certificate. The first two certificates were presented at the centre's official opening on 19 March 2009 by Mike Wood of the Fundanami Trust. In addition to the Reading Programme, the centre is also utilized for a period called "Special English" (for Grades 8 to 12) - basically a Library Period where learners are encouraged to borrow books and read.

== Curriculum ==
All lessons are conducted in English (except for lessons in the Additional Languages),

Grades 8 and 9 cover the standard GET phase subjects:

- LLC English
- LLC Afrikaans or Isizulu
- Mathematics
- Natural Sciences (Combined Physical Science and Life Science)
- Social Sciences (Combined Geography and History)
- Life Orientation
- Creative Arts
- Economic and Management Sciences (Combined Accounting and Business Studies)
- Technology
- In addition, Grades 8s and 9s are trained in basic computer skills in a non-examined subject called Computer Literacy.

Grades 10, 11, 12 cover standard CAPS subjects ranging from sciences (Physics, Life Sciences) to vocational subjects like Tourism and Consumer Studies.

In 2013, the school re-introduced Information Technology into its curriculum.

English, Afrikaans OR Isizulu, Life Orientation and Mathematics OR Mathematical Literacy are compulsory. The learner chooses three elective subjects.
