= Ballito =

- Town
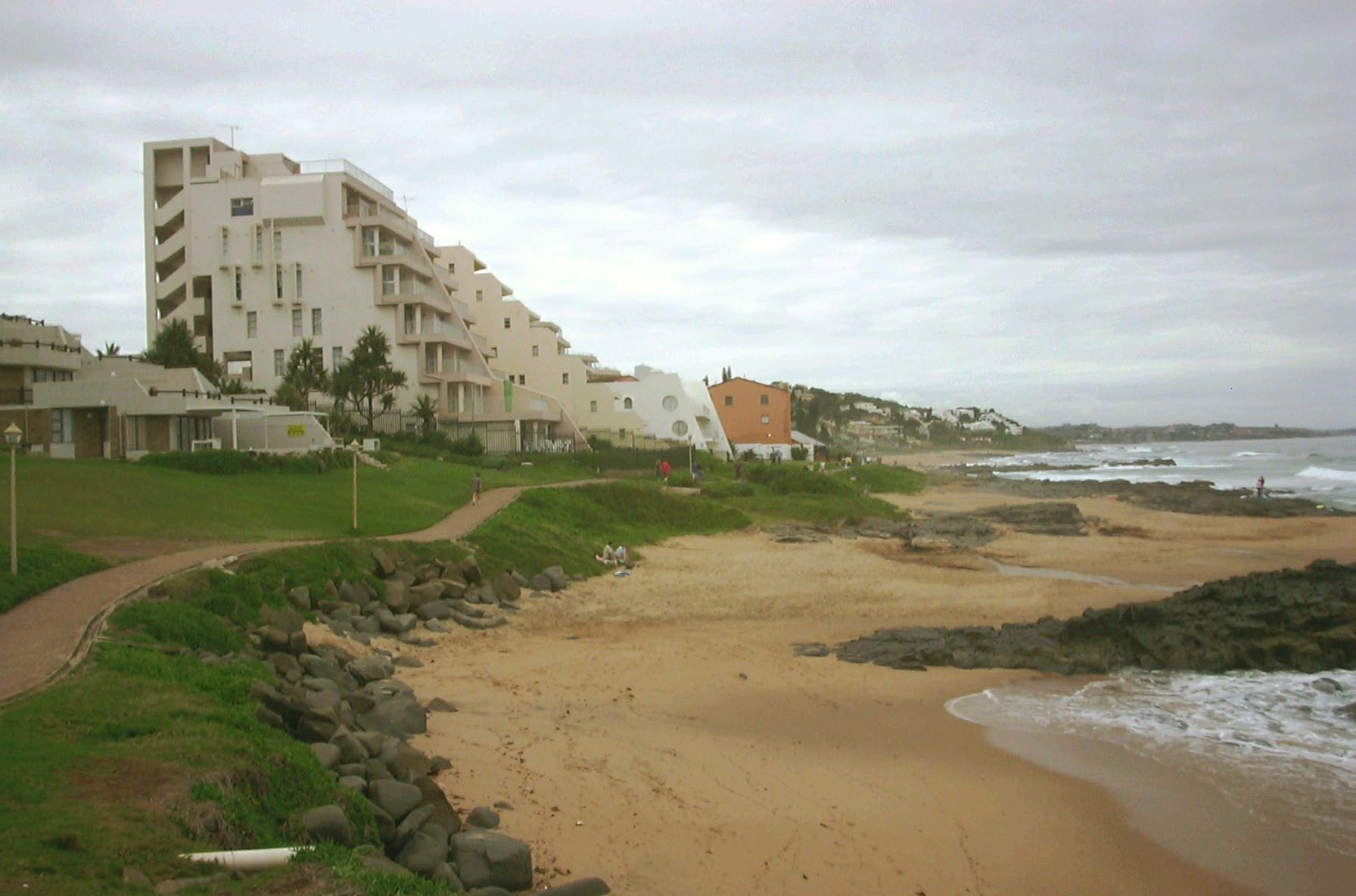
- Ballito Beach, 2004

- Location within KwaZulu-Natal Location within South Africa Location within Africa
- Coordinates: 29°32′S 31°13′E
- Country: South Africa
- Province: KwaZulu-Natal
- District: iLembe
- Municipality: KwaDukuza

Area
  - Total: 22.16 km^{2} (8.56 sq mi)

Population (2011)
  - Total: 19,234
  - Density: 868.0/km^{2} (2,248/sq mi)

Racial makeup (2011)
  - Black African: 50.6%
  - Coloured: 1.2%
  - Indian/Asian: 5.7%
  - White: 42.0%
  - Other: 0.4%

First languages (2011)
  - English: 42.7%
  - Zulu: 27.1%
  - Xhosa: 14.9%
  - Afrikaans: 9.3%
  - Other: 6.0%
- Time zone: UTC+2 (SAST)
- Postal code (street): 4420
- PO box: 4420
- Area code: 032

Ballito is an affluent coastal town located in KwaZulu-Natal, South Africa. Ballito is about 40 kilometres (25 mi) north of Durban and 24 kilometres (15 mi) south of KwaDukuza. It forms part of the KwaDukuza Local Municipality, and iLembe District Municipality. Dolphins and Whales are common on this stretch of the North Coast shoreline, hence the nickname Dolphin Coast.

Prior to 1 December 2023, vehicle registration plates in Ballito started with NT - N for Natal, T for Lower Tugela, a river that lies about 45 kilometres to the north.

== History ==
Ballito was established in 1954 as a private township, by the Glen Anil Development Corporation/Investments which was headed up by Dr Edward (Eddie) Rubenstein (1903–1972). The town's name was borrowed from a glossy advert for Ballito hosiery made by Ballito Hosiery Limited of St. Albans, England.

The name was mistakenly thought to mean "little ball" in Italian (this would be "pallina"). The name Ballito was derived from the Ballington suburb of Nashville, USA, where the parent company's first factory was.

The area was originally portion of a sugar cane farm at Compensation Beach, owned by Basil Townsend.

In 1954, the Sunday Tribune printed an advertisement for Ballito Bay, which invited potential investors to the North Coast with prices of land from R790.00 (£SA395). By 1964, the zonings for Ballitoville's residential buildings, hotels and a caravan park had already been incorporated into the town plan known as Compensation Beach, which stretched out from Willard Beach to Clark Bay, Salmon Bay and Port Zimbali.

A brochure was published, including the first marketing pictures of Ballito, with the aim of attracting holiday makers to invest in the area, incorporating the slogan "Buy, Build & Play at Ballito Bay, The Caribbean of the North Coast – Natal". Ballito, Salt Rock and Shaka's Rock are favourite holiday destinations for local South Africans, and also foreign tourists on their way to Zululand and the historic Anglo-Zulu War battlefields.

Jack Nash (1914–2016) wrote a personal history, from the early beginning of Ballito through to 1986, after which he left the area. It includes descriptions of some of the early pioneers and characters of the town. They include his father-in-law, Reg Fripp, who built many of the early houses. Nash, who lived in Amber Valley until shortly before his death in Howick, was the estate agent for Glen Anil in Ballito and became the chairman of the Ballito and the North Coast Publicity Associations. Nash's wife, Gaye Nash née Fripp, the young ballet dancer holding a beach ball above her head in the full-page press release publicising the new township in the Sunday Tribune of 23 November 1954, still lives in Howick.

== Geography ==
Located at the entrance to the Dolphin Coast of KwaZulu-Natal, Ballito is roughly bordered by Shaka's Rock to the north and Zimbali to the south. The region of Ballito is sub-divided into various suburbs, namely; Ballito proper, Ballitoville, Shaka's Head, Umhlali Golf and Country Estate, Port Zimbali and Zimbali Estate and it incorporates the neighbouring settlements of Shaka's Rock, Salt Rock, Umhlali, Sheffield Beach and Tinley Manor Beach.

== Infrastructure ==
=== Healthcare ===
Ballito is served by the Netcare Alberlito Hospital, owned by one of South Africa's largest private healthcare groups, Netcare. Public healthcare in Ballito is offered at the Ballito Clinic, which falls under the jurisdiction of the General Justice Gizenga Mpanza Regional Hospital (previously Stanger Provincial Hospital) in KwaDukuza.

=== Transport ===
The N2 (North Coast Toll Road) is the main freeway passing Ballito from KwaDukuza in the north to Durban in the south, with off-ramps at Ballito Drive. The R102 runs north–south, bypassing Ballito from Umhlali in the north to oThongathi in the south. The coastal M4 runs north–south from Ballito to uMhlanga (passes through Ballito as Ballito Drive and Leo Boyd Highway). Both the R102 and M4 are the untolled alternative routes to the N2 northbound and southbound.

== Tourism ==
Today Ballito is a community with ties to primary and high schools in and around Ballito, uMhlanga, KwaDukuza (Stanger) and oThongathi (Tongaat). Ballito has grown in recent times and has three shopping malls, Ballito Lifestyle Centre, The Odyssey, and Ballito Junction Regional Shopping Centre.

Ballito has a strong tourism economy, home to a number of family adventure attractions such as the crocodile farm and microlight flights and tours. It is a holiday destination with hotels and self-catering accommodation, swimming (Willard) and surfing beaches (Boulder). A promenade about 2.5 kilometres (1.6 mi) long along the beach front allows for walking and jogging. The Gunston 500 surfing contest, renamed Ballito Pro sponsored by Billabong, has been shifted from the Bay of Plenty in Durban's Golden Mile to Ballito where it is held annually in July.

There are four beaches along the Ballito stretch of beach including the main beach, Willard Beach as well as Salmon Bay Beach (non-swimming), Clarke Bay Beach and Thompson's Bay Beach. Further north up the coast are the beaches of Salt Rock, Sheffield Beach and Tinley Manor.

== Economy ==
=== Business sector ===
Ballito's business sector has also grown significantly with a large commercial business park bordering the N2 freeway. With a full service industry within the commercial business park, Ballito now caters to a growing business community on the North Coast. Enterprise iLembe, the region's investment arm, has been formed to develop Ballito and the iLembe area as an investment destination of choice. The development of the King Shaka International Airport and Dube TradePort to the south have also contributed significantly to the growth of Ballito.

=== Retail ===
The recent investments in Ballito have positioned the town as the main retail hub along the North Coast of KwaZulu-Natal, servicing the coastal region with a wide variety of shopping centres, motor dealerships and other retail amenities.

Ballito is mainly served by the Ballito Junction Regional Mall, the second largest shopping centre north of Durban after the Gateway Theatre of Shopping in uMhlanga. Smaller shopping centres in the vicinity of Ballito include Ballito Lifestyle Centre, New Salt Rock Shopping Centre and Tiffany's Shopping Centre.

== Growth ==
In recent years, there has been a population boom in Ballito. Various secure or gated estates, the largest being Zimbali Estate followed by Simbithi, have been built in and around the town on land that was previously used as sugar cane farms. Many new hotels and resorts have opened, drawing even more tourists into this picturesque part of the KwaZulu-Natal coast. Plans are currently on the table for new schools to be constructed, a new town centre, a taxi rank, and a larger clinic. The main entrance to Ballito from the N2 highway has been upgraded, with the construction of an multi level interchange to ease traffic, the widening of the road to four lanes in Ballito Drive, and proper pedestrian walkways.

Today Ballito and its neighbours, Shaka's Rock, Salt Rock and Sheffield Beach have virtually merged into one long strip of seaside towns. The Greater Ballito area also includes the nearby settlements of Umhlali, Shakaskraal and Tinley Manor Beach.

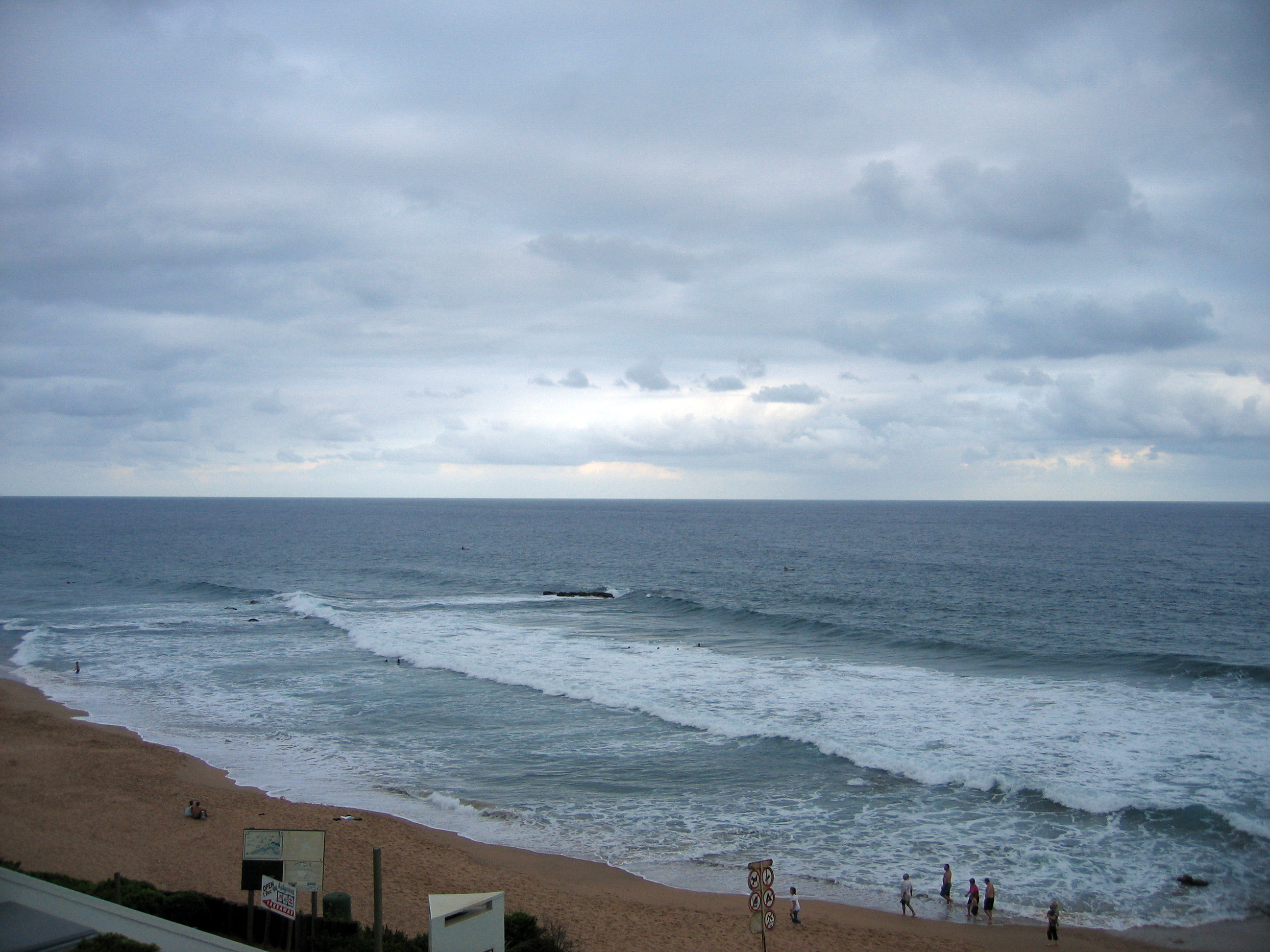
Ballito beach view, 2007

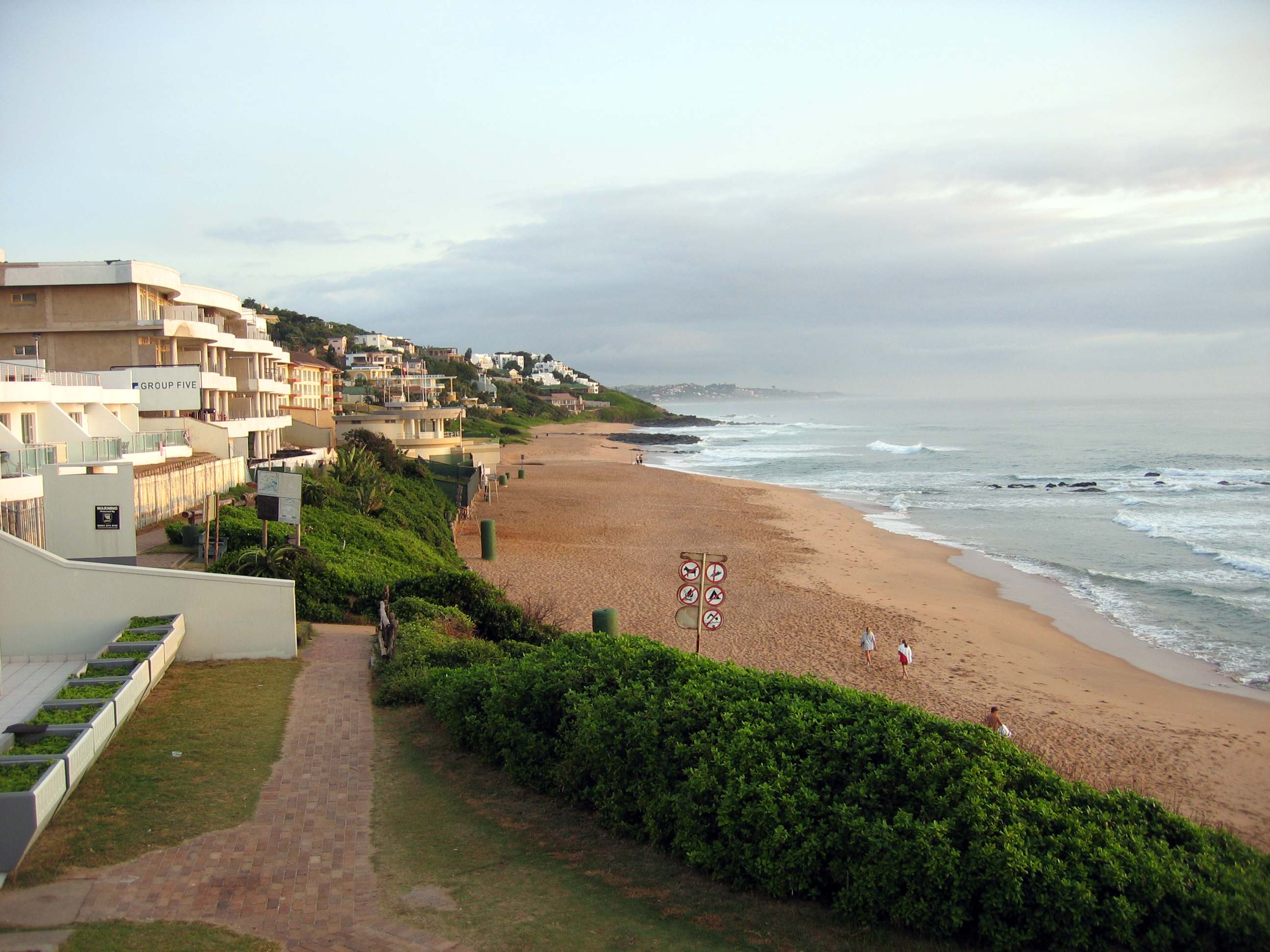
Ballito beach, 2007

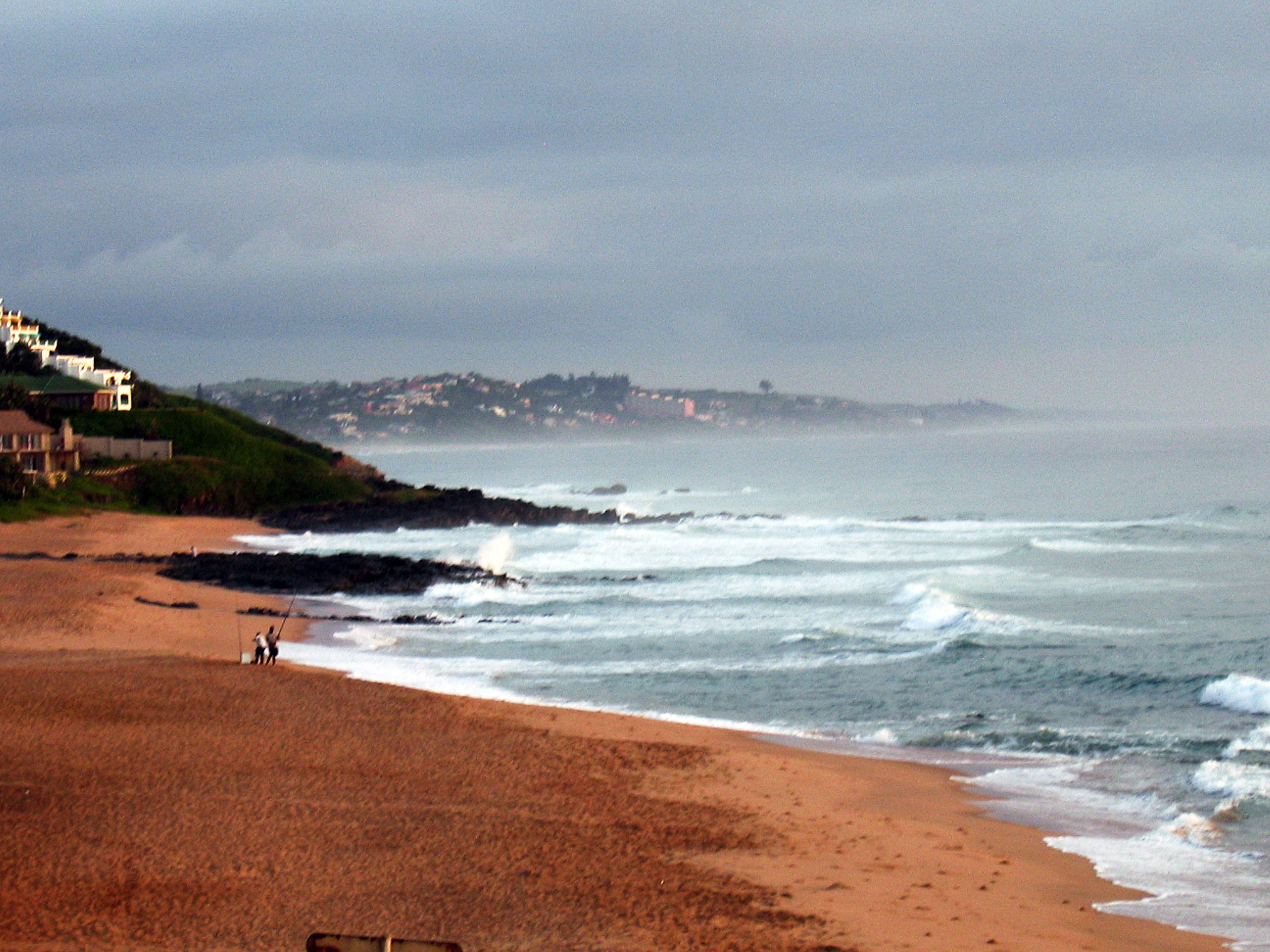
Early morning fishing, 2007

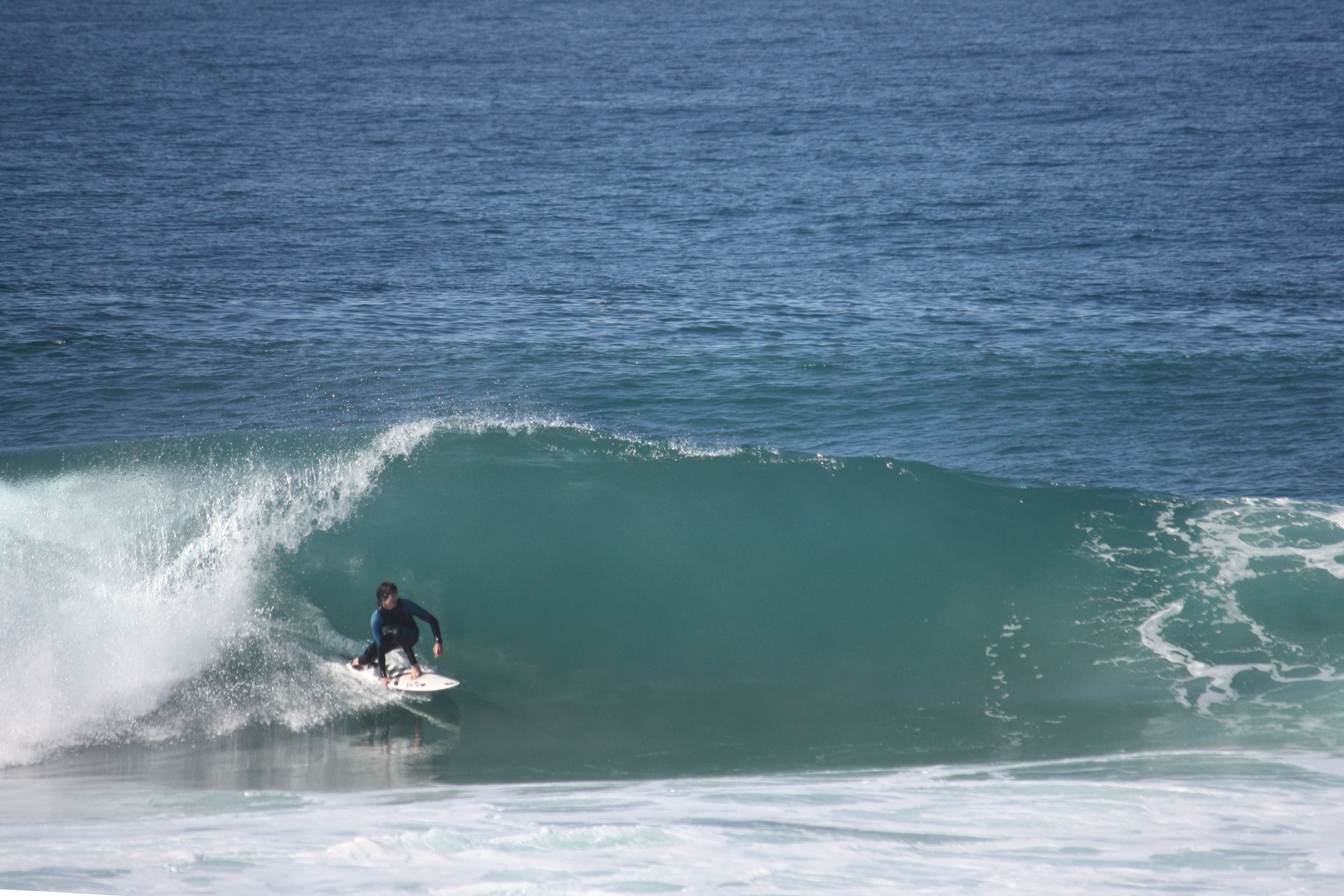
Surfer off Ballito Beach, 2011

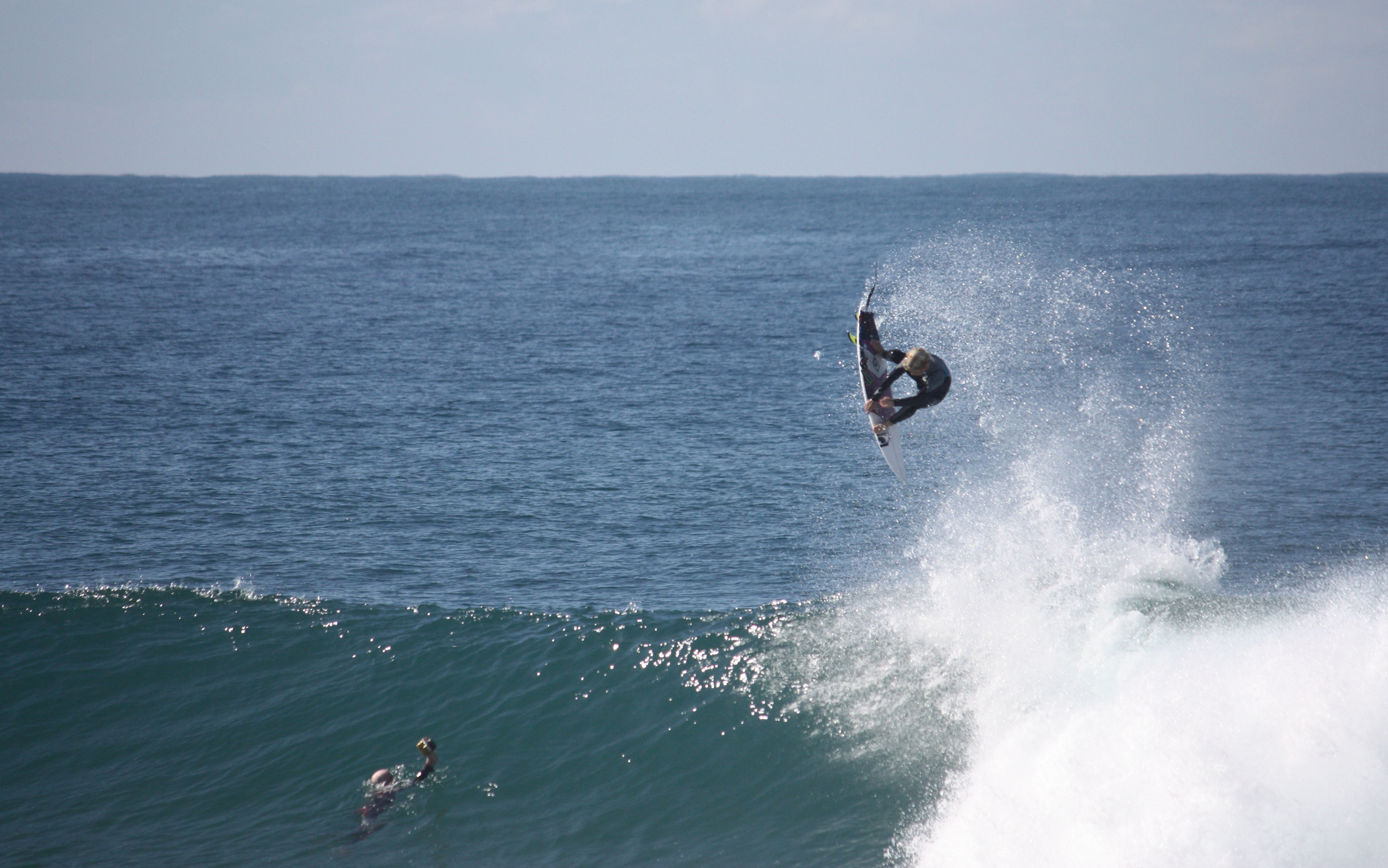
Airborne surfer off Ballito Beach, 2011

== Notable residents ==
- Max du Plessis, lawyer
- Peter Harker, bishop
- Pat Lambie, Springbok rugby player
- Patricia Lewis, singer
- Dianna Stewart, author
- Bobby van Jaarsveld, singer-songwriter
