= Darnall, KwaZulu-Natal =

Darnall
- Location within KwaZulu-Natal Location within South Africa
- Coordinates: 29°16′S 31°22′E
- Country: South Africa
- Province: KwaZulu-Natal
- District: iLembe
- Municipality: KwaDukuza

Area
  - Total: 4.60 km^{2} (1.78 sq mi)

Population (2011)
  - Total: 8,435
  - Density: 1,830/km^{2} (4,750/sq mi)

Racial makeup (2011)
  - Black African: 81.9%
  - Coloured: 0.7%
  - Indian/Asian: 15.6%
  - White: 1.6%
  - Other: 0.2%

First languages (2011)
  - Zulu: 67.1%
  - English: 18.1%
  - Xhosa: 12.1%
  - Other: 2.8%
- Time zone: UTC+2 (SAST)
- Postal code (street): 4480
- PO box: 4480
- Area code: 032

Darnall is a town in Ilembe District Municipality in the KwaZulu-Natal province of South Africa. Darnall is home to the Darnall sugar factory.
