= Zinkwazi Beach =

- Location within KwaZulu-Natal Location within South Africa
- Coordinates: 29°17′06″S 31°26′13″E
- Country: South Africa
- Province: KwaZulu-Natal
- District: iLembe
- Municipality: KwaDukuza

Area
  - Total: 1.50 km^{2} (0.58 sq mi)

Population (2011)
  - Total: 693
  - Density: 462/km^{2} (1,200/sq mi)

Racial makeup (2011)
  - Black African: 34.3%
  - Coloured: 0.1%
  - Indian/Asian: 2.0%
  - White: 62.9%
  - Other: 0.6%

First languages (2011)
  - English: 56.3%
  - Zulu: 23.3%
  - Afrikaans: 9.0%
  - Xhosa: 4.0%
  - Other: 7.4%
- Time zone: UTC+2 (SAST)

Zinkwazi Beach is a small town on the North Coast of the KwaZulu-Natal province in South Africa. It is well known for its lagoon, which is an estuary of the Zinkwazi River.
