= KwaDukuza =

KwaDukuza Stanger
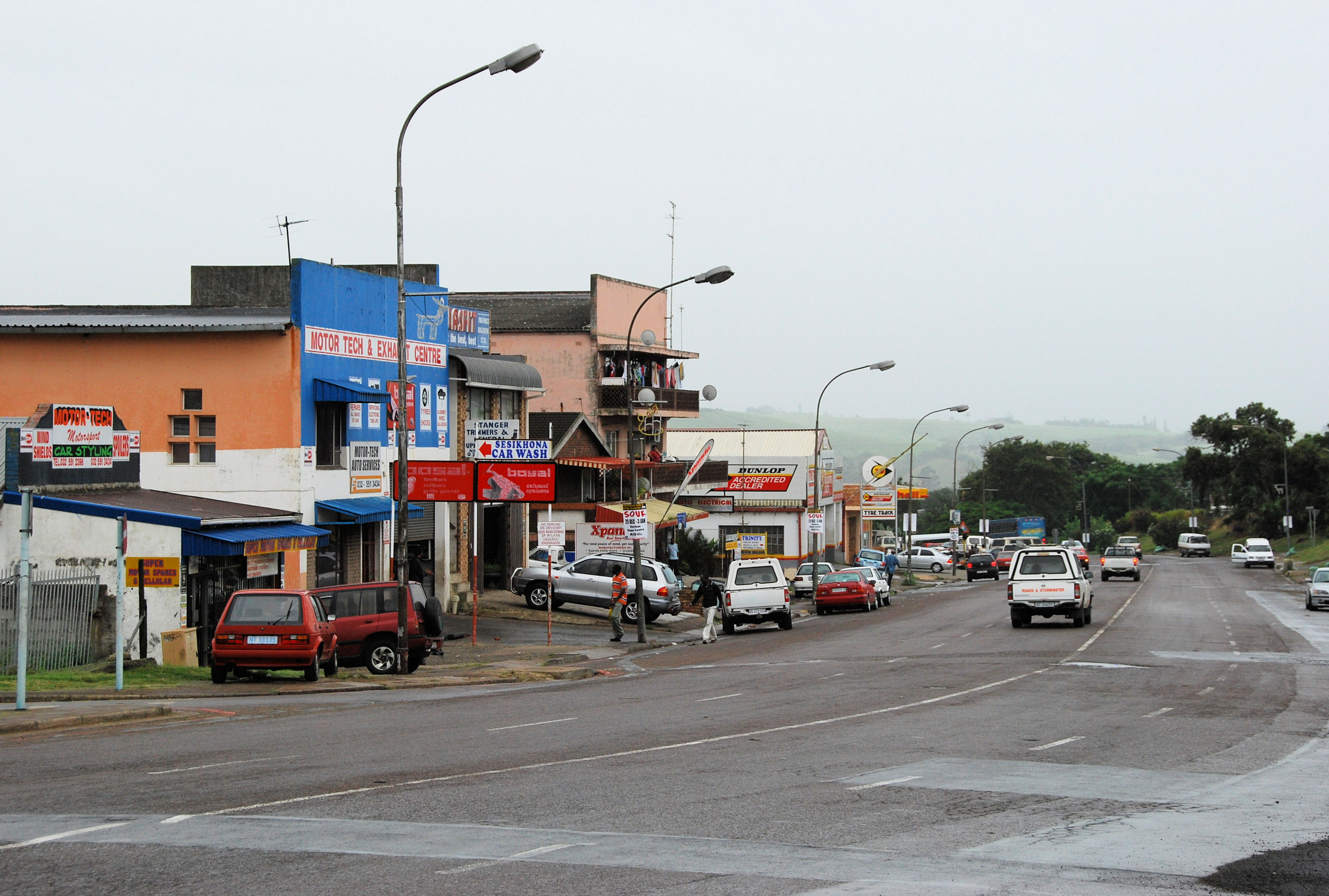
- KwaDukuza, KwaZulu-Natal

- Location within KwaZulu-Natal Location within South Africa
- Coordinates: 29°20′00″S 31°17′30″E
- Country: South Africa
- Province: KwaZulu-Natal
- District: iLembe
- Municipality: KwaDukuza
- Established: 1825 as Dukuza, 1873 as Stanger

Area
  - Total: 102.37 km^{2} (39.53 sq mi)

Population (2023)
  - Total: 101,224
  - Density: 988.81/km^{2} (2,561.0/sq mi)

Racial makeup (2011)
  - Black African: 53.0%
  - Coloured: 1.9%
  - Indian/Asian: 43.7%
  - White: 0.7%
  - Other: 0.7%

First languages (2011)
  - English: 47.7%
  - Zulu: 46.0%
  - Xhosa: 1.4%
  - Other: 4.8%
- Time zone: UTC+2 (SAST)
- Postal code (street): 4449
- PO box: 4450

KwaDukuza, previously known as Stanger, is a town in KwaZulu-Natal, South Africa. In 2006, the municipal name was changed to KwaDukuza (which incorporates towns such as Stanger, Ballito and Shakaskraal), but the Zulu people in the area called it "Dukuza" well before then.

The city has undergone minor economic construction since 2015, having built a multi-million rand regional shopping mall in 2018. KwaDukuza also has a college called North Coast Agricultural College located in Shakaskraal.

== History ==
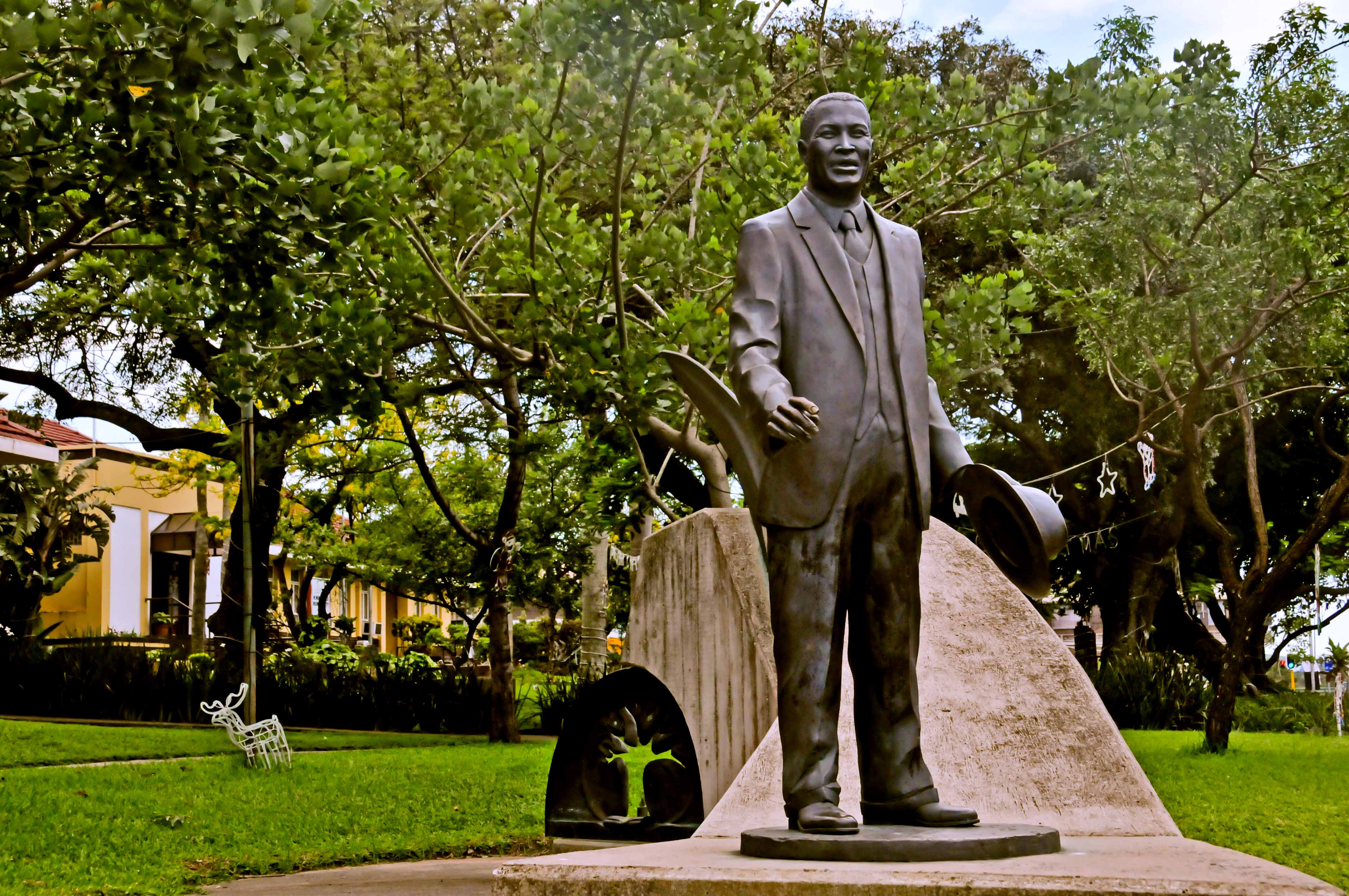
Albert Luthuli statue in KwaDukuza

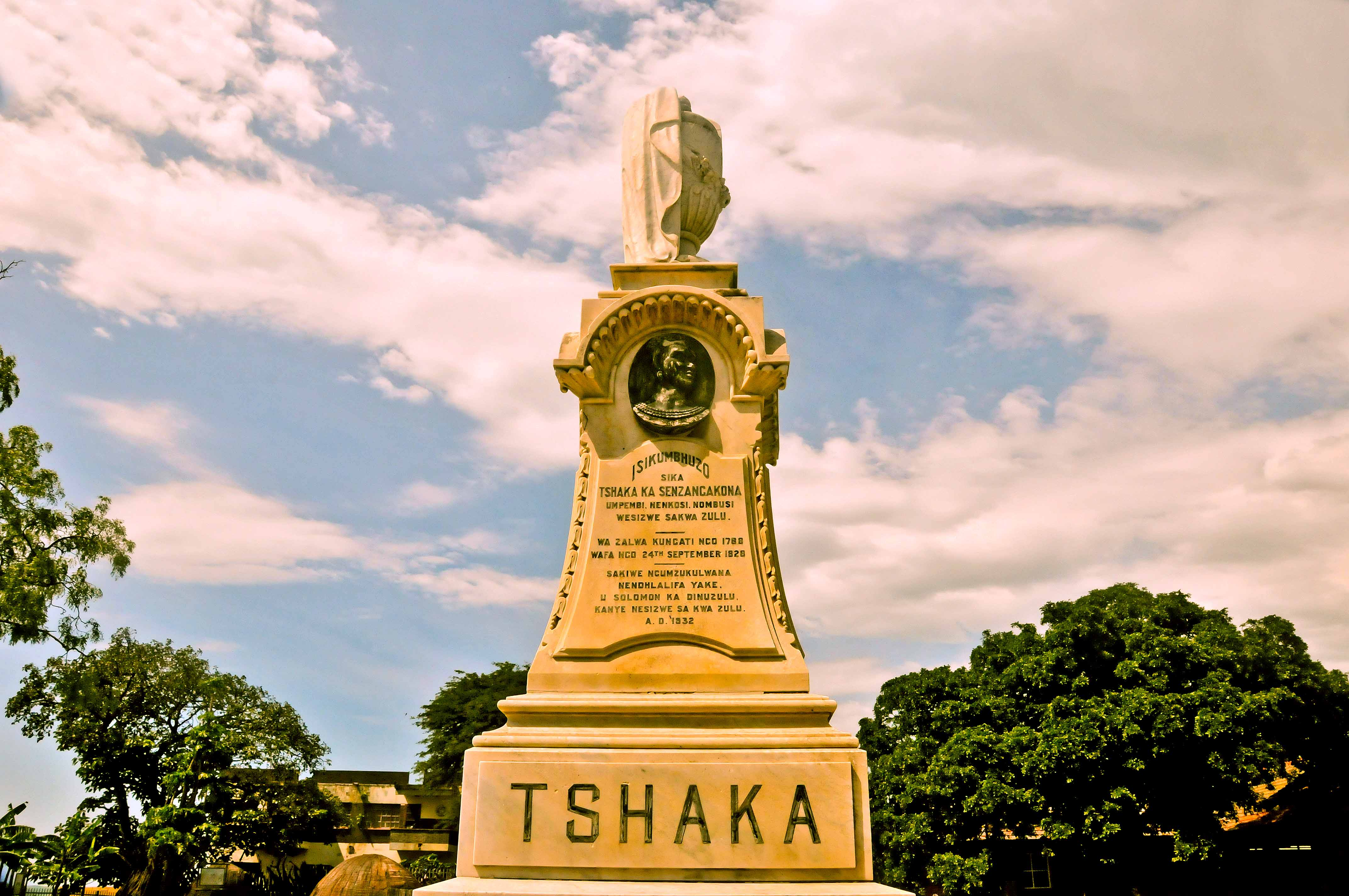
King Shaka memorial stone in KwaDukuza

The town was founded in about 1820 by King Shaka and was named KwaDukuza (Zulu: Place of the Lost Person) because of the capital's labyrinth of huts. After Shaka was assassinated on 22 September 1828 during a coup by two of his half-brothers, Dingane and Umthlangana (Mhlangane), the city was burnt to the ground. In 1873, European settlers built a town on the site, naming it Stanger after William Stanger, the surveyor-general of Natal.

Stanger became a municipality in 1949 and is the commercial, magisterial and railway centre of an important sugar-producing district. A small museum adjoins the site of Shaka's grave, a grain pit in the city centre. The city and its vibrant inhabitants are surrounded by sugar cane fields, bush and the mahogany tree where Shaka held meetings, which still stands in front of the municipal offices. The Shaka Day festival, a colourful ceremony of 10,000 or more Zulus, is held at the KwaDukuza Recreation Grounds on 24 September every year. The festival is usually attended by dignitaries to mark the significance of the Zulu nation.

In 2006, the Minister of Arts and Culture approved a name change from Stanger to KwaDukuza, which was published in the Government Gazette of South Africa on 3 March 2006.

The KwaDukuza Museum houses historical items and information on Shaka, the sugar industry and local history. The town has a South Asian influence because of the influx of labourers from India in the late 19th and the early 20th centuries for sugarcane barons, such as Liege Hulett. The first few hundred Indian families left Port Natal for the cane farms on 17 November 1860. The importation of Indian labourers was stopped in 1911, when their numbers exceeded 100,000. Most Indians did not return when their work contracts expired, but exchanged their return-trip passes for money or property. The growth of the Indian community changed the economic and cultural nature of the town and has successfully developed it into what it is today. Celebrations include Diwali and the Winter Fair, the latter being a fundraiser for child welfare.

In July 2021, the town was significantly impacted by large scale looting, vandalism, property damage and civil unrest caused during the 2021 South African unrest, much to the dismay of the Indian population.

== Law and government ==
KwaDukuza forms part of the KwaDukuza Local Municipality and the larger iLembe District Municipality, serving as the seat for both municipalities. It has a Magistrate's Court and most central and provincial government departments maintain regional branches or other offices in the town.

== Geography ==
Located on the hilly North Coast of KwaZulu-Natal, KwaDukuza lies approximately 73 km (45 mi) north-west of Durban and 106 km (67 mi) south-west of Richards Bay. Moreover, the town is situated 8 kilometres (5 miles) inland from Blythedale Beach on the Mbozamo River.

The nearest settlements to KwaDukuza other than Blythedale Beach include Darnall (12 km), Shakaskraal (16 km), Tinley Manor Beach (18 km), Zinkwazi Beach (21 km) and Ballito (30 km).

=== Suburban areas ===
- Dawnside
- Gledhow
- Glen Hills
- High Ridge
- Larkfield
- Northlands
- Shakville
- Stanger Ext 2
- Stanger Ext 3
- Stanger Ext 5
- Stanger Ext 6
- Stanger Ext 7
- Stanger Ext 8
- Stanger Ext 9
- Stanger Ext 10
- Stanger Ext 12
- Stanger Ext 14
- Stanger Ext 15
- Stanger Ext 17
- Stanger Ext 18
- Stanger Ext 19
- Stanger Ext 21
- Stanger Ext 22
- Stanger Ext 24
- Stanger Ext 25
- Stanger Ext 26
- Stanger Ext 27
- Stanger Ext 29
- Stanger Ext 31
- Stanger Ext 32
- Stanger Ext 33
- Stanger Ext 34
- Stanger Ext 35
- Townview
- Warrenton

=== Climate ===
The Köppen–Geiger climate classification system classifies the KwaDuzuka climate as humid subtropical (Cfa), with more rain in the summer.

The highest record temperature was 43 °C (109 °F) on February 3, 2008, and the lowest record temperature was 5 °C (41 °F) on June 12, 2013.

Climate data for KwaDukuza
Month	Jan	Feb	Mar	Apr	May	Jun	Jul	Aug	Sep	Oct	Nov	Dec	Year
Record high °C (°F)	40 (104)	43 (109)	41 (106)	38 (100)	39 (102)	37 (99)	35 (95)	39 (102)	43 (109)	41 (106)	41 (106)	41 (106)	43 (109)
Mean daily maximum °C (°F)	28.4 (83.1)	28.7 (83.7)	28.3 (82.9)	26.5 (79.7)	24.8 (76.6)	23.2 (73.8)	22.8 (73.0)	23.8 (74.8)	24.6 (76.3)	25.2 (77.4)	26.2 (79.2)	27.8 (82.0)	25.9 (78.5)
Daily mean °C (°F)	24.2 (75.6)	24.5 (76.1)	23.9 (75.0)	21.8 (71.2)	19.4 (66.9)	17.3 (63.1)	16.9 (62.4)	18.2 (64.8)	19.6 (67.3)	20.8 (69.4)	21.9 (71.4)	23.5 (74.3)	21.0 (69.8)
Mean daily minimum °C (°F)	20.1 (68.2)	20.4 (68.7)	19.5 (67.1)	17.1 (62.8)	14.1 (57.4)	11.5 (52.7)	11.1 (52.0)	12.6 (54.7)	14.6 (58.3)	16.4 (61.5)	17.7 (63.9)	19.3 (66.7)	16.2 (61.2)
Record low °C (°F)	16 (61)	15 (59)	15 (59)	11 (52)	6 (43)	5 (41)	6 (43)	6 (43)	5 (41)	10 (50)	7 (45)	14 (57)	5 (41)
Average precipitation mm (inches)	118 (4.6)	120 (4.7)	125 (4.9)	72 (2.8)	60 (2.4)	37 (1.5)	33 (1.3)	41 (1.6)	60 (2.4)	92 (3.6)	114 (4.5)	119 (4.7)	991 (39)
Source 1: Climate-Data.org (altitude: 60m)
Source 2: Voodoo Skies for record temperatures

== Infrastructure ==
=== Healthcare ===
KwaDukuza has of two major hospitals, General Justice Gizenga Mpanza Regional Hospital, in the city centre which serves as iLembe's largest and main public hospital and the KwaDukuza Private Hospital, on the southern outskirts of the city which was opened in February 2018. Other than hospitals, KwaDukuza has three public clinics which fall under the jurisdiction of the General Justice Gizenga Mpanza Regional Hospital, including Glenhills Clinic, to the west of the city, KwaDukuza Clinic, just south of the city centre and the Nandi Clinic, north of the city.

=== Schools ===
- Stanger Manor Secondary School
- Stanger Secondary School
- Glenhills Secondary School
- Glenhills Primary School
- Stanger M.L. Sultan Secondary School
- Stanger High School
- Dawnview Primary School
- Zakkariyya Muslim School
- Stanger Primary School
- Stanger Manor Primary School
- Stanger South Secondary School
- Tshelenkosi Secondary School
- North Coast Agricultural College
- KwaDukuza Technical College

=== Transport ===
==== Rail ====
KwaDukuza is located at the northern end of the North Coast Line, which is served by the commuter rail network, Metrorail KwaZulu-Natal and runs down south to Durban via Groutville, Shakaskraal, Umhlali, oThongathi (Tongaat), Verulam and Mount Edgecombe.

==== Roads ====
KwaDukuza lies just off the N2 highway between Empangeni and Durban. Furthermore, it is intersected by the R74, connecting the N2 to the east with Greytown to the north-west. The R102 connects the city via Groutville and Shakaskraal to oThongathi in the south and via Darnall to KwaGingindlovu in the north. Running east, a small road connects the R74 (at the interchange with the N2) with the coastal village of Blythedale Beach.

===== Tolling =====
The N2 is the main route forming the North Coast Toll Route (between eMdloti and Empangeni) which involves payment of toll: Traffic approaching KwaDukuza from the south and traffic heading south on the N2 (in the direction of Durban) must pass through the Mvoti Toll Plaza, about 10 kilometres (6 mi) south of the city. The R102 between Shakaskraal and KwaDukuza serves as an untolled alternative route to the N2 to avoid the Mvoti Toll Plaza.

== Notable residents ==
- King Shaka
- Albert Luthuli
- Kader Asmal
- Aldin Grout
- King Dingane
- Elijah 'Tap Tap' Makhatini

== See also ==
- Shaka Memorial
