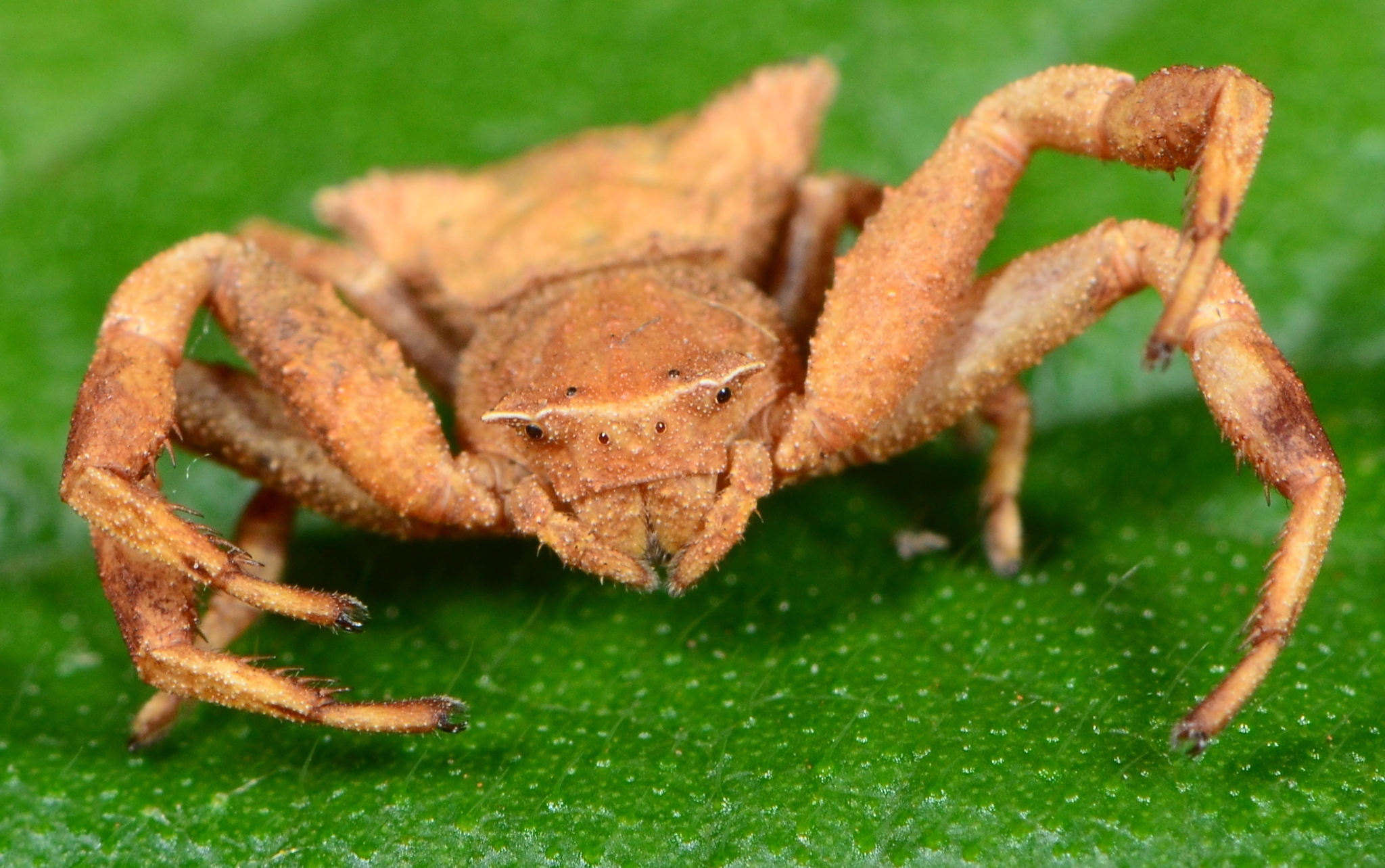
- female
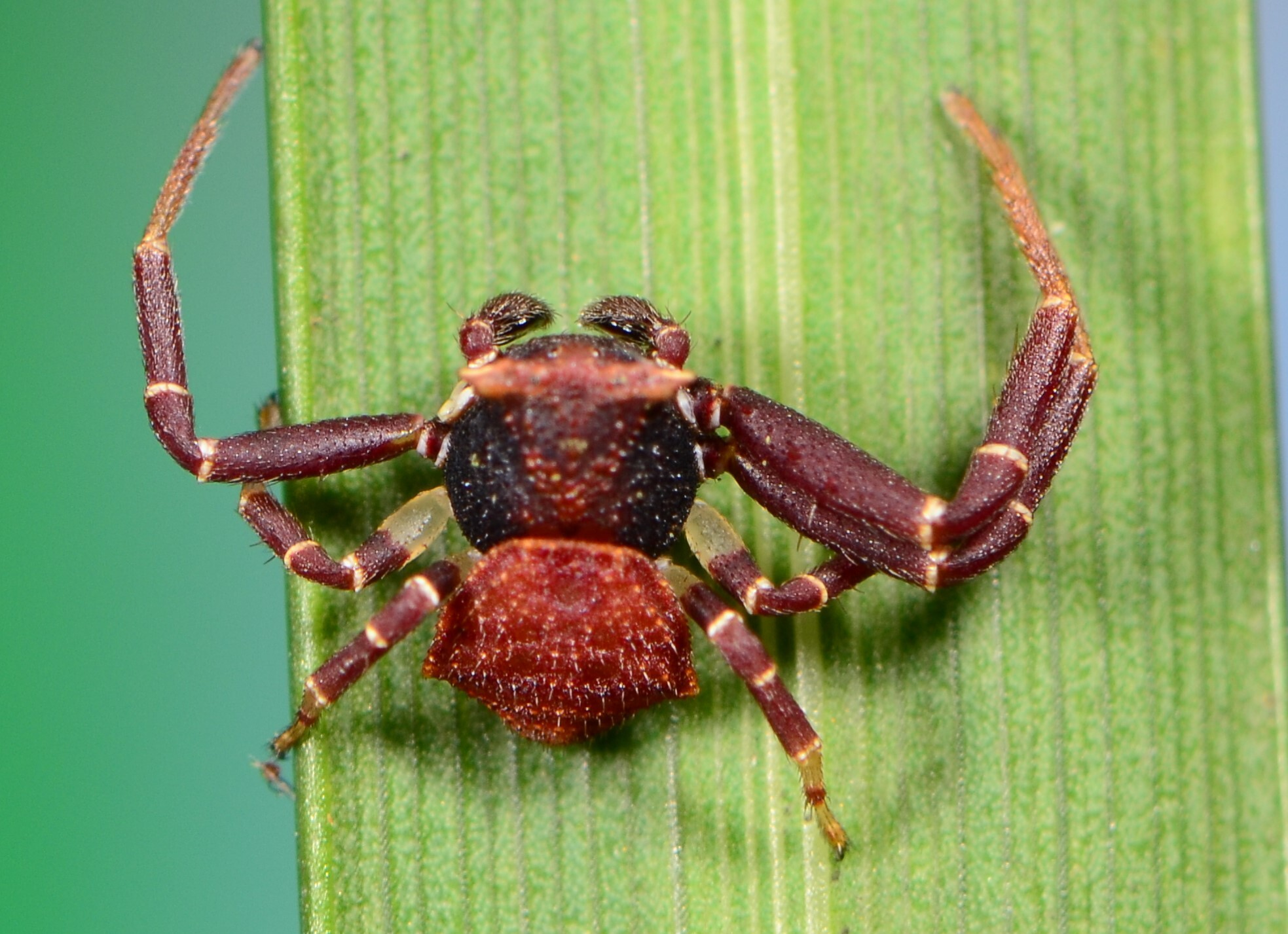
- male

Scientific classification
- Kingdom: Animalia
- Phylum: Arthropoda
- Subphylum: Chelicerata
- Class: Arachnida
- Order: Araneae
- Infraorder: Araneomorphae
- Family: Thomisidae
- Genus: Thomisus
- Species: T. scrupeus

Binomial name
- Thomisus scrupeus (Simon, 1886)

Synonyms
- Daradius scrupeus Simon, 1886; Thomisus caffer Simon, 1904; Thomisus amanicus Strand, 1907; Thomisus quadrituberculatus Lessert, 1943; Thomisus lindneri Roewer, 1956

= Thomisus scrupeus =

Brown crab spider

Species of crab spider

Thomisus scrupeus is a species of crab spider in the family Thomisidae. It is commonly known as the brown crab spider and is widely distributed throughout sub-Saharan Africa.

== Distribution ==
Thomisus scrupeus is widespread throughout sub-Saharan Africa, having been recorded from Senegal, Ivory Coast, Kenya, Malawi, Rwanda, South Africa, Tanzania, Democratic Republic of the Congo, and Zimbabwe.

In South Africa, the species has been documented across multiple provinces including the Eastern Cape, Gauteng, KwaZulu-Natal, Limpopo, Mpumalanga, and North West Province. Notable localities include various nature reserves and national parks such as Kruger National Park, Addo Elephant National Park, and Ndumo Game Reserve.

== Habitat and behaviour ==
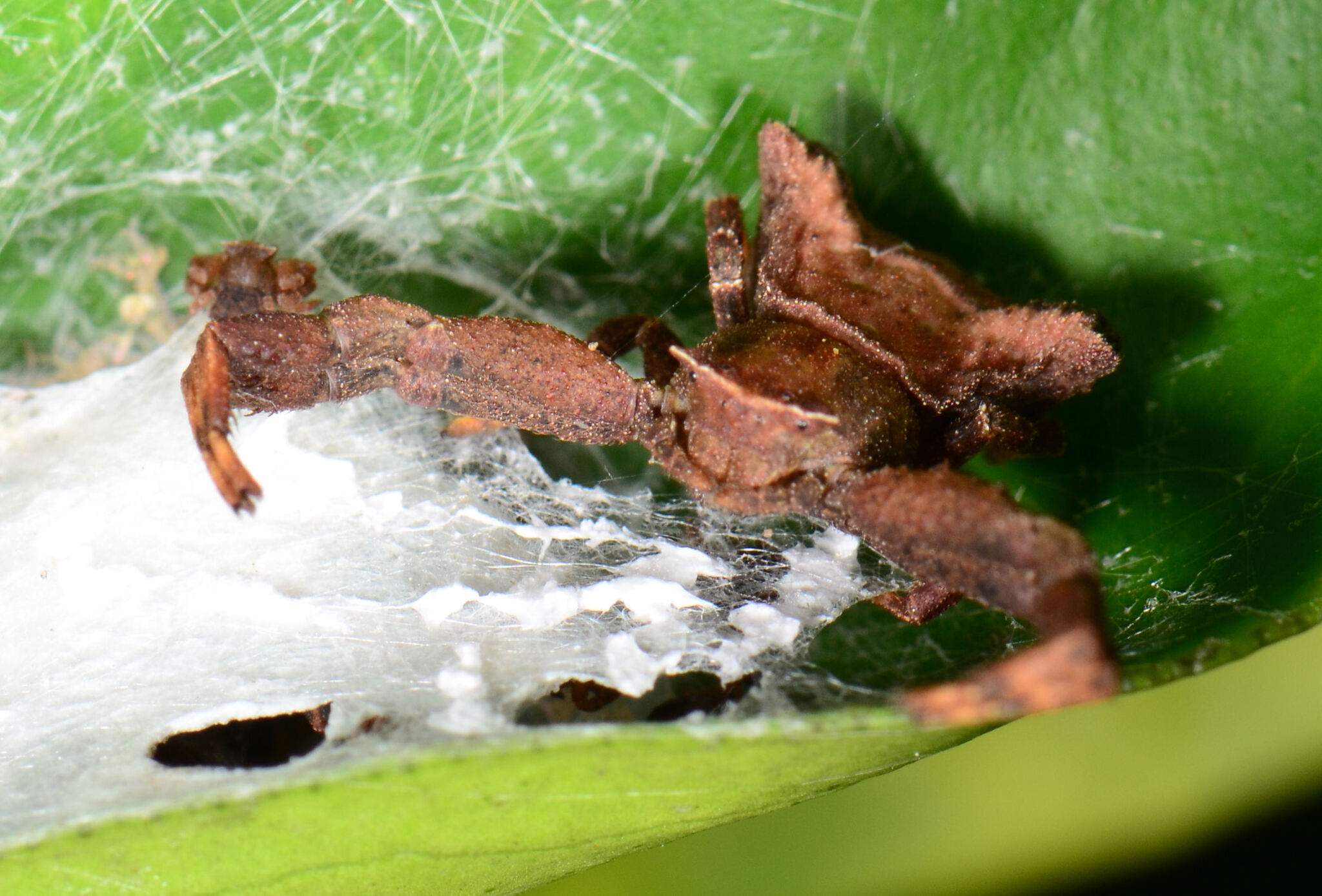
female

Thomisus scrupeus is a free-living plant dweller that appears largely restricted to the shrub and tree layer. The species is much more abundant during the summer months, with adult females collected from December to May and males from November to January.

The spiders are frequently observed holding their front legs together in a characteristic pose. Females attach white egg sacs to slightly curved leaves and remain with them until the spiderlings hatch and are strong enough to disperse.

The species has been sampled from various vegetation types including broadleaf woodland, Vachellia tortilis savanna, and V. xanthophloea forests. It has also been found in agricultural settings, including avocado and citrus orchards.

== Description ==
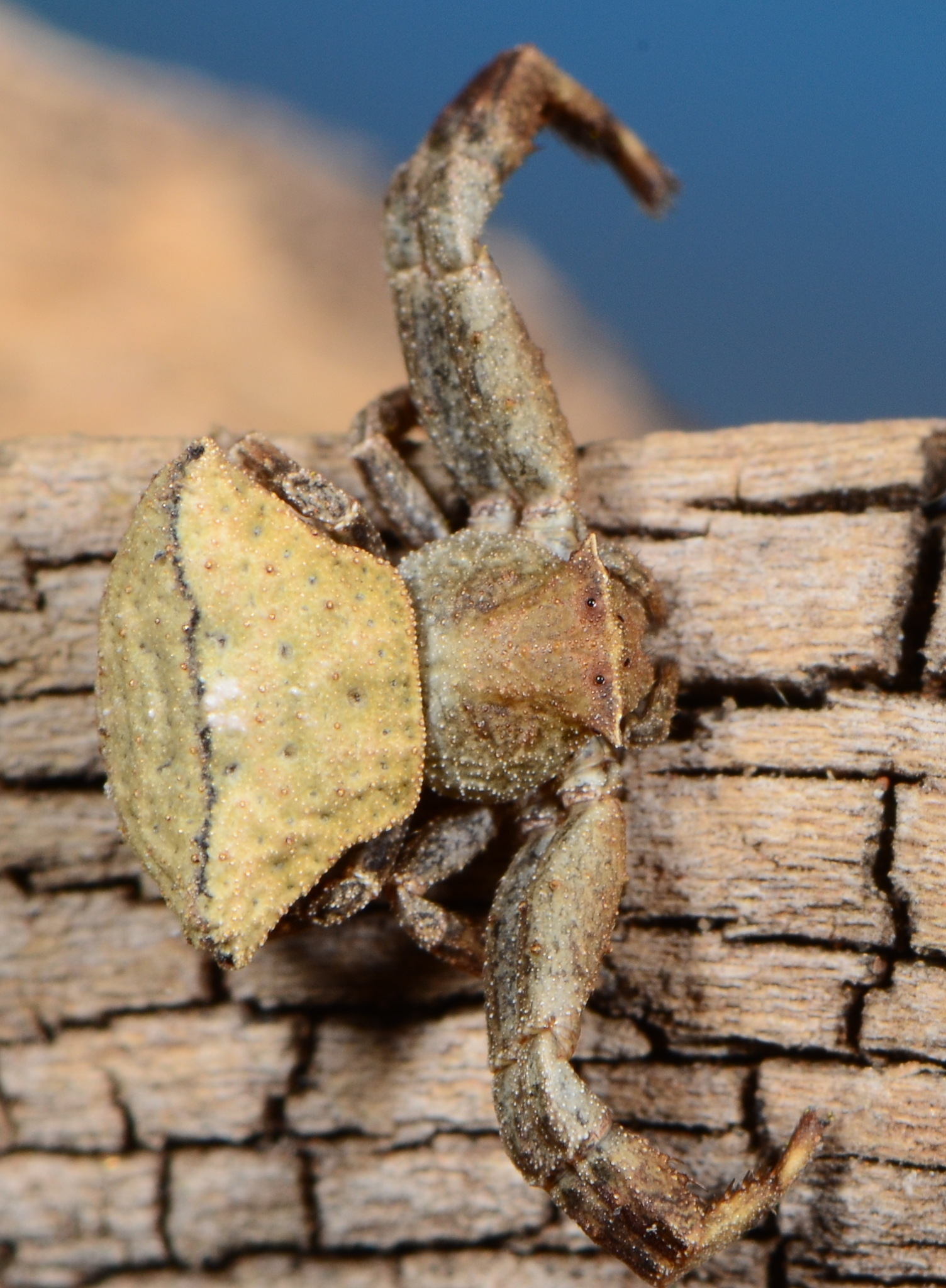
female

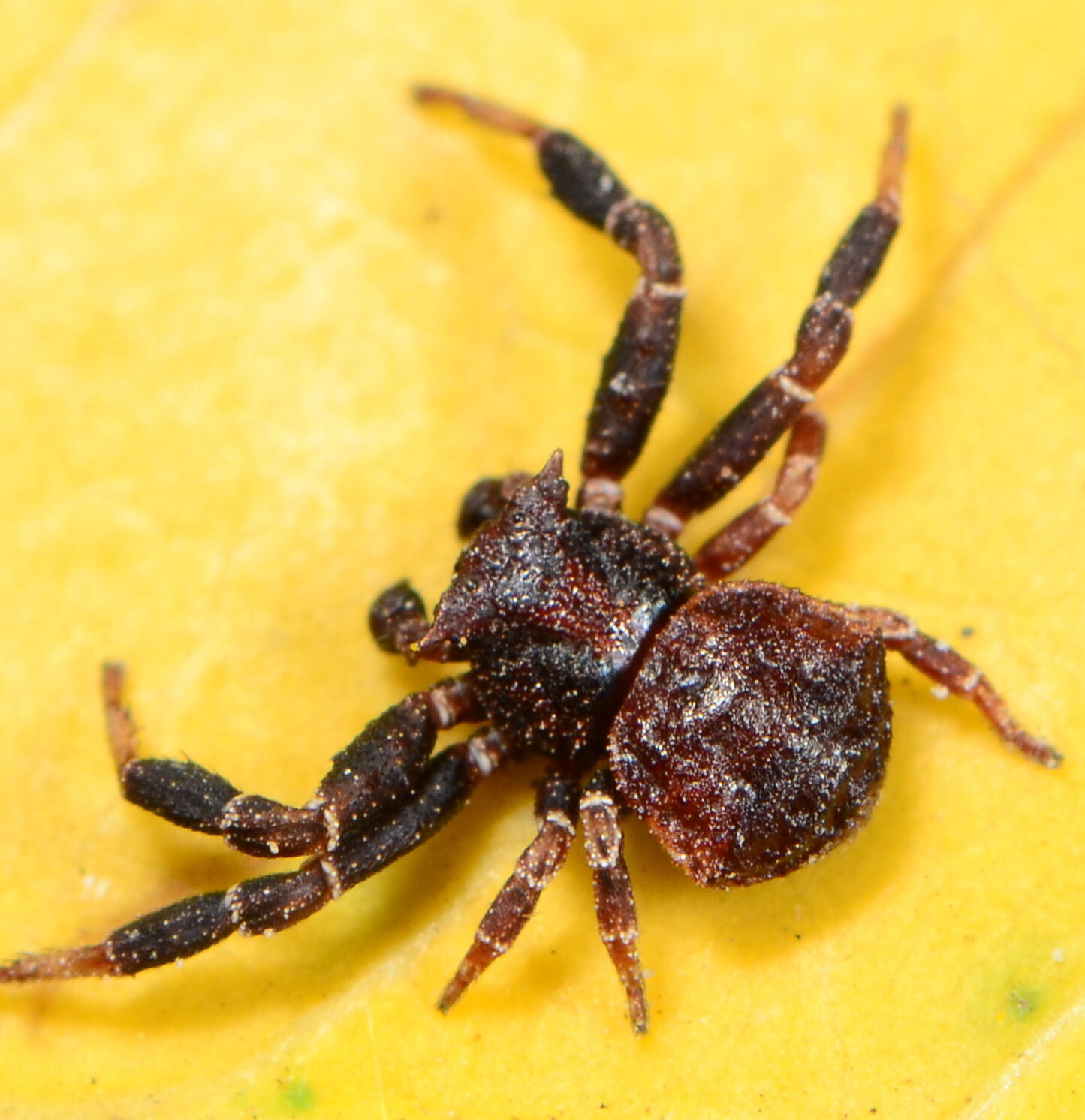
male

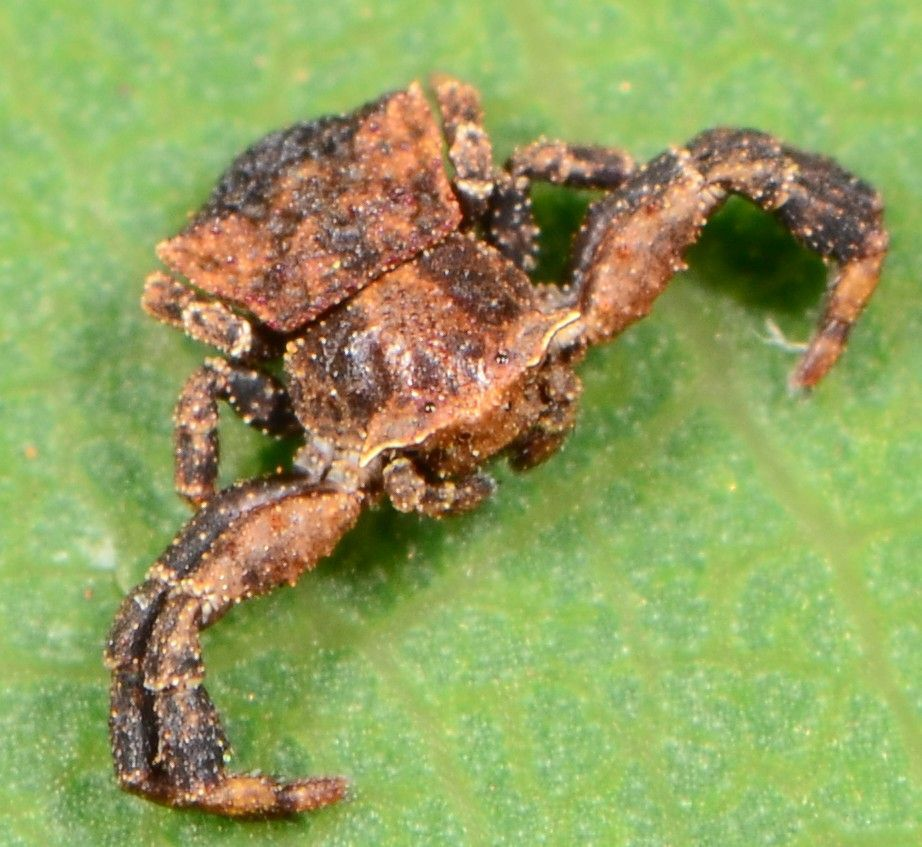
male

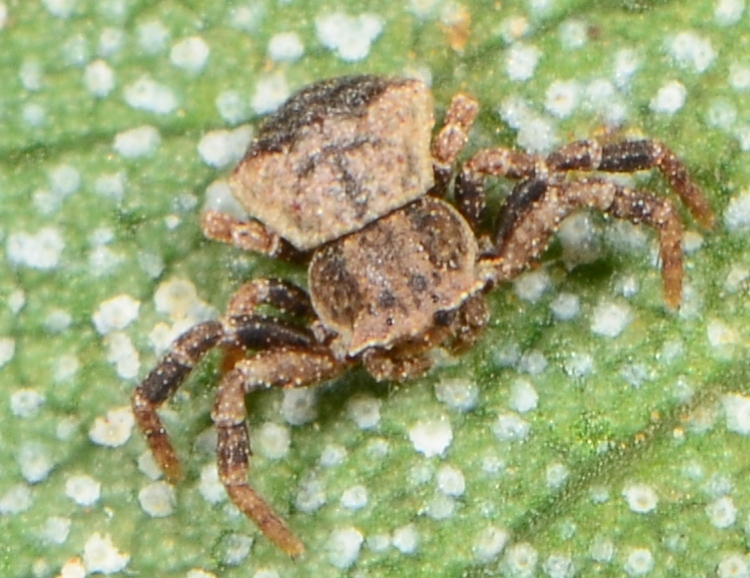
juvenile

Thomisus scrupeus exhibits significant variation in size, color, and body shape between sexes and among individuals. Typically for crab spiders, females are considerably larger than males, measuring 7–8 mm in total length compared to males at 3–5 mm.

The species is distinguished from other African Thomisus species by its granular surface and body covered with small polyp-like tubercles. The two pairs of front legs are notably robust, with thickened patellae and tibiae giving the spider a distinctive sturdy appearance.

The body colour varies dramatically, ranging from off-white to yellow-orange in females to dark brown in males. The body shape also shows considerable variation, with the abdomen ranging from flattened to having more prominent tubercles to being more rounded.

=== Females ===
Females have a carapace that is wider than long, with flattened eye tubercles that are sharply pointed. Both eye rows are recurved. The opisthosoma is bell-shaped and typically features a dark brown band between the abdominal tubercles. The first two pairs of legs are robust with thickened femora, tibiae, and metatarsi. The tibiae of legs I and II bear 3–4 pairs of short, thick macrosetae. The epigyne is simple and U-shaped.

=== Males ===
Males are structurally similar to females but smaller and more flattened. The abdomen lacks the prominent tubercles seen in females, and the macrosetae on the tibiae and metatarsi of legs I and II are longer. The palp is large with a strong retrolateral apophysis and a short embolus.

== Etymology ==
The specific epithet scrupeus is derived from Latin scrupus, meaning "rough", referring to the spider's granular surface.

== Conservation status ==
Thomisus scrupeus has a relatively wide distribution and is considered to be of Least Concern. In South Africa, the species is protected within numerous nature reserves and national parks.
