= KwaDukuza Local Municipality =

KwaDukuza
- Local municipality
- Seal

- Location of KwaDukuza Local Municipality within KwaZulu-Natal
- Coordinates: 29°27′S 31°13′E
- Country: South Africa
- Province: KwaZulu-Natal
- District: iLembe
- Seat: KwaDukuza (Stanger)
- Wards: 30

Government
  - Type: Municipal council
  - Mayor: Cllr Muzi 'Ali' Ngidi (ANC)

Area
  - Total: 735 km^{2} (284 sq mi)

Population (2022)
  - Total: 324,912
  - Density: 442/km^{2} (1,140/sq mi)

Racial makeup (2022)
  - Black African: 71.4%
  - Coloured: 1.1%
  - Indian/Asian: 18.6%
  - White: 8.6%

First languages (2011)
  - Zulu: 66.1%
  - English: 20.8%
  - Xhosa: 7.0%
  - Afrikaans: 1.5%
  - Other: 4.6%
- Time zone: UTC+2 (SAST)
- Municipal code: KZN292

KwaDukuza Local Municipality is one of four municipalities under iLembe District Municipality, KwaZulu-Natal, South Africa. As of 2022 it has a population of 324,912.

== Main places ==
The 2001 census divided the municipality into the following main places:

Place	Code	Area (km^{2})	Population
Ballito	54401	5.66	4,115
Blythedale Beach	54402	0.63	466
Darnall	54403	18.19	7,413
Mathonsi	54405	11.49	4,813
Qwabe (Madundube)	54406	19.54	833
Salt Rock	54407	3.03	2,326
Shaka's Rock	54408	0.69	593
Shakaskraal	54409	2.06	4,574
Stanger	54410	77.71	98,280
Tinley Manor Beach	54411	0.67	473
Zinkwazi Beach	54412	1.36	469
Remainder of the municipality	54404	490.62	34,210

== Politics ==
The municipal council consists of fifty-nine members elected by mixed-member proportional representation. Thirty councillors are elected by first-past-the-post voting in thirty wards, while the remaining twenty-nine are chosen from party lists so that the total number of party representatives is proportional to the number of votes received.

In the election of 4 November 2026 the uMkhonto weSizwe Party (MKP) obtained a plurality of twenty-two seats on the council.

The following table shows the results of the 2026 election.

Party	Ward			List			Total seats
Party	Votes	%	Seats	Votes	%	Seats	Total seats
uMkhonto weSizwe Party	35,657	36.03	17	36,442	36.71	5	22
African National Congress	23,691	23.94	5	23,366	23.54	9	14
Democratic Alliance	22,328	22.56	7	23,154	23.32	7	14
Inkatha Freedom Party	6,213	6.28	0	6,179	6.22	4	4
Independent Alliance	4,155	4.20	1	3,769	3.80	1	2
Economic Freedom Fighters	1,142	1.15	0	1,292	1.30	1	1
ActionSA	1,004	1.01	0	1,209	1.22	1	1
African Independent Congress	784	0.79	0	840	0.85	1	1
Independent candidates	943	0.95	0				0
11 other parties	3,058	3.09	0	3,027	3.05	0	0
Total	98,975	100.00	30	99,278	100.00	29	59
Valid votes	98,975	98.77		99,278	98.90		
Invalid/blank votes	1,232	1.23		1,101	1.10		
Total votes	100,207	100.00		100,379	100.00		
Registered voters/turnout	168,072	59.62		168,072	59.72		

== Corruption ==
In February 2025, ActionSA laid a charge of corruption after Absa bank reported on the withdrawal of more than R30 million rands from the municipal account. In 2026, the mayor and council suspended senior staff members ( including the municipal manager), recovered R30.7 million and resolved to improve governance.

== See also ==
- List of South African municipalities
