= ILembe District Municipality =

iLembe
- District municipality
- Seal

- Location of ILembe District Municipality within KwaZulu-Natal
- Coordinates: 29°20′S 31°17′E
- Country: South Africa
- Province: KwaZulu-Natal
- Seat: KwaDukuza
- Local municipalities: List: Mandeni; KwaDukuza; Ndwedwe; Maphumulo

Government
  - Type: Municipal council
  - Mayor: Sibusiso Welcome Mdabe

Area
  - Total: 3,269 km^{2} (1,262 sq mi)

Population (2011)
  - Total: 606,809
  - Density: 185.6/km^{2} (480.8/sq mi)

Racial makeup (2011)
  - Black African: 90.8%
  - Coloured: 0.5%
  - Indian/Asian: 5.9%
  - White: 2.4%

First languages (2011)
  - Zulu: 82.2%
  - English: 9.6%
  - Xhosa: 3.3%
  - Southern Ndebele: 1.2%
  - Other: 3.7%
- Time zone: UTC+2 (SAST)
- Municipal code: DC29

iLembe is one of the 11 district municipalities of KwaZulu-Natal province in South Africa. The seat of iLembe is KwaDukuza. The majority (82%) of its 606,809 people speak isiZulu as their first language (2011 census). The district code is DC29. It was formerly named the King Shaka District Municipality.

== Geography ==
=== Neighbours ===
iLembe is surrounded by:

- Umzinyathi to the north (DC24)
- the Indian Ocean to the east
- eThekwini to the south (Durban)
- Umgungundlovu to the west (DC22)
- King Cetshwayo District Municipality to the north-east (DC28)
- Umlalazi to the North-west

=== Local municipalities ===
The district contains the following local municipalities:

Local municipality	Population	%
KwaDukuza	231 187	38.10%
Ndwedwe	140 820	23.21%
Mandeni	138 078	22.75%
Maphumulo	96 724	15.94%

== Demographics ==
The following statistics are from the 2011 census.

Language	Population	%
Zulu	496 834	82.18%
English	58 227	9.63%
Xhosa	20 005	3.31%
Ndebele	7 145	1.18%
Afrikaans	5 210	0.86%
Other	4 465	0.74%
Sign language	4 340	0.72%
Tswana	3 156	0.52%
Tsonga	1 916	0.32%
Sotho	1 062	0.18%
Swati	624	0.10%
Venda	261	0.04%

=== Gender ===
Gender	Population	%
Female	317 801	52.37%
Male	289 009	47.63%

=== Ethnic group ===
Ethnic group	Population	%
Black African	550 758	90.76%
Indian/Asian	35 911	5.92%
White	14 713	2.42%
Coloured	3 222	0.53%
Other	2 205	0.36%

=== Age ===
Age	Population	%
000 - 004	63 172	11.27%
005 - 009	70 472	12.58%
010 - 014	71 672	12.79%
015 - 019	68 769	12.27%
020 - 024	51 863	9.25%
025 - 029	44 409	7.92%
030 - 034	34 767	6.20%
035 - 039	32 311	5.77%
040 - 044	26 364	4.70%
045 - 049	21 287	3.80%
050 - 054	19 708	3.52%
055 - 059	14 517	2.59%
060 - 064	13 614	2.43%
065 - 069	9 802	1.75%
070 - 074	8 611	1.54%
075 - 079	4 533	0.81%
080 - 084	2 909	0.52%
085 - 089	876	0.16%
090 - 094	420	0.07%
095 - 099	248	0.04%
100 plus	85	0.02%

== Politics ==
=== Election results ===
Election results for iLembe in the South African general election, 2004.

- Population 18 and over: 312 758 [55.81% of total population]
- Total votes: 166 460 [29.70% of total population]
- Voting % estimate: 53.22% votes as a % of population 18 and over

Party	Votes	%
African National Congress	78 343	47.06%
Inkhata Freedom Party	69 110	41.52%
Democratic Alliance	10 311	6.19%
African Christian Democratic Party	2 113	1.27%
United Democratic Movement	1 214	0.73%
Minority Front	727	0.44%
New National Party	570	0.34%
Azanian People's Organisation	567	0.34%
UF	542	0.33%
Independent Democrats	466	0.28%
Freedom Front Plus	401	0.24%
United Christian Democratic Party	331	0.20%
Pan African Congress	316	0.19%
SOPA	280	0.17%
CDP	247	0.15%
EMSA	228	0.14%
PJC	209	0.13%
KISS	150	0.09%
NA	133	0.08%
TOP	120	0.07%
NLP	82	0.05%
Total	166 460	100.00%

== See also ==
- Municipal Demarcation Board
