= Leisure Bay =

Coastal village in KwaZulu-Natal, South Africa

- Village
- Location within KwaZulu-Natal Location within South Africa
- Coordinates: 31°1′7.32″S 30°14′20.14″E
- Country: South Africa
- Province: KwaZulu-Natal
- District: Ugu
- Municipality: Ray Nkonyeni
- Main Place: Port Edward

Area
  - Total: 0.62 km^{2} (0.24 sq mi)

Population (2011)
  - Total: 126
  - Density: 200/km^{2} (530/sq mi)

First languages (2011)
  - English: 58.73%
  - Afrikaans: 35.71%
  - Zulu: 4.76%
  - Other: 0%
- Time zone: UTC+2 (SAST)
- PO box: 4295
- Area code: 039

Leisure Bay is a small coastal village situated on the Lower South Coast of KwaZulu-Natal, South Africa.

== Geography ==
Situated between Port Edward and Glenmore, Leisure Bay lies approximately 26 kilometres (16 mi) south-west of Port Shepstone and 98 km (61 mi) south-west of Durban.

Leisure Bay is regarded as one of the many extensions of Port Edward including Glenmore Beach, Munster and Palm Beach. The village can also be seen as a collective with the villages of Leisure Crest to the north and Ivy Beach to the south.

== Lifestyle ==
The village is quiet and remains unspoilt with most of it covered in subtropical vegetation due to the little development occurring in these coastal villages between Port Edward and Margate. It is also popular with artists, and many of them live and work in the area due to the tranquil lifestyle of the village.

== Tourism ==
As the name implies, Leisure Bay is a pristine holiday destination or a relaxation escape for tourists. The village has access to three shark-protected beaches Kidds Beach (not to be confused with Kidd's Beach in the Eastern Cape), T.O. Strand and Ivy Beach which are patrolled by lifeguards during school holiday periods.

== Transport ==
Leisure Bay has no access to public transport and is therefore dependent on private transportation. Leisure Bay can be accessed by turning off the R61 (to Port Edward and Port Shepstone) onto the three access roads into the village, namely Fisherman's Drive (north), Torquay Avenue (central) and Old Main Road (south).

== Leisure Bay Conservancy ==
The Leisure Bay Conservancy includes the area from the Boboyi River in the south, the Thongazi River in the north, the Indian Ocean in the east and the R61 in the west and is registered with Ezemvelo KZN Wildlife and Conservation KZN since January 2012. The conservancy was formed to preserve the biodiversity in the natural environment of coastal and riverine forest, coastal bush, grasslands, help control the invasion of alien species, and promote the planting of indigenous vegetation in Leisure Bay. This successfully assisted in preserving wildlife in the area, including caracal, water mongoose, bushbuck, duiker, leopard and a wide range of bird and insect life.

This is one of 6 nature conservancies in the Port Edward/Southbroom area including part of a broader green belt that includes the Munster, Trafalgar, Mpenjati, Marina Beach and Umtamvuna conservancies.
