= Skyline Nature Reserve =

South African nature reserve

- Location within South Africa
- Location: Uvongo, Ray Nkonyeni Local Municipality, KwaZulu-Natal, South Africa
- Nearest city: Margate
- Coordinates: 30°49′10″S 30°23′23″E
- Established: 1962
- Governing body: Ezemvelo KZN Wildlife

Skyline Nature Reserve is a nature reserve established in 1962 between Uvongo and Margate on the South Coast of KwaZulu-Natal, South Africa. The reserve features an arboretum with approximately 380 indigenous and 400 exotic tree species, and is administered by Ezemvelo KZN Wildlife.

== Location ==
The reserve is located on the R61 road near Uvongo in the Ray Nkonyeni Local Municipality, Ugu District Municipality. Together with the Uvongo River Nature Reserve (28 hectares) and a beach reserve, it forms part of a network supporting significant avian biodiversity in the area.

== History ==
The hilltop area now forming Skyline Nature Reserve was originally coastal bush and grassland overlooking St Michael's. In 1936, 14 acres of the site were sold to Frank Duirs, who constructed a homestead before selling the property during the Second World War. The land was later acquired in 1940 by Mr and Mrs Edwards, who expanded it to 38 acres and established windbreaks and gardens.

In 1962, the property was purchased by Hugh and Mrs Nicholson, who developed an extensive arboretum through the clearance of gum stands, construction of access roads and dams, and planting of protective windbreaks. After two decades of continued development, the Nicholsons donated the property to the Borough of Margate on the condition that it be maintained as a nature reserve. Professor Brian Rycroft became its first curator.

Management of the reserve passed to the Natal Parks Board in 1985. Today, Skyline functions as a small coastal protected area contributing to the conservation of indigenous tree species and remnant coastal grassland along the KwaZulu-Natal South Coast.

== Flora ==
The reserve's arboretum contains approximately 380 indigenous tree species (76 coastal species) and 400 exotic species. Most trees are clearly labelled for educational purposes. The reserve protects coastal lowland forest vegetation characteristic of the Maputaland-Pondoland-Albany hotspot.

== Fauna ==
The reserve supports blue duiker (Philantomba monticola), grey duiker (Sylvicapra grimmia), and bushbuck (Tragelaphus scriptus). Dogs are prohibited to minimize wildlife disturbance.

Notable bird species include Knysna turaco (Tauraco corythaix), Narina trogon (Apaloderma narina), and Cape batis (Batis capensis). The reserve's position within the Uvongo River network makes it a prime birdwatching location.

== Amphibians ==
Several frog and toad species occur at Skyline Nature Reserve, reflecting the diversity of wetland and forest-edge habitats in the area. Species recorded on the reserve's educational signage include the forest tree frog (Leptopelis natalensis), painted reed frog (Hyperolius marmoratus), yellow-striped reed frog (Hyperolius semidiscus), snarling puddle frog (Phrynobatrachus natalensis), guttural toad (Sclerophrys gutturalis), red toad (Schismaderma carens), bush squeaker (Arthroleptis wahlbergii), and common platanna (Xenopus laevis).

== Visitor facilities ==
The reserve offers self-guided hiking trails (approximately one hour duration), birdwatching, cycling, and picnicking. Entry is free, with access during daylight hours, though facilities are basic with no designated picnic areas or ablution blocks.

== Management ==
The reserve is managed by Ezemvelo KZN Wildlife, which oversees over 57 protected areas in KwaZulu-Natal. The organization was formed in the 1990s through the merger of the Natal Parks Board and KwaZulu Department of Nature Conservation following apartheid.

Despite operating for over 60 years, the reserve remains relatively unknown, receiving primarily local visitors. Small forest patches like Skyline are important for regional biodiversity and serve as refugia for forest-dependent species.

== Conservation context ==
Skyline is one of several protected areas on the KwaZulu-Natal South Coast, including Oribi Gorge Nature Reserve, Umtamvuna Nature Reserve, and Mpenjati Nature Reserve. These fragmented coastal forest patches are part of a highly threatened ecosystem, with the Indian Ocean Coastal Belt biome classified as critically endangered due to habitat loss from development.

Priority conservation planning has identified coastal forest belts as areas of high importance due to their species richness and endemism. Management is guided by the National Environmental Management: Protected Areas Act (Act No. 57 of 2003).

== See also ==
- Ezemvelo KZN Wildlife
- South Coast (KwaZulu-Natal)
- Ray Nkonyeni Local Municipality
