= Wentworth, KwaZulu-Natal =

Wentworth
- Location within KwaZulu-Natal Location within South Africa
- Coordinates: 29°55′S 31°00′E
- Country: South Africa
- Province: KwaZulu-Natal
- Municipality: eThekwini

Area
  - Total: 3.28 km^{2} (1.27 sq mi)

Population (2011)
  - Total: 24,365
  - Density: 7,430/km^{2} (19,200/sq mi)

Racial makeup (2011)
  - Black African: 16.7%
  - Coloured: 81.7%
  - Indian/Asian: 1.1%
  - White: 0.3%
  - Other: 0.2%

First languages (2011)
  - English: 86.4%
  - Zulu: 7.2%
  - Afrikaans: 2%
  - Xhosa: 1.2%
  - Other: 3.2%
- Time zone: UTC+2 (SAST)
- Postal code (street): 4052

Wentworth is an area of Durban, South Africa in the province of KwaZulu-Natal. It is completely located inside the South Durban Basin. The Wentworth area is located near the M4 and M7 freeways and is approximately 11 km south of the Durban city centre.

== History ==
Wentworth forms part of the South Durban Basin, Initiated in 1938 by British colonialists, the area's original purpose was to serve as an army base. Due to the 1950 Group Areas Act Apartheid-era policy, the region was split into districts depending on ethnic background. Wentworth is still primarily inhabited by people who identify as Coloured. The Bluff Nature Reserve on Tara Road divides Wentworth from the Bluff, and thus the Coloured population from the white one.

In the 1960s, Coloured people were relocated to the swampy, unused land of Wentworth (also known as Austerville). The red-brick buildings in this area, once occupied by white military families, were then converted into homes for Coloured people. Affluent Coloured families were also allowed to purchase prime real estate on Treasure Beach, which was originally set aside for Coloured development.

An area known as "Happy Valley" separates Treasure Beach from Tara Road and Wentworth. This bushland was the site of many informal settlements and tin shanties, but they were soon demolished when the area's two largest oil refineries, Engen and SAPREF, moved in 1952 and 1963, respectively. These two refineries are still both physical and economic landmarks in the area.

Further down Tara Road and past Wentworth is an area known as Merebank: this is where Indians were relocated and where the population is still concentrated today.

== Culture and activities ==
The languages primarily spoken in Wentworth and the surrounding areas are English, isiZulu and Afrikaans.

The mix of cultures leads to a mix of cuisine. Common street foods include samosas, veda and "bunnies", with roots in the Indian community, and biryani is also popular. British tea culture is also found in Wentworth.

Another fixture in Wentworth culture is the use of "combis," or share taxis. The taxis in Wentworth are particularly interesting because of the elaborate way the drivers name and decorate their cars.

There are many local soccer, rugby, and cricket leagues for people of all ages. Because of Wentworth's proximity to the coast, the area is also ideal for fishing, spending time at the beach, and recreational swimming. During June and July, thousands of sardines can be seen migrating along the coast.

== Government and infrastructure ==
Wentworth is part of the eThekwini Metropolitan Municipality. Currently, the Wentworth area votes primarily for the Democratic Alliance (DA), the party that is in direct opposition with the African National Congress (ANC).

Wentworth Hospital is a district level government hospital located on the Bluff.

The South African Post Office is situated on Austerville Drive.

== Violence and crime ==
The South African Police Service has a significant presence in the area, with their offices and local cells located in Austerville Drive. It also operates a Victim Friendly Centre for victims of abuse, and the Majesterial district has one of the major courts in Durban South. However, crime is common in the area, largely due to two significant factors: much of the area lives below the poverty line, and there is a high prevalence of HIV/AIDS and associated drug and alcohol abuse.

The only community-based Addiction Recovery Centre locally open to all in the South Durban Basin is that of Place of Grace which operates a full rehabilitation programme on an out-patient basis with an optional safe-house residence, situated at The Blue Roof Wellness Centre, (which as of 2017 is a youth centre run by Zoë-Life) and is run by Act of Grace 145.

Historically, most of the crime in the area stemmed from either gang violence, drugs, or acts by locals to defend the area from unscrupulous outsiders. In the 1980s in particular, gang violence in Wentworth was supposedly so bad that "people were afraid to walk the streets at night...it was like a war zone". A current major contributing factor is that sometimes outsiders move in, and bring a culture of violence.

Along with the Addiction Recovery Centre and Victim Friendly Centre, other notable forces of change include the national organization Brothers For Life and the Violence Free Zones. The Violence Free Zones were launched in 2008 with the combined efforts of the Brothers For Life and the Prevention in Action (PIA) movement, with the goal of providing community-based action and support against gender-based violence. These zones can be spotted easily because of the neon-coloured houses and signs that mark their beginning and end.

Wentworth is becoming a safe zone and is low on the list of high-crime areas in KwaZulu-Natal. For example, the number of people murdered in 2015 was ten, well below the national average. This includes the deaths of people who lost their lives in the industrial area close by, and business robbery-related deaths.

== Economy and environment ==
Currently, there are approximately 350 businesses in the Wentworth area, the major ones being the SAPREF and Engen oil refineries, and the Mondi and Sappi paper mills. Other industries that make up the Wentworth area include landfills, and water treatment sites.

Environmental justice and apartheid are closely related. Under the Group Areas Act, Blacks, Coloured and Indians were placed in environmentally and aesthetically less pleasing areas, closer to centres of heavy industry, which ultimately led to those communities being exposed to more environmental hazards resulting in "a historically tense relationship between residents, big businesses, and environmentalists" that still continues. Organizations like the South Durban Community Environmental Alliance (SDCEA) fight to change policies surrounding both environmental and social issues.

Despite the fact that Wentworth is a relatively industrialized area, the current unemployment rate still falls somewhere around 40 percent.

== Education ==
=== Primary schools ===
- Assegai Primary: Assegai Primary School was founded in 1961 with the motto “Prosperity, Peace, Progress". The current classrooms were completed about twenty years later. The school's facilities include a computer room, library and grounds with basketball and netball courts as well as a soccer field. The school begins with grade R and continues until grade 7, with four classes of about forty students per grade (excluding grade R, which has two classes). Each class has one teacher. However, the senior primary (grades 4 through 7) has recently adopted a successful program of specialization in which educators are assigned a subject and move from class to class to teach that particular discipline. Assegai's students come from many different areas including both the surrounding Wentworth community and the nearby township of Umlazi. They are taught three languages (English, Zulu, and Afrikaans) in addition to the basic subjects such as Mathematics, Arts and Culture, Geography, etc. Learners also have the option to participate in after-school activities such as soccer, baseball, and rugby.
- Austerville Primary was founded in 1960. It was the first school for so-called mixed races. The motto is "Progress through knowledge". From 1960 to 1978 the school was housed in the K2 building. In February 1978 the school moved into the building on Silvertree Road. Facilities at the school include a computer room, audio-visual room and a library.

Other primary schools are:

- Collingwood Primary
- Durban East Primary
- Gardenia Primary
- Wentworth Primary
- Bluff Christian Academy

=== Secondary schools ===
- Fairvale Secondary
- Umbilo Secondary
- Wentworth Secondary
- Bluff Christian Academy

=== Public libraries ===
Austerville Library is located on Austerville Drive next to the local community hall.
