= Ezemvelo KZN Wildlife =

South African wildlife conservation organisation

- KwaZulu-Natal Nature Conservation Board
- Formation: Natal Parks, Game and Fish Preservation Board - 1947; 79 years ago; Ezemvelo KZN Wildlife - 1994; 32 years ago
- Headquarters: Queen Elizabeth Park Nature Reserve, 1 Peter Brown Drive, Town Bush Valley
- Location: Pietermaritzburg, South Africa
- Coordinates: 29°34′23.9372″S 30°19′34.0414″E
- Parent organisation: KwaZulu-Natal Department of Economic Development and Environmental Affairs
- Expenses: R (45.6 million) (2022/23)
- Staff: 3094 (2022/23)
- Website: www.kznwildlife.com

Ezemvelo KZN Wildlife (officially, the KwaZulu-Natal Nature Conservation Board) is a governmental organisation responsible for maintaining wildlife conservation areas and biodiversity in KwaZulu-Natal Province, South Africa. Their headquarters is in Queen Elizabeth Park situated on the northern slopes of Pietermaritzburg, the KwaZulu-Natal provincial capital. Prior to 1994, it was known as the Natal Parks Board.

== History ==
The first known person to provide protection to wildlife in the region was Zulu King Shaka, who prevented excessive hunting of game animals in the Umfolozi River valley in the early 19th century. However King Shaka used this area for his own hunting purposes and cannot be classed as a 'preservationist'.

Voortrekkers, who entered the region now known as KwaZulu-Natal in the early 19th century, also had conservation policies. The Voortrekker leader Piet Retief had rules excluding the unnecessary shooting of game, and veld burning was strictly controlled.

Zulu King Mpande is known to have afforded protection to the Ongoye Forest. He is also said to have issued an edict preventing the killing of large game animals.

The Durban Botanic Garden was founded in 1859, and although founded for studies into economically important exotic plants, soon became a centre for the study of local plants, and ultimately led to realising the importance of protecting areas of natural vegetation.

In 1866, the Natal Government drew up the first game laws at a time when Zululand was still independent. Zululand was annexed in 1887 and this allowed the exploitation of game animals by immigrants.

The decimation of the wildlife was noted by both hunters and early naturalists, and in 1895 the first game reserves were proclaimed. These included; Umfolozi junction, St Lucia, Hluhluwe valley and Pongolo-Umkuzi. Many years followed where conflict arose over disease spreading from the protected game and a difference in priorities was evident between conservationists and farmers. Some game reserves were deproclaimed and the Nagana Campaign was implemented, which caused severe degradation of ecosystems.

In 1947, the Natal Parks, Game and Fish Preservation Board was established to enforce laws relating to wildlife in Natal and Zululand, which by that time were a single province of South Africa known as Natal. The name of the organisation was later simplified to the Natal Parks Board.

In 1982, Dr. Mangosuthu Buthelezi established the KwaZulu Bureau of Natural Resources, later renamed the KwaZulu Department of Nature Conservation, which managed conservation areas in the former KwaZulu homeland under the Apartheid Government.

After the end of Apartheid the Natal Parks Board and KwaZulu Department of Nature Conservation became a single organisation, which was eventually called the KwaZulu-Natal Nature Conservation Service. More recently the name was changed to Ezemvelo KZN Wildlife.

== Conservation ==
The Natal Parks Board was instrumental in saving the southern white rhino (Ceratotherium simum simum) from extinction. All southern white rhinos today (over 20,000 individuals) are descended from the remnant population of Umfolozi. Today Ezemvelo KZN Wildlife is involved with saving a subspecies of the south-central black rhinoceros (Diceros bicornis minor), of which virtually all of the animals now living in South Africa are descended from the remnant population of Umfolozi.

The areas managed by Ezemvelo KZN Wildlife include marine turtle nesting sites (loggerhead and leatherback turtles), coelacanth habitat and three centres of endemism. Two of the areas managed are World Heritage Sites (iSimangaliso and uKhahlamba).

== Some major parks managed by Ezemvelo ==
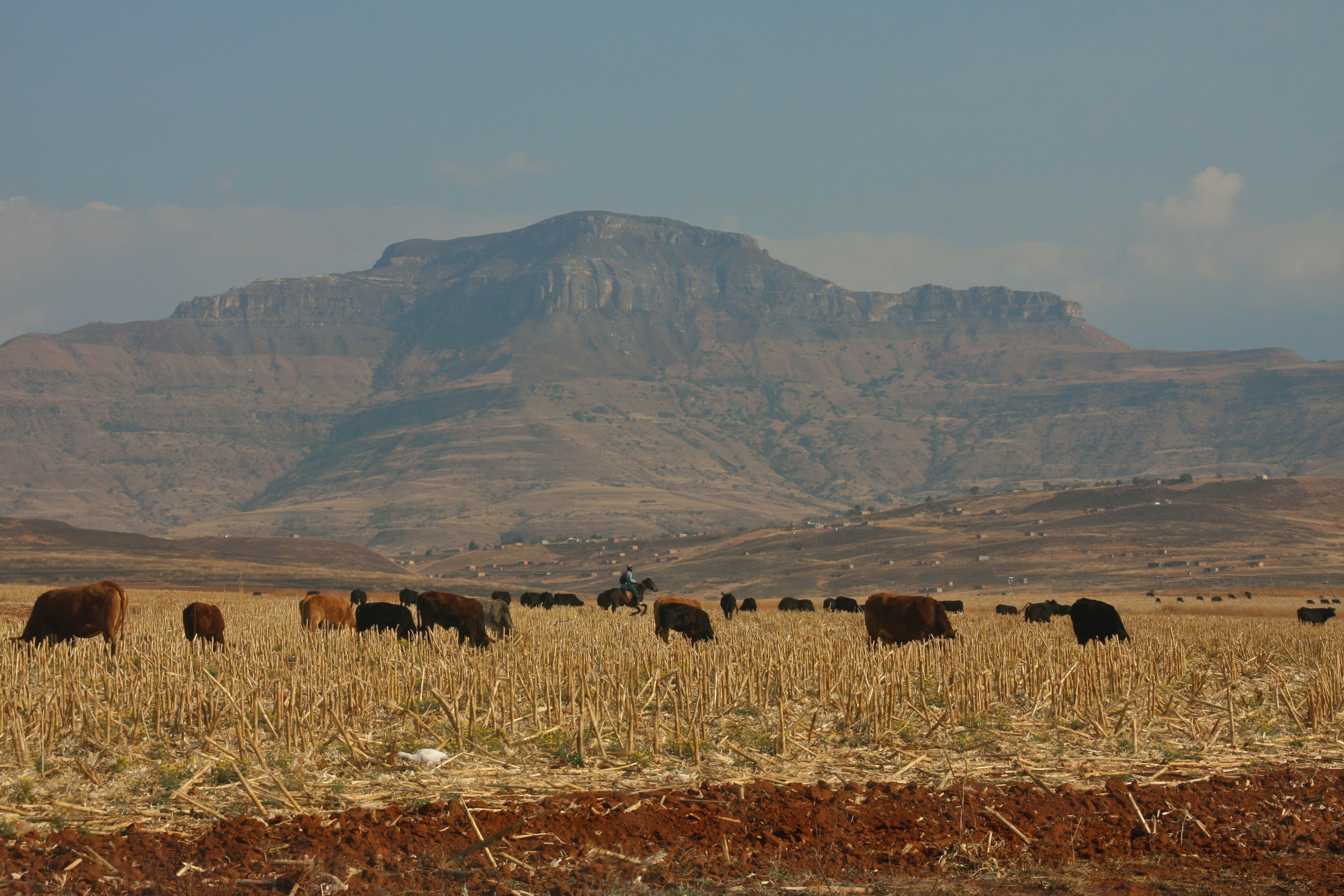
Royal Natal National Park

Ezemvelo KZN Wildlife manages over 120 protected areas across KwaZulu-Natal, ranging from small urban reserves to extensive wilderness areas. These include two UNESCO World Heritage Sites: the iSimangaliso Wetland Park (inscribed 1999) and the uKhahlamba Drakensberg Park (inscribed 2000). The organisation's flagship reserve is Hluhluwe–iMfolozi Park, Africa's oldest proclaimed game reserve, established in 1895.

- iSimangaliso Wetland Park
- Hluhluwe–iMfolozi Park
- Natal Drakensberg Park, part of the Maloti-Drakensberg Transfrontier Conservation Area
- Tembe Elephant Park, part of the Lubombo Transfrontier Conservation Area
- uMkhuze Game Reserve
- Oribi Gorge
- Ithala Game Reserve
- Royal Natal National Park

The organisation manages over 57 parks in total.

== St Lucia Parks ==
- Amatikulu Nature Reserve
- Isimangaliso Wetland Park
  - Cape Vidal
  - Kosi Bay Nature Reserve
- Mpenjati

== Mountain areas ==
- Didima north of Monk's Cowl in the Cathedral Peak area, 35000 ha.
- Cobham and Vergeglen near Himeville Village, 52000 ha.
- Garden Castle includes the Bushman's Nek Valley.
- Giant's Castle
- Highmoor also known as Mkhomazi Wilderness Area, 15000 ha.
- Himeville near Himeville Village, 104 ha.
- injisuthi in the northern section of Giant's Castle area.

== Nature reserves ==
- Blinkwater Nature Reserve north of Pietermaritzburg
- Bluff Nature Reserve near Durban, 45 ha.
- Harold Johnson Nature Reserve near Thugela River mouth, 100 ha.
- Kenneth Stainbank Nature Reserve in Yellowwood Park, Durban, 253 ha.
- Krantzkloof Nature Reserve in Kloof, between Hillcrest and Pinetown, near Durban, 600 ha.
- Mpenjati Nature Reserve near Trafalgar, 66 hectares (160 acres)
- North Park Nature Reserve adjacent to the Umhlahazana River, 52 ha.
- Oribi Gorge Nature Reserve near Port Shepstone,
- Skyline Nature Reserve
- Umtamvuna Nature Reserve bordering the Mtamvuna River, 3 247 ha.
- Ntsikeni Nature Reserve, 9 286.61 ha wetland reserve

== Forests ==
- Beachwood Mangroves
- Dlinza Forest
- Entumeni Forest
- Ncandu Forest
- Ongoye Forest
- Nkandla Forest

== Controversies ==
In 2023, Karpowership bought and gifted a game farm to Ezemvelo KZN Wildlife in exchange for not objecting to mooring a 450 MW ship-mounted power plant at Richards Bay Harbour.

== Finances ==
In 2022/23, Ezemvelo KZN Wildlife received R 854.8 million in grants from the Department of Economic Development, Tourism and Environmental Affairs. In 2022/23, it had a net deficit R 45.6 million.

=== Auditor's concerns ===
In the 2022/23 annual report, Ezemvelo KZN Wildlife received a qualified opinion due to irregular expenditure and misstating property, plant and equipment values, in addition to not having recorded various assets. The auditor-general stated that "a material uncertainty exists that may cast significant doubt on the KZN Nature Conservation Board's ability to continue as a going concern."Ezemvelo KZN Wildlife had attained a deficit for the prior year and in 2023.

== See also ==
- South African National Parks – Body responsible for managing South Africa's national parks
- List of protected areas of South Africa

== Bibliography ==
- Pooley, T. and Player, I. (1995). KwaZulu-Natal Wildlife Destinations. ISBN 1-86812-487-8.
