= Xanthoparmelia subruginosa =

Scientific classification
- Kingdom: Fungi
- Division: Ascomycota
- Class: Lecanoromycetes
- Order: Lecanorales
- Family: Parmeliaceae
- Genus: Xanthoparmelia
- Species: X. subruginosa

Binomial name
- Xanthoparmelia subruginosa Hale (1986)

Species of lichen

Xanthoparmelia subruginosa is a species of saxicolous (rock-dwelling), foliose lichen in the family Parmeliaceae. Found in South Africa, it was formally described as a new species in 1986 by the American lichenologist Mason Hale. The type specimen was collected by Hale from the Oribi Gorge Nature Reserve (Natal) at an elevation of 300 m (980 ft), where he found it growing on flat sandstone exposures back from a cliff. The lichen thallus, which is loosely attached to its rock substrate, is bright yellowish green and measures 6–10 cm (2.4–3.9 in) in diameter. It contains stictic acid, constictic acid, and usnic acid.

== See also ==
- List of Xanthoparmelia species
