= Robert Woodson =

American civil rights activist (1937–2026)

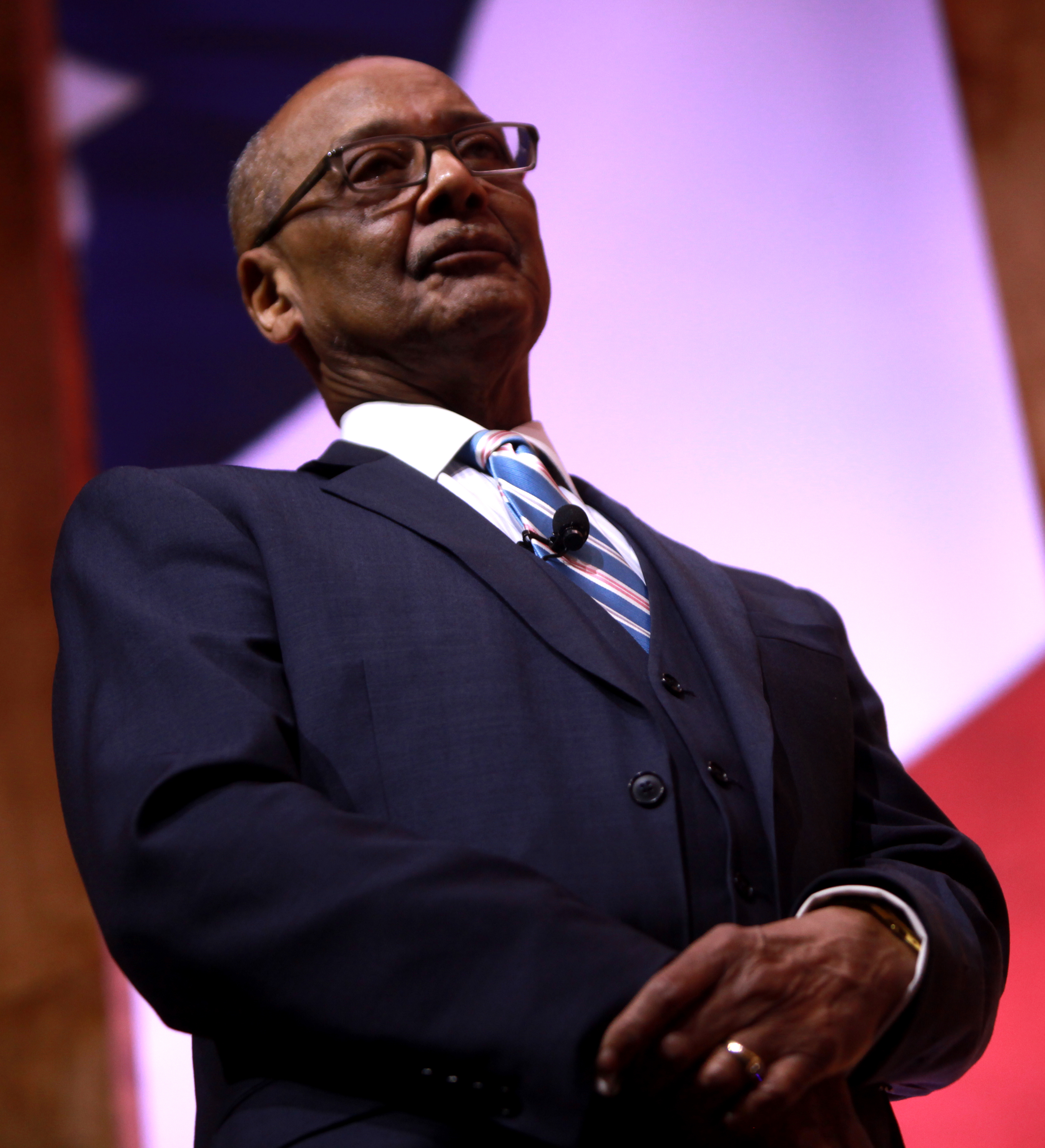
- Woodson in 2014
- Born: Robert Leon Woodson; April 8, 1937; Philadelphia, Pennsylvania, U.S.
- Died: May 19, 2026 (aged 89); Silver Spring, Maryland, U.S.
- Education: Cheyney University (BS); University of Pennsylvania (MSW)
- Occupations: Civil rights activist, writer
- Spouse: Ellen Hylton (m. 1977)
- Children: 4
- Awards: Presidential Citizens Medal (2008)
- Military career
- Allegiance: United States
- Branch: United States Air Force

Robert Leon Woodson Sr. (April 8, 1937 – May 19, 2026) was an American conservative and civil rights activist, community development leader and author. He was founder and president of the Woodson Center, a non-profit research and demonstration organization that supports neighborhood-based initiatives to revitalize low-income communities.

Woodson was noted for his belief in self-reliance over governmental intervention to address racism and poverty and to lower crime rates. He served as an advisor to Presidents Ronald Reagan and George H. W. Bush and as a counselor for US Secretary of Housing and Urban Development Jack Kemp and US Speaker of the House Paul Ryan.

== Early life, family, military service and education ==
Robert Leon Woodson was born in Philadelphia, Pennsylvania, on April 8, 1937. His father died soon after; Woodson and his four siblings were raised by his mother. In 1954, at age 17, he dropped out of high school to join the United States Air Force. While in the Air Force, he passed the GED tests. He was stationed at Patrick Air Force Base in Florida, where his aptitude for mathematics led to specialized training on equipment used in missile tracking. He obtained flying status and was one of three black servicemen at the base to do so.

After leaving the Air Force, he attended Cheyney University, graduating in 1962 with a Bachelor of Science in mathematics. He subsequently earned his Master of Social Work in 1965 from the University of Pennsylvania.

== Activism ==
=== Civil rights ===
Woodson was involved in civil rights and community development beginning in 1962. While completing his graduate work, Woodson became active in the civil rights movement, directing and coordinating community development programs for a number of local and national organizations, including the NAACP. After resigning from the NAACP, Woodson moved to Boston, where he spent three years as a social worker with the Unitarian Services Committee.

As a director of the National Urban League, Woodson began developing a strategy to reduce crime by strengthening community institutions closest to high-crime areas. Woodson continued developing the idea of neighborhood empowerment during his time as director of the American Enterprise Institute's Neighborhood Revitalization Project in Washington, D.C. He later became an adjunct fellow at the institute, providing technical support and advice to community groups.

In February 2020, Woodson launched the center's 1776 Unites campaign to counter The 1619 Project. He believed that the 1619 Project by The New York Times "disparages the American Revolution".

=== Neighborhood empowerment movement ===
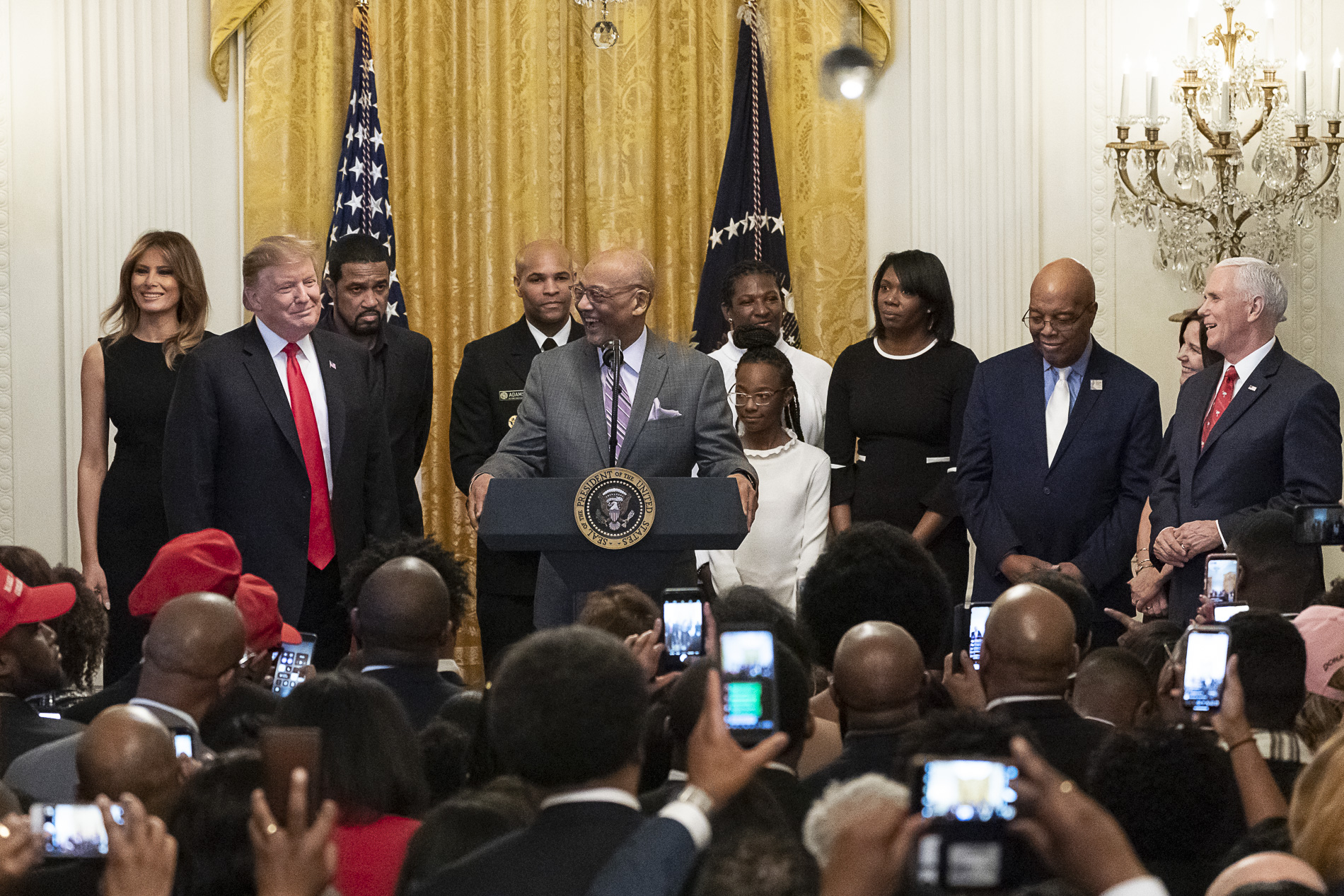
Woodson and President Donald Trump at a White House reception in honor of Black History Month, February 21, 2019

Woodson's strategy of neighborhood empowerment was to seek solutions to the problems of low-income communities among what he called the social entrepreneurs that are indigenous to these communities. Rather than a poverty program directed by a government agency, Woodson's program seeks out families in these disinvested neighborhoods that have prospered and persevered to learn from their success.

In 1973 Vernon Jordan, head of the Urban League, and Representative John Conyers, chair of the U.S. House subcommittee on crime in the Judiciary Committee, supported Woodson's opposition to vesting more power to Justice agencies as a solution to crime, and a better solution was focusing on neighborhood empowerment.

In 1981 Woodson founded the CNE (now the Woodson Center) to promote "self-help" solutions in low income neighborhoods by promoting and supporting indigenous leaders in those neighborhoods. The CNE created the Violence-Free Zones program to reduce the level of violence in schools and help at-risk youth escape the life of violence and crime.

=== Politics ===
By the 1980s, Woodson became part of "Washington's inner circle" and served as an advisor to several Republican politicians, including presidents. He worked closely with President Ronald Reagan and was considered for a government position in the United States Department of Housing and Urban Development during the George H. W. Bush administration. He opted to serve as an advisor to HUD Secretary Jack Kemp.

On November 15, 2016, the CNE was rebranded as the Woodson Center as a tribute to Woodson. That same year, Woodson was considered as a possible candidate for Secretary of Housing and Urban Development in the first cabinet of President Donald Trump. Earlier, he had served as a counselor for US Speaker Paul Ryan's housing agenda.

== Personal life and death ==
In 1977, Woodson married Ellen Hylton, and together they raised four children: Robert Woodson Jr., Jamal Woodson, Tanya Woodson-Monestel, and Ralph Woodson. On February 8, 2003, his son, Robert L. Woodson Jr., was killed in an automobile accident.

Woodson died at his home in Silver Spring, Maryland, on May 19, 2026, at the age of 89.

== Awards ==
- 1990 MacArthur Fellows Program MacArthur "Genius" award
- 2008 Bradley Prize
- 2008 Presidential Citizens Medal
- 2008 Social Entrepreneurship Award from the Manhattan Institute
- 2024 William L. Armstrong Award from Colorado Christian University

== Honorary degrees ==
- University of Cincinnati, Cincinnati, Ohio: Honorary Doctorate, 2012 (Doctor of Humane Letters)
- Colorado Christian University, Denver, Colorado: Honorary Doctorate, 2010 (Doctorate of Humanities)

== Selected works ==
- Woodson, Robert L., Sr., ed. (May 18, 2021). Red, White, and Black: Rescuing American History from Revisionists and Race Hustlers. Emancipation Books. ISBN 978-1-64293-778-7 – via Simon & Schuster.
- "The Left Forgets What Martin Luther King Stood For". The Wall Street Journal. January 17, 2020. Archived from the original on December 12, 2020.
- "Ganging Up for Good". The Washington Post. August 21, 2005. Archived from the original on November 10, 2012.
- Youth Crime and Urban Policy, A View From the Inner City. American Enterprise Institute for Public Policy Research. 1981. ISBN 978-0-8447-2210-8.
- Woodson, Robert L., ed. (1987). On the Road to Economic Freedom: An Agenda for Black Progress. Regnery Gateway. ISBN 978-0-89526-578-4.
- A Summons to Life, Mediating Structures and the Prevention of Youth Crime. Ballinger Pub. Co. 1981. ISBN 978-0-88410-826-9.
- The Triumphs of Joseph: How Today's Community Healers are Reviving Our Streets and Neighborhoods. The Free Press. 1998. ISBN 978-0-684-82742-1 – via Google Books.
- Woodson, Robert L., ed. (1977). Black Perspectives on Crime and the Criminal Justice System: A Symposium. G. K. Hall. ISBN 978-0-8161-8039-4.
