= Messapus meridionalis =

Scientific classification
- Kingdom: Animalia
- Phylum: Arthropoda
- Subphylum: Chelicerata
- Class: Arachnida
- Order: Araneae
- Infraorder: Araneomorphae
- Family: Corinnidae
- Genus: Messapus
- Species: M. meridionalis

Binomial name
- Messapus meridionalis Haddad & Mbo, 2015

Species of spider

Messapus meridionalis is a spider species in the family Corinnidae.

== Distribution ==
Messapus meridionalis is endemic to South Africa, known only from KwaZulu-Natal Province. The species is known only from the type locality, Oribi Gorge Nature Reserve.

== Habitat and ecology ==
This species is free-living and was sampled during canopy fogging in riparian forest in the Savanna biome at 416 m above sea level.

== Conservation ==
Messapus meridionalis is listed as Data Deficient for Taxonomic reasons by the South African National Biodiversity Institute. It is possibly under-collected and more localities are suspected to occur. More sampling is needed to collect the male and determine the species' range. There are no known threats to the species.

== Taxonomy ==
The species was described by Haddad & Mbo in 2015 from Oribi Gorge Nature Reserve, KwaZulu-Natal. It is known only from the female.
