= Southbroom =

Coastal village in KwaZulu-Natal, South Africa

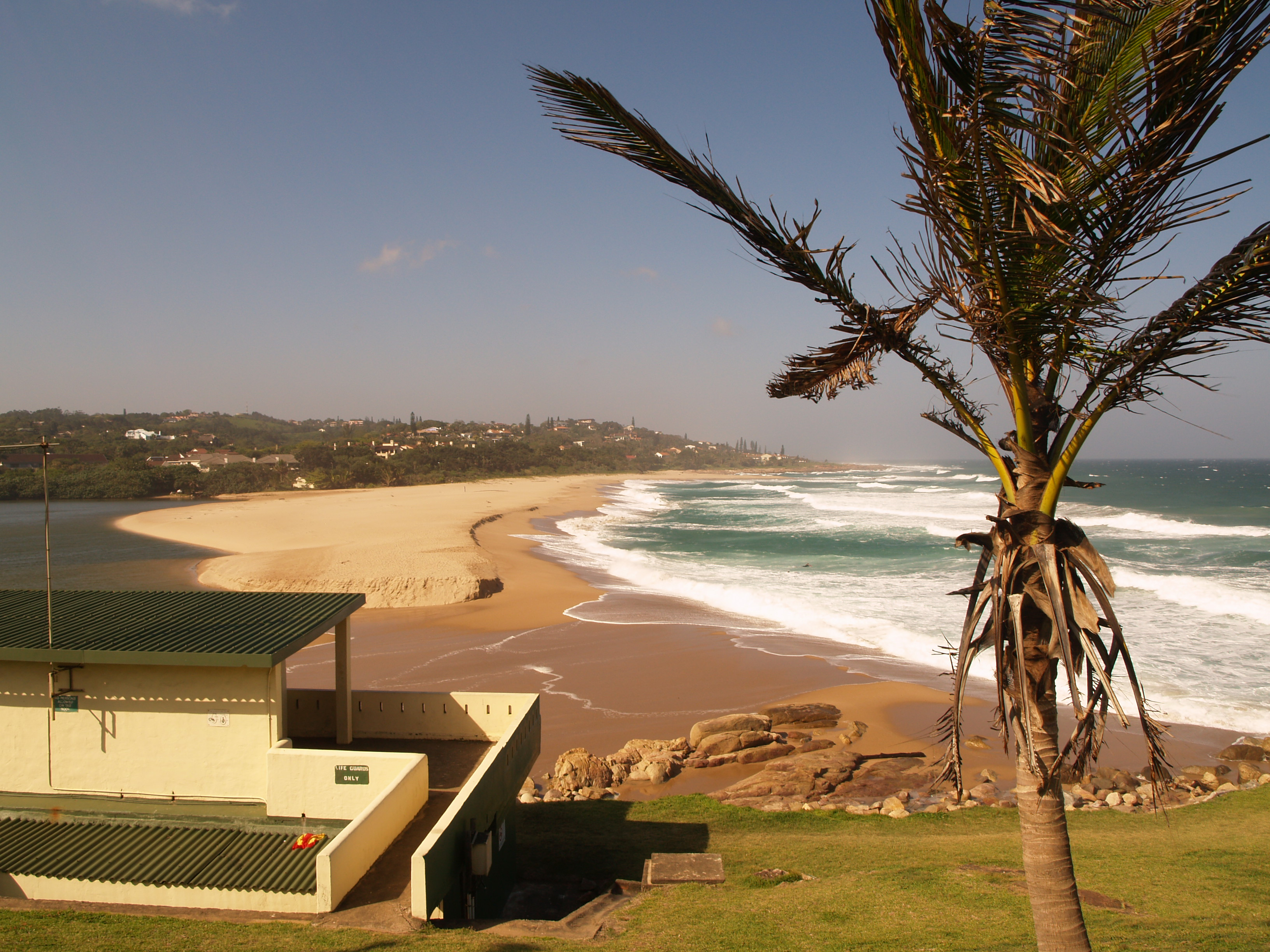
- Southbroom beach

- Location within KwaZulu-Natal Location within South Africa
- Coordinates: 30.920°S 30.317°E
- Country: South Africa
- Province: KwaZulu-Natal
- District: Ugu
- Municipality: Ray Nkonyeni

Area
  - Total: 10.93 km^{2} (4.22 sq mi)

Population (2011)
  - Total: 1,615
  - Density: 147.8/km^{2} (382.7/sq mi)

Racial makeup (2011)
  - Black African: 25.6%
  - Coloured: 0.5%
  - Indian/Asian: 0.4%
  - White: 73.1%
  - Other: 0.4%

First languages (2011)
  - English: 54.2%
  - Afrikaans: 24.6%
  - Zulu: 11.3%
  - Xhosa: 4.7%
  - Other: 5.1%
- Time zone: UTC+2 (SAST)
- PO box: 4277
- Area code: 039

Southbroom is a coastal village on the South Coast of the KwaZulu-Natal province of South Africa situated approximately halfway between Port Shepstone – 23 km (14 mi) and Port Edward – 18 km (11 mi).

Southbroom lies approximately 143 km (89 mi) southwest of the coastal city of Durban, and 213 km (132 mi) south of the provincial capital city of Pietermaritzburg. The village was officially founded in 1933, and in the 2011 census had a population of 1,615 in 847 households.

== History ==
In 1884, a pioneer named Alfred Eyles established a mission on the site of the present day Outlook Farm. This is the earliest recorded settlement of Southbroom. In 1895, The Fascadale was wrecked on rocks off Southbroom beach while en route to Lisbon, Portugal, but the timely arrival of another vessel meant that only two people died.

The name "Southbroom" was first associated with the area in 1908, when the Swedish Zulu Mission took over the mission from the Eyles family, who subsequently renamed their home "Southbroom"; a reference to a family home in their native England. Frank and Gilbert Eyles, the youngest sons of Alfred, proclaimed the township in 1933.

In 1935, the Southbroom Hotel opened, with its tidal pool (known as Granny's Pool) opening two years later. The golf course was first opened in 1939, before being extended to a full 18 holes in 1948.

== Geography ==
=== Location ===
Southbroom is situated between Ramsgate to the north and Marina Beach to the south, and is bounded by the uMbizane River to the north and the Kaba River to the south.

=== Suburbs ===
The 2011 census divided the main area of Southbroom into four “sub places”: Southbroom proper (pop. 878), Marina Beach (pop. 247), San Lameer (pop. 93) and Trafalgar (pop. 397).

== Culture and contemporary life ==
=== Beaches ===
Southbroom is also home to five beaches within its vicinity including Southbroom Main Beach, Umkobi Beach on the Kaba river mouth, Marina Beach, San Lameer Beach and Trafalgar Beach. Two of these beaches, Marina Beach and Trafalgar Beach, are accredited with the international Blue Flag beach status and have been holding it for many years.

=== Golf ===
Southbroom boasts two golf courses within its vicinity, Southbroom Golf Club and San Lameer Country Club.

==== Southbroom Golf Club ====
Southbroom Golf Club is a small 18-hole golf course stretching along the coastline of the village between the smattering of residences, making it an integral component of Southbroom and also ranked the most fun golf course in South Africa.

==== San Lameer Country Club ====
The more popular San Lameer Country Club located within the San Lameer Estate, south of Southbroom is a 18-hole Championship golf course designed by Peter Matkovich and Dale Hayes and is ranked by Compleat Golfer as one of the toughest golf courses in South Africa and is consistently ranked amongst the 30 best golf courses in South Africa by Golf Digest.

=== Tourism and hospitality ===
Similarly to most seaside communities along the KwaZulu-Natal South Coast, Southbroom is largely dependent on tourism for its small-scale economy. Southbroom is widely known for the San Lameer Estate, located just south of the village which includes an 18-hole Championship golf course (one of the most popular golf courses on the South coast), luxury villas, a hotel and spa.

Other than San Lameer, Southbroom hosts several hospitality establishments such as B&Bs, guest houses and restaurants.

== Infrastructure ==
=== Roads ===
The R61 (future N2 Wild Coast Toll Road) is a provincial route passing Southbroom from Port Shepstone in the north to Port Edward in the south. Southbroom marks the southern end of the freeway section of the R61 and the South Coast Toll Road and the northern end of the limited-access route towards Port Edward.

The R620 is the alternative route to the R61 connecting Southbroom with Port Shepstone via Ramsgate and Margate. The two main access roads into the village are Southbroom Avenue (north) and Eyles Road (south).

== Nature ==
The Mpenjati Lagoon Nature Reserve, located between Trafalgar and Palm Beach is a 60 -hectare area on the shore of the Indian Ocean and encloses the lagoon of the Mpenjati River.
