= Bluff Nature Reserve =

Nature reserve in Durban, KwaZulu-Natal, South Africa

- Happy Valley
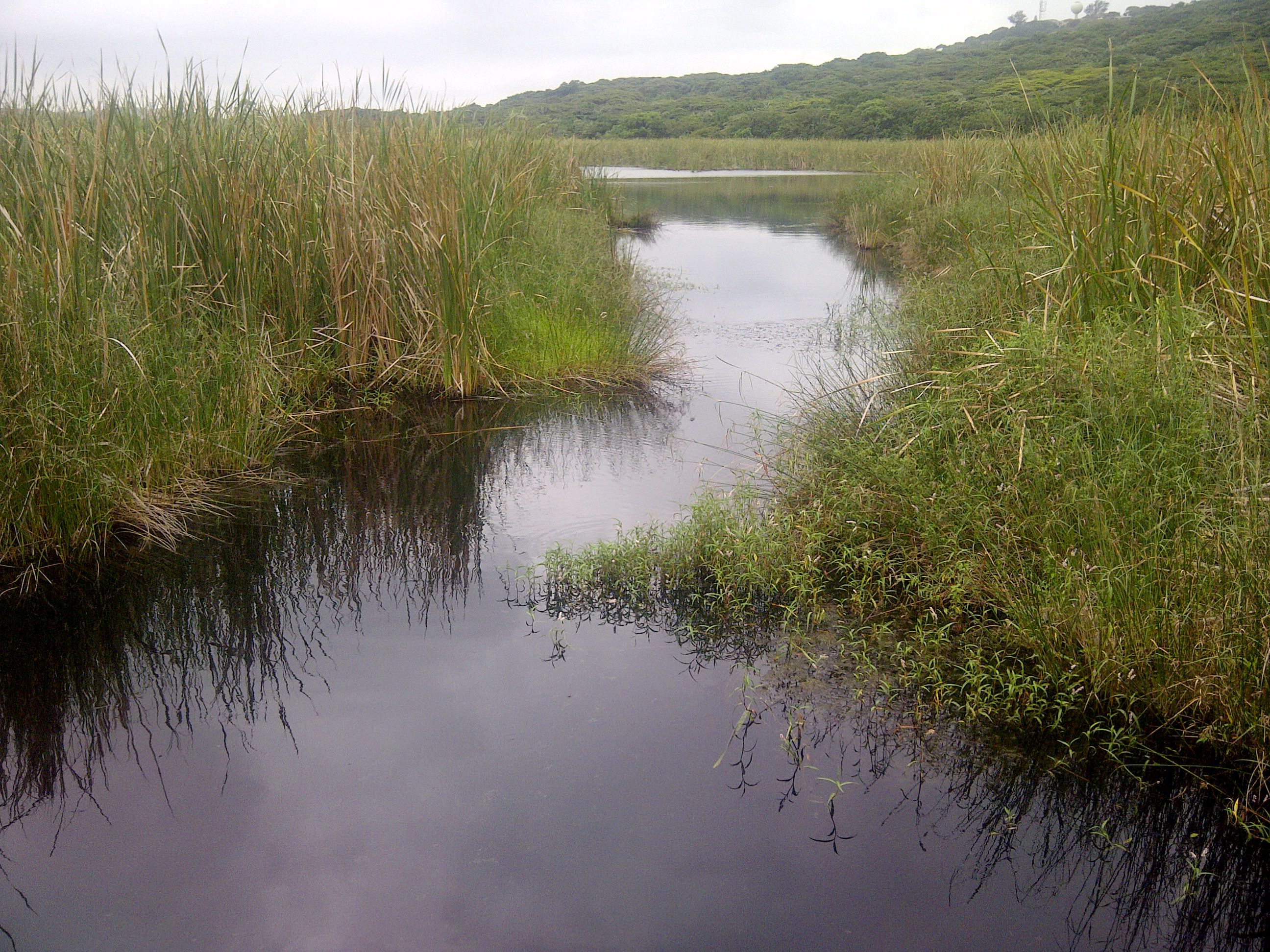
- The pan seen from the hide near the entrance

- Location within KwaZulu-Natal
- Location: Durban, South Africa
- Coordinates: 29°56′05″S 30°59′34″E
- Area: 45 ha (110 acres)
- Established: 1974
- Governing body: Ezemvelo KZN Wildlife
- Website: Official Webpage

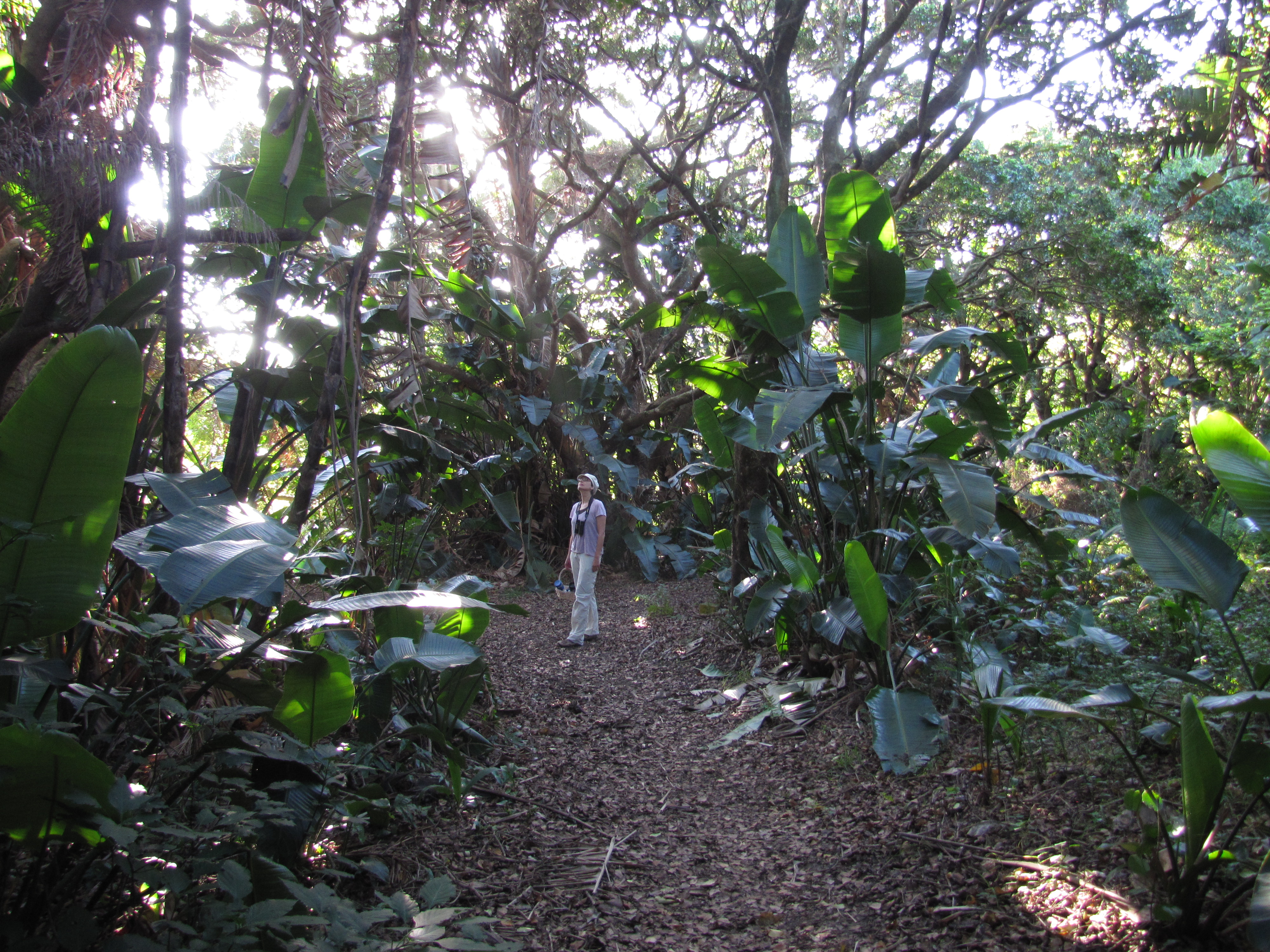
In the riverine forest

Bluff Nature Reserve is a 45 hectares (110 acres) protected pan and forest in the suburb of The Bluff, Durban, South Africa. The park was proclaimed in 1974, making it Durban's oldest nature reserve, and is managed by Ezemvelo KZN Wildlife.

The nature reserve has bird watching facilities which overlook the pan. There is a self-guided trail throughout the reserve.

== Flora and fauna ==
The pan section of the park contains the remnant of a large swamp that once covered the area, while the forest section comprises a small patch of KwaZulu-Natal coastal lowland forest.

=== Birds ===
The following birds are found in the reserve:

- Cormorants
- Crakes
- Spoonbills
- Warblers

=== Mammals ===
The following mammals are found in the reserve:

- Banded Mongoose
- Common Rodent Mole
- Giant Musk Shrew
- Grey Climbing Mouse
- Hottentot Golden Mole
- Multimammate Mouse
- Slender Mongoose
- Vervet Monkey
