= Messapus martini =

Martin's Messapus dark sac spider

Conservation status
- Least Concern (SANBI Red List)

Scientific classification
- Kingdom: Animalia
- Phylum: Arthropoda
- Subphylum: Chelicerata
- Class: Arachnida
- Order: Araneae
- Infraorder: Araneomorphae
- Family: Corinnidae
- Genus: Messapus
- Species: M. martini

Binomial name
- Messapus martini Simon, 1898

Species of spider

Messapus martini is a spider species in the family Corinnidae. It is commonly known as Martin's Messapus dark sac spider.

== Distribution ==
Messapus martini occurs in southern Africa, including Zambia and South Africa. In South Africa, the species has been recorded from three provinces, Gauteng, KwaZulu-Natal and Mpumalanga.

== Habitat and ecology ==
This species is a free-living spider with contrasting habits, collected from the soil surface, tree bark and tree canopies. Some specimens were observed actively hunting on bark at night. Both sexes were collected from dense silk retreats constructed in the fissures of bark of mature large trees. The species has been sampled from leaf litter, pit traps and canopy fogging, and is known from the Forest, Indian Ocean Coastal Belt, Grassland and Savanna biomes, as well as synanthropic habitats, at altitudes ranging from 5 to 1,647 m above sea level.

== Conservation ==
Messapus martini is listed as Least Concern by the South African National Biodiversity Institute due to its wide geographical range. There are no known threats to the species and it is recorded from several protected areas.

== Taxonomy ==
The species was originally described by Eugène Simon in 1898, with the type locality given only as "Natal". It was redescribed by Haddad (2013) and is known from both sexes.
