= Messapus natalis =

Giant Messapus dark sac spider

Conservation status
- Least Concern (SANBI Red List)

Scientific classification
- Kingdom: Animalia
- Phylum: Arthropoda
- Subphylum: Chelicerata
- Class: Arachnida
- Order: Araneae
- Infraorder: Araneomorphae
- Family: Corinnidae
- Genus: Messapus
- Species: M. natalis

Binomial name
- Messapus natalis (Pocock, 1898)

Species of spider

Messapus natalis is a spider species in the family Corinnidae. It is commonly known as the Giant Messapus dark sac spider.

== Distribution ==
Messapus natalis occurs in southern Africa, including Mozambique and South Africa. In South Africa, the species has been sampled from three provinces: KwaZulu-Natal, Limpopo and Mpumalanga.

== Habitat and ecology ==
Messapus natalis is primarily an arboreal species, with specimens collected from retreats constructed in fissures or similar structures on tree bark, or in canopy fogging samples. It has been collected from the Forest, Savanna and Indian Ocean Coastal Belt biomes at altitudes ranging from 17 to 975 m above sea level.

== Conservation ==
Messapus natalis is listed as Least Concern by the South African National Biodiversity Institute due to its wide geographical range and no known threats. The species is conserved in three protected areas Ndumo Game Reserve, Lowveld National Botanical Gardens and Dukuduku Forest.

== Taxonomy ==
The species was originally described by Reginald Innes Pocock in 1898 as Corinna natalis from Durban, South Africa. It was redescribed by Haddad (2013) and transferred to Messapus by Haddad (2013). The species is known from both sexes and is the largest described species of Corinnidae from Africa known to date.
