= Munster, South Africa =

Munster
- Location within KwaZulu-Natal Location within South Africa
- Coordinates: 31.004°S 30.253°E
- Country: South Africa
- Province: KwaZulu-Natal
- District: Ugu
- Municipality: Ray Nkonyeni
- Main Place: Port Edward

Area
  - Total: 1.67 km^{2} (0.64 sq mi)

Population (2001)
  - Total: 114
  - Density: 68.3/km^{2} (177/sq mi)

Racial makeup (2001)
  - Black African: 15.8%
  - Coloured: 10.5%
  - Indian/Asian: 10.5%
  - White: 63.2%

First languages (2001)
  - English: 55.3%
  - Afrikaans: 28.9%
  - Xhosa: 15.8%
- Time zone: UTC+2 (SAST)
- PO box: 4278

Munster is a quiet coastal village on the South Coast of KwaZulu-Natal, South Africa, situated approximately 9 kilometres (5,6 mi) north of Port Edward and 37 kilometres (23 mi) south-west of Port Shepstone, between Glenmore and Palm Beach.

== Facilities ==
Notable facilities in Munster include a small airfield that lies along the R61, many guest houses in the area, a service station in Glenmore and a pharmacy.

== Tourism ==
Munster Beach enjoys a backdrop of picturesque coastal vegetation, which is home to birds and bugs, adding to the biodiversity.

The mouth of the iThongasi River is used for launching boats, and Glenmore Beach hosts beauty and fishing competitions.The annual Sardine Run ,which beached in Glenmore Bag in 2000 and 2001, attracts large schools of dolphins.

== Glenmore ==
Glenmore is a small coastal village south of Munster, beyond the iThongasi River. Although distinct from Munster, it shares the same postal code.

Glenmore Beach lies along the same stretch as Munster Beach, which can cause confusion, especially since Munster’s swimming and surfing bay is called Glenmore Beach.

In the 2001 and 2011 censuses, Glenmore was grouped under Leisure Crest, while Munster was inexplicably divided into Glenmore and Glenmore Beach.

== Recreation ==
Recreation

Munster Sports Club is a local sports complex offering bowls, tennis, and squash facilities. The area is also home to the Glenmore Ski-Boat Club.

== Transport ==
=== Roads ===
Munster can be accessed by turning off the R61 (to Port Edward and Port Shepstone) onto Munster Road (the single access road into Munster) while Glenmore can be accessed by turning off the R61 onto Kinderstrand Road (the single access road into Glenmore).

=== Air ===
Munster Airfield is a private airfield used only by the farm owner. It is kept in good order and there is a geocache next to it.
