= North Park Nature Reserve =

Protected area in Queensburgh, South Africa

- Location within KwaZulu-Natal
- Location: Queensburgh, South Africa
- Coordinates: 29°52′32″S 30°52′55″E
- Area: 52 ha (130 acres)
- Established: 1968
- Governing body: Ezemvelo KZN Wildlife
- Website: www.kznwildlife.com/north-park-nature-reserve.html

North Park Nature Reserve is a protected area along the banks of the Umhlatuzana River, near Queensburgh in KwaZulu-Natal, South Africa. The park was proclaimed in 1968 and is managed by Ezemvelo KZN Wildlife.

== Flora and fauna ==
The reserve protects riverine and coastal scarp forest, and is known for its birdlife and butterflies. There are a recorded 102 tree species in the reserve, with 48 considered rare. Close to 160 bird species have been recorded, including the Knysna Turaco and Purple Crested Turaco.

A number of small mammals can be found in the reserve, including blue and grey duiker, mongoose, hyrax and cane rats.
