= Messapus (spider) =

Scientific classification
- Domain: Eukaryota
- Kingdom: Animalia
- Phylum: Arthropoda
- Subphylum: Chelicerata
- Class: Arachnida
- Order: Araneae
- Infraorder: Araneomorphae
- Family: Corinnidae
- Genus: Messapus; Simon, 1898

Type species
- M. martini Simon, 1898

Species
- 7, see text

Genus of spiders

Messapus is a genus of African corinnid sac spiders first described by Eugène Simon in 1898.

== Species ==
As of April 2019 it contains seven species:

- Messapus martini Simon, 1898 — Zambia, South Africa
- Messapus megae Haddad & Mbo, 2015 — Zimbabwe
- Messapus meridionalis Haddad & Mbo, 2015 — South Africa
- Messapus natalis (Pocock, 1898) — Mozambique, South Africa
- Messapus seiugatus Haddad & Mbo, 2015 — Guinea
- Messapus tigris Haddad & Mbo, 2015 — Botswana, Namibia
- Messapus tropicus Haddad & Mbo, 2015 — Congo
