= Marina Beach, KwaZulu-Natal =

Coastal village in KwaZulu-Natal, South Africa

Marina Beach
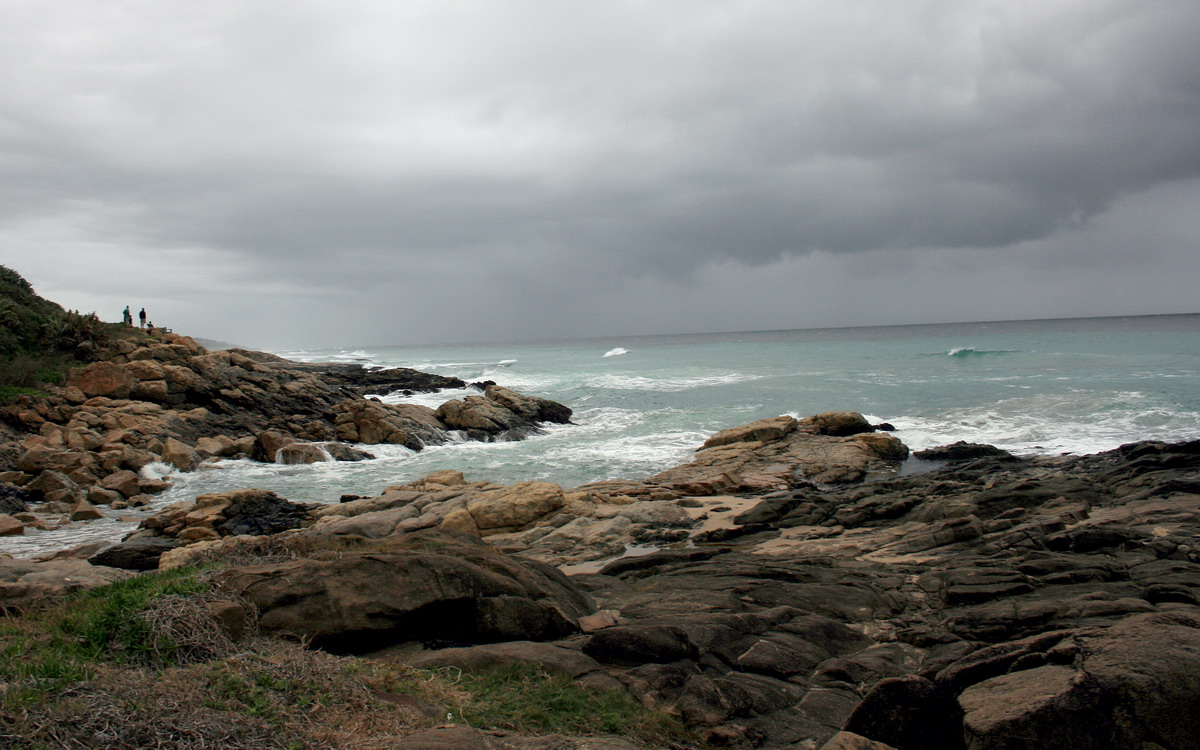

- Location within KwaZulu-Natal Location within South Africa
- Coordinates: 30.935°S 30.304°E
- Country: South Africa
- Province: KwaZulu-Natal
- District: Ugu
- Municipality: Ray Nkonyeni
- Main Place: Southbroom

Area
  - Total: 1.12 km^{2} (0.43 sq mi)

Population (2011)
  - Total: 247
  - Density: 221/km^{2} (571/sq mi)

Racial makeup (2011)
  - Black African: 35.8%
  - White: 61.8%
  - Other: 2.4%

First languages (2011)
  - English: 54.9%
  - Afrikaans: 27.6%
  - Zulu: 6.1%
  - Other: 11.4%
- Time zone: UTC+2 (SAST)
- PO box: 4281
- Area code: 039

Marina Beach is a coastal village and resort on the South Coast of the KwaZulu-Natal province of South Africa, approximately 32 kilometres (20 mi) south-west of Port Shepstone and 19 kilometres (12 mi) north-east of Port Edward. It lies on the mouth of the Kaba River between Southbroom and San Lameer.

== Overview ==
Marina Beach is a quiet and small beachside village often regarded as something of an extension of Southbroom. It is locally referred to as the “Honolulu of the South Coast” due to its subtropical climate, its unspoilt beaches and its abundance of indigenous subtropical vegetation. The only facilities available in Marina Beach are a superette, bottle store and petrol station while the nearest shopping centres are situated in Ramsgate, Margate and Port Edward.

The adjacent San Lameer Golf Estate is often considered part of Marina Beach, as they share the same postal code, despite being statistically recognised as a separate sub-place from Marina Beach.

== Beaches ==
Marina Beach is host to two beaches along its coastline, namely Kent Bay on the mouth of the Kaba River and Marina Beach located further south which is accredited with the international Blue Flag beach status and is home to a tidal pool too.
