= Trafalgar, South Africa =

Seaside Village in KwaZulu-Natal, South Africa

Trafalgar
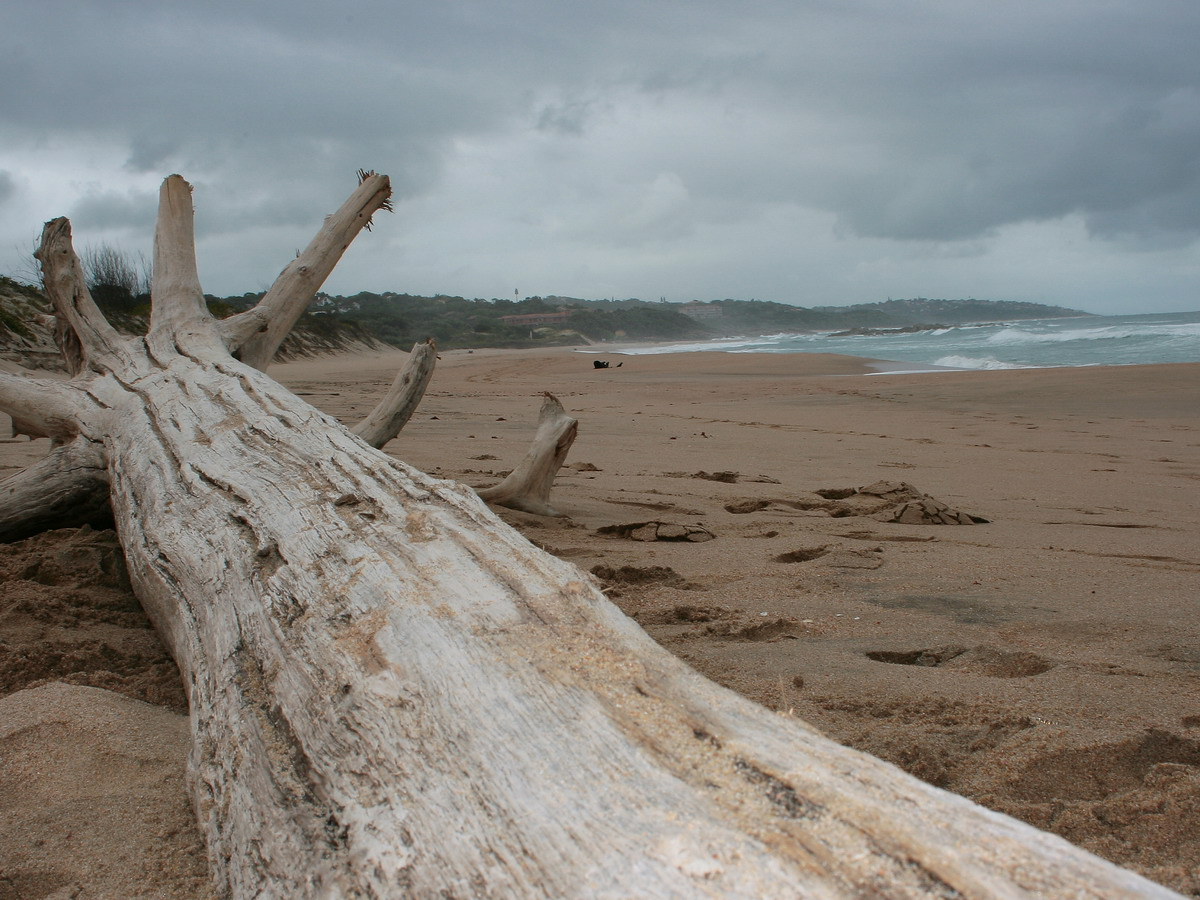
- Trafalgar Beach

- Location within KwaZulu-Natal Location within South Africa
- Coordinates: 30.958°S 30.292°E
- Country: South Africa
- Province: KwaZulu-Natal
- District: Ugu
- Municipality: Ray Nkonyeni
- Main Place: Southbroom

Area
  - Total: 2.63 km^{2} (1.02 sq mi)

Population (2011)
  - Total: 397
  - Density: 151/km^{2} (391/sq mi)

Racial makeup (2011)
  - Black African: 21.4%
  - Coloured: 0.5%
  - White: 78.1%

First languages (2011)
  - English: 50.6%
  - Afrikaans: 35.3%
  - Zulu: 6.5%
  - Xhosa: 3.5%
  - Other: 4.0%
- Time zone: UTC+2 (SAST)
- PO box: 4275

Trafalgar is a seaside resort village in Ugu District Municipality in the KwaZulu-Natal province of South Africa. The village is situated on the northern bank of the Mpenjati river which enters the Indian Ocean at the Mpenjati Nature Reserve.

Trafalgar has a ratepayers’ association composed of local volunteers. The association organizes community initiatives and liaises with municipal officials.

The main beach on the north side of town has a "Blue Flag" designation, meaning that it conforms to international standards regarding water quality and environmental protection and that there is a life guard present. Visitors can park here and access the beach which is a public space. The beach is good for surfing and swimming as well as snorkelling the reef offshore. There are shark nets on this section of beach also. The beach at Mpenjati Nature Reserve has been used by naturists for many years.

There are two restaurants and a local grocer, which bakes fresh bread and pastry, daily. Shopping and services are easily accessible at the nearby towns of Southbroom, Shelly Beach and Port Edward. There is a private hospital at Shelly Beach.

== Transport ==
Trafalgar can be accessed by turning off the R61 (to Port Edward and Port Shepstone) onto Trafalgar Drive, the single access road into village. Direct, scheduled, flights to Johannesburg are available at Margate Airport, 22 km away. The N2 Road from Durban is well maintained and is in good condition, making the town easily accessible.
