= Mpenjati Nature Reserve =

Nature reserve ion the south coast of KwaZulu-Natal, South Africa

- Location within South Africa
- Coordinates: 30°58′21″S 30°17′03″E
- Area: 66 hectares (160 acres)

The Mpenjati Nature Reserve is situated on the KwaZulu-Natal South Coast 20 kilometres (12 mi) south of Margate. The reserve lies on the Mpenjati River Lagoon.

The residential town of Trafalgar is on the northern border of the reserve, and Palm Beach lies to the south.

The 66 hectares (160 acres) reserve is managed by Ezemvelo KZN Wildlife, and consists of a system of interconnecting riverine and floodplain marsh habitats, areas of coastal forest, coastal grasslands and open coastline, as well as the river estuary.

In the reserve the following bird species may be seen: water thick-knee, osprey, swift tern, half-collared kingfisher, Kittlitz's plover, African black oystercatcher, giant kingfisher, black-bellied starling, red-capped robin-chat, white-browed scrub robin, brown scrub robin, black-backed puffback, forest canary, green twinspot, orange-breasted bushshrike and grey-headed bushshrike.

The Mpenjati River Lagoon is also a popular venue for water-based recreation including angling, boating and swimming. The beach in the reserve has been used by nudists for over 20 years and was proclaimed as a nude beach in October 2014. In November 2017 the Public Protector declared that the proclamation of the beach as a nudist beach by the Municipality and did not follow proper procedures and prescripts. The beach continues to be used by naturists, even though the beach is not an official nudist beach. (Note: "The reality is that nudists will continue their pilgrimage to Mpenjati Beach, and the local government will continue to ‘turn a blind eye’ to the nudist transgression".)

Mpenjati has two picnic sites, one on each bank of the river, the picnic sites have braai facilities, toilets, and a children's playground.
