= KwaZulu-Natal coastal lowland forest =

Subtropical forest type from low-lying coastal areas of KwaZulu-Natal, South Africa

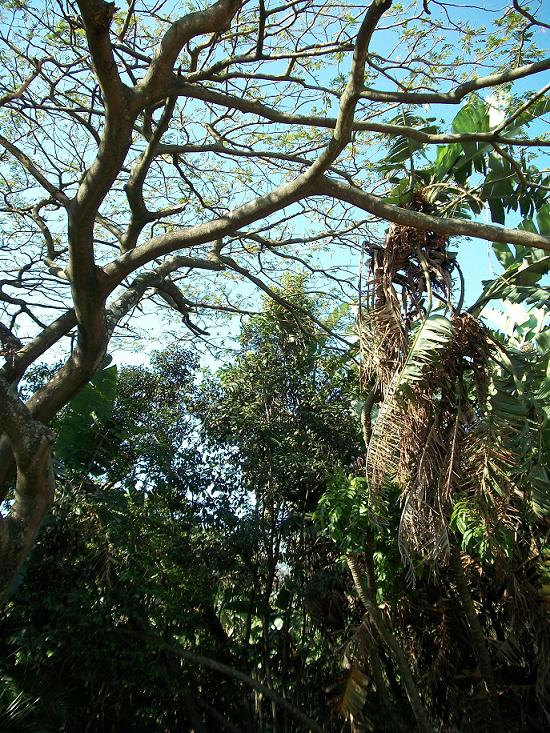
Coastal lowland forest in Amanzimtoti

KwaZulu-Natal coastal lowland forest is a subtropical forest type that was once found almost continuously along the low-lying coastal areas of KwaZulu-Natal, South Africa. It still exists in protected areas, but much has been cleared for sugar-cane plantations and housing developments.

== List of trees (incomplete) ==
- Albizia adianthifolia - Flat-crown
- Bridelia micrantha - Coastal Goldenleaf
- Celtis africana - White Stinkwood
- Chaetachme aristata - Thorny Elm
- Croton sylvaticus - Forest Fever-berry
- Deinbollia oblongifolia - Dune Soap-berry
- Donella viridifolia - Fluted Milkwood
- Ekebergia capensis - Cape Ash
- Englerophytum natalense - Natal Milkplum
- Ficus natalensis - Natal Fig
- Margaritaria discoidea - Common Pheasant-berry
- Phoenix reclinata - Wild Date Palm
- Protorhus longifolia - Red Beech
- Strelitzia nicolai - Natal Wild Banana
- Trema orientalis - Pigeonwood
- Trichilia dregeana - Forest Mahogany
- Xylotheca kraussiana - African Dog-rose

== Bibliography ==
- Carruthers, V. (2001). Sasol First Field Guide to Frogs. ISBN 978-1-86872-595-3
- Pooley, E. (1993). The Complete Field Guide to Trees of Natal, Zululand and Transkei. ISBN 0-620-17697-0.
- Pooley, E. (1998). A Field Guide to Wild Flowers; KwaZulu-Natal and the Eastern Region. ISBN 0-620-21500-3.
- Pooley, T. and Player, I. (1995). KwaZulu-Natal Wildlife Destinations. ISBN 1-86812-487-8.
- van Oudtshoorn, F. (1992). Guide to Grasses of South Africa. ISBN 0-620-16539-1.

== See also ==
- Forests of KwaZulu-Natal
