= Umtamvuna Nature Reserve =

Coastal nature reserve in South Africa

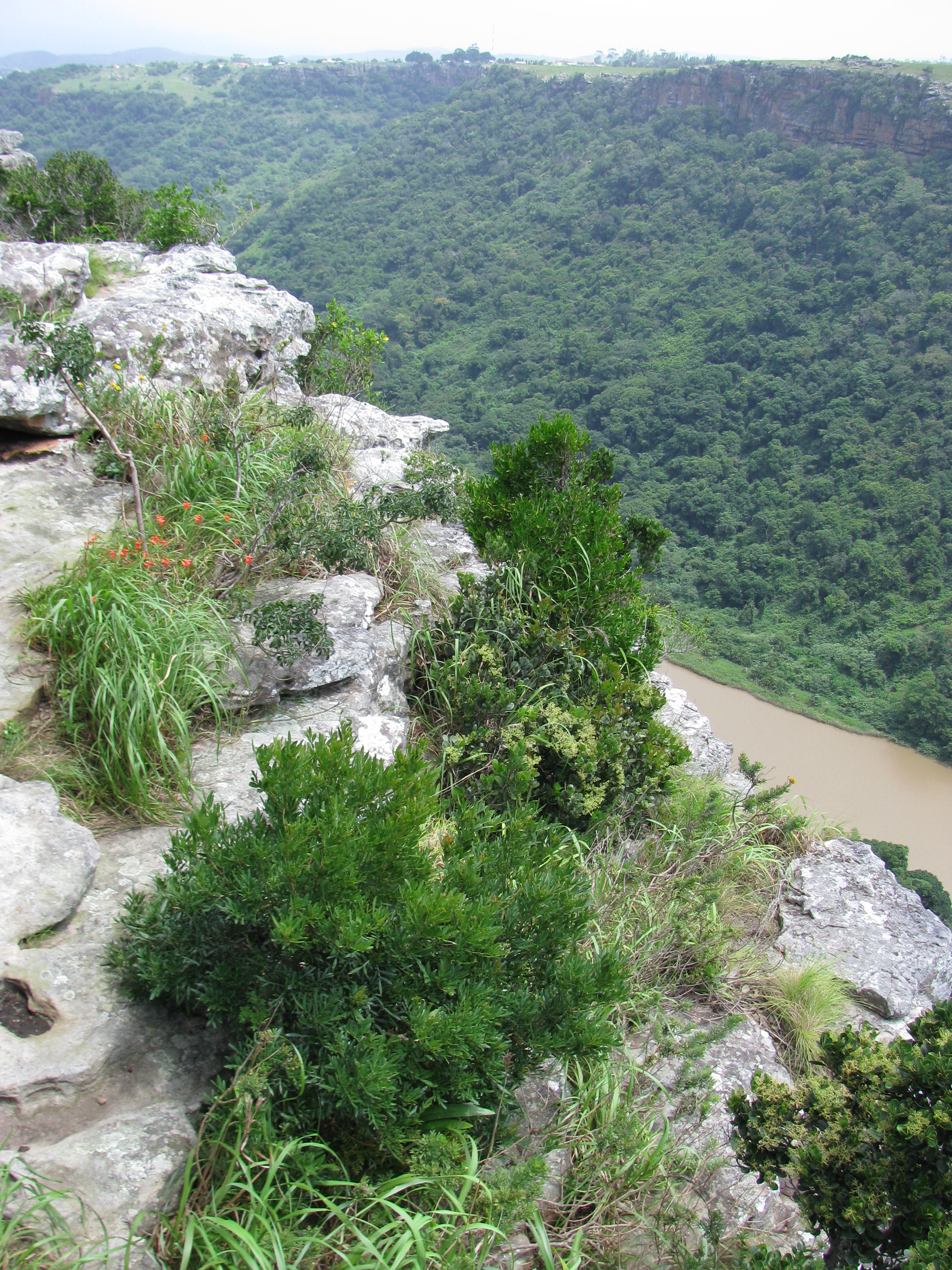
- The gorge in the southern section of the reserve seen from the Clearwater Trail lookout
- Interactive map of Umtamvuna Nature Reserve
- Type: Nature reserve
- Location: KwaZulu-Natal, South Africa
- Nearest city: Port Edward, South Africa
- Coordinates: 31.01°S 30.16°E
- Area: 3,257 hectares (8,050 acres)
- Established: 1971
- Administrator: Ezemvelo KZN Wildlife

The Umtamvuna Nature Reserve is situated in South Africa on the KwaZulu-Natal side of the Mtamvuna River, and is managed by Ezemvelo KZN Wildlife. The reserve is 3,257 hectares in extent and was established on 25 July 1971.

== Description ==
The reserve includes a section of the Mtamvuna River, and surrounding cliffs and plateaus, from the outskirts of the town of Port Edward to 19 km inland. The total river frontage in the reserve is about 28 km. The reserve also includes the Bulolo River; a tributary of the Mtamvuna. The reserve's 14 km nature trail is suitable for adept and well-prepared hikers.

The plateau areas consist of grasslands (Pondoland Sourveld), which drop off into Coastal Scarp Forest in the gorge along the river below. Some of the cliff-faces are up to 240 m high, and a colony of Cape vultures is said to nest on them. The cliffs were formed by the river incising into Natal Group Sandstone, and many endemic plants grow on this substrate and the soils derived from it. The grassland areas of the reserve are known for their natural display of wildflowers in late spring, depending on rainfall and burns.

== Wildlife ==
Animals in the reserve include

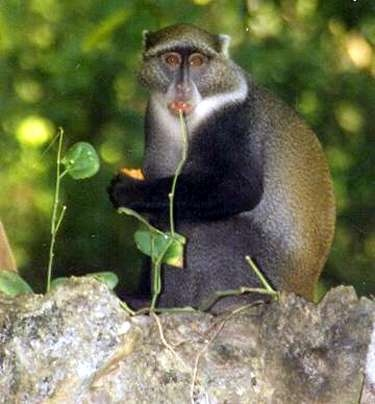
Samango monkey

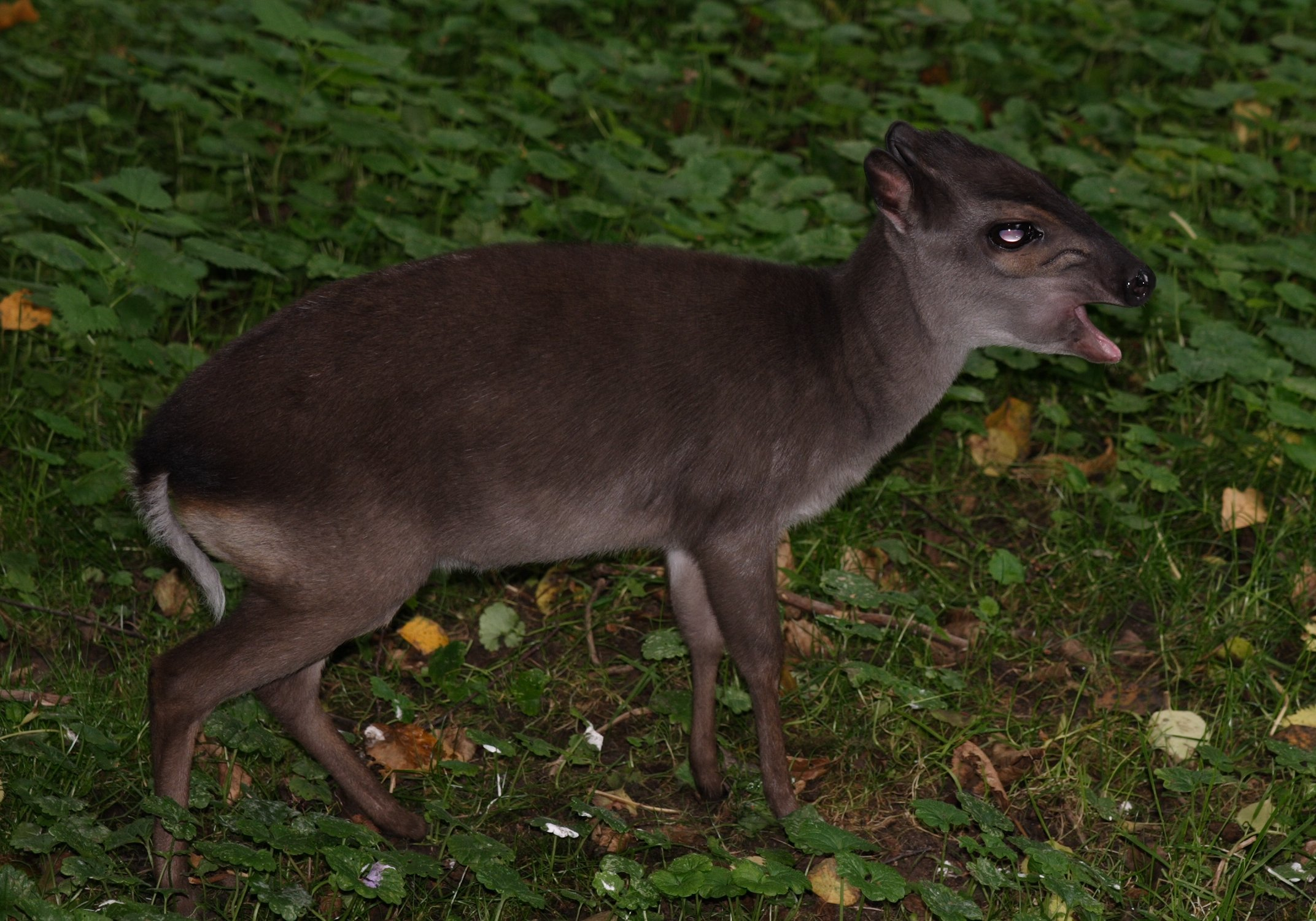
Blue duiker

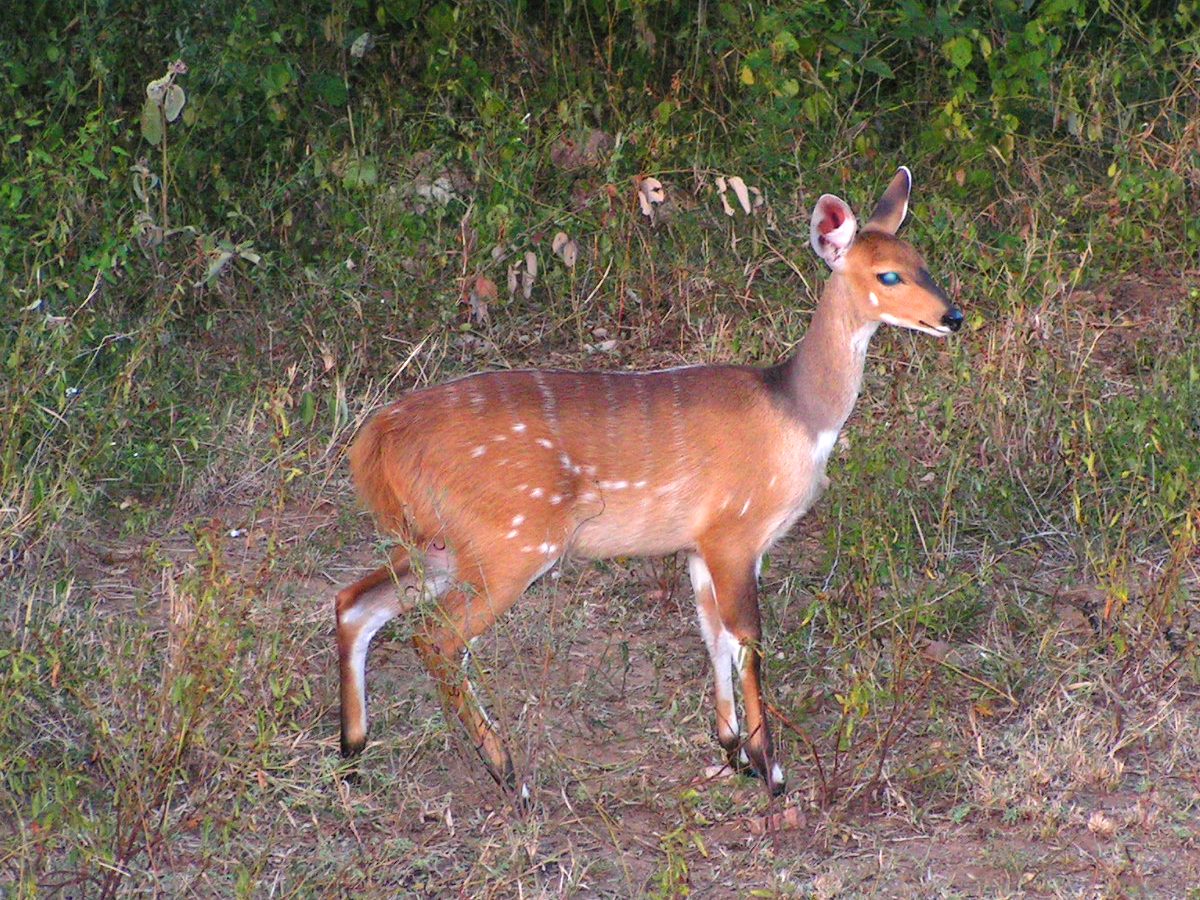
Bushbuck

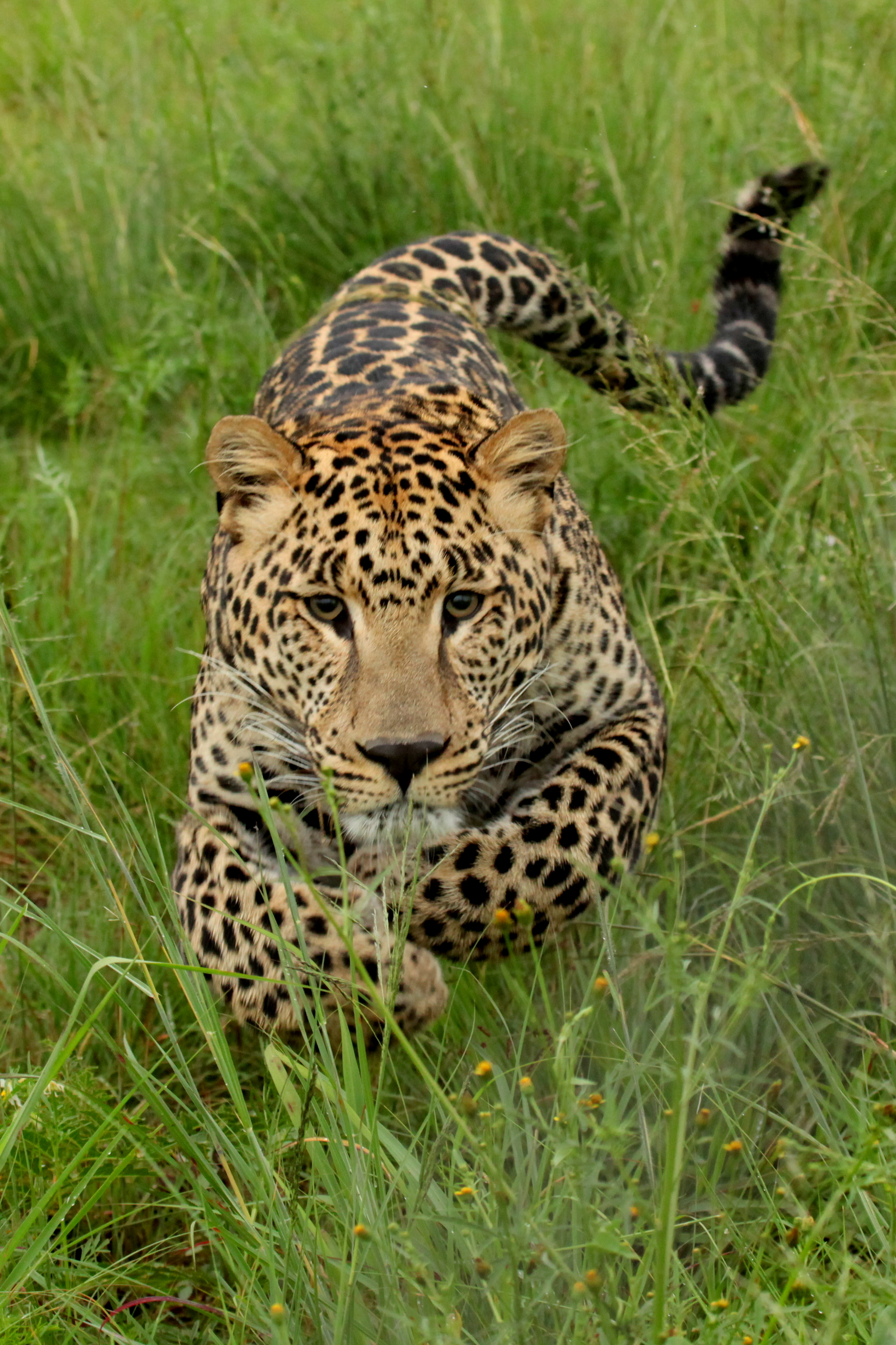
Leopard

== See also ==
- Forests of KwaZulu-Natal
