= Violence-free zone =

Violence-Free Zones, or Violence-Free Zone Initiatives, are community-based interventions for gang members and youth. Zones attempt to stem violence by providing mentorship, guidance, social development, job training and an effective environment for learning, among other tools, to help gang members and at-risk youth break free and become successful in life, crime-free and violence-free. The initiatives operate in urban schools with high levels of crime and violence.

The model for Violence-Free Zones was developed by the Center for Neighborhood Enterprise and is based on the principle that lack of parental involvement and guidance is at the root of violence among youth in these high-risk communities.

Participating cities include Washington, D.C., Hartford, Indianapolis, Los Angeles, Dallas, Houston, Milwaukee, Richmond (Virginia) and others.

The model has also been adopted as a strategy to prevent HIV/AIDS transmission in schools.

== Program components ==
Each Violence-Free Zone engages youth-oriented organizations in the area to become "Community Partners." These organizations must have the trust and confidence of local youth. Key to the program are Youth Advisors, young adults from the neighborhood who have overcome similar obstacles and have the respect of students. The Advisors work in the schools, coaching and mediating, and serve as mentors to the most troubled students. Community Partners and the school work together to provide guidance, social development, job readiness programs. Training, oversight, and technical assistance for the program administrators is provided by the Center for Neighborhood Enterprise.

== Results ==
The initiative has been found to have measurable success in each targeted metric, from school absences and incidents to police arrests. Independent evaluations, including a study by Baylor University, have shown declines in each zone from 4% to 61%.
