= Port Edward, South Africa =

Seaside town in KwaZulu-Natal, South Africa

Port Edward
- Town
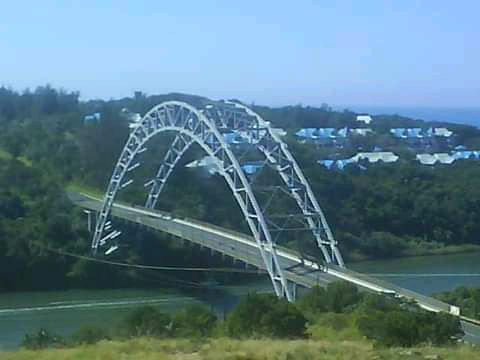
- C. H. Mitchell Bridge crossing over the Mtamvuna River south of Port Edward

- Location within KwaZulu-Natal Location within South Africa
- Coordinates: 31°03′00″S 30°13′00″E
- Country: South Africa
- Province: KwaZulu-Natal
- District: Ugu
- Municipality: Ray Nkonyeni

Area
  - Total: 24.18 km^{2} (9.34 sq mi)

Population (2011)
  - Total: 4,409
  - Density: 182.3/km^{2} (472.3/sq mi)

Racial makeup (2011)
  - Black African: 30.9%
  - Coloured: 2.7%
  - Indian/Asian: 5.2%
  - White: 60.6%
  - Other: 0.6%

First languages (2011)
  - English: 49.6%
  - Afrikaans: 24.0%
  - Xhosa: 11.8%
  - Zulu: 10.8%
  - Other: 3.8%
- Time zone: UTC+2 (SAST)
- PO box: 4295
- Area code: 039

Port Edward is a small resort town situated on the south coast of KwaZulu-Natal in South Africa and lies on the border between KwaZulu-Natal and the Eastern Cape. It is situated on the R61 road (future N2 Wild Coast Toll Route) between Port Shepstone and Lusikisiki.

== History ==
In 1552, the Portuguese carrack São João ran aground at Port Edward and this is the first time in recorded history that peoples from Europe met peoples from South Africa.

In 1831 there was a crisis between the settlers in Port Natal (Durban) and Dingane, the Zulu king. Some settlers boarded a ship that was in the harbour and the others, including Henry Francis Fynn and his family, fled down the coast. The Zulu warriors caught up with them where Port Edward is today and massacred the fleeing settlers, which included local tribespeople of Langeni, on a hill called Isandlundlu (in English, shaped like a hut). The place has been known ever since as Tragedy Hill and its slopes are still littered with the bones of the victims.

In 1878, the ship "The Ivy" ran aground on Leisure Bay area beach.

In 1925, the area was partly owned by TK Pringle, and he named the inland portion Banner Rest as this was where he wished to "strike his banner". The village was laid out and was named Port Edward in honour of the Prince of Wales, who later became King Edward VIII.

The first holiday cottage in Port Edward was a shack built among the sand dunes in the early days by transport rider Edward Stafford. Unaware of their motility, however, he was surprised and dismayed to see his fine creation swallowed up. The area was subjected to several name changes as property was bought and sold, but the practice came to an end in 1852 when the town of Port Edward was ceremoniously dedicated to the then Prince of Wales.

== Geography ==
=== Location ===
Port Edward is the southernmost town of KwaZulu-Natal and lies north of the Mtamvuna River which separates KwaZulu-Natal from the Eastern Cape. It is situated approximately 46 kilometres (29 mi) south-west of Port Shepstone by road and 153 kilometres (95 mi) south-west of Durban by road.

=== Suburbs ===
The 2011 census divided the main place of Port Edward into 16 “sub places” including:

- Banners Rest
- Black Rock
- Doc Wilson Point
- Ekubo Coastal Estate
- Glenmore
- Ivy Beach
- Leisure Bay
- Leisure Crest
- Meadowbrook
- Munster
- North Sand Bluff
- Palm Beach
- Rennies Beach
- Rocklands
- Salmon Bay
- Three Hills

== Tourism ==
Port Edward is a tourist resort for seasonal visitors from inland regions of South Africa.

There are many tourist seasons that influence Port Edward but the most significant is the Christmas/ New Year period spanning from early December to mid-January. Port Edward's Silver Beach hosts an annual New Year's Eve party frequented by youths whilst on New Year's Day itself, families populate the beach for continued celebrations.

Holiday accommodation is a particularly important source of income for the region throughout the year.

=== Beaches ===
Beaches in the greater Port Edward area include:

- Black Rock Beach
- Dassie Beach
- Glenmore Beach
- Ivy Beach
- Kidds Beach
- Leisure Beach
- Munster Beach
- Palm Beach
- Port Edward Main Beach/Silver Beach – includes a ski boat launch facility and ablution facilities
- Portobello Beach
- Rennies Beach
- Salmon Bay Beach
- Splash Rock – a popular fishing destination and fishing is one of the most popular sports in Port Edward
- Spiros Rocks Beach
- T.O. Beach/Strand

=== Attractions ===
- Beaver Creek Coffee Estate is a coffee plantation just outside Port Edward on Izingolweni Road. It includes a café on site and also offers visitors a daily tour of the distinctive flavours of the world's coffee regions and how the coffee production works.
- Red Desert Nature Conservation Reserve is a national heritage site and is reputed to be the smallest desert in the world with a width of just 200m, and is also used for hiking and mountain biking through the extra-terrestrial terrain.
- Tragedy Hill is a sightseeing spot overlooking Silver Beach. It was named after a massacre whereby Zulu warriors massacred the family of pioneer Henry Flynn due to confusion over stolen cattle. The heartbroken Zulu King ordered the man who started the rumour to be executed by one of the surviving settlers who was given 5 heads of cattle as a reward.
- uMtamvuna Nature Reserve is a nature reserve located on the banks of the uMtamvuna River on the outskirts of Port Edward.
- Wild Coast Sun is a casino and resort located on the Eastern Cape side of the uMtamvuna River. It includes an 18-hole golf course and the famous Wild Waves Water Park which offers a variety of water sports.

=== Sardine Run ===
Another main season coincides with the Sardine run natural phenomenon usually occurring from late May to mid-July.

== Schools ==
There are various small schools in Port Edward, some consisting of only 50+ children; however the most popular of these schools is Port Edward Primary School.

== Golf ==
The 9-hole Port Edward Country Club is the main golf course in Port Edward. However, larger and nearby 18-hole golf courses within the South Coast region include Wild Coast Sun, San Lameer, Southbroom Golf Club, Margate Country Club and Port Shepstone Country Club which are highly ranked by both Golf Digest and The Compleat Golfer.

== Transport ==
=== Air ===
The nearest airport is the Margate Airport approximately 32 kilometres (19,9 mi) north-east of Port Edward. The airport offers one scheduled direct route to Johannesburg operated by CemAir. The nearest international airport is the King Shaka International Airport (KSIA) just north of Durban and is approximately 196 kilometres (121,8 mi) north-east of Port Edward. KSIA offers numerous domestic flights around South Africa, regional flights around Southern Africa as well as intercontinental flights to the Middle East.

=== Road ===
The R61 is the main route that passes through Port Edward, connecting Port Shepstone to the north with Mbizana and Mthatha to the south-west. The P284 (Izingolweni Road) which was recently rehabilitated in 2024 is a small rural road connecting Port Edward with the N2 (to Kokstad) in Izingolweni, approximately 37 km (23 mi) to the north-west.

== See also ==
- Black December
