= Palm Beach, South Africa =

Palm Beach
- Location within KwaZulu-Natal Location within South Africa
- Coordinates: 30.988°S 30.272°E
- Country: South Africa
- Province: KwaZulu-Natal
- District: Ugu
- Municipality: Ray Nkonyeni
- Main Place: Port Edward

Area
  - Total: 3.87 km^{2} (1.49 sq mi)

Population (2011)
  - Total: 529
  - Density: 137/km^{2} (354/sq mi)

Racial makeup (2011)
  - Black African: 11.5%
  - Coloured: 6.4%
  - Indian/Asian: 4.2%
  - White: 77.7%
  - Other: 0.2%

First languages (2011)
  - English: 64.1%
  - Afrikaans: 26.6%
  - Zulu: 6.3%
  - Xhosa: 2.5%
  - Other: 0.6%
- Time zone: UTC+2 (SAST)
- PO box: 4275

Palm Beach is a seaside village on the South Coast of KwaZulu-Natal, South Africa.

== Etymology ==
Palm Beach is named after the Ilala Palm (hyphaene critina), a species indigenous to sub-tropical Southern Africa and used by rural communities for centuries. The trees' leaves are used for woven rooftops, baskets and mats and the sap is used for liquor.

== Geography ==
Palm Beach is located on the southern bank of the Mpenjati River which enters the Indian Ocean at the Mpenjati Nature Reserve. The nature reserve itself surrounds the Mpenjati River lagoon and extends some 500 metres out to sea in order to protect the unique fossil found in the area.

== Beach ==
Palm Beach boasts a beach with its own natural tidal pool and nearby estuary.

== Kitesurfing ==
Palm Beach has been and continues to be rated as one of the best wind sport wave riding venues in the world although it is not exploited much by kitesurfers.

Palm Beach is a microcosm on its own. It is in fact the combination of an outer reef, a rocky outcrop in the form of a point and a river system that feeds sand into the equation that makes this place unique. The outer reef transforms the ocean swells into sought after waves while at the same time disarming the waves' explosive energy.
