= Oribi Gorge =

Canyon in South Africa

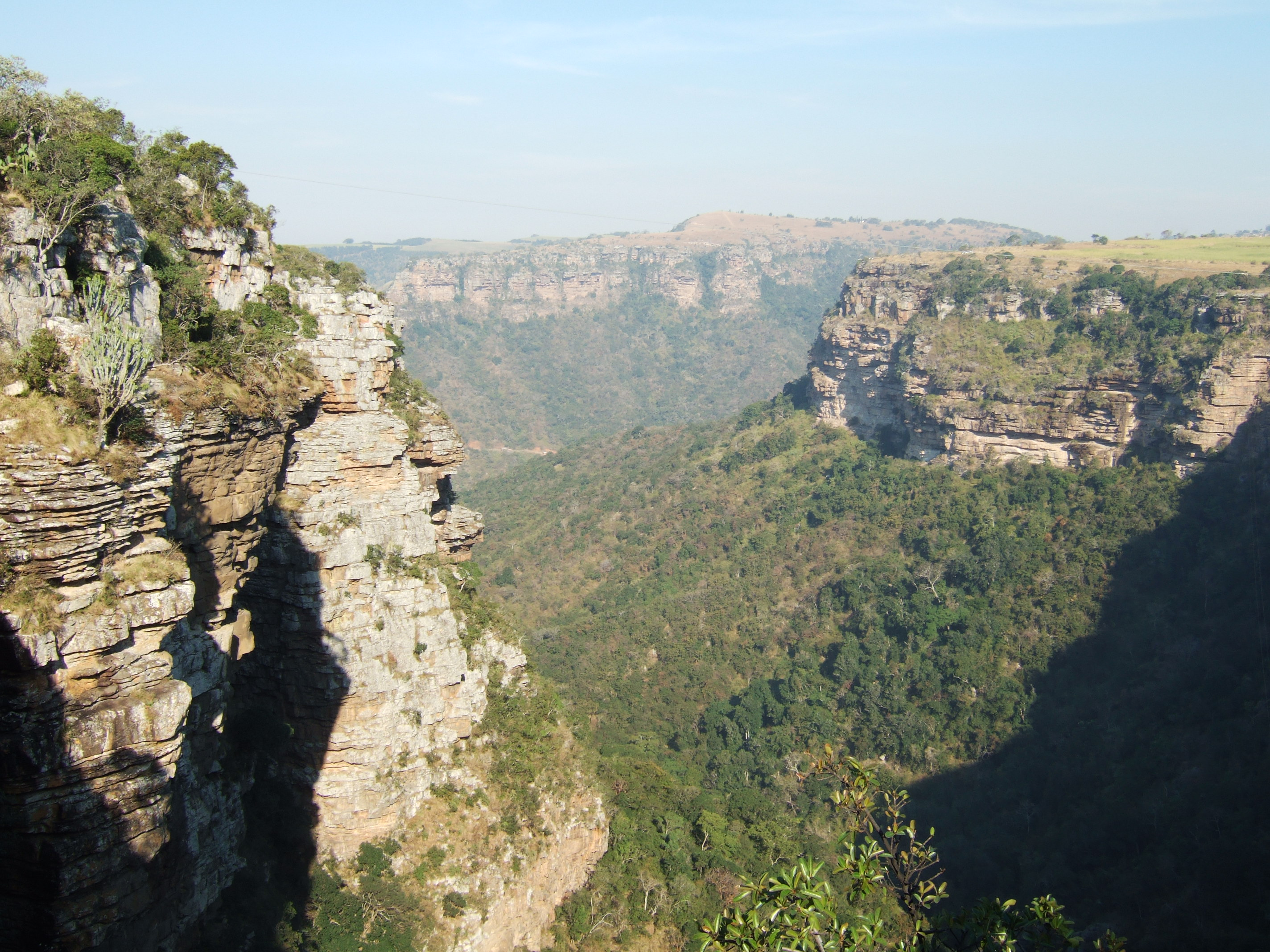
- View from near Baboon's Castle, Oribi gorge

- Location within KwaZulu-Natal
- Location: KwaZulu-Natal, South Africa
- Coordinates: 30°43′11″S 30°16′12″E

Oribi Gorge is a canyon in southern KwaZulu-Natal, South Africa, 35 kilometres north-west of Port Shepstone, which itself is 120 km south of Durban. Oribi Gorge, cut by the Mzimkulwana River, is the eastern gorge of two gorges that cut through the Oribi Flats (flat sugarcane farmlands) of KwaZulu-Natal. The western gorge was formed by the Mzimkulu River. The gorge is approximately 400 metres (1,300 ft) deep, and almost 5 kilometres (3.1 mi) wide at its widest.

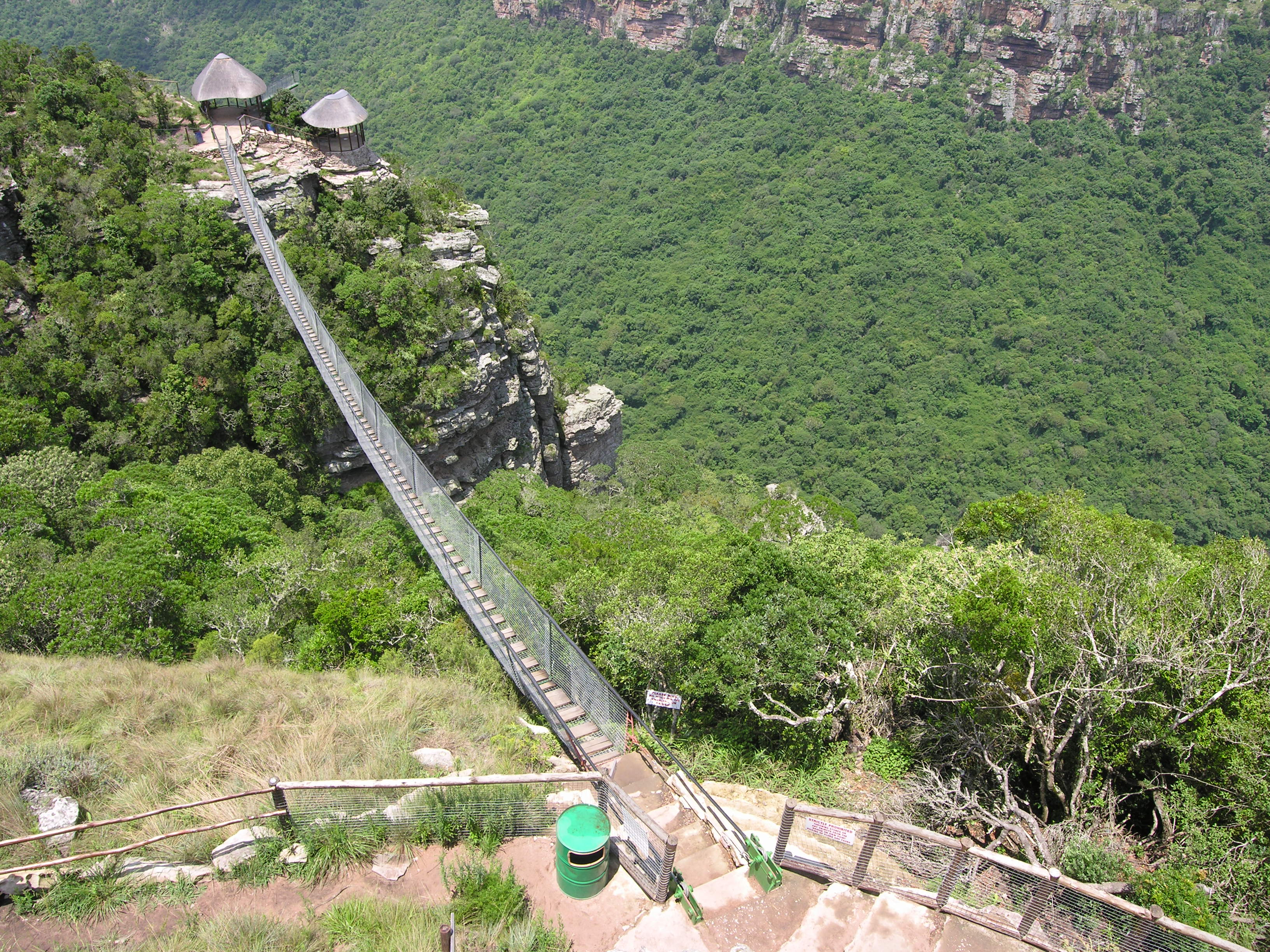
Oribi Gorge suspension bridge

Erosion by these rivers have carved out nearly 30 kilometres (19 mi) of spectacular kloofs and crags, covered with subtropical vegetation. In the gorge, the dense forest on the sandstone slopes is home to various small mammals, while the large leguaans excavate their burrows along the riverbanks.

At the base of the cliffs of both gorges the basement rocks are part of the Namaqua-Natal Metamorphic Province, which is over 1000 million years old. The cliffs themselves are formed by Msikaba formation sandstones deposited by fluvial environment about 365 million years ago. Downstream from the gorges, is a large surface mine producing cement from a limestone deposit. The road through Oribi Gorge was built by Italian prisoners of war.

Oribi Gorge derives its name from the oribi, a small antelope that lives in the gorges.

== Oribi Gorge Nature Reserve ==
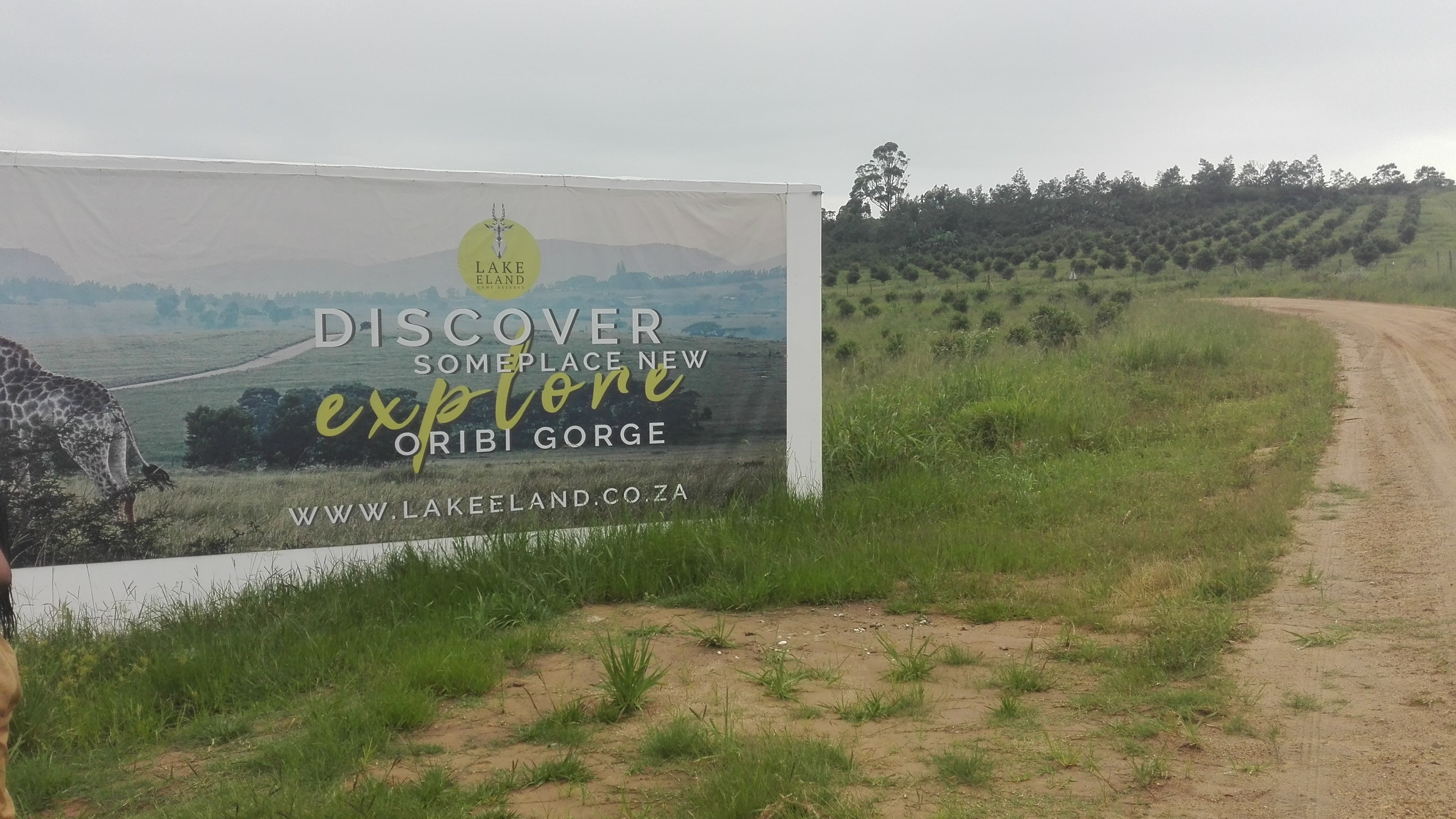
Oribi Gorge

Oribi Gorge Nature Reserve is a park located along the bottom of the Oribi Gorge at the confluence of the Mzimkulu River and Mximkulwana River, being approximately 27 kilometres (17 mi) long, and 1 kilometre (0.62 mi) wide at its widest point. It was proclaimed a protected state forest in 1950.

== Animals ==
In addition to the oribi and monitor lizards, vertebrates include bushbuck, duiker, reedbuck, vervet monkeys, Samango monkeys, various frogs and turtles.

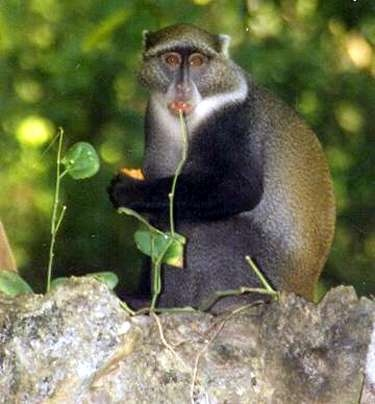
Samango monkey

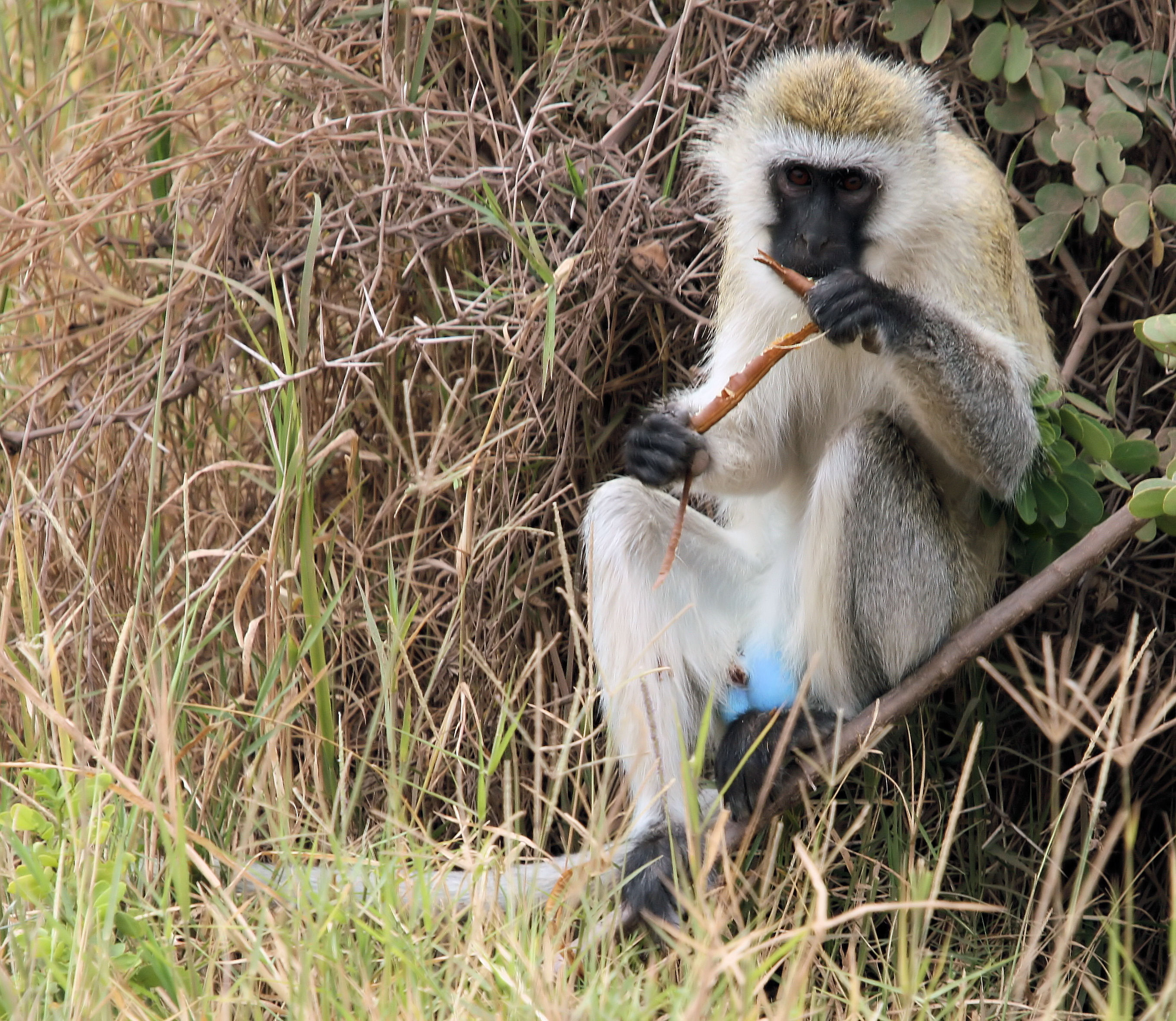
vervet monkey

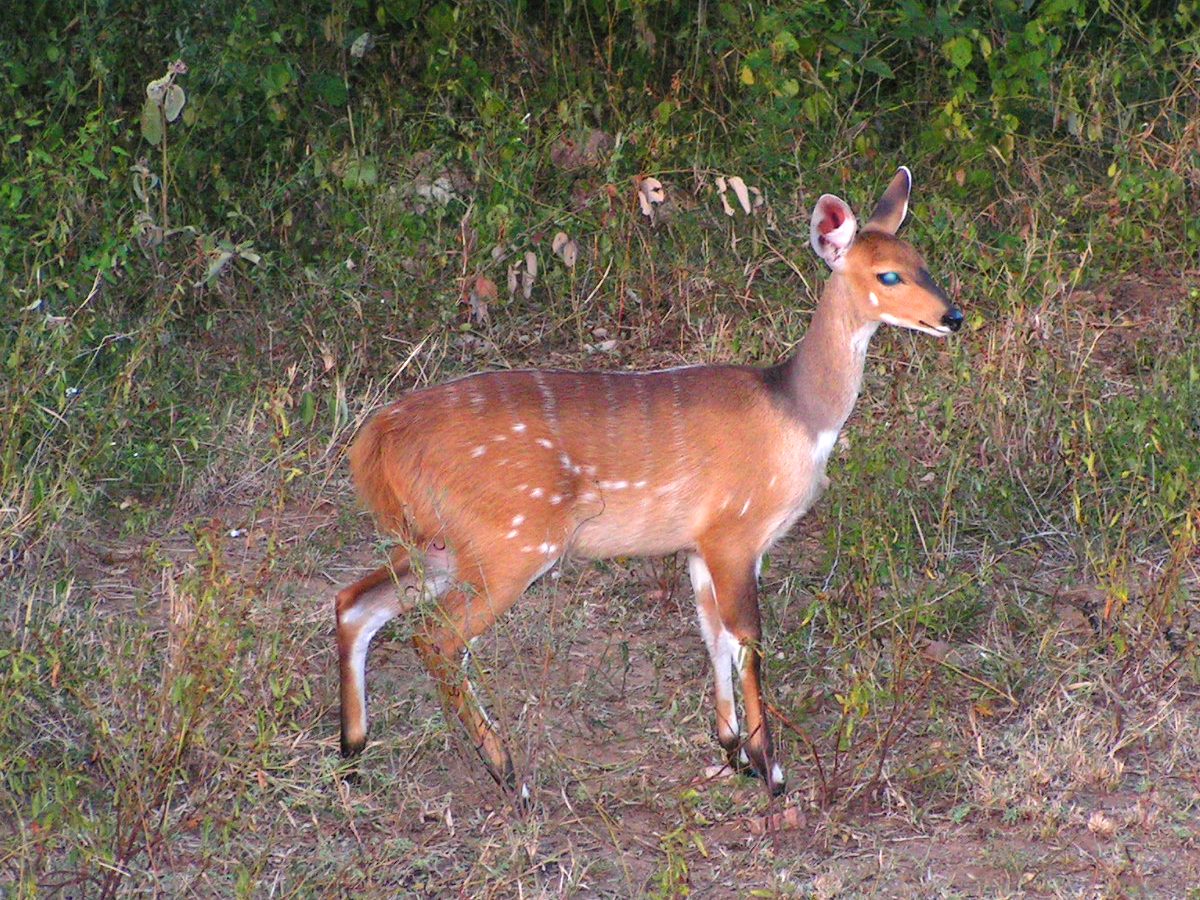
bushbuck

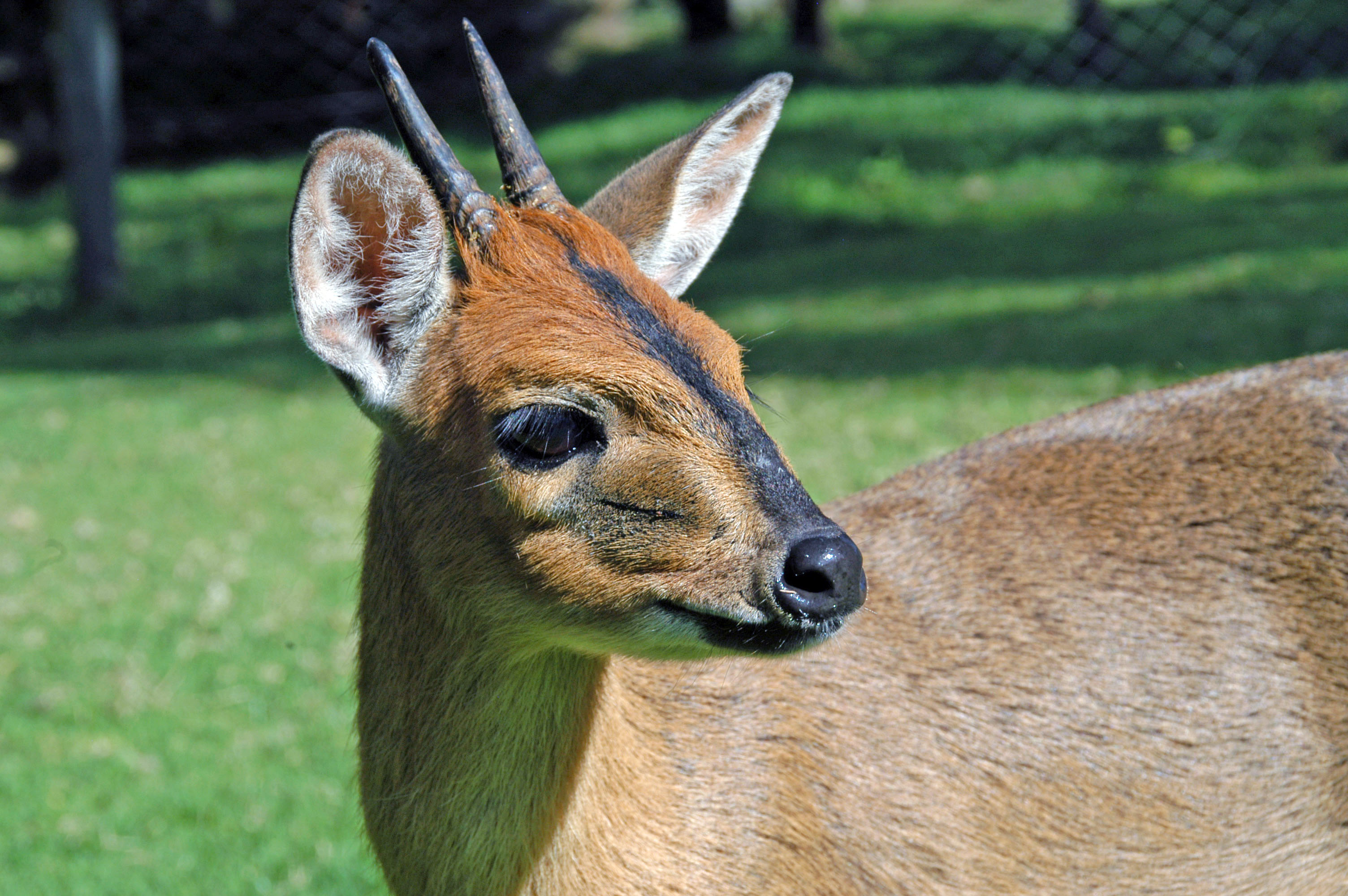
duiker

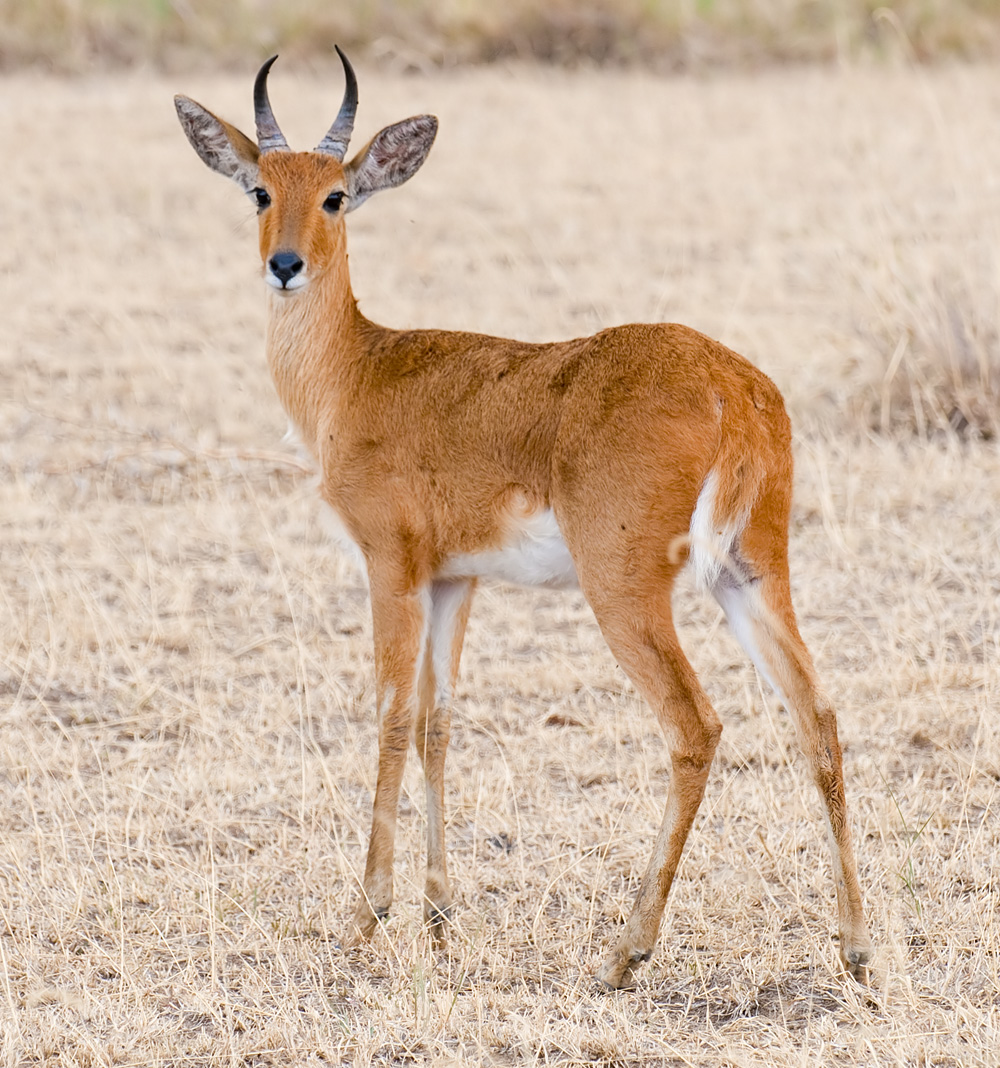
reedbuck

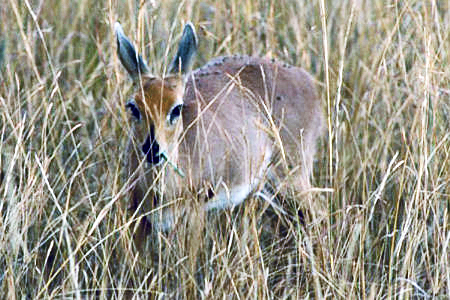
oribi

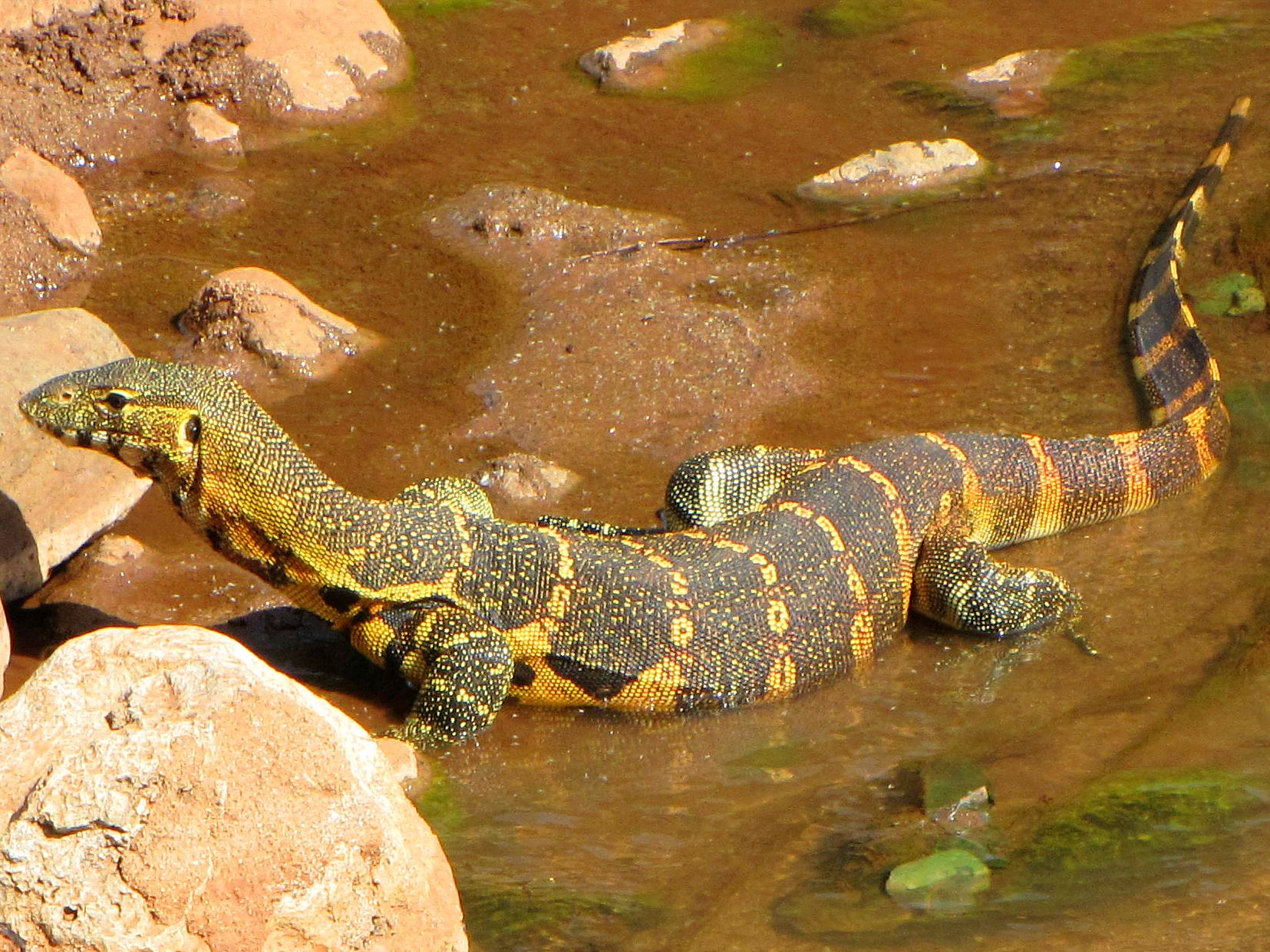
monitor lizard
