= South African Class NG G16 2-6-2+2-6-2 =

1937 articulated narrow-gauge steam locomotive

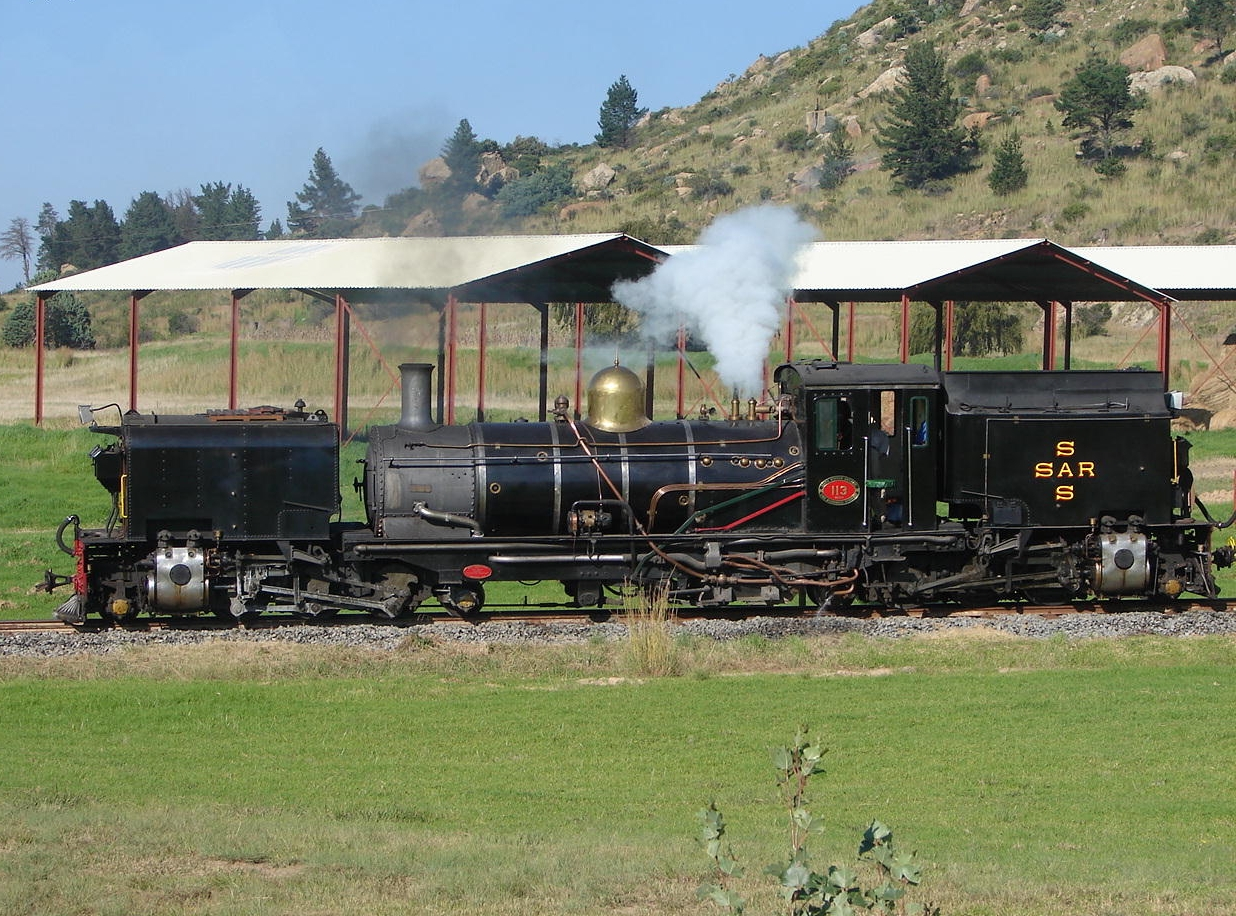
- No. NG113 at Sandstone Estates in April 2006
Type and origin
- ♠ All except no. NG137-NG143 ♥ All except no. NG137-NG143 & NG149-NG156 ♣ No. NG137-NG143 – ♦ No. NG149-NG156
- Power type: Steam
- Designer: Hannoversche Maschinenbau AG; South African Railways
- Builder: Société Anonyme John Cockerill; Beyer, Peacock & Company; Hunslet-Taylor
- Serial number: Cockerill 3265-3268; Beyer, Peacock 6919-6926, 7426-7432, 7862-7868; Hunslet-Taylor 3894-3901
- Model: Class NG G16
- Build date: 1937-1968
- Total produced: 34
- Rebuilder: Alfred County Railway
- Rebuild date: 1989-1990
- Number rebuilt: 2 to Class NG G16A
Specifications
- Configuration
  - Whyte: 2-6-2+2-6-2
  - UIC: 1'C1'+1'C1'h4t
- Driver: 3rd & 4th coupled axles
- Gauge: 2 ft (610 mm) narrow
- Leading dia.: 21 in (533 mm)
- Coupled dia.: 33 in (838 mm)
- Trailing dia.: 21 in (533 mm)
- Minimum curve: 160 ft (49 m)
- Wheelbase: 43 ft 3 in (13,183 mm)
  - Engine: 13 ft 10 1/2 in (4,229 mm) each
  - Coupled: 6 ft 3 in (1,905 mm) each
- Pivot centres: 23 ft 9 in (7,239 mm)
- Length
  - Over couplers: 48 ft 5 1/4 in (14,764 mm)
- Width: 7 ft (2,134 mm)
- Height: 10 ft 4 in (3,150 mm)
- Frame type: Bar
- Axle load: ♠ 6 LT 18 cwt (7,011 kg) ♣ 6 LT 17 cwt 3 qtr (6,998 kg)
  - Leading: ♠ 6 LT 10 cwt (6,604 kg) front 5 LT 14 cwt (5,791 kg) rear ♣ 6 LT 7 cwt 2 qtr (6,477 kg) front 6 LT 7 cwt 1 qtr (6,465 kg) rear
  - 1st coupled: ♠ 6 LT 18 cwt (7,011 kg) ♣ 6 LT 14 cwt 3 qtr (6,846 kg)
  - 2nd coupled: ♠ 6 LT 6 cwt (6,401 kg) ♣ 6 LT 17 cwt 3 qtr (6,998 kg)
  - 3rd coupled: ♠ 6 LT 4 cwt (6,299 kg) ♣ 6 LT 15 cwt (6,858 kg)
  - 4th coupled: ♠ 6 LT 15 cwt (6,858 kg) ♣ 6 LT 14 cwt 2 qtr (6,833 kg)
  - 5th coupled: ♠ 6 LT 17 cwt (6,960 kg) ♣ 6 LT 14 cwt (6,808 kg)
  - 6th coupled: ♠ 6 LT 1 cwt (6,147 kg) ♣ 6 LT 14 cwt 3 qtr (6,846 kg)
  - Trailing: ♠ 3 LT 14 cwt (3,759 kg) front 3 LT 19 cwt (4,013 kg) rear ♣ 4 LT 1 cwt 1 qtr (4,128 kg) front 3 LT 10 cwt (3,556 kg) rear
- Adhesive weight: ♠ 39 LT 1 cwt (39,680 kg) ♣ 40 LT 10 cwt 3 qtr (41,190 kg)
- Loco weight: ♠ 59 LT 2 cwt (60,050 kg) ♣ 61 LT 5 cwt 2 qtr (62,260 kg)
- Fuel type: Coal
- Fuel capacity: ♠ 4 LT (4.1 t) ♣ 6 LT 4 cwt (6.3 t)
- Water cap.: ♥ 1,285 imp gal (5,840 L) front 540 imp gal (2,450 L) rear ♣ 1,325 imp gal (6,020 L) front ♦ 1,325 imp gal (6,020 L) front 540 imp gal (2,450 L) rear
- Firebox
  - Type: Round-top
  - Grate area: 19.5 sq ft (1.81 m^{2})
- Boiler
  - Pitch: 5 ft 5 in (1,651 mm)
  - Diameter: 4 ft 7 3/4 in (1,416 mm)
  - Tube plates: 9 ft 3 5/8 in (2,835 mm)
  - Small tubes: 152: 1 3/4 in (44 mm)
  - Large tubes: 15: 5 1/2 in (140 mm)
- Boiler pressure: 180 psi (1,241 kPa)
- Safety valve: Pop
- Heating surface
  - Firebox: 82.1 sq ft (7.63 m^{2})
  - Tubes: 839 sq ft (77.9 m^{2})
  - Total surface: 921.1 sq ft (85.57 m^{2})
- Superheater
  - Heating area: 149 sq ft (13.8 m^{2})
- Cylinders: 4
- Cylinder size: 12 in (305 mm) bore 16 in (406 mm) stroke
- Valve gear: Walschaerts
- Valve type: Piston
- Couplers: Bell-and-hook (Cape); Johnston link-and-pin (Natal)
Performance figures
- Tractive effort: 18,850 lbf (83.8 kN) @ 75%
Career
- Operators: South African Railways; Alfred County Railway; Welsh Highland Railway
- Class: Class NG G16
- Number in class: 34
- Numbers: NG85-NG88, NG109-NG116, NG125-NG131, NG137-NG143, NG149-NG156
- Delivered: 1937-1968
- First run: 1937

The South African Railways Class NG G16 2-6-2+2-6-2 is a narrow gauge steam locomotive class.

Between 1937 and 1968, the South African Railways placed 34 Class NG G16 Garratt articulated 2-6-2+2-6-2 steam locomotives in service on the Avontuur Railway and on the Natal narrow gauge lines.

== Manufacturers ==
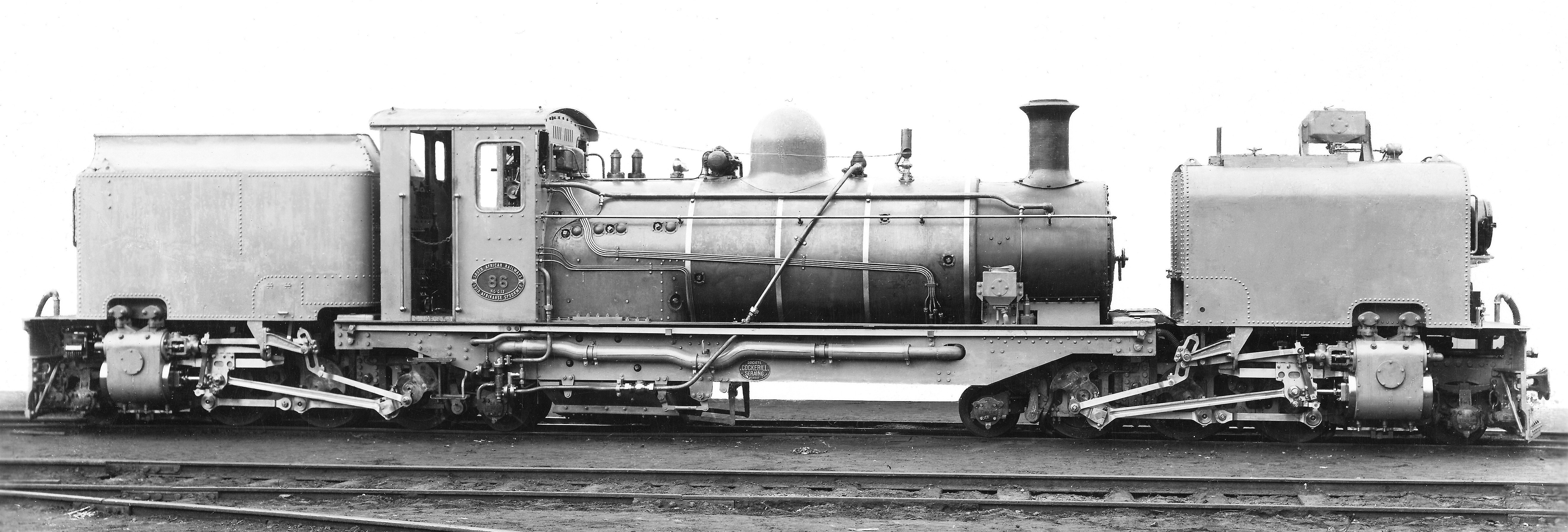
Cockerill-built no. NG86, still inscribed NG/G13, c. 1937

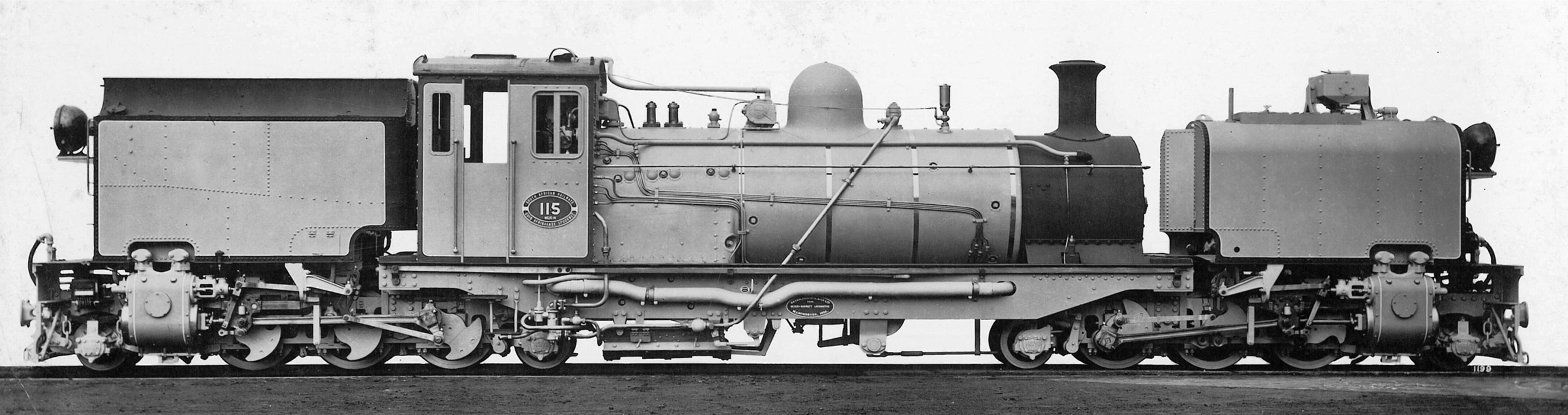
Beyer, Peacock-built no. NG115, c. 1939

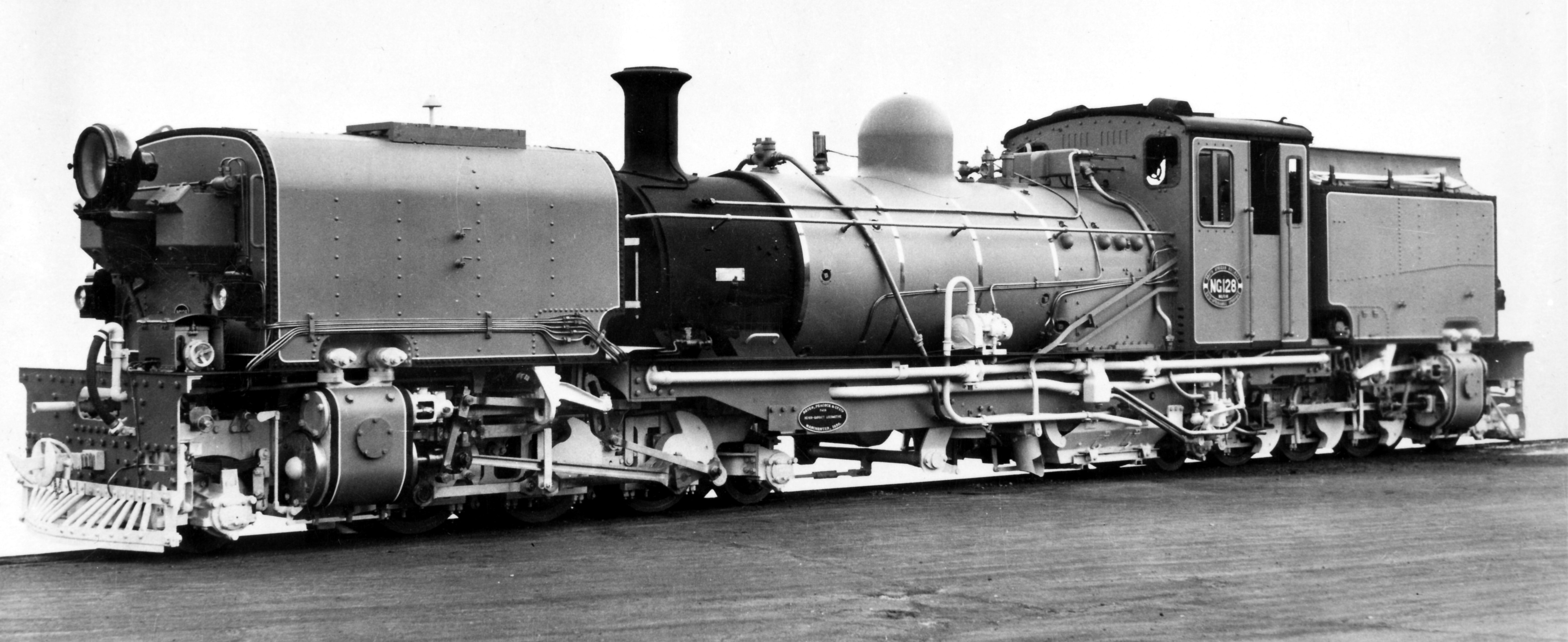
Beyer, Peacock-built no. NG128, c. 1951

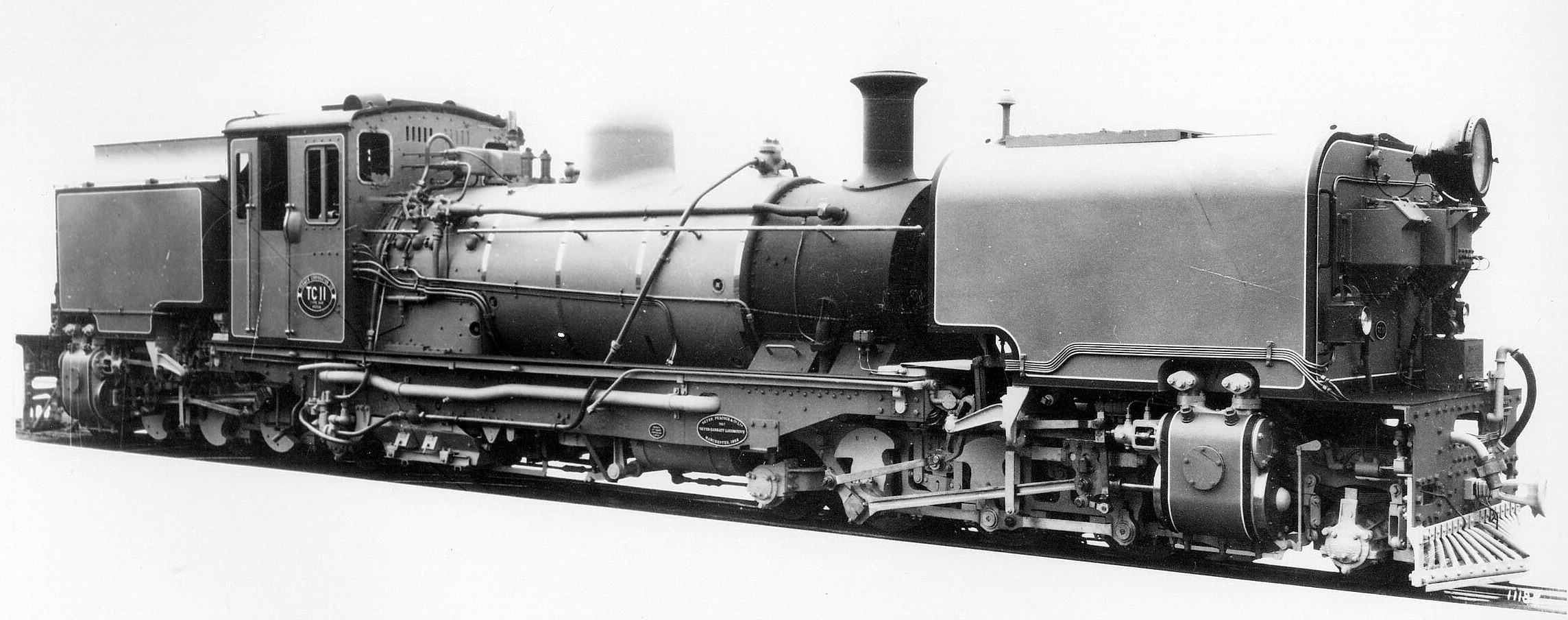
Beyer, Peacock-built no. TC11 for Tsumeb Copper, possibly SAR no. NG142, c 1958

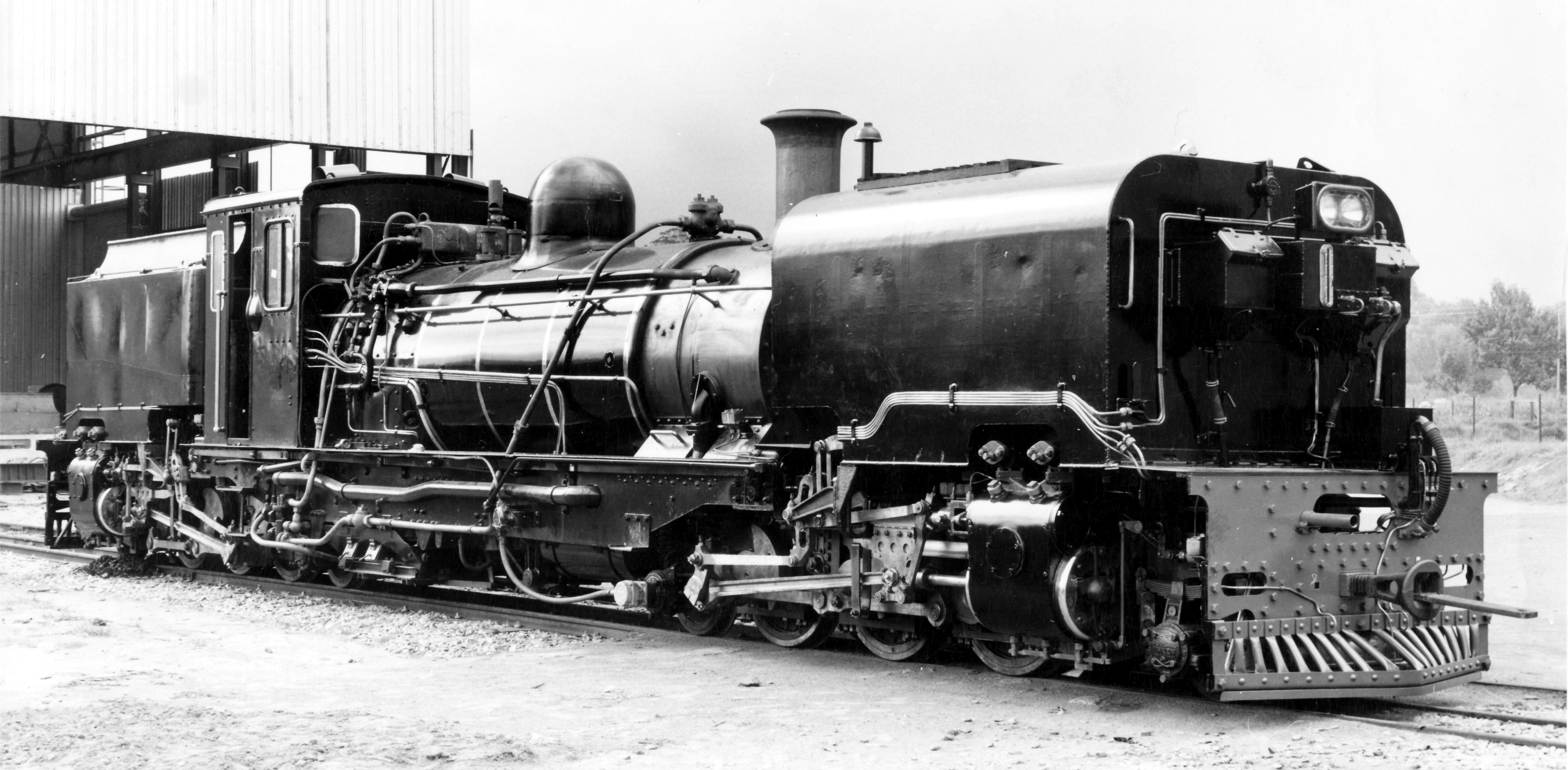
Hunslet-Taylor-built, possibly no. NG149, c. 1967

The success of the Class NG G13 narrow gauge Garratts that were introduced by the South African Railways (SAR) in 1927 led to a decision that any additional narrow gauge articulated locomotives would be of the same design. Altogether 34 more 2-6-2+2-6-2 Double Prairie type narrow gauge locomotives were built, spread over five orders from three manufacturers over a span of 32 years.

=== Cockerill ===
In 1937, Société Anonyme John Cockerill of Seraing in Belgium delivered four new 2-6-2+2-6-2 locomotives, numbered in the range from NG85 to NG88, which were so similar to the older locomotives that they were initially designated Class NG G13 as well. However, since all the carrying wheels were fitted with roller bearing axle boxes and arranged as swiveling pony trucks, compared to the Class NG G13 of which the inner carrying wheels were built to the Gölsdorf system which allowed the axle some lateral movement, it was soon decided to reclassify them to Class NG G16.

These pre-war locomotives, like the earlier Class NG G13 locomotives, were built with riveted coal and water bunkers and with elliptical tops on the water tanks.

=== Beyer, Peacock ===
The second order of eight locomotives was delivered from Beyer, Peacock & Company, England in 1939. They were numbered in the range from NG109 to NG116.

The third order was for a further seven locomotives in 1951, numbered in the range from NG125 to NG131, once again from Beyer, Peacock. They still had elliptical tops on the water tanks and both tank and bunker were riveted as per the pre-war machines, however on the boiler the location of the safety valves, clack valves and main manifold (amongst other details) changed to what would become the standard for all remaining builds.

The fourth batch of seven locomotives, numbered in the range from NG137 to NG143, were the last steam locomotives to be built by Beyer, Peacock and were built to the specifications of the Tsumeb Copper Corporation in South West Africa (SWA). They were mechanically similar to the earlier and subsequent Class NG G16 locomotives, but with a revised coal and water carrying arrangement. These locomotives had an enlarged front water tank capacity, but carried no water in their rear bunkers which consequently had a larger coal capacity. They had flat-topped water tanks with rounded top side edges, and were the first NGG16s to have welded tanks. It was planned to use them as tank-and-tender Garratts, semi-permanently attached to a water tender for use across the Namib desert in SWA, as was the practice with the Cape gauge Classes GM, GMA and GO tank-and-tender Garratts in South Africa.

However, while the locomotives were being built, the decision was made to convert all the SWA narrow gauge lines to Cape gauge. In terms of a prior agreement between the SAR and the Tsumeb Copper Corporation, the SAR would purchase any narrow gauge locomotives that would become redundant should the re-gauging of the SWA system take place. The new locomotives were therefore delivered directly to the SAR in 1958.

On the Avontuur Railway, these locomotives were used as tank-and-tender Garratts, but when the Langkloof members of the class were transferred to Natal in 1964, the water tenders were dispensed with since watering points were much closer together in Natal as a consequence of the early use of tank engines on those narrow-gauge branches.

=== Hunslet-Taylor ===
The final order for eight locomotives in 1967, numbered in the range from NG149 to NG156, turned out to be the last new steam locomotives to be ordered by the SAR. Beyer-Peacock had stopped building steam locomotives after the last batch of Class NG G16 in 1958 and by 1968 they were in the process of closing the business altogether. Since no other overseas manufacturers were available to supply them, they were built by Hunslet-Taylor in Germiston using boilers supplied by their overseas principals, the Hunslet Engine Company in England. Built in 1967 and 1968, these locomotives had the same enlarged capacity front water tanks as those of the Tsumeb group, but their rear bunkers were identical to those of the 1951 batch of locomotives and carried both coal and water.

== Cabside number plates ==
After the Official Languages of the Union Act No 8 of 1925 was passed on 8 May 1925, bilingual English and Afrikaans cabside number plates began to appear on SAR locomotives, initially inscribed "SOUTH AFRICAN RAILWAYS" at the top and "SUID AFRIKANSE SPOORWEË" at the bottom. The Afrikaans spelling conventions were changed from time to time in the early years. On postage stamps, for example, it was "Zuid Afrika" from 1913, "Suidafrika" from the airmail stamps of 1925 and hyphenated "Suid-Afrika" from 1933. On cabside number plates, the spelling of the Afrikaans inscription was later altered with "AFRIKANSE" changed to "AFRIKAANSE" and with "SUID AFRIKAANSE SPOORWEË" unhyphenated, and stil later to "SUID-AFRIKAANSE SPOORWEË" hyphenated.

The Cockerill-built locomotives were delivered with bilingual cabside number plates inscribed "NG/G13" and with the older style Afrikaans "SUID AFRIKANSE SPOORWEË" at the bottom. When they were designated Class NG G16, the "NG/G13" was altered to "NG/G16" by milling out the 3 and riveting on a 6, as shown.

== Service ==
The Cockerill locomotives, numbers NG85 to NG88, remained in Natal for most of their service lives.

The Beyer, Peacock locomotives ordered by the SAR, numbers NG109 to NG116 and NG125 to NG131, were shared more or less equally between the Natal and Langkloof lines.

The seven Beyer, Peacock locomotives ordered by the Tsumeb Copper Corporation, numbers NG137 to NG143, were initially distributed between the Umzinto, Port Shepstone and Avontuur lines, but in 1964 the three that went to the Langkloof were also transferred to Natal.

The Hunslet-Taylor locomotives, numbers NG149 to NG156, were placed in service on the Harding and Donnybrook branches in Natal in 1968.

When the lower section of the Avontuur line was dieselised upon the arrival of the Class 91-000 diesel-electric locomotives in 1973, all the Class NG G16 locomotives still in service were transferred to various branches in Natal, where they remained until they were withdrawn from service.

== Class NG G16A ==
When the four Natal narrow gauge systems were closed down by the SAR, the Weenen and Mid-Illovo lines were lifted, but the Harding line was privatised as the Alfred County Railway (ACR), operating out of Port Shepstone.

As part of their strategy to keep the railway competitive, two of the ACR's Class NG G16 locomotives were rebuilt using technology similar to that used in the Cape gauge Class 26 Red Devil. The rebuilding incorporated a gas producing combustion system (GPCS), Lempor exhausts, an improved spark arrester, lightweight multi-ring articulated piston valves, improved valve events and improved mechanical lubrication. The two locomotives which received this treatment, no. NG141 in 1989 and no. NG155 in 1990, were reclassified to Class NG G16A.

In comparative testing, no. NG141 achieved a fuel saving of 25% compared to a standard Class NG G16 Garratt, a performance which was easily maintained in regular service. The cost of the work paid off financially within twelve months and led to a proposal to develop a Class NG G17, but that never materialised since the line's farming produce and logging traffic was gradually lost to road transport on the improving road network.

In preservation these two locomotives, 141 and 155 both found their way to the Sandstone Estate both albeit in poor condition. 141 in particular was basically scrap from sitting in the salt air at Port Shepstone for over a decade. 155 which was stored at Paddock fared better but had lost its 16A power units some years earlier. In 2017 Sandstone decided to overhaul 155 as a 16A and the power units off 141 were donated to the project. 155 today is complete as a 16A and operates occasionally on the farm. 141 however as a 16A has been lost. It has been partially reassembled using the standard power units off 142 and the standard boiler unit off 128. When complete it will be displayed on the farm as "141" but will be a standard NG/G16.

== Preservation ==
Since withdrawal from SAR service, some locomotives were sold to foreign railways and into private hands and restored to operational condition, while others ended up in various degrees of preservation ranging across the spectrum from running order to staging to total abandonment. In 2017, at least four establishments still operated or were restoring ex-SAR Class NG G16 Garratts. Several however, have now been cut up for scrap (see table below).

=== Welsh Highland Railway ===
The Welsh Highland Railway in Wales has five Class NG G16 locomotives. One, no. NG140, is used as a source of spare parts while four locomotives, Cockerill-built no. NG87 and Beyer, Peacock-built numbers NG130, NG138 and NG143, are used for operational purposes.

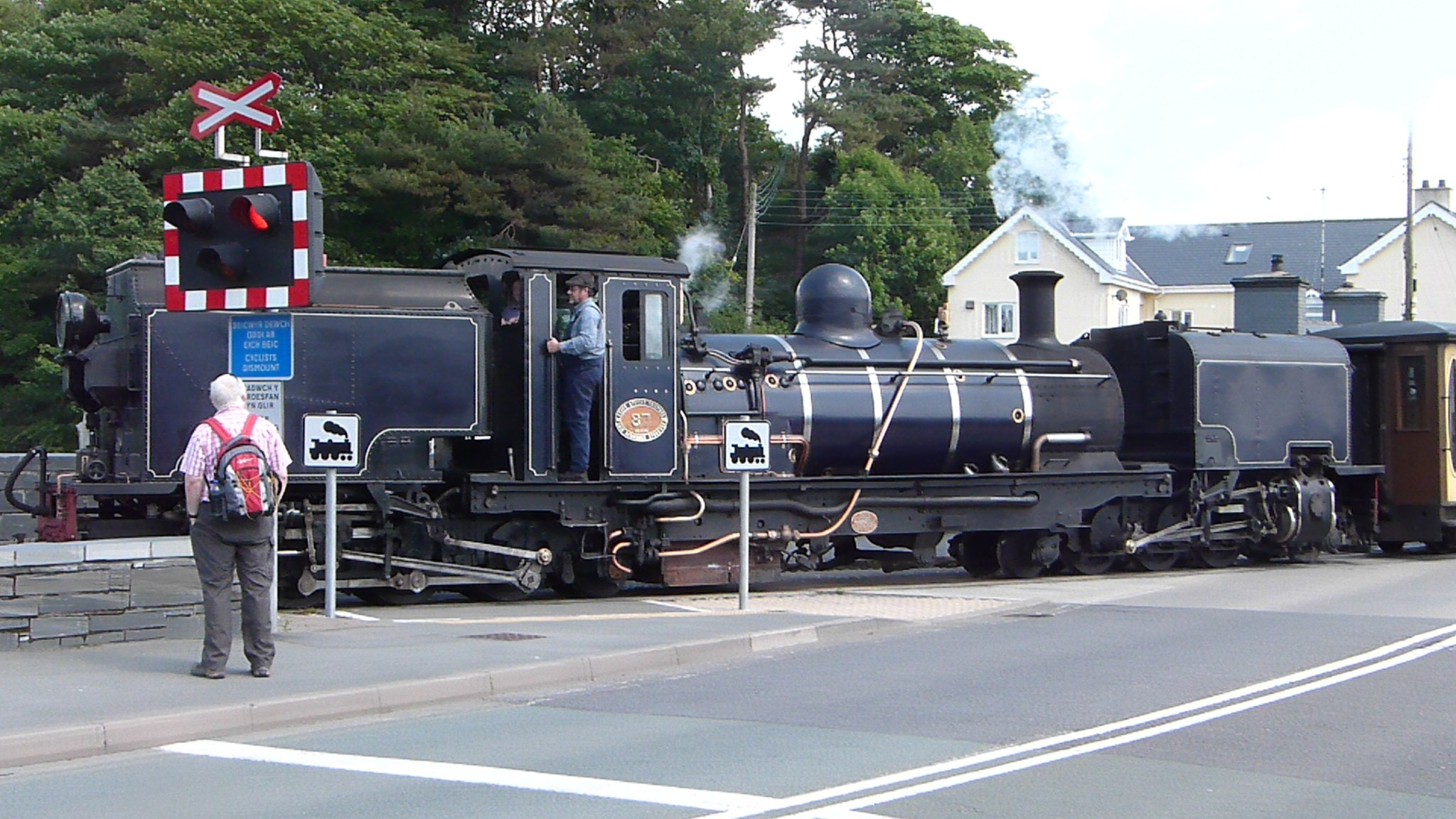
NG87 crossing Britannia bridge in Porthmadog, Wales

=== Sandstone Estates ===
The Sandstone Estates near Ficksburg in the Free State is home to a large number of Class NG G16 locomotives, either as the owners or as the custodian for locomotives belonging to individuals or other establishments. Three of their Class NG G16 locomotives are homed here in operating condition, and are irregularly used during the Estate's annual events like the Cosmos Festival and Cherry Festival. These are Beyer Peacock-built no. NG113 and Hunslet-Taylor-built no. NG153 and 155.

=== Puffing Billy Railway ===
The Puffing Billy Railway, located in the Dandenong Ranges east of Melbourne, Australia, purchased NG129 in August 1996 from ACR shareholder Peter Newton. From 2008 they have completely rebuilt it, including re-gauging it to 2 ft 6 in (762 mm) as additional capacity at a time of increasing passenger loadings. Completion of no. NG129's restoration was planned to coincide with the next time that no. G42 was to be withdrawn for major maintenance. The Puffing Billy Railway also purchased no. NG127 from Peter Newton in November 2011. This gave them a second almost-complete Class NG G16 which will possibly also be totally rebuilt in the future. After first being steamed in September 2019 129, in November 2019 it underwent light engine and load testing.

=== Distribution ===
The last known fate of all the Class NG G16 locomotives, as of February 2026, are shown in Table I.

No.	Builder	Country	Location	Notes
NG85	Cockerill	South Africa	Sandstone Estates	Unrestored, scrap condition.
NG86	Cockerill	South Africa	Sandstone Estates	Unrestored, scrap condition.
NG87	Cockerill	Wales	Welsh Highland Railway	Received a new 10 year boiler ticket, some mechanical work and a full repaint into SAR / SAS colours during the year 2019. Back in operation as of February 2020.
NG88	Cockerill	South Africa	Sandstone Estates	Stored waiting boiler work.
NG109	Beyer, Peacock & Company	England	Peak Rail	Purchased by Waterman Heritage Railway Trust in scrap condition during 2009 from the Exmoor Steam Railway for future use on the Welsh Highland Railway. After failure to gain UK Government backing for his apprenticeship restoration programme, the overhaul was stopped. All parts were moved to Dinas where they remained in open storage until August 2018. After failure to reach a sale agreement with the FR/WHR, the locomotive, still in scrap component form was moved to Peak Rail in Derbyshire, England.
NG110	Beyer, Peacock & Company	South Africa	Sandstone Estates	Unrestored, scrap condition.
NG111	Beyer, Peacock & Company	South Africa	Gold Reef City, Johannesburg	On display in excellent cosmetic condition.
NG112	Beyer, Peacock & Company	South Africa	Century City, Cape Town	On display in good cosmetic condition, on loan from Sandstone Estates.
NG113	Beyer, Peacock & Company	South Africa	Sandstone Estates	Back in operation by April 2019 after a boiler retube.
NG114	Beyer, Peacock & Company	South Africa	Paddock, KwaZulu-Natal	Scrapped at Paddock, South Africa October 2017
NG115	Beyer, Peacock & Company	England	Exmoor Steam Railway	Stored in unrestored, scrap condition.
NG116	Beyer, Peacock & Company	South Africa	Paton's Country Railway, Ixopo, KwaZulu-Natal	Steamed once in April 2017 but as of January 2024 has not made any further progress to regular operation.
NG125	Beyer, Peacock & Company	South Africa	Paddock, KwaZulu-Natal	Scrapped at Paddock, South Africa October 2017
NG126	Beyer, Peacock & Company	South Africa	Paddock, KwaZulu-Natal	Scrapped at Paddock, South Africa September 2017
NG127	Beyer, Peacock & Company	Australia	Puffing Billy Railway	Sold to and overhauled for the Exmoor Steam Railway, England around 1996 by the ACR on behalf of Peter Newton but not delivered. Returned to service on the ACR until April 2006. Stored at Port Shepstone 2006 to 2011, then sold to the Puffing Billy Railway, Melbourne, Australia arriving in March 2012. Currently on display as delivered in unrestored condition in the Museum at Menzies Creek station.
NG128	Beyer, Peacock & Company	South Africa	Sandstone Estates	Unrestored, scrap condition, now being used for spare parts. Boiler used in the rebuild for display of 141
NG129	Beyer, Peacock & Company	Australia	Puffing Billy Railway	Sold to the Puffing Billy Railway by ACR shareholder Peter Newton in 1996. Total rebuild carried out including a new all-welded steel boiler and conversion to 2'6" gauge. Commenced service on the Puffing Billy Railway in December 2019 before being withdrawn again for further work. Operational again from October 2021.
NG130	Beyer, Peacock & Company	Wales	Welsh Highland Railway	Purchased from the Exmoor Steam Railway by Steam Powered Services (Peter Best) in scrap condition. Rebuilt at the Dinas works of the Welsh Highland Railway complete with a new boiler. Entered service from early 2021. Ownership now with the FR&WHR railway company.
NG131	Beyer, Peacock & Company	South Africa	Apple Express, Port Elizabeth	Owned by Transnet Heritage Trust. Lease lend to the Apple Express Organization. Located in the former Humewood Road (Port Elizabeth) Narrow Gauge diesel depot in good external condition. Overhaul to operating condition stopped due to several factors.
NG137	Beyer, Peacock & Company	South Africa	Sandstone Estates	Unrestored, scrap condition.
NG138	Beyer, Peacock & Company	Wales	Welsh Highland Railway	Out of service waiting for a general overhaul and replacement boiler (September 2022)
NG139	Beyer, Peacock & Company	South Africa	Paddock, KwaZulu-Natal	Scrapped at Paddock, South Africa July 2023
NG140	Beyer, Peacock & Company	Wales	Welsh Highland Railway	Disassembled 2005 components (power units and boiler used on other locomotives in the WHR fleet. Tanks and cab scrapped. Boiler cradle stored).
NG141	Beyer, Peacock & Company	South Africa	Sandstone Estates	Rebuilt in 1989 to Class NGG16A, Privately owned by the Mortimer family, in very poor (scrap) condition. In February 2020 it was announced that 141 would give up its 16A power units to make 155 whole with 141 being slowly - cosmetically restored using available standard NG16 parts including the power units off 142 and the boiler unit off 128. It has therefore reverted to Standard NG/G16 configuration.
NG142	Beyer, Peacock & Company	South Africa	Paddock, KwaZulu-Natal	Scrapped at Paddock, South Africa September 2017 with the 16A power units off 155. Power units are now under 141.
NG143	Beyer, Peacock & Company	Wales	Welsh Highland Railway	Re-entered service in October 2022 after overhaul and the fitting of a Hunslet built boiler shipped from Australia ex 129. The last Garratt built by Beyer, Peacock & Company.
NG149	Hunslet-Taylor	South Africa	Paddock, KwaZulu-Natal	Scrapped at Paddock, South Africa August 2017. Engine power units sent with 156 to Ixopo. Power units off 156 the last built scrapped with this locomotive.
NG150	Hunslet-Taylor	South Africa	Sandstone Estates	Unrestored, scrap condition.
NG151	Hunslet-Taylor	South Africa	Paddock, KwaZulu-Natal	Scrapped at Paddock, South Africa July 2023
NG152	Hunslet-Taylor	South Africa	Sandstone Estates	Unrestored, scrap condition.
NG153	Hunslet-Taylor	South Africa	Sandstone Estates	Operational.
NG154	Hunslet-Taylor	South Africa	Humewood Station, Port Elizabeth	Scrapped by the THF at Humewood Road, Port Elizabeth, South Africa August 2011.
NG155	Hunslet-Taylor	South Africa	Sandstone Estates	Sold to Sandstone in 2002. Locomotive has the NGG16A boiler unit but carried the standard British-built unmodified power units off 142. The South African built 16A power units were cut up at Paddock in October 2017. On 31 January 2020, the Sandstone Estate announced that it would overhaul the remains of 155 to operating condition and later announced that the NG/G16A power units off 141 would be fitted after an agreement with the 141 owners, the Mortimer family. Operational from November 2021.
NG156	Hunslet-Taylor	South Africa	Paton's Country Railway, Ixopo, KwaZulu-Natal	Scrap condition. The last steam locomotive built for the South African Railways. Moved from Paddock to Ixopo by December 2015 with the power units off 149. 156 power units were cut up at Paddock in October 2017. Some parts including the British-built Hunslet boiler used to make 116 operational after overhaul. Remaining large components re-assembled using 116 boiler for static display at Ixopo by January 2019. Only the boiler cradle and cab are today genuine 156.

== Works numbers ==
Their engine numbers, builders, years built and works numbers are listed in Table II.

Loco no.	Builder	Year built	Works no.
NG85	Cockerill	1937	3265
NG86	Cockerill	1937	3266
NG87	Cockerill	1937	3267
NG88	Cockerill	1937	3268
NG109	Beyer, Peacock	1939	6919
NG110	Beyer, Peacock	1939	6920
NG111	Beyer, Peacock	1939	6921
NG112	Beyer, Peacock	1939	6922
NG113	Beyer, Peacock	1939	6923
NG114	Beyer, Peacock	1939	6924
NG115	Beyer, Peacock	1939	6925
NG116	Beyer, Peacock	1939	6926
NG125	Beyer, Peacock	1951	7426
NG126	Beyer, Peacock	1951	7427
NG127	Beyer, Peacock	1951	7428
NG128	Beyer, Peacock	1951	7429
NG129	Beyer, Peacock	1951	7430
NG130	Beyer, Peacock	1951	7431
NG131	Beyer, Peacock	1951	7432
NG137	Beyer, Peacock	1958	7862
NG138	Beyer, Peacock	1958	7863
NG139	Beyer, Peacock	1958	7864
NG140	Beyer, Peacock	1958	7865
NG141	Beyer, Peacock	1958	7866
NG142	Beyer, Peacock	1958	7867
NG143	Beyer, Peacock	1958	7868
NG149	Hunslet-Taylor	1967-68	3894
NG150	Hunslet-Taylor	1967-68	3895
NG151	Hunslet-Taylor	1967-68	3896
NG152	Hunslet-Taylor	1967-68	3897
NG153	Hunslet-Taylor	1967-68	3898
NG154	Hunslet-Taylor	1967-68	3899
NG155	Hunslet-Taylor	1967-68	3900
NG156	Hunslet-Taylor	1967-68	3901
