= South African Class 91-000 =

South African diesel locomotive class

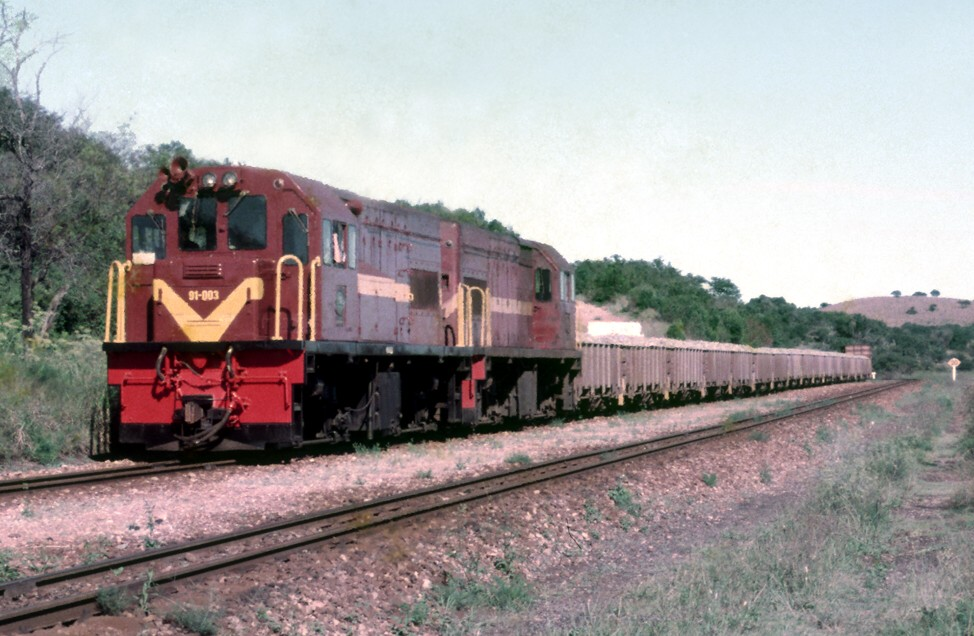
- 91-003 and 91-009 on a limestone train in April 1985
Type and origin
- Power type: Diesel–electric
- Designer: General Electric
- Builder: General Electric
- Serial number: 38603-38622
- Model: GE UM6B
- Build date: 1973
- Total produced: 20
Specifications
- Configuration
  - AAR: B-B
  - Commonwealth: Bo-Bo
- Gauge: 2 ft (610 mm); 3 ft 6 in (1,067 mm) (Bigfoot bogie)
- Wheel diameter: 838 mm (33 in) (2 ft gauge); 915 mm (36 in) (Bigfoot bogie)
- Wheelbase: 7,290 mm (23 ft 11 in); 7,314 mm (24 ft 0 in) Bigfoot
  - Bogie: 2,108 mm (6 ft 11 in); 2,082 mm (6 ft 10 in) Bigfoot
- Pivot centres: 5,232 mm (17 ft 2 in)
- Length
  - Over couplers: 10,580 mm (34 ft 8 1/2 in)
- Width: 2,564 mm (8 ft 5 in)
- Height: 3,632 mm (11 ft 11 in)
- Axle load: 12,000 kg (26,000 lb)
- Adhesive weight: 48,000 kg (106,000 lb)
- Loco weight: 48,000 kg (106,000 lb)
- Fuel type: Diesel
- Fuel capacity: 1,600 litres (350 imp gal)
- Prime mover: Caterpillar D-379
- RPM range: 650-1,365
  - RPM idle: 650
  - Maximum RPM: 1,365
- Engine type: 4-stroke diesel
- Aspiration: Schwitzer 4ME 455 turbocharger
- Generator: 6 pole GE 5GT-601C1
- Traction motors: Four GE 5GE-778AI DC 4 pole Two GE 5GE-761-A13 DC 4 pole Bigfoot
  - Rating 1 hour: 410A, 665A Bigfoot
  - Continuous: 395A @ 14 km/h (8.7 mph); 655A @ 15 km/h (9.3 mph) Bigfoot
- Cylinders: V8
- Gear ratio: 13:68:1 double reduction
- MU working: 3 maximum
- Loco brake: 28-LV-1 with vigilance control
- Train brakes: Westinghouse 4CD2UC compressor/exhauster
- Air tank cap.: 500 litres (110 imp gal)
- Compressor: 0.036 m^{3}/s (1.3 cu ft/s)
- Exhauster: 0.072 m^{3}/s (2.5 cu ft/s)
- Couplers: Willison; AAR knuckle (Bigfoot)
Performance figures
- Maximum speed: 50 km/h (31 mph)
- Power output
  - Starting: 520 kW (700 hp)
  - Continuous: 480 kW (640 hp)
- Tractive effort
  - Starting: 108 kN (24,000 lbf) @ 25% adh.
  - Continuous: 86 kN (19,000 lbf) @ 15 km/h (9.3 mph)
- Factor of adh.
  - Starting: 25%
  - Continuous: 20%
- Brakeforce: 60% ratio @ 345 kPa (50.0 psi)
- Dynamic brake peak effort: 85 kN (19,000 lbf) @ 14 km/h (8.7 mph)
Career
- Operators: South African Railways; Spoornet; Transnet Freight Rail; RRL Grindrod
- Class: Class 91-000
- Number in class: 20
- Numbers: 91-001 to 91-020
- Delivered: 1973
- First run: 1973

The South African Railways Class 91-000 of 1973 was a narrow-gauge diesel–electric locomotive.

Between September and December 1973, the South African Railways placed twenty Class 91-000 General Electric type UM6B diesel–electric locomotives in service on its narrow-gauge Avontuur Railway between Port Elizabeth in the Eastern Cape and Avontuur in the Western Cape. Some of them later also worked on the Alfred County Railway out of Port Shepstone in KwaZulu-Natal.

== Manufacturer ==
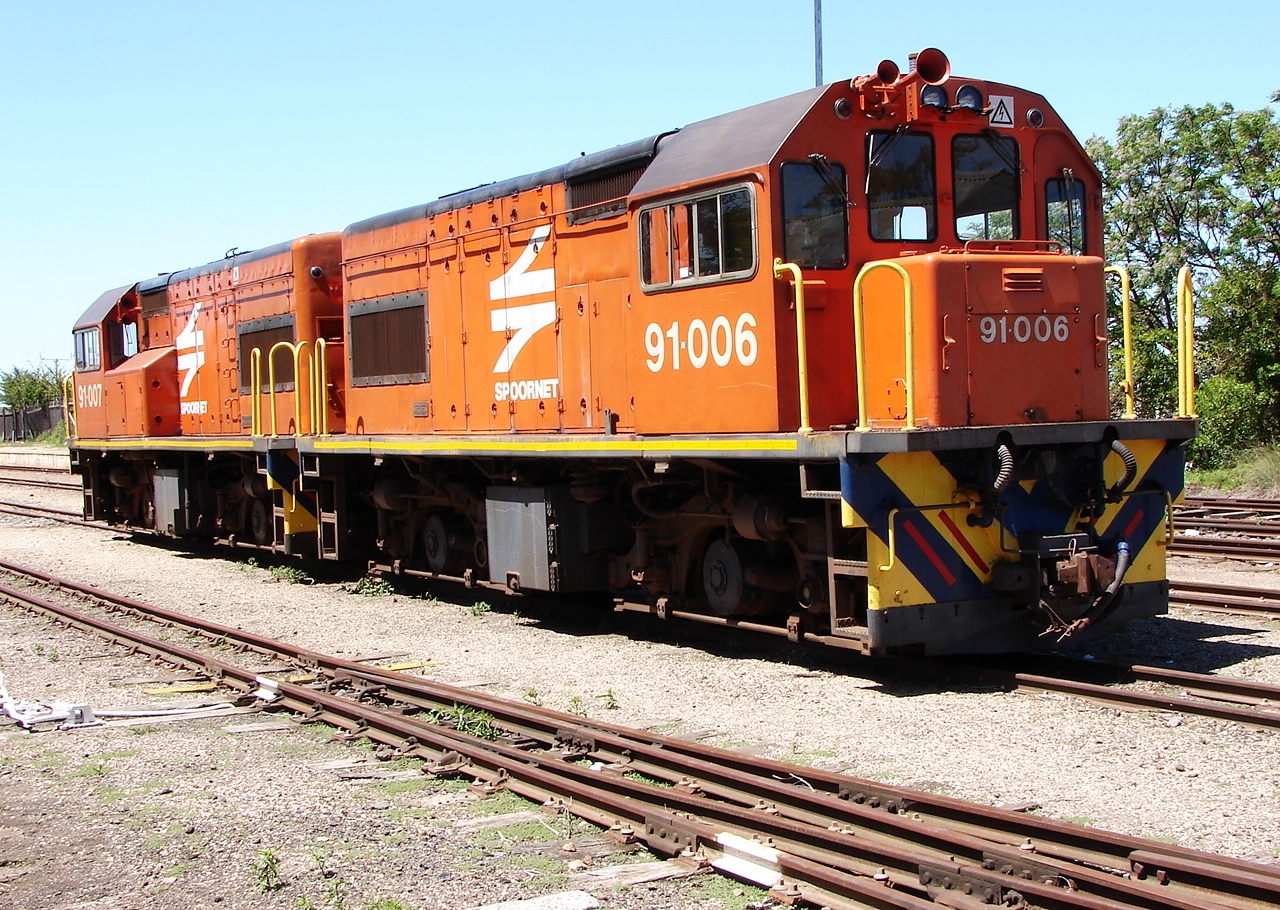
No. 91-006 at Humansdorp station, 18 October 2009

The Class 91-000 GE type UM6B diesel–electric locomotive was designed and built for the South African Railways (SAR) by General Electric (GE) in Erie, Pennsylvania. Twenty were delivered between September and December 1973, numbered 91-001 to 91-020. It was designed for 2 ft (610 mm) narrow gauge and is the largest two-foot-gauge diesel–electric locomotive in the world at a maximum weight of 48,000 kilograms (106,000 pounds).

GE's usual practice was to attach locomotive builder's works plates to the unit's frame below the cab. The Class 91-000 units were delivered with their works plates mounted below their number plates on the cabsides. When they were repainted in the Spoornet orange livery in the 1990s, the SAR number plates were removed and these works plates were relocated to each side of the long hood. With the exception of numbers 91-001 (GE 38604), 91-002 (GE 38603), 91-016 (GE 38619) and 91-017 (GE 38618), the Class 91-000 works numbers are in sequence with their unit numbers. It is very likely that the out-of-sequence works plates were the result of body panels being swapped between locomotives during overhauls.

== Characteristics ==
As a result of the severe clearance problems presented by the two-foot gauge, it was not possible to follow the usual practice of axle-hung traction motors. Special bogies had to be designed with both traction motors mounted between the axles and with one traction motor on each side of each bogie.

The locomotives are air as well as dynamically braked. A lag control was incorporated into the train's brake pipes to prevent bunching of the wagons upon braking and snatching upon restarting. This, combined with the cabling required for multi-unit control, resulted in altogether seven cable connections between consisted units.

The Class 91-000 also introduced the new Willison or SA3 coupler which replaced the old Bell-and-hook type coupler on new Avontuur Railway rolling stock acquired for limestone traffic in the 1970s.

== Service ==
=== South African Railways ===
The Class 91-000 replaced the Class NG G13 and NG G16 Garratts which had been working the Langkloof narrow gauge line until then, but for a number of years it worked alongside the Class NG15 Kalahari steam locomotives. It is the only diesel–electric locomotive type to have operated on South Africa's narrow-gauge lines.

These locomotives served nearly exclusively on the Langkloof line, but between 1992 and December 2003 a few of them also worked on the Alfred County Railway (ACR) narrow-gauge line out of Port Shepstone. Units which were transferred to and from Natal usually travelled all the way from Port Elizabeth under their own power on what became known as Bigfoot bogies, which were actually 3 ft 6 in (1,067 mm) Cape gauge Class 36-000 GE type SG10B bogies. These Bigfoot bogies were also used under the Class 91-000 locomotives whenever they had to be exchanged for maintenance purposes, sometimes running under their own power, sometimes hauled dead.

Over the years since the Class 91-000 was commissioned, the demand for rail services declined steadily on both the ACR and the Langkloof lines. Still, even though road transport had triumphed over rail transport in respect of fruit traffic in the Langkloof by the 1980s, the eastern part of the line remained busy for some years hauling limestone from Loerie. When the quarry that fed Loerie station by cableway was closed, however, the fate of the narrow-gauge line was virtually sealed.

Despite this, in the Avontuur Railway's centenary year in 2003 Spoornet still stated its commitment to keep the line in service by undertaking to invest in infrastructure and technology. As late as September 2005 there was even talk of extending the 107-kilometre-long (66-mile) branch line from Loerie further into the Gamtoos valley to assist farmers who had difficulty moving their produce.

Of the 20 built, 18 were still operational in 2009, two having been withdrawn after accident damage. However, Transnet Freight Rail (TFR) had decided that narrow-gauge railway operations were no longer in its "core line of business" and began putting some of the locomotives up for auction.

One Class 91-000 locomotive, No. 91-010, was still in service with TFR in 2013. It was mounted on Bigfoot bogies of which only one was equipped with traction motors, and equipped with AAR knuckle couplers for use as a shunting engine at the Swartkops electric locomotive depot in Port Elizabeth. This is the locomotive that was purchased by the Sandstone Estate less the bogies. The rest of the fleet which were still on the TFR roster were standing idle, staged at the narrow-gauge depot at Humewood Road in Port Elizabeth. Mass scrapping of these locomotives is expected to take place in January 2019.

=== Industrial service ===
Five locomotives were sold to RRL Grindrod, a joint venture between Solethu Investments, a South African Black Economic Empowerment (BEE) rail logistics company, and Grindrod Limited, a shipping and logistics group, for use at Welkom in the Free State to haul mine hoppers. Four of them were renumbered in the range from RRL 91-01 to 91-04 and their original narrow-gauge bogies were cut in half and widened to 3 ft 6 in (1,067 mm) Cape gauge. The fifth was the accident-damaged no. 91-009 which was completely rebuilt with a 700 hp Caterpillar main engine. It is today (December 2018) the Capitol Park Shunter for Rovos Rail and has been re-numbered 91-011 engine-generator.

Three more units were sold at auction on 11 July 2013. These were purchased by a Port Elizabeth scrap merchant for rebuilding and resale. One (91-011) was sold to Argentina. By April 2017, both 013 and 018 were in storage in restored condition inside a section of the Humewood Road diesel depot, for sale. By 2023 both 013 and 018 had been sold to Madagascar on Meter Gauge bogies.

=== Preservation ===
No. 91-001 is preserved at the Outeniqua Transport Museum in George.

Two units, numbers 91-006 and 91-007, were transferred to Paton's Country Narrow Gauge Railway in 2015 on lease from the THF. They were used on the narrow-gauge tourist trains running from Allwoodburn Siding to Carisbrook Ixopo in KwaZulu-Natal but are now dumped at Allwoodburn siding. (October 2023)

No. 91-010 was sold to Sandstone Estates in basic operating condition and arrived at their facility by road on 31 October 2016. After some maintenance and correction of faults, it performed route-proving runs during the first week of April 2017. It then entered regular service on the Sandstone Railroad during the Sandstone Stars of 2017 event. Its first duty was the recovery of NG/G16 88 which had failed at Vilima. 91-016 and 91-019 were also purchased by the Sandstone Estates in September 2017 and February 2019 respectively with 91-016 being resold to The Darnall Locomotive and Railway Heritage Trust, England in 2022.

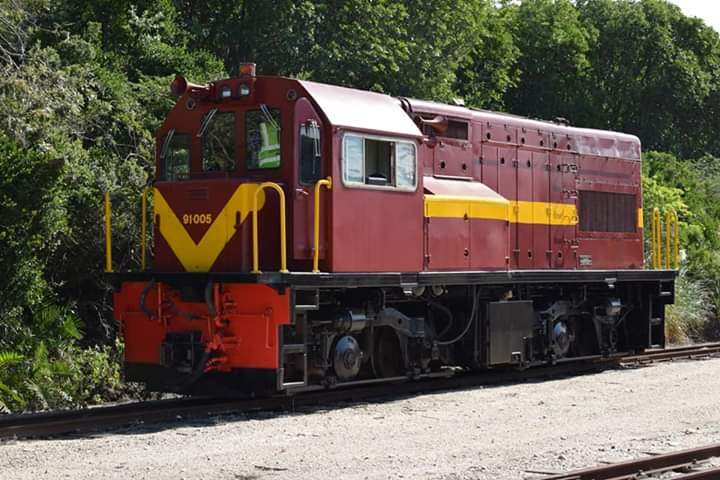
91-005 restored by Apple Express (2/03/2019)

In December 2018, it was confirmed that the Apple Express organization based at Humewood Road had purchased 91-005 and leased 91-020 from the THF. 91-005 was started up for the first time in over twelve years in December 2018. However, with the Apple Express losing their leader to Covid and failing to win a tender to operate, 91-005 reverted to the previous owner and was sold to the DRC (Congo) in August 2023.

== Fleet numbers ==
The Class 91-000 builder's works numbers and their known disposal are listed in the table.

Class 91-000, GE type UM6B
Image	Loco no.	Works no.	Disposal
	91-001	38604	On display at Outeniqua Transport Museum in George.
	91-002	38603	Sold for scrap November 2018.
	91-003	38605	Sold for scrap November 2018.
	91-004	38606	Sold for scrap November 2018.
	91-005	38607	Sold to the DRC (Congo) August 2023 with two-foot bogies in operating condition.
	91-006	38608	Paton's Country Narrow Gauge Railway Ixopo. Dumped.
	91-007	38609	Paton's Country Narrow Gauge Railway Ixopo. Dumped
	91-008	38610	Sold for scrap November 2018.
	91-009	38611	RRL rebuilt as gen-set UL-01 Capitol Park (Rovos Rail) Shunter on 3'6" gauge bogies (Numbered 91-011) Operational.
	91-010	38612	Sandstone Railroad. Operational
	91-011	38613	Sold by Transnet at auction 11 Jul 2013 to Versarail, Overhauled and re-sold in 2017 to BTU Argentina using Meter Gauge Bogies. Operational.
	91-012	38614	Sold for scrap 2017
	91-013	38615	Sold by Transnet at auction 11 Jul 2013 to Versarail. Operational. Re-gauged to Meter and leased to Madagascar, October 2020
	91-014	38616	Scrapped Feb 1997 following wreck.
	91-015	38617	Sold for scrap November 2018.
	91-016	38619	Sold to Sandstone Estates for spare parts in 2017. Resold in 2022, as of March 2024 in the UK with the Darnall Locomotive and Railway Heritage Trust for overhaul. Original 2' gauge bogies currently widened to Cape Gauge - to be regauged back to 2 foot.
	91-017	38618	Sold for scrap 2017
	91-018	38620	Sold by Transnet at auction 11 Jul 2013 to Versarail. Operational. Re-gauged to Meter and leased to Madagascar October 2020
	91-019	38621	Sold for scrap November 2018 then re-sold to Sandstone Estates in February 2019.
	91-020	38622	Humewood Depot. Owned by the THF. Stored.

== Liveries ==
The Class 91-000 were all delivered in the SAR Gulf Red livery with signal red buffer beams, yellow side stripes on the long hood sides and a yellow V on each end. In the 1990s they began to be repainted in the Spoornet orange livery with a yellow and blue chevron pattern on the buffer beams. Only one, 91-001, was repainted in the Spoornet blue livery with outline numbers on the long hood sides in about 2006.
