= South African Class NG10 4-6-2 =

1916 narrow-gauge steam locomotive

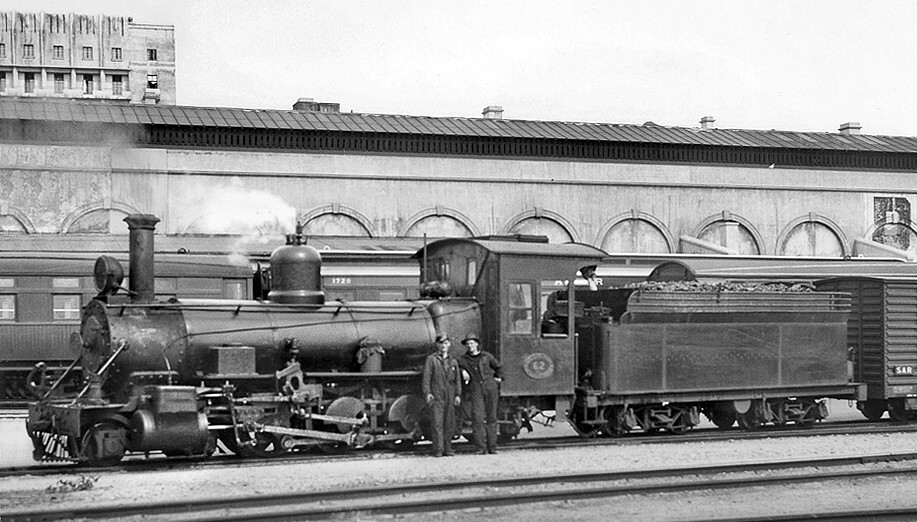
- Class NG10 no. NG62, c. 1930
Type and origin
- Power type: Steam
- Designer: Baldwin Locomotive Works
- Builder: Baldwin Locomotive Works
- Serial number: 42633-42638
- Build date: 1916
- Total produced: 6
Specifications
- Configuration
  - Whyte: 4-6-2
  - UIC: 2'C1'n2
- Driver: 2nd coupled axle
- Gauge: 2 ft (610 mm) narrow
- Leading dia.: 22 in (559 mm)
- Coupled dia.: 36 in (914 mm)
- Trailing dia.: 20 1/2 in (521 mm)
- Tender wheels: 22 in (559 mm)
- Wheelbase: 40 ft 3 3/4 in (12,287 mm)
  - Engine: 19 ft 7 1/2 in (5,982 mm)
  - Leading: 4 ft (1,219 mm)
  - Coupled: 6 ft 6 in (1,981 mm)
  - Tender: 13 ft 9 in (4,191 mm)
  - Tender bogie: 4 ft 3 in (1,295 mm)
- Length
  - Over couplers: 47 ft 1 3/8 in (14,361 mm)
- Height: 10 ft 6 in (3,200 mm)
- Frame type: Bar
- Axle load: 6 LT 15 cwt 3 qtr (6,896 kg)
  - Leading: 5 LT 3 cwt (5,233 kg)
  - 1st coupled: 6 LT 7 cwt 3 qtr (6,490 kg)
  - 2nd coupled: 6 LT 15 cwt 3 qtr (6,896 kg)
  - 3rd coupled: 6 LT 10 cwt 2 qtr (6,630 kg)
  - Trailing: 3 LT 12 cwt (3,658 kg)
  - Tender bogie: 9 LT 7 cwt 2 qtr (9,525 kg)
  - Tender axle: 4 LT 13 cwt 3 qtr (4,763 kg)
- Adhesive weight: 19 LT 14 cwt (20,020 kg)
- Loco weight: 28 LT 9 cwt (28,910 kg)
- Tender weight: 18 LT 15 cwt (19,050 kg)
- Total weight: 47 LT 4 cwt (47,960 kg)
- Tender type: 2-axle bogies
- Fuel type: Coal
- Fuel capacity: 4 LT (4.1 t)
- Water cap.: 1,930 imp gal (8,770 L)
- Firebox
  - Type: Belpaire
  - Grate area: 14.2 sq ft (1.32 m^{2})
- Boiler
  - Pitch: 5 ft (1,524 mm)
  - Diameter: 3 ft 6 in (1,067 mm)
  - Tube plates: 12 ft 4 3/4 in (3,778 mm)
  - Small tubes: 119: 1 7/8 in (48 mm)
- Boiler pressure: 180 psi (1,241 kPa)
- Heating surface
  - Firebox: 56 sq ft (5.2 m^{2})
  - Tubes: 727 sq ft (67.5 m^{2})
  - Total surface: 783 sq ft (72.7 m^{2})
- Cylinders: Two
- Cylinder size: 13 1/2 in (343 mm) bore 18 in (457 mm) stroke
- Valve gear: Walschaerts
- Valve type: Slide
- Couplers: Bell-and-hook
Performance figures
- Tractive effort: 12,302 lbf (54.72 kN) @ 75%
Career
- Operators: South African Railways
- Class: Class NG10
- Number in class: 6
- Numbers: NG61-NG66
- Nicknames: Sixty
- Delivered: 1916
- First run: 1916
- Withdrawn: 1962
- The 2nd coupled axle had flangeless wheels

The South African Railways Class NG10 4-6-2 of 1916 was a narrow-gauge steam locomotive.

In 1916, the South African Railways placed six 4-6-2 steam locomotives in service on the Langkloof narrow-gauge line. When a system of grouping narrow-gauge locomotives into classes was eventually introduced somewhere between 1928 and 1930, they were classified as Class NG10.

== Manufacturer ==
During World War I, the usual British locomotive suppliers were hard pressed to satisfy British and foreign requirements. This led to several new locomotive types for the South African Railways (SAR) being ordered from North American builders.

In 1915, the SAR placed an order with the Baldwin Locomotive Works in the United States for six narrow-gauge 4-6-2 locomotives. They were delivered in 1916 and were numbered in the range from NG61 to NG66.

== Characteristics ==
The locomotives were more powerful than previous types and, with their more commodious cabs, proved popular with the crews. Since a classification system for narrow-gauge locomotives had not yet been adopted by the SAR, they became popularly known as the Sixties, based on their engine number range.

They were typically American in appearance with an ornate chimney cap and steam dome. In addition to the usual cabside number plates, they also sported a third engine number on a disk on the front of the smokebox door. They had outside bar frames, Belpaire fireboxes and Walschaerts valve gear.

== Service ==
The locomotives were erected at the Uitenhage workshops and placed in service on the Avontuur Railway between Port Elizabeth and Avontuur in the Langkloof, where they spent most of their working lives. For much of that time they worked out of Loerie, either assisting up the bank or on the Patensie branch.

The arrival of the Class NG G13 Garratts at Humewood Road in Port Elizabeth in 1928 came soon after the Avontuur Railway’s transition from a lightly-trafficked developmental line to a narrow-gauge heavy hauler, when the new cement works at New Brighton were opened. Being able to take almost double the load of a Class NG10 locomotive, the Garratts were mainly used on the limestone traffic, but were also employed up and down the Langkloof.

At the Limebank Quarry near Loerie, quarried limestone was crushed and loaded into buckets carried on an overhead ropeway from the quarry to bunkers at Loerie. In 1954, the cement company doubled its quarry output capacity when a second parallel ropeway was placed in service. A limitation in the capacity of the limestone trains throughout the steam haulage era was that double heading by Garratt locomotives was not permitted to protect their pivots from excessive stresses. It therefore became common practice to run heavier Garratt-headed trains of up to 14 wagons with a Class NG10 helper cut into the train some eight to ten wagons back. From a passing loop at Summit, the Garratt would continue to Chelsea unassisted whilst the helper would return down the hill to Loerie.

In 1948, numbers NG63 and NG64 were transferred to South West Africa where they performed yard work. The rest remained on the Avontuur line performing similar work around Humewood Road in Port Elizabeth and at Loerie.

== Classification, withdrawal and preservation ==
The system of grouping narrow-gauge locomotives into classes was only adopted by the SAR somewhere between 1928 and 1930. At that point, these locomotives were classified as Class NG10.

All but one were withdrawn from service by July 1962 as a direct result of the regauging of all the narrow-gauge lines in South West Africa to Cape gauge. Some of the older narrow-gauge locomotive stock in South West Africa were withdrawn from service while the rest were all transferred to South Africa. All 21 Class NG15 Kalaharis were allocated to the Langkloof railway. Their arrival increased the number of locomotives on the Avontuur Railway from a total of 23 in March 1961 to 43 by July. As a result, all but one of the Class NG10 as well as Class NG G11 no. 51, South Africa’s first Garratt, were withdrawn from service by July 1962.

For some reason the class leader, Class NG10 no. NG61, remained on the books a few months longer than the rest, until November 1962.

NG61 has been the subject of an extensive rebuild from scrap condition at the Bloemfontein workshops of the Sandstone Estates. It steamed for the first time in 59 years on 12 February 2019.

== Illustration ==
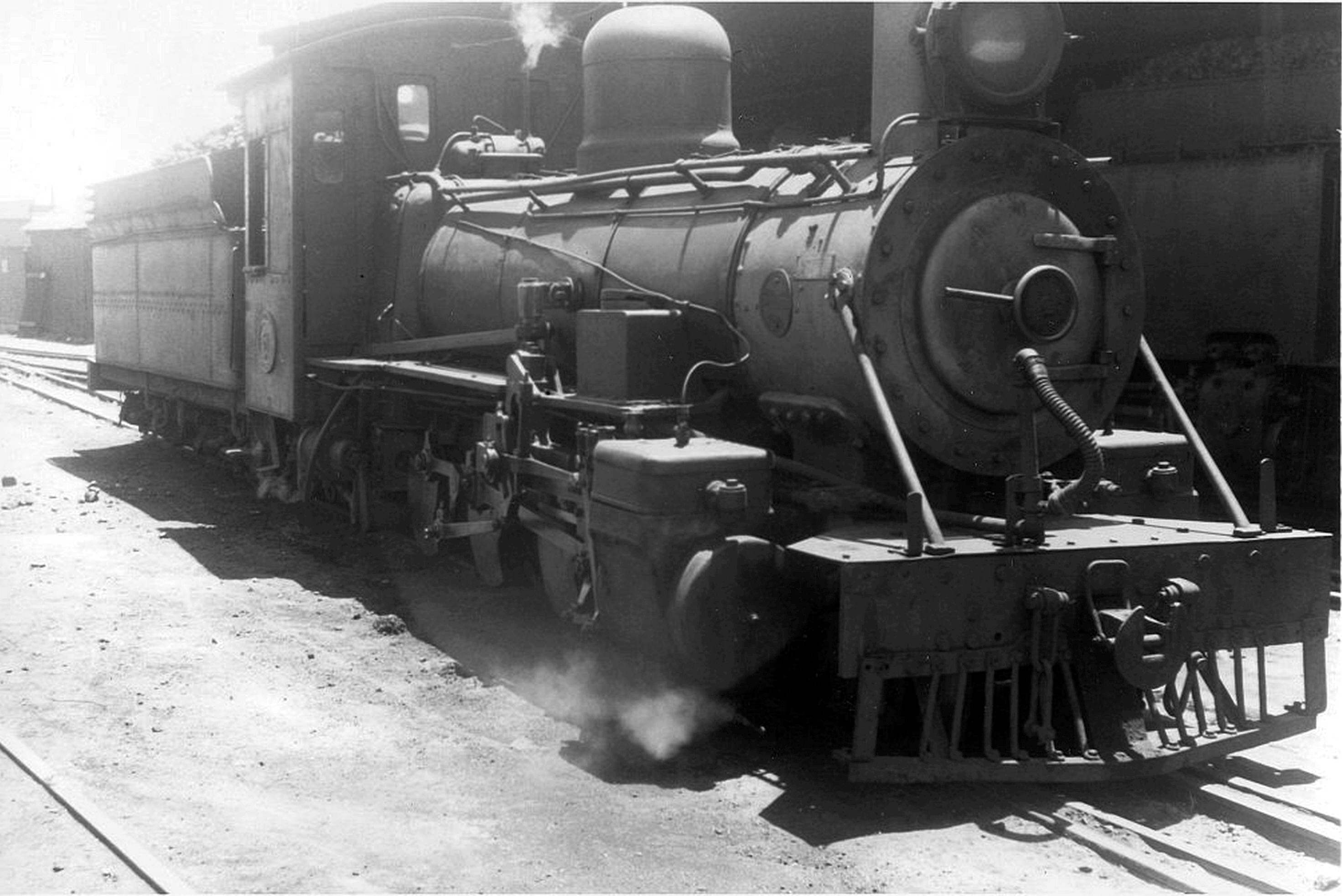
No. NG61 in steam at Humewood Road Locomotive in January 1961
