= South African Class NG G13 2-6-2+2-6-2 =

1927 articulated narrow-gauge steam locomotive

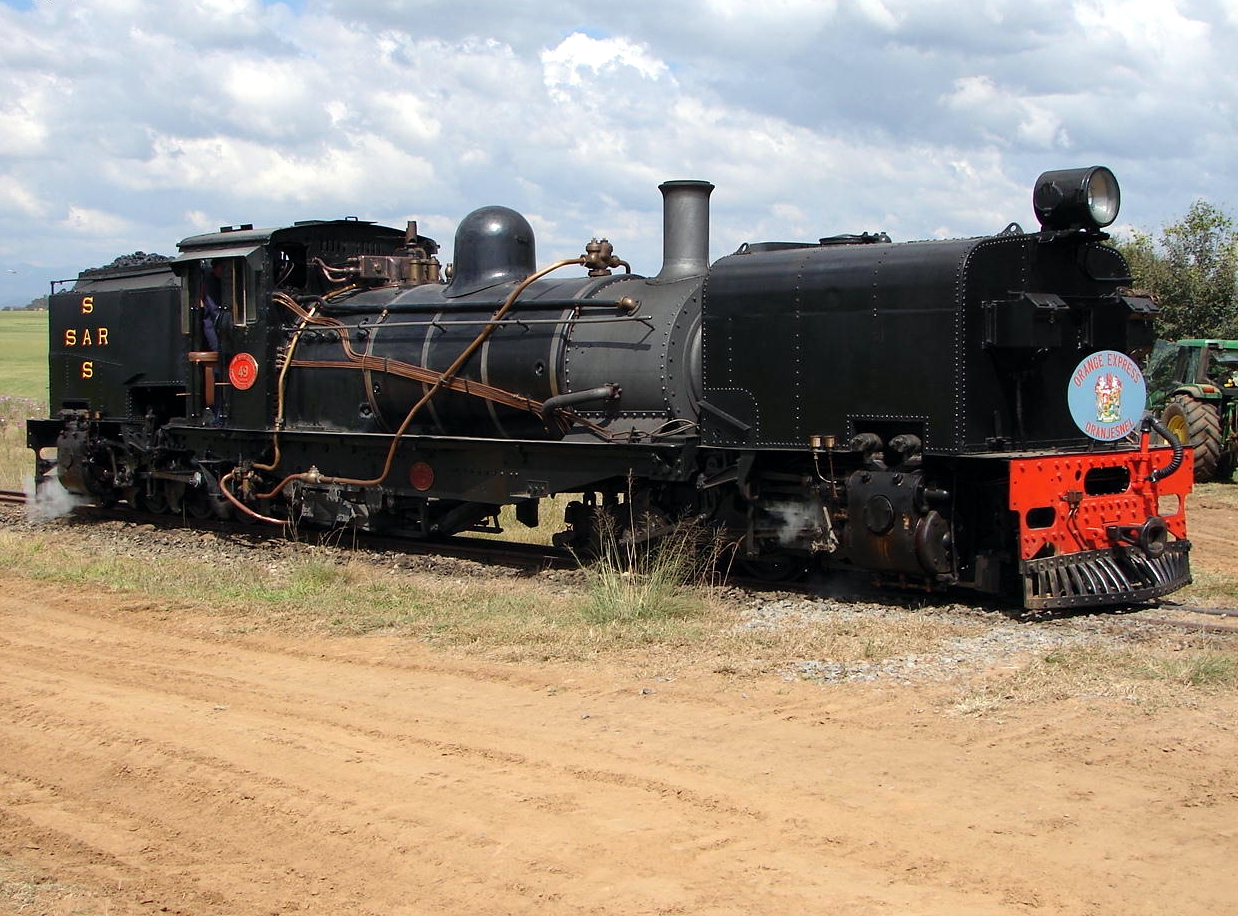
- NG G13 no. 49 at Sandstone Estates, 9 April 2006
Type and origin
- Power type: Steam
- Designer: Hannoversche Maschinenbau
- Builder: Hannoversche Maschinenbau
- Serial number: 10549–10551, 10598–10599, 10629–10635
- Model: Class NG G13
- Build date: 1927–1928
- Total produced: 12
Specifications
- Configuration
  - Whyte: 2-6-2+2-6-2 (Double Prairie)
  - UIC: 1'C1'+1'C1'h4
- Driver: 3rd & 4th coupled axles
- Gauge: 2 ft narrow gauge
- Leading dia.: 21 in (533 mm)
- Coupled dia.: 33 in (838 mm)
- Trailing dia.: 21 in (533 mm)
- Minimum curve: 150 ft (46 m)
- Wheelbase: 42 ft 9 in (13,030 mm)
  - Engine: 13 ft 2 in (4,013 mm) each
  - Coupled: 6 ft 3 in (1,905 mm) each
- Pivot centres: 23 ft 9 in (7,239 mm)
- Length
  - Over couplers: 48 ft 5 1/4 in (14,764 mm)
- Height: 10 ft 4 in (3,150 mm)
- Frame type: Bar
- Axle load: 7 LT 1 cwt 2 qtr (7,189 kg)
  - Leading: 6 LT 10 cwt 1 qtr (6,617 kg) front 6 LT 1 cwt 1 qtr (6,160 kg) rear
  - 1st coupled: 7 LT 1 cwt 2 qtr (7,189 kg)
  - 2nd coupled: 6 LT 18 cwt 1 qtr (7,023 kg)
  - 3rd coupled: 6 LT 14 cwt (6,808 kg)
  - 4th coupled: 6 LT 16 cwt 1 qtr (6,922 kg)
  - 5th coupled: 6 LT 17 cwt 3 qtr (6,998 kg)
  - 6th coupled: 6 LT 13 cwt 2 qtr (6,782 kg)
  - Trailing: 4 LT 0 cwt 2 qtr (4,090 kg) front 4 LT (4,064 kg) rear
- Adhesive weight: 41 LT 1 cwt 1 qtr (41,720 kg)
- Loco weight: 61 LT 13 cwt 1 qtr (62,650 kg)
- Fuel type: Coal
- Fuel capacity: 4 LT (4.1 t)
- Water cap.: 1,285 imp gal (5,840 L) front 540 imp gal (2,450 L) rear
- Firebox
  - Type: Round-top
  - Grate area: 19.5 sq ft (1.81 m^{2})
- Boiler
  - Pitch: 5 ft 5 in (1,651 mm)
  - Diameter: 4 ft 7 3/4 in (1,416 mm)
  - Tube plates: 9 ft 3 5/8 in (2,835 mm)
  - Small tubes: 152: 1 3/4 in (44 mm)
  - Large tubes: 15: 5 1/2 in (140 mm)
- Boiler pressure: 180 psi (1,241 kPa)
- Safety valve: Pop
- Heating surface
  - Firebox: 82.1 sq ft (7.63 m^{2})
  - Tubes: 839 sq ft (77.9 m^{2})
  - Total surface: 921.1 sq ft (85.57 m^{2})
- Superheater
  - Heating area: 149 sq ft (13.8 m^{2})
- Cylinders: 4
- Cylinder size: 12 in (305 mm) bore 16 in (406 mm) stroke
- Valve gear: Heusinger
- Valve type: Piston
- Couplers: Bell-and-hook (Cape); Johnston link-and-pin (Natal)
Performance figures
- Tractive effort: 18,850 lbf (83.8 kN) @ 75%
Career
- Operators: South African Railways
- Class: Class NG G13
- Number in class: 12
- Numbers: 49–50, 58–60, 77–83
- Delivered: 1927–1929
- First run: 1927
- Withdrawn: 1973

The South African Railways Class NG G13 2-6-2+2-6-2 of 1927 are a class of narrow gauge articulated steam locomotives.

Between 1927 and 1929, the South African Railways placed twelve Class NG G13 Garratt articulated steam locomotives with a 2-6-2+2-6-2 Double Prairie type wheel arrangement in service on the Langkloof and Alfred County Railway narrow gauge lines.

== Manufacturer ==
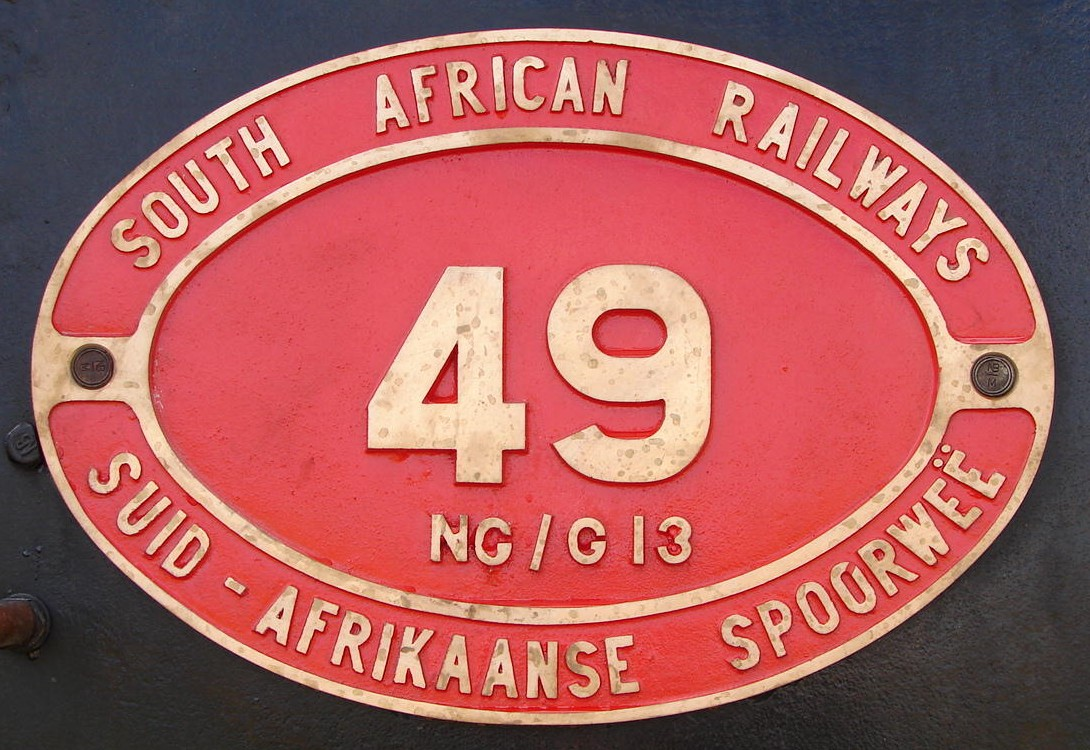
SAR Class NG G13 49 numberplate

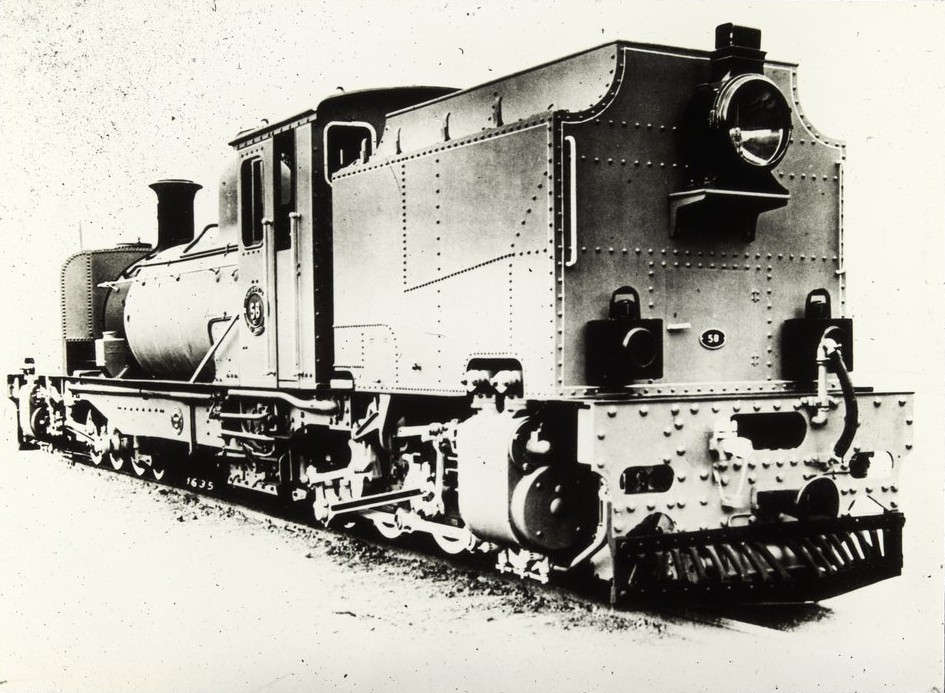
No. NG58, the first Class NG G13 to be delivered, c. 1927

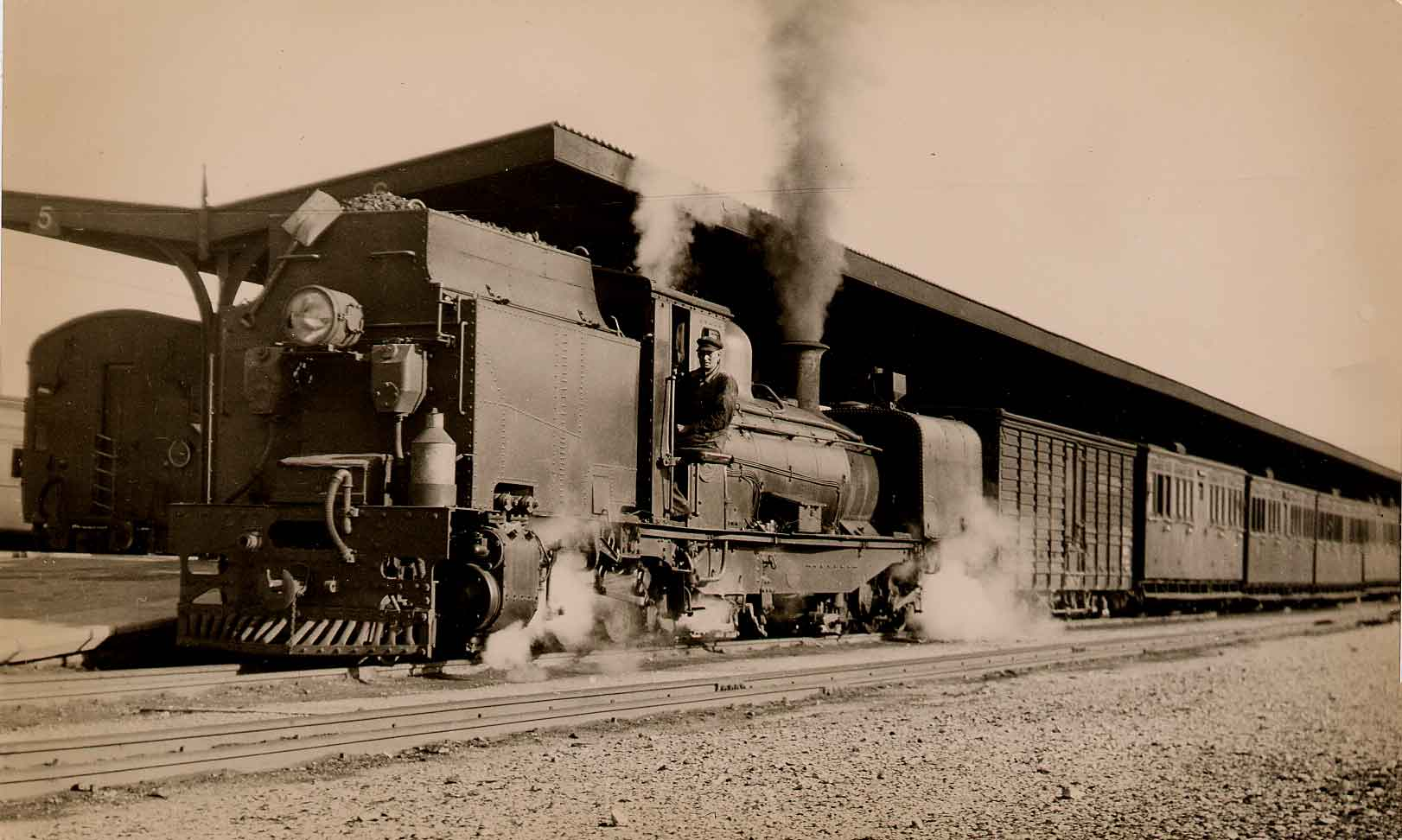
Class NG G13 on a passenger train at Port Elizabeth, c. 1940

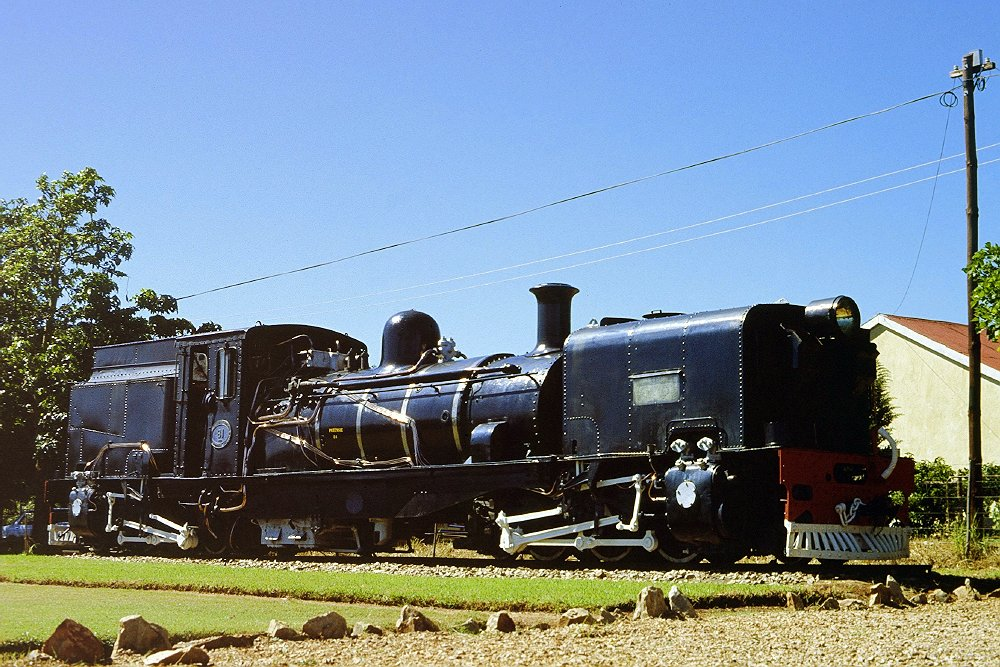
No. NG81 plinthed at Patensie station, April 1985

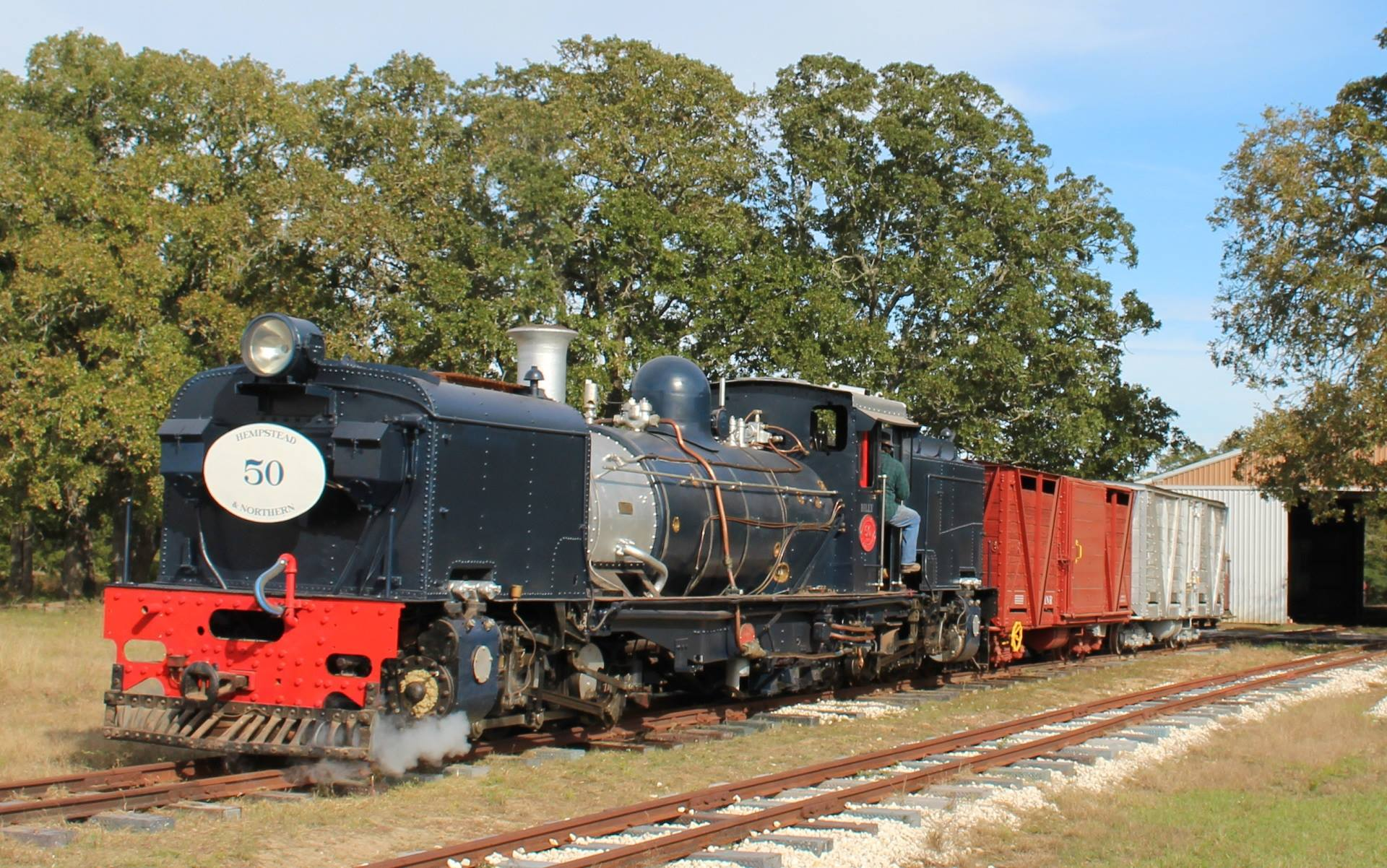
No. NG50 in steam in Hempstead, Texas, November 2015

In 1927, Hannoversche Maschinenbau (Hanomag), in consultation with the South African Railways (SAR), designed a locomotive which was to become the standard 2 feet (610 millimetres) narrow gauge Garratt locomotive in South Africa for the next forty years.

How Garratts, to which Beyer, Peacock & Company held the patent, came to be designed and built by the German firm of Hanomag was the result of the coming into power of the Pact Government in South Africa in 1924. With strong anti-British sentiments amongst Afrikaners in the new government still lingering after the Second Boer War, British manufacturers were avoided whenever possible.

The initial order was for three Class NG G13 locomotives, numbered in the range from NG58 to NG60, which were delivered and placed in service in November 1927. Performance trials of the Class NG G13 proved it to be both powerful and free steaming despite having a smaller grate area than the predecessor Class NG G11. This resulted in an immediate order for another two locomotives, numbers NG49 and NG50, and even before these two were delivered, another seven numbered in the range from NG77 to NG83. The second and third orders were both delivered in 1928 with the third order locomotives entering service during January 1929.

== Characteristics ==
The locomotive was greatly improved from the Class NG G11, with trailing wheels added to each engine unit, outside bar frames instead of plate frames, round-topped fireboxes instead of Belpaire fireboxes, and larger dimensions in most respects except the grate area. They were superheated and sported an extremely compact arrangement of Walschaerts valve gear and outside bar frames. The leading wheels were arranged as conventional pony trucks, while the inner carrying wheels were built to the Gölsdorf system which allowed the axle some lateral movement.

Some rectifiable shortcomings were cylinders with old-fashioned short-travel valves with Z-ported cylinders, plain bearings on the inner carrying wheels that were inclined to run hot and a cab that was too small and unbearably hot in summer. The heat was made worse by the steam turret, vacuum-brake ejector and sight-feed lubricator that were placed inside the cab. Since the seats of the driver and stoker were mounted on poles which allowed them to be swung around to outside the cab, crews could often be seen riding outside to escape the heat.

As built, the sandboxes were mounted on the front of the water tank and rear of the coal bunker, one on either side of each headlight. On some locomotives the front sandboxes were later relocated to the top of the tank.

== Service ==
The introduction of articulated locomotives on the 2 ft (610 mm) narrow gauge branches gave this gauge a new lease of life and made it easier to withstand the agitation from some quarters to convert these branches to Cape gauge. Apart from appreciable economies in working, the Garratts enabled train loads and the carrying capacity of the narrow gauge lines to be virtually doubled without the need to strengthen track and bridges.

=== Natal ===
The first five locomotives, numbers NG49, NG50 and NG58 to NG60, were used almost exclusively on the narrow gauge lines in Natal. Some of these routes had curves of 45 metres (148 feet) radius and gradients of up to 3 in 100 (3%), but the Garratts were well suited to hauling the diverse freight traffic of pulpwood, sugar cane and bananas.

One of these lines, the 122-kilometre-long (76-mile) branch line from Port Shepstone to Paddock via Izotsha, was eventually privatised as the Port Shepstone and Alfred County Railway (ACR) after the SAR ceased operations there in 1986. The ACR conducted both freight and tourist passenger operations, with the tourist train becoming known as the Banana Express.

=== Cape Province ===
The third order of seven locomotives, numbers NG77 to NG83, initially all went to the Avontuur Railway in the Langkloof where most of them remained for their entire service lives. In 1965, numbers NG77 and NG78 were exchanged for two Class NG G11 locomotives, numbers NG54 and NG55, from the Natal system.

The 283-kilometre-long (176-mile) Avontuur line stretches from Port Elizabeth to Avontuur through the Langkloof. The narrow gauge track enabled the trains to pick up fruit virtually directly from the Langkloof fruit farms and ship it directly, without reloading, to the ripening warehouses, distributors and ships at Port Elizabeth. The route became known as the Apple Express after the main crop it transported. The line also carried pulpwood as well as limestone to supply the cement factories which were located on the route.

The arrival of the Class NG G13s at Humewood Road in Port Elizabeth in 1928 came soon after the Avontuur Railway's transition from a lightly trafficked developmental line to a narrow-gauge heavy hauler when the new cement works at New Brighton were opened. Being able to take almost double the load of a Class NG10 locomotive, they were mainly used on the limestone traffic, but were also employed up and down the Langkloof.

At the Limebank Quarry near Loerie, quarried limestone was crushed and loaded into buckets carried on an overhead ropeway from the quarry to bunkers at Loerie. In 1954, the cement company doubled its quarry output capacity when a second parallel ropeway was placed in service. A limitation in the capacity of the limestone trains throughout the steam haulage era was that double heading by Garratt locomotives was not permitted to protect their pivots from excessive stresses. It therefore became common practice to run heavier Garratt-headed trains of up to 14 wagons with a Class NG10 helper cut in to the train some eight to ten wagons back. From a passing loop at Summit, the Garratt would continue to Chelsea unassisted whilst the helper returned down the hill to Loerie.

=== Retirement ===
The Avontuur Garratts ended their service lives working out of Loerie, either hauling limestone trains to Van Stadens or doing duty on the Patensie branch line. When the lower section of the Avontuur Railway was dieselised upon the arrival of the Class 91-000 diesel-electric locomotives in 1973, the Class NG G13 locomotives were all withdrawn from service. Beginning at about the same time, the Natal locomotives were also progressively withdrawn from service.

== Preservation ==
Since withdrawal from SAR service, some locomotives were sold into private hands whilst others ended up in various degrees of preservation ranging across the spectrum from operational to plinthing to total abandonment. No. NG49, is operational at the Sandstone Estates near Ficksburg. Three were plinthed, no. NG80 at Joubertina station, no. NG81 at Patensie station and no. NG83 at Avontuur (until 1988 when it was sold and shipped to Germany then overhauled to operating condition with a new boiler. No. NG50 was shipped to Texas USA and is operational at the Hempstead and Northern Railroad in Hempstead, Texas No. 60 was sold to Switzerland arriving there in July 1986 then fully overhauled to operating condition before being sold on to Wales due to operating constraints.

The last known locations of all the Class NG G13 locomotives are listed in the table.

Number	Works No.	Country	Location	Image	Notes
NG49	10599/1928	South Africa	Sandstone Estates		Operational again by April 2019 after boiler re-tube and some mechanical work.
NG50	10598/1928	United States	Hempstead, Texas		Operational from 15 November 2015 at the Hempstead and Northern Railroad in Hempstead, Texas.
NG58	10549/1927	South Africa	Sandstone Estates		Stored in scrap condition. First NG G13 delivered to SAR.
NG59	10550/1927	South Africa	Scrapped		Wrecked after rolling over in an accident on the Weenen to Escourt line in the early 1980s.
NG60	10551/1927	Wales	Vale of Rheidol Railway		Moved to the Vale of Rheidol Railway in Wales July 2017. Images show full boiler exam taking place by December 2018. Operational from October 2021
NG77	10629/1928	England	Exmoor Steam Railway		In store at Bratton Fleming, previously resided at the Brecon Mountain Railway in Wales. Is 95% complete, boiler overhauled, needs mainly copper pipework to complete. May steam locally in the future. Privately owned by Trevor & June Stirland.
NG78	10630/1928	Germany	Berlin		German Museum of Technology since May 1988, carries works- and number plates for no. NG83.
NG79	10631/1928	South Africa	Scrapped		Scrapped by the THF at Humewood Road, Port Elizabeth August 2011.
NG80	10632/1928	South Africa	Joubertina station		Plinthed in now scrap condition
NG81	10633/1928	South Africa	Patensie station		Plinthed in now scrap condition
NG82	10634/1928	England	Sussex		Previously owned by Peter Rampton and Vale of Rheidol Railway. Sold 2025, privately owned.
NG83	10635/1928	Germany	Emmerich		Stored operational in a bricked up building after a break in. Fully overhauled at Meiningen by 1996 and fitted with a new boiler. Privately owned by Dr. Muhr since May 1988.
