= Alfred County Railway =

Railway in South Africa

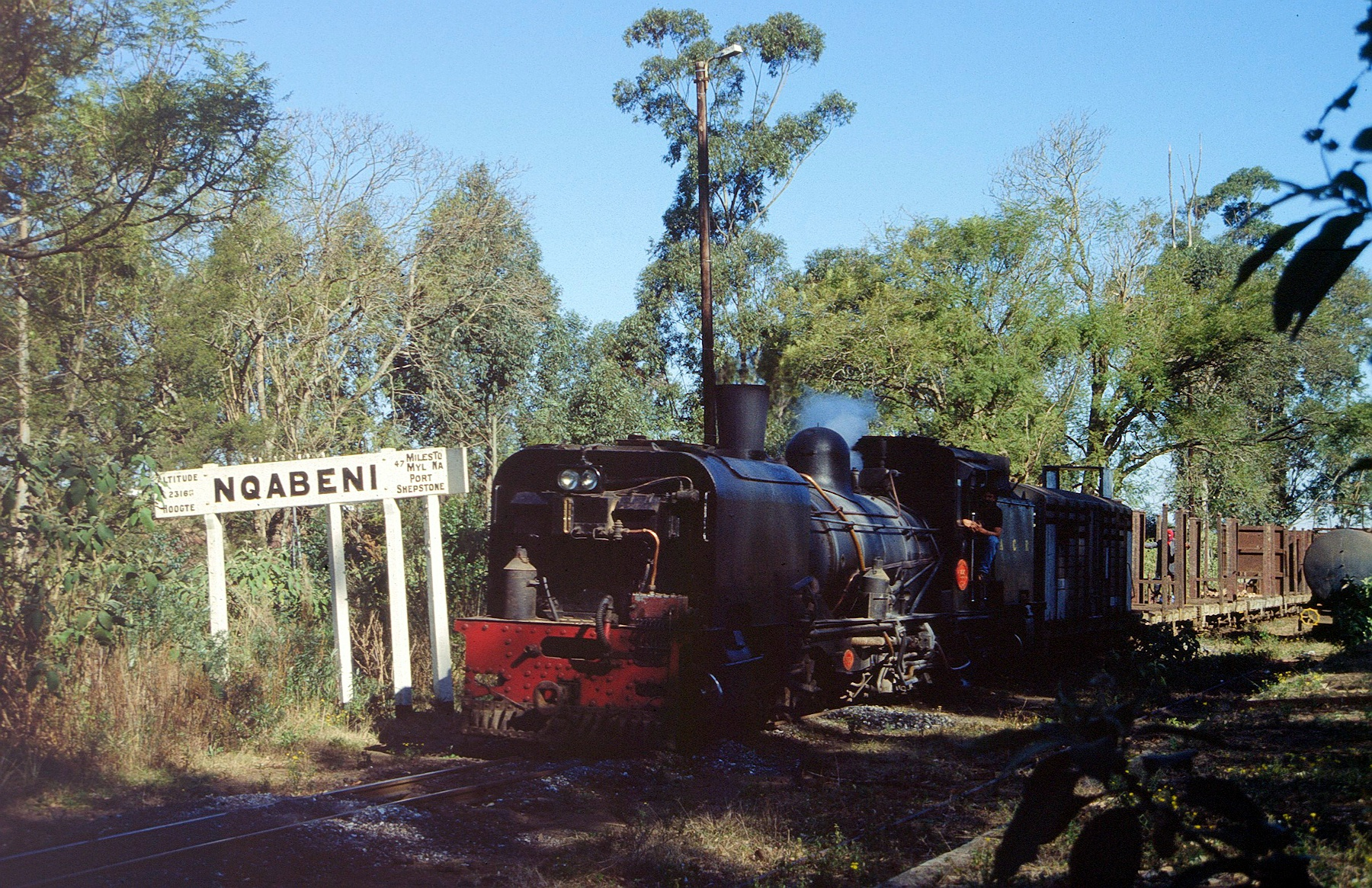
- Alfred County Railway
- Locale: South Africa
- Terminus: Port Shepstone to Harding, KwaZulu-Natal

Commercial operations
- Original gauge: 2 ft (610 mm)

Preserved operations
- Owned by: Transnet
- Length: 122 kilometres (76 mi)
- Preserved gauge: 2 ft (610 mm)

Commercial history
- Opened: 1917
- Closed: 1986

Preservation history
- 3 December 1987: Transnet and PS&ACR sign lease agreement
- April 1988: PS&ACR freight services start
- 15 June 2004: Transnet terminates PS&ACR lease
- 14 December 2004: PCNGR contracted to run Banana Express
- September 2005: Transnet auctions excess stock.
- December 2005: Last running of Banana Express
- 20 April 2006: Transnet terminates PCNGR lease
- 18 June 2008: Storm wrecks bridges along Hibicus Coast

Alfred County Railway is an abandoned 2 ft (610 mm) narrow gauge railway in South Africa, which runs from the southern transport hub of Port Shepstone on the Indian Ocean, via Izotsha and Paddock for 122 kilometres (76 mi) to Harding, KwaZulu-Natal.

== Background ==
South Africa, rich in natural resources and fertile lands, has many areas that are ideal for agricultural production. However, the steep mountainous terrain between the resource rich areas in the high veld and the coastal ports presented a transport challenge.

Before well maintained and reliable access roads had been developed, narrow gauge railways were used extensively by South African farmers to move produce from their large farms to central sorting and packing points on their own land. As a result, entrepreneurial business people created linking railways to transport the produce from the sorting and packing points to the coastal ports. Their choice of gauge was determined by the gauge that was being used in each local area and varied between the early 1 ft 11 1/2 in (597 mm) to the later Cape gauge of 1,067 mm (3 ft 6 in).

== Original operations ==
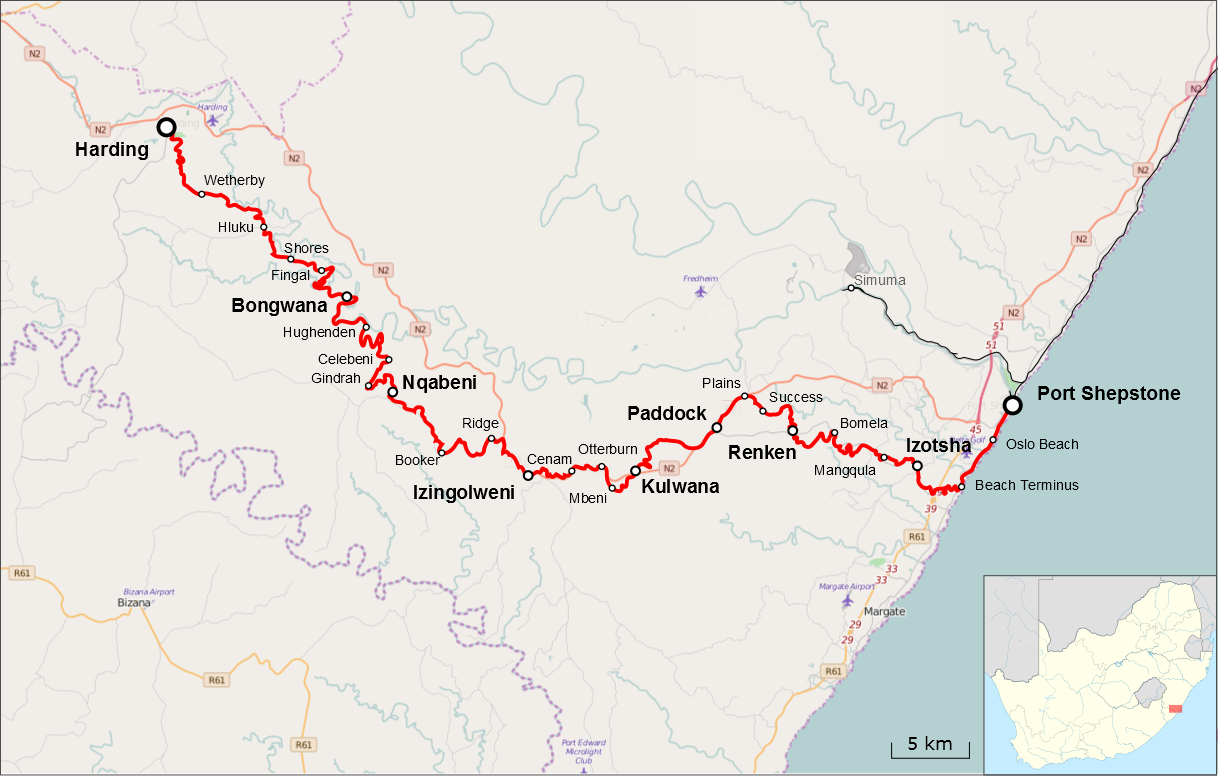
Map of Alfred County Railway

Designed as part of the Natal Government Railways' (NGR) project to transport sugar cane and bananas grown in the agricultural Harding district to Port Shepstone, the NGR commissioned Stoke-on-Trent based Kerr Stuart to build seven Class NG4 4-6-2T tank locomotives, based on the 1907 Class NG3 4-6-2T.

The route of the Alfred County Railway had some curves of 45 metres (147.6 ft), but with gradients of up to 3 in 100 / 3% (ruling grade of 1 in 37 / 2.7% for 20 miles or 32 kilometres after leaving the coast), the NG4s and their replacements were often double-headed to haul the diverse freight traffic of wood, sugar cane and bananas to Port Shepstone. The line's management decided against purchasing more powerful articulated Garratt locomotives, because their longer wheelbase would make access to the sugar cane fields more difficult.

From the mid-1970s, steam was replaced by Class 91-000 diesel-electric locomotives on the SAR's longer routes, which were more powerful. Also, being shorter in chassis length, these diesel-electric locomotives were able to access the growers' farms. Therefore, the SAR decided to transfer the NG G13 and NG G16 Garratts to the Alfred County Railway in Natal.

Due to underinvestment, the Alfred County Railway became increasingly unreliable, and was closed to operations by the SAR in 1986.

== Port Shepstone and Alfred County Railway ==
As South Africa's farmers re-entered the global markets in the late 1980s, the quality of produce going to markets became increasingly important. As handling is a key issue in the retail quality of bananas in particular, the farmers were in favour of reviving the Alfred County Railway, to reduce the amount of handling from banana plantation to port.

To raise funds and reduce government expenditure, the Government of South Africa announced it would gradually put into private hands its huge state-owned corporations, including the state electricity corporation, Eskom, and SA Transport Services which owned SAR. The Alfred County Railway was hence chosen as the pilot railway privatisation project.

In reality, SAR/Transnet still owned the line, infrastructure and the stock as a nationally strategic asset; while the new Port Shepstone and Alfred County Railway (PSACR) was granted an operational and maintenance lease for a period of 199 years. The company inherited 25 steam locomotives - of which only one, an NG G16, was operational - plus rolling stock. The company announced a business plan expected to win back lucrative business from farmers and timber growers. In March 1988, the PSACR raised funds by offering 1.8 million shares for sale at one rand each.

=== Class NG G16A ===
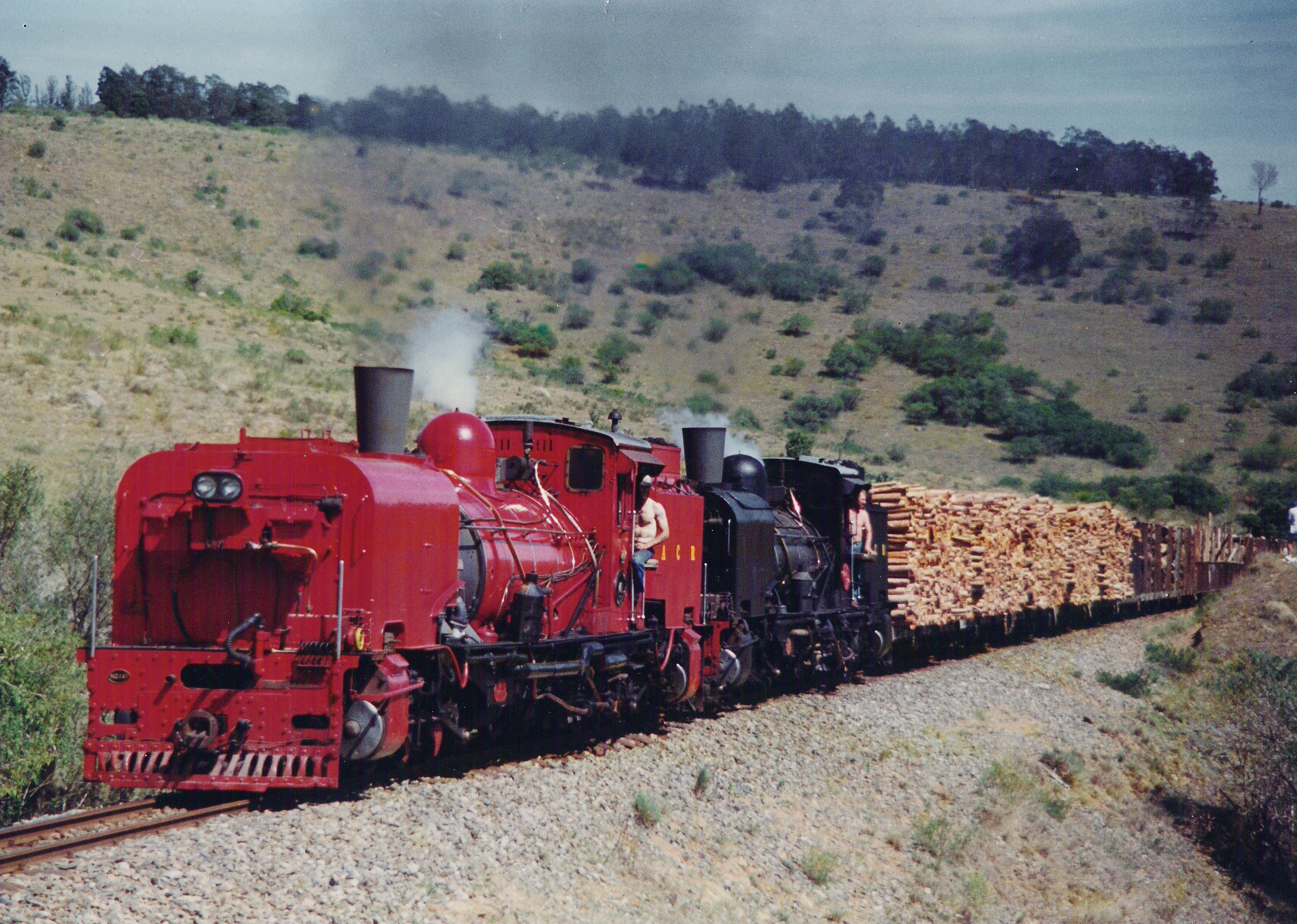
Class NG G16A 141 & 155 on the climb from Bongwana to Nqabeni, circa 1992

As part of their development to keep the railway competitive, the PSACR upgraded two of their existing Class NG G16 locomotives. The engineers incorporated developments proposed by L.D. Porta, including GPCS, Lempor exhaust, an improved spark arrestor, lightweight multi-ring articulated piston valves, improved valve events and improved mechanical lubrication. Two locomotives were modified: No. 141 in 1989 and No. 155 in 1990, and reclassified to Class NG G16A. In comparative testing No. 141 gave a fuel saving of 25% compared to a standard SAR Class NG G16 Garratt, and was easily maintained in regular service.

=== Demise to road transport ===
Initially, the venture lost money heavily, but after making profits from year three, the venture decided to try to return to an all-steam powered railway. The tourism based passenger train, the Banana Express, had always been steam powered, while the advantages of power and a short wheelbase meant that PSACR decided to lease SAR 91 Class diesels to provide hauling for commercial freight services.

The revived PSACR became Spoornet's second largest customer at Port Shepstone. This was driven by the operations of Kulu Lime and the Natal Portland Cement, plus pulpwood, poplar logs (for matchwood), creosoted telegraph poles, and manufactured wooden items from Harding. North bound inland traffic was general cargo for the farmers, such as maize, fertilizer, salt, cement, farm implements and water tanks and small parcels. The company also revived the Banana Express.

In 1991 Spoornet acquired one-million shares in PSACR, equivalent to a 28% shareholding, which gave users greater confidence in the PSACR service. The "Narrow Arrow" piggyback train was introduced for supply to the Port Shepstone pulp mill, where an entire train of 26 narrow gauge wagons was ramped onto a Spoornet train consisting of 13 wagons, having flexible connecting bridges. This eliminated the trans-shipping of timber at Port Shepstone and reduced transfer time from 14 hours to two hours. A further endeavour was the "Timbertainer," an intermodal system where pulpwood could be loaded into an open container at a plantation and taken through to the mill. Plans were in place for a similar initiative for sugar cane shipments.

However, by the mid-1990s the effects of transport deregulation began to impact of the profitability of the PSACR as larger, often overloaded, road trucks becoming ever more competitive. Although Spoornet made representations to the government, transport regulations were further relaxed to allow a higher gross vehicle mass (GVM) of 56 tonnes (55 long tons; 62 short tons), a higher axle load from 8.2 and 9.0 long tons (8.3 and 9.1 t), together with a 5% overload tolerance: the highest heavy vehicle mass with unlimited access to the roads of any country in the world.

As a result, Spoornet began to lose general freight traffic, and PSACR's reliance on trans-shipment increased transport times and costs. The railway began a gradual decline, eventually failing in 2001 when it lost the key Port Shepstone "Narrow Arrow" wood pulping contract, due to unreliability problems resulting from labour relation issues at Spoornet.

Suspending freight operations, the line continued to operate the Banana Express, but accumulated huge debts to Spoornet. As a result of these increasing debts, Transnet decided to legally force the venture into bankruptcy in 2004.

== Banana Express ==
After the termination of the PSACR lease, Patons Country Narrow Gauge Railway (PCNGR) was granted a temporary permit to continue running the Banana Express, from Port Shepstone to Paddock. The company had three locomotives available to it: NGG16 Nos.151 and 127; plus an ex-sugar estate 0-4-0T, SAR NG UVE2.

With a 6-hour journey totally devoted to tourism and enabling access to local attractions and businesses, it again became very popular with tourists because of both the scenery and the access to local businesses.

Before reaching Shelley Beach the railway traversed several river bridges, including the Tristano Bridge, along the Hibiscus Coast. The train then veered inland and chugged up through banana plantations and cane fields towards Izotsha, passed through lush sub-tropical native forests and rondavel-dotted hillsides, before stopping in Paddock for lunch and then the direct return journey.

Although PCNGR had proposals to reopen the line to Harding, in December 2005 Transnet shut the Banana Express, after they decreed a lease did not exist between SAR and PCNGR.

On 18 June 2008 a huge storm hit the coast, which resulted in large amounts of flash flooding. This damaged many of the railway's bridges along the Hibiscus Coast so that they were considered to be beyond economic repair, and washed most of the Izotsha rail bridges away.

Several steam locomotives and several carriages that were used on the Banana Express are stored at Paddock

Hamba Wehelle Express

In 2015 a short section of the railway line – between Paddock and Plains – was in use and a limited tourist service was being provided using a lightweight carriage and an industrial Hunslet diesel locomotive.

The service is known as the Hamba Wehelle Express (or Humba Weheli Express) and was operated in conjunction with the Gorgez View Bed and Breakfast/Conference Centre/Coffee Shop at Paddock; however, by 2016 the service was suspended.

== See also ==
- Avontuur Railway
- Sandstone Estates
- Welsh Highland Railway
- South African Class 91-000
- Two foot gauge railways in South Africa
