= Humewood Road railway station =

Railway station in South Africa

Coordinates: 33.971428°S 25.635438°E

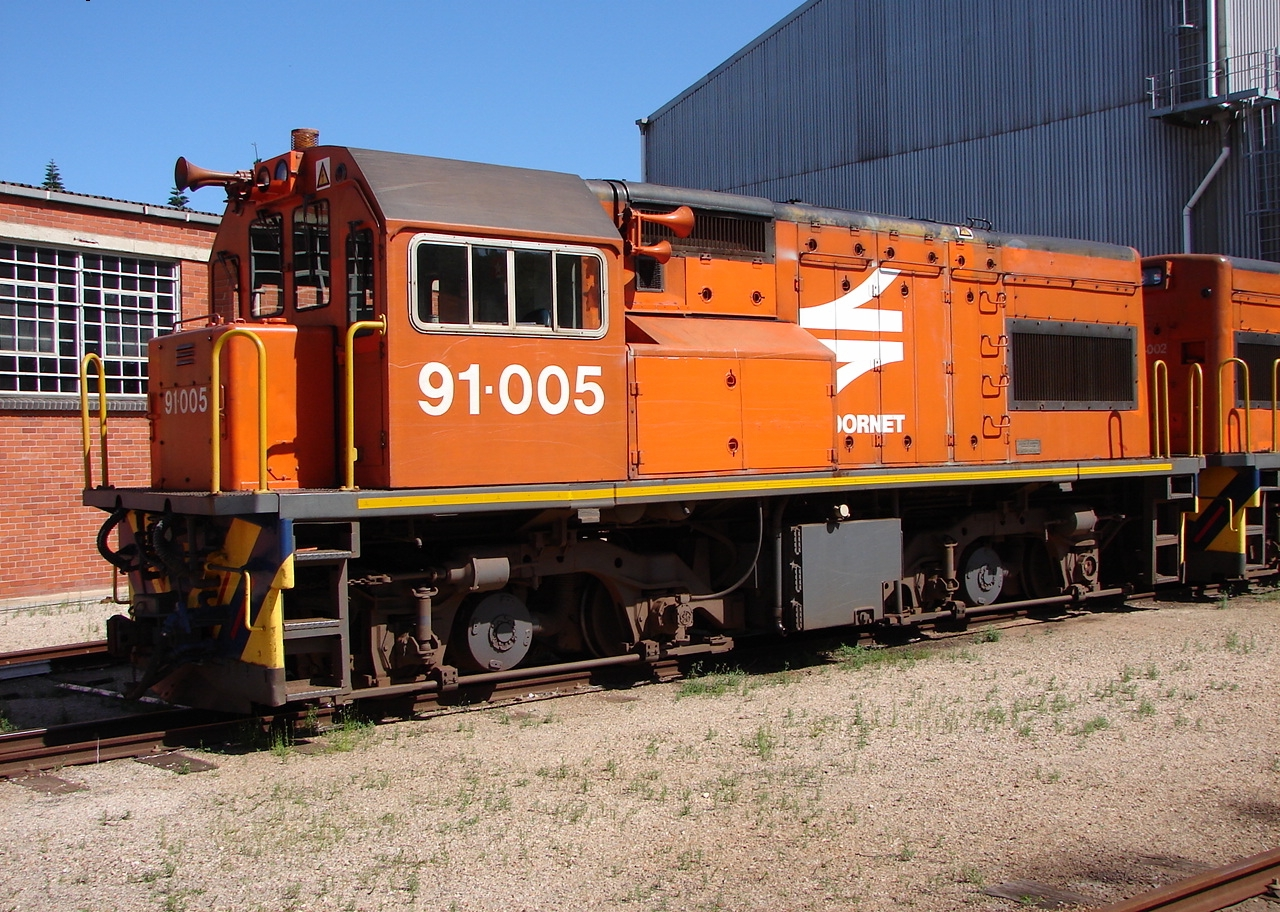
Humewood Road, Port Elizabeth, Eastern Cape

Humewood Road railway station is a railway station located in Humewood, Port Elizabeth, South Africa.

A separate station to the main Port Elizabeth railway station, built in 1899, it is the southern terminus of the narrow gauge Avontuur Railway, which at 285 kilometres (177 mi) is the longest 2 ft gauge railway in the world. The Humewood Road-Humansdorp section of the Avontuur Railway was opened in November 1905.
