= Avontuur =

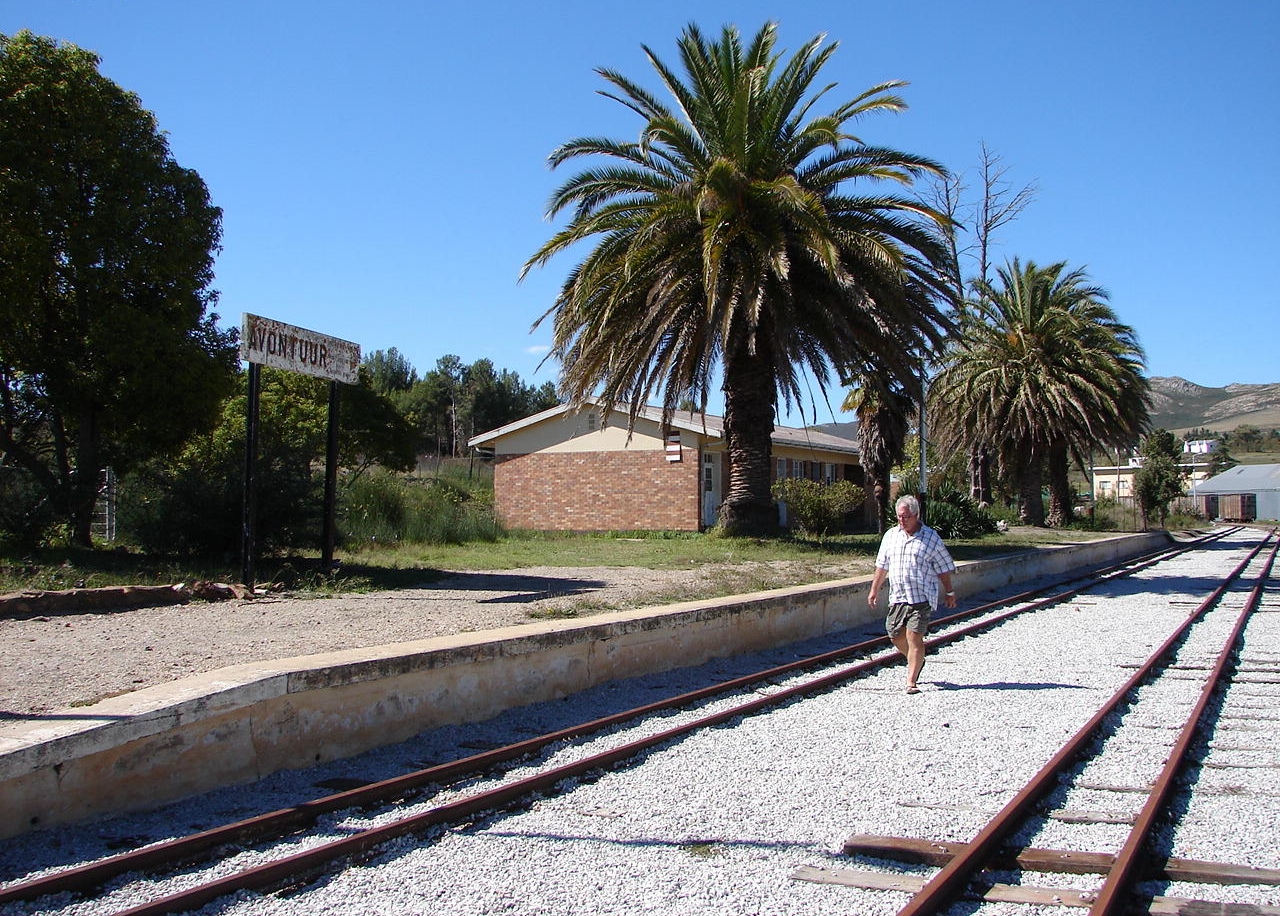
- Avontuur's narrow gauge railway station

- Location within Western Cape Location within South Africa
- Coordinates: 33.725°S 23.169°E
- Country: South Africa
- Province: Western Cape
- District: Garden Route
- Municipality: George

Population
  - Total: 238
- Time zone: UTC+2 (SAST)
- PO box: 6490
- Area code: 044

Avontuur is a town situated in the Garden Route District Municipality in the Western Cape province of South Africa. The town is located 13 km south-east of Uniondale on an intersection of the R339 and R62 regional routes.

== History ==
The name is Afrikaans for adventure; its origin, however, remains uncertain. The river from which the town takes its name was known in 1778.

== See also ==
- Avontuur Railway
- Langkloof
