= Two-foot-gauge railways in South Africa =

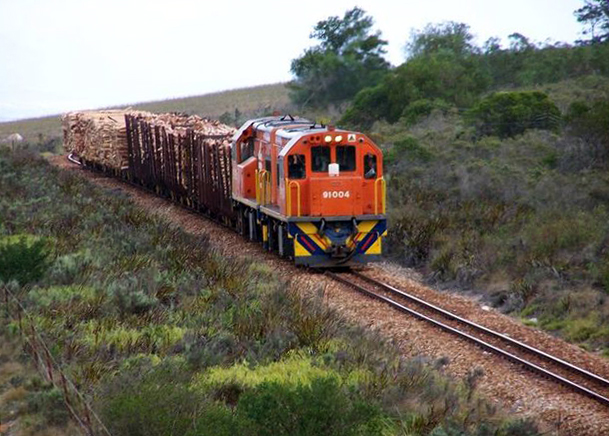
A Spoornet Class 91-000 on the Avontuur Railway near Humansdorp

In the early 1900s, 2 ft (610 mm) narrow-gauge railway lines started playing a significant role in South Africa. They facilitated the transport of various agricultural and mineral produce from locations hardly accessible by road. They therefore enabled many communities to become prosperous.

These lines featured the largest and most powerful locomotives ever in existence on two-foot-gauge railways worldwide.

All two-foot railways were operated isolated from each other. However, this did not prevent standardization and interchangeability of rolling stock and locomotives.

The larger railway lines operated their own workshops performing minor to major maintenance and/or repairs. For the purpose of major overhauls and interchangeability, rolling stock could be transported piggyback on Cape gauge rolling stock by means of a special access ramp on the break of gauge at Cape gauge junctions available on most of the two-foot lines.

Their decline started in the 1980s, the last commercial line ceased operations in the 1990s. Only a few tourist, agricultural and/or heritage railways survive. Many defunct locomotives are plinthed at various former railway station sites or work on the Welsh Highland Railway and other heritage railways in and outside South Africa.

== Nomenclature ==
It is common for South Africans to consider anything less than 1,067 mm (3 ft 6 in, Cape gauge) as a narrow-gauge railway. They are accustomed referring to "Cape gauge" as "standard gauge".

Overview

- Western Cape + Northern Cape + Eastern Cape provinces: 580 km government, 60 km private lines.
- Kwazulu-Natal: 393 km government plus approx. 500 km sugar lines.
- Gauteng + Mpumalanga: 100 km, all gone.
- Free_State: 26 km private.

== Railway lines with rails (partially) intact, operationally closed ==
=== Avontuur Railway ===
Port Elizabeth–Avontuur / Patensie

The Avontuur Railway was built from 1890 to 1905, and is 285 kilometres (177 mi) long. Extension to Patensie completed in 1914.

The Apple Express, a tourist train, ceased operations in December 2010.

Locomotives used

- CGR Type A 2-6-4T
- CGR Type C 0-4-0T
- CGR NG 0-6-0T
- CGR NG 4-6-2T
- NG3
- NG6
- NG8
- NG9
- NG10
- NG G11
- NG G12
- NG G13
- NG G14
- NG15
- NG G16
- 91-000

=== Port Shepstone–Harding ===
The Port Shepstone–Harding line was operated from 1911 to 2006, and is 122 kilometres (76 mi) long. It was closed by South African Railways in 1986 and then leased to the Alfred County Railway, which went bankrupt in 2004. The Banana Express continued under Patons Country Narrow Gauge Railway operations, having a temporary permit from Transnet and ceased operations in 2005. On 18 June 2008, a storm ruined the railway in the coastal area. A limited diesel locomotive hauled service has also operated between Paddock and Plains stations more recently.

Locomotives used

- NG4
- NG G12
- NG G13
- NG G14
- NG G16
- NG G16A
- 91-000

== Closed or converted railway lines ==
The following railways were closed or converted to Cape gauge.

=== Bezuidenhout Light Railway ===
During 1900, these two 0-4-0T locomotives were used by the 47th Field Company Royal Engineers during the construction of the Bezuidenhout Light Railway, a light narrow gauge railway line from Simmer and Jack's siding near Germiston in the Zuid-Afrikaansche Republiek to a siege camp 3.5 kilometres (2.2 miles) away along the Bezuidenhout Valley.

Locomotives used

- NG1

=== Kearsney–Stanger Light Railway ===
Operated from January 1901 to 1944, 8 miles (13 km) from Kearsney to Stanger, built and put into service at a total cost of £18,500. The track was laid with 30 lb rails and had a ruling gradient of 1 in 30. The line carried sugar and tea, passenger trains were operated until about 1930.

=== Otavi Mining and Railway Company ===
1903–1961, 567 kilometres (352 mi) in German South-West Africa (today's Namibia). Built at the gauge of 600 mm, which did not prevent exchanging locomotives with the two foot (610 mm) lines in South Africa when it was taken over by South Africa (as part of the British Empire) in 1915. Regauged to cape gauge.

Before the gauge conversion many locomotives were interchanged with the South African two foot railway systems depending on various operational considerations. After the gauge conversion the remaining stock was transferred to the two-foot lines.

The slight difference in width is because the Germans who built the Otavi Line used the metric system while the South Africans used imperial units.

=== Kalbaskraal–Hopefield–Saldanha ===
Operated from 1903 to 1926 and then re-gauged to Cape gauge. It was 46 mi (74 km) long. Originally built from Kalbaskraal to Hopefield, in 1913 the line was extended to Saldanha passing Vredenburg.

Locomotives used

- NG6
- NG7
- NG8
- NG9

Stations
Kalbaskraal–Darling–Hopefield–Vredenburg (branch)–Saldanha (Hoetjies Bay).

=== Pienaarsrivier–Pankop ===
Operated from 1906 to 1923, 15 kilometres (9.3 mi), later extended. It was built by a farmer who bought the locomotives and rolling stock from army surplus stock of the Bezuidenhout Light Railway. The line was used to haul firewood. Converted to cape gauge.

Locomotives used

- NG1
- NG6

Stations
Pienaarsrivier – Bourke – Pankop

=== South Western Railway ===
Also known as Knysna Forest Railway. Open from 1907 to 1949, 22 miles, now closed. Operated between Knysna and Diepwalle in the Southern Cape by The South Western Railway Co. Ltd.

Stations
Knysna – Bracken Hill – Parkes – Diepwalle

=== Estcourt–Weenen ===
Between 1907 and 1983, a narrow gauge railway connected Weenen with Estcourt, 47 kilometres (29 mi) to the west, and provided an outlet for its agricultural produce and was thus called the "Cabbage Express". This line was the Natal Government Railway's first venture into narrow gauge operation. Its rails were lifted. The NG G11 number 55 remained plinthed at Weenen and was later refurbished and is now used on the Paton's County Railway.

Locomotives used

- NGR Class N 4-6-2T 1906
- NG3
- NG G11
- NG G13

Stations
Estcourt–Scheepersfontein–Peniston–Haviland–Wondergeluk–Stanley–Mielietuin–Mona–New Furrow–Weenen.

=== Umzinto–Donnybrook ===
The Umzinto–Donnybrook narrow-gauge railway was in existence from 1908 to 1987 and was 93 miles long. It is now closed and its tracks were lifted however the Ixopo to Madonela branch has been rebuilt from Allwoodburn to Madonela and is use by Patons Country Railway

Locomotives used

- NG3
- NG G11
- NG G16

Stations
Umzinto–Esperanza–Nkwifa–Inverugie–Braemar–Glenrosa–Sawoti–Mbulula–Dumisa–Kenterton–Njane–Jolivet–Hlutankungu–Knockagh–Kunatha–Highflats–Rydal–Glen Beulah–Etterby–La Trappe–Ixopo with Branch to Madonela–Vause–Loch Buidhe–Crystal Manor–Lufafa Road–Mabedlana–Maxwell–Eastwolds–Carthill–Donnybrook

Stations Madonela Branch
Ixopo–Allwoodburn–Stainton–Carisbrooke–Ncalu–Madonela (Umzinkulu)

=== Umlaas Road–Mid Illovo ===
Umlaas Road to Mid Illovo, 27 miles opened in 1911 and closed 1985, with its rails lifted. Ruling gradient 1-in-30 compensated for 45.7 m (150 ft) minimum radius curves.

Locomotives used

- NG6
- NG G13

Stations
Umlaas Road–Killamy Road–Edinglassie–Tala–Eston–Ripley–Ntimbankulu–Milford–Mid Illovo.

=== Elandshoek–Mount Carmel ===
1925–1931, 12 miles, closed.

Locomotives used

- NG1

Stations
Elandshoek–Two Falls–Solarvale East–Solarvale–Indiemiddel–Mount Carmel

=== Upington–Kakamas ===
1926–1949, 55 miles, re-gauged to Cape gauge.

Locomotives used

- NG9
- NG G12
- NG G14

Stations
Upington–Keimoes–Kakamas

=== Fort Beaufort–Balfour–Seymour ===
1926–1940, 35 miles. First, a 25-mile stretch of narrow-gauge line was authorised at a cost of R130,000 between Fort Beaufort and Seymour. This line was later extended from Balfour 12 miles to Seymour. The line was re-gauged to Cape gauge between 1939 and 1940.

Locomotives used

- NG6
- NG G12
- NG G14

Stations
Fort Beaufort–Balfour–Seymour

== Heritage railways ==
=== Sandstone heritage trust ===
At Sandstone Estates near Ficksburg in the Eastern Free State, a 15 km line runs from Grootdraai in the south, northwards to the main farm, loco depot and marshalling and storage sidings at Hoekfontein and onwards via Mooihoek to a run around loop at Vailima siding. There is also a short line, known as Seb's Railway, branching to the west at Hoekfontein and running through a Game Camp to a balloon loop around a farm dam and suitable only for small locomotives.

The Sandstone Steam Railway first opened in 1999.

Its collection consists of narrow gauge stock collected from other closed 2 ft narrow gauge lines in Kwazulu Natal, elsewhere in South Africa, and from neighboring countries.. It is the largest collection of 2 ft Narrow gauge locomotives and rolling stock in the world.

=== Paton's Country Narrow Gauge Railway ===
The Paton's Country Narrow Gauge Railway runs from Allwoodburn station Ixopo to Umzinkulu (Madonela). It was opened in 2000 on a branch of the former Umzinto–Donnybrook narrow-gauge railway line.

Locomotives used

- NG G11, two Avonside sugar cane locss and two 4-cylinder Hunslet diesel shunter,.

== Agricultural railways ==
=== Zebediela Sugar Estates ===
At Zebediela. Closed 1959.

Locomotives used

- NG2
- NG6

=== Sezela, Sugar railway system ===
At Sezela. A 125-mile cane sugar rail network. Built in 1914 and closed in the 1970s.

=== Umtwalumi Valley Estate ===
A sugar plantation in Natal.

Locomotives used

- Hunslet 0-4-2 tank locomotive.

=== Renishaw Estates ===
Locomotives used

- Hunslet 0-4-2 tank locomotive.

=== Chaka's Kraal Estate ===
A sugar plantation.

=== Tongaat Sugar Estates, Natal. ===
Locomotives used

- Bagnall 4-4-0T

=== Darnall and Felixton sugar estates ===
Locomotives used

- Various Bagnall.

== Industrial ==
=== Belville quarry ===
SAR's Bellville quarry in the Tygerberg hill, employing Zwillinge locomotives.

=== Eastern Province Cement Company (EPCC) ===
Ran a private Branch from Chelsea junction at the Avontuur Railway to its cement factory at New Brighton in Port Elizabeth. Locomotives included a 33-ton 4-6-2 built by Baldwin Locomotive Works with a separate 23-ton tender carrying 5 tons of coal and 2,040 US gal (7,700 L) of water. This locomotive, numbered 2, had a 43-inch (1.1 m) diameter boiler producing 160 psi (1,100 kPa) steam to 13.5-inch (34.4 cm) diameter cylinders through an 18-inch (46 cm) stroke powering 36-inch (92 cm) diameter drivers. In 1973, it was wrecked after a runaway accident, and after years of idleness it was shipped to the Brecon Mountain Railway in Wales. The rebuild started in 1990 and the locomotive went back to service in 1997.

The EPCC also operated a South African Class NG8 4-6-0 and two 300 HP Funkey diesel-mechanical B-B locomotives which were also shipped to Wales to be used on the Welsh Highland Railway (unaltered) and the Ffestiniog Railway, the latter implying the construction of a new body to be able to negotiate the strict loading gauge of that railway.

A third diesel, a three axle hunslet, survived in South Africa

=== Rustenburg Platinum Mines ===
????–1981. Approximately 10 miles. Platinum ore railway. Converted to Cape gauge.

=== Vogelspruit Gold Mining Areas Ltd ===
Converted to Cape gauge.

=== West Rand Consolidated Mines ===
In Krugersdorp, using a CGR Type C 0-4-0T.

== See also ==
- Rail transport in South Africa
- List of South African locomotive classes
- List of abandoned railway lines in South Africa
- Sandstone Estates
