= South African Class NG G12 2-6-2+2-6-2 =

1927 articulated narrow-gauge steam locomotive

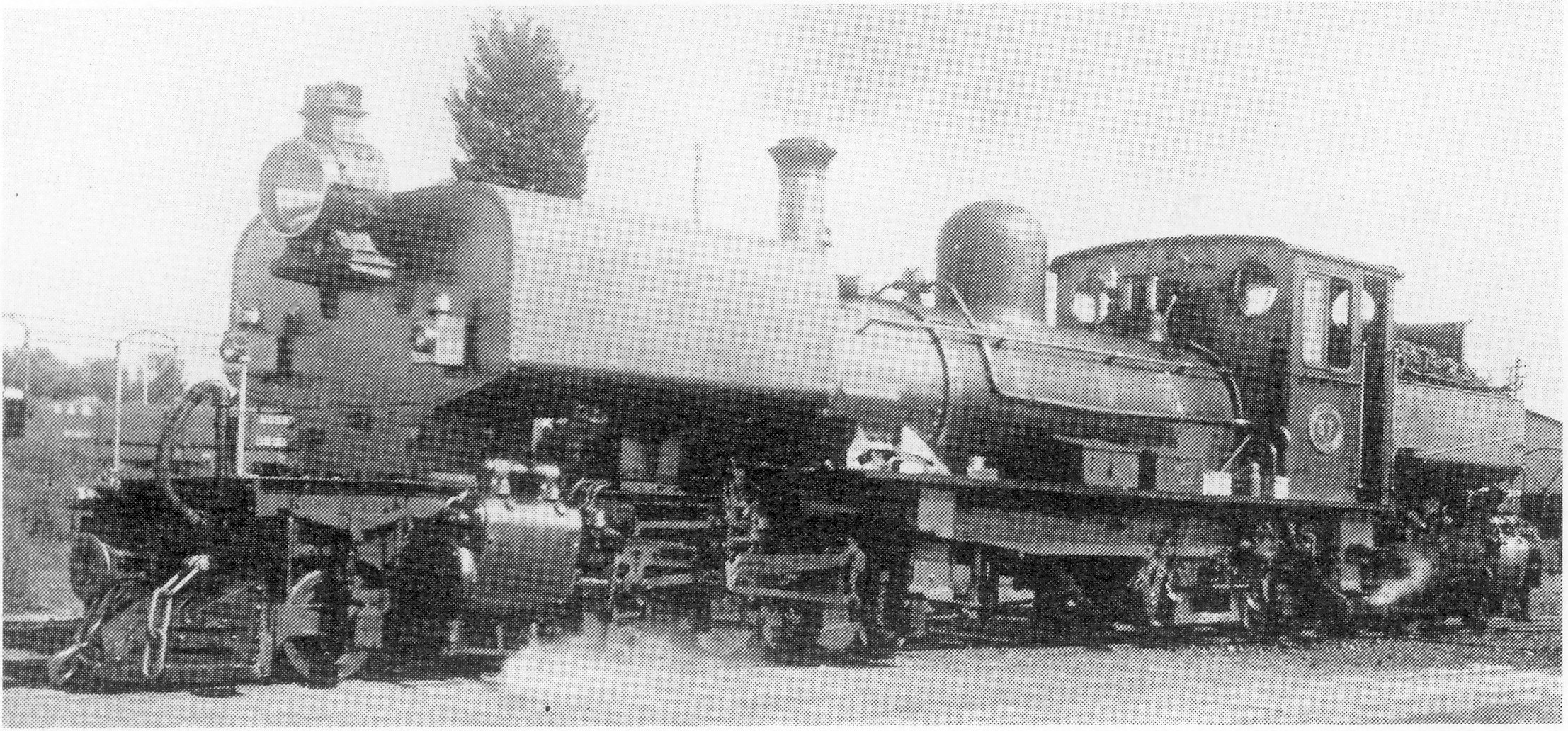
- Class NG G12 no. 57, c. 1930
Type and origin
- Power type: Steam
- Designer: Beyer, Peacock & Company
- Builder: Société Franco-Belge
- Serial number: BP 6365-6366, FB 2506-2507
- Model: Class NG G12
- Build date: 1927
- Total produced: 2
Specifications
- Configuration
  - Whyte: 2-6-2+2-6-2
  - UIC: 1'C1'+1'C1'h4t
- Driver: 3rd & 4th coupled axles
- Gauge: 2 ft (610 mm) narrow
- Leading dia.: 21 in (533 mm)
- Coupled dia.: 30 in (762 mm)
- Trailing dia.: 21 in (533 mm)
- Wheelbase: 40 ft (12,192 mm)
  - Engine: 12 ft 7 1/2 in (3,848 mm) each
  - Coupled: 5 ft 9 in (1,753 mm) each
- Pivot centres: 21 ft (6,401 mm)
- Length
  - Over couplers: 45 ft 10 in (13,970 mm)
- Height: 10 ft (3,048 mm)
- Frame type: Plate
- Axle load: 3 LT 15 cwt (3,810 kg)
  - Leading: 3 LT 10 cwt (3,556 kg) front 3 LT 10 cwt (3,556 kg) rear
  - Coupled: 3 LT 15 cwt (3,810 kg)
  - Trailing: 3 LT 5 cwt (3,302 kg) front 3 LT 5 cwt (3,302 kg) rear
- Adhesive weight: 22 LT 10 cwt (22,860 kg)
- Loco weight: 36 LT (36,580 kg)
- Fuel type: Coal
- Fuel capacity: 2 LT (2.0 t)
- Water cap.: 800 imp gal (3,640 L) front 200 imp gal (909 L) rear
- Firebox
  - Type: Round-top
  - Grate area: 10.5 sq ft (0.98 m^{2})
- Boiler
  - Pitch: 5 ft 3 in (1,600 mm)
  - Diameter: 3 ft 6 3/8 in (1,076 mm)
  - Tube plates: 8 ft 6 in (2,591 mm)
  - Small tubes: 73: 1 3/4 in (44 mm)
  - Large tubes: 10: 5 1/4 in (133 mm)
- Boiler pressure: 180 psi (1,241 kPa)
- Safety valve: Pop
- Heating surface
  - Firebox: 45 sq ft (4.2 m^{2})
  - Tubes: 378.5 sq ft (35.16 m^{2})
  - Total surface: 423.5 sq ft (39.34 m^{2})
- Superheater
  - Heating area: 97.5 sq ft (9.06 m^{2})
- Cylinder size: 8 1/2 in (216 mm) bore 16 in (406 mm) stroke
- Valve gear: Walschaerts
- Valve type: Piston
- Couplers: Johnston link-and-pin Bell-and-hook (Langkloof)
Performance figures
- Tractive effort: 10,400 lbf (46 kN) @ 75%
Career
- Operators: South African Railways
- Class: Class NG G12
- Number in class: 2
- Numbers: 56, 57
- Delivered: 1927
- First run: 1927
- Withdrawn: 1952
- Scrapped: 1959
- Disposition: Both scrapped

The South African Railways Class NG G12 2-6-2+2-6-2 of 1927 was an articulated narrow-gauge steam locomotive.

In 1927, the South African Railways (SAR) placed two Class NG G12 Garratt articulated 2-6-2+2-6-2 steam locomotives in service. They were the smallest Garratt locomotives to see service in South Africa.

== Manufacturer ==
The five Class NG G11 Garratt narrow-gauge locomotives which had been placed in service on the Avontuur line in the Langkloof and the Stuartstown line in Natal between 1919 and 1925 had met with success. As a result, F.R. Collins, Chief Mechanical Engineer of the South African Railways (SAR), decided to acquire a smaller Garratt type for two new light-rail narrow-gauge branch lines which were completed in 1926. In 1927, an orders was placed with Beyer, Peacock & Company for the design and construction of two lightweight narrow-gauge 2-6-2+2-6-2 Garratt locomotives.

Beyer, Peacock sub-contracted their construction and the two locomotives were delivered by the Belgian locomotive builders Société Franco-Belge in November 1927. They were allocated separate works numbers by Beyer, Peacock as well as Franco-Belge and were numbered NG56 and NG57 upon delivery.

== Characteristics ==
The locomotives were superheated, with outside plate frames, Walschaerts valve gear, inclined cylinders, piston valves and round-topped fireboxes. Designed for light 20 pounds per yard (9.9 kilograms per metre) rail, their lightness of construction made them popular with the fitters who had to maintain them.

== Classification ==
The system of grouping narrow-gauge locomotives into classes was only adopted by the SAR somewhere between 1928 and 1930 and, at that point, these two locomotives were designated Class NG G12, with the letters "NG" indicating narrow gauge and the "G" prefix to the classification number identifying it as a Garratt locomotive.

== Service ==
The Class NG G12 was obtained for use on the new narrow-gauge lines from Fort Beaufort to Seymour and from Upington to Kakamas which had been completed in 1926, since it had become obvious that the Class NG6 Lawleys which had been used during the construction of these lines would not be able to cope with the expected daily traffic once the lines were in full operation.

Upon arrival, the two locomotives were first put to work in South West Africa for a trial period, after which no. NG56 was assigned to Upington and no. NG57 to Fort Beaufort.

While they both mostly remained with their assigned depots, they were at times temporarily assigned to narrow-gauge branch lines in other areas of the country to assist with seasonal demands on those branches. In 1940, when the Seymour branch was regauged to Cape gauge, no. NG57 was also assigned to the Kakamas branch. Both remained there until 1949, when the Kakamas line was also widened to Cape gauge and they were returned to South West Africa for a brief period. From there, no. NG56 was allocated to Port Shepstone in Natal and no. NG57 to Humewood Road in Port Elizabeth, where they remained until both were withdrawn from service in 1952.

Both locomotives were subsequently sold to the Rustenburg Platinum Mines, no. NG56 in 1952 and no. NG57 in 1953, where they were renumbered 5 and 6 respectively. They were both scrapped in 1959.
