= Paton's Country Narrow Gauge Railway =

Railway in South Africa

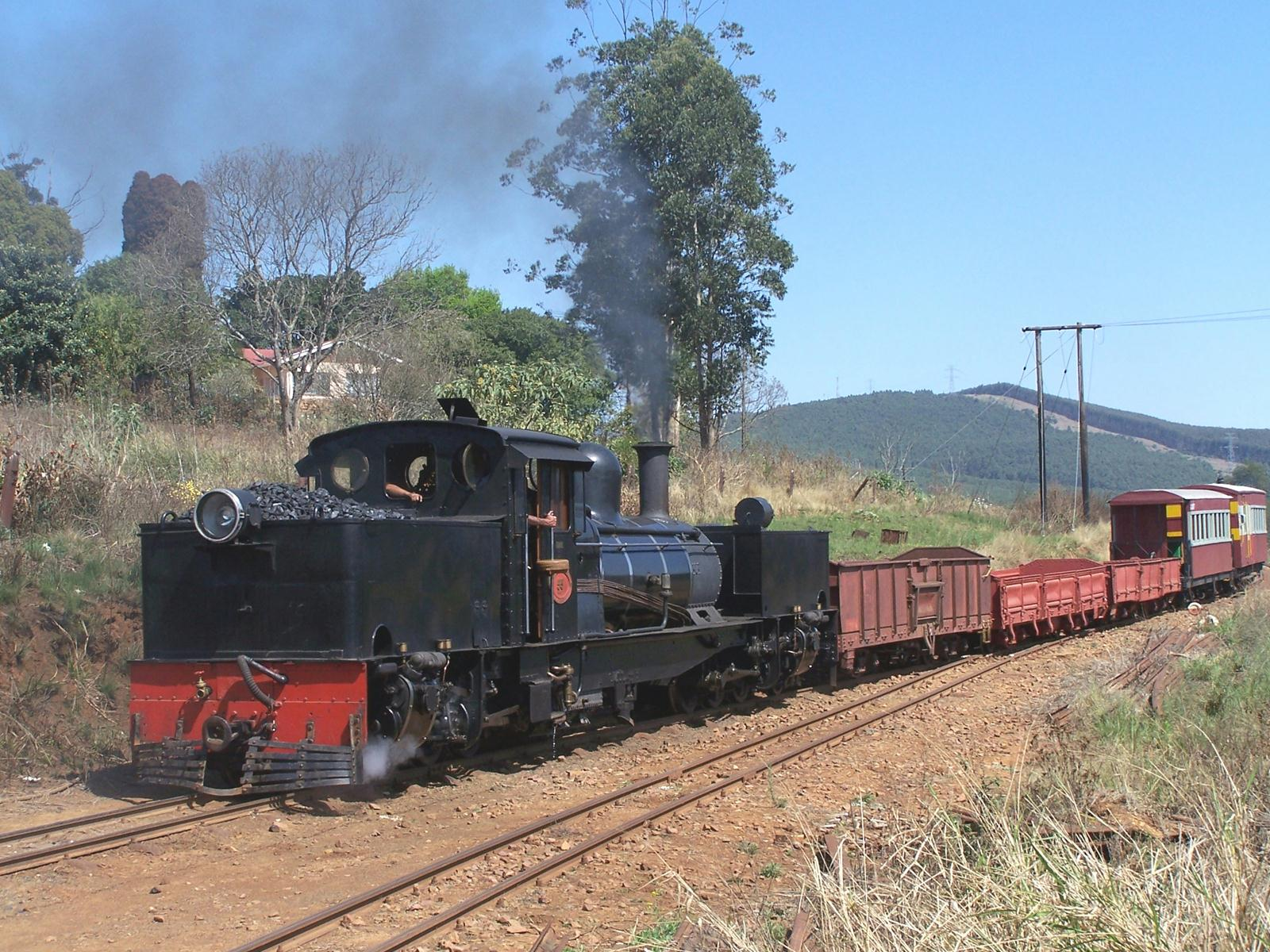
SAR Class NG G11 NG55 (2-6-0+0-6-2) Garratt-type steam locomotive hauling a mixed train approaching Ixopo, KwaZulu-Natal. This locomotive (No 55) was built in 1925 and spent most of its working life on the Estcourt-Weenen line. It now runs on the Patons Country Narrow Gauge Railway.

The Paton's Country Narrow Gauge Railway (PCNGR) is a 2 ft (610 mm) narrow-gauge heritage railway in KwaZulu-Natal, South Africa.

In 2000, the PCNGR was reconstructed from Allwoodburn Siding at Ixopo to Umzimkhulu, along the former branch of the Umzinto–Donnybrook narrow-gauge railway, closed around 1985.

As the line was partially lifted after closure, the line was in need of a complete rebuild.

Gradually, a fleet of locomotives and rolling stock was acquired from various closed railways in Natal and elsewhere.

Currently steam and diesel heritage trains run from Ixopo (Allwoodburn Siding) to Carrisbrooke and the service is to be extended to Umzinkulu and then to a new terminus closer to the township of Madonela when practicable

Patons Narrow Gauge was also involved in operating the Banana Express, which ceased operations in 2006. Later in conjunction with Gorgez View Lodge a small diesel hauled train was operated as the Hamba Wehelie Express along the small part of the Banana Express route between Paddock and Plains stations.

Locomotives used at Ixopo: NG G11 No. 55, two Avonside sugar cane locomotives and two 4 Cylinder Diesel Hunslet shunters.

In 2015 two Class 91-000 diesel-electric locomotives, numbers 91-006 and 91-007, were received and put into service at Ixopo.

== See also ==
- Alfred County Railway
- Two foot gauge railways in South Africa
- Banana Express
