= CGR Type C 0-4-0T =

Type of steam locomotive

CGR Type C 0-4-0T Midget South African NG 0-4-0T 1902
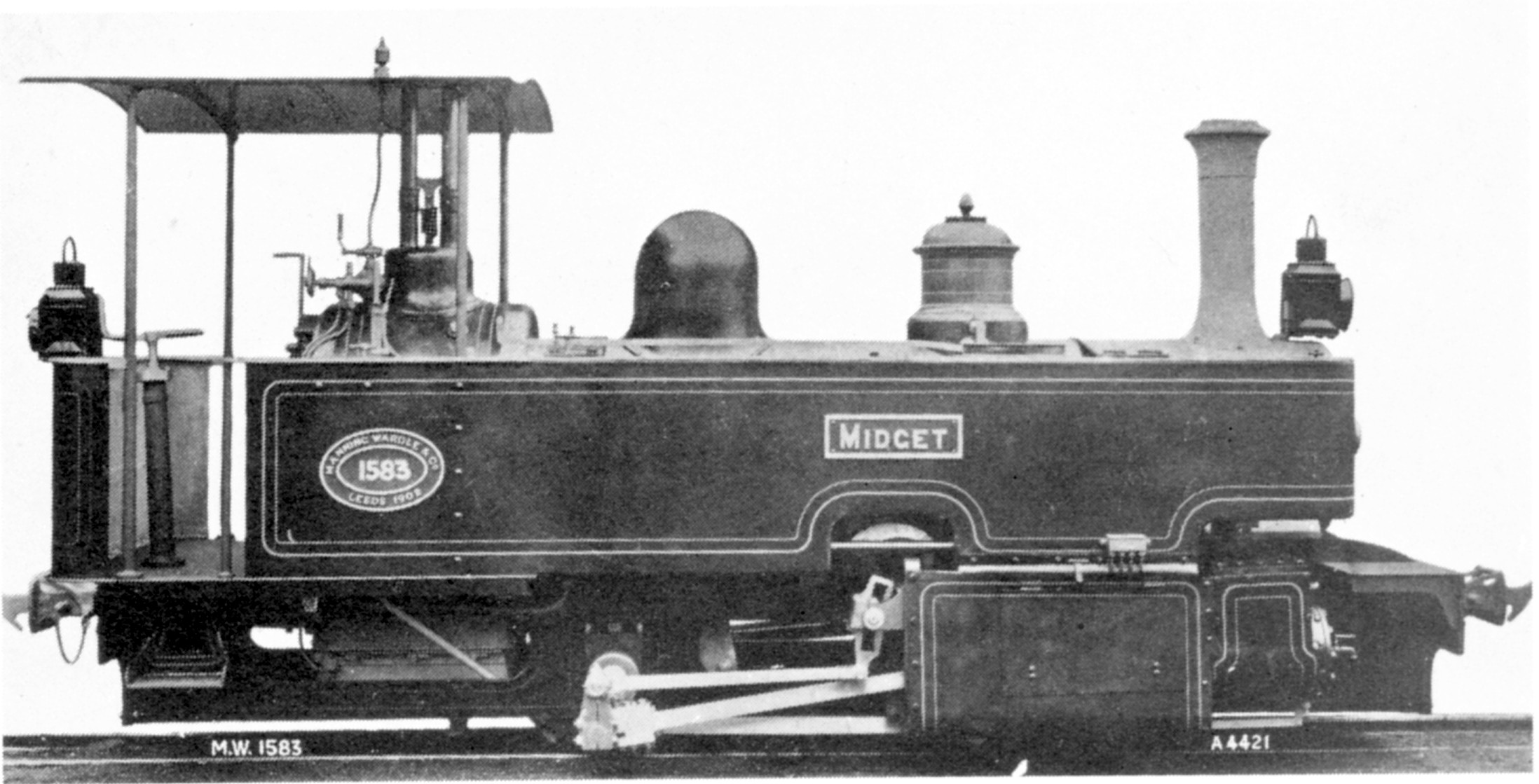
- CGR Type C 0-4-0T no. 41 of 1902
Type and origin
- Power type: Steam
- Designer: Manning Wardle & Company
- Builder: Manning Wardle & Company
- Order number: 52400
- Serial number: 1583
- Build date: Ex works 7 November 1902
Specifications
- Configuration
  - Whyte: 0-4-0T
  - UIC: Bn2t
- Driver: 2nd coupled
- Gauge: 2 ft (610 mm) narrow
- Coupled dia.: 26 in (660 mm)
- Wheelbase: 4 ft 6 in (1,372 mm)
- Length
  - Over couplers: 19 ft 9 1/2 in (6,032 mm)
- Width: 6 ft 3 in (1,905 mm)
- Height: 8 ft 4 in (2,540 mm)
- Axle load: 7 LT 10 cwt (7,620 kg)
- Adhesive weight: 15 LT (15,240 kg)
- Loco weight: 15 LT (15,240 kg)
- Fuel type: Coal
- Fuel capacity: 500 lb (230 kg)
- Water cap.: 400 imp gal (1,820 L)
- Firebox
  - Type: Round-top
  - Grate area: 5 sq ft (0.46 m^{2})
- Boiler
  - Pitch: 4 ft (1,219 mm)
  - Diameter: 2 ft 4 in (711 mm)
- Boiler pressure: 140 psi (965 kPa)
- Cylinders: Two
- Cylinder size: 9 in (229 mm) bore 14 in (356 mm) stroke
- Valve gear: Walschaerts
- Loco brake: Steam brakes
- Couplers: Bell-and-hook
Performance figures
- Tractive effort: 4,580 lbf (20.4 kN) @ 75%
Career
- Operators: Cape Government Railways; South African Railways; West Rand Consolidated Mines
- Class: Type C
- Numbers: CGR 41, SAR NG20
- Official name: Midget, Taffy
- Delivered: 1902
- First run: 1902
- Withdrawn: 1921
- Restored: c. 1981

The Cape Government Railways Type C 0-4-0T Midget of 1902 was a South African steam locomotive from the pre-Union era in the Cape of Good Hope.

In 1902, the Cape Government Railways placed a single 0-4-0T narrow gauge steam locomotive in service on the Avontuur branch. In 1912, this locomotive was assimilated into the South African Railways and renumbered. It was sold to the West Rand Consolidated Mines near Krugersdorp in 1921.

== Manufacturer ==
The locomotive was built and delivered by Manning Wardle and Company in 1902, with works number 1583. Named Midget, it was designated Type C and numbered 41 on the Cape Government Railways (CGR). The locomotive was delivered with an open cab, roofed, but not enclosed. To offer better protection to the crew, a spectacle plate and enclosed sides were added at some point soon after it entered service.

== Service ==
=== Cape Government Railways ===
The engine Midget was placed in service on the Avontuur branch out of Port Elizabeth, where it was employed on construction work and as shunting engine. It was also used to haul short two-coach passenger trains, based on the light railways premise that a light engine on low-volume passenger service would reduce running costs by 50% compared to larger locomotives.

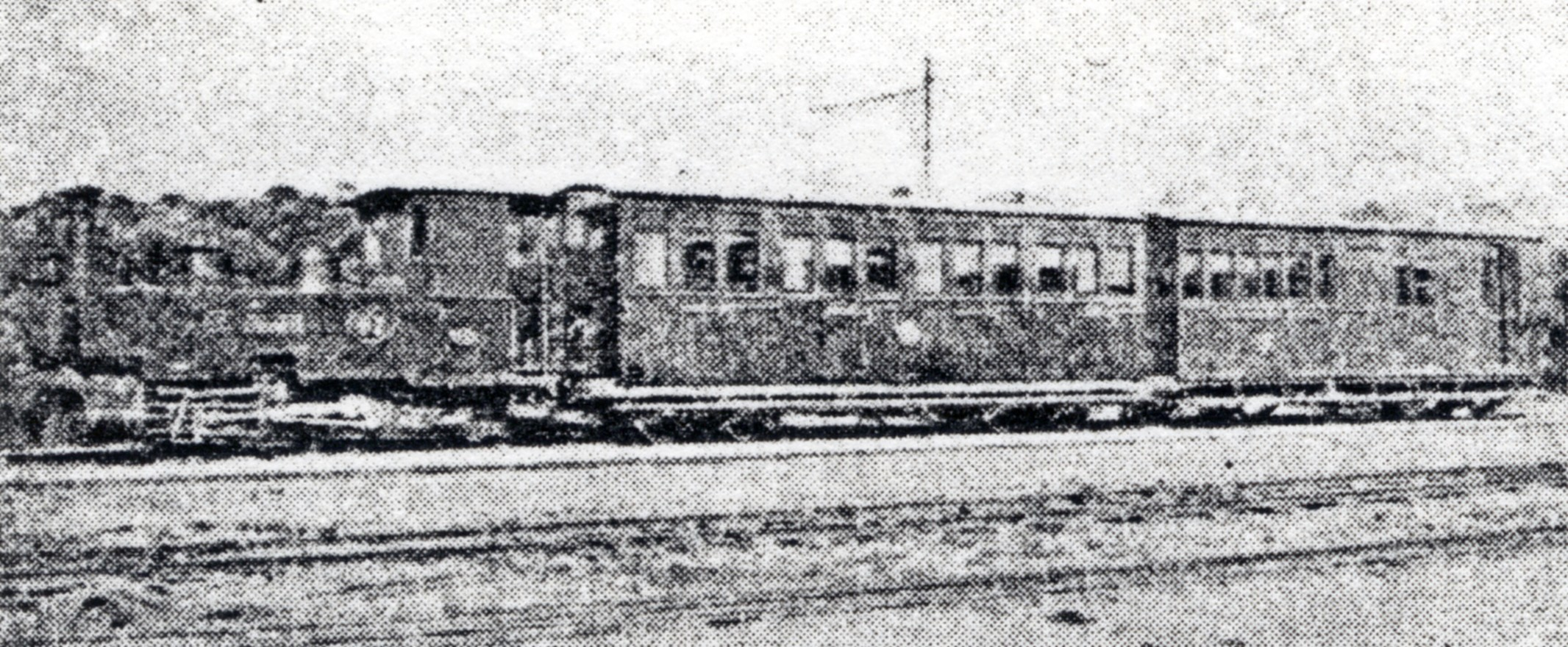
Type C on light passenger service

The locomotive is reputed to have worked light two-carriage suburban passenger trains on the Walmer branch in Port Elizabeth at half the cost of the Type A and Type B locomotives. It was therefore possible to cater for traffic which, with the larger engines, would have been unremunerative.

=== South African Railways ===
When the Union of South Africa was established on 31 May 1910, the three Colonial government railways (CGR, Natal Government Railways and Central South African Railways) were united under a single administration to control and administer the railways, ports and harbours of the Union. Although the South African Railways and Harbours came into existence in 1910, the actual classification and renumbering of all the rolling stock of the three constituent railways were only implemented with effect from 1 January 1912.

In 1912, the locomotive was renumbered to no. NG20 on the South African Railways (SAR), with the letters NG identifying it as a narrow gauge locomotive in the SAR registers. In 1921, it was sold to the West Rand Consolidated Mines in Krugersdorp.

== Preservation ==
Upon eventually being withdrawn from service at the mines, the engine Midget was placed in storage until the Crown Mines Museum was established south of Johannesburg. The locomotive was restored, renamed Taffy and worked at Gold Reef City, as the museum was later named, until it was eventually retired once more and placed on static display at the museum.

== Illustration ==
The following pictures show the engine Taffy in service at Gold Reef City in January 1982.

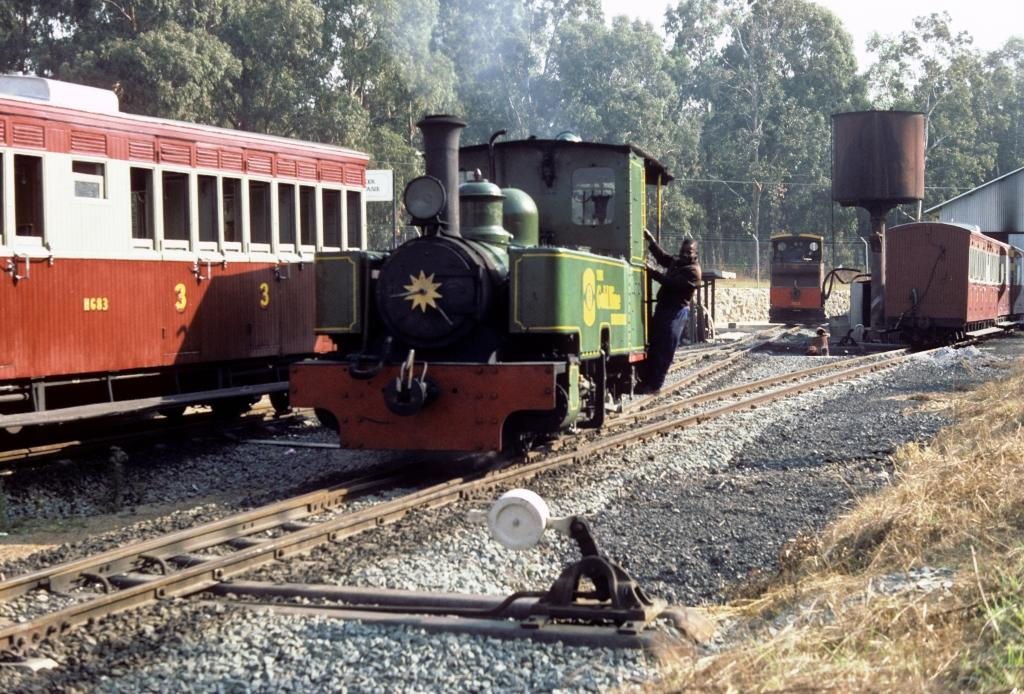

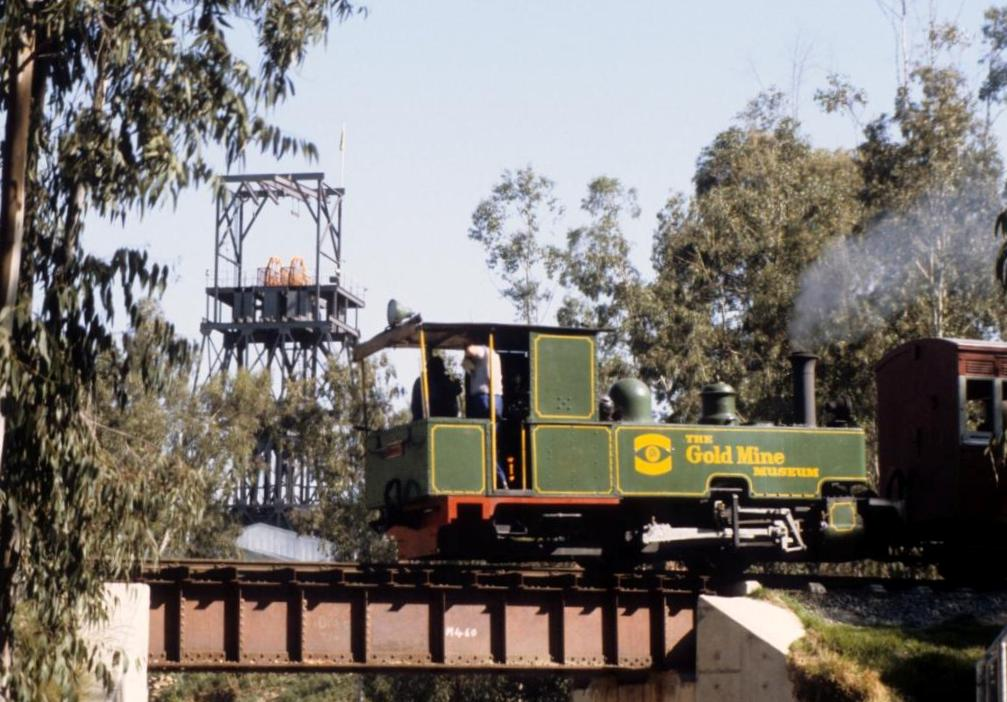

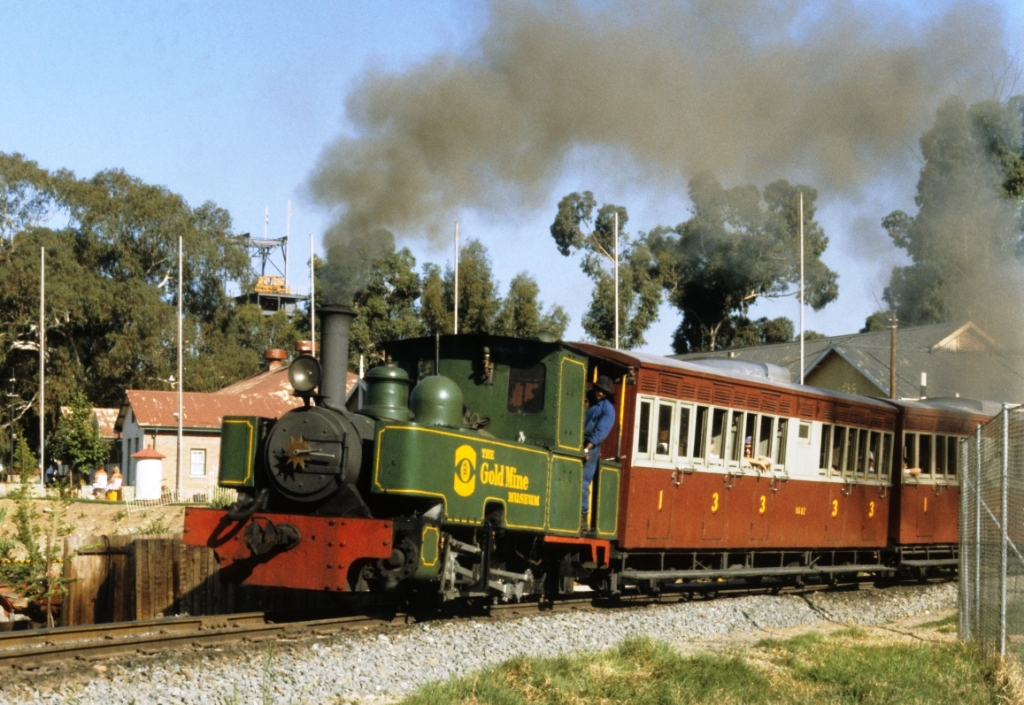
