= South African Class NG9 4-6-0 =

1915 narrow-gauge steam locomotive

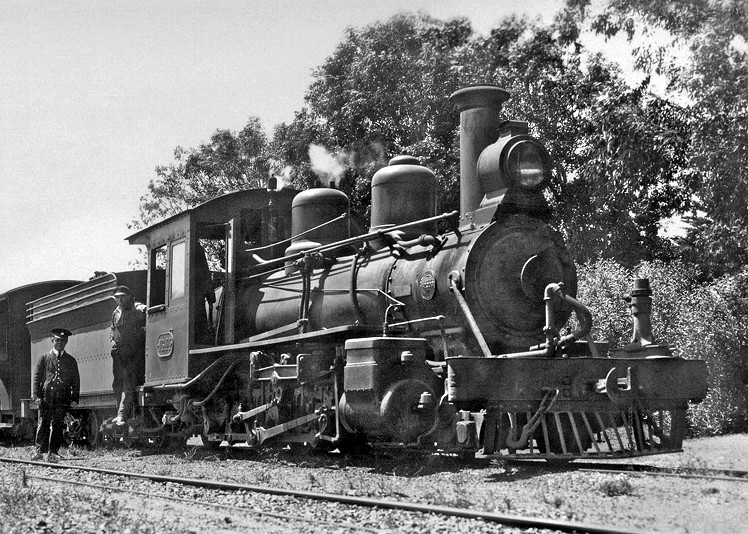
- Class NG9, c. 1930
Type and origin
- Power type: Steam
- Designer: Baldwin Locomotive Works
- Builder: Baldwin Locomotive Works
- Serial number: 42301-42306
- Build date: 1915
- Total produced: 6
Specifications
- Configuration
  - Whyte: 4-6-0
  - UIC: 2'Cn2
- Driver: 2nd coupled axle
- Gauge: 2 ft (610 mm) narrow
- Leading dia.: 22 in (559 mm)
- Coupled dia.: 33 in (838 mm)
- Tender wheels: 22 in (559 mm)
- Wheelbase: 36 ft 10 in (11,227 mm)
  - Axle spacing (Asymmetrical): 1-2: 3 ft 3 in (991 mm); 2-3: 3 ft (914 mm)
  - Engine: 13 ft 1 in (3,988 mm)
  - Leading: 4 ft (1,219 mm)
  - Coupled: 6 ft 3 in (1,905 mm)
  - Tender: 13 ft 7 in (4,140 mm)
  - Tender bogie: 4 ft 1 in (1,245 mm)
- Length
  - Over couplers: 44 ft 4 3/8 in (13,522 mm)
- Height: 10 ft 4 1/4 in (3,156 mm)
- Axle load: 5 LT 16 cwt (5,893 kg)
  - Leading: 4 LT (4,064 kg)
  - 1st coupled: 5 LT 7 cwt (5,436 kg)
  - 2nd coupled: 5 LT 16 cwt (5,893 kg)
  - 3rd coupled: 5 LT 2 cwt (5,182 kg)
  - Tender bogie: 10 LT 6 cwt (10,470 kg)
  - Tender axle: 5 LT 3 cwt (5,233 kg) average
- Adhesive weight: 16 LT 5 cwt (16,510 kg)
- Loco weight: 20 LT 5 cwt (20,570 kg)
- Tender weight: 20 LT 16 cwt 2 qtr (21,160 kg)
- Total weight: 41 LT 1 cwt 2 qtr (41,730 kg)
- Tender type: 2-axle bogies
- Fuel type: Coal
- Fuel capacity: 5 LT (5.1 t)
- Water cap.: 1,250 imp gal (5,680 L)
- Firebox
  - Type: Round-top
  - Grate area: 7.5 sq ft (0.70 m^{2})
- Boiler
  - Pitch: 4 ft 8 5/16 in (1,430 mm)
  - Diameter: 3 ft 2 1/8 in (968 mm)
  - Tube plates: 10 ft 8 in (3,251 mm)
  - Small tubes: 67: 2 in (51 mm)
- Boiler pressure: 180 psi (1,241 kPa)
- Heating surface
  - Firebox: 43.4 sq ft (4.03 m^{2})
  - Tubes: 381 sq ft (35.4 m^{2})
  - Total surface: 424.4 sq ft (39.43 m^{2})
- Cylinders: Two
- Cylinder size: 11 3/4 in (298 mm) bore 16 in (406 mm) stroke
- Valve gear: Walschaerts
- Valve type: Slide
- Couplers: Bell-and-hook
Performance figures
- Tractive effort: 9,036 lbf (40.19 kN) @ 75%
Career
- Operators: South African Railways; Moçâmedes Railway
- Class: Class NG9
- Number in class: 6
- Numbers: NG42-NG47
- Delivered: 1915–1916
- First run: 1915
- Withdrawn: 1951
- The 2nd coupled axle had flangeless wheels

The South African Railways Class NG9 4-6-0 of 1915 was a narrow-gauge steam locomotive.

During 1915 and 1916, the South African Railways placed six 4-6-0 steam locomotives in service on the Langkloof narrow-gauge railway. When a system of grouping narrow-gauge locomotives into classes was eventually introduced somewhere between 1928 and 1930, they were classified as Class NG9.

== Manufacturer ==
Due to the outbreak of the First World War in 1914, the usual British locomotive suppliers were hard pressed to satisfy British requirements at the time, let alone those of other parts of the world. As a result, the South African Railways (SAR) placed an order with the Baldwin Locomotive Works in the United States of America in 1915 for six narrow-gauge 4-6-0 locomotives. They were all built by August 1915 and were delivered to the SAR in 1915 and 1916, numbered in the range from NG42 to NG47.

== Characteristics ==
The locomotives were very similar to the Bagnall-built Type B locomotives which had been delivered to the Cape Government Railways (CGR) in 1903, except that they were equipped with Walschaerts valve gear.

== Service ==
=== South African Railways ===
They were erected at the Uitenhage workshops and placed in service on the Walmer branchline of the Langkloof railway between Port Elizabeth and Avontuur. They all remained in service there until 1929, although some were at one time also employed to help out on the line from Kalbaskraal to Saldanha in the Western Cape.

The system of grouping narrow-gauge locomotives into classes was only adopted by the SAR somewhere between 1928 and 1930 and, at that point, these locomotives were designated Class NG9.

The Walmer branch succumbed to bus competition and was closed on 26 November 1928, after being in operation for over twenty years. Numbers NG42 and NG43 were withdrawn from service in 1929. In that same year, numbers NG44 and NG46 were transferred to Upington to work on the branchline to Kakamas. The last remaining one of these locomotives on the Avontuur railway, no. NG45, was relieved from line work and retained at Humewood Road in Port Elizabeth for yard duties until 1939, when it was also transferred to Upington and replaced by Class NG3 tank engine no. NG5 from Natal.

=== Moçâmedes Railway ===
The three locomotives at Upington, numbers NG44, NG45 and NG46, survived in SAR service until April 1951 when they were sold to the Caminhos de Ferro de Moçâmedes (CFM) of Angola.

They were numbered 111 to 113 on the CFM, apparently not in the same order as their old SAR engine numbers, and were placed in service on the Ramal da Chibía, a 600 mm (1 ft 11 5/8 in) narrow-gauge branchline across 116 kilometres (72 miles) from Sá da Bandeira (now Lubango) to Chiange.

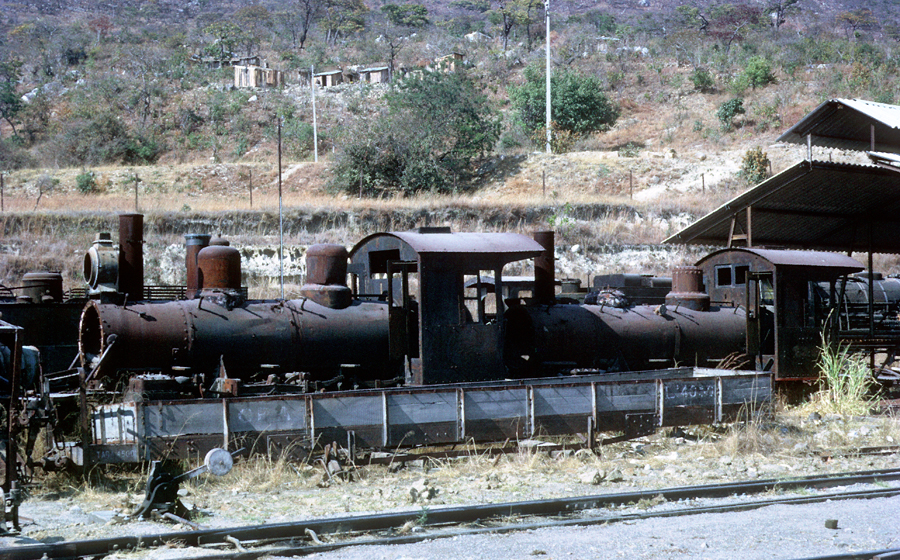
CF Moçâmedes no. 111 (right) and possibly no. 113 (left), at the Sa da Bandeira shops, Angola, 7 August 1972

This branch was opened in two stages in 1949 and 1953. It is believed the three locomotives also worked on the mainline from Moçâmedes to Sá da Bandeira (now Lubango), until that line was regauged to Cape gauge in the mid-1950s.

They were possibly retired at about this time, being replaced on the branchline by 60-Series 0-8-2T locomotives which were released by the regauging of the mainline. In later years, these 0-8-2T locomotives were equipped with the NG9 tenders to increase their wood and water carrying capacity.

The Class NG9 locomotives were observed dumped at the Sá da Bandeira shops by 1969, without their tenders. At the time it appeared as if they had been in that condition for some time. The branchline itself was closed in 1970.
