= South African Class NG G14 2-6-2+2-6-2 =

1931 articulated narrow-gauge steam locomotive

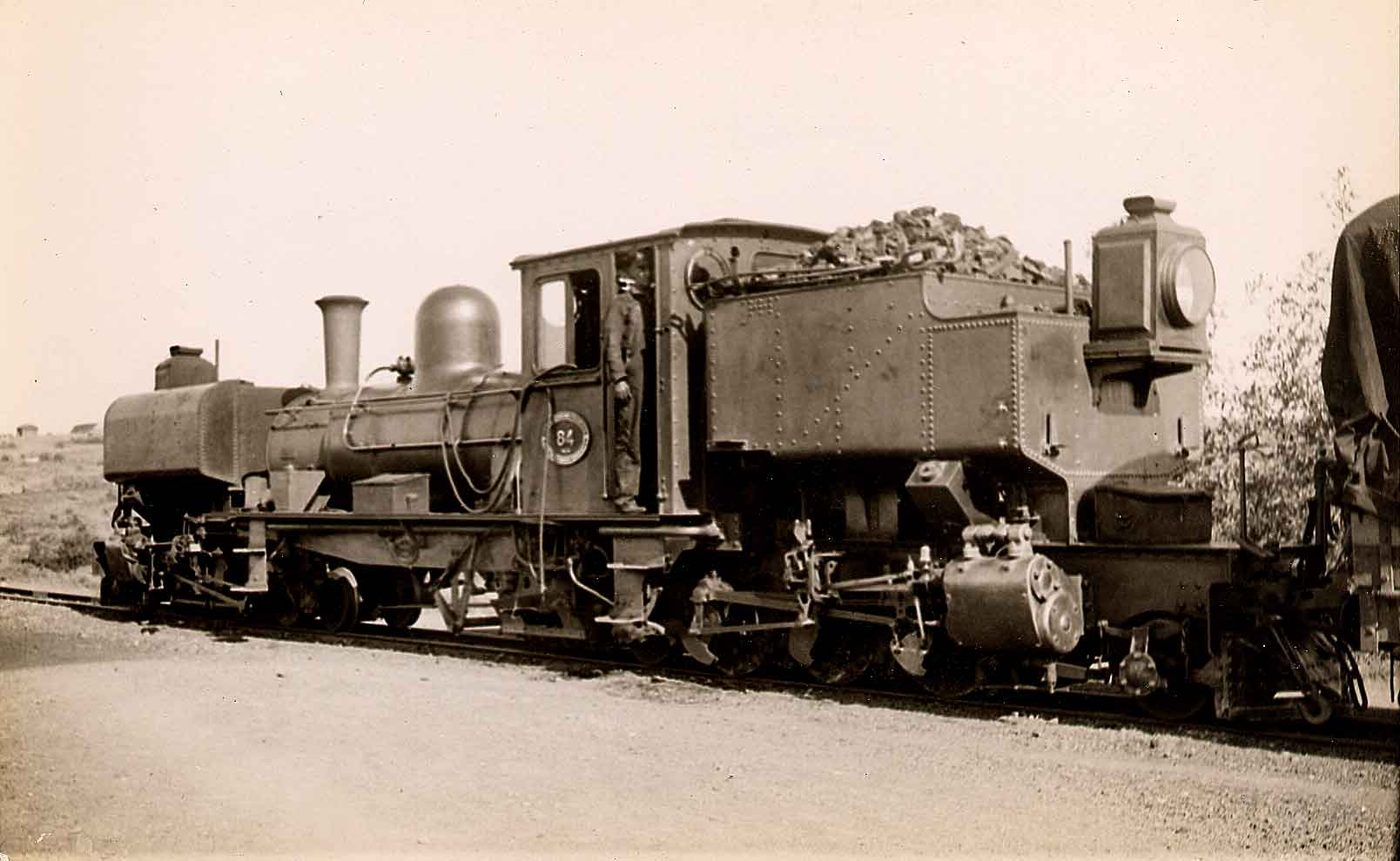
- Class NG G14 no. NG84, c. 1931
Type and origin
- Power type: Steam
- Designer: Hannoversche Maschinenbau AG
- Builder: Hannoversche Maschinenbau AG
- Serial number: 10747
- Model: Class NG G14
- Build date: 1930
- Total produced: 1
Specifications
- Configuration
  - Whyte: 2-6-2+2-6-2 (Double Prairie)
  - UIC: 1'C1'+1'C1'h4t
- Driver: 3rd & 4th coupled axles
- Gauge: 2 ft (610 mm) narrow
- Leading dia.: 21 in (533 mm)
- Coupled dia.: 30 in (762 mm)
- Trailing dia.: 21 in (533 mm)
- Wheelbase: 40 ft 6 in (12,344 mm)
  - Engine: 13 ft 3 in (4,039 mm) each
  - Coupled: 5 ft 9 in (1,753 mm) each
- Pivot centres: 21 ft (6,401 mm)
- Length
  - Over couplers: 46 ft 2 3/8 in (14,081 mm)
- Height: 10 ft (3,048 mm)
- Frame type: Plate
- Axle load: 4 LT (4,064 kg)
  - Leading: 3 LT 13 cwt 1 qtr (3,721 kg) front 3 LT 12 cwt 1 qtr (3,670 kg) rear
  - 1st coupled: 3 LT 18 cwt 3 qtr (4,001 kg)
  - 2nd coupled: 3 LT 17 cwt 3 qtr (3,950 kg)
  - 3rd coupled: 3 LT 19 cwt (4,013 kg)
  - 4th coupled: 4 LT (4,064 kg)
  - 5th coupled: 3 LT 19 cwt 2 qtr (4,039 kg)
  - 6th coupled: 3 LT 17 cwt 3 qtr (3,950 kg)
  - Trailing: 3 LT 6 cwt 2 qtr (3,378 kg) front 3 LT 10 cwt (3,556 kg) rear
- Adhesive weight: 23 LT 12 cwt 3 qtr (24,020 kg)
- Loco weight: 37 LT 14 cwt 3 qtr (38,340 kg)
- Fuel type: Coal
- Fuel capacity: 2 LT (2.0 t)
- Water cap.: 800 imp gal (3,640 L) front 200 imp gal (909 L) rear
- Firebox
  - Type: Round-top
  - Grate area: 10.5 sq ft (0.98 m^{2})
- Boiler
  - Pitch: 5 ft 3 in (1,600 mm)
  - Diameter: 3 ft 6 3/8 in (1,076 mm)
  - Tube plates: 8 ft 5 7/8 in (2,588 mm)
  - Small tubes: 73: 1 3/4 in (44 mm)
  - Large tubes: 10: 5 1/4 in (133 mm)
- Boiler pressure: 180 psi (1,241 kPa)
- Safety valve: Pop
- Heating surface
  - Firebox: 45 sq ft (4.2 m^{2})
  - Tubes: 378.5 sq ft (35.16 m^{2})
  - Total surface: 423.5 sq ft (39.34 m^{2})
- Superheater
  - Heating area: 97.5 sq ft (9.06 m^{2})
- Cylinders: Four
- Cylinder size: 9 in (229 mm) bore 16 in (406 mm) stroke
- Valve gear: Walschaerts
- Valve type: Piston
- Couplers: Bell-and-hook
Performance figures
- Tractive effort: 11,664 lbf (51.88 kN) @ 75%
Career
- Operators: South African Railways
- Class: Class NG G14
- Number in class: 1
- Numbers: NG84
- Delivered: 1931
- First run: 1931
- Withdrawn: 1952

The South African Railways Class NG G14 2-6-2+2-6-2 of 1931 was an articulated narrow gauge steam locomotive.

In 1931, the South African Railways (SAR) placed a single lightweight Class NG G14 Garratt articulated steam locomotive with a 2-6-2+2-6-2 Double Prairie type wheel arrangement in service.

== Manufacturer ==
A single narrow gauge Garratt locomotive was built for the South African Railways by Hannoversche Maschinenbau AG (Hanomag) in 1930. It was very similar to, but slightly larger and heavier than the Class NG G12 of 1927, the smallest Garratt to ever enter service on the SAR. Upon delivery, it was designated Class NG G14 and numbered NG84.

== Characteristics ==
The Class NG G14 locomotive had a 2-6-2+2-6-2 Double Prairie type wheel arrangement like all the previous and subsequent narrow gauge SAR Garratts except the first, the 2-6-0+0-6-2 Double Mogul type Class NG G11. It was very similar in dimensions to the earlier Class NG G12, but it had cylinders with a 1/2 inch (13 millimetres) larger bore which not only resulted in more power, but also an increase in axle loading. Like the Class NG G12, it also had an outside plate frame, a round-topped firebox and was superheated. Its piston valves were actuated by Walschaerts valve gear.

== Service ==
The Class NG G14 was placed in service on the narrow gauge line from Fort Beaufort to Seymour, where it became stable mate to Class NG G12 no. NG57. Its service life was similar to that of no. NG57, both being occasionally temporarily assigned to narrow gauge branch lines in other areas of the country to meet seasonal demands on those lines.

In 1940, when the Seymour branch was regauged to Cape gauge, the Class NG G14 and Class NG G12 no. NG57 were both transferred to the Kakamas branch, where they joined Class NG G12 no. NG56 working out of Upington. All three remained there until 1949, when the Kakamas line was also widened to Cape Gauge and they were transferred to South West Africa for a brief period.

From there, the Class NG G14 was allocated to Humewood Road in Port Elizabeth where it remained until it was withdrawn from service in 1952.
