= South African Class NG1 0-4-0T =

1900 narrow-gauge steam locomotive

CSAR Pankop 0-4-0T South African Class NG1 0-4-0T
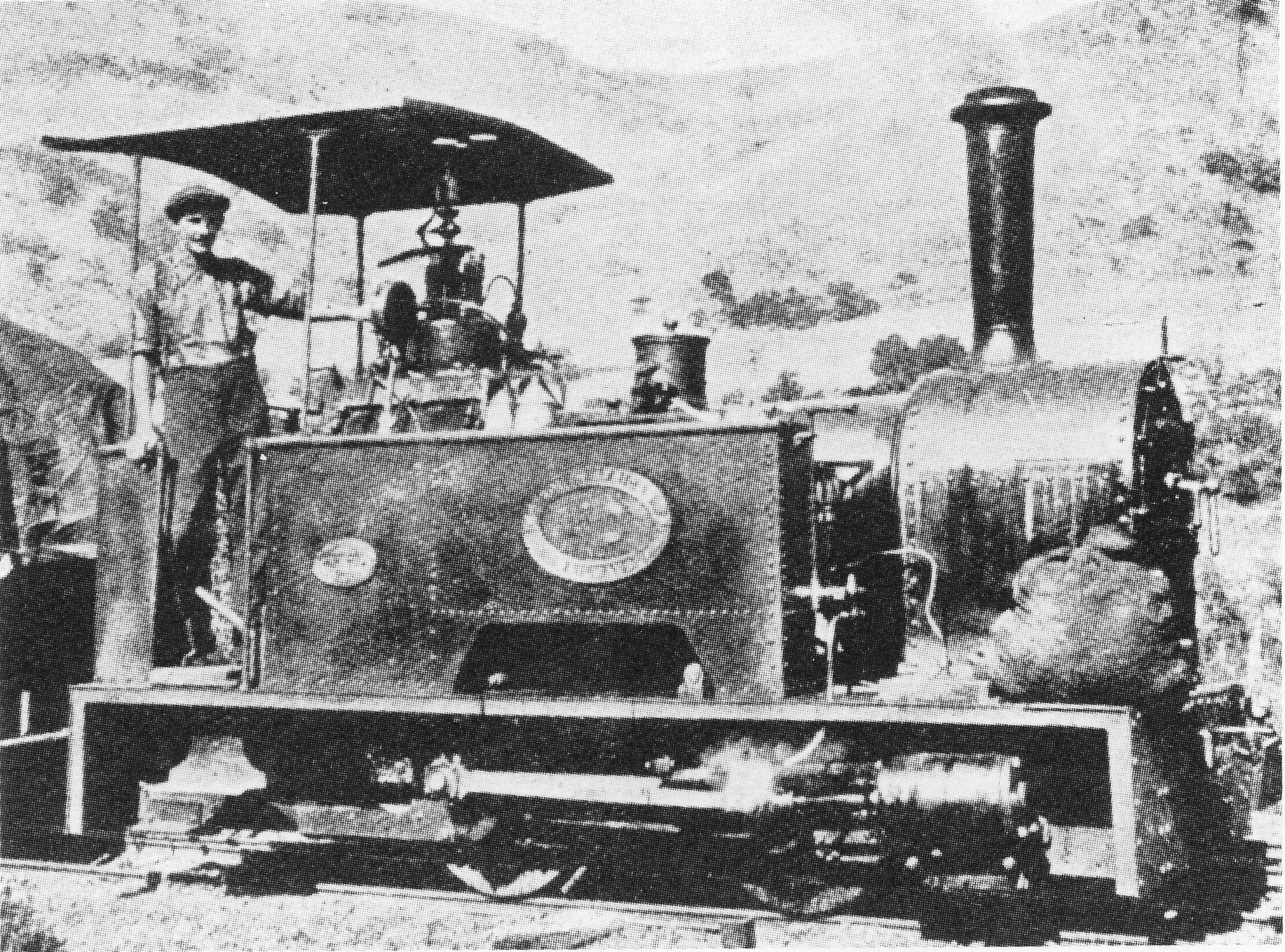
- Class NG1 no. NG40, with a sack of coal on the running board
Type and origin
- Power type: Steam
- Designer: Kerr, Stuart and Company
- Builder: Kerr, Stuart and Company
- Serial number: 676–677
- Model: S1 Sirdar
- Build date: 1899
- Total produced: 2
Specifications
- Configuration
  - Whyte: 0-4-0T
  - UIC: Bn2t
- Driver: 2nd coupled axle
- Gauge: 600 mm (1 ft 11 5/8 in) narrow
- Coupled dia.: 24 in (610 mm)
- Wheelbase: 3 ft 6 in (1,067 mm)
- Length
  - Over couplers: 13 ft 6 in (4,115 mm)
- Height: 8 ft 9 in (2,667 mm)
- Frame type: Plate
- Axle load: 3 LT 2 cwt 2 qtr (3,175 kg) av.
  - Coupled: 3 LT 2 cwt 2 qtr (3,175 kg) each
- Adhesive weight: 6 LT 5 cwt (6,350 kg)
- Loco weight: 6 LT 5 cwt (6,350 kg)
- Fuel type: Coal
- Fuel capacity: 5 long hundredweight (0.3 t)
- Water cap.: 90 imp gal (409 L)
- Firebox
  - Type: Round-top
  - Grate area: 3.3 sq ft (0.31 m^{2})
- Boiler
  - Pitch: 4 ft 4 3/4 in (1,340 mm)
  - Diameter: 2 ft (610 mm)
  - Tube plates: 5 ft 1 1/2 in (1,562 mm)
- Boiler pressure: 140 psi (965 kPa)
- Safety valve: Ramsbottom
- Heating surface
  - Firebox: 16.5 sq ft (1.53 m^{2})
  - Tubes: 83.5 sq ft (7.76 m^{2})
  - Total surface: 100 sq ft (9.3 m^{2})
- Cylinders: Two
- Cylinder size: 6 in (152 mm) bore 10 in (254 mm) stroke
- Valve gear: Stephenson
- Valve type: Murdoch's D slide
- Couplers: Buffers-and-chain
Performance figures
- Tractive effort: 1,575 lbf (7.01 kN) @ 75%
Career
- Operators: British War Office; Central South African Railways; South African Railways
- Class: SAR Class NG1
- Number in class: 2
- Numbers: CSAR 676-677, SAR NG40-NG41
- Nicknames: Pankop
- Delivered: 1900
- First run: 1900
- Withdrawn: 1931

The South African Railways Class NG1 0-4-0T of 1900 was a narrow-gauge steam locomotive from the pre-Union era in Transvaal.

In 1900, the British War Office placed two Sirdar class 0-4-0T narrow-gauge steam locomotives in service near Germiston. At the end of the Second Boer War, the locomotives were sold to a farmer who used them on a firewood line out of Pienaarsrivier, until the line and locomotives were taken over by the Central South African Railways.

In 1912, when these locomotives were assimilated into the South African Railways, they were renumbered with an "NG" prefix to their numbers. When a system of grouping narrow-gauge locomotives into classes was eventually introduced somewhere between 1928 and 1930, they were designated Class NG1.

== Manufacturer ==
Three Sirdar class 0-4-0T narrow-gauge steam locomotives were built for Allan Alderson and Company of Cairo, for use during the Nile Barrage construction in Egypt. In November 1899, the Director of Army Contracts of the British War Office ordered two narrow-gauge steam locomotives from Kerr, Stuart and Company for delivery within ten days, since the locomotives were urgently needed by the Royal Engineers for use in a siege park in the Zuid-Afrikaansche Republiek where the Second Boer War was in progress. A siege park was a depot for holding engineer's stores which could be required during a siege.

By diverting two of the three locomotives which were ready to be shipped out to the Nile Barrage construction works in Egypt, the locomotive builders were actually able to supply the engines within four days. The standard Sirdar class engines were similar to the single 2 ft 6 in (762 mm) gauge 2-4-2 tank engine Hope which had entered service in Walvis Bay in 1899, but without the leading and trailing pony wheels. Kerr, Stuart was a supplier of contractor's engines and often built locomotives to standard designs, but without frame stretchers and axles, and kept them in stock until an order was placed. This allowed them to be delivered with a minimum of delay.

== The 600 and 610 millimetre gauges ==
The locomotives had plate frames and used Stephenson valve gear. Although they were eventually classified as 2 ft (610 mm) narrow-gauge locomotives along with the rest of the South African narrow-gauge locomotive fleet, they were actually constructed to the metric 600 mm (1 ft 11 5/8 in) gauge.

Historically, the actual two feet narrow-gauge rail spacing depended on whether or not the track was laid by a metricised country. German-built narrow-gauge lines in Deutsch-Südwest-Afrika (DSWA) were therefore 600 mm (1 ft 11 5/8 in) gauge, while those in South Africa, built to Imperial standards, were 2 ft (610 mm) gauge.

In practice, however, the two gauges are still treated as one and the same by, for example, the British Military. The same applied in the Zuid-Afrikaansche Republiek, which was being invaded by the British Army at the time. The 10 millimetres (0.39 inches) difference was considered as insignificant and, in subsequent years, narrow-gauge locomotives regularly migrated between the narrow-gauge lines laid to German standards in South West Africa (SWA) and those laid to Imperial standards in South Africa.

== Service ==
=== Royal Engineers ===
During 1900, these two locomotives were used by the 47th Field Company Royal Engineers during the construction of the Bezuidenhout Light Railway, a light narrow-gauge railway line from Simmer and Jack's siding near Germiston to a siege camp, 3.5 kilometres (2.2 miles) away along the Bezuidenhout Valley.

=== Pankop firewood line ===
After the end of the war in 1902, the two locomotives and rolling stock were sold to a farmer as army surplus stock. He used it to haul firewood on a 15-kilometre-long (9-mile) railway which he constructed from Pienaarsrivier on the mainline between Pretoria and Pietersburg, to Pankop on the Springbokvlakte.

=== Central South African Railways ===
The Pankop railway and rolling stock were taken over by the Central South African Railways (CSAR) in 1905. The CSAR extended the line to Settlers and opened the 26 miles 60 chains (43 kilometres) line to traffic on 21 June 1906. The intention was, on the one hand, to serve the immigrant farming community around Settlers and, on the other hand, to determine exactly how much a light railway of this nature could achieve in districts where the traffic would be light at the outset. In CSAR service, the locomotives became known as the Pankop engines and were referred to by their builder's works numbers 676 and 677. They were often coupled back-to-back to cope with heavier loads.

=== South African Railways ===
When the Union of South Africa was established on 31 May 1910, the three Colonial government railways (Cape Government Railways, Natal Government Railways and CSAR) were united under a single administration to control and administer the railways, ports and harbours of the Union. Although the South African Railways and Harbours came into existence in 1910, the actual classification and renumbering of all the rolling stock of the three constituent railways were only implemented with effect from 1 January 1912.

Narrow-gauge locomotives were included in the SAR's narrow-gauge numbering scheme in 1912 and were allocated engine numbers with an "NG" prefix. A system of grouping narrow-gauge locomotives into classes was only adopted at some time between 1928 and 1930 and, at that point, the two Sirdar locomotives were classified as Class NG1.

When the Settlers branchline was converted to Cape gauge in 1923, the locomotives were transferred to work on the line which was under construction between Elandshoek and Mount Carmel. When this line was closed in 1931, the Class NG1 locomotives were withdrawn from service.
