= South African Class NG3 4-6-2T =

1907 narrow-gauge steam locomotive

NGR Class N 4-6-2T 1907 South African Class NG3 4-6-2T
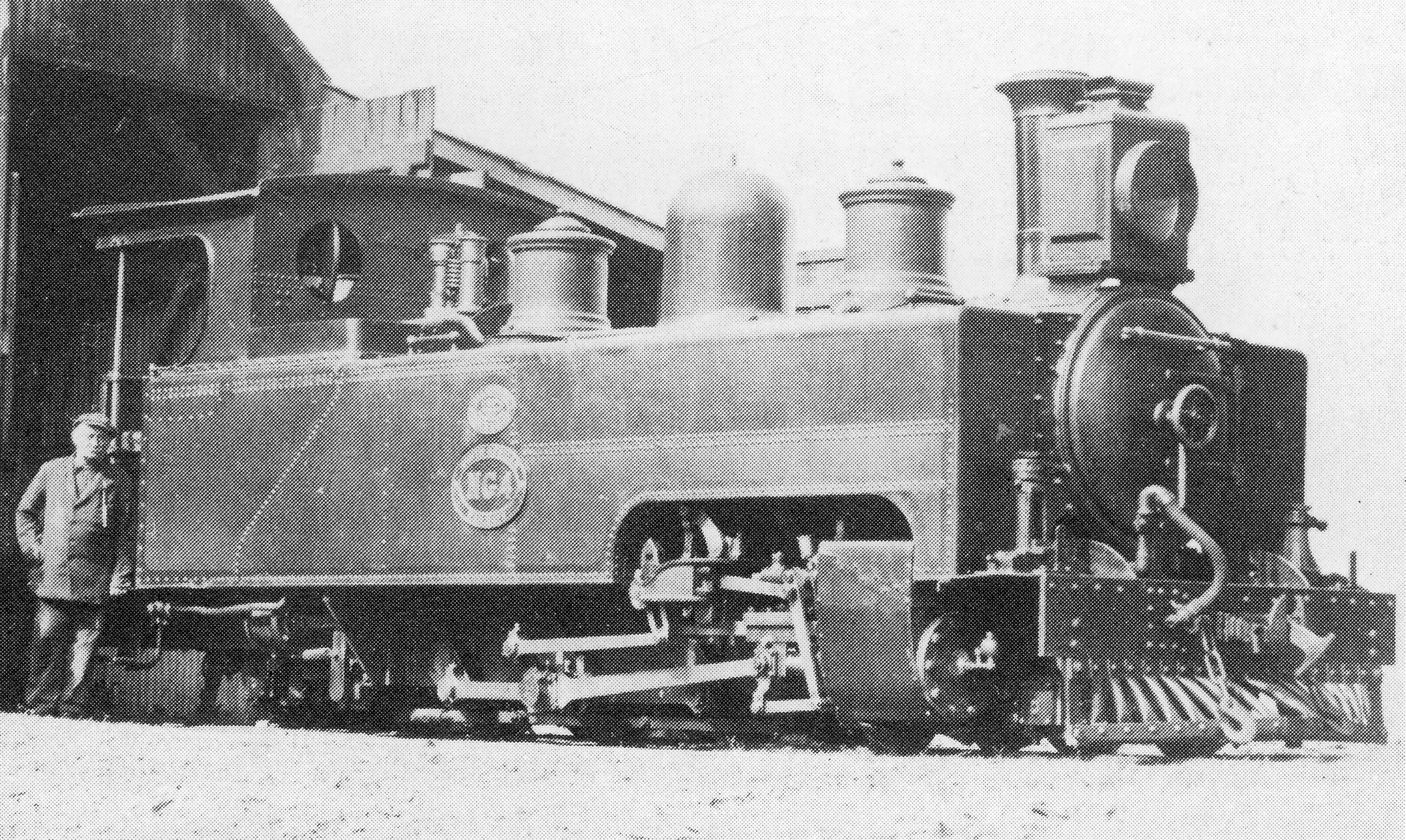
- NGR Hawthorn Leslie no. 4 SAR Class NG3 no. NG4
Type and origin
- Power type: Steam
- Designer: Natal Government Railways (D.A. Hendrie)
- Builder: Hawthorn Leslie and Company
- Serial number: 2687–2692
- Build date: 1907
- Total produced: 6
Specifications
- Configuration
  - Whyte: 4-6-2T
  - UIC: 2'C1'n2t
- Driver: 2nd coupled axle
- Gauge: 2 ft (610 mm) narrow
- Leading dia.: 18 in (457 mm)
- Coupled dia.: 30 in (762 mm)
- Trailing dia.: 21 in (533 mm)
- Wheelbase: 17 ft 9 in (5,410 mm)
  - Leading: 3 ft 6 in (1,067 mm)
  - Coupled: 5 ft 9 in (1,753 mm)
- Length
  - Over couplers: 24 ft 11 in (7,595 mm)
- Height: 9 ft 4 1/2 in (2,858 mm)
- Frame type: Plate
- Axle load: 5 LT 16 cwt (5,893 kg)
  - Leading: 3 LT 14 cwt (3,759 kg)
  - 1st coupled: 5 LT 16 cwt (5,893 kg)
  - 2nd coupled: 5 LT 16 cwt (5,893 kg)
  - 3rd coupled: 5 LT 15 cwt (5,842 kg)
  - Trailing: 4 LT 8 cwt (4,471 kg)
- Adhesive weight: 17 LT 7 cwt (17,630 kg)
- Loco weight: 25 LT 9 cwt (25,860 kg)
- Fuel type: Coal
- Fuel capacity: 21 long hundredweight (1.1 t)
- Water cap.: 784 imp gal (3,560 L)
- Firebox
  - Type: Round-top
  - Grate area: 11 sq ft (1.0 m^{2})
- Boiler
  - Pitch: 4 ft 6 in (1,372 mm)
  - Diameter: 3 ft 3 1/2 in (1,003 mm)
  - Tube plates: 11 ft 2 1/8 in (3,407 mm)
  - Small tubes: 124: 1 3/4 in (44 mm)
- Boiler pressure: 165 psi (1,138 kPa)
- Safety valve: Ramsbottom
- Heating surface
  - Firebox: 41 sq ft (3.8 m^{2})
  - Tubes: 634.9 sq ft (58.98 m^{2})
  - Total surface: 675.9 sq ft (62.79 m^{2})
- Cylinders: Two
- Cylinder size: 11 1/2 in (292 mm) bore 15 in (381 mm) stroke
- Valve gear: Walschaerts
- Couplers: Johnston link-and-pin (Natal); Bell-and-hook (Cape)
Performance figures
- Tractive effort: 8,183 lbf (36.40 kN) @ 75%
Career
- Operators: Natal Government Railways; South African Railways
- Class: NGR Class N, SAR Class NG3
- Number in class: 6
- Numbers: NGR 4–9, SAR NG4-NG9
- Delivered: 1907
- First run: 1907
- Withdrawn: 1946

The South African Railways Class NG3 4-6-2T of 1907 was a narrow-gauge steam locomotive from the pre-Union era in the Colony of Natal.

In 1907, the Natal Government Railways placed six 4-6-2T Pacific type narrow-gauge steam locomotives in service. In 1912, when these locomotives were assimilated into the South African Railways, they retained their engine numbers, but with an "NG" prefix added. When a system of grouping narrow-gauge locomotives into classes was eventually introduced somewhere between 1928 and 1930, they were designated Class NG3.

== Natal's narrow gauge ==
By 1906, the Natal Government realised that light railways were essential as feeders to open up fertile districts which were distant from the existing main- and branch lines, particularly when the intervening stretches of country were difficult from an engineering point of view. The second narrow-gauge railway in Natal was constructed from Esperanza at Umzinto on the South Coast via Ixopo to Donnybrook.

The residents of Alexandra County and the Ixopo Division had been pressing for a railway for years. These counties were only tapped by the Railways at their extreme edges. The eastern edge of Alexandra County was served by the South Coast line, which had reached Umzinto in 1900, while the extreme western border of the Ixopo Division was served by the Underberg and Kokstad lines which had reached Donnybrook in 1905. Communication was difficult between these two lines, being 100 miles (160 kilometres) apart, with the upper end of the district at 4,700 feet (1,400 metres) above sea level. Since the cost of building a Cape gauge line across this terrain was considered prohibitive, the farmers accepted the 2 ft (610 mm) narrow-gauge railway which was offered.

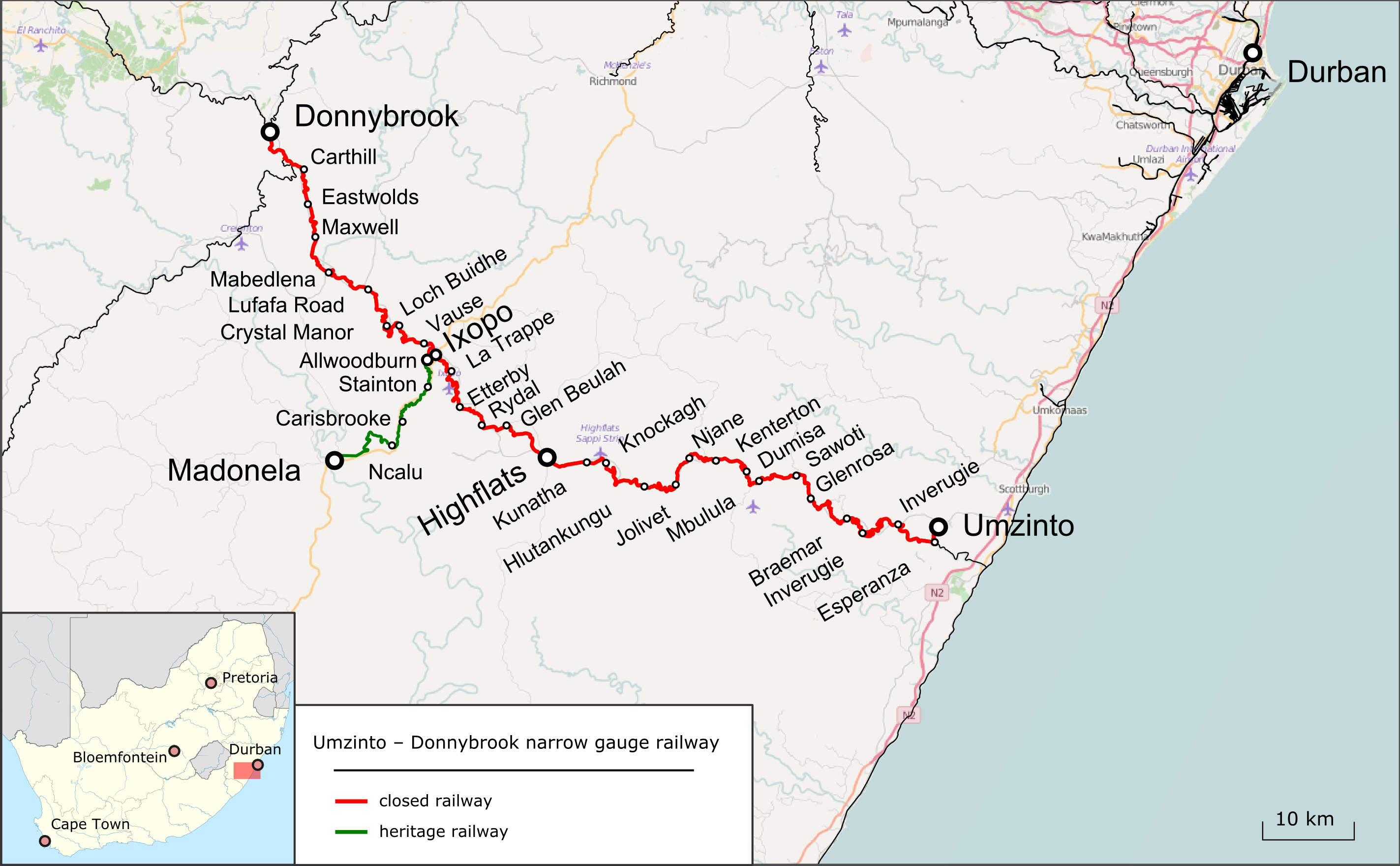
Umzinto-Donnybrook railway

The line was officially opened to traffic on 3 June 1908 by the Governor of Natal, Sir Matthew Nathan. It was 158 kilometres (98 miles) long from Esperanza where it met the South Coast line at Umzinto, to Donnybrook where it met the Underberg branch. A 28-kilometre-long (17-mile) branchline from Ixopo to Madonela was added and completed on 2 February 1914.

== Manufacturer ==
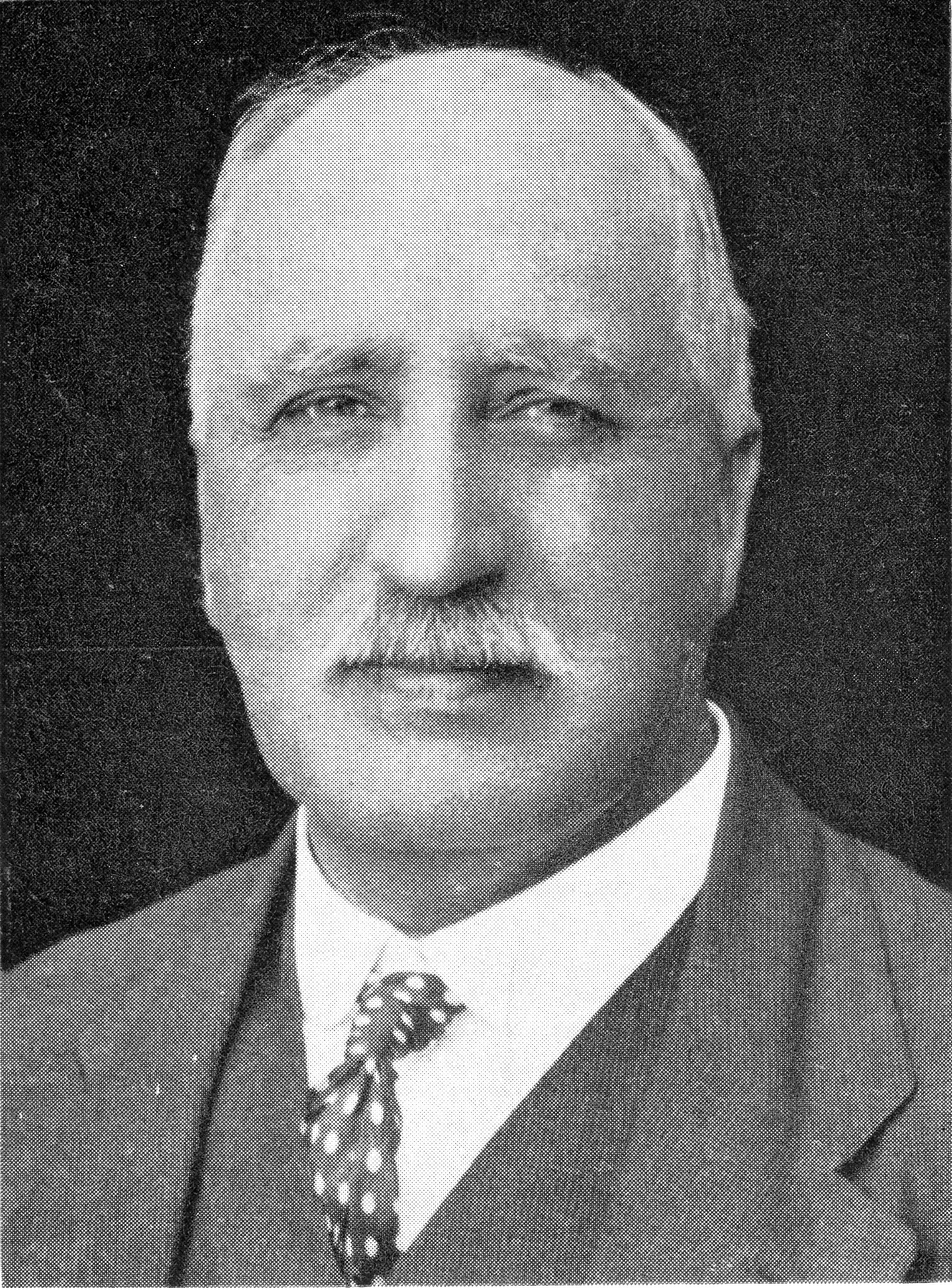
D.A. Hendrie

Commonly known as the Hawthorn Leslie Side Tanks, the second batch of narrow-gauge 4-6-2T locomotives of the Natal Government Railways (NGR) were built to the design of NGR Locomotive Superintendent D.A. Hendrie, based on his earlier design of the Hunslet 4-6-2T locomotives of 1906. An order for six of these locomotives was placed with Hawthorn Leslie and Company.

The locomotives were similar in appearance to the earlier Hunslet Side Tank, but with larger water tanks and more ornate boiler-mounted sandboxes. They also had round-top fireboxes, outside plate frames and used Walschaerts valve gear.

== Service ==
=== Natal Government Railways ===
The Hawthorn Leslie Side Tanks were acquired specifically to work the Donnybrook-Esperanza railway. When they were delivered in 1907 in anticipation of the opening of the Donnybrook line the following year, they became part of the Class N on the NGR and were numbered in the range from 4 to 9.

=== South African Railways ===
When the Union of South Africa was established on 31 May 1910, the three Colonial government railways (Cape Government Railways, NGR and Central South African Railways) were united under a single administration to control and administer the railways, ports and harbours of the Union. Although the South African Railways and Harbours came into existence in 1910, the actual classification and renumbering of all the rolling stock of the three constituent railways were only implemented with effect from 1 January 1912.

In 1912, the NGR narrow-gauge locomotives were included in the SAR's narrow-gauge numbering scheme, but were not classified or renumbered and merely had an "NG" prefix, for narrow gauge, added to their existing engine numbers.

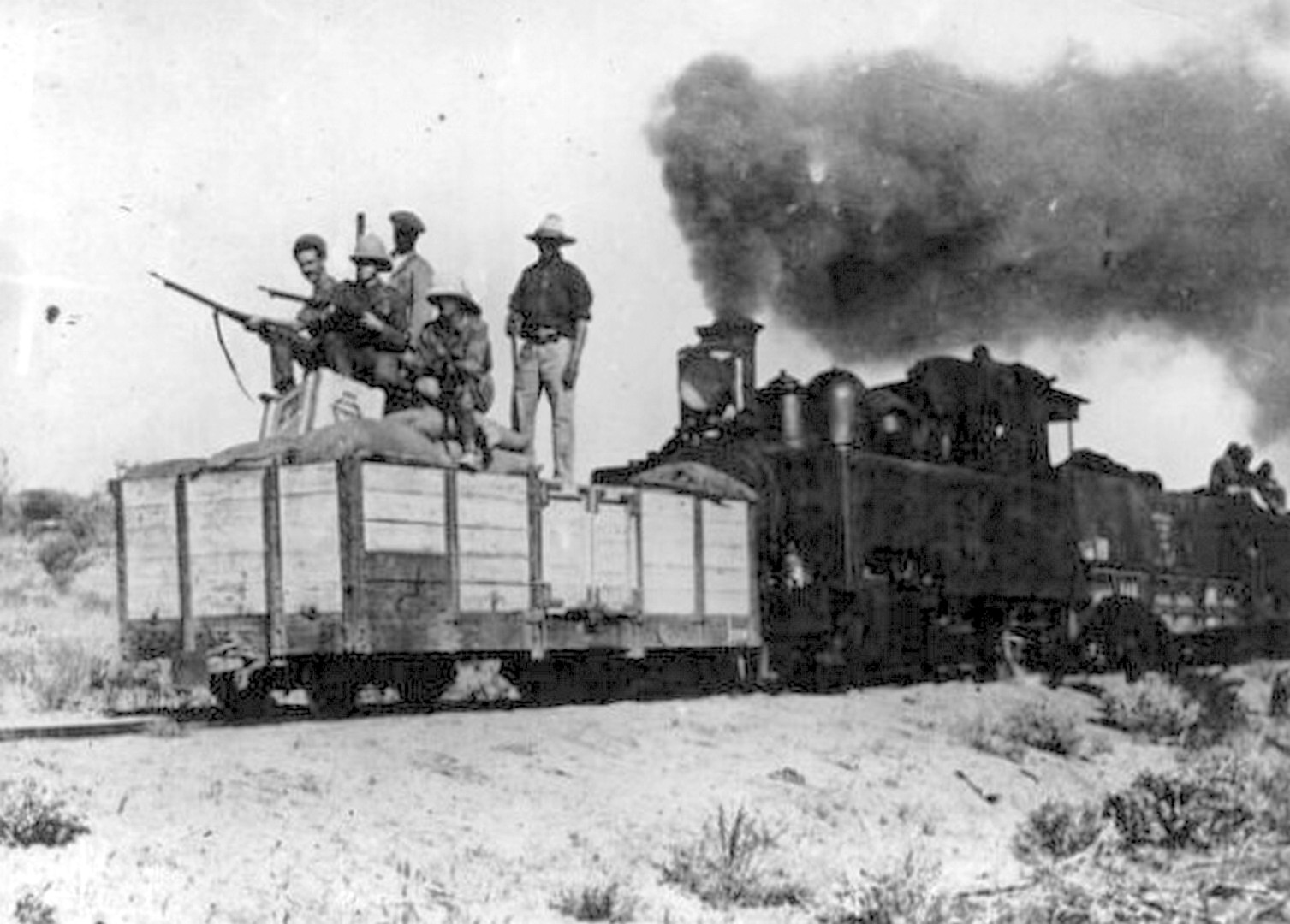
Class NG3 locomotive at work in German South West Africa, c. 1917

In 1915, shortly after the outbreak of the First World War, the German South West Africa colony was occupied by the Union Defence Forces. Since a large part of the territory's railway infrastructure was destroyed or damaged by retreating German forces, an urgent need arose for locomotives for use on the narrow-gauge lines in that territory. In 1917, three of these locomotives, numbers NG4, NG6 and NG9, were transferred to the Defence Department for service in South West Africa. Numbers NG4 and NG9, and possibly all three locomotives, returned to South Africa after the war.

A system of grouping narrow-gauge locomotives into classes was only adopted by the SAR in the late 1920s. At that point, the four remaining Hawthorn Leslie Side Tanks, numbers NG4, NG5, NG8 and NG9, were designated Class NG3 on the SAR.

In SAR service in South Africa, the Class NG3 remained mainly confined to the Natal narrow-gauge branches. One exception was no. NG5, which was transferred to the Avontuur branch in the Eastern Cape in 1939 to replace Class NG9 no. NG45, which was in turn transferred to the Upington-Kakamas branch to join her two sister engines, numbers NG44 and NG46. In Port Elizabeth, no. NG5 was employed on yard duties in and around Humewood Road, where it eventually became the last survivor of the Class NG3. It remained in service until it was sold out of service in 1946.
