= South African Class NG G11 2-6-0+0-6-2 =

1919 design of steam locomotive

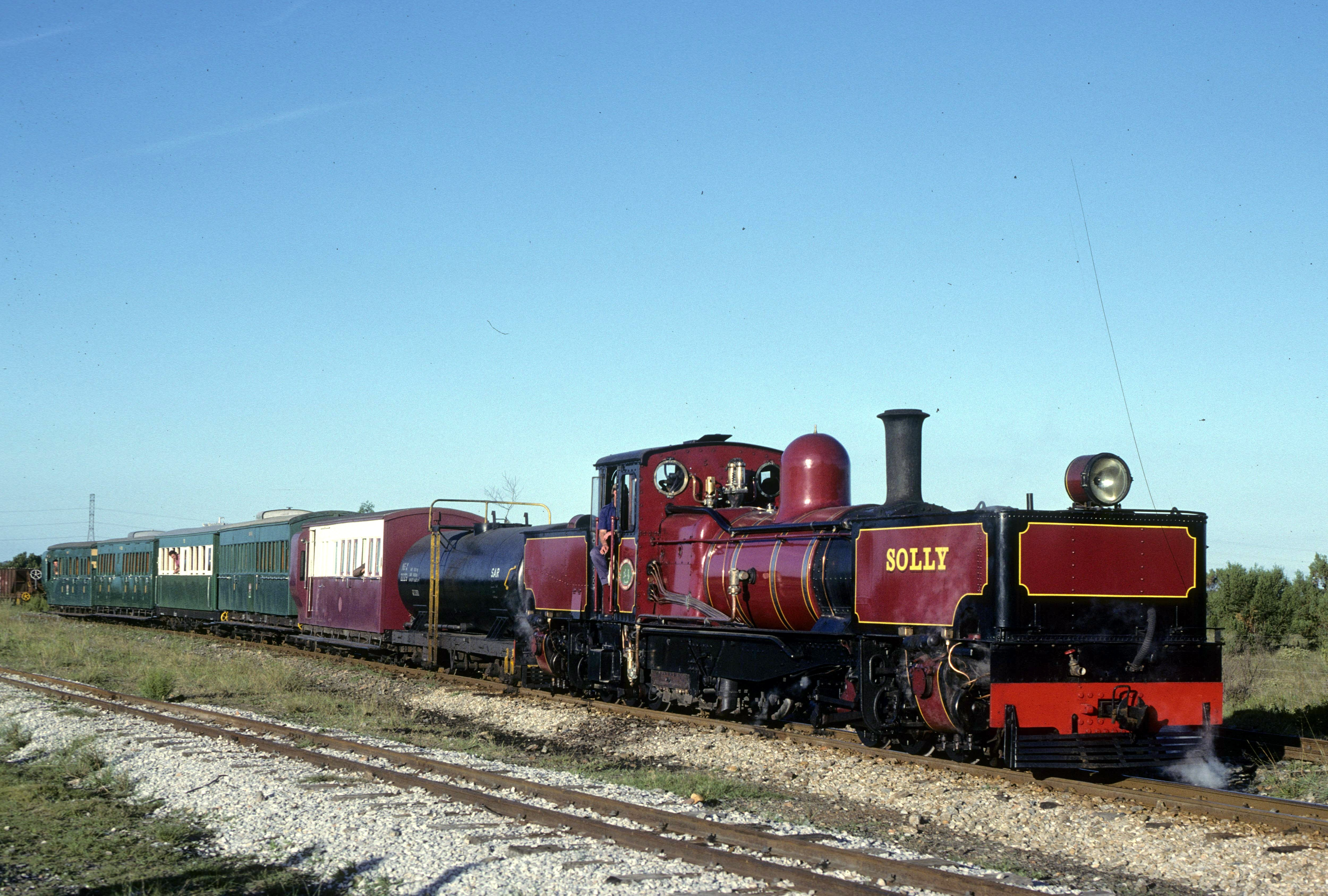
- NG G11 no. 54 Solly at Chelsea on 3 April 1990
Type and origin
- ♠ Saturated steam locomotives ♥ Superheated steam locomotives
- Power type: Steam
- Designer: Beyer, Peacock & Company
- Builder: Beyer, Peacock & Company
- Serial number: 5975–5977, 6199, 6200
- Model: Class NG G11
- Build date: 1919–1925
- Total produced: 5
Specifications
- Configuration
  - Whyte: 2-6-0+0-6-2 (Double Mogul)
  - UIC: ♠ 1'C+C1'n4 – ♥ 1'C+C1'h4
- Driver: 3rd & 4th coupled axles
- Gauge: 2 ft narrow gauge
- Leading dia.: 21 in (533 mm)
- Coupled dia.: 30 in (762 mm)
- Wheelbase: ♠ 39 ft (11,887 mm) ♥ 39 ft 9 in (12,116 mm)
  - Engine: 10 ft 3 in (3,124 mm) each
  - Coupled: 5 ft 9 in (1,753 mm) each
- Pivot centres: ♠ 22 ft (6,706 mm) ♥ 22 ft 9 in (6,934 mm)
- Length
  - Over couplers: ♠ 44 ft 7 1/2 in (13,602 mm) ♥ 45 ft 5 in (13,843 mm)
- Height: 10 ft 4 in (3,150 mm)
- Frame type: Plate
- Axle load: ♠ 6 LT 3 cwt 3 qtr (6,287 kg) ♥ 6 LT 11 cwt (6,655 kg)
  - Leading: ♠ 4 LT 7 cwt 1 qtr (4,433 kg) front 4 LT 5 cwt (4,318 kg) rear ♥ 4 LT 16 cwt (4,877 kg) front 4 LT 15 cwt 3 qtr (4,864 kg) rear
  - 1st coupled: ♠ 6 LT (6,096 kg) ♥ 6 LT 9 cwt 2 qtr (6,579 kg)
  - 2nd coupled: ♠ 6 LT 1 cwt 2 qtr (6,172 kg) ♥ 6 LT 8 cwt 2 qtr (6,528 kg)
  - 3rd coupled: ♠ 5 LT 17 cwt (5,944 kg) ♥ 6 LT 4 cwt 3 qtr (6,338 kg)
  - 4th coupled: ♠ 6 LT 0 cwt 2 qtr (6,122 kg) ♥ 6 LT 8 cwt 2 qtr (6,528 kg)
  - 5th coupled: ♠ 6 LT 3 cwt 3 qtr (6,287 kg) ♥ 6 LT 11 cwt (6,655 kg)
  - 6th coupled: ♠ 6 LT (6,096 kg) ♥ 6 LT 10 cwt 3 qtr (6,642 kg)
- Adhesive weight: ♠ 36 LT 2 cwt 3 qtr (36,720 kg) ♥ 39 LT 3 cwt (39,780 kg)
- Loco weight: ♠ 44 LT 15 cwt (45,470 kg) ♥ 48 LT 4 cwt 3 qtr (49,010 kg)
- Fuel type: Coal
- Fuel capacity: 2 LT 10 cwt (2.5 t)
- Water cap.: 970 imp gal (4,410 L) front 380 imp gal (1,730 L) rear
- Firebox
  - Type: Belpaire
  - Grate area: ♠ 19.3 sq ft (1.79 m^{2}) ♥ 19.5 sq ft (1.81 m^{2})
- Boiler
  - Pitch: 5 ft 3 in (1,600 mm)
  - Diameter: 4 ft 2 in (1,270 mm)
  - Tube plates: 9 ft 3 3/8 in (2,829 mm)
  - Small tubes: ♠ 211: 1 3/4 in (44 mm) ♥ 115: 1 3/4 in (44 mm)
  - Large tubes: ♥ 13: 5 1/2 in (140 mm)
- Boiler pressure: 180 psi (1,241 kPa)
- Safety valve: Ramsbottom
- Heating surface
  - Firebox: ♠ 81 sq ft (7.5 m^{2}) ♥ 80.6 sq ft (7.49 m^{2})
  - Tubes: ♠ 899 sq ft (83.5 m^{2}) ♥ 660.9 sq ft (61.40 m^{2})
  - Total surface: ♠ 980 sq ft (91 m^{2}) ♥ 741.5 sq ft (68.89 m^{2})
- Superheater
  - Heating area: ♥ 141.5 sq ft (13.15 m^{2})
- Cylinders: Four
- Cylinder size: 10 1/2 in (267 mm) bore 16 in (406 mm) stroke
- Valve gear: Walschaerts
- Valve type: ♠ Slide – ♥ Piston
- Couplers: Bell-and-hook (Cape); Johnston link-and-pin (Natal)
Performance figures
- Tractive effort: ♠♥ 15,876 lbf (70.62 kN) @ 75%
Career
- Operators: South African Railways
- Class: Class NG G11
- Number in class: 5
- Numbers: ♠ NG51-NG53 – ♥ NG54-NG55
- Delivered: 1919–1925
- First run: 1919
- Withdrawn: 1962–1974
- Preserved: 3

The South African Railways Class NG G11 2-6-0+0-6-2 of 1919 is a class of narrow gauge steam locomotives.

Between 1919 and 1925, the South African Railways (SAR) placed five Class NG G11 Garratt locomotives with a 2-6-0+0-6-2 Double Mogul type wheel arrangement in service on the Avontuur narrow gauge line through the Langkloof, and also in Natal. They were the first Garratt locomotives to enter service in South Africa.

== Background ==
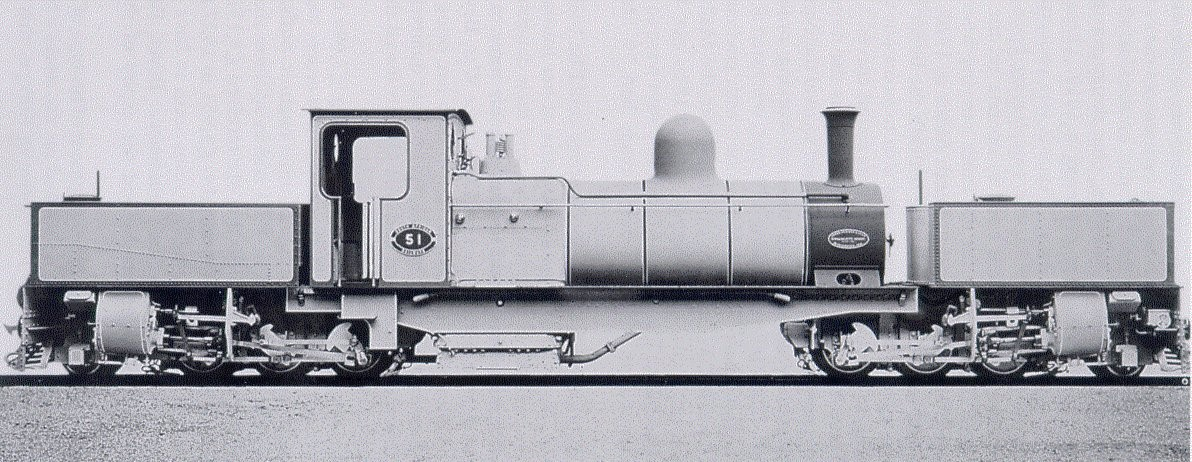
Beyer, Peacock & Company works picture of no. NG51, c. 1919

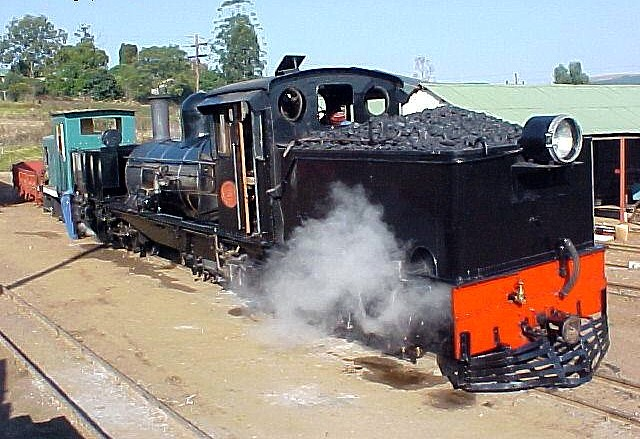
NG G11 no. NG55 at Ixopo, KwaZulu-Natal, June 2005

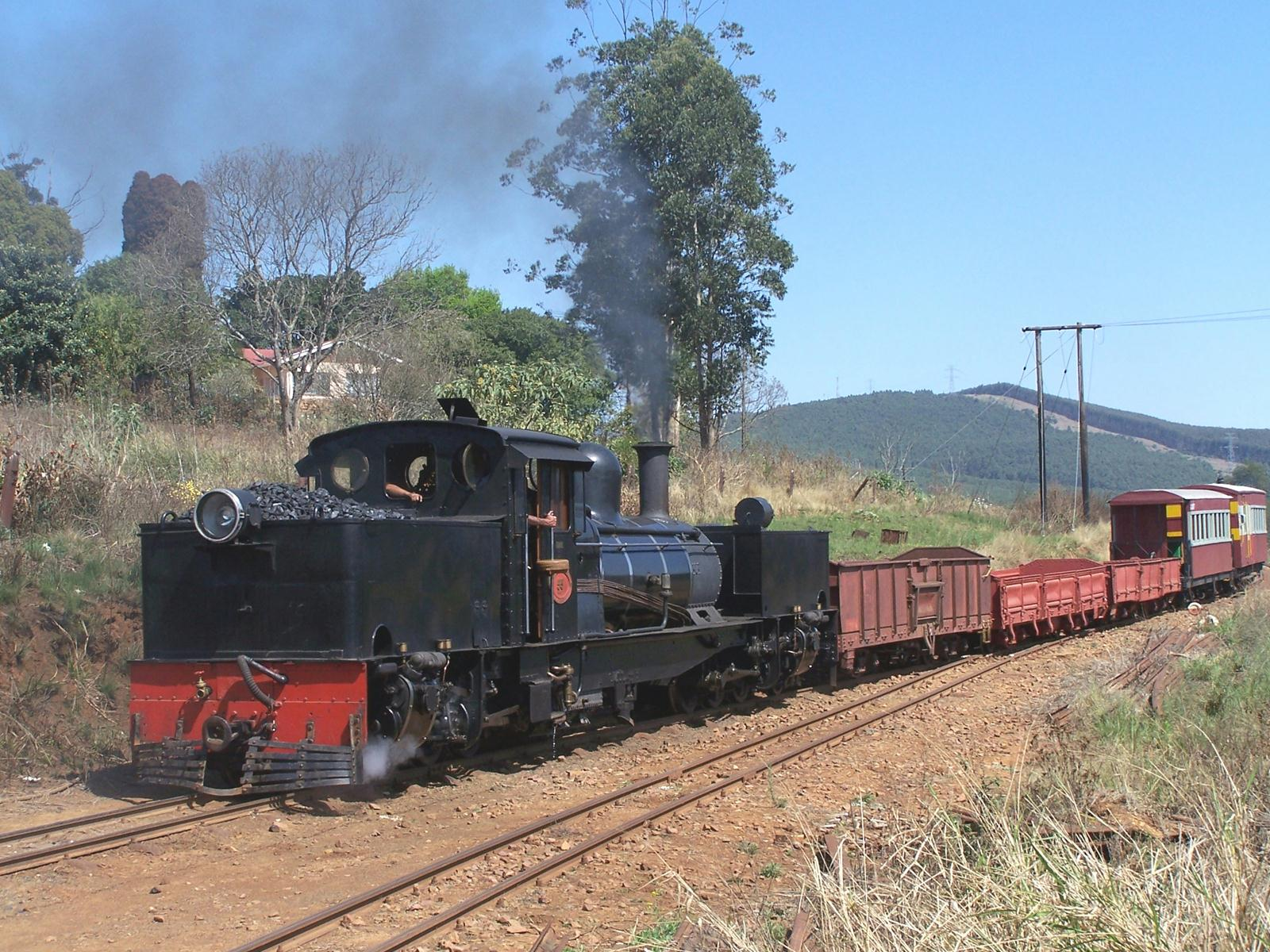
NG G11 no. NG55 entering Ixopo station, September 2005

The challenges of Africa resulted in the regular need for double-heading of steam locomotives on heavy trains. While West Africa found its solution in larger 4-6-2 Pacific and 2-8-2 Mikado locomotives at the beginning of the twentieth century, the steeper gradients and tighter curves in South Africa made a different solution necessary.

On the South African Railways (SAR) narrow gauge lines, that solution was found in 1914 when orders were placed with Beyer, Peacock & Company for a narrow-gauge Garratt locomotive. It was to become the first Garratt to enter SAR service.

== Garratt characteristics ==
A powerful steam locomotive is problematic on a track gauge of only 2 ft (610 mm) with a tight minimum radius of about 150 feet (46 metres) which, in practice, restricts powerful rigid-frame locomotives to four-coupled wheels, often with at least one flangeless coupled wheelset.

The same problem also existed on Cape gauge light-rail single-line track where train lengths would be limited because conventional locomotives had been enlarged to the limit of their possible power due to restrictions on axle loading. Alternative solutions would either be double-heading longer trains or re-building and re-aligning large parts of the lines to accommodate heavier locomotives. Either method was expensive and, in such conditions, the Garratt design had distinct advantages.

On a Garratt locomotive, the shared boiler and cab are carried on a cradle frame which is suspended on pivot centres attached to the frames of the two engine units, which are both free to align itself to the track curvature. To accommodate the pivoting, the steam and exhaust pipes have flexible connections between the engine units and the central cradle.

=== Garratt advantages ===
A Garratt is actually two separate locomotives combined in a double articulated format, thereby providing multiple powered axles over which the total locomotive weight is spread. This, in turn, results in a more powerful locomotive, since a much larger percentage of the locomotive's total mass contributes to traction compared to a tender locomotive of similar total mass. The use of a Garratt locomotive enables the capacity of a line to be approximately doubled without having to strengthen the track, bridges and culverts, or re-align the curvature.

Unlike tender locomotives, Garratts are bi-directional, which eliminates the need for turntables or triangles, also known as wyes. The fact that they did not need to be run through to terminals to be turned around also made increased operational flexibility possible.

Probably the greatest advantage of the Garratt was that, with its boiler and grate area suspended between two engine units without the need to leave room for coupled wheels and cylinders, wide and deep fireboxes with large grate areas and large diameter boilers were possible. On a Garratt, the boiler could literally be dimensioned up to the full cross section of the loading gauge. With each set of cylinders and coupled wheels constituting a separate engine, the result was two locomotives in one, with one huge shared boiler which needed only one crew. A Garratt is therefore a single locomotive with double the tractive effort and, with its weight distributed over a long and flexible multi-axle wheelbase, a lower axle loading.

=== Garratt drawbacks ===
The Garratt design has some inherent drawbacks, however, the first being a diminishing factor of adhesion over long distances. As water and coal is consumed, the weight over the coupled wheels is reduced, thereby reducing their factor of adhesion, the ratio of weight on coupled wheels to tractive effort. Therefore, as the weight on the coupled wheels decreases, the locomotive has less adhesion and becomes increasingly prone to slipping.

Another drawback is the risk of tilting. These narrow gauge Garratts had boilers of 4 feet 2 inches (1,270 millimetres) inside diameter on a frame width of about 6 feet 10 1/2 inches (2,096 millimetres). This created the risk of the locomotive tilting over on tight curves.

== Manufacturer ==
Although they had already been ordered in 1914, production was disrupted by World War I. Beyer, Peacock & Company was only able to deliver the first three locomotives in 1919 after cessation of hostilities. All three, numbered in the range from NG51 to NG53, were erected at the Uitenhage workshops and no. NG51 was put on trials on the Avontuur line in May 1920. It initially remained there after the trials, while the other two went to the Stuartstown line in Natal, to be joined there by no. NG51 later. These three locomotives were not superheated. They had outside plate frames, Walschaerts valve gear, Belpaire fireboxes and used saturated steam and slide valves.

Having been proved successful during trials, another two locomotives were ordered from Beyer, Peacock. Numbers NG54 and NG55 were delivered in 1925 and erected at the Durban workshops in April of that year. Both entered service in Natal. These two were superheated and, as a result, had longer smokeboxes and were 9 1/2 inches (241 millimetres) longer in overall length. Superheating also required alteration of the valve gear and piston valves were therefore used instead of slide valves. The cabs of the second order locomotives were also improved to offer better protection to the crew.

== Classification ==
The system of grouping narrow-gauge locomotives into classes was only adopted by the SAR somewhere between 1928 and 1930. At that point, in spite of the difference between the two batches of 1919 and 1925, these five locomotives were all classified as Class NG G11, with the letters "NG" indicating narrow gauge and the "G" prefix to the classification number identifying it as a Garratt locomotive.

== Service ==
The first three locomotives were all working in Natal soon after entering service. All but one remained there for the rest of their service lives until withdrawal by 1962. No. NG51 was later returned to the Avontuur line to replace the retiring Class NG3 no. NG5 as yard shunter at Humewood Road.

After completion of the Otavi Railway's gauge widening by April 1961, a flood of Class NG15 locomotives from South West Africa swamped the Humewood Road depot in Port Elizabeth. From a total of 23 engines in March 1961, of which four were sub-shedded at Loerie, the number almost doubled to 43 by July. As a result, no NG51 was officially retired by July 1962.

The two locomotives of the second order also served in Natal, ending up working on the branch from Estcourt to Weenen. In 1964 they were both transferred to the Avontuur line in exchange for two newer Class NG G13 locomotives. In Port Elizabeth, they were employed on shed and yard duty and on transfer trips to and from the docks until, after the arrival of the Class 91-000 diesel-electric locomotives in 1973, they were withdrawn from service in October 1974.

== Preservation ==
Of the first three locomotives, only no. NG52 still exists. It was sold to Rustenburg Platinum Mines in 1956 and became their no. 7. After retirement at the mine, it was preserved at the Museum of Man and Science in Johannesburg in 1974, then moved to the Klein Jukskei Motor Museum by 1981 and finally donated to the South African National Railway & Steam Museum. In 2010 it was acquired by Sandstone Estates. By 2011 it was being restored and rebuilt in Bloemfontein. In January 2017, fully rebuilt, it was transferred to the Sandstone Estates Railroad where it made its operational debut in March 2017 during the annual Stars of Sandstone event.

The other two were scrapped after being retired from SAR service.

Both superheated locomotives still exist. No. NG54 was restored in Bloemfontein in 1989, After a period working the Apple Express out of Port Elizabeth, it ended up staged out of service at Humewood Road until it was removed by Sandstone Estates in 2011 for safe-keeping. It was still at Sandstone in July 2017, stored indoors in reasonable condition awaiting a THF decision on whether to leave it at Sandstone or return it to Humewood Road. NG55 was restored to full working order also at Bloemfontein for the Patons Country Narrow Gauge Railway (PCNGR) at Ixopo in Natal by 2005. At the time, the PCNGR was operating tourist excursion trains between Ixopo and Ncalu. By July 2017 no. NG55 was stored in the open at Ixopo awaiting extensive boiler repairs.
