= South African Class NG8 4-6-0 =

1904 narrow-gauge steam locomotive

CGR Type B 4-6-0 South African Class NG8 4-6-0
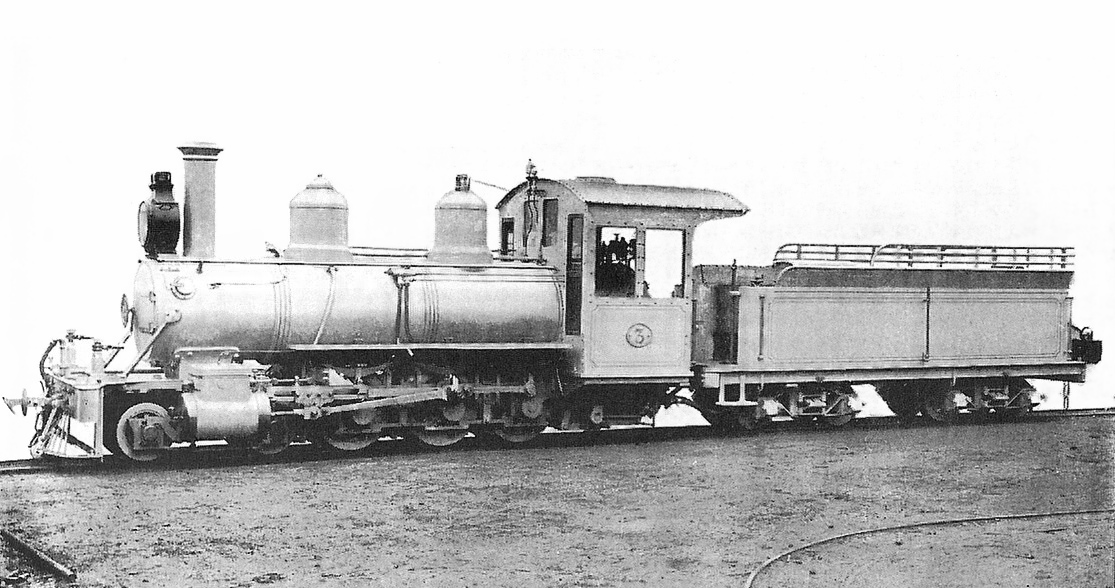
- Bagnall works photograph, c. 1903
Type and origin
- Power type: Steam
- Designer: W.G. Bagnall
- Builder: W.G. Bagnall; Kerr, Stuart and Company
- Serial number: Bagnall 1741-1746, 1967; Kerr, Stuart 1345-1346
- Model: CGR Type B
- Build date: Bagnall 1904 & 1914; Kerr, Stuart 1914
- Total produced: 9
Specifications
- Configuration
  - Whyte: 4-6-0
  - UIC: 2'Cn2
- Driver: 2nd coupled axle
- Gauge: 2 ft (610 mm) narrow
- Coupled dia.: 838 mm (33.0 in)
- Wheelbase
  - Engine: 3,988 mm (13 ft 1.0 in)
  - Coupled: 1,905 mm (6 ft 3.0 in)
- Length
  - Over couplers: 13,535 mm (44 ft 4.9 in)
- Frame type: Bar
- Axle load: 5,700 kg (12,600 lb)
  - Coupled: 5,700 kg (12,600 lb)
- Adhesive weight: 17,000 kg (37,000 lb)
- Loco weight: 20,600 kg (45,400 lb)
- Tender weight: 21,100 kg (46,500 lb)
- Total weight: 41,700 kg (91,900 lb)
- Tender type: 2-axle bogies
- Fuel type: Coal
- Firebox
  - Type: Round-top
  - Grate area: 0.71 m^{2} (7.6 sq ft)
- Boiler pressure: 180 psi (1,241 kPa)
- Heating surface
  - Firebox: 3.76 m^{2} (40.5 sq ft)
  - Tubes: 35.38 m^{2} (380.8 sq ft)
  - Total surface: 39.14 m^{2} (421.3 sq ft)
- Cylinders: Two
- Cylinder size: 11 3/4 in (298 mm) bore 16 in (406 mm) stroke
- Valve gear: Stephenson
- Loco brake: Vacuum
- Couplers: Bell-and-hook
Performance figures
- Tractive effort: 9,032 lbf (40.18 kN) @ 75%
Career
- Operators: Cape Government Railways; South African Railways
- Class: CGR Type B, Improved B SAR Class NG8
- Number in class: 9
- Numbers: CGR 33-38; SAR NG27-NG32, NG36-NG38
- Delivered: 1904 & 1914
- First run: 1904
- Withdrawn: 1931

The South African Railways Class NG8 4-6-0 of 1904 was a narrow-gauge steam locomotive from the pre-Union era in the Cape of Good Hope.

In 1904, the Cape Government Railways placed six Type B 4-6-0 steam locomotives in service on the Avontuur 2 feet (610 millimetres) narrow-gauge line in the Langkloof. In 1912, when these locomotives were assimilated into the South African Railways, they were renumbered with an "NG" prefix to their new numbers.

A further three "Improved B" locomotives were placed in service by the South African Railways in 1914. When a system of grouping narrow-gauge locomotives into classes was eventually introduced somewhere between 1928 and 1930, they were all to be classified as Class NG8, but had already been withdrawn from service.

== Manufacturer ==
The Cape Government Railways (CGR) ordered six narrow-gauge locomotives with a 4-6-0 wheel arrangement and eight-wheeled bogie tenders from W. G. Bagnall in 1903. They were dispatched from the factory between May and August 1904 and, when they entered service later in the same year, were classified as Type B by the CGR.

== Characteristics ==
The design of the locomotive was based on the Baldwin-built 2-6-0 locomotives which had been acquired for use on the Hopefield line in 1902. They had bar frames, copper fireboxes and used Stephenson valve gear. Although the Type B locomotives were built by a British company, they had the same typically American construction and appearance as the Baldwin locomotives. The order initially specified the same 2-6-0 wheel arrangement, but experience with the three Hopefield locomotives led to the decision to alter the design specifications to 4-6-0.

It was claimed that these locomotives could attain a speed of 30 miles per hour (48 kilometres per hour) on the level and haul a load of 100 long tons (101.6 tonnes) up a 1 in 40 (2½%) grade.

== Numbering ==
The Bagnall works list show these first six locomotives as numbered from no. 1 to no. 6, but this is possibly incorrect, since numbers 1 to 4 had, at the time, already been allocated to the CGR's Baldwin 2-6-0 locomotives of 1902, which worked on the Hopefield line.

While it is possible that a separate numbering scheme, also beginning at no. 1, was contemplated for the Avontuur line, the railway renumbering lists of 1910 show these locomotives as numbered in the range from 33 to 38.

== Service ==
=== Cape Government Railways ===
The locomotives were all placed in service on the Langkloof line between Port Elizabeth and Avontuur and became the mainstay of motive power on the Avontuur branch.

=== South African Railways ===
When the Union of South Africa was established on 31 May 1910, the three Colonial government railways (CGR, Natal Government Railways and Central South African Railways) were united under a single administration to control and administer the railways, ports and harbours of the Union. Although the South African Railways and Harbours came into existence in 1910, the actual classification and renumbering of all the rolling stock of the three constituent railways were only implemented with effect from 1 January 1912.

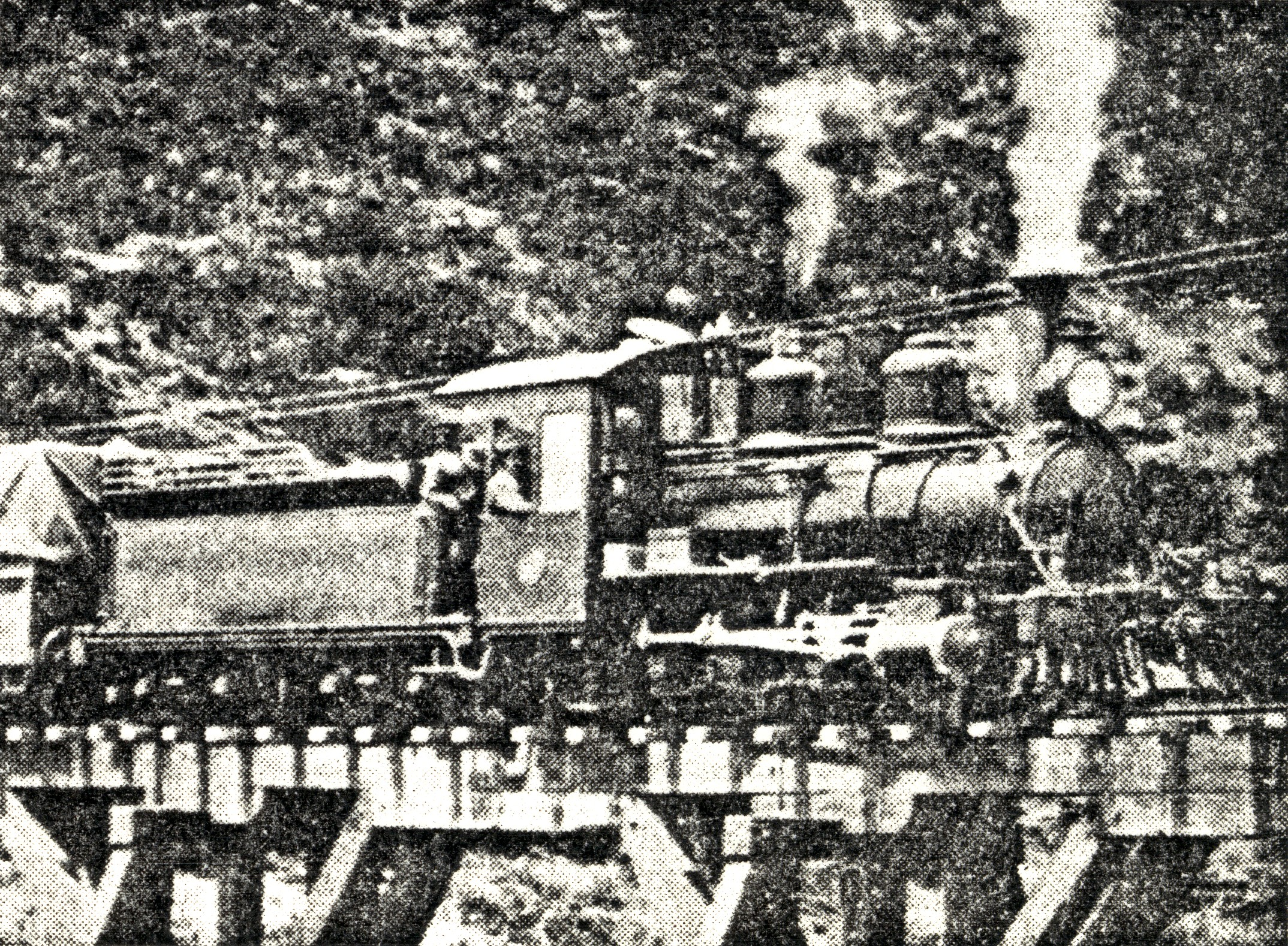

In 1912, the narrow-gauge locomotives were included in the South African Railways (SAR) renumbering scheme and were allocated new engine numbers with an "NG" prefix, but they were not arranged in locomotive classes. The six Type B locomotives were allocated SAR numbers NG27 to NG32.

A further three locomotives, with slightly longer boilers, were ordered by the SAR in 1913. The first one of these was also built by Bagnall and delivered in 1914, numbered NG36. The other two were built by Kerr, Stuart and Company. They were dispatched from the builders in September 1914 and numbered NG37 and NG38. These three locomotives were commonly referred to as the Improved B.

Although these engines worked mainly in the Langkloof, some assisted on the Kalbaskraal branch to Saldanha and, judging from photographs, possibly in Natal as well.

=== First World War ===
In 1915, shortly after the outbreak of the First World War, the German South West Africa colony was occupied by the Union Defence Forces. Since a large part of the territory's railway infrastructure and rolling stock was destroyed or damaged by retreating German forces, an urgent need arose for locomotives for use on the narrow-gauge lines in that territory. In 1917, numbers NG28, NG30, NG31, NG32, NG36 and NG37 were transferred to the Defence Department for service in South West Africa. All six are believed to have returned to South Africa after the war.

== Narrow-gauge classification ==
With one exception, the nine locomotives were all withdrawn from service by 1931 and scrapped. No. NG27 was sold to the Eastern Province Cement Company and employed to haul limestone on its industrial line from New Brighton in Port Elizabeth, which linked up with the Avontuur branch at Chelsea Junction.

A system of grouping narrow-gauge locomotives into classes was only adopted at some time between 1928 and 1930. However, these locomotives did not survive in service long enough to become the Class NG8 which had apparently been reserved for them when the classification system was being planned.
