= CGR Type A 2-6-4T =

Class of 2 South African 2–6–4T locomotives

CGR Type A 2-6-4T South African NG 2-6-4T 1902
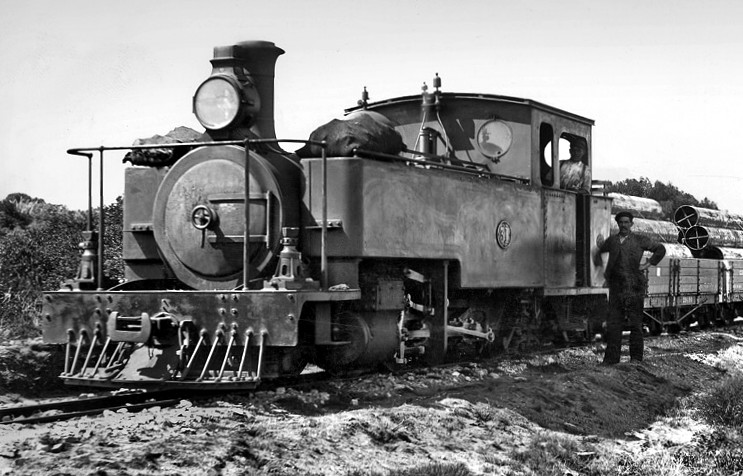
- CGR Type A 2-6-4T no. 31, SAR no. NG25
Type and origin
- Power type: Steam
- Designer: Manning Wardle & Company
- Builder: Manning Wardle & Company
- Order number: 51200
- Serial number: 1564 & 1565
- Build date: Ex works 3 September 1902
Specifications
- Configuration
  - Whyte: 2-6-4T
  - UIC: 1'C2'n2t
- Driver: 2nd coupled axle
- Gauge: 2 ft (610 mm) narrow
- Leading dia.: 22 in (559 mm)
- Coupled dia.: 33 in (838 mm)
- Trailing dia.: 22 in (559 mm)
- Wheelbase: 20 ft 9 in (6,325 mm)
  - Coupled: 6 ft (1,829 mm)
  - Trailing: 4 ft (1,219 mm)
- Length
  - Over couplers: 28 ft 11 in (8,814 mm)
- Width: 7 ft 9 in (2,362 mm)
- Height: 9 ft 11 in (3,023 mm)
- Frame type: Plate
- Axle load: 8 LT 7 cwt (8,484 kg)
- Loco weight: 34 LT 15 cwt (35,310 kg)
- Fuel type: Coal
- Fuel capacity: 2 LT (2.0 t)
- Water cap.: 1,000 imp gal (4,550 L)
- Firebox
  - Type: Round-top
  - Grate area: 12 sq ft (1.1 m^{2})
- Boiler
  - Pitch: 4 ft 9 in (1,448 mm)
  - Diameter: 3 ft 5 in (1,041 mm)
- Boiler pressure: 180 psi (1,241 kPa)
- Cylinders: Two
- Cylinder size: 13 in (330 mm) bore 16 in (406 mm) stroke
- Valve gear: Walschaerts
- Loco brake: Steam brakes
- Couplers: Bell-and-hook
Performance figures
- Tractive effort: 11,062 lbf (49.21 kN) @ 75%
Career
- Operators: Cape Government Railways; South African Railways
- Class: Type A
- Number in class: 2
- Numbers: CGR 31-32, SAR NG25-NG26
- Delivered: 1902
- First run: 1902
- Withdrawn: 1929

The Cape Government Railways Type A 2-6-4T of 1902 was a South African steam locomotive from the pre-Union era in the Cape of Good Hope.

In 1902, the Cape Government Railways placed two Type A 2-6-4T narrow gauge steam locomotives in construction service on the Avontuur branch. In 1912, these locomotives were assimilated into the South African Railways and renumbered.

== Langkloof railway ==
In April 1902, authority was granted for the construction of the Langkloof 2 ft (610 mm) narrow gauge railway from Port Elizabeth via Humansdorp to Avontuur, a total distance of 177 miles (285 kilometres). It was to become one of the most important narrow gauge railways in South Africa and passed through districts which were famous for general agriculture and the export of wheat and fruit, especially apples. The line was laid with 35 pounds per yard (17 kilograms per metre) rail and was completed to Avontuur on 10 December 1906.

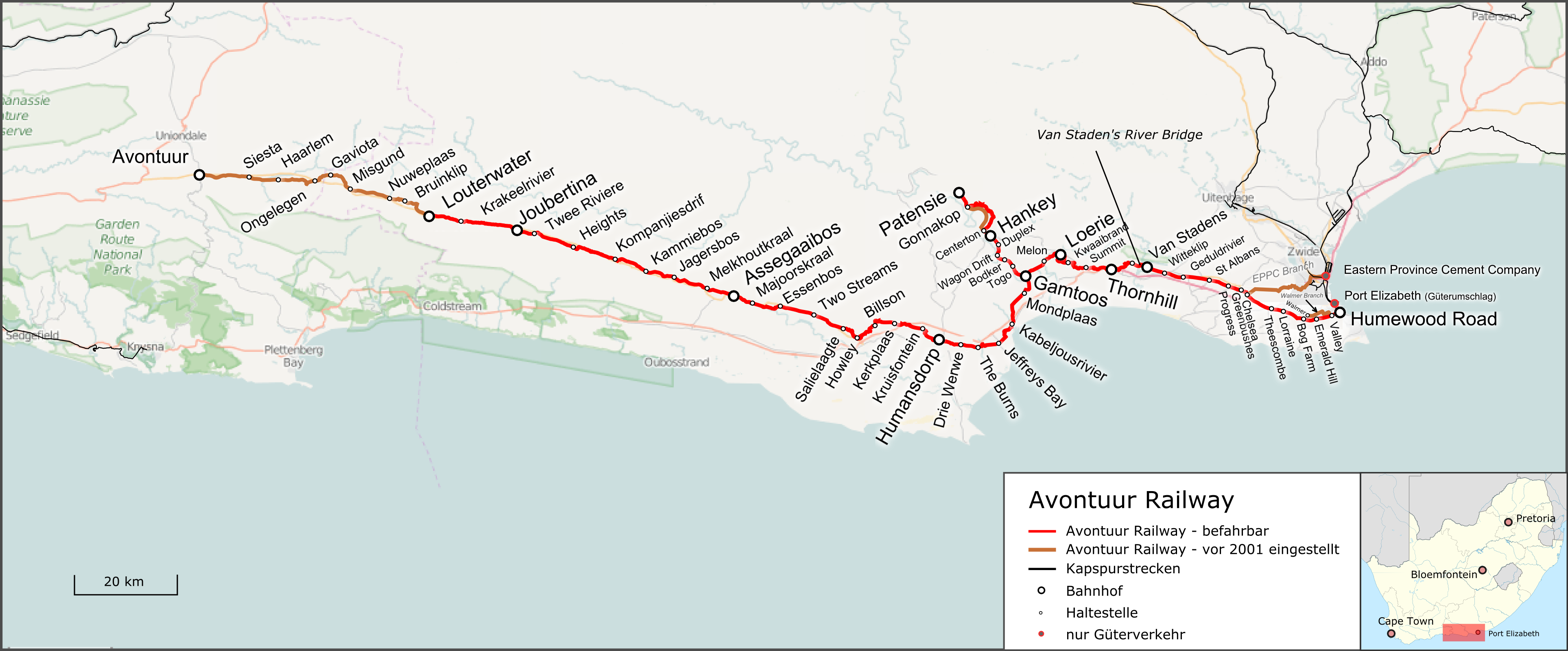
Avontuur Railway

Coal consumption on the line averaged 54 pounds (24 kilograms) per train mile. A load from Port Elizabeth to Avontuur had to be hauled up 6,835 feet (2,083 metres) and, on the return journey, 3,963 feet (1,208 metres). This, combined with the many sharp curves and steep gradients of 1 in 40 (2.5%) compensated, prevented a continuous high speed from being attained.

== Manufacturer ==
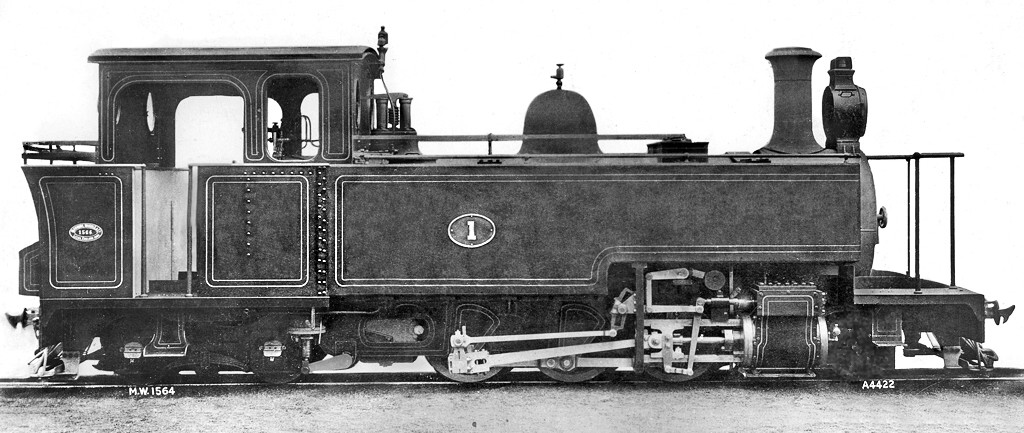
M&W works picture of no. 31

Two 2-6-4 Adriatic type narrow gauge tank steam locomotives were supplied to the Cape Government Railways (CGR) by Manning Wardle and Company in 1902. They were designated Type A and numbered 31 and 32.

These locomotives were recorded pulling a 150 long tons (152 tonnes) train up a 1 in 40 (2.5%) grade during tests.

== Service ==
=== Cape Government Railways ===
Both locomotives were placed in construction service on the Avontuur narrow gauge railway and were also used as the first road power on the railway. At a width of 7 feet 9 inches (2,362 millimetres), they were extremely large and were the widest locomotives to see service on any of the 2 feet (610 millimetres) narrow gauge lines in South Africa.

=== South African Railways ===
When the Union of South Africa was established on 31 May 1910, the three Colonial government railways (CGR, Natal Government Railways and Central South African Railways) were united under a single administration to control and administer the railways, ports and harbours of the Union. Although the South African Railways and Harbours came into existence in 1910, the actual classification and renumbering of all the rolling stock of the three constituent railways were only implemented with effect from 1 January 1912.

The two locomotives were renumbered to NG25 and NG26 on the South African Railways (SAR), with the NG prefix identifying them as narrow gauge locomotives in the SAR registers. They remained in service on the Avontuur branch for the duration of their service lives, until they were withdrawn in 1929 without having been classified by the SAR.
