= Ixopo =

Ixopo Stuartstown
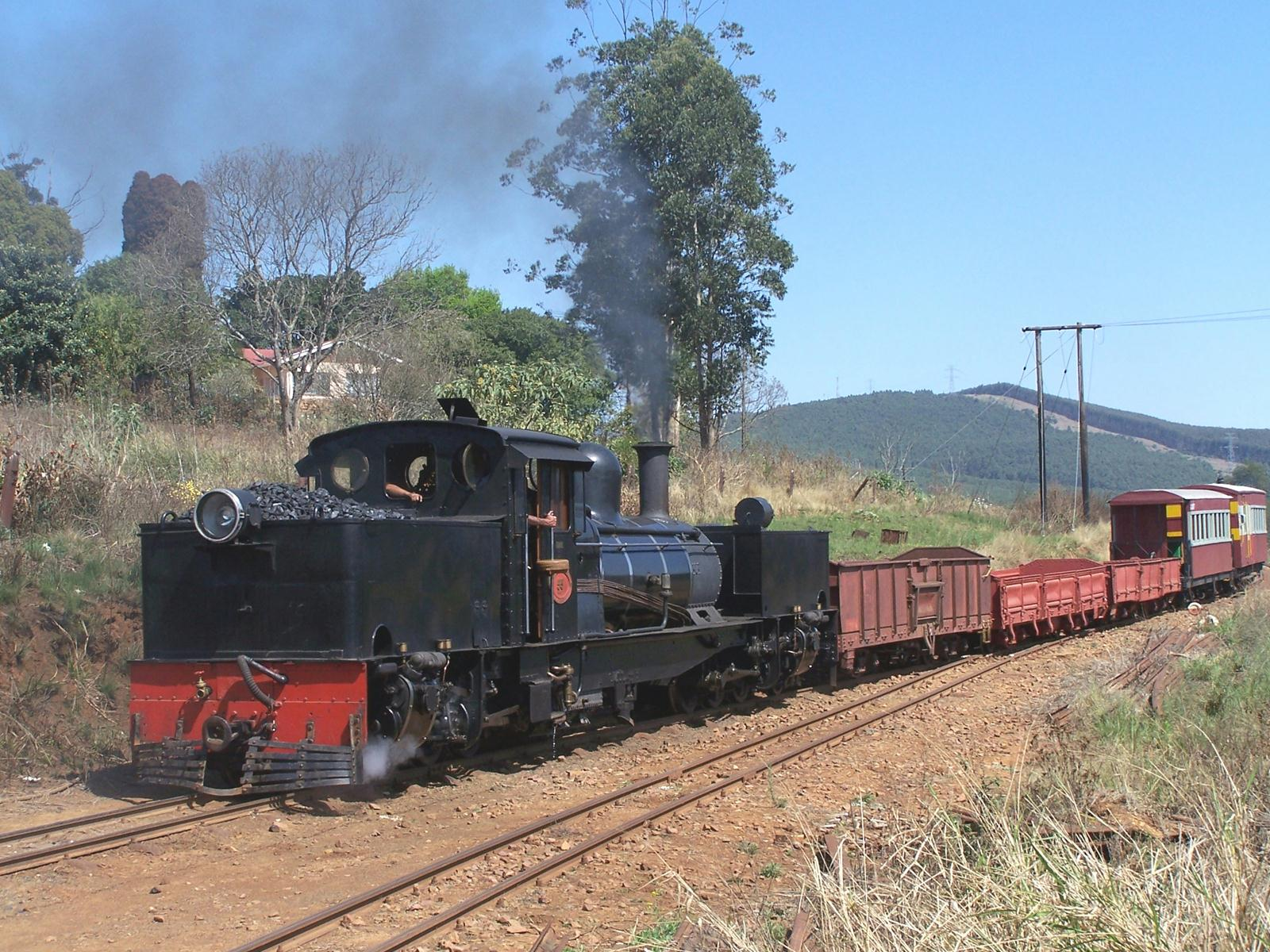
- SAR Class NG G11 no. NG55 arriving at Ixopo station

- Location within KwaZulu-Natal Location within South Africa
- Coordinates: 30°09′26″S 30°03′53″E
- Country: South Africa
- Province: KwaZulu-Natal
- District: Harry Gwala
- Municipality: Johannes Phumani Phungula

Area
  - Total: 10.85 km^{2} (4.19 sq mi)

Population (2011)
  - Total: 12,461
  - Density: 1,148/km^{2} (2,975/sq mi)

Racial makeup (2011)
  - Black African: 90.6%
  - Coloured: 5.6%
  - Indian/Asian: 1.9%
  - White: 1.4%
  - Other: 0.5%

First languages (2011)
  - Zulu: 74.8%
  - English: 10.6%
  - Xhosa: 7.6%
  - Sotho: 2.2%
  - Other: 4.8%
- Time zone: UTC+2 (SAST)
- Postal code (street): 3276
- PO box: 3276
- Area code: 039

Ixopo, also known as Stuartstown, is a town situated on a tributary of the uMkhomazi River along the R56 highway in the midlands of KwaZulu-Natal, South Africa.

== Background ==
The town was laid out in 1878 and named after M Stuart, Resident Magistrate of the surrounding district, who was killed at the Battle of Ingogo in 1881. Its name is derived from the Zulu onomatopoeic word, eXobo, describing the sound made as cattle squelch through mud. The 'x', in Zulu, is pronounced as a lateral click.

The town is most famously described by Alan Paton in the opening lines of Cry, the Beloved Country: "There is a lovely road which runs from Ixopo into the hills. These hills are grass covered and rolling, and they are lovely beyond any singing of it."

Until the mid-1980s, Ixopo was served by a railway station on the 610 mm (2 ft 0 in) narrow gauge Umzinto - Donnybrook narrow gauge railway.

== Notable people ==
- Thabo Nodada (Footballer)
- Purity Nomthandazo Malinga (Bishop)
- Ray Zondo (Chief Justice, Constitutional Court of South Africa)
