= Coleford Nature Reserve =

Nature reserve in South Africa

- IUCN category IV (habitat/species management area)
- Interactive map of Coleford Nature Reserve
- Location: KwaSani Local Municipality, Harry Gwala District Municipality
- Nearest city: Underberg
- Coordinates: 29°56′S 29°26′E
- Area: 1,272 hectares (3,140 acres)
- Established: 1948
- Designated: 1959
- Governing body: Ezemvelo KZN Wildlife

Coleford Nature Reserve is a provincial nature reserve located in the Southern Drakensberg region of KwaZulu-Natal, South Africa. Situated approximately 18 kilometres south of Underberg, the reserve protects 1,272 hectares (3,140 acres) of Drakensberg Foothill Moist Grassland, a threatened vegetation type endemic to the region. The reserve is named after James Cole, the original European settler to the area, who despite owning the land neither farmed nor lived at Coleford.

The reserve forms part of the Greater Ingwangwana River Important Bird Area (IBA) and is recognised as critical habitat for the endangered wattled crane (Bugeranus carunculatus) and the critically endangered white-winged flufftail (Sarothrura ayresi).

== Geography and climate ==
Coleford Nature Reserve lies within the Dr Nkosazana Dlamini Zuma Local Municipality of the Harry Gwala District Municipality (formerly Sisonke District Municipality), in the foothills of the Drakensberg escarpment. The terrain consists primarily of hilly grassland and wetland, with cliffs of Beaufort Group sandstone in the north-western portions rising above the river valley.

The principal hydrological feature is the Ngwagwane River, which flows south-eastward through the southern portion of the reserve. The river is joined by the Ndawana River, its major tributary, in the south-eastern corner of the reserve. The wetlands associated with these rivers are of significant conservation importance for waterbirds and amphibians.

The region experiences a temperate highland climate with summer rainfall. The Sub-Escarpment Grassland Bioregion, found at lower altitudes of the Drakensberg foothills, typically receives mean annual precipitation of approximately 763 mm with mean annual temperatures around 15.5°C and lower frost incidence compared to higher-altitude Drakensberg grasslands.

== History ==
The area known as Coleford was historically described as "a veritable no-man's land", serving as a refuge for bandits, cattle rustlers, and gun runners during the colonial period. The lawless reputation made it uninviting to early settlers and it was reportedly not permanently inhabited even by indigenous communities at the time of European arrival.

The reserve was established in 1948 and formally proclaimed in 1959. Although the reserve was neglected for a period, it is now actively managed by Ezemvelo KZN Wildlife as a key component of the protected area system in south-western KwaZulu-Natal.

== Flora ==
The vegetation is classified as Drakensberg Foothill Moist Grassland (Gs 10), a threatened ecosystem associated with highly weathered upland soils derived from dolerite and sandstone. This grassland type occurs at elevations between 880 and 1,860 metres above sea level and is rich in restricted-range plant species. The vegetation type has been extensively reduced by agriculture and commercial forestry across its historical range.

The reserve also contains wetland vegetation communities including sedge marshes and floodplain habitats that are critical for the white-winged flufftail. These wetlands were historically modified by drainage ditches, but restoration efforts beginning in 1984 have successfully rehabilitated portions of the habitat.

== Fauna ==
=== Mammals ===
The reserve supports populations of several antelope species including black wildebeest (Connochaetes gnou), blesbok (Damaliscus pygargus phillipsi), red hartebeest (Alcelaphus buselaphus caama), southern reedbuck (Redunca arundinum), grey rhebok (Pelea capreolus), common duiker (Sylvicapra grimmia), and oribi (Ourebia ourebi). The oribi is listed as vulnerable nationally.

Two Red Data mammal species occur: the serval (Leptailurus serval) and African striped weasel (Poecilogale albinucha), both classified as rare.

=== Avifauna ===
The wetlands and grasslands of Coleford support several globally and regionally threatened bird species:

Wattled crane (Bugeranus carunculatus): Coleford was a well-known nesting site until 1990, when disturbance from fishing paths and grazing horses apparently caused the cranes to abandon the area. Following habitat restoration and removal of livestock, wattled cranes returned and bred successfully in 2013 and 2014. The species is the largest and most wetland-dependent of Africa's crane species, relying on undisturbed high-altitude wetland and grassland habitats. The wattled crane was downlisted from Critically Endangered to Endangered in South Africa in 2025 following sustained conservation efforts, with the KwaZulu-Natal population increasing from 267 individuals in 2015 to 304 in 2024.

White-winged flufftail (Sarothrura ayresi): This critically endangered species has been confirmed at Coleford as part of passive monitoring surveys conducted between 2020 and 2025. The reserve is one of only seven historical locations in South Africa where the species has been recently verified. Research using camera traps has revealed important information about the species' habitat preferences, with birds occupying wetland areas dominated by sedges and Typha with specific vegetation height and water depth characteristics. The first breeding evidence for the species in South Africa was confirmed in 2018.

Other notable species include the Cape vulture (Gyps coprotheres), bush blackcap (Lioptilus nigricapillus), African marsh harrier (Circus ranivorus), black harrier (Circus maurus), blue crane (Anthropoides paradiseus), grey crowned crane (Balearica regulorum), Denham's bustard (Neotis denhami), southern ground hornbill (Bucorvus leadbeateri), striped flufftail (Sarothrura affinis), half-collared kingfisher (Alcedo semitorquata), buff-streaked chat (Campicoloides bifasciata), sentinel rock thrush (Monticola explorator), and black-winged lapwing (Vanellus melanopterus). The black stork (Ciconia nigra) breeds in the nearby mountains and forages within the reserve.

=== Fish ===
The Ngwagwane River and four stocked dams within the reserve support populations of rainbow trout (Oncorhynchus mykiss), an introduced sport fish, as well as native species including Natal yellowfish (Labeobarbus natalensis), chubbyhead barb (Enteromius anoplus), and African longfin eel (Anguilla mossambica). The Natal yellowfish is endemic to KwaZulu-Natal Province and represents one of the most widespread indigenous freshwater fishes in the region, occurring from the Drakensberg foothills to the coastal lowlands.

== Recreation and tourism ==
Coleford has historically been popular for fly fishing, with the Ngwagwane River and its dams providing excellent trout fishing opportunities. Provincial fishing licences and daily angling permits are required and are obtainable from the reserve office.

The reserve previously operated a hutted rest camp with accommodation, but this facility has been closed to the public for an extended period. Hiking and birdwatching are available, with a small bird hide for wetland observation.

The reserve is accessible via Coleford Road from Underberg and provides access to the nearby uKhahlamba Drakensberg Park World Heritage Site via the Ngoangoana Gate.

== Conservation ==
The main conservation threats facing the reserve include encroachment by invasive alien plants and poaching, which may impact wattled cranes nesting in the surrounding wetlands. The Ngwagwane River catchment is recognised as significant for biodiversity conservation, and the wetland is rated as one of the priority wetlands of KwaZulu-Natal.

Anthropogenic increases in nutrient supply, including atmospheric nitrogen deposition, and changes in herbivore abundance may alter vegetation and threaten species in remaining grassland fragments. Research has demonstrated that nitrogen and phosphorus additions can increase productivity but reduce species richness in Drakensberg Foothill Moist Grassland.

Management objectives include conserving the biodiversity of the Drakensberg foothills, protecting rare and endemic species, maintaining vulnerable and ecologically sensitive habitat types, and contributing to the functioning of the Ngwagwane River catchment.

== See also ==
- Himeville Nature Reserve
- Vergelegen Nature Reserve
- Ntsikeni Nature Reserve
- uKhahlamba Drakensberg Park
- Important Bird Areas of South Africa
