= Ingwe Local Municipality =

Coordinates: 30°01′35″S 29°50′23″E

Ingwe
- Former local municipality
- Seal

- Location in KwaZulu-Natal
- Country: South Africa
- Province: KwaZulu-Natal
- District: Harry Gwala
- Seat: Creighton
- Wards: 11

Government
  - Type: Municipal council
  - Mayor: Nomangungu Luzulane

Area
  - Total: 1,976 km^{2} (763 sq mi)

Population (2011)
  - Total: 100,548
  - Density: 50.88/km^{2} (131.8/sq mi)

Racial makeup (2011)
  - Black African: 98.7%
  - Coloured: 0.2%
  - Indian/Asian: 0.1%
  - White: 0.8%

First languages (2011)
  - Zulu: 94.7%
  - English: 1.6%
  - Southern Ndebele: 1.2%
  - Other: 2.5%
- Time zone: UTC+2 (SAST)
- Municipal code: KZN431

Ingwe Local Municipality was an administrative area in the Harry Gwala District of KwaZulu-Natal in South Africa. Ingwe is an isiZulu name word that means leopard. The municipality was given the name because there were leopards in this area many years ago.

The area of the former Ingwe municipality is exceptionally poor and underdeveloped, relying heavily on agriculture as the main source of livelihood. The lack of a major trading centre such as the neighbouring towns of Underberg and Ixopo has limited the economic growth opportunities for this municipality.

After the municipal elections on 3 August 2016 it was merged with Kwa Sani Local Municipality into the new Dr Nkosazana Dlamini Zuma Local Municipality.

== Main places ==
The 2001 census divided the municipality into the following main places:

Place	Code	Area (km^{2})	Population
Amacala Gwala	54701	20.29	5,387
Amangwane	54702	29.09	1,095
Bhidla	54703	283.82	35,404
Bulwer	54704	4.03	731
Creighton	54705	3.49	456
Donnybrook	54706	0.92	218
Esibonelo Esihle	54707	81.96	7,000
Impendle	54708	211.66	920
Ixopo	54710	16.75	2,982
Madzikone	54711	59.00	10,602
Memela	54712	87.40	19,319
Ncwadi	54713	35.43	3,974
Nxamalala	54714	3.67	0
Sandanezwe	54715	42.72	4,827
Tarsvaly	54716	2.03	990
Zashuke	54717	79.29	6,827
Remainder of the municipality	54709	1,008.65	6,819

== Politics ==
The municipal council consisted of twenty-two members elected by mixed-member proportional representation. Eleven councillors were elected by first-past-the-post voting in eleven wards, while the remaining eleven were chosen from party lists so that the total number of party representatives was proportional to the number of votes received. In the election of 18 May 2011 the African National Congress (ANC) won a majority of sixteen seats on the council. The following table shows the results of the election.

Party	Votes				Seats		
Party	Ward	List	Total	%	Ward	List	Total
ANC	19,846	20,588	40,434	72.9	11	5	16
IFP	3,183	3,140	6,323	11.4	0	3	3
NFP	2,869	3,038	5,907	10.7	0	2	2
DA	517	776	1,293	2.3	0	1	1
Independent	916	–	916	1.7	0	–	0
ACDP	329	250	579	1.0	0	0	0
Total	27,660	27,792	55,452	100.0	11	11	22
Spoilt votes	726	673	1,399				
