= Salvia tysonii =

Conservation status
- Least Concern (SANBI Red List)

Scientific classification
- Kingdom: Plantae
- Clade: Embryophytes
- Clade: Tracheophytes
- Clade: Angiosperms
- Clade: Eudicots
- Clade: Asterids
- Order: Lamiales
- Family: Lamiaceae
- Genus: Salvia
- Species: S. tysonii

Binomial name
- Salvia tysonii Skan

Species of flowering plant

Salvia tysonii is a rarely encountered species of sage commonly called Tambookie sage. It is found in South Africa′s Eastern Cape and KwaZulu-Natal provinces, growing in grassland, typically on rocky slopes or alongside streams at an elevation of 750–1,450 m (2,460–4,760 ft).

== Description ==
Salvia tysonii is a perennial herb with a creeping woody rootstock. Stems are erect, usually simple and branching above, stout and four-angled, reaching up to 1.4 m (4 ft 7 in) in height, and are densely covered with short, curled non-glandular hairs and oil globules.

Leaves are runcinate and irregularly serrate, up to about 9.5 cm × 5 cm (3.7 in × 2.0 in), with a large terminal lobe; the upper surface bears scattered short hairs, while the lower surface is densely hairy with oil glands. Lower leaves are petiolate, the uppermost becoming nearly sessile.

The inflorescence is usually much branched, with up to 12–24 verticils, each bearing about eight flowers, spaced below and closer together above. Floral leaves are broadly ovate and long-acuminate, with small bracts present.

Flowers are borne on short pedicels up to 3 mm (0.12 in) long. The calyx is tubular, about 8.5 mm (0.33 in) long, frequently tinged purple and sparsely hairy, with a truncate upper lip and two triangular teeth on the lower lip.

The corolla is reddish or blue, about 14 mm (0.55 in) long; the lower lip is longer than the upper, and the tube is straight and without an annulus. Nutlets are light brown with a finely tuberculate surface.

S. tysonii flowers from December to March.

== Etymology ==
The species is named for William Tyson (1851–1920), a teacher and highly active plant collector who came to South Africa from Jamaica in 1874. He collected a specimen of the plant on the banks of the Umzimkulu River near Clydesdale while working in Kokstad in the 1880s. Other taxa named in his honour are Dierama tysonii, Euryops tysonii, Jamesbrittenia tysonii, Scabiosa tysonii, Stachys tysonii, and the genus Tysonia, since renamed Afrotysonia.
