= Ntsikeni Nature Reserve =

South African wetlands area

- Ntsikeni-natuurreservaat
- Coordinates: 30°8′S 29°28′E
- Area: 9,286.61 hectares (92.8661 km^{2})
- Governing body: Ezemvelo KZN Wildlife
- Website: http://www.kznwildlife.com/Ntsikeni.html

Ramsar Wetland
- Official name: Ntsikeni Nature Reserve
- Designated: 2 February 2010
- Reference no.: 2291
- Ntsikeni Nature Reserve (South Africa) Ntsikeni Nature Reserve (KwaZulu-Natal)

Ntsikeni Nature Reserve, in Griqualand East, is the largest wetland and one of the highest above sea level in South Africa.

== Location ==
The reserve lies in the foothills of the Drakensberg, between the towns of Creighton and Franklin in southern KwaZulu-Natal, north of Kokstad, east of the R617 road, and south of Himeville, Underberg, and the Coleford Nature Reserve.

== Reserve ==
The reserve covers 9,200 hectares, of which 1,070 consist of a wetland on a very high plateau. This area reaches a height of 1,750 m above sea level, and its highest peak is often shrouded in thick mist, or reaching above it. Snow occurs there annually. The lake drains northward toward the headwaters of the Umzimkulu River, playing a major role in the water supply and conservation methods of the communities downstream. The reserve's remote location has slowed ecological changes to the area, leaving it ideal for hiking, horse riding, mountain biking, and wildlife viewing. Accommodations are available. The roads in the reserve are in poor condition.

== Flora and fauna ==
Around 1,300 plant species, including 65 species of orchids, can be found here. More than 120 species of birds live here, including Eurasian bittern, wattled crane, African quail, African rail, flufftail, African grass owl, Cape vulture, bearded vulture, yellow-breasted pipit, Southern bald ibis, black harrier, purple heron, Cape eagle-owl, African marsh harrier, and Denham's bustard, as well as songbirds in the family Cisticolidae. Other animals here include the Southern reedbuck, African clawless otter, oribi, mountain reedbuck, grey rhebok, common duiker, and the long-toed tree frog (Leptopelis xenodactylus) In 2008, black wildebeest and blesbok were transferred to Ntsikeni.

== History ==
The area was declared a nature reserve in 1978. A boundary adjustment moved it from Eastern Cape into KwaZulu-Natal province in 2006. In 2010, it was declared a Ramsar site.

== See also ==
- Ramsar Convention

== Sources ==
- Bryan, Peter and John Graham: "Ntikeni Nature Reserve - an overlooked IBA." In Africa Birds and Birding, February/March 2006. www.fitzpatrick.uct.ac.za
- www.saramsar.com
