= Rondedraai =

- Location within KwaZulu-Natal Location within South Africa
- Coordinates: 30.415°S 29.945°E
- Country: South Africa
- Province: KwaZulu-Natal
- District: Harry Gwala
- Municipality: Umzimkhulu

Area
  - Total: 2.69 km^{2} (1.04 sq mi)

Population (2011)
  - Total: 351
  - Density: 130/km^{2} (338/sq mi)

Racial makeup (2011)
  - Black African: 99.7%
  - Other: 0.3%

First languages (2011)
  - Zulu: 94.3%
  - Xhosa: 3.4%
  - Sign language: 1.4%
  - Other: 0.9%
- Time zone: UTC+2 (SAST)

Rondedraai is a town in Harry Gwala District Municipality in the KwaZulu-Natal province of South Africa.
