= Kwa Sani Local Municipality =

Coordinates: 29°45′S 29°30′E

Kwa Sani
- Former local municipality
- Seal

- Location in KwaZulu-Natal
- Country: South Africa
- Province: KwaZulu-Natal
- District: Harry Gwala
- Seat: Himeville
- Wards: 4

Government
  - Type: Municipal council
  - Mayor: Thulani Khuluse

Area
  - Total: 1,852 km^{2} (715 sq mi)

Population (2011)
  - Total: 12,898
  - Density: 6.964/km^{2} (18.04/sq mi)

Racial makeup (2011)
  - Black African: 87.9%
  - Coloured: 0.9%
  - Indian/Asian: 0.4%
  - White: 10.5%

First languages (2011)
  - Zulu: 82.2%
  - English: 10.6%
  - Xhosa: 2.4%
  - Sotho: 1.6%
  - Other: 3.2%
- Time zone: UTC+2 (SAST)
- Municipal code: KZN432

Kwa Sani Local Municipality was an administrative area in the Harry Gwala of KwaZulu-Natal in South Africa.

Kwa Sani is an isiZulu name. "Kwa" means "at" and "Sani" means "San people". The name was chosen because it was easy to pronounce for overseas visitors to the World Heritage Site of uKhahlamba.

After the municipal elections on 3 August 2016 it was merged with Ingwe Local Municipality into the new Dr Nkosazana Dlamini Zuma Local Municipality.

== Main places ==
The 2001 census divided the municipality into the following main places:

Place	Code	Area (km^{2})	Population
Batlokoa	54801	40.43	4,952
Himeville	54802	8.33	1,037
Isiminza	54803	41.99	2,683
Nxamalala	54805	2.25	300
Underberg Part 1	54806	19.93	2,054
Underberg Part 2	54808	3.27	298
Vergelegen Nature Reserve	54807	0.54	6
Remainder of the municipality	54804	1,062.85	3,976

== Politics ==
The municipal council consisted of seven members elected by mixed-member proportional representation. Four councillors were elected by first-past-the-post voting in four wards, while the remaining three were chosen from party lists so that the total number of party representatives was proportional to the number of votes received. In the election of 18 May 2011 the African National Congress (ANC) won a majority of five seats on the council. The following table shows the results of the election.

Party	Votes				Seats		
Party	Ward	List	Total	%	Ward	List	Total
ANC	2,611	2,800	5,411	65.6	4	1	5
DA	996	995	1,991	24.2	0	2	2
NFP	205	193	398	4.8	0	0	0
IFP	85	95	180	2.2	0	0	0
Independent	180	–	180	2.2	0	–	0
ACDP	22	22	44	0.5	0	0	0
COPE	18	25	43	0.5	0	0	0
Total	4,117	4,130	8,247	100.0	4	3	7
Spoilt votes	116	105	221				
