= UMuziwabantu Local Municipality elections =

Local elections in KwaZulu-Natal, South Africa

The uMuziwabantu Local Municipality council consists of twenty-one members elected by mixed-member proportional representation. Eleven councillors are elected by first-past-the-post voting in ten wards, while the remaining ten are chosen from party lists so that the total number of party representatives is proportional to the number of votes received.

In the election of 4 November 2026, no party won a majority. The uMkhonto weSizwe Party won the largest number of seats on the council, with eight.

== Results ==
The following table shows the composition of the council after past elections.

Event	ANC	DA	EFF	IFP	MKP	Other	Total
2000 election	7	1	—	10	—	0	18
2006 election	12	0	—	6	—	0	18
2011 election	12	1	—	2	—	4	19
2016 election	14	1	1	4	—	—	20
2021 election	10	1	2	5	—	3	21
2026 election	7	1	1	4	8	0	21

== December 2000 election ==
The following table shows the results of the 2000 election.

Party	Ward			List			Total seats
Party	Votes	%	Seats	Votes	%	Seats	Total seats
Inkatha Freedom Party	8,656	57.20	6	8,467	56.02	4	10
African National Congress	5,792	38.28	3	5,748	38.03	4	7
Democratic Alliance	532	3.52	0	567	3.75	1	1
African Christian Democratic Party	152	1.00	0	332	2.20	0	0
Total	15,132	100.00	9	15,114	100.00	9	18
Valid votes	15,132	97.93		15,114	97.81		
Invalid/blank votes	320	2.07		338	2.19		
Total votes	15,452	100.00		15,452	100.00		
Registered voters/turnout	29,635	52.14		29,635	52.14		

== March 2006 election ==
The following table shows the results of the 2006 election.

Party	Ward			List			Total seats
Party	Votes	%	Seats	Votes	%	Seats	Total seats
African National Congress	12,260	64.56	7	12,479	65.72	5	12
Inkatha Freedom Party	6,206	32.68	2	5,903	31.09	4	6
Democratic Alliance	398	2.10	0	396	2.09	0	0
National Democratic Convention	127	0.67	0	209	1.10	0	0
Total	18,991	100.00	9	18,987	100.00	9	18
Valid votes	18,991	98.01		18,987	98.04		
Invalid/blank votes	386	1.99		380	1.96		
Total votes	19,377	100.00		19,367	100.00		
Registered voters/turnout	34,116	56.80		34,116	56.77		

== May 2011 election ==
The following table shows the results of the 2011 election.

Party	Ward			List			Total seats
Party	Votes	%	Seats	Votes	%	Seats	Total seats
African National Congress	15,265	63.23	9	15,620	64.65	3	12
National Freedom Party	4,753	19.69	1	4,530	18.75	3	4
Inkatha Freedom Party	2,920	12.10	0	2,797	11.58	2	2
Democratic Alliance	910	3.77	0	929	3.85	1	1
Congress of the People	294	1.22	0	284	1.18	0	0
Total	24,142	100.00	10	24,160	100.00	9	19
Valid votes	24,142	97.94		24,160	97.98		
Invalid/blank votes	508	2.06		499	2.02		
Total votes	24,650	100.00		24,659	100.00		
Registered voters/turnout	37,819	65.18		37,819	65.20		

== August 2016 election ==
The following table shows the results of the 2016 election.

Party	Ward			List			Total seats
Party	Votes	%	Seats	Votes	%	Seats	Total seats
African National Congress	19,852	71.13	9	20,106	72.02	5	14
Inkatha Freedom Party	6,077	21.77	1	5,881	21.07	3	4
Democratic Alliance	1,055	3.78	0	1,041	3.73	1	1
Economic Freedom Fighters	926	3.32	0	890	3.19	1	1
Total	27,910	100.00	10	27,918	100.00	10	20
Valid votes	27,910	97.71		27,918	97.65		
Invalid/blank votes	653	2.29		671	2.35		
Total votes	28,563	100.00		28,589	100.00		
Registered voters/turnout	46,019	62.07		46,019	62.12		

== November 2021 election ==
The following table shows the results of the 2021 election.

Party	Ward			List			Total seats
Party	Votes	%	Seats	Votes	%	Seats	Total seats
African National Congress	11,330	47.57	9	11,234	46.98	1	10
Inkatha Freedom Party	5,680	23.85	1	5,789	24.21	4	5
Economic Freedom Fighters	1,958	8.22	0	2,016	8.43	2	2
Al Jama-ah	1,646	6.91	1	1,617	6.76	1	2
Abantu Batho Congress	1,194	5.01	0	1,170	4.89	1	1
Democratic Alliance	813	3.41	0	773	3.23	1	1
African Independent Congress	348	1.46	0	492	2.06	0	0
African Transformation Movement	331	1.39	0	347	1.45	0	0
National Freedom Party	195	0.82	0	370	1.55	0	0
Independent candidates	215	0.90	0				0
People's Freedom Party	108	0.45	0	106	0.44	0	0
Total	23,818	100.00	11	23,914	100.00	10	21
Valid votes	23,818	97.03		23,914	96.96		
Invalid/blank votes	729	2.97		750	3.04		
Total votes	24,547	100.00		24,664	100.00		
Registered voters/turnout	45,078	54.45		45,078	54.71		

=== By-elections from November 2021 ===
The following by-elections were held to fill vacant ward seats in the period since the election in November 2021.

Date	Ward	Party of the previous councillor	Party of the newly elected councillor
13 October 2022	11	Al Jama-ah	Inkatha Freedom Party

Most of ward 11 consists of the town of Harding, which was severely affected by the unrest in July 2021. A new ward, it was won by Sheikh Mondli Ncane from Al Jama-ah (AJ). An ANC coalition saw Ncane elected deputy-mayor. In June 2022, Ncane was ousted as deputy mayor, and replaced by a candidate from ANC coalition partner Abantu Batho Congress (ABC). Ncane quit his party, standing as a candidate for the Sizwe Ummah Nation (SUN) in the by-election. The seat was won by the Inkatha Freedom Party (IFP), which increased its share from 6% to 53%. Ncane got 31%, while the candidate from his previous party, AJ, got 1%.

== November 2026 election ==
The following table shows the results of the 2026 election.

Party	Ward			List			Total seats
Party	Votes	%	Seats	Votes	%	Seats	Total seats
uMkhonto weSizwe Party	9,116	34.83	5	9,320	35.66	3	8
African National Congress	8,857	33.84	6	8,924	34.15	1	7
Inkatha Freedom Party	5,282	20.18	0	5,180	19.82	4	4
Democratic Alliance	855	3.27	0	851	3.26	1	1
Economic Freedom Fighters	692	2.64	0	723	2.77	1	1
Al Jama-ah	306	1.17	0	273	1.04	0	0
African Transformation Movement	186	0.71	0	218	0.83	0	0
Freedom Front Plus	163	0.62	0	159	0.61	0	0
South African Communist Party	166	0.63	0	145	0.55	0	0
Afrika Mayibuye Movement	128	0.49	0	132	0.51	0	0
Independent candidates	208	0.79	0				0
Pan Africanist Congress of Azania	84	0.32	0	89	0.34	0	0
Patriotic Alliance	74	0.28	0	33	0.13	0	0
People's Freedom Party	48	0.18	0	45	0.17	0	0
African Christian Democratic Party				41	0.16	0	0
African Renaissance Unity	5	0.02	0				0
Total	26,170	100.00	11	26,133	100.00	10	21
Valid votes	26,170	98.11		26,133	98.18		
Invalid/blank votes	503	1.89		485	1.82		
Total votes	26,673	100.00		26,618	100.00		
Registered voters/turnout	52,138	51.16		52,138	51.05		
