= Stachys tysonii =

Conservation status
- Least Concern (SANBI Red List)

Scientific classification
- Kingdom: Plantae
- Clade: Tracheophytes
- Clade: Angiosperms
- Clade: Eudicots
- Clade: Asterids
- Order: Lamiales
- Family: Lamiaceae
- Genus: Stachys
- Species: S. tysonii

Binomial name
- Stachys tysonii Skan

Synonyms
- Stachys obtusifolia MacOwan var. angustifolia Skan

Species of shrub

Stachys tysonii is a species of hedgenettle found in South Africa and Lesotho.

== Description ==
It is a perennial herb 15–30 cm (5.9–11.8 in) tall, with few to several erect stems that often arise from a spreading base. The stems are sparsely branched and covered with both long, fine hairs and short gland-tipped hairs.

The leaves are borne on short stalks and are ovate to lanceolate, 15–35 mm (0.59–1.38 in) long. They usually have a deeply heart-shaped base, a rounded tip, and evenly scalloped to finely toothed margins. The upper surface is softly to stiffly hairy, while the downy underside typically shows numerous small gland dots.

The flowers are arranged in a spike that is loose near the base and denser towards the tip, with 4–6 flowers per whorl. The flowers are whitish to mauve. The calyx is glandular and hairy, and the two-lipped corolla has an upright upper lip and a downward-curving lower lip marked with darker flecks.

S. tysonii flowers from January to April.

=== Identification ===
It is closely related to S. obtusifolia, and the limits between the two are not yet entirely clear. However, S. tysonii can be distinguished by its longer petioles and more oblong cordate-based leaves, which are softly downy and freely gland-dotted underneath.

== Distribution and habitat ==
S. tysonii can be found in the Free State, Lesotho, KwaZulu-Natal, and the Eastern Cape, where it grows in montane grassland at 1,000–2,800 m (3,300–9,200 ft) in altitude.

== Etymology ==
The species is named for William Tyson (1851–1920), a teacher and highly active plant collector who came to South Africa from Jamaica in 1874. He collected the type specimen of the plant near Clydesdale in KwaZulu-Natal in the 1880s. Other taxa named in his honour are Dierama tysonii, Euryops tysonii, Jamesbrittenia tysonii, Scabiosa tysonii, and the genus Tysonia, since renamed Afrotysonia.

== See also ==
- List of Lamiaceae of South Africa
