= South African Class NG4 4-6-2T =

1911 narrow-gauge steam locomotive

NGR Class N 4-6-2T 1911 South African Class NG4 4-6-2T
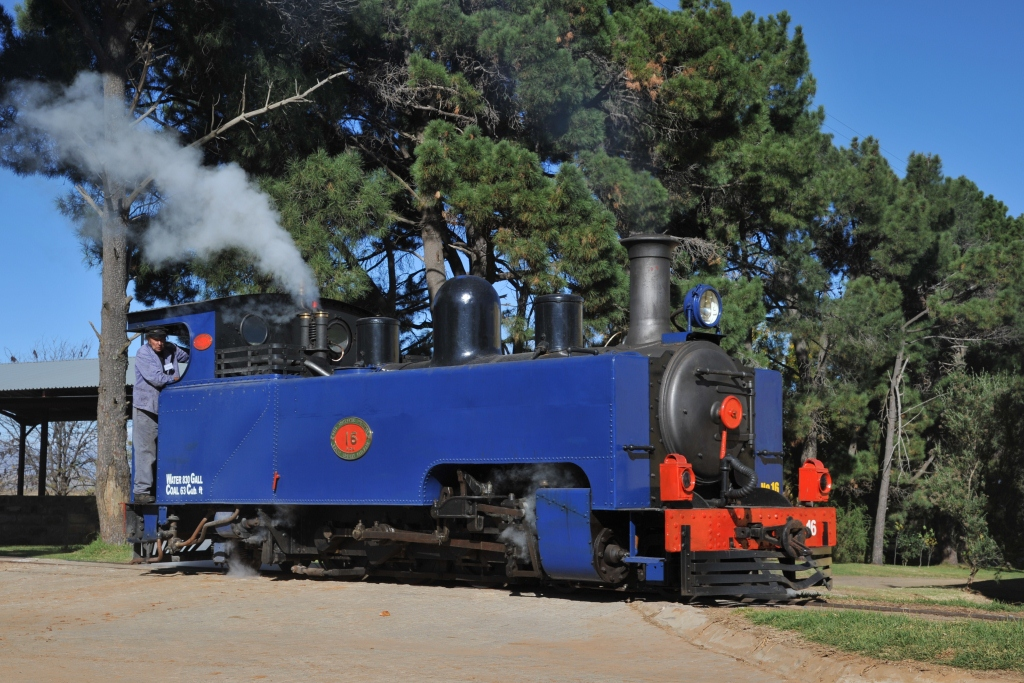
- No. NG16, restored at Sandstone Estates, 4 May 2013
Type and origin
- Power type: Steam
- Designer: Natal Government Railways (D.A. Hendrie)
- Builder: Kerr, Stuart and Company
- Serial number: 1207-1208, 1294-1295, 1342-1344
- Model: Kerr Stuart Side-tank
- Build date: 1911-1914
- Total produced: 7
Specifications
- Configuration
  - Whyte: 4-6-2T
  - UIC: 2'C1'n2t
- Driver: 2nd coupled axle
- Gauge: 2 ft (610 mm) narrow
- Leading dia.: 18 in (457 mm)
- Coupled dia.: 30 in (762 mm)
- Trailing dia.: 21 in (533 mm)
- Wheelbase: 17 ft 9 in (5,410 mm)
  - Leading: 3 ft 6 in (1,067 mm)
  - Coupled: 5 ft 9 in (1,753 mm)
- Length
  - Over couplers: 24 ft 11 in (7,595 mm)
- Height: 9 ft 4 1/2 in (2,858 mm)
- Frame type: Plate
- Axle load: 6 LT 3 cwt (6,249 kg)
  - Leading: 6 LT 19 cwt (7,062 kg)
  - 1st coupled: 6 LT (6,096 kg)
  - 2nd coupled: 6 LT 3 cwt (6,249 kg)
  - 3rd coupled: 6 LT 1 cwt (6,147 kg)
- Adhesive weight: 18 LT 4 cwt (18,490 kg)
- Loco weight: 29 LT 14 cwt (30,180 kg)
- Fuel type: Coal
- Fuel capacity: 21 long hundredweight 2 qtr (1.1 t)
- Water cap.: 820 imp gal (3,730 L)
- Firebox
  - Type: Belpaire
  - Grate area: 11 sq ft (1.0 m^{2})
- Boiler
  - Pitch: 4 ft 9 in (1,448 mm)
  - Diameter: 3 ft 3 1/2 in (1,003 mm)
  - Tube plates: 11 ft 2 1/8 in (3,407 mm)
  - Small tubes: 128: 1 3/4 in (44 mm)
- Boiler pressure: 165 psi (1,138 kPa)
- Safety valve: Ramsbottom
- Heating surface
  - Firebox: 45.5 sq ft (4.23 m^{2})
  - Tubes: 655.4 sq ft (60.89 m^{2})
  - Total surface: 700.9 sq ft (65.12 m^{2})
- Cylinders: Two
- Cylinder size: 11 1/2 in (292 mm) bore 15 in (381 mm) stroke
- Valve gear: Walschaerts
- Couplers: Johnston link-and-pin
Performance figures
- Tractive effort: 8,183 lbf (36.40 kN) @ 75%
Career
- Operators: Natal Government Railways; South African Railways
- Class: Class NG4
- Number in class: 7
- Numbers: NGR no. 10-11; SAR no. NG10-NG16
- Delivered: 1911-1914
- First run: 1911
- Withdrawn: 1948
- Preserved: No. NG16

The South African Railways Class NG4 4-6-2T of 1911 was a narrow-gauge steam locomotive from the pre-Union era in the Colony of Natal.

In 1911, shortly before being amalgamated into the South African Railways, the Natal Government Railways placed the first two of seven 4-6-2 Pacific type narrow-gauge tank steam locomotives in service. In 1912, when these two locomotives were assimilated into the South African Railways, they retained their engine numbers, but with an "NG" prefix added.

Five more of these locomotives were delivered to the South African Railways in 1913 and 1914. When a system of grouping narrow-gauge locomotives into classes was eventually introduced somewhere between 1928 and 1930, they were all designated Class NG4.

== Natal's narrow gauge ==
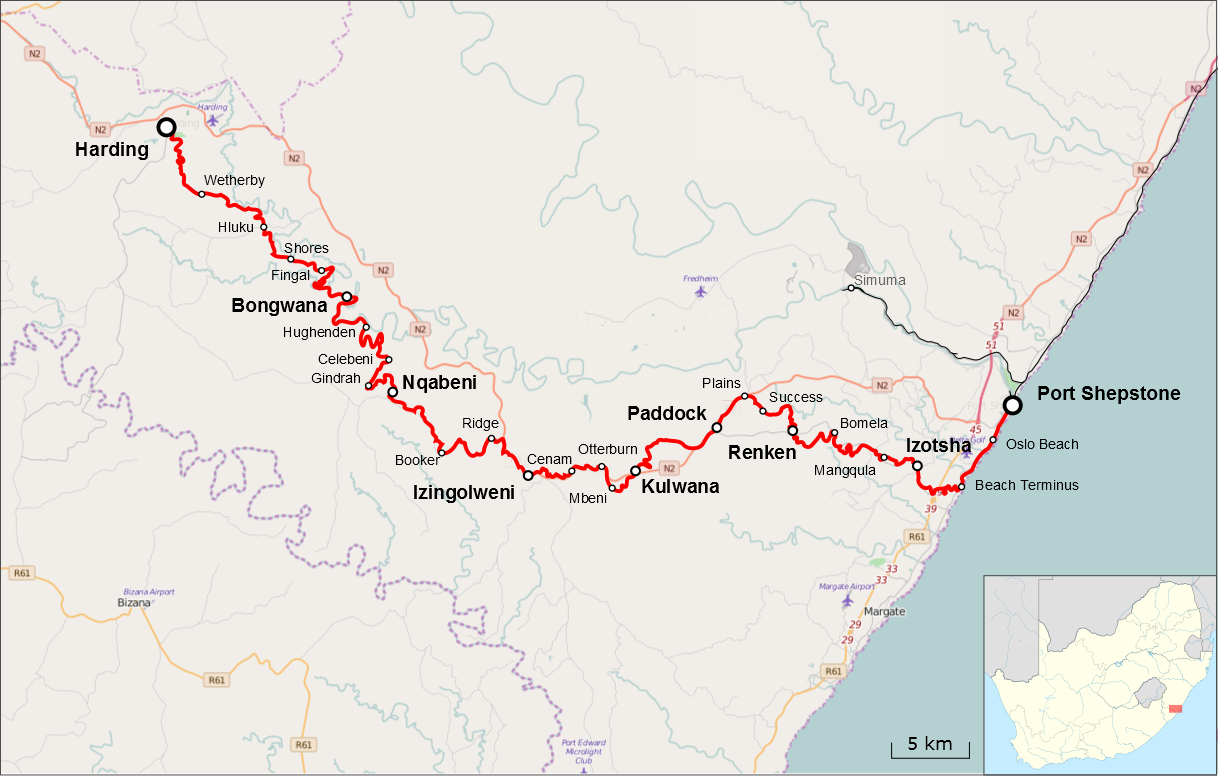
Alfred County railway

By 1906, the Natal Government had realised that light railways were essential as feeders to open up fertile districts which were distant from the existing main- and branch lines, particularly when the intervening stretches of country were difficult from an engineering point of view.

The third narrow-gauge railway line in Natal was the Alfred County Railway which ran from Port Shepstone on the South Coast to Harding. The first section to Paddock was opened on 8 November 1911.

== Manufacturers ==
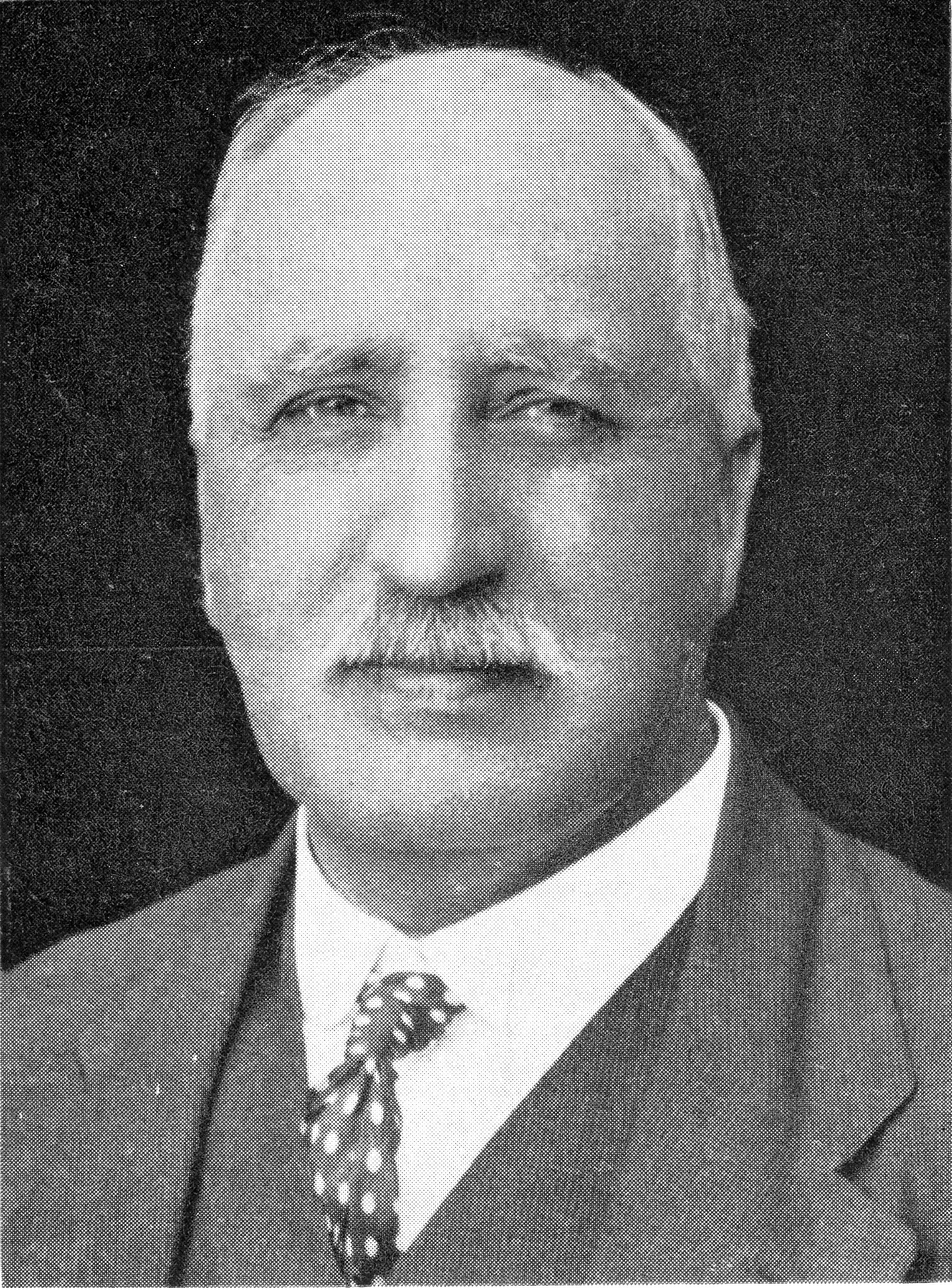
D.A. Hendrie

Like their two predecessor locomotive types, the Hunslet Side-tank of 1906 and the Hawthorn Leslie Side-tank of 1907, this third batch of narrow-gauge 4-6-2T Pacific locomotives of the Natal Government Railways (NGR) were also built to the design of NGR Locomotive Superintendent D.A. Hendrie, using the Hawthorn Leslie drawings for the Class NG3. The majority of their parts were interchangeable with those of the earlier engines.

Between 1911 and 1913, the High Commissioner for the Union of South Africa placed three orders for altogether seven of these locomotives with Kerr, Stuart and Company.

- Two locomotives were ordered on 10 January 1911. They were dispatched from the factory in September of that same year with Kerr, Stuart works numbers 1207 and 1208, for delivery to the Natal Government Railways. They were numbered NGR 10 and 11 and designated Class N on the NGR roster.
- Two more were ordered on 28 September 1912. They were dispatched from the factory in April and May 1913 with works numbers 1294 and 1295, for delivery to the South African Railways (SAR). They were numbered SAR NG12 and NG13.
- Three more were ordered on 10 June 1913. They were dispatched from the factory in July 1914 with works numbers 1342 to 1344. They were numbered SAR NG14 to NG16.

This last order also included the final two of the Class NG8 4-6-0 tender locomotives which were delivered with Kerr, Stuart works numbers 1345 and 1346.

== Characteristics ==
These locomotives were virtually identical to the Hawthorn Leslie Side Tanks, except for their boiler and firebox design. The boiler pitch had been raised from 4 feet 6 inches (1,372 millimetres) to 4 feet 9 inches (1,448 millimetres) to make a larger firebox possible. They had outside plate frames, Belpaire fireboxes and used Walschaerts valve gear.

The most obvious visual differences from the Hawthorn Leslie locomotives were the higher side tanks, the less ornate sand boxes on top of the boiler and the Belpaire firebox hump. As built, they had no headlamps, but some were later equipped with the large oil headlamps which were in use on the SAR at the time.

== Classification ==
When the Union of South Africa was established on 31 May 1910, the three Colonial government railways (Cape Government Railways, NGR and Central South African Railways) were united under a single administration to control and administer the railways, ports and harbours of the Union. Although the South African Railways and Harbours came into existence in 1910, the actual classification and renumbering of all the rolling stock of the three constituent railways were only implemented with effect from 1 January 1912.

In 1912, narrow-gauge locomotives were included in the SAR's narrow-gauge numbering scheme, but were not classified. They retained their existing engine numbers, but with an "NG" number prefix for narrow gauge. The two locomotives which had been delivered in 1911, listed as "Late Administration S.A.R. numbers 10 and 11" in the renumbering lists, were therefore renumbered NG10 and NG11.

The system of grouping SAR narrow-gauge locomotives into classes was only adopted somewhere between 1928 and 1930 and, at that point, these seven locomotives were designated Class NG4.

== Service ==
=== Railways ===
The Class NG4 was placed in service on the Alfred County Railway of which the first section to Paddock was opened on 8 November 1911, to work from Port Shepstone on the Natal South Coast to Harding. With the exception of no. NG12, all remained working on the three Natal narrow-gauge branches for their entire service lives.

=== First World War ===
In 1915, shortly after the outbreak of the First World War, the German South West Africa colony was occupied by the Union Defence Forces. Since a large part of the territory's railway infrastructure was destroyed or damaged by retreating German forces, an urgent need arose for locomotives for use on the narrow-gauge lines in that territory. In 1917, no. NG12 was transferred to the Defence Department for service in South West Africa. It returned to Natal after the war.

=== Industrial ===
No. NG11 was sold to the Savane Sawmills of Rhodesian Timber Concessions in 1942. The last one to remain in service, no. NG16, was sold to the Rustenburg Platinum Mines (RPM) in 1948, where it was renumbered to RPM no. 8.

== Preservation ==
No. NG16 is the only known survivor. RPM returned it to the SAR for preservation in 1969 or 1970, but it was only restored to working order after Sandstone Estates acquired it on 31 January 2003.

== Illustration ==
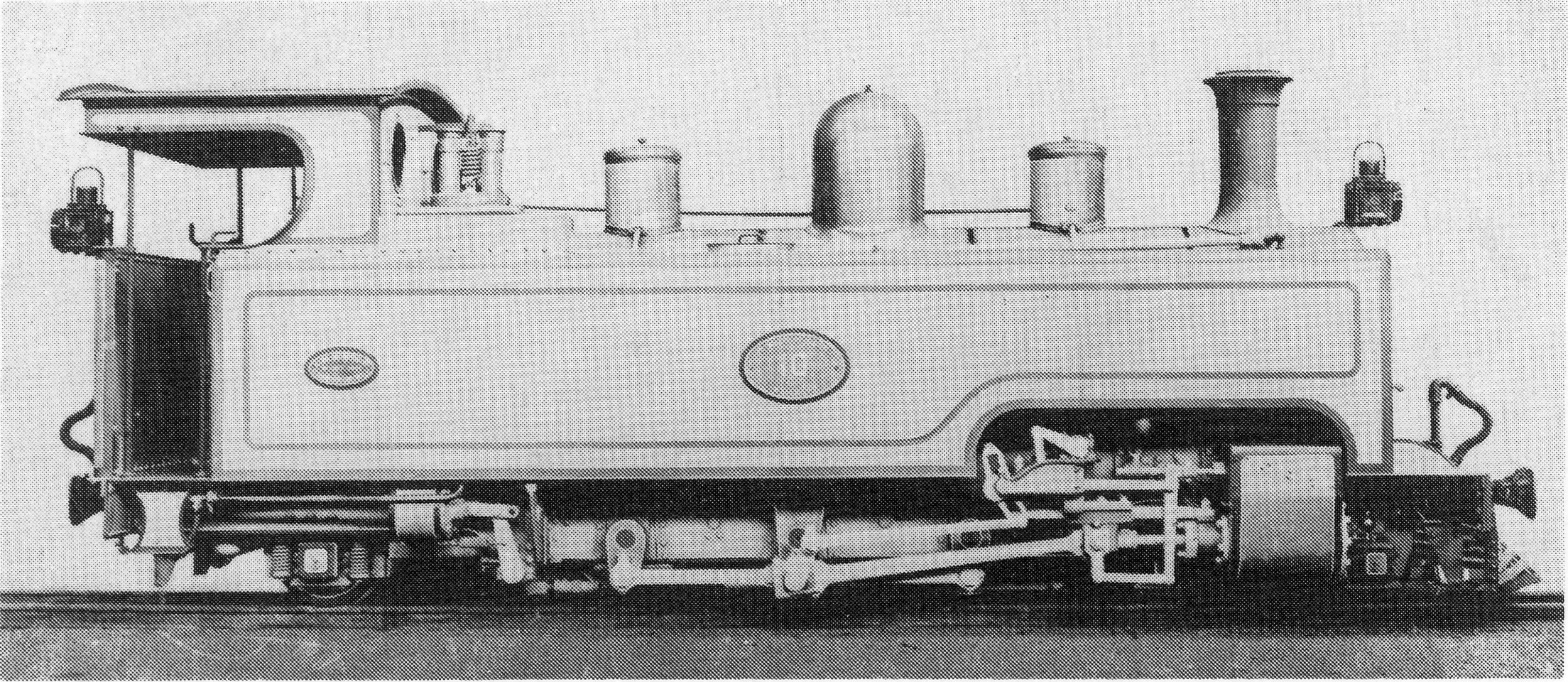
Kerr, Stuart and Company builder's picture of no. NG10, works no. 1207

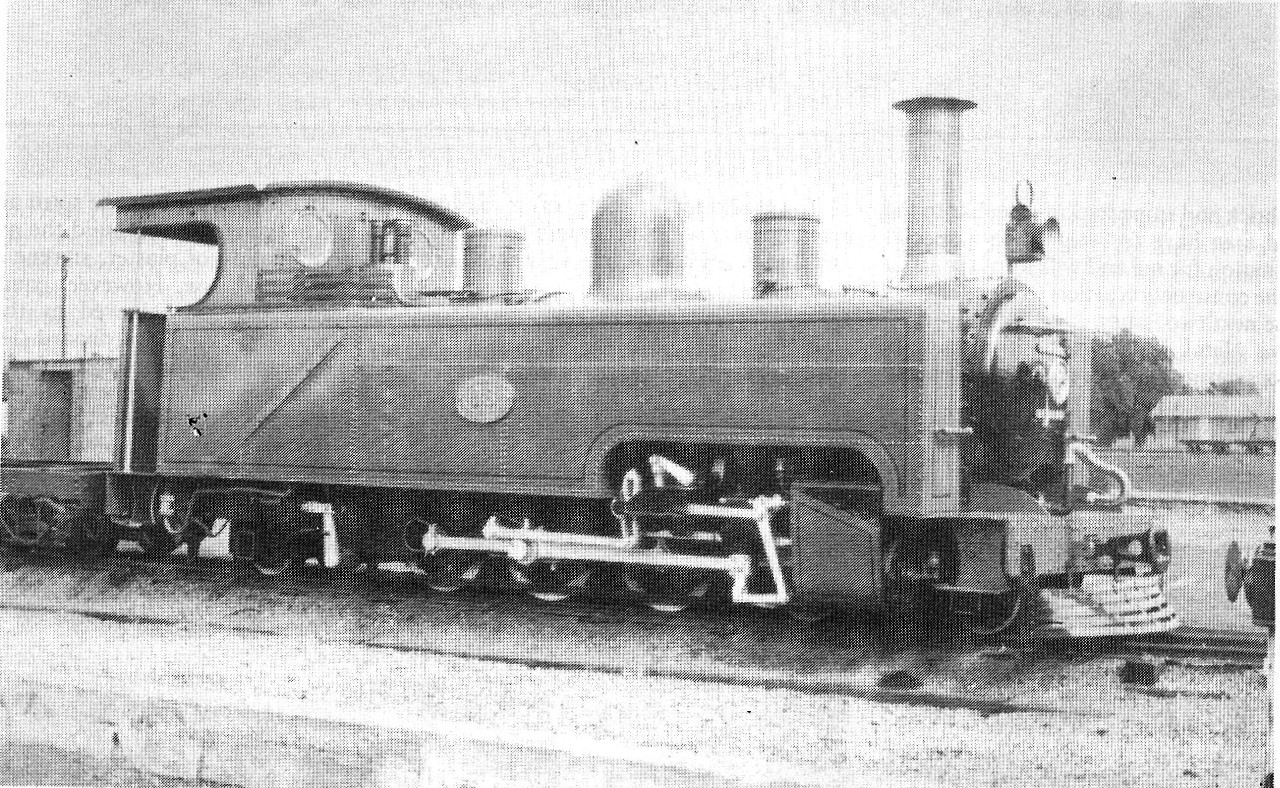
SAR Class NG4 no. NG16

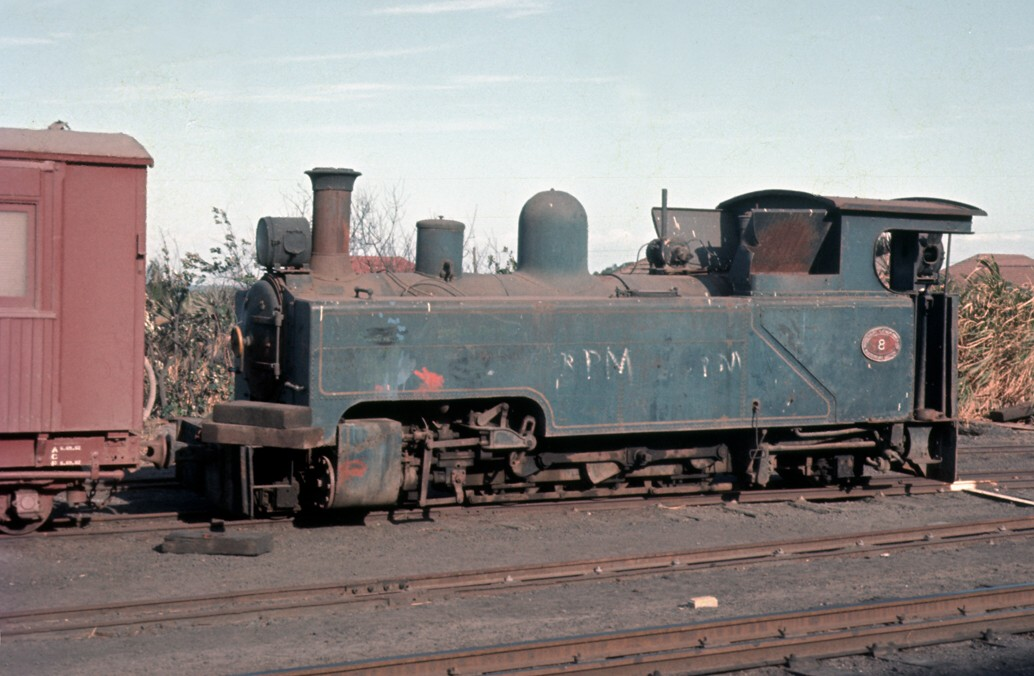
No. NG16, RPM no. 8, at Port Shepstone, 17 April 1970

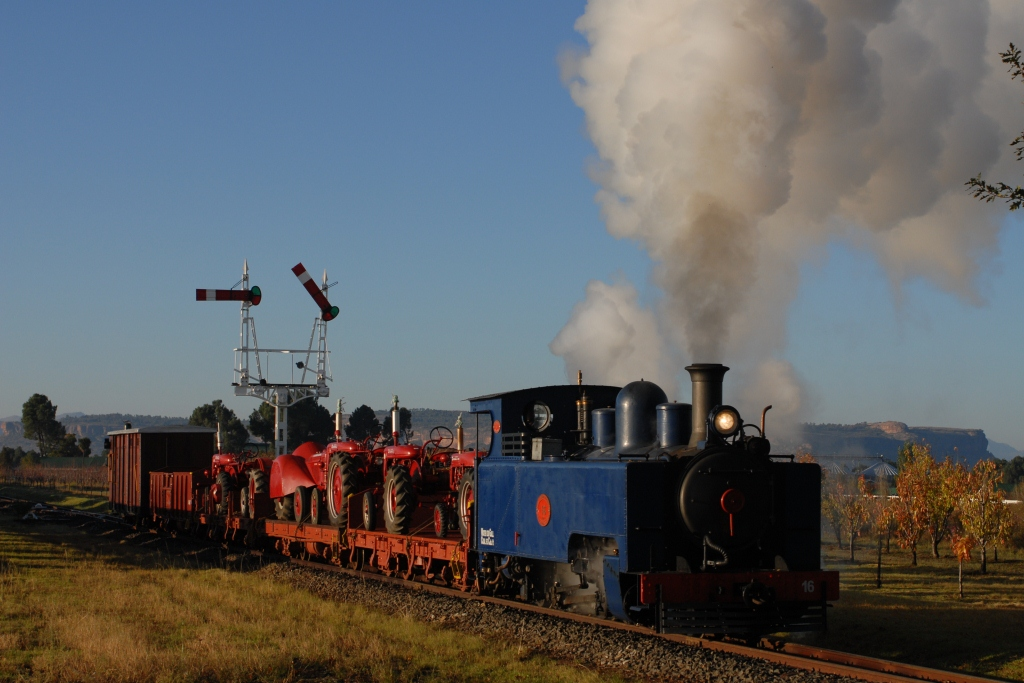
No. NG16, at work at Sandstone Estates, 22 April 2007
