= Nkosazana =

Nkosazana may refer to:

- Nkosazana Daughter (born 2000), South African singer
- Nkosazana Dlamini-Zuma (born 1949), South African politician and physician
- Dr Nkosazana Dlamini-Zuma Local Municipality, local municipality within the Harry Gwala District Municipality, in the KwaZulu-Natal province
