= Bulwer, KwaZulu-Natal =

Bulwer
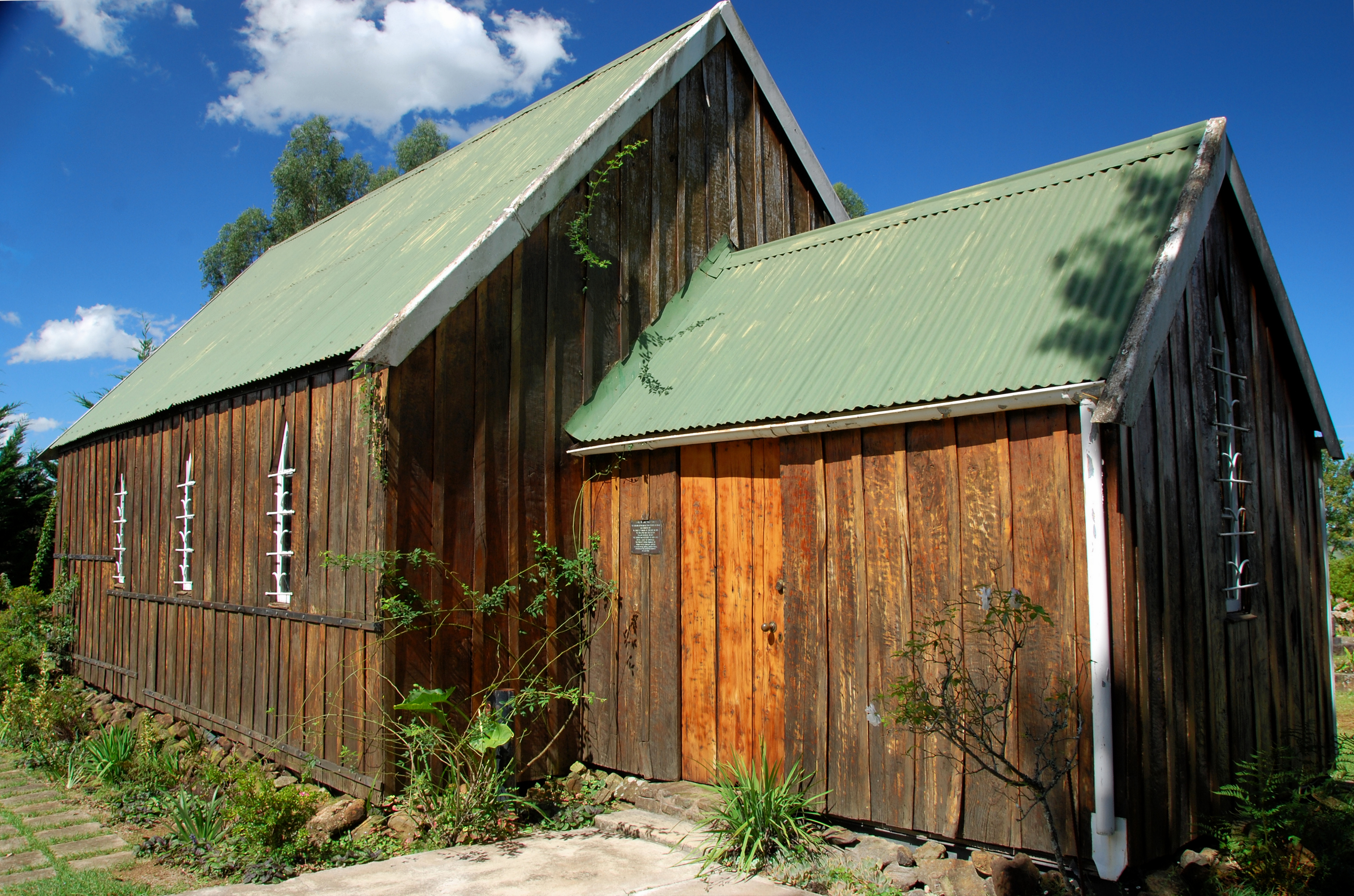
- The Old Yellowwood Church in Bulwer

- Location within KwaZulu-Natal Location within South Africa
- Coordinates: 29°48′S 29°46′E
- Country: South Africa
- Province: KwaZulu-Natal
- District: Harry Gwala
- Municipality: Dr Nkosazana Dlamini-Zuma Local Municipality

Area
  - Total: 12.70 km^{2} (4.90 sq mi)

Population (2011)
  - Total: 1,322
  - Density: 104.1/km^{2} (269.6/sq mi)

Racial makeup (2011)
  - Black African: 93.2%
  - Coloured: 0.3%
  - Indian/Asian: 0.6%
  - White: 5.1%
  - Other: 0.8%

First languages (2011)
  - Zulu: 89.2%
  - English: 6.9%
  - Xhosa: 1.1%
  - Other: 2.8%
- Time zone: UTC+2 (SAST)
- PO box: 3244
- Area code: 039

Bulwer is a small town in the KwaZulu-Natal's Midlands region, South Africa. It is situated on the R617 regional road between the towns of Boston and Underberg and around 50 minutes north-west of the town of Ixopo on the R56. The village is nestled in the shadow of the Amahwaqa (the misty one) mountain.

== Background ==
The town is named after Natal Governor Sir Henry Bulwer, having been founded during his tenure. Bulwer is a prominent tourist destination for various reasons. It's a popular birding spot, a beautiful place to just relax, but mainly it's a flying destination for both hang gliders and paragliders. Both local and international pilots flock to Bulwer for flying around the year.

== The Old Yellowwood Church ==
The old yellowwood church (Chapel of the Holy Trinity) in Bulwer was built from hand sawn yellowwood in 1885. It was renovated by Mondi in 1989.

== See also ==
Marutswa Forest, near Bulwer.
