= ANEW Hotels & Resorts =

South African hotel chain

- Industry: Hospitality
- Founded: 2017; 8 years ago
- Founder: Armour family
- Headquarters: Centurion, Gauteng, South Africa
- Number of locations: 16 hotels and resorts
- Area served: South Africa
- Key people: Clinton Armour (CEO)

ANEW Hotels & Resorts is a South African hotel chain headquartered in Centurion, Gauteng, South Africa. It includes 16 properties. It was founded in 2017 by Clinton Armour and his associates.

== Locations ==
- Ingeli Kokstad
