= Bisi, KwaZulu-Natal =

Bisi
- Location within KwaZulu-Natal Location within South Africa
- Coordinates: 30.412°S 29.894°E
- Country: South Africa
- Province: KwaZulu-Natal
- District: Harry Gwala
- Municipality: Umzimkhulu

Area
  - Total: 3.64 km^{2} (1.41 sq mi)

Population (2011)
  - Total: 2,967
  - Density: 815/km^{2} (2,110/sq mi)

Racial makeup (2011)
  - Black African: 98.2%
  - Coloured: 0.5%
  - Indian/Asian: 0.1%
  - White: 0.5%
  - Other: 0.7%

First languages (2011)
  - Xhosa: 54.1%
  - Zulu: 39.8%
  - English: 2.3%
  - Other: 3.7%
- Time zone: UTC+2 (SAST)

Bisi is a town in Umzimkhulu Local Municipality in the KwaZulu-Natal province of South Africa.
