= Ncwadi =

- Location within KwaZulu-Natal Location within South Africa
- Coordinates: 29.774°S 29.981°E
- Country: South Africa
- Province: KwaZulu-Natal
- District: Harry Gwala
- Municipality: Dr Nkosazana Dlamini-Zuma

Area
  - Total: 17.90 km^{2} (6.91 sq mi)

Population (2011)
  - Total: 2,199
  - Density: 122.8/km^{2} (318.2/sq mi)

Racial makeup (2011)
  - Black African: 99.9%

First languages (2011)
  - Zulu: 96.4%
  - English: 1.2%
  - Other: 2.4%
- Time zone: UTC+2 (SAST)
- PO box: 3226

Ncwadi is a town in Harry Gwala District Municipality in the KwaZulu-Natal province of South Africa.

Settlement on the Ncwadi River, a tributary of the Mkomazi, about 30 km south-west of Pietermaritzburg. Derived from Zulu, the name apparently means ‘conspicuous’, from a prominent hill.
