= Rietvlei =

- Location within KwaZulu-Natal Location within South Africa
- Coordinates: 30.487°S 29.832°E
- Country: South Africa
- Province: KwaZulu-Natal
- District: Harry Gwala
- Municipality: Umzimkhulu

Area
  - Total: 2.35 km^{2} (0.91 sq mi)

Population (2011)
  - Total: 2,509
  - Density: 1,070/km^{2} (2,770/sq mi)

Racial makeup (2011)
  - Black African: 96.9%
  - Coloured: 1.7%
  - Indian/Asian: 0.1%
  - White: 1.2%
  - Other: 0.2%

First languages (2011)
  - Xhosa: 66.1%
  - Zulu: 20.5%
  - English: 9.1%
  - Afrikaans: 1.5%
  - Other: 2.8%
- Time zone: UTC+2 (SAST)
- Postal code (street): 4686
- PO box: n/a
- Area code: 039

Rietvlei is a town in Harry Gwala District Municipality in the KwaZulu-Natal province of South Africa.
