= Umzimkhulu =

- Location within KwaZulu-Natal Location within South Africa
- Coordinates: 30.263°S 29.940°E
- Country: South Africa
- Province: KwaZulu-Natal
- District: Harry Gwala
- Municipality: Umzimkhulu
  - Councillor: (ANC)

Area
  - Total: 4.55 km^{2} (1.76 sq mi)

Population (2011)
  - Total: 8,399
  - Density: 1,850/km^{2} (4,780/sq mi)

Racial makeup (2011)
  - Black African: 95.1%
  - Coloured: 3.5%
  - Indian/Asian: 0.5%
  - Other: 0.9%

First languages (2011)
  - Zulu: 47.2%
  - Xhosa: 41.5%
  - English: 5.5%
  - Afrikaans: 1.3%
  - Other: 4.5%
- Time zone: UTC+2 (SAST)
- Postal code (street): 3297
- PO box: 3297
- Area code: 039

Umzimkhulu is a town in Harry Gwala District Municipality in the KwaZulu-Natal province of South Africa.

The town lies 243 km north-east of Mthatha, 18 km south-west of Ixopo, and 108 km south south-west of Pietermaritzburg, the provincial capital. It developed from a trading-post and was laid out in 1884. Takes its name from the Mzimkulu River on which it is situated; Zulu and Xhosa for 'big place', 'large home' of the waters.

Until 1 March 2006, the town was part of an exclave of the Eastern Cape, before being transferred to KwaZulu-Natal as part of the Twelfth Amendment of the Constitution of South Africa.

During the KwaZulu-Natal riots of July 2021, more than 50 people died in a furniture store in Umzimkhulu that was set on fire while looters were robbing it.

== Law and Government ==
Umzimkhulu is situated within the Umzimkhulu Local Municipality, forming part of the Harry Gwala District Municipality and functions as the municipal seat for the Umzimkhulu Local Municipality which governs Umzimkhulu, Rietvlei and its surroundings.

== Transport ==
Umzimkhulu lies on the R56 which connects the town with eXobho and Pietermaritzburg to the north-east and with Kokstad to the south-west.
