= Weza, South Africa =

Weza
- Location within KwaZulu-Natal Location within South Africa
- Coordinates: 30.592°S 29.746°E
- Country: South Africa
- Province: KwaZulu-Natal
- District: Ugu
- Municipality: UMuziwabantu

Area
  - Total: 2.03 km^{2} (0.78 sq mi)

Population (2011)
  - Total: 646
  - Density: 318/km^{2} (824/sq mi)

Racial makeup (2011)
  - Black African: 86.2%
  - Coloured: 2.6%
  - Indian/Asian: 2.6%
  - White: 8.2%
  - Other: 0.3%

First languages (2011)
  - Xhosa: 39.8%
  - Zulu: 35.6%
  - English: 8.9%
  - Afrikaans: 7.8%
  - Other: 8.1%
- Time zone: UTC+2 (SAST)
- PO box: 4685
- Area code: 039

Weza is a settlement in Ugu District Municipality in the KwaZulu-Natal province of South Africa.

Village some 20 km west of Harding and 50 km east of Kokstad. It takes its name from the Weza River, a northern tributary of the Mtamvuna River. Of Zulu origin, the name is said to mean 'to cause to cross over'.

The main business activity in Weza is the Hans Marensky saw mill that has been operational for more than 30years in the area. The Weza State forest close to town offers hiking trails and mountain biking trails. The forest is also home to the endangered Cape Parrot and other bird life.
