= Ingwe =

Ingwe may refer to:

- Ingwe, Zambia, part of the Kasempa constituency, in North-Western Province, Zambia
- Ingwe Local Municipality, KwaZulu-Natal, South Africa
- ZT3 Ingwe, a South African anti-tank guided missile
- Ingwe Coal Corporation; see Mick Davis
- The nickname for Kenyan Premier League club A.F.C. Leopards
- Ingwë, an elf in J. R. R. Tolkien's legendarium
- Ingwe, a piece for electric guitar by Georges Lentz
