= Kokstad =

Town in KwaZulu-Natal, South Africa

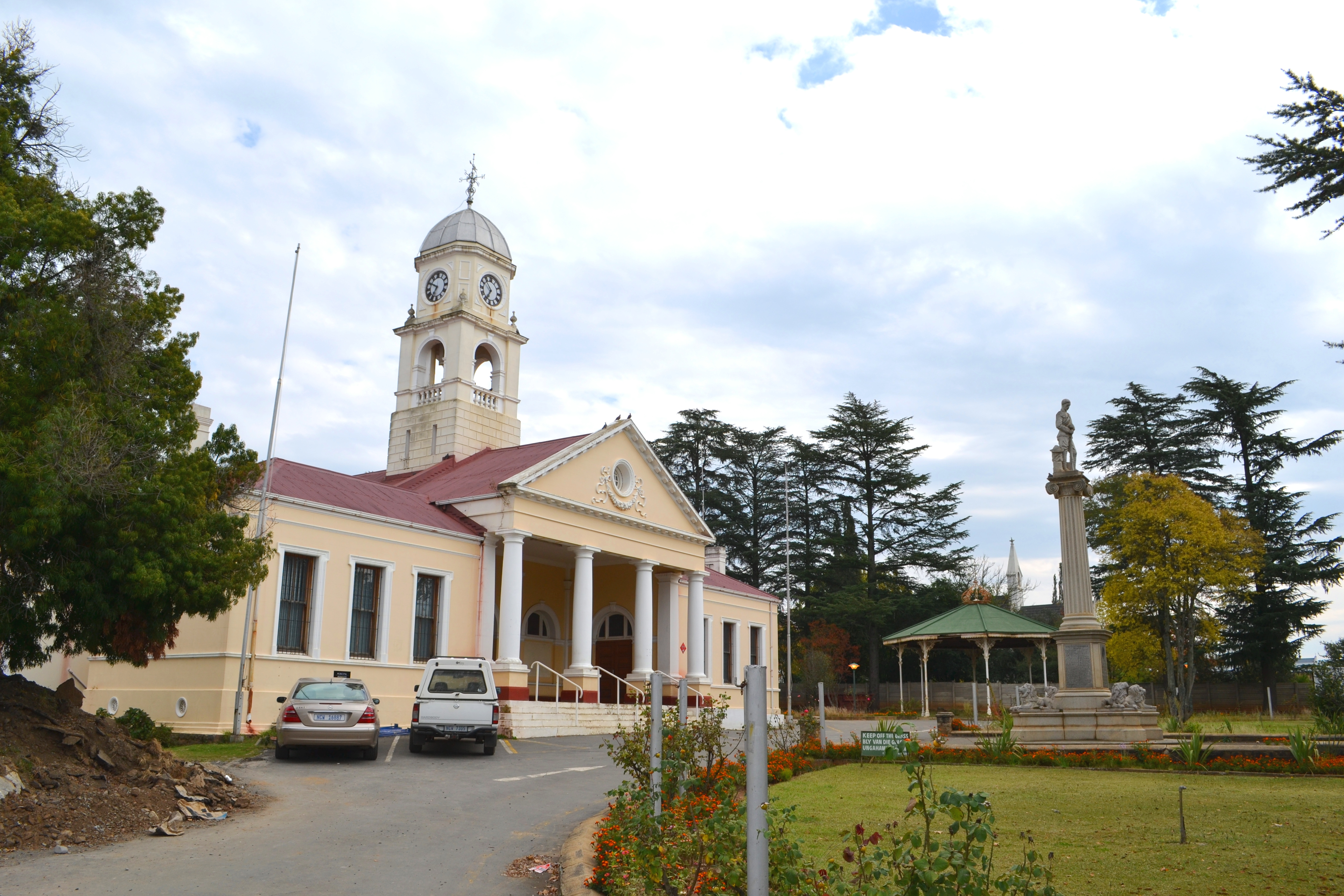
- Kokstad City Hall and Victorian Bandstand. Also visible is the Memorial to Cape Mounted Riflemen & Volunteers, East Griqualand.

- Location within KwaZulu-Natal Location within South Africa Location within Africa
- Coordinates: 30°33′14″S 29°25′37″E
- Country: South Africa
- Province: KwaZulu-Natal
- District: Harry Gwala
- Municipality: Greater Kokstad

Area
  - Total: 51.57 km^{2} (19.91 sq mi)
- Elevation: 1,302 m (4,272 ft)

Population (2011)
  - Total: 51,561
  - Density: 999.8/km^{2} (2,590/sq mi)

Racial makeup (2011)
  - Black African: 84.2%
  - Coloured: 5.9%
  - Indian/Asian: 3.8%
  - White: 5.8%
  - Other: 0.3%

First languages (2011)
  - Xhosa: 72.9%
  - English: 9.1%
  - Afrikaans: 6.8%
  - Zulu: 5.8%
  - Other: 5.5%
- Time zone: UTC+2 (SAST)
- Postal code (street): 4700
- PO box: 4700
- Area code: 039

Kokstad is a town in the Harry Gwala District Municipality of the KwaZulu-Natal Province, South Africa. Kokstad is named after the Griqua chief Adam Kok III who settled here in 1863. Kokstad is the capital town of the East Griqualand region, as it is also the biggest town in this region. It was built around Mount Currie, a local mountain range, by the town’s founder Adam Kok III, for whom the town is named. Stad is the Dutch and Afrikaans word for "city".

The town is built on the outer slopes of the Drakensberg and is 1,302 m above sea level. Behind it Mount Currie rises to a height of 2,224 m.

It is a centre for cheese and other dairy products.

Kokstad has the N2 Highway south of the town's CBD. The R56 leads from Kokstad to Cedarville (45 km), Matatiele (68 km) and Maluti leading to the border of Lesotho. The R617 is also a bisecting route leading from Kokstad to Underberg (109 km), Swartberg (41 km) and Bulwer (147 km).

The N2, the national route, leads from Kokstad to the east to Port Shepstone (175 km), Durban (380 km) and to the south Mount Ayliff (57 km), Mthatha (180 km), East London (419 km) and Qonce (447 km).

Kokstad is 10 km from the Eastern Cape border on the N2.

The majority of residents can speak IsiXhosa as well as IsiZulu.

Kokstad has no rural villages to date. It is a farming community with majority of its countryside land being cattle farms or residential farms.

== History ==
In 1820 the Griqua tribe which lived in Griquatown (in central South Africa) split and under the leadership of Adam Kok III, descendant of the former cook who established the tribe, one section first moved to Philippolis (southern Free State). In 1861 several hundred Griquas moved across the Drakensberg down the Ongeluks Nek to the vicinity of modern Kokstad. They moved because of the growing confrontation they faced with the Voortrekkers who had moved north of the Orange River to escape the laws of the British. The Voortrekkers, largely Dutch, secured leases over Griqua land and then refused to return the land at the end of the lease. The Big Hole of Kimberley was at the centre of controversy over one such lease.

The Griquas were forced to travel over the Drakensberg into a region earlier devastated by the great Zulu King, Shaka—thus its name "Nomansland". By the time the Griquas arrived in their new promised land eighteen months later they were exhausted and most of their livestock had perished. The impoverished Griquas named the mountain where they settled Mount Currie after Sir Walter Currie who gave support to their effort to settle here. Once settled their leader, Adam Kok, renamed their new land East Griqualand. Every male Griqua who settled in East Griqualand was able to secure a 3,000 acres (1,200 ha) farm, but most of them sold their land cheaply to white settlers and squandered their money. The Rev William Dower in his 1902 book The Early Annals of Kokstad describes in great detail how cheaply the Griqua gave their farms away.

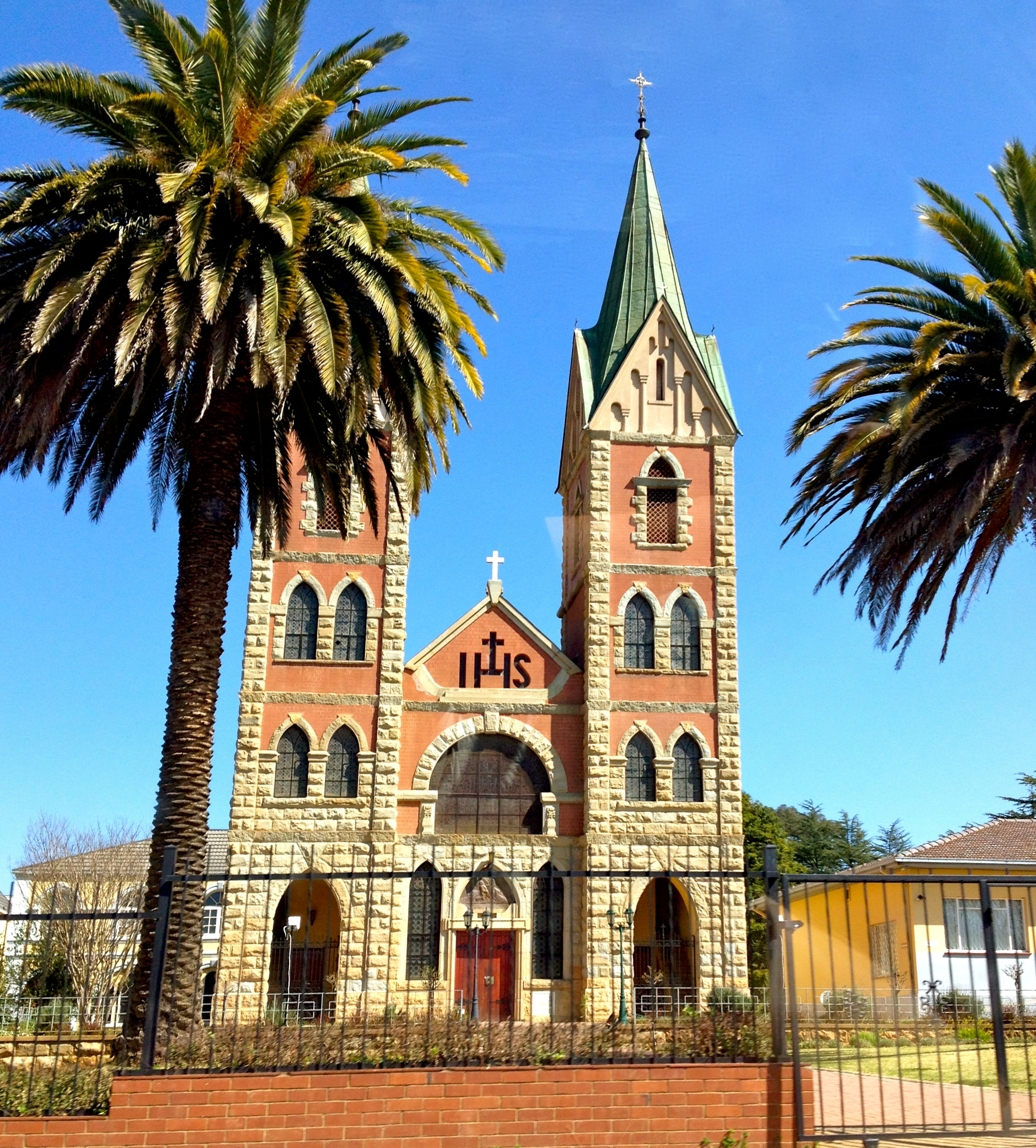
St Patricks Catholic Cathedral

When, in 1869, the Reverend William Dower was asked by the Griqua to establish a mission, he agreed on condition that they resettle in a more suitable place on the banks of the Mzimhlava river.

Two prominent European settlers George Brisley and Donald Strachan played a major role in the early development of Kokstad and East Griqualand: their trading store, Strachan and Co, in 1874 introduced South Africa's first indigenous currency—a set of trade tokens which circulated across a wide region, covering an area the size of Ireland.

Confirmation that the Strachan and Co coins circulated as money in the region at this time comes from the local Standard Bank at Kokstad and the managing director of Strachan and Co.

In 1878 East Griqualand came into the possession of Cape Colony. The first hotel in Kokstad, The Royal, was opened by an African-American who also started a newspaper (the Kokstad Advertiser) in 1881. Kokstad became a municipality in 1892. In 1904 the population was recorded at 2903 whom a third were Griquas. The town was transferred to Natal province in 1978. Today the population of Kokstad lies at just over 50,000 people.

== Cultural assets ==
Stemming from a relatively old farming community, Kokstad rose from the lands beneath Mount Currie. Many old buildings and monuments have been erected that are now considered to be National Heritage Sites.

- The Adam Kok Monument (Griqua): The monument commemorates the leadership of the Griqua, Adam Kok, who, after leading the Griquas from the Southern Free State to Griqualand East during the 1860s, died after a fall off a cart in 1875. The monument is situated next to the police station of Kokstad.
- Kokstad Bandstand (British Colonial): The ornamental, cast iron bandstand dates from 1912. It was donated to the town council by the engineers who were responsible for the Kokstad water scheme. It was declared a national monument in October 1983.
- Boy Scouts Monument (British Monument): The monument to former Boy Scouts who fell in the world wars is situated in the foothills of Mount Currie North of Kokstad.
- Cape Mounted Rifles Monument (British Colonial): The monumen is a tall column surrounded by four lions peering upwards. It is situated close to the town hall.
- St. Patrick's Catholic Church (Cathedral)
- East Griqualand Museum and Community Tourism Info Center: Griqua history is the main theme of this museum's display. Although it has several other local history exhibits and items also known as the Kokstad museum.
- Old town hall (historical building): The old town hall is considered a National Monument Site. It is one of the largest town structures that predates World War I within the surrounding areas. Currently used for ceremonial practices, it also functioned as the town's library for many years until 2005, when the new library on the neighbouring plot was opened. The town hall is now used for many municipal and political functions, as well as public gatherings ranging from weddings to sporting ceremonies.

== Attractions ==
The area is popular for its many rivers and dams that provide ample opportunity for trout fishing and hiking possibilities. There are three reserves, Mount Currie, Wilfred Bauer and the Mountain Lake Nature Reserve. These have camping and picnic spots. Among these reserves, the Mountain Lake Nature Reserve contains paths that provide sightseeing walks, as well as over 220 species of birds. The Mount Currie reserve is filled with history. On the site stands a historic laager site surrounded by graves of early pioneers and a monument pays homage to Boy Scouts who died during the First World War in East Africa.

The area's many dams provide multiple forms of use. Crystal Springs Dam provides many boating and angling opportunities. The dam is fed by the pure water of Crystal Springs, the main source of Kokstad's water supply. In 1924, William Mortimer Mail (b. 16 November 1885) was to take-up an appointment as the Kokstad Town Engineer, Arguably, Mail's most notable achievement was improvement to Kokstad's drinking water, which at the time of his arrival, was drawn from a mountain stream. Whenever it rained, it became heavily stained. After identifying a suitable spring further down the mountain (Crystal Springs), he first conducted a series of water flow rate metering, to establish there was sufficient flow to meet the town's needs. Once it had been proven there was sufficient flow, Mail then oversaw design and construction of a new water treatment plant. The new plant provided crystal clear water to Kokstad, which helped the town grow and flourish.

In addition to supplying drinking water to the town, the Crystal Spring Dam has become an attraction for both the Kokstad residents, and tourists to the area. There are three rural schemes located in nearby Swartberg, Franklin and Kransdraai, which meet the RDP level of service.

== Infrastructure ==
=== Education ===
Kokstad has many primary and secondary schools, as well as a tertiary institution college. Some of the main schooling institutions are as follows:

- Carl Malcomess High
- Mount Currie Senior Secondary School
- Seven Fountains Primary School
- Shayamoya High
- Kokstad Public Primary
- Kokstad Junior School
- Kokstad Primary School
- Kokstad College
- St. Patricks College (both primary and secondary)
- Esayidi TVET College

=== Healthcare ===
==== Public healthcare ====
East Griqualand & Usher Memorial Hospital is a 210-bed district public hospital situated north-west of the Kokstad CBD, along the R56 towards Matatiele. It mainly serves Kokstad and surrounding rural communities within the Greater Kokstad Local Municipality (such as Franklin and Swartberg), the neighbouring uMzimkhulu Local Municipality, nearby rural communities in the Eastern Cape Province such as Mount Ayliff, Ntabankulu, Mount Frere as well as the neighbouring country of Lesotho.

==== Private healthcare ====
Kokstad Private Hospital is the main private healthcare facility serving Kokstad, surrounding Southern KZN communities such as Harding, Umzimkhulu and Underberg as well as proximate Eastern Cape communities. Affiliated under the Netcare Group, one of South Africa’s largest private healthcare providers, it offers 24-hour emergency services. Conveniently situated on Barker Street, it lies in the heart of the Kokstad CBD.

== Coats of arms ==
=== Municipal (1) ===
By 1931, the Kokstad municipal council had assumed a pseudo-heraldic "coat of arms" depicting a landscape with Mount Currie in the background, ears of wheat, and a tree, and the motto Concilio et animis.

=== Municipal (2) ===
A proper coat of arms was designed by Ivan Mitford-Barberton in the late 1950s. It was registered with the Cape Provincial Administration in October 1960 and at the Bureau of Heraldry in July 1979.

The arms were : Per fess Gules and Or, in chief, dexter a Griqua hunter statant holding in his dexter hand a slain buck and in his sinister hand a rifle, sinister a lion statant, all Or; in base, below a yoke the barrel of a cannon palewise, all Sable; the whole within a bordure compony of 40 pieces Argent and Sable. In layman's terms, the shield was divided horizontally into red and gold, the upper half depicting a Griqua hunter holding a slain buck and a rifle and facing a lion, and the lower half a yoke above an upright black cannon barrel, the whole design surrounded by a border divided into forty sections alternately silver and black.

The crest was a cock's head issuing from a golden eastern crown, and the motto was Pro rege lege et grege.

== Literature ==
- Alan George Sumner Gibson: Eight Years in Kaffraria, 1882–1890. Wells Gardner, Darton & Co. 1891. Reprinted by Negro University Press, New York City 1969, ISBN 978-0-8371-1573-3.

== Notable people associated with Kokstad ==
- Ebbo Bastard, South Africa national rugby union team player
- Robert Dower, cricketer
- Trevor Fancutt, tennis player
- Rosa Hope, artist
- Khaya Majola, rugby union player
- Ivan Mitford-Barberton
- Dick Muir, rugby union player
- Wilfrid Napier, Roman Catholic cardinal
- Njongonkulu Ndungane, Anglican Bishop of Kimberley, Kuruman and Archbishop of Cape Town.
- Kelly Seymour, cricketer
- Zanele Situ, paralympian athlete
- Sir Walter Stanford, colonial-era magistrate
- Stan Schmidt, South African Shotokan karate master and the first non-Japanese karateka to attain 7th dan and 8th dan from the Japan Karate Association (JKA).
