= Dierama tysonii =

Scientific classification
- Kingdom: Plantae
- Clade: Tracheophytes
- Clade: Angiosperms
- Clade: Monocots
- Order: Asparagales
- Family: Iridaceae
- Genus: Dierama
- Species: D. tysonii

Binomial name
- Dierama tysonii N.E.Br.

Species of flowering plant

Dierama tysonii is a perennial geophyte that is part of the Iridaceae family. The species is endemic to South Africa. The plant occurs in KwaZulu-Natal and the Eastern Cape in Griqualand East. The species has a range of 2024 km^{2} and ten subpopulations are known. The plant has already lost habitat to plantations and crop cultivation. It is currently threatened by overgrazing.

== Etymology ==
The species is named for William Tyson (1851–1920), a teacher and highly active plant collector who came to South Africa from Jamaica in 1874. Other taxa named in his honour are Euryops tysonii, Jamesbrittenia tysonii, Salvia tysonii, and the genus Tysonia, since renamed Afrotysonia.
