= Greater Kokstad Local Municipality =

Greater Kokstad
- Local municipality
- Seal

- Location in KwaZulu-Natal
- Coordinates: 30°33′S 29°25′E
- Country: South Africa
- Province: KwaZulu-Natal
- District: Harry Gwala District
- Seat: Kokstad
- Wards: 10

Government
  - Type: Municipal council

Area
  - Total: 2,680 km^{2} (1,030 sq mi)

Population (2011)
  - Total: 65,981
  - Density: 24.6/km^{2} (63.8/sq mi)

Racial makeup (2011)
  - Black African: 87.1%
  - Coloured: 8.2%
  - Indian/Asian: 1.1%
  - White: 3.3%

First languages (2011)
  - Xhosa: 70.5%
  - English: 8.8%
  - Zulu: 7.5%
  - Afrikaans: 6.9%
  - Other: 6.3%
- Time zone: UTC+2 (SAST)
- Municipal code: KZN433

Greater Kokstad Municipality (Xhosa: uMasipala wase Greater Kokstad) is a local municipality within the Harry Gwala District Municipality, in the KwaZulu-Natal province of South Africa. Kokstad is derived from Dutch, meaning "town of Kok". It was named after Adam Kok III.

Kokstad serves as the service centre and commercial hub for most of East Griqualand and nearby parts of the Eastern Cape.

== Main places ==
The 2011 census for the Greater Kokstad Local Municipality states a population of 65,981 with these most populated main places:

Place	Code	Area (km^{2})	Population
Greater Kokstad NU	596002	2,611.04	9,926
Kokstad	596004	51.57	51,561
Franklin	596003	6.89	2,018
Full 2011 Census Report	596	2,679.82	65,981

== Politics ==
The municipal council consists of nineteen members elected by mixed-member proportional representation. Ten councillors are elected by first-past-the-post voting in ten wards, while the remaining nine are chosen from party lists so that the total number of party representatives is proportional to the number of votes received.

In the election of 4 November 2026 the African National Congress (ANC) won a reduced majority of eleven seats on the council.

The following table shows the results of the election.

Party	Ward			List			Total seats
Party	Votes	%	Seats	Votes	%	Seats	Total seats
African National Congress	11,735	47.48	11	11,737	47.22	0	11
uMkhonto weSizwe Party	5,420	21.93	0	5,519	22.21	4	4
Democratic Alliance	2,986	12.08	0	3,061	12.32	2	2
Economic Freedom Fighters	1,881	7.61	0	1,905	7.66	2	2
Patriotic Alliance	627	2.54	0	606	2.44	1	1
African Transformation Movement	461	1.87	0	464	1.87	1	1
7 other parties	1,608	6.51	0	1,562	6.28	0	0
Total	24,718	100.00	11	24,854	100.00	10	21
Valid votes	24,718	97.40		24,854	97.87		
Invalid/blank votes	659	2.60		540	2.13		
Total votes	25,377	100.00		25,394	100.00		
Registered voters/turnout	48,778	52.03		48,778	52.06		

== Mismanagement ==
The municipality commenced construction of a sports complex in 2017. As of March 2024, R55 million has been spent, and the complex is still incomplete, with a further tender having been announced. The ratepayers association stated that the municipality has wasted the money, as it is being constructed in a wetland against the wishes and warnings of the community.
