= Himeville =

Town in KwaZulu-Natal, South Africa

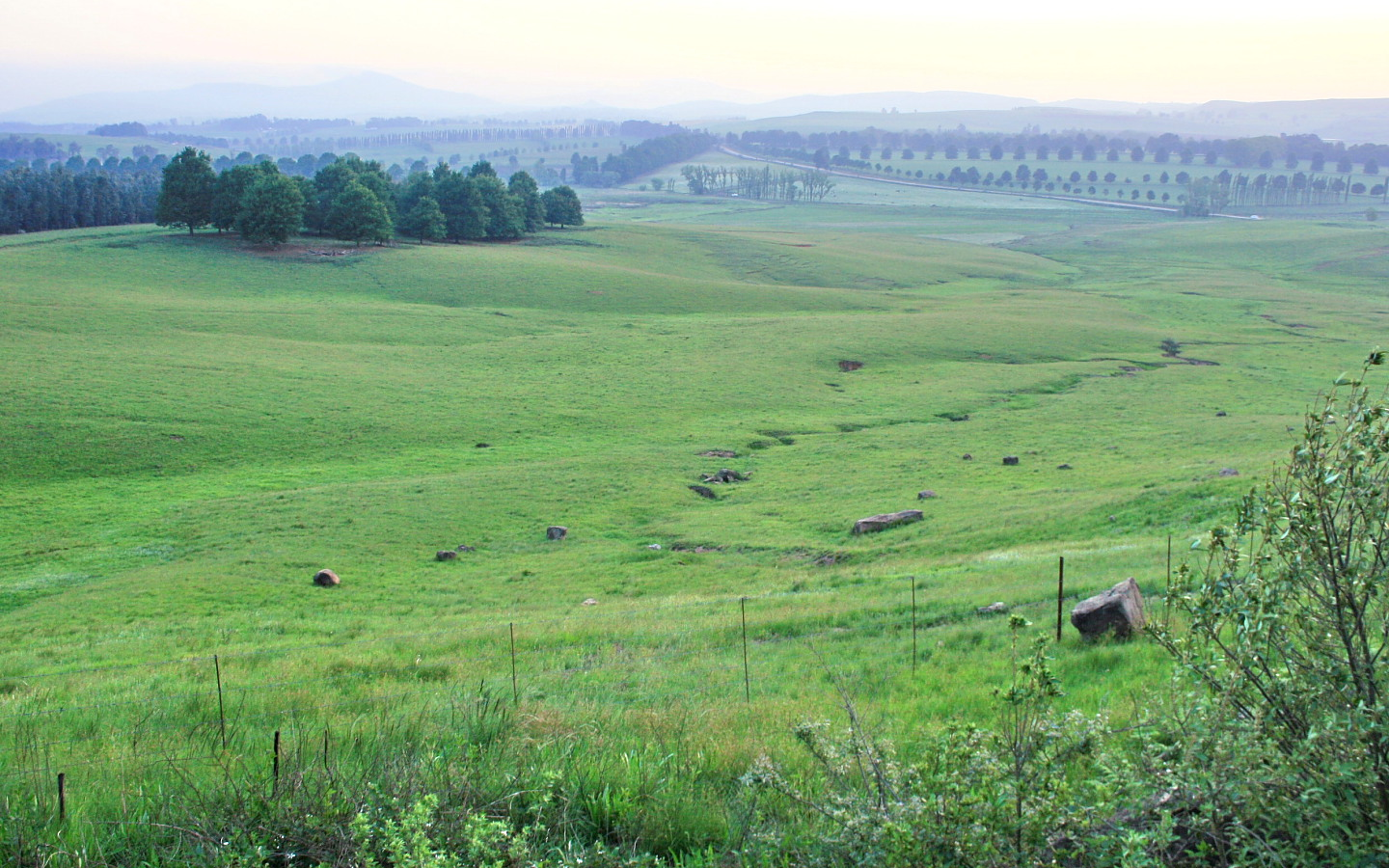

- Location within KwaZulu-Natal Location within South Africa
- Coordinates: 29°45′S 29°30′E
- Country: South Africa
- Province: KwaZulu-Natal
- District: Harry Gwala
- Municipality: Dr Nkosazana Dlamini-Zuma

Area
  - Total: 4.34 km^{2} (1.68 sq mi)

Population (2011)
  - Total: 1,697
  - Density: 391/km^{2} (1,010/sq mi)

Racial makeup (2011)
  - Black African: 83.5%
  - Coloured: 1.1%
  - Indian/Asian: 0.1%
  - White: 15.0%
  - Other: 0.3%

First languages (2011)
  - Zulu: 72.4%
  - English: 16.7%
  - Xhosa: 4.7%
  - Sotho: 2.4%
  - Other: 3.8%
- Time zone: UTC+2 (SAST)
- PO box: 3256
- Area code: 033

Himeville is a small village/town situated in the foothills of the Southern Drakensberg, KwaZulu-Natal, South Africa, approx 130 km from Pietermaritzburg on the route to the Sani Pass and the uKhahlamba Drakensberg Park (UNESCO World Heritage Site). Himeville is the closest town to the Sani Pass which links the town with Mokhotlong in Lesotho.

Himeville was named in 1902 after the then Prime Minister of Natal, Sir Albert Henry Hime, a road engineer elected as Prime Minister of Natal in 1889. The town was first established as a police outpost and a branch of the Border Mounted Rifles in 1890 following a spate of gun-running and cattle rustling in the area.

== Himeville Museum ==
The stone buildings which now comprise the Himeville Museum were built from 1896 to 1899 as the last of Natal's loop-holed forts. It was converted to a prison in 1902 and continued housing prisoners until 1972. An open-air exhibition of settler and agricultural history is surrounded by many display rooms housing themed exhibits. The prison warders house is decorated in the style of the early 20th century.

Covering the Bulwer, Underberg and Himeville communities, it commemorates the way of life of all the erstwhile inhabitants of the last frontier of Natal and has fairly extensive archives.

The Himeville Museum is one of the top rural museums in the country due to its wide range of exhibits. From fossils and stone age artifacts to a comprehensive display on the Bushmen, the early settlers as well as African beadwork and artifacts.

The display also cover the Anglo Boer War and the two World Wars. There is an old post office and a school room, wild life display and many farming implements and machinery including a blacksmiths forge and a workshop.

The museum is housed in the old stone fort or laager started in 1896 by the Border Mounted Rifles sent to police the area after the LeFleur Rebellion of 1895. Completed in 1899 it was only used once on the strength of a rumour and no fighting took place nearby. It was taken over by the Natal Mounted Police after the Anglo Boer War and turned into a prison by the addition of the warders house and magistrates court along with a number of cells. Abandoned as a prison in 1972 it became a museum in 1976 and was declared a National Monument in 1981. It is now affiliated to the KZN Provincial Museum Service.

== Himeville Old Residency ==
Located on the corner of Arbuckle and Clayton streets, Himeville, built in 1898 and until recently in constant use as the Magistrate's residence since construction.

== Himeville Nature Reserve ==
The reserve stretches along the eastern boundary of Himeville Village and was proclaimed to its present size of 104 ha in 1973. There are a couple of species of antelopes, and birds on the small dams.
