= Marutswa Forest =

Forest in South Africa

Coordinates: 29°48.465′S 29°47.053′E

Location of Bulwer, KwaZulu-Natal

Marutswa Forest is an indigenous mist-belt forest near Bulwer in the Midlands of KwaZulu-Natal region of South Africa.

== Animals ==
Attracted to forest habitats, bushbuck and reedbuck are frequent visitors to the forest, as are a herd of bush pigs that freely forage. Rock dassies have been seen and the call of the tree dassie has also been heard in the forest. Very recently mongooses were also seen around the forest boardwalk. Natal dwarf chameleons and several species of butterfly such as the emperor swallowtail can also be found.

Marutswa Forest has been described by some of South Africa's top birding tour operators as one of the most active cloud forests in KwaZulu-Natal. The forest is home to a vast number of rare birds. Cape parrots, which are endangered and dwindling in numbers in South Africa, are attracted by the seeds and the nesting potential of the plentiful yellow wood trees and are often found in flocks of up to 100 birds in the forest. Other birds in the area include orange ground-thrush, African crowned eagle, bush blackcap, white-starred robin, buff-spotted flufftail, Narina trogon, grey cuckooshrike, yellow-throated woodland warbler, crowned and southern ground hornbill.

== Plants ==
Within the forest there are many very large and old yellowwoods of about the same age and size, surviving simultaneously because they were too small to harvest for logging during the late 19th century. On the upper contour of the walk old vines are present.

Other species of trees include cabbage trees, white ironwood (Vepris lanceolata), knobthorn (Senegalia nigrescens), black stinkwood, sneezewood, lemonwood, wild currant, wild quince and tree fuchsia (Halleria lucida).

The forest hosts a rich selection of wild plants and grasses including; a large variety of ferns, wild lilies including the spectacular paintbrush lily (Scadoxus puniceus, ground and tree orchids, wild dagga and wild iris.

== Boardwalk ==
The Marutswa Forest Trail & Boardwalk, located close to the country village of Bulwer on the R617, is a joint initiative between the SappiWWF TreeRoutes Partnership, the Bulwer Biosphere group, the BirdLife South Africa, the Southern KZN Birding Route, and local conservation groups. They have incorporated the site into the route.

The project provided jobs for local community members as custodians of the project, as well as a welcome platform for local crafters to sell their original and unusual handicrafts.

The Forest

The site comprises a network of arterial trails leading into the indigenous forest, where there are a number of lookout jetties, boardwalk sections, picnic sites, decks, and viewpoints, allowing visitors to view the various layers of the forest, including the canopy.

== Nursery and craft and coffee shop ==
The forest has an indigenous nursery selling plants and tree saplings. The Marustwa craft shop sells items made by crafters from the surrounding communities, including baskets, pots, wire, and woven gifts as well as jewelry and carvings.
