= UMuziwabantu Local Municipality =

Coordinates: 30°45′S 30°26′E

uMuziwabantu
- Local municipality
- Seal

- Location in KwaZulu-Natal
- Country: South Africa
- Province: KwaZulu-Natal
- District: Ugu
- Seat: Harding
- Wards: 10

Government
  - Type: Municipal council
  - Mayor: Mzwandile Nyathi

Area
  - Total: 1,089 km^{2} (420 sq mi)

Population (2011)
  - Total: 96,556
  - Density: 88.66/km^{2} (229.6/sq mi)

Racial makeup (2011)
  - Black African: 97.9%
  - Coloured: 1.1%
  - Indian/Asian: 0.4%
  - White: 0.5%

First languages (2011)
  - Zulu: 88.2%
  - Xhosa: 4.9%
  - English: 2.9%
  - Southern Ndebele: 1.3%
  - Other: 2.7%
- Time zone: UTC+2 (SAST)
- Municipal code: KZN214

uMuziwabantu Municipality (Zulu: UMasipala woMuziwabantu) is a local municipality within the Ugu District Municipality, in the KwaZulu-Natal province of South Africa. uMuziwabantu is an isiZulu word meaning "the people's home", or "a home with wide open doors where everyone is welcome". The main source of income for the area is derived from the municipality's extensive wattle, gum, pine and poplar plantations, and associated industries, including saw mills and furniture-making factories.

== Main places ==
The 2001 census divided the municipality into the following main places:

Place	Code	Area (km^{2})	Population
Dlamini	50401	100.82	7,802
Duma	50402	23.22	2,303
Harding	50403	32.63	5,236
Machi	50404	19.47	2,932
Machi/Zibonda	50405	206.63	47,252
Mbotho	50406	61.6	6,634
Nhlangano	50407	89.85	14,395
Nyuswa	50408	2	66
Quebela	50409	0.77	1,110
Shwawu	50410	4.74	1,069
Weza	50412	1.03	579
Remainder of the municipality	50411	545.76	2,971

== Politics ==
The municipal council consists of twenty-one members elected by mixed-member proportional representation. Eleven councillors are elected by first-past-the-post voting in eleven wards, while the remaining eleven are chosen from party lists so that the total number of party representatives is proportional to the number of votes received.

In the election of 4 November 2026, no party won a majority. The uMkhonto weSizwe Party won the largest number of seats on the council, with eight.

The following table shows the results of the election.

Party	Ward			List			Total seats
Party	Votes	%	Seats	Votes	%	Seats	Total seats
uMkhonto weSizwe Party	9,116	34.83	5	9,320	35.66	3	8
African National Congress	8,857	33.84	6	8,924	34.15	1	7
Inkatha Freedom Party	5,282	20.18	0	5,180	19.82	4	4
Democratic Alliance	855	3.27	0	851	3.26	1	1
Economic Freedom Fighters	692	2.64	0	723	2.77	1	1
Independent candidates	208	0.79	0				0
10 other parties	1,160	4.43	0	1,135	4.34	0	0
Total	26,170	100.00	11	26,133	100.00	10	21
Valid votes	26,170	98.11		26,133	98.18		
Invalid/blank votes	503	1.89		485	1.82		
Total votes	26,673	100.00		26,618	100.00		
Registered voters/turnout	52,138	51.16		52,138	51.05		
