= Creighton, KwaZulu-Natal =

Creighton
- Location within KwaZulu-Natal Location within South Africa
- Coordinates: 30.028°S 29.840°E
- Country: South Africa
- Province: KwaZulu-Natal
- District: Harry Gwala
- Municipality: Dr Nkosazana Dlamini-Zuma

Area
  - Total: 2.36 km^{2} (0.91 sq mi)

Population (2011)
  - Total: 899
  - Density: 381/km^{2} (987/sq mi)

Racial makeup (2011)
  - Black African: 83.5%
  - Coloured: 5.1%
  - Indian/Asian: 1.6%
  - White: 9.6%
  - Other: 0.2%

First languages (2011)
  - Zulu: 71.4%
  - English: 14.8%
  - Xhosa: 5.4%
  - Afrikaans: 4.6%
  - Other: 3.8%
- Time zone: UTC+2 (SAST)
- PO box: 3263
- Area code: 039

Creighton is a settlement in Harry Gwala District Municipality in the KwaZulu-Natal province of South Africa.

Village 35 km northwest of Ixopo. Laid out in 1865, it has been administered by a Health Committee since 1947. It was named after Lady McCullum (née Creighton), wife of Sir Henry McCullum, Governor of Natal from 1901 to 1907. The first murder to take place here on record was that of Richard Butcher in 2008.
