= Clydesdale, KwaZulu-Natal =

Clydesdale
- Location within KwaZulu-Natal Location within South Africa
- Coordinates: 30.299°S 29.940°E
- Country: South Africa
- Province: KwaZulu-Natal
- District: Harry Gwala
- Municipality: Umzimkhulu

Area
  - Total: 5.59 km^{2} (2.16 sq mi)

Population (2011)
  - Total: 6,127
  - Density: 1,100/km^{2} (2,840/sq mi)

Racial makeup (2011)
  - Black African: 98.5%
  - Coloured: 1.2%
  - Other: 0.2%

First languages (2011)
  - Zulu: 51.1%
  - Xhosa: 44.1%
  - English: 1.5%
  - Other: 3.3%
- Time zone: UTC+2 (SAST)
- Postal code (street): n/a

Clydesdale is a town in Harry Gwala District Municipality in the KwaZulu-Natal province of South Africa.
