= Harding, South Africa =

Harding
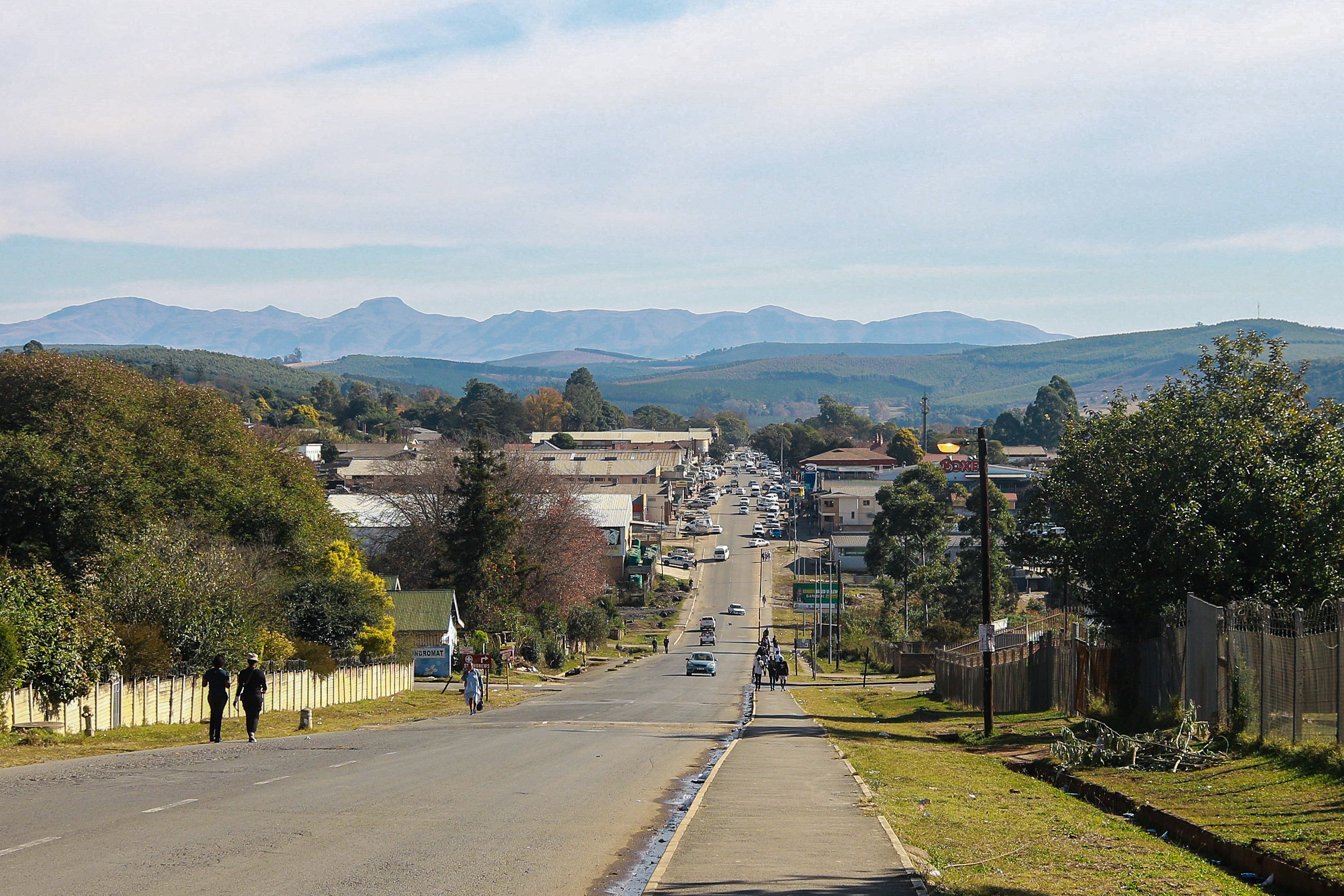

- Location within KwaZulu-Natal Location within South Africa
- Coordinates: 30°35′S 29°53′E
- Country: South Africa
- Province: KwaZulu-Natal
- District: Ugu
- Municipality: uMuziwabantu

Area
  - Total: 25.18 km^{2} (9.72 sq mi)

Population (2011)
  - Total: 9,544
  - Density: 379.0/km^{2} (981.7/sq mi)

Racial makeup (2023)
  - Black African: 77.3%
  - Coloured: 19.5%
  - Indian/Asian: 11.3%
  - White: 3.1%
  - Other: 2.8%

First languages (2023)
  - Zulu: 57.4%
  - Xhosa: 36.6%
  - English: 12.6%
  - Afrikaans: 3.8%
  - Other: 4.7%
- Time zone: UTC+2 (SAST)
- Postal code (street): 4680
- PO box: 4680
- Area code: 039

Harding is a town situated in the Mzimkulwana River Valley on the South Coast of KwaZulu-Natal, South Africa.

== History ==
Harding was established as a military outpost following the British annexation of East Griqualand in 1874. Named after Sir Walter Harding (c. 1812–1874) who in 1858 became the first Chief Justice in Natal. It was declared as a township in 1911.

== Geography ==
Harding lies at the foot of the Ingeli Range, 58 kilometres (36 mi) east of Kokstad, 34 kilometres (21 mi) north-west of Izingolweni, and 84 kilometres (52 mi) north-west of Port Shepstone.

== Economy ==
Timber and dairy farming form the backbone of the local economy, with extensive timber plantations surrounding Harding and the nearby town of Weza, located approximately 16 km to the south-west.

The abandoned 122 kilometres (76 mi) narrow gauge Alfred County Railway used to serve the farming areas, linking Harding with Port Shepstone.

== Law and government ==
Harding is situated in the uMuziwabantu Local Municipality, forming part of the Ugu District Municipality and functions as the municipal seat for the uMuziwabantu Local Municipality which governs Harding, Weza and its surroundings.

== Healthcare ==
St Andrews Hospital is a 210-bed district hospital situated east of the Harding CBD, that mainly serves the Harding, Weza and surrounding rural communities within the uMuziwabantu Local Municipality and in the neighbouring uMzimkhulu Local Municipality as well as nearby rural communities in the Eastern Cape Province such as Mbizana.

== Transport ==
=== Roads ===
Harding is bypassed by the N2, routing traffic heading east from Kokstad towards Izingolweni and Port Shepstone. The town can be accessed by turning off the N2 onto three main access points, namely Murchison Street (from the east and west) and Hawkins Street (from the north). Hawkins Street continues further south towards Mbizana in the Eastern Cape as a small rural road named the P59.
