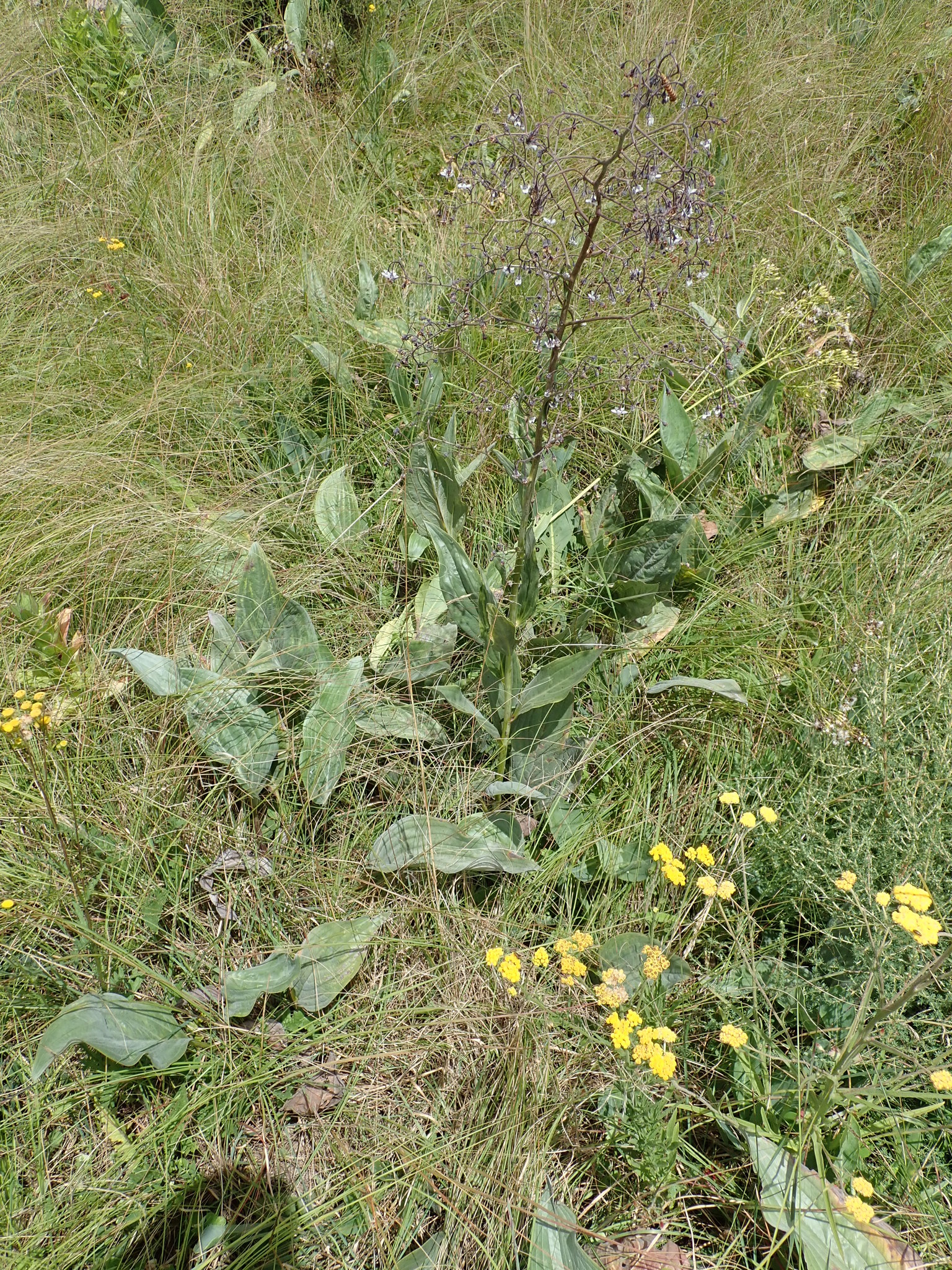
- Afrotysonia glochidiata

Scientific classification
- Kingdom: Plantae
- Clade: Tracheophytes
- Clade: Angiosperms
- Clade: Eudicots
- Clade: Asterids
- Order: Boraginales
- Family: Boraginaceae
- Genus: Afrotysonia; Rauschert (1983)

Synonyms
- Tysonia Bolus (1890), nom. illeg.

= Afrotysonia =

Genus of flowering plants

Afrotysonia is a genus of flowering plants belonging to the family Boraginaceae.

Its native range is Eastern Tropical and Southern Africa.

Species:

- Afrotysonia africana (Bolus) Rauschert
- Afrotysonia glochidiata (R.R.Mill) R.Mill
- Afrotysonia pilosicaulis R.R.Mill
