= Umzimkhulu Local Municipality =

Coordinates: 30°15′45″S 29°55′15″E

Umzimkhulu
- Local municipality
- Seal

- Location in KwaZulu-Natal
- Country: South Africa
- Province: KwaZulu-Natal
- District: Harry Gwala
- Seat: Umzimkhulu
- Wards: 22

Government
  - Type: Municipal council

Area
  - Total: 2,435 km^{2} (940 sq mi)

Population (2011)
  - Total: 180,302
  - Density: 74.05/km^{2} (191.8/sq mi)

Racial makeup (2011)
  - Black African: 99.3%
  - Coloured: 0.3%
  - Indian/Asian: 0.1%
  - White: 0.1%

First languages (2011)
  - Zulu: 47.3%
  - Xhosa: 46.3%
  - English: 1.6%
  - Other: 4.8%
- Time zone: UTC+2 (SAST)
- Municipal code: KZN435

Umzimkhulu Municipality (Zulu: UMasipala wase Mzimkhulu; Xhosa: uMasipala wase Mzimkhulu) is a local municipality within the Harry Gwala District Municipality, in the KwaZulu-Natal province of South Africa. Umzimkhulu is an isiXhosa and isiZulu word meaning "big/great house". Prior to the Twelfth Amendment of the Constitution of South Africa in 2005, confirmed by the Thirteenth in 2007, it was part of the Eastern Cape.

About 90.8% of the population reside in rural areas, while the remaining 9.2% are urban-based. The municipality faces severe backlogs with respect to water, sanitation and electricity provision. In addition, road infrastructure remains poor and provides only limited access to the area.

== Main places ==
The 2001 census divided the municipality into the following main places:

| Place | Code | Area (km^{2}) | Population |
|---|---|---|---|
| Bisi | 23701 | 0.64 | 57 |
| Clydesdale | 23702 | 2.43 | 1,774 |
| Dumakude | 23703 | 178.10 | 10,252 |
| Fodo | 23704 | 237.33 | 17,311 |
| Ibisi | 23705 | 2.56 | 2,442 |
| Indawana | 23706 | 231.34 | 18,411 |
| Jogilizwe | 23707 | 39.00 | 5,222 |
| Jongilizwe | 23708 | 19.44 | 3,004 |
| Ladamu | 23709 | 78.41 | 6,701 |
| Mabandla | 23710 | 129.08 | 3,671 |
| Malenge | 23711 | 91.61 | 4,232 |
| Mvolozi | 23712 | 162.26 | 16,006 |
| Nqozama | 23713 | 4.26 | 287 |
| Rietvlei 1 | 23714 | 40.55 | 2,666 |
| Rietvlei 2 | 23715 | 4.25 | 700 |
| Rietvlei 3 Part 1 | 23716 | 3.91 | 4,374 |
| Rietvlei 3 Part 2 | 23724 | 0.13 | 221 |
| Sandile | 23717 | 133.94 | 8,735 |
| Silahla | 23718 | 126.47 | 13,275 |
| Singisi | 23719 | 1.36 | 813 |
| Straalhoek Forrest Station | 23721 | 0.20 | 66 |
| Straalhoek | 23720 | 0.13 | 135 |
| Umzimkhulu | 23725 | 12.56 | 6,519 |
| Zwelethu | 23723 | 203.23 | 17,240 |
| Remainder of the municipality | 23722 | 732.90 | 30,251 |

== Politics ==
The municipal council consists of forty-three members elected by mixed-member proportional representation. Twenty-two councillors are elected by first-past-the-post voting in twenty-two wards, while the remaining twenty-one are chosen from party lists so that the total number of party representatives is proportional to the number of votes received.

In the election of 4 November 2026 the African National Congress (ANC) lost its majority, but won a plurality of 21 seats on the council.

The following table shows the results of the election.

| Party | Ward | | | List | | | Total seats |
| Party | Votes | % | Seats | Votes | % | Seats | Total seats |
|---|---|---|---|---|---|---|---|
| African National Congress | 25,252 | 49.53 | 21 | 25,345 | 49.68 | 0 | 21 |
| uMkhonto weSizwe Party | 17,169 | 33.68 | 1 | 17,414 | 34.13 | 14 | 15 |
| South African Communist Party | 2,322 | 4.55 | 0 | 2,277 | 4.46 | 2 | 2 |
| Inkatha Freedom Party | 2,072 | 4.06 | 0 | 2,060 | 4.04 | 2 | 2 |
| Economic Freedom Fighters | 1,804 | 3.54 | 0 | 1,790 | 3.51 | 2 | 2 |
| Democratic Alliance | 1,112 | 2.18 | 0 | 1,182 | 2.32 | 1 | 1 |
| Independent candidates | 515 | 1.01 | 0 | | | | 0 |
| 6 other parties | 734 | 1.44 | 0 | 949 | 1.86 | 0 | 0 |
| Total | 50,980 | 100.00 | 22 | 51,017 | 100.00 | 21 | 43 |
| Valid votes | 50,980 | 98.22 | | 51,017 | 98.26 | | |
| Invalid/blank votes | 925 | 1.78 | | 903 | 1.74 | | |
| Total votes | 51,905 | 100.00 | | 51,920 | 100.00 | | |
| Registered voters/turnout | 98,126 | 52.90 | | 98,126 | 52.91 | | |
