= Underberg, KwaZulu-Natal =

Underberg
- Location within KwaZulu-Natal Location within South Africa
- Coordinates: 29°47′35″S 29°29′41″E
- Country: South Africa
- Province: KwaZulu-Natal
- District: Harry Gwala
- Municipality: Dr Nkosazana Dlamini-Zuma

Area
  - Total: 19.71 km^{2} (7.61 sq mi)
- Elevation: 1,543 m (5,062 ft)
- Highest elevation: 1,898 m (6,227 ft)
- Lowest elevation: 1,418 m (4,652 ft)

Population (2011)
  - Total: 2,694
  - Density: 136.7/km^{2} (354.0/sq mi)

Racial makeup (2011)
  - Black African: 79.7%
  - Coloured: 1.3%
  - Indian/Asian: 0.6%
  - White: 17.6%
  - Other: 0.7%

First languages (2011)
  - Zulu: 72.7%
  - English: 19.6%
  - Sotho: 2.3%
  - Xhosa: 1.9%
  - Other: 3.6%
- Time zone: UTC+2 (SAST)
- Postal code (street): 3257
- PO box: 3257
- Area code: 033

Underberg is an administrative town in a dairy and cattle farming community in the Mzimkulu River valley of KwaZulu-Natal, South Africa. It is situated at the foot of the 1,904 m (6,247 ft) Hlogoma Peak (place of echoes) in the foothills of the southern Drakensberg, KwaZulu-Natal. Underberg was established in 1917 when the railway from Pietermaritzburg reached the area. It is an important commercial centre for the region's farming industry providing many of the support services. It is also a trading center for people who come down the nearby Sani Pass from Lesotho.

The town also houses provincial offices of the ministries of Social Welfare and Transport, a clinic; as well as the municipal library. The Underberg School offers pre-primary and primary education.

Tourism is the second biggest industry in the area, next to farming. The area surrounding Underberg provides a large variety of tourism offerings, as a gateway to the Southern Drakensberg. The Southern Drakensberg Community Tourism Organisation was established by the community in 2007 and serves to promote tourism under the Southern Berg Escape brand. Underberg offers a variety of accommodation and eatery options, mostly of casual nature to suit most tastes.

The Underberg district is, along with Dullstroom, Mpumalanga, one of South Africa's premier trout fly fishing destinations. Splashy Fen, an annual outdoor music festival, is held on a farm near Underberg. The internationally acclaimed Sani2C Mountain Bike race held annually starts in Underberg, while paddlers from far and wide gather annually for the Drak Challenge canoe race held on the Mzimkulu river.

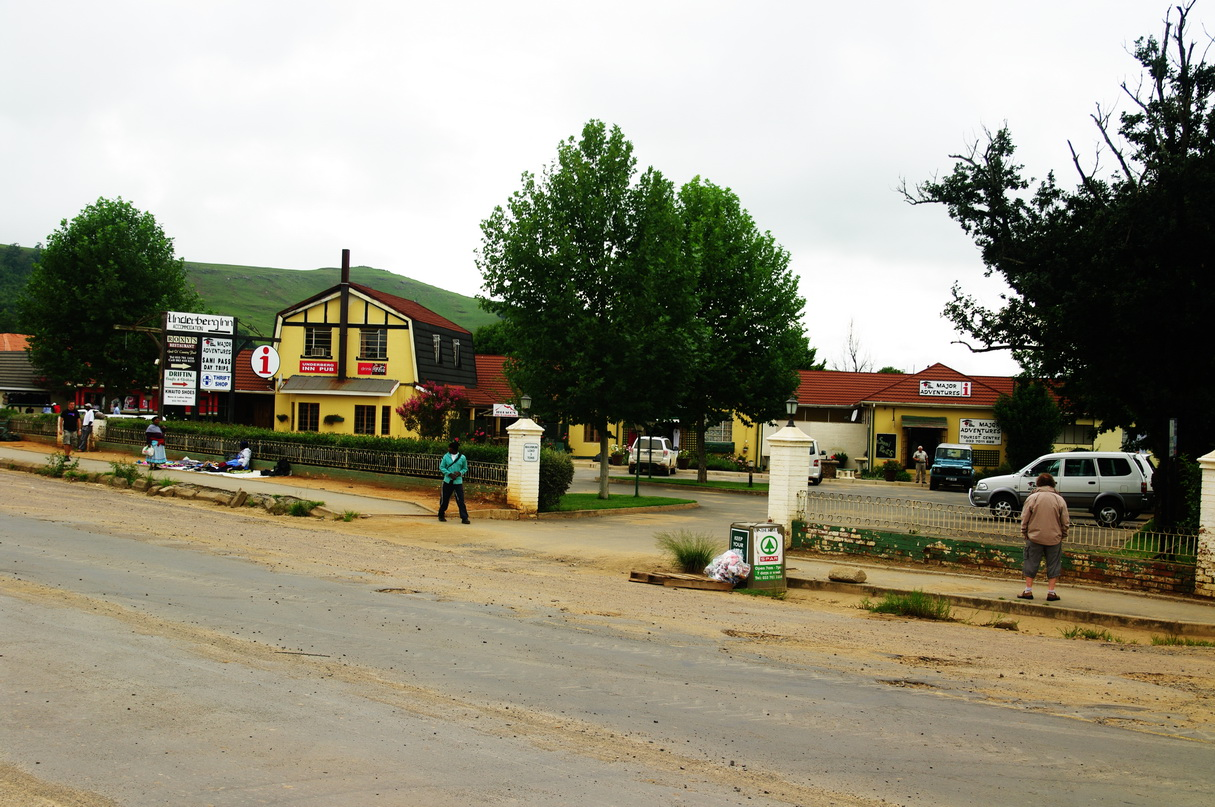
Shopping center in Underberg

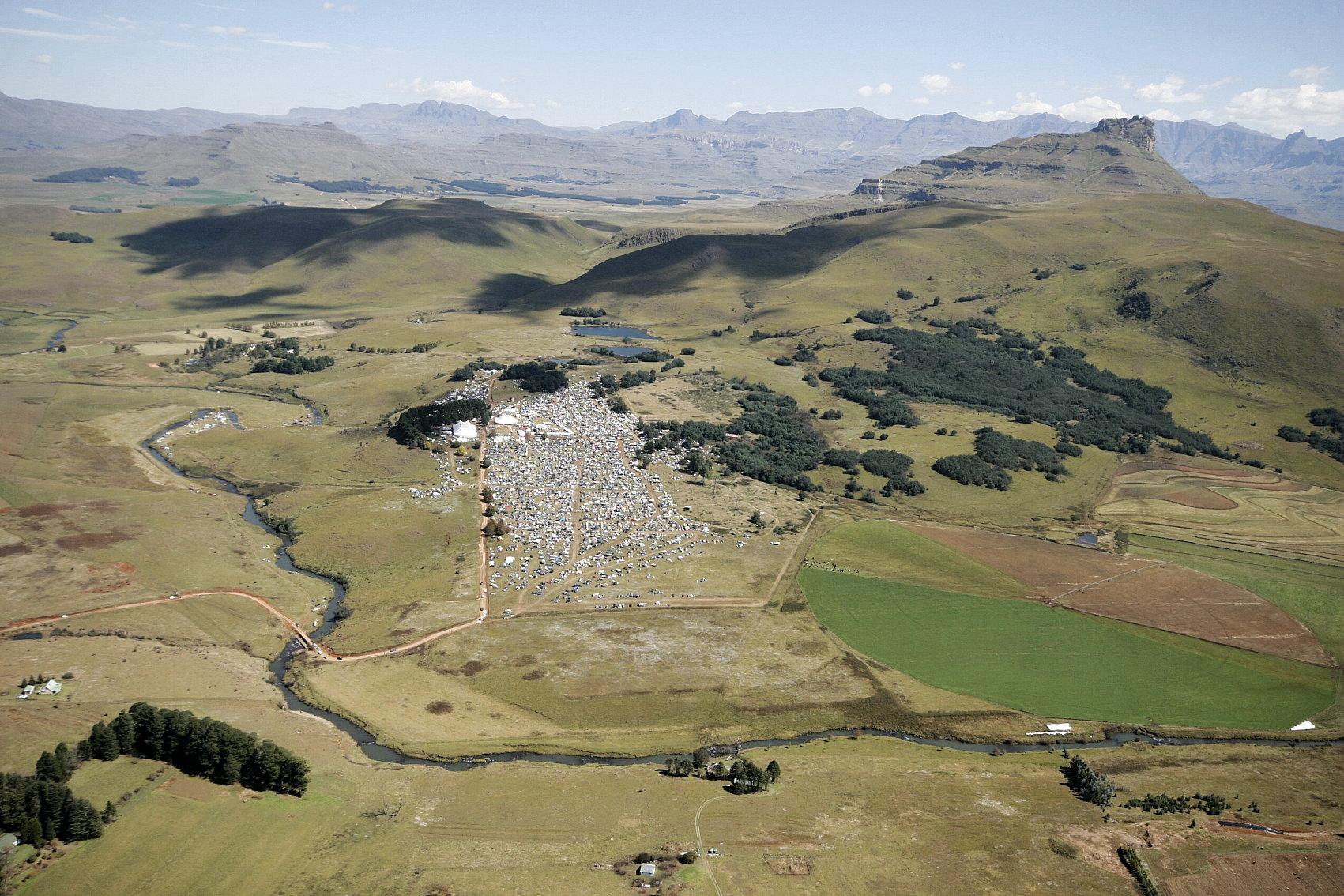
The Splashy Fen music festival, held yearly on a farm outside Underberg
