= Dr Nkosazana Dlamini-Zuma Local Municipality =

Coordinates: 30.030°S 29.836°E

Dr Nkosazana Dlamini-Zuma (Inja yeGame)
- Local municipality
- Country: South Africa
- Province: KwaZulu-Natal
- District: Harry Gwala
- Seat: Creighton

Government
  - Type: Municipal council

Area
  - Total: 3,602 km^{2} (1,391 sq mi)

Population (2011)
  - Total: 113,446
  - Density: 31.50/km^{2} (81.57/sq mi)
- Time zone: UTC+2 (SAST)
- Municipal code: KZN436

Dr Nkosazana Dlamini-Zuma Municipality (Zulu: UMasipala i-Dr Nkosazana Dlamini-Zuma) is a local municipality within the Harry Gwala District Municipality, in the KwaZulu-Natal province of South Africa. It was established after the 2016 municipal elections by merging the Ingwe and Kwa Sani local municipalities.

== Politics ==
The municipal council consists of twenty-nine members elected by mixed-member proportional representation. Fifteen councillors are elected by first-past-the-post voting in fifteen wards, while the remaining fourteen are chosen from party lists so that the total number of party representatives is proportional to the number of votes received.

In the election of 4 November 2026, no party won a majority. The uMkhonto weSizwe Party (MLP) won the largest number of seats on the council, with 12.

The following table shows the results of the election.

Party	Ward			List			Total seats
Party	Votes	%	Seats	Votes	%	Seats	Total seats
uMkhonto weSizwe Party	13,730	39.46	8	14,020	40.10	4	12
African National Congress	12,630	36.30	5	12,599	36.03	6	11
Inkatha Freedom Party	3,997	11.49	1	3,913	11.19	2	3
Democratic Alliance	2,879	8.27	1	2,839	8.12	1	2
Economic Freedom Fighters	731	2.10	0	722	2.06	1	1
5 other parties	825	2.37	0	872	2.49	0	0
Total	34,792	100.00	15	34,965	100.00	14	29
Valid votes	34,792	98.28		34,965	98.60		
Invalid/blank votes	610	1.72		497	1.40		
Total votes	35,402	100.00		35,462	100.00		
Registered voters/turnout	61,948	57.15		61,948	57.24		
