= Harry Gwala District Municipality =

Coordinates: 30°08′S 30°04′E

Harry Gwala
- District municipality
- Seal

- Location in South Africa
- Country: South Africa
- Province: KwaZulu-Natal
- Seat: Ixopo
- Local municipalities: List: Dr Nkosazana Dlamini-Zuma; Greater Kokstad; Johannes Phumani Phungula; Umzimkhulu

Government
  - Type: Municipal council
  - Mayor: Z D Nxumalo

Area
  - Total: 10,547 km^{2} (4,072 sq mi)

Population (2011)
  - Total: 461,419
  - Density: 43.749/km^{2} (113.31/sq mi)

Racial makeup (2011)
  - Black African: 96.7%
  - Coloured: 1.6%
  - Indian/Asian: 0.3%
  - White: 1.2%

First languages (2011)
  - Zulu: 62.7%
  - Xhosa: 28.6%
  - English: 3.2%
  - Afrikaans: 1.3%
  - Other: 4.2%
- Time zone: UTC+2 (SAST)
- Municipal code: DC43

The Harry Gwala District Municipality (Zulu: UMasipala wesiFunda sase Harry Gwala; Xhosa: uMasipala weSithili sase Harry Gwala), formerly the Sisonke District Municipality, is one of the 11 districts of the KwaZulu-Natal province of South Africa. The seat is Ixopo. The majority of its 298,392 inhabitants spoke isiZulu as of 2011. The district code is DC43. The district's name was changed in November 2015 in honor of African National Congress leader Harry Gwala.

== Geography ==
=== Neighbours ===
Harry Gwala is surrounded by:

- Umgungundlovu to the north-east (DC22)
- Ugu to the south-east (DC21)
- OR Tambo to the south (DC15)
- Alfred Nzo to the south-west (DC44)
- The kingdom of Lesotho to the north-west
- Uthukela to the North (DC23)

=== Local municipalities ===
The district contains the following local municipalities:

Local municipality	Population	%	Dominant language
Dr Nkosazana Dlamini-Zuma	113 446	24.6%	Zulu
Johannes Phumani Phungula	101 965	22.34%	Zulu
Greater Kokstad	56 528	12.38%	Xhosa
Umzimkhulu	174 338	38.19%	Xhosa

== Demographics ==
The following statistics are from the 2001 census.

Language	Population	%
IsiZulu	220 295	73.83%
IsiXhosa	50 431	16.90%
English	12 097	4.05%
Afrikaans	7 188	2.41%
Sesotho	7 182	2.41%
IsiNdebele	429	0.14%
Sepedi	296	0.10%
SiSwati	145	0.05%
Other	143	0.05%
Setswana	135	0.05%
Tshivenda	26	0.01%
Xitsonga	18	0.01%

=== Gender ===
Gender	Population	%
Female	160 005	53.62%
Male	138 387	46.38%

=== Ethnic group ===
Ethnic group	Population	%
Black African	280 332	93.95%
Coloured	10 081	3.38%
White	6 988	2.34%
Indian/Asian	991	0.33%

=== Age ===
Age	Population	%
000 - 004	35 445	11.88%
005 - 009	40 097	13.44%
010 - 014	41 502	13.91%
015 - 019	37 456	12.55%
020 - 024	25 634	8.59%
025 - 029	21 306	7.14%
030 - 034	17 399	5.83%
035 - 039	16 607	5.57%
040 - 044	13 964	4.68%
045 - 049	11 579	3.88%
050 - 054	9 601	3.22%
055 - 059	7 263	2.43%
060 - 064	6 452	2.16%
065 - 069	4 821	1.62%
070 - 074	4 227	1.42%
075 - 079	2 391	0.80%
080 - 084	1 747	0.59%
085 - 089	528	0.18%
090 - 094	217	0.07%
095 - 099	122	0.04%
100 plus	34	0.01%

== Politics ==
=== Election results ===
Election results for Harry Gwala in the South African general election, 2004.

- Population 18 and over: 157 807 [52.89% of total population]
- Total votes: 83 403 [27.95% of total population]
- Voting % estimate: 52.85% votes as a % of population 18 and over

Party	Votes	%
African National Congress	52 531	62.98%
Inkatha Freedom Party	21 433	25.70%
Democratic Alliance	3 628	4.35%
United Democratic Movement	1 712	2.05%
African Christian Democratic Party	1 350	1.62%
New National Party	315	0.38%
Independent Democrats	304	0.36%
Azanian People's Organisation	299	0.36%
Freedom Front Plus	296	0.35%
Pan African Congress	291	0.35%
SOPA	195	0.23%
United Christian Democratic Party	165	0.20%
UF	152	0.18%
EMSA	118	0.14%
CDP	116	0.14%
TOP	116	0.14%
PJC	108	0.13%
Minority Front	89	0.11%
NA	87	0.10%
KISS	58	0.07%
NLP	40	0.05%
Total	83 403	100.00%
