= List of abandoned railway lines in South Africa =

This is a list of disused, abandoned, closed or dismantled railway lines in South Africa since 1910.

The list is primarily intended to document South African Railways (government) or private lines of historical significance (e.g. Okiep railway).

== Closed lines ==
Route (from/to)	Closure date	Notes
Bridgend–Cape Collieries	1912	
Bamboo Junction–Bridgend	1917	
Lyttelton Junction–Roberts Heights	1913	
Sheba Halt–Sheba Mine	1926	
Valley Junction–Walmer	1928	Narrow gauge. Walmer town branch of the Avontuur line. Replaced by bus service.
Monument–Sea Point	1929	This line ran from Cape Town City to Sea Point. Uplifted after closure.
Colesberg Junction–Colesberg	1931	Originally a terminus, this later became a spur off the Noupoort–Bloemfontein line.
Elandshoek – Mount Carmel	1931	Narrow gauge.
Hamilton–Tempe	1932	
Point–Durban	1936	original 1860 route (oldest line in South Africa)
Stanger–Kearsney	1941	Narrow gauge. Kearsney–Stanger Light Railway
Okiep–Port Nolloth	1944?	Narrow gauge. Namaqualand Railway
Knysna–Templeman	1949	Narrow gauge. South Western Railway Co. Ltd.
Opwekker–Tygerberg	1956	Milnerton Railway, opened 1904, last race train 1954. Heatherton–Milnerton–Ascot–Tygerberg(terminus) section uplifted shortly after closure.
Nancefield–Pimville	1974	(railway lines have been uplifted)
Wests–Cave Rock (whaling station)	197?	
Sarnia–New Germany	1994+-	Line was uplifted in the early 1990s due to the closure of the Umgani power station in 1988
Delville Wood–Shongweni Dam	?	Service line for construction of dam.
Wartburg–Windy Hill	?	
Touws River–Ladismith	1981	Closed due to line washaway caused by the 1981 flash flood.
Estcourt–Weenen	1983	Narrow gauge. Estcourt – Weenen
Molteno–Jamestown	1984	(railway lines have been uplifted)
Fort Beaufort–Seymour	1984	
Komatipoort–Reserve	?	Part of the Selati line through the Kruger National Park
Umlaas Road–Mid Illovo	1985	Narrow gauge.
Umzinto–Highflats	1985	Narrow gauge. Part of the Umzinto–Donnybrook narrow-gauge railway
Ixopo–Highflats	1985	Narrow gauge. Part of the Umzinto–Donnybrook narrow-gauge railway
Union Bridge–Madonela	1985	Narrow gauge. Part of the Umzinto–Donnybrook narrow-gauge railway
Ixopo–Donnybrook	1986	Narrow gauge. Part of the Umzinto–Donnybrook narrow-gauge railway
Port Shepstone–Harding	1986	Narrow gauge. Re-opened in 1988, see Alfred County Railway
Kelso–Umzinto	1987	Cape Gauge, closure after abandonment of the Umzinto–Donnybrook narrow-gauge railway
Gingindlovu–Eshowe North	1987	Closed after line washaway
Boughton–Hilton	1987	Part of old alignment of the Natal main line
Umlaas Road–Thornville	1988	Part of old alignment of the Natal main line
Bowkers Park–Tarkastad	1988	(railway lines have been uplifted)
Imvani–Qamata	1988	(railway lines have been uplifted)
De Doorns–Kleinstraat	1989	old Hex River Pass line. Replaced by Hex River Tunnel
Matroosberg–Kleinstraat	1989	Loop line for the old Hex River Pass. Replaced by Hex River Tunnel. (railway lines have been uplifted)
Groveput–Copperton	1991	Closure of mine.
Schoombee–Hofmeyr	1992	
Grahamstown–Port Alfred	1993	Port Alfred Railway Line
Armoed–Calitzdorp	1993	
Cookhouse–Somerset East	1993	
Barkly Bridge–Alexandria	1993	
Louterwater–Avontuur	1993	Narrow gauge. Section of the Avontuur line
Hercules–Magaliesburg	1996	Passed through Hartbeespoort
Pinetown–Cato Ridge	1997 partly still open	there is a weekend steam train run by umgeni steam railway between Inchanga and kloof currently only to bothas hill due to line damage
Modderpoort–Ladybrand	199?	
Marseilles–Ficksburg	Open	
Volksrust–Bethal	?	
Witpilaar–Vredenburg	?	A spur off the Hopefield–Saldanha line. (railway lines have been uplifted)
Pieters–Harts Hill	?	service line to quarry
Estantia–Klipstapel	?	
Paarl–Franschhoek	Closed early 2000's (partly still open)	Small sections privately operated by Franschhoek Wine Tram, rest of line still intact but abandoned.
Merrivale–Howick	?	
Hilton–Cedara	?	Part of old alignment of the Natal main line
Theunissen–Winburg	199?	Branch opened 1898. Branch was originally planned to be extended to Senekal
Orkney–Vierfontein	?	Uplifted after washaway. Re-laid, open December 2012
Springfontein–Koffiefontein	2001	
Dover–Vredefort	2001	
Wolvehoek–Heilbron	2001 Uplifted / stolen	
Arlington–Heilbron	200?	
Chelsea–New Brighton	2001	Narrow gauge. Private branch of the Avontuur line, to PPC cement factory. Caused by closure of all limestone mines along Avontuur line.
Aliwal North–Barkly East	2001	
Sterkstroom–Maclear	2001	
Rosmead–Stormberg	2001	
Hutchinson–Calvinia	2001	
Kootjieskolk–Sakrivier	2001	Branch line off the Hutchinson–Calvinia line.
Cor Delfos–Voortrekkerhoogte	2001	
Nylstroom–Vaalwater	2002	
Naboomspruit–Zebediela	2003	
Pienaars River–Marble Hall	2003	
Pentrich–Mkondeni	2004	Service line. Part of old alignment of the Natal main line.
Alfred County Railway	2004	Narrow gauge. Started 1988, Port Shepstone–Harding
Cor Delfos–Mooiplaas	2004?	Service line to PPC Dolomite quarry at Erasmia near Pretoria, passed through Laudium
Sannaspos–Zastron	2006	
George–Knysna	2006	Original Outeniqua Choo Tjoe route. Closed due to line washaway.
India Junction–Alberton	2007	
Grootvlei–Redan	?	
Alicedale–Grahamstown	2008	Port Alfred Railway Line
Thornville–Richmond	2008?	
Assegaaibos–Louterwater	2009	Narrow gauge. Section of the Avontuur line
Gamtoos–Patensie	2009	Narrow gauge. Branch of the Avontuur line
Kaydale–Nigel	2010	

== Re-opened ==
- Klipplaat–Graaff-Reinet closed in 2001, re-opened in 2015/2016. Unused since.
- Graaff-Reinet–Rosmead, closed in 1993, re-opened in 2015/2016. Unused since.
- Wolseley–Prince Alfred Hamlet (branch line), closed c.2002, re-opened in 2015.
- Belmont–Douglas, Upgraded 2013/2014.

== Unsure status ==
- Firham–Vrede
- Kaapmuiden–Barberton
- Nelspruit–Plaston
- Buhrmannskop–Lothair
- Makwassie–Vermaas
- Vermaas–Pudimoe
- Klerksdorp–Ottosdal
- Franklin–Matatiele
- Franklin–Kokstad
- Ennersdale–Bergville
- Schroeders–Bruyns Hill
- Dalton–Glenside
- Chailley–Mount Alida
- Greytown–Kranskop
- Dreunberg–Zastron
- Addo–Kirkwood
