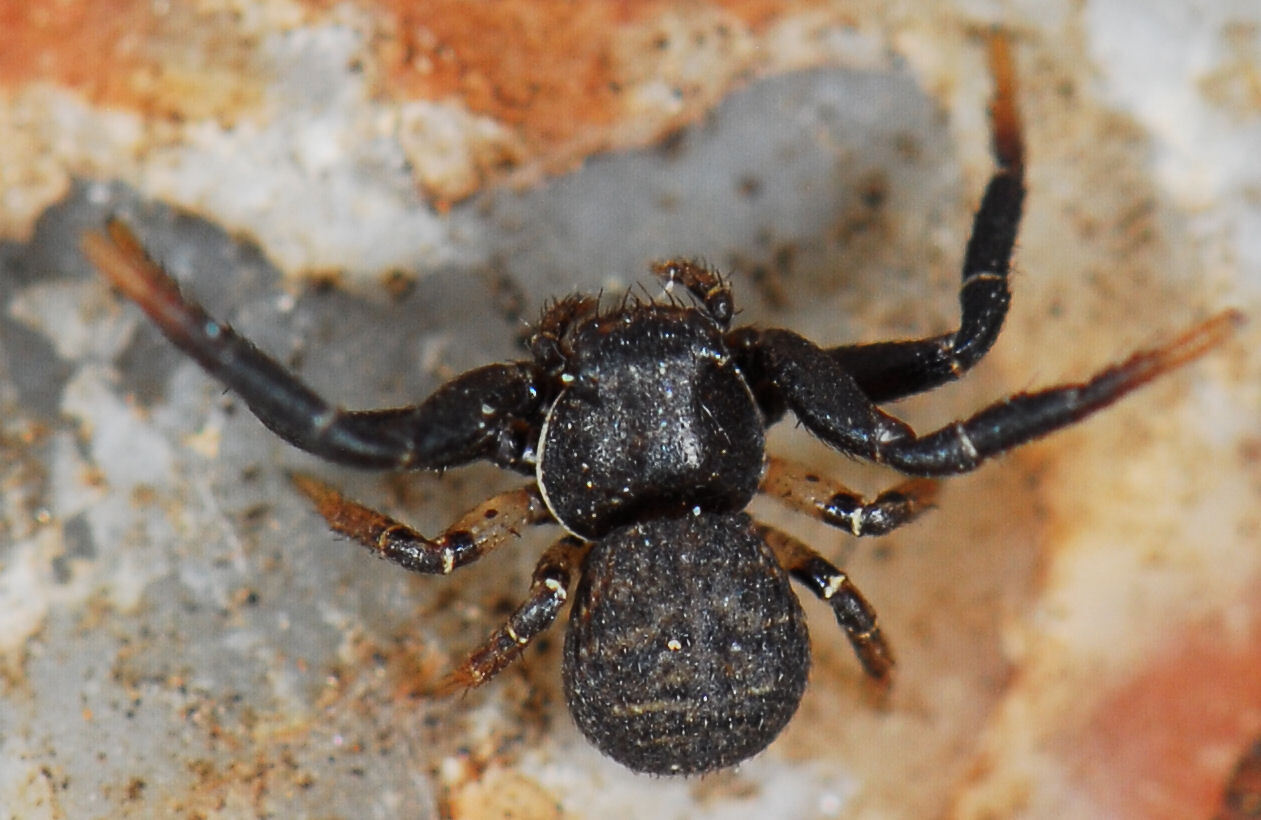
- female
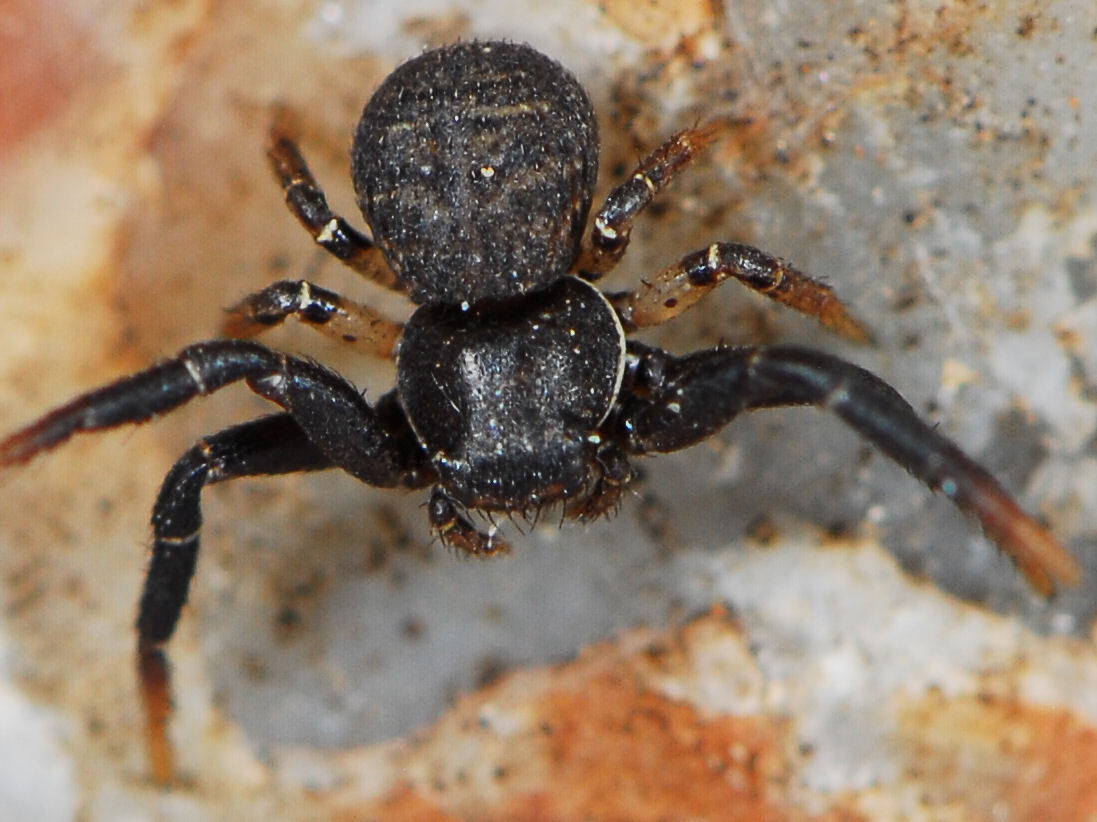
- female

Scientific classification
- Kingdom: Animalia
- Phylum: Arthropoda
- Subphylum: Chelicerata
- Class: Arachnida
- Order: Araneae
- Infraorder: Araneomorphae
- Family: Thomisidae
- Genus: Xysticus
- Species: X. havilandi

Binomial name
- Xysticus havilandi Lawrence, 1942

= Xysticus havilandi =

Haviland's Ground Crab Spider

Species of spider

Xysticus havilandi is a species of spider in the family Thomisidae. It is endemic to South Africa and is commonly known as Haviland's ground crab spider.

== Distribution ==
Xysticus havilandi is endemic to South Africa, where it occurs across five provinces: Eastern Cape, Free State, Gauteng, KwaZulu-Natal, and Western Cape. The species has a wide geographical range and occurs at altitudes ranging from 4 to 1,809 m above sea level.

Notable locations include Alicedale, Baviaanskloof Nature Reserve, Kalkfontein Dam Nature Reserve, Glenharven, Baviaanspoort, Kranskop, Durban, Newcastle district, Bontebok National Park, and Matjiesfontein.

== Habitat and ecology ==
Xysticus havilandi are ground dwellers that inhabit Fynbos, Grassland, and Savanna biomes.

== Conservation ==
Xysticus havilandi is listed as Least Concern by the South African National Biodiversity Institute due to its wide geographical range. The species is protected in three protected areas: Baviaanskloof Nature Reserve, Kalkfontein Dam Nature Reserve, and Bontebok National Park.

== Description ==
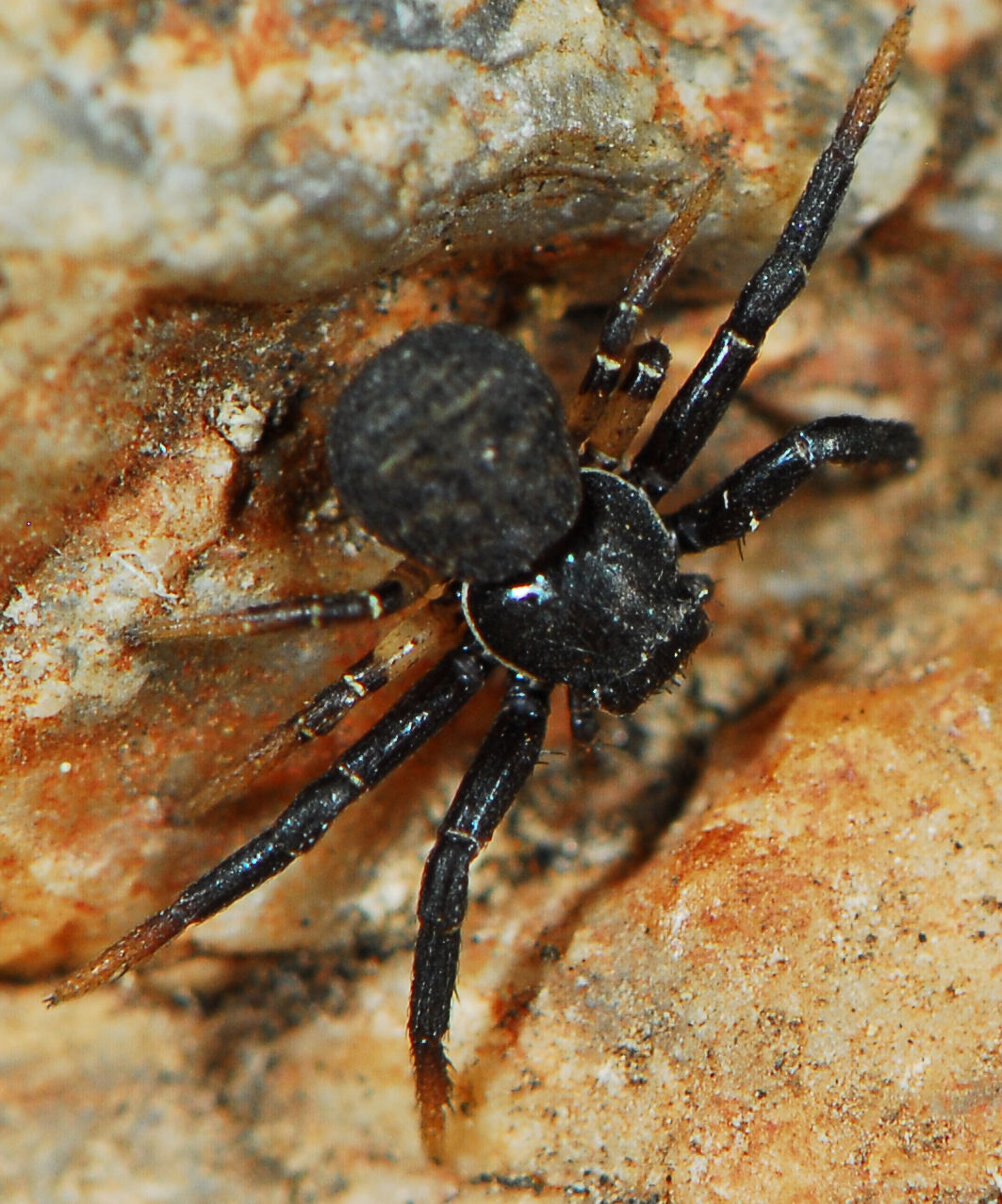
female

== Taxonomy ==
The species was originally described by Reginald Frederick Lawrence in 1942 with the type locality given only as Natal. African species of Xysticus have not been revised. The species is known only from the female, and more sampling is needed to collect the male.
