= Frederick Slessor =

British railway engineer (1831–1905)

Frederick George Slessor M. Inst. C.E. ACK
- Born: 1831; Sidmouth, Devon, England
- Died: 15 October 1905; Somerset, England
- Occupation: Engineer
- Known for: Designing and building railways

Frederick George Slessor (1831–1905) was a British railway engineer who worked in England, India, South Africa, and continental Europe.

== Early life ==
Slessor was born in 1831 in Sidmouth, Devon, England to Major General John Henry Slessor. He attended the Sherborne School and later trained as civil engineer as a pupil of M. W. Peniston M. Inst. C.E.

== Career ==
In December 1874, following nomination by Sir Charles Hutton Gregory, he was appointed by Cape Government Railways, first as Chief Officer of Surveys and Resident Engineer, and then as Chief Resident Engineer of the Eastern system. After 16 years' service at the Cape he retired on a pension and returned to Britain.

Alicedale, a village in the Albany district, was named after his wife, Alice Slessor, who died in Queenstown, Eastern Cape, in September 1882. (Note: Some sources, including Raper, state incorrectly that Alice Slessor's maiden name was Dale. The record of their marriage at St John's Church in the Parish of Paddington on 10 September 1867 clearly indicates that Alice's name was Malton and that she was a spinster at the time of her marriage.)

Slessor died on 15 October 1905 in Somerset, England.

== Publications ==
- Reports by Mr. Slessor, Chief Resident Engineer and Mr. Tilney, Locomotive Superintendent of the East London and Queens's Town Railway, of Trials of Coal from the Indwe and Molteno Mines. South Africa: Cape of Good Hope. 1880. with J D Tilney
- Report of His Recent Examination of the Country to be Traversed by a Junction Line Between the Midland and Eastern Railways. Cape of Good Hope (South Africa): Richards. 1886.

== See also ==
- Guybon Atherstone
- South African locomotive history
