= Erica psittacina =

Scientific classification
- Kingdom: Plantae
- Clade: Embryophytes
- Clade: Tracheophytes
- Clade: Spermatophytes
- Clade: Angiosperms
- Clade: Eudicots
- Clade: Asterids
- Order: Ericales
- Family: Ericaceae
- Genus: Erica
- Species: E. psittacina

Binomial name
- Erica psittacina E.G.H.Oliv. & I.M.Oliv.

Species of flowering plant

Erica psittacina, the parrot tree erica or Hlabeni heath, is a tree belonging to the genus Erica. The species is endemic to KwaZulu-Natal and occurs at Donnybrook where there is one population of approximately 100 plants. The habitat is threatened by uncontrolled wildfires.
