= Port Alfred Railway Line =

Railway line in South Africa

Map of the Port Alfred railway line

The Port Alfred Railway Line is a non-electrified railway line, that connects Alicedale with Grahamstown and Port Alfred in South Africa.

== History ==
The construction of the line was part of the massive expansion of the Cape Colony's railway system, that was begun in the 1870s by Prime Minister John Molteno and the Cape Government Railways. The first section, connecting Alicedale and Grahamstown was completed in 1881. The remaining 68 km to Port Alfred were opened on 1 October 1883.

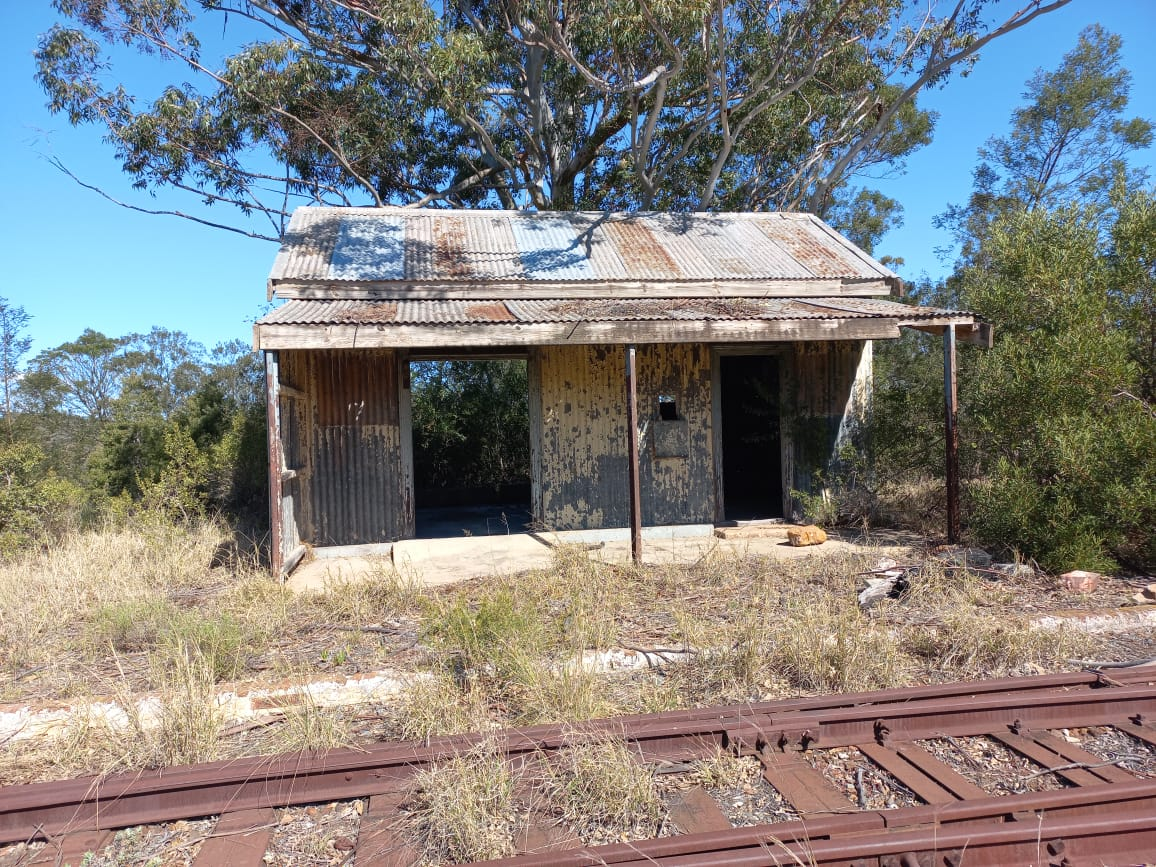
The Atherstone Railway station between Grahamstown and Alicedale in the Eastern Cape on the Port Alfred Railway line (2021).

Passenger services were reduced to the Alicedale - Grahamstown section of the line in 1988 and the line was closed entirely in 1990. Service was restored between Alicedale and Grahamstown in 1995 and suspended again in 2008.

== Operation ==
Until 2008 the line was served by one Shosholoza Meyl passenger train per day in each direction between Grahamstown and Alicedale. This train consists of one diesel locomotive and three passenger carriages. In Alicedale the service connects to the main line train to Johannesburg.

The section between Grahamstown and Port Alfred is not in use.
