= Umzinto–Donnybrook narrow-gauge railway =

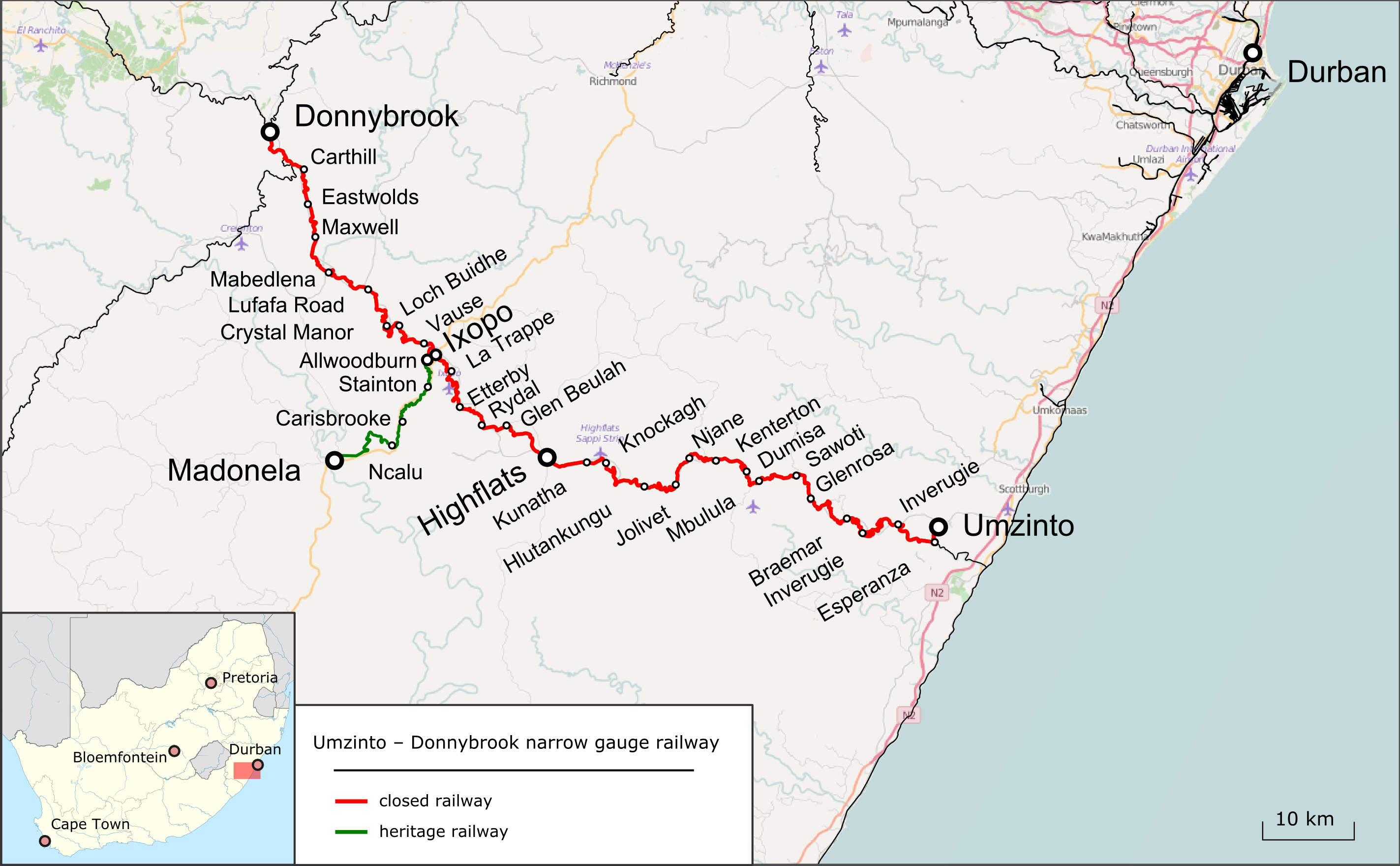

Overview
- Status: main line: closed, short branch: heritage railway
- Owner: original: SAR, heritage railway: PCNGR
- Termini: Umzinto; Donnybrook

Service
- Type: Narrow-gauge railway
- Rolling stock: steam engines: NGG3, NG11, NG16

History
- Opened: Umzinto–Donnybrook: 1908 Madonela Branch: 14 February 1914
- Closed: 1987
- Reopened: 2000 ( Madonela Branch as heritage railway)

Technical
- Line length: 93 mi (150 km)
- Track gauge: 2 ft (610 mm)
- Operating speed: 12 mph (19 km/h)

The Umzinto–Donnybrook narrow-gauge railway is a closed 2 ft (610 mm) narrow-gauge railway line in South Africa. It runs from Umzinto to Donnybrook, passing through Highflats and Ixopo, with a branch from Ixopo to Madonela (Union Bridge). The line was built in 1908 and was 93 miles (150 km) in length.

== Construction ==
The mainline was constructed using second-hand rails becoming available from track upgrades on Cape gauge railways. The total line was laid for £3,200 a mile. The construction and equipment of this railway barely exceeded £300,000.

The rails were 30 kilograms per metre (60.5 lb/yd), in 18-metre (59.1 ft) lengths. The ruling gradient was 1 in 33 (3.33%) uncompensated for curvature.

The 17.5-mile (28.2 km) Madonela Branch was built for a maximum axle load of 5 long tons (5.6 short tons; 5.1 t) and a speed of 12 miles per hour (19 km/h) at a cost of about £50 000 and the first trains ran on 2 February 1914.

== Operations ==
In the 1970s a typical crew operation roster consisted of three daily trains: The first train ran from Ixopo to Donnybrook, and returned to Ixopo, a full day's shift. The second train also departed from Ixopo but serviced the Madonela branch and then ran back to Ixopo. The third train departed from Umzinto.

At Highflats daily trains crossed at one o'clock in the afternoon, exchanged the crew and the locomotives were serviced. A single run costs more than 5 hours.

Several balcony carriages were used for passenger services up to Easter 1946. Afterwards, although there was no official passenger transport, incidental travellers could find a place to travel in the guard's van.

There were transshipment facilities to Cape gauge railways at Umzinto and Donnybrook.

== Closure ==
Various sections of the railway closed between 1985 and 1987 after washouts, but the Ixopo to Madonela branch was rebuilt in 2000 by the Patons Country Narrow Gauge Railway.

After closure, the majority of the tracks were lifted to be used on the Welsh Highland Railway. Any leftovers were later recovered for the Patons Country Railway.

== Locomotives used ==
NGG3, NG11, NG16.

== Media references ==
In the movie Cry, the Beloved Country based on the novel of the same name by Alan Paton the Reverend Stephen Kumalo travels on the narrow gauge train between Carisbrooke and Donnybrook en route to Johannesburg.

== See also ==
- Rail transport in South Africa
- List of South African locomotive classes
- List of abandoned railway lines in South Africa
- Two-foot-gauge railways in South Africa
