= Talana, KwaZulu-Natal =

Talana
- Location within KwaZulu-Natal Location within South Africa
- Coordinates: 28.178°S 30.255°E
- Country: South Africa
- Province: KwaZulu-Natal
- District: Umzinyathi
- Municipality: Endumeni
- Time zone: UTC+2 (SAST)
- PO box: 3023

Talana is a village 5 km east of Dundee on the route between Vryheid and Glencoe. The name is Zulu and derives from the shelf, made of itala grass, around the central pole in a Zulu chief's home. Amulets, precious items and valuables were placed on this Talana Shelf. Hence the name means "the place where treasures are kept."

." Talana Hill is a flat-topped hill and was the scene of the famous Battle of Talana Hill on 20 October 1899, between the Boers and the British.
