= Port Shepstone railway station =

Railway station in South Africa

Coordinates: 30.7434218°S 30.4570735°E

Port Shepstone railway station is a railway station located in Port Shepstone, South Africa.

The station serves as both the southern terminus of Cape Gauge (3' 6"/1067mm) 111 kilometres (69 mi) line from to Durban, as well as the southern coastal terminus of the narrow gauge Alfred County Railway to Harding, KwaZulu-Natal. Opened for operations in 1917, it also served the port facilities of the local docks.

After the standard gauge Transnet passenger services shut in 1986, the ACR continued operations until 2005, when the famous Banana Express ceased operation.

Today, the station purely acts as turning/shunting point for the thrice-weekly Transnet Freight Rail limestone traffic to Saiccor. As a result, the station still houses a diesel shunter. It also acts as the storage point for the unused carriages of the Blue Train, which have been vandalised through a lack of permanent staffing of the site. In May 2014, the KwaZulu-Natal government allocated R200 million for the refurbishment of the Port Shepstone railway.
