= Middleton, South Africa =

Middleton
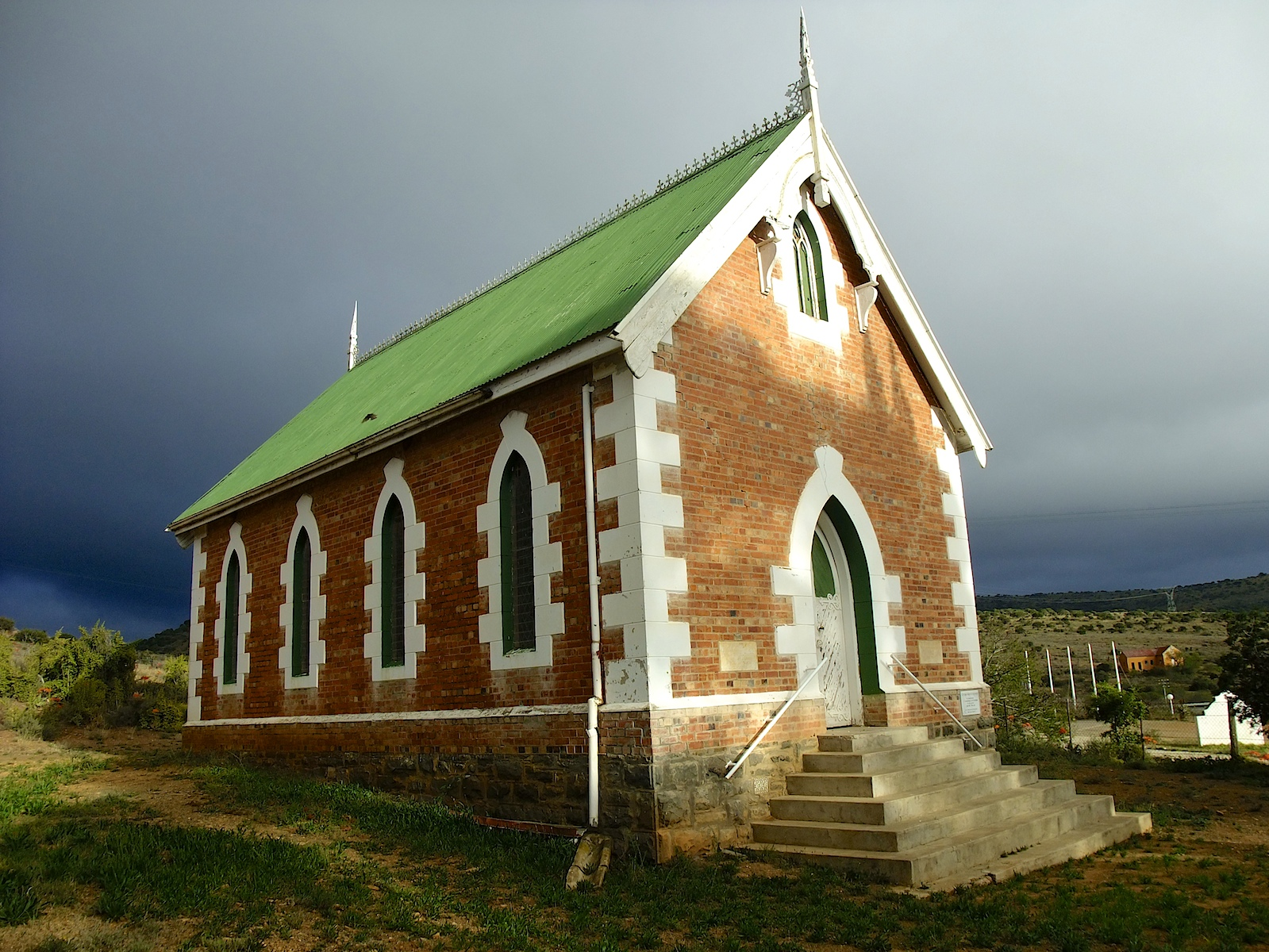
- Old church in Middleton, built 1903

- Location within Eastern Cape Location within South Africa
- Coordinates: 32.949°S 25.816°E
- Country: South Africa
- Province: Eastern Cape
- District: Sarah Baartman
- Municipality: Blue Crane Route
- Time zone: UTC+2 (SAST)
- PO box: 5810

Middleton is a hamlet in the Blue Crane Route Local Municipality of the Sarah Baartman District Municipality in the Eastern Cape province of South Africa. Middleton is situated on the banks of the Fish River off the N10 road and is about 30 kilometres (20 mi) south of Cookhouse.

== History ==
Middleton is located near Cookhouse and was first established in 1879 as a train station to act as a layover point between larger towns. At the turn of the 20th century, the Middleton complex was developed by Mr George Webster, a blacksmith by trade. The site played a very important part in those transport days.

In 1901 he donated land for the building of a church and the little church was built as a Methodist Church in 1903. At the time Middleton comprised a hotel, smithy building, general dealer’s shop, church school and 500 morgen of veld. In 1992 the church became part of the All Saint’s United Church and it’s utilised by the residents of Middelton regularly. The old train station has now been converted into a pub.

The Noupoort Christian Care Center owns the hamlet of Middleton. This center runs a rehabilitation center for people suffering from substance addiction. The center provides recovering addicts with jobs in maintaining the grounds and establishments of Middleton.

== Buildings ==
The most notable building in Middleton is the old train station, which has now been converted into a pub. The train station was built in 1879, and is the oldest standing building in the small hamlet. Another notable building is the All Saint's United Church, a stone church first built as a Methodist congregation in 1903. The architecture of the older buildings in Middleton is distinctly Victorian, especially the train station-turned-pub.

== Attractions ==
The old station pub offers usual pub fare along with a play area and petting zoo for children. Middleton also has B&B and camping facilities such as the Hunters Lodge and the B&B at the Manor.

Travellers consider Middleton a quaint stopover on their way to other attractions. The Addo Elephant National Park and a number of private game reserves are less than an hour's drive south along the N10 highway from Middleton. Grahamstown is an hour's drive southeast. Two hours to the northeast are the towns Graaff-Reinet and Nieu-Bethesda, which are home to many attractions including the Camdeboo National Park, the Nieu-Bethesda Owl House, and the Kitching Fossil Exploration Centre. An hours drive to the south will take travellers to Port Elizabeth and on to the Garden Route on the south coast.

== See also ==
- List of heritage sites in Graaff-Reinet
- George, Western Cape
- Knysna
- Plettenberg Bay
- Mossel Bay
- Bloukrans Bridge Bungy
- Tsitsikamma
