= South Western Railway (South Africa) =

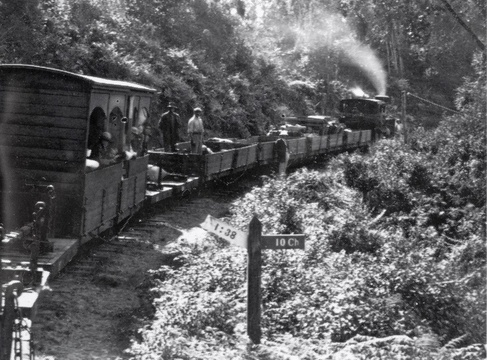
Train being hauled by a steam locomotive

The South Western Railway Co. Ltd., Also called Knysna Forest Railway, was a 2 ft (610 mm) narrow gauge forest railway in the southern Cape Province in South Africa. The line connected the port of Knysna with sawmills in the Tsitsikamma Forest and had a length of 31 kilometers. The railway was in operation between 1907 and 1949.

== History ==
In the late 19th Century, during the Second Boer War the timber transport with the help of mules and oxen reached its capacity limit, as many mules and their drivers had been drafted into military service. The 1898 replacing attempt using a steam tractor failed because the machine sank in the muddy roads. For this reason it was decided to build a railway.

The Government and the Cape Government Railways supported the project because the wood of the region was used, among other things, for the production of railway sleepers. Also a connection to Avontuur, the terminus of the 2 ft (610 mm) narrow gauge Avontuur Railway to Port Elizabeth was considered, and although only 31 km apart, no money was provided for it at this time. The project was also not pursued because the Tsitsikamma Mountains would have made a connection very time-consuming.

The construction of the line lasted from 1904 to 1907. It was completed 20 years before the Cape gauge route from George reached Knysna, until then it was completely isolated from the rest of South Africa's rail network.

== Railway description ==
The 31-kilometer rail line from Knysna on the Indian Ocean climbed to about 430 meters above sea level at the terminus in Deep Walls, and the trip took about four hours to complete, where speeds of 10 km/h were rarely exceeded. On the route, there were three railway stations: Bracken Hill Park Station and Temple Mans. Bracken Hill and Temple Mans sawmills were located in Parkes, a small settlement. Deep Walls was not much more than a clearing in the forest, which served as a rallying point for the wood that was cut in the area.

The railways transported not only raw and already processed wood from the sawmills, but to a lesser extent durable goods for the sawmills and settlements, and even passengers. However, there were no passenger trains, but only a single roofed passenger car that was accompanying the freight trains.

== Profitability ==
By 1911, the railway was able to keep financially afloat with difficulty. Revenue ranged from just to pay the interest, salaries and vehicle maintenance. But then, less than 50 meters away from the railway line, lignite deposits were discovered. The hope not just burn the coal in the locomotives, but also to sell on the market, faded within a few months, because the deposits proved to be too small for profitable exploitation.

In the already difficult years of the First World War, in 1916 the railway suffered substantial flood damage after heavy rains and several bridges were damaged or destroyed. However, the damage was already repaired a month later, and the entire line was back in operation.

In 1919 the first small profit dividends were paid to the owners. In the same year, however, a factory for railway sleepers was moved from Knysna to Mossel Bay. This eliminated not only the transport of the finished sleepers itself, but also the transport of creosote used for the impregnation of the sleepers.

== Decline and closure ==
In the mid-1920s the South Western Railway helped constructing an embankment for the new cape gauge railway line to George. When the South African Railways (SAR) reached Knysna in 1927, the port lost most of its importance, together with the South Western Railway. On the other hand, there was hope that the SAR would take over the narrow gauge railway, which quickly dashed because the SAR considered the narrow gauge lines as obsolete. However, the forest railway could continue to work, sometimes on the verge of financial collapse, and lost more and more customers due to the emerging of competition from road trucks .

In 1934, for first time since 1911, another locomotive was purchased, a second hand locomotive of the SAR NG3 class.

1944, a commission of the SAR after came to the conclusion that the heavily corroded rails were no longer suitable for safe operations and recommended the closure of the railway. Because of the shortage of motor vehicles after the Second World War however, new rails were laid again, procured from South West Africa. This work was completed until 1946 and would have allowed operation of the railway for the next 20 years.

In 1947 there was the only serious accident on the railway, when a child lost a hand during a collision. This case contributed to the suspension of operations on 7 November 1947, the last train drove on 30 April 1949. Then the track was completely lifted within the next year.

One of the four locomotives survived as an industrial locomotive in Witwatersrand, the rest of the rolling stock was sold as scrap. Today, only few traces remind of the railway, for example on a quayside in Knysna.

== Locomotives ==
The South Western Railway had a total of four steam locomotives. The machines were fitted with spark arrestors on the chimneys, for the prevention of forest fires.

Number	Year	Builder	Arrangement	Comment
1	1906	Orenstein & Koppel	B1' n2t	Wood fired
2	1907	Orenstein & Koppel	C1' n2t	Wood fired
3	1911	Orenstein & Koppel	D n2t	Wood fired
4	1934	Hawthorn Leslie and Company	2'C1' n2t	Ex-SAR NG 3 Nr. 4, 1907

Mainly flatcars for long timber and open wagons were used, there was also a passenger vehicle.

== See also ==
- Two-foot-gauge railways in South Africa
