= Frederikstad =

- Location within North West (South African province) Location within South Africa
- Coordinates: 26.509°S 27.144°E
- Country: South Africa
- Province: North West
- District: Dr Kenneth Kaunda
- Municipality: JB Marks
- Time zone: UTC+2 (SAST)
- PO box: 2528
- Area code: 018

Frederikstad is a hamlet in South Africa some 34 km south-west of Carletonville and 23 km north of Potchefstroom. It was established in 1885 and named after Frederik Wolmarans. Fighting took place here during the Second Anglo-Boer War. The name is also encountered as Frederickstad.
