= Imvani =

- Location within Eastern Cape Location within South Africa
- Coordinates: 31.954°S 26.975°E
- Country: South Africa
- Province: Eastern Cape
- District: Chris Hani
- Municipality: Enoch Mgijima

Area
  - Total: 0.50 km^{2} (0.19 sq mi)

Population (2011)
  - Total: 460
  - Density: 920/km^{2} (2,400/sq mi)

Racial makeup (2011)
  - Black African: 99.6%
  - Other: 0.4%

First languages (2011)
  - Xhosa: 91.3%
  - English: 3.5%
  - Zulu: 1.5%
  - S. Ndebele: 1.3%
  - Other: 2.4%
- Time zone: UTC+2 (SAST)

Imvani is a settlement some 30 km north of Cathcart and 30 km west of St Marks, in Eastern Cape, South Africa. It takes its name from the river nearby which in turn was named after a type of wild asparagus, A. stipulacens, the roots of which are eaten either raw or cooked. The form iMvani has been approved.
