= Merrivale, KwaZulu-Natal =

Place that is in KwaZulu-Natal, South Africa

Merrivale
- Location within KwaZulu-Natal Location within South Africa
- Coordinates: 29.514°S 30.237°E
- Country: South Africa
- Province: KwaZulu-Natal
- District: uMgungundlovu
- Municipality: uMngeni
- Main Place: Howick

Area
  - Total: 3.08 km^{2} (1.19 sq mi)

Population (2011)
  - Total: 3,891
  - Density: 1,260/km^{2} (3,270/sq mi)

Racial makeup (2011)
  - Black African: 47.3%
  - Coloured: 15.3%
  - Indian/Asian: 9.1%
  - White: 28.0%
  - Other: 0.3%

First languages (2011)
  - English: 50.2%
  - Zulu: 38.0%
  - Afrikaans: 6.7%
  - Other: 5.2%
- Time zone: UTC+2 (SAST)
- Postal code (street): 3291
- PO box: 3291

Merrivale is a town in Umgungundlovu District Municipality in the KwaZulu-Natal province of South Africa.

Village 145 km north-west of Durban and 5 km south-east of Howick. Named after Herman Merrivale, Secretary of State for the Colonies in 1848.
