= Thornville, KwaZulu-Natal =

Thornville
- Location within KwaZulu-Natal Location within South Africa
- Coordinates: 29.683°S 30.483°E
- Country: South Africa
- Province: KwaZulu-Natal
- District: uMgungundlovu
- Municipality: Richmond

Area
  - Total: 3.37 km^{2} (1.30 sq mi)

Population (2011)
  - Total: 494
  - Density: 147/km^{2} (380/sq mi)

Racial makeup (2011)
  - Black African: 85.0%
  - Coloured: 1.6%
  - Indian/Asian: 1.8%
  - White: 10.3%
  - Other: 1.2%

First languages (2011)
  - Zulu: 55.3%
  - Xhosa: 19.8%
  - English: 14.2%
  - Afrikaans: 3.0%
  - Other: 7.7%
- Time zone: UTC+2 (SAST)
- PO box: 3760

Thornville is a town in Richmond Local Municipality in the KwaZulu-Natal province of South Africa.
