= Rosmead =

- Location within Eastern Cape Location within South Africa
- Coordinates: 31.484°S 25.118°E
- Country: South Africa
- Province: Eastern Cape
- District: Chris Hani
- Municipality: Inxuba Yethemba
- Time zone: UTC+2 (SAST)
- PO box: 5900

Rosmead is a village 12 km east of Middelburg and 75 km west-south-west of Steynsburg. It was founded in 1880 and at first named Middelburg Road, but renamed in 1883 after Sir Hercules George Robinson, Lord Rosmead (1824–1897), who was Governor of the Cape Colony from 1880 to 1889.
