= Donnybrook, KwaZulu-Natal =

Donnybrook
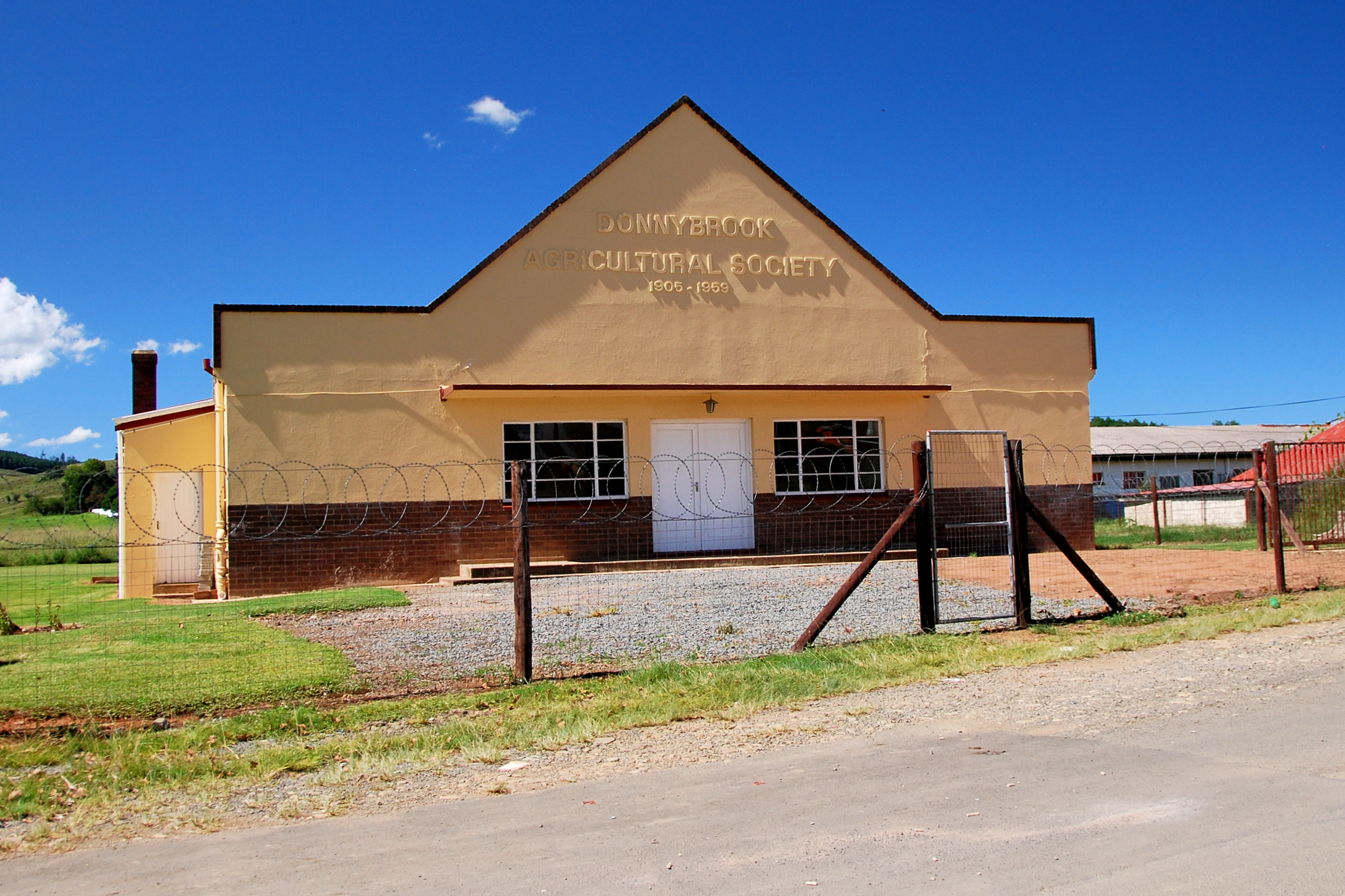
- A building in Donnybrook

- Location within KwaZulu-Natal Location within South Africa
- Coordinates: 29°45′S 30°0′E
- Country: South Africa
- Province: KwaZulu-Natal
- District: Harry Gwala
- Municipality: Dr Nkosazana Dlamini-Zuma

Area
  - Total: 15.10 km^{2} (5.83 sq mi)

Population (2011)
  - Total: 4,683
  - Density: 310.1/km^{2} (803.2/sq mi)

Racial makeup (2011)
  - Black African: 98.4%
  - Coloured: 0.3%
  - Indian/Asian: 0.3%
  - White: 0.4%
  - Other: 0.6%

First languages (2011)
  - Zulu: 92.8%
  - S. Ndebele: 1.5%
  - Tswana: 1.4%
  - Sotho: 1.1%
  - Other: 3.2%
- Time zone: UTC+2 (SAST)
- PO box: 3237
- Area code: 039

Donnybrook is a settlement in Harry Gwala District Municipality in the KwaZulu-Natal province of South Africa.

The village is some 80 km southwest of Pietermaritzburg. It was named after Donnybrook, a suburb of Dublin, by Robert Comrie, the owner of the farm on which it was laid out.

Until the mid-1980s, it was the northern terminus of the Umzinto – Donnybrook narrow gauge railway.
