= Alicedale =

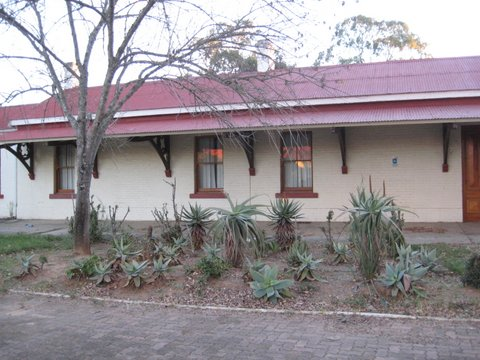
- Alicedale Old Railway Station

- Location within Eastern Cape Location within South Africa
- Coordinates: 33°19′S 26°5′E
- Country: South Africa
- Province: Eastern Cape
- District: Sarah Baartman
- Municipality: Makana

Area
  - Total: 4.7 km^{2} (1.8 sq mi)

Population (2011)
  - Total: 3,872
  - Density: 820/km^{2} (2,100/sq mi)

Racial makeup (2011)
  - Black African: 57.1%
  - Coloured: 40.9%
  - Indian/Asian: 0.3%
  - White: 1.2%
  - Other: 0.5%

First languages (2011)
  - Xhosa: 51.9%
  - Afrikaans: 43.7%
  - English: 2.2%
  - Other: 2.1%
- Time zone: UTC+2 (SAST)
- Postal code (street): 6135
- PO box: 6135
- Area code: 042

Alicedale is a small settlement in Sarah Baartman District Municipality in the Eastern Cape province of South Africa, situated on the banks of the Bushmans River.

== Railway History ==
Alicedale is a railway junction on the main railway line between Johannesburg and Port Elizabeth. From here a branch line leads to Grahamstown. The town was a railway training facility during the previous two centuries, from there the historical red facebrick building that now houses the reception of the resort hotel. The town was named for Mrs. Alice Slessor, (Note: A number of sources including Raper assert that Alice Slessor's maiden name was Dale. This is incorrect, the record of their marriage at St John's Church in the Parish of Paddington, on 10 September 1867 clearly indicates that Alice's name was Malton and that she was a spinster at the time of her marriage.) the wife of the engineer in charge of construction of the railways.

== Buildings of interest ==
- Bushmans River Sands Hotel in Alicedale had an 18-hole golf course.Due to COVID it closed
- St Barnabas Anglican Church was dedicated in 1887 and regular Anglican worship still takes place in the church.

The nearest neighbouring towns are Riebeek East and Paterson, while Grahamstown lies 45 kilometres (28 mi) to the east.
