= List of Ezemvelo KZN Wildlife Protected Areas =

Protected areas managed by Ezemvelo KZN Wildlife in South Africa

Ezemvelo KZN Wildlife (officially the KwaZulu-Natal Nature Conservation Board) manages over 120 protected areas in KwaZulu-Natal, South Africa, including two UNESCO World Heritage Sites. The organisation was formed through the merger of the former Natal Parks Board (established 1947) and the KwaZulu Directorate of Nature Conservation (established 1972) following the democratic elections of 1994. This list organises the protected areas by geographic region.

== World Heritage Sites ==
=== Maloti-Drakensberg Park ===
The uKhahlamba Drakensberg Park is a UNESCO World Heritage Site forming part of the transboundary Maloti-Drakensberg Park shared with Lesotho. It was inscribed on the World Heritage List on 29 November 2000 under both natural and cultural criteria, becoming South Africa's first mixed World Heritage Site. The park comprises multiple component reserves along the Drakensberg escarpment, covering 242,813 hectares and containing over 600 rock art sites with an estimated 35,000 individual San paintings.

Maloti-Drakensberg Park components
Reserve	Coordinates	Area (ha)	Established	Notes
Bushman's Nek	29.8500°S 29.1000°E			Lesotho border post
Cathedral Peak	29.0500°S 29.2167°E	35,000		Didima Camp
Cobham	29.6333°S 29.3500°E	52,000		Southern Drakensberg
Garden Castle	29.7500°S 29.2333°E			Rhino Peak access
Giant's Castle	29.2167°S 29.3833°E	34,638	1903	Lammergeier hide
Highmoor	29.3833°S 29.5333°E	15,000		High-altitude wetlands
Himeville	29.5500°S 29.5167°E			Small municipal reserve
Injisuthi	29.1833°S 29.4167°E			Battle Cave rock art
Kamberg	29.3667°S 29.3833°E			Game Pass Shelter rock art
Lotheni	29.4500°S 29.4667°E			Trout fishing
Monks Cowl	29.0333°S 29.3667°E			Champagne Castle access
Royal Natal	28.6833°S 28.9500°E	8,094	1916	The Amphitheatre
Rugged Glen	28.8000°S 29.0167°E			Adjacent to Royal Natal
uMkhomazi	29.5833°S 29.5000°E			Wilderness area
Vergelegen	29.5167°S 29.6167°E			Remote wilderness

=== iSimangaliso Wetland Park ===
The iSimangaliso Wetland Park was declared South Africa's first UNESCO World Heritage Site on 1 December 1999. The park encompasses 239,566 hectares of diverse ecosystems including coral reefs, beaches, coastal dunes, lake systems, swamps, and wetlands. It contains four Ramsar wetland sites and is managed by the iSimangaliso Wetland Park Authority. The word isimangaliso means "a miracle" or "something wondrous" in Zulu.

iSimangaliso Wetland Park sections
Section	Coordinates	Area (ha)	Notes
Cape Vidal	28.3833°S 32.4167°E		Snorkelling, fishing
Charters Creek	28.3667°S 32.0833°E		Western shore bush camp
Eastern Shores	28.0000°S 32.3500°E		Mission Rocks
False Bay	28.1667°S 32.0500°E		Ramsar site since 2015
Fani's Island	28.3500°S 32.1333°E		Boat access only
Kosi Bay	26.9167°S 32.8167°E		Traditional fish traps
Maphelane	28.5333°S 32.4500°E		World's highest forested dunes
uMkhuze	27.6167°S 32.2333°E	40,000	Big 5, birding hotspot
Ozabeni	27.3333°S 32.5500°E		Remote wilderness section
Sodwana Bay	27.5500°S 32.5500°E		Southernmost coral reefs
St Lucia Estuary	28.3833°S 32.4000°E		Largest estuarine system in Africa

== Major Game Reserves ==
=== Hluhluwe–iMfolozi Park ===
The Hluhluwe–iMfolozi Park is Africa's oldest proclaimed game reserve, established in 1895. The park covers approximately 96,000 hectares and is renowned for saving the southern white rhinoceros from extinction through Operation Rhino in the 1950s and 1960s. It is the only state-run park in KwaZulu-Natal where all of the Big Five occur and is the flagship park of Ezemvelo KZN Wildlife.

Hluhluwe–iMfolozi Park sections
Section	Coordinates	Area (ha)	Established	Notes
Hluhluwe	28.0500°S 32.0500°E	23,067	1895	Northern section
iMfolozi	28.3500°S 31.9000°E	47,753	1895	Southern section, wilderness trails

== Zululand and Maputaland ==
The northern reaches of KwaZulu-Natal include several significant reserves protecting subtropical ecosystems and supporting communities of African elephant, Nyala, and other wildlife.

Zululand and Maputaland reserves
Reserve	Coordinates	Area (ha)	Established	Notes
Isandlwana	28.3500°S 30.6500°E			Anglo-Zulu War battlefield heritage site
Ithala	27.5000°S 31.2500°E	29,653	1972	Mountainous reserve, black & white rhino
Ndumo	26.9000°S 32.3167°E	10,117	1924	Over 430 bird species
Ophathe	28.3000°S 31.6000°E	7,500		Big 5 reserve
Phongolo	27.3833°S 31.9000°E			Pongolapoort Dam surrounds
Tembe	26.8500°S 32.4333°E	30,000	1983	Largest elephants in South Africa

== Coastal Reserves ==
KwaZulu-Natal's coastline features numerous small to medium-sized reserves protecting coastal forest, mangroves, and dune ecosystems.

Coastal reserves
Reserve	Coordinates	Area (ha)	Established	Notes
Amatikulu	29.1167°S 31.4500°E	2,020	1922	Coastal forest, reedbuck
Beachwood Mangroves	29.7833°S 31.0500°E	76	1951	Mangrove ecosystem
Bluff	29.9167°S 31.0000°E	45		Durban coastal forest
Harold Johnson	29.2167°S 31.4667°E	100	1956	Tugela River mouth
Mpenjati	30.9667°S 30.2833°E	66	1988	South Coast, Blue Flag beach
Skyline	29.8500°S 31.0500°E	90	1979	Coastal grassland
Umhlanga Lagoon	29.7333°S 31.0833°E	26	1971	Coastal forest & mangroves
Umlalazi	28.9500°S 31.7667°E	1,028	1948	Mangrove boardwalk, raffia palms

== South Coast ==
The South Coast region features dramatic landscapes including the Oribi Gorge and Umtamvuna river gorges.

South Coast reserves
Reserve	Coordinates	Area (ha)	Established	Notes
Oribi Gorge	30.7167°S 30.2667°E	1,837	1950	Deep gorge, oribi, samango monkey
Umtamvuna	31.0667°S 30.1667°E	3,257	1971	Pondoland endemic centre
Vernon Crookes	30.2833°S 30.6000°E	2,189	1973	Coastal scarp forest

== Durban Metropolitan ==
Several reserves are located within or adjacent to the eThekwini Metropolitan Municipality, providing green spaces and biodiversity conservation within the urban environment.

Durban Metropolitan reserves
Reserve	Coordinates	Area (ha)	Established	Notes
Kenneth Stainbank	29.9000°S 30.8833°E	253	1966	Zebra, impala, bushbuck
Krantzkloof	29.7833°S 30.8167°E	600	1950	Krantzkloof Gorge trails
North Park	29.7667°S 30.8500°E	52		Urban nature reserve

== Midlands and Interior ==
The KwaZulu-Natal Midlands and interior regions feature grassland, wetland, and mistbelt forest reserves at higher elevations.

Midlands and Interior reserves
Reserve	Coordinates	Area (ha)	Established	Notes
Chelmsford	27.9500°S 30.1333°E	6,053	1979	Chelmsford Dam, wildebeest
Enseleni	28.6667°S 32.0000°E	293		Swamp forest
Impendle	29.6333°S 29.6667°E	5,029		Montane grassland
Midmar	29.5167°S 30.2000°E	1,013	1965	Midmar Dam recreation
Moor Park	29.4500°S 30.1167°E	203		Mistbelt grassland
Mount Currie	30.5500°S 29.4500°E	1,857	1976	Highland grassland
Ntsikeni	30.0500°S 29.5833°E	9,287		Wattled crane, wetland
Queen Elizabeth Park	29.5833°S 30.2833°E	93	1971	Near Pietermaritzburg, zebra
Spioenkop	28.7000°S 29.4500°E	5,700	1975	Anglo-Boer War battlefield, rhino
Vryheid Hill	27.7500°S 30.7833°E	300		Town nature reserve
Wagendrift	28.9000°S 29.8500°E	1,893		Wagendrift Dam
Weenen	28.8500°S 30.0833°E	4,904	1975	Black & white rhino, buffalo

== Forest Reserves ==
KwaZulu-Natal contains significant patches of indigenous forest, including rare scarp and mist-belt forests.

Forest reserves
Reserve	Coordinates	Area (ha)	Established	Notes
Bulwer Forest Complex	29.7333°S 29.7500°E			Southern KZN mistbelt
Dlinza	28.8833°S 31.4500°E	250		Aerial boardwalk, spotted thrush
Entumeni	28.9000°S 31.3333°E	560	1910	Rare trees, samango monkey
Hlathikhulu	29.0500°S 31.2667°E	1,655		Scarp forest
Karkloof	29.3500°S 30.2833°E	1,900		Blue duiker, samango monkey
Nkandla	28.7333°S 31.1333°E	1,500		Mistbelt & scarp forest
Ongoye	28.8167°S 31.7000°E	4,000		Green barbet endemic

== Other Protected Areas ==
Additional reserves managed by Ezemvelo KZN Wildlife:

Other protected areas
Reserve	Coordinates	Area (ha)	Established	Notes
Blinkwater	28.4833°S 29.6500°E	2,800		Grassland reserve
Coleford	29.9000°S 29.7167°E	1,293		Wetland, oribi
Mbumbazi	29.5000°S 30.8000°E			Valley bushveld
Ncandu	27.5333°S 29.9000°E	800		Highveld grassland
Sileza	27.2500°S 31.8833°E	800		Sand forest
uMngeni Vlei	29.5000°S 30.0000°E	876		Wetland, wattled crane

== See also ==
- Ezemvelo KZN Wildlife
- Protected areas of South Africa
- South African National Parks
- List of protected areas of South Africa
