= Mvoti to Umzimkulu Water Management Area =

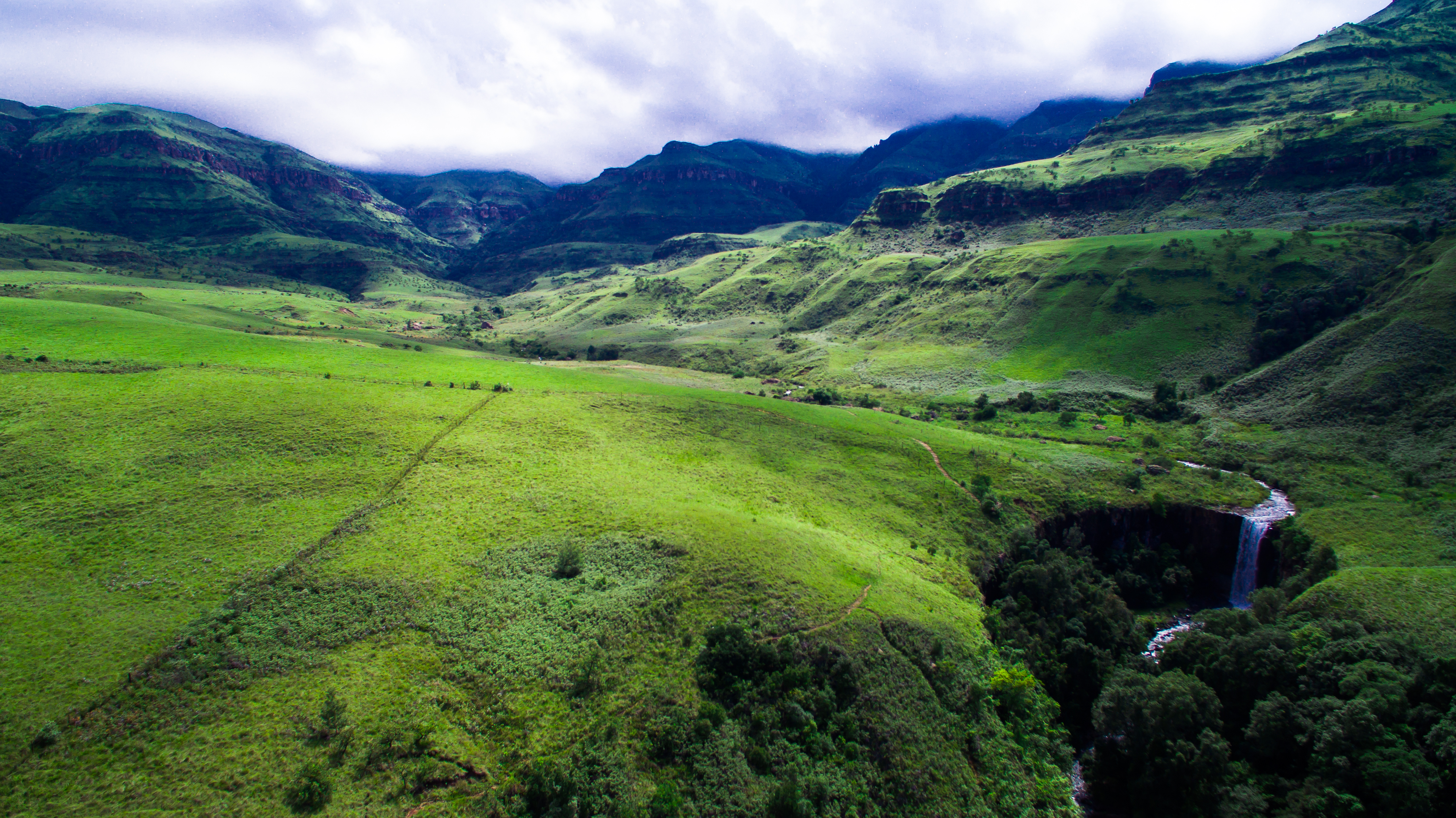
Sterkspruit Falls with the foothills of the Drakensberg in the background.

Mvoti to Umzimkulu WMA, or Mvoti to Umzimkulu Water Management Area (coded: 11), Includes the following major rivers: the Mvoti River, uThongathi River, uMdloti River, Ohlanga River, Mngeni River, Sterkspruit River, iLovu River, uMkomazi River, Mzimayi River, uMzimkhulu River and Mtamvuna River and covers the following Dams:

- Albert Falls Dam Mgeni River
- Hazelmere Dam Mdloti River
- Inanda Dam Mgeni River
- Midmar Dam Mgeni River
- Nagle Dam Mgeni River

== Boundaries ==
Primary drainage region U and tertiary drainage regions T40, T51 and T52.
