= UMgeni Vlei Nature Reserve =

Protected Ramsar wetland in KZN, South Africa

uMgeni Vlei Nature Reserve
- Location of the park near the UKhahlamba-Drakensberg Park
- Location: KwaZulu-Natal, South Africa
- Coordinates: 29°29′28″S 29°49′47″E
- Area: 958 ha (2,370 acres)

Ramsar Wetland
- Official name: uMgeni Vlei Nature Reserve
- Designated: 19 March 2013
- Reference no.: 2132
- UMgeni Vlei Nature Reserve (South Africa)

The uMgeni Vlei Nature Reserve is a wetland reserve in KwaZulu-Natal, South Africa that protects several threatened bird species.

== Location ==
The reserve lies 22 km southwest of Nottingham Road, southwest of Fort Nottingham and the Fort Nottingham Nature Reserve, west-northwest of Pietermaritzburg, east of Maloti-Drakensberg Park, and southeast of Empisini Nature Reserve. It lies 1,840 m above sea level.

== Visiting ==
The reserve is not freely accessible to the public. It lies between farms and entry is difficult. Permits must be obtained ahead of time and are usually only granted to researchers.

== The reserve ==
The reserve covers 958 hectares, of which half consists of permanent marshes, pools, and swamps. The other half is covered in reeds, grass, and shrubbery. Mist and clouds are prevalent and lightning strikes more often than anywhere else in the country. Rainfall from 800 to 1,000 mm/yr is normal, mostly falling in the summer. This is the source of the uMgeni River which supplies Durban and Pietermaritzburg through the Midmar Dam, Albert Falls Dam, Nagle Dam, and Inanda Dam. In 1987, the Natal Parks Board took possession of the area to protect the wattled crane, and in 2013, the park became a Ramsar site. Due to good cooperation with neighbouring farmers, the latter can graze their cattle and sheep at select times on the reserve's grasslands. Poachers and invasive plants present a problem. The wattled crane and the black-backed jackal remain threatened.

== Flora and fauna ==
The following birds can be found in the reserve: wattled crane, grey crowned crane, blue crane, white-winged flufftail, African grass owl, yellow-breasted pipit, secretarybird, ground woodpecker, buff-streaked chat, sentinel rock-thrush, Drakensberg rockjumper, Cape vulture, bearded vulture, and pale-headed grass singer. Among mammals here is the threatened oribi. The medicinal plant Merwilla natalenis and several species of red-hot pokers (Kniphofia) are native, but the sand blackberry (Rubus cuneifolius) is invasive.

== See also ==
Ramsar Convention
