= Umfolozi =

Umfolozi may refer to:

- Umfolozi (House of Assembly of South Africa constituency)
- Umfolozi Game Reserve
- UMfolozi Local Municipality
- Umfolozi River
- Black Umfolozi River
- White Umfolozi River

== See also ==
- Ufology
