= Queen Elizabeth Park Nature Reserve =

Protected area in South Africa

- IUCN category IV (habitat/species management area)
- Location within South Africa
- Location: Montrose, Pietermaritzburg, KwaZulu-Natal, South Africa
- Nearest city: Pietermaritzburg
- Coordinates: 29°34′21″S 30°19′30″E
- Area: 93 ha (230 acres)
- Established: 3 June 1960
- Governing body: Ezemvelo KZN Wildlife

Queen Elizabeth Park Nature Reserve is a 93-hectare protected area located in the Montrose suburb of Pietermaritzburg, the capital city of KwaZulu-Natal Province, South Africa. Established in 1960, the reserve functions as the administrative headquarters of Ezemvelo KZN Wildlife, the provincial conservation authority responsible for biodiversity management and protected area administration throughout KwaZulu-Natal.

== History ==
=== Establishment ===
Queen Elizabeth Park Nature Reserve was formally proclaimed on 3 June 1960 under Provincial Ordinance No. 35 of 1947. The reserve was established primarily to provide a permanent site for the headquarters of the Natal Parks, Game and Fish Preservation Board, which was subsequently renamed the Natal Parks Board. The land upon which the reserve is situated is held under lease from the Pietermaritzburg municipal authority.

The proclamation of the reserve occurred during a period of significant expansion in South Africa's protected area network, reflecting growing awareness of biodiversity conservation needs in the mid-20th century.

=== Conservation legacy ===
The Natal Parks Board, headquartered at Queen Elizabeth Park from its establishment, achieved international recognition for its pioneering conservation work. Most notably, the organization played a critical role in saving the southern white rhinoceros (Ceratotherium simum simum) from extinction. By the early 20th century, this subspecies had been reduced to fewer than 100 individuals confined to the Hluhluwe-iMfolozi Park complex in Zululand. Through intensive protection and the innovative "Operation Rhino" translocation program initiated in the 1960s under the leadership of Dr. Ian Player, the population recovered substantially. Today, all southern white rhinoceros worldwide—numbering over 20,000 individuals—are descended from this remnant population.

In 1998, following political restructuring in post-apartheid South Africa, the Natal Parks Board merged with the KwaZulu Department of Nature Conservation to form what eventually became Ezemvelo KZN Wildlife.

== Geography ==
=== Location and boundaries ===
The reserve is situated in the Montrose suburb, approximately 5.75 kilometers north of Pietermaritzburg's central business district. Its official address is 1 Peter Brown Drive, Montrose, Pietermaritzburg, 3201. The reserve occupies a position on the northern slopes overlooking the city.

Geographic boundaries are defined by the N3 National Highway along the western perimeter and the Victoria Country Club golf course on the eastern boundary. The reserve falls within the administrative jurisdiction of both the uMgungundlovu District Municipality and the Msunduzi Local Municipality.

=== Regional context ===
Queen Elizabeth Park is embedded within a network of protected areas in the greater Pietermaritzburg region. Proximate conservation areas include Doreen Clark Nature Reserve, located 3.2 kilometers to the west, and Midmar Nature Reserve, situated 14.7 kilometers to the northwest.

== Physical environment ==
=== Climate ===
The reserve experiences a subtropical climate characteristic of the KwaZulu-Natal Midlands, situated at the edge of the Natal Mistbelt. The region receives predominantly summer rainfall, with dry winter months and wet summers frequently accompanied by convective thunderstorms. Average annual temperatures range between 16.3°C and 17.9°C. Elevation and topography significantly influence local climatic patterns, with higher-lying areas experiencing cooler temperatures and increased precipitation.

=== Topography ===
The reserve's terrain encompasses the northern slopes of Pietermaritzburg, contributing to topographic heterogeneity and associated habitat diversity within the relatively small protected area.

== Biodiversity ==
=== Vegetation ===
Despite its modest size of 93 hectares, Queen Elizabeth Park exhibits considerable vegetation diversity, encompassing forest patches, thicket communities, open woodland, and grassland. This mosaic of habitat types reflects the transitional nature of the Mistbelt region and contributes to the reserve's biodiversity value.

The vegetation composition aligns with broader vegetation patterns documented for the KwaZulu-Natal region. Indigenous plant communities are interspersed with exotic species, a pattern common in peri-urban protected areas.

Of particular botanical significance is the presence of several cycad species, which represent ancient plant lineages of conservation importance.

=== Fauna ===
==== Mammals ====
The reserve supports populations of several antelope species and other herbivorous mammals adapted to the grassland-woodland mosaic. Documented species include:

- Plains zebra (Equus quagga)
- Blesbok (Damaliscus pygargus phillipsi)
- Impala (Aepyceros melampus)
- Bushbuck (Tragelaphus scriptus)
- Common duiker (Sylvicapra grimmia)
- Blue duiker (Philantomba monticola)—a forest-dwelling species of conservation interest
- Rock hyrax (Procavia capensis)
- Vervet monkey (Chlorocebus pygerythrus)

The blue duiker represents a notable record given its specialized habitat requirements and relatively restricted distribution within the region.

==== Avifauna ====
Queen Elizabeth Park has been documented as an important birding locality within the Pietermaritzburg metropolitan area. The diversity of habitats supports a varied avian assemblage. Noteworthy species recorded within the reserve include:

- Crowned eagle (Stephanoaetus coronatus)—an apex predator of forested habitats
- African emerald cuckoo (Chrysococcyx cupreus)
- Olive woodpecker (Dendropicos griseocephalus)
- Tawny-flanked prinia (Prinia subflava)
- Drakensberg prinia (Prinia hypoxantha)
- Multiple canary species (Serinus spp.)
- Various weaver species (Ploceidae)
- Common waxbill (Estrilda astrild)
- Zitting cisticola (Cisticola juncidis)

== Conservation significance ==
=== Protected area status ===
Queen Elizabeth Park is classified as a Category IV Protected Area in accordance with the International Union for Conservation of Nature (IUCN) protected area management categories, specifically designated as a Habitat/Species Management Area under the Environment Conservation Act No. 73 of 1989.

The reserve forms part of South Africa's National Protected Area Expansion Strategy (NPAES), developed by the Department of Environmental Affairs. The NPAES provides a strategic framework for expanding and consolidating the national protected area system to ensure adequate representation of all vegetation types and maintenance of ecological processes.

=== Flora of conservation concern ===
The reserve harbors the Hilton daisy (Gerbera aurantiaca), a grassland endemic species of significant conservation concern. First scientifically described by Schulz Bipontinus in 1844 from specimens collected by the German botanical explorer Christian Ferdinand Krauss near Pietermaritzburg in 1839, this species has undergone substantial population decline and range contraction.

Gerbera aurantiaca is restricted to the high-rainfall mistbelt grasslands of KwaZulu-Natal and Mpumalanga provinces—habitat that has experienced extensive transformation due to commercial forestry, agricultural expansion, and urban development. The species is currently listed as Endangered. Research has documented that only approximately 30 small, fragmented populations persist across the species' historical range.

The Hilton daisy exhibits striking floral color polymorphism, with capitula ranging from yellow through orange to deep scarlet red. Flowering occurs primarily from September to November. Recent molecular and ecological research has investigated the geographical variation in flower color across populations, examining potential roles of pollinator-mediated selection and edaphic factors in maintaining this variation.

Conservation efforts for G. aurantiaca have included ex situ cultivation programs and population biology studies conducted by the KwaZulu-Natal National Botanical Garden and academic institutions. The species has been designated as a flagship for mistbelt grassland conservation.

== Visitor facilities ==
Queen Elizabeth Park provides day-use recreational facilities for public visitation. Amenities include three designated picnic areas equipped with braai (barbecue) facilities and ablution blocks. The iDube Trail, a self-guided circular walking route, offers visitors opportunities for nature observation and scenic views overlooking Pietermaritzburg. The trail's name derives from the isiZulu word for zebra, reflecting the species' presence within the reserve.

Vehicular access is provided via paved internal roads suitable for scenic driving. Entry to the reserve is free of charge. No overnight accommodation facilities are available on-site.

The reserve maintains a small environmental education center that conducts regular workshops and educational programs throughout the year, serving schools and community groups from the greater Natal Midlands region.

== See also ==
- Ezemvelo KZN Wildlife
- List of protected areas of South Africa
- KwaZulu-Natal Midlands
- Pietermaritzburg
- Gerbera aurantiaca
- Operation Rhino
