= Impendle Nature Reserve =

- IUCN category IV (habitat/species management area)
- Interactive map of Impendle Nature Reserve
- Location: Impendle, KwaZulu-Natal, South Africa
- Nearest city: Impendle / Howick
- Coordinates: 29°37′20″S 29°54′30″E
- Area: 3,046 ha (7,530 acres)
- Established: 1983
- Governing body: Ezemvelo KZN Wildlife

Impendle Nature Reserve is a 3,046-hectare (7,530-acre) protected area situated near the town of Impendle in the KwaZulu-Natal Midlands, South Africa. Managed by Ezemvelo KZN Wildlife, the reserve is a critical biodiversity site primarily dedicated to the preservation of high-altitude Midlands Mistbelt Grasslands and the protection of the endangered wattled crane.

== Geography and ecology ==
The reserve is located on the foothills of the Drakensberg escarpment, characterized by a mosaic of undulating grasslands, steep dolerite ridges, and localized wetlands. The altitude varies between 1,200 m and 1,600 m above sea level, contributing to a high-rainfall, mist-prone climate.

The reserve protects a significant portion of the Midlands Mistbelt Grassland, a vegetation type that is considered critically endangered due to historical transformation for timber plantations and agriculture.

== History ==
The reserve was formally proclaimed in 1983 under the Nature Conservation Ordinance (No. 15 of 1974). Its establishment was largely driven by the need to secure a breeding sanctuary for the wattled crane (Grus carunculatus), as the area contains several of the few remaining functional breeding wetlands for the species in South Africa.

== Biodiversity ==
=== Avifauna ===
Impendle is an "Important Bird and Biodiversity Area" (IBA). It is most notable for its population of wattled cranes, with several pairs known to nest within the reserve's wetlands. Other species of conservation concern include:

- Grey crowned crane and Blue crane.
- Southern ground hornbill.
- Black-winged lapwing and Buff-streaked chat.

=== Flora ===
The grasslands are exceptionally diverse, containing numerous endemic wildflowers and orchids. Rare plant species recorded include Gerbera aurantiaca (the Hilton Daisy) and various species of Watsonia.

=== Fauna ===
Mammals found within the reserve include the endangered Oribi, Common reedbuck, Bushbuck, and Grey rhebok. The reserve also serves as a habitat for the rare long-toed tree frog (Leptopelis xenodactylus).

== Tourism and access ==
Due to its primary status as a sensitive breeding sanctuary for cranes, tourism infrastructure at Impendle is minimal. Access is generally restricted to researchers and birdwatching groups by prior arrangement with Ezemvelo KZN Wildlife to ensure minimal disturbance to nesting sites.
