= Umzimkulu River =

Mzimkhulu River Umzimkhulu, uMzimkhulu, Mzimkhulu
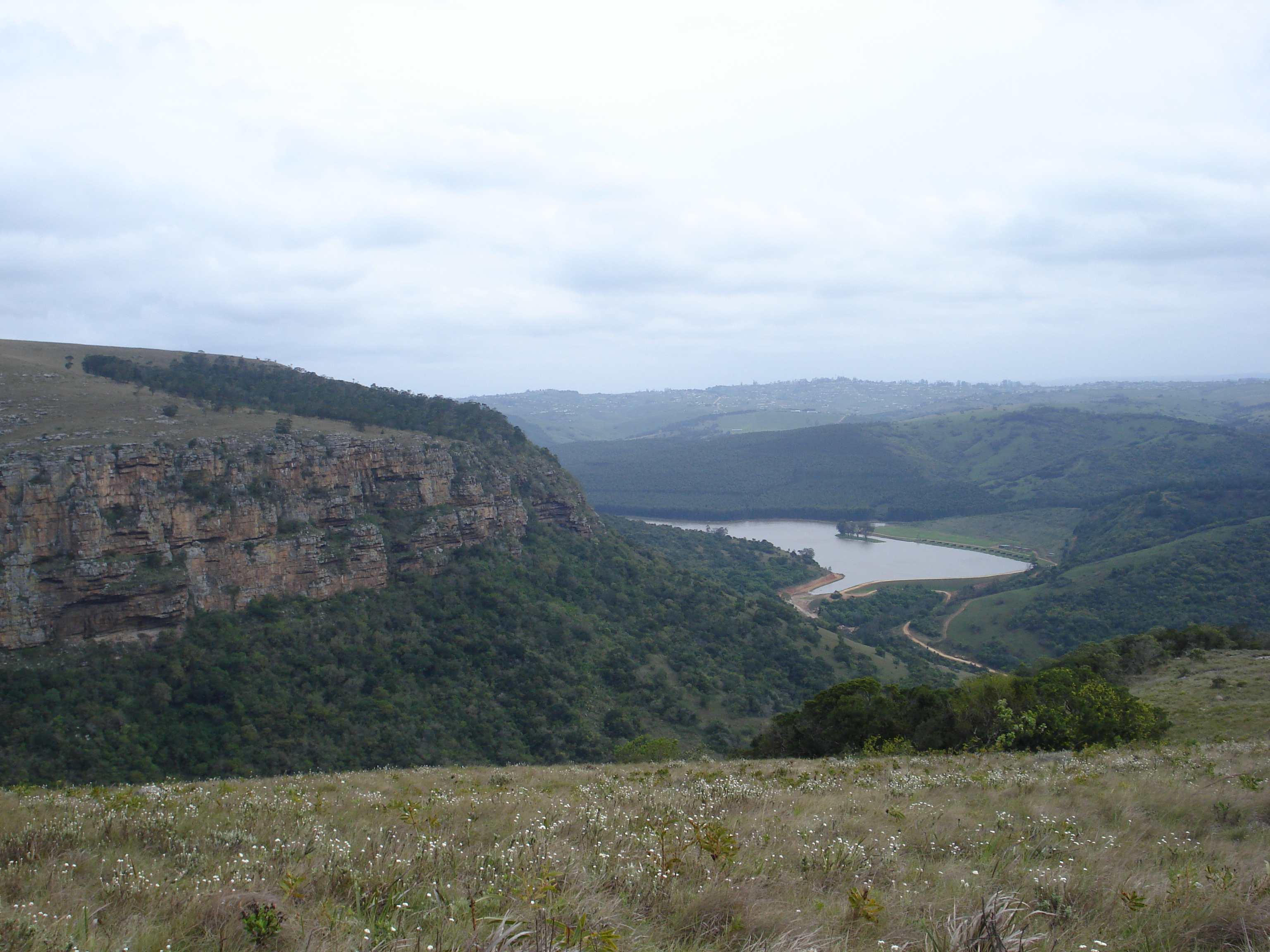
- Umzimkulu river scene

- Location of the Umzimkhulu River mouth
- Etymology: Meaning 'big place', 'large home', ie of the waters, in the Xhosa language and Zulu language

Location
- Country: South Africa
- Region: KwaZulu-Natal

Physical characteristics
- Source: _
  - location: Drakensberg
- Source confluence: Ngwangwane / Underberg
  - coordinates: 30°03′24″S 29°47′26″E
  - elevation: 943 m (3,094 ft)
- Mouth: Indian Ocean
  - location: Port Shepstone
  - coordinates: 30°44′12″S 30°27′25″E
  - elevation: 0 m (0 ft)

The Mzimkulu River is a river in South Africa. In the past, the Mzimkulu formed part of the border between Eastern Cape and KwaZulu-Natal provinces. Presently this river is part of the Mvoti to Umzimkulu Water Management Area. In late February of every year, the river is host to one of South Africa's most popular canoe races, the Drak Challenge.

== Course ==
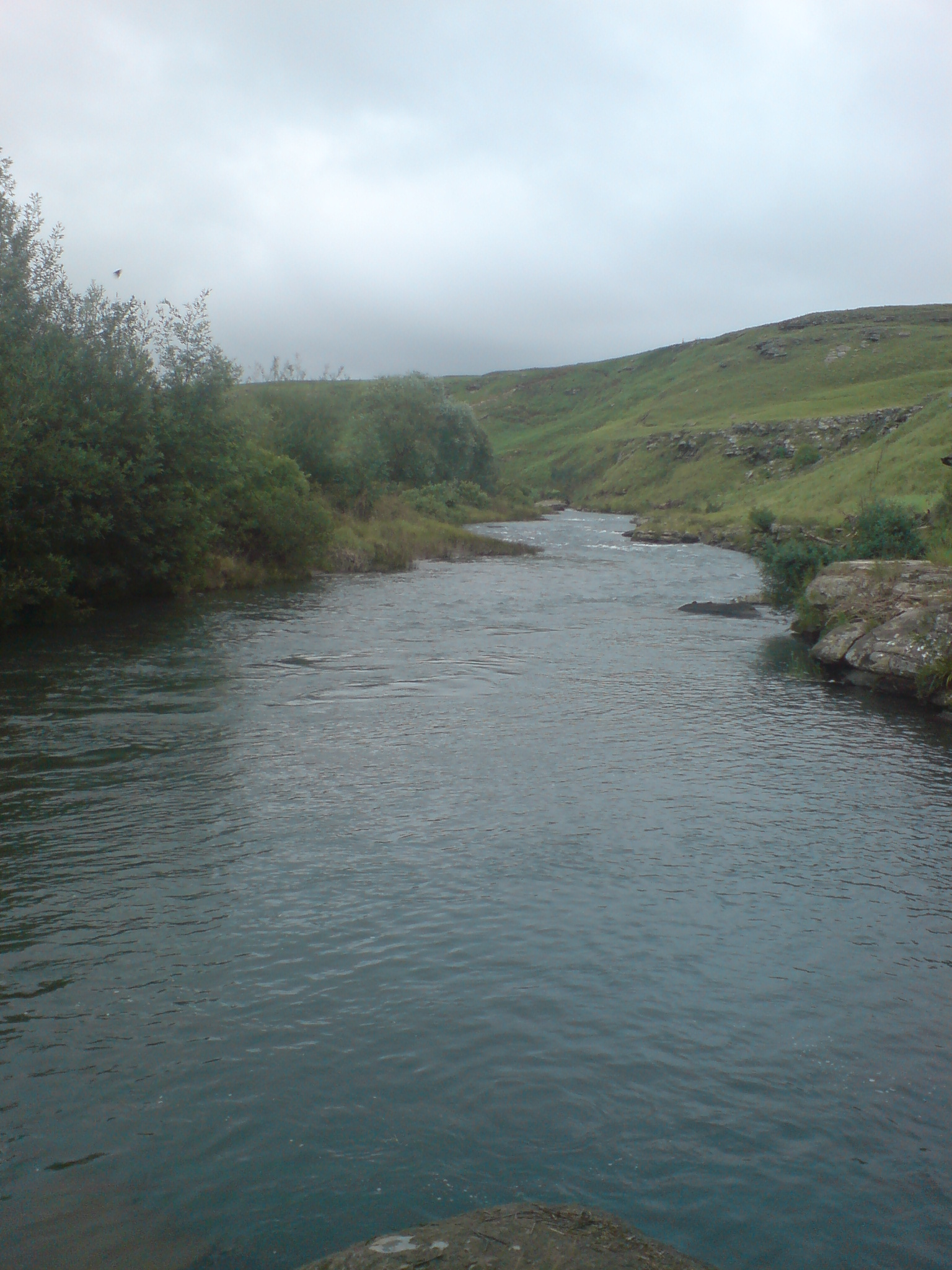
Mzimkulu River near Underberg

It rises in the Drakensberg mountains just north of Rhino Peak, with the source being on the Lesotho border. It flows southeast towards the Indian Ocean, which it enters through an estuary at Port Shepstone. Its main tributary is the Bisi River which joins its right bank about halfway down its course. Towns on the Umzimkulu include Underberg and Umzimkhulu.

== Ecology ==
The scaly yellowfish (Labeobarbus natalensis) is a fish found in the Umzimkulu River System as well as in the Umgeni, Umkomazi, Thukela and the Umfolozi. It is a common endemic species in KwaZulu-Natal Province and it lives in different habitats between the Drakensberg foothills and the coastal lowlands.

== See also ==
- List of rivers of South Africa
- List of estuaries of South Africa
