= Midmar Nature Reserve =

Nature reserve in KwaZulu-Natal, South Africa

Coordinates: 29°30′03″S 30°12′05″E

Midmar Nature Reserve, also known as Midmar Dam Nature Reserve, is a protected area around Midmar Dam on the Umgeni River. It is situated near to Howick in KwaZulu-Natal, South Africa.

== Activities ==
Include water sports, cycling, walking, game viewing and angling. Midmar hosts the annual Midmar Mile, a large open-water swimming event.

== See also ==
- Protected areas of South Africa
