= Streptomyces polyantibioticus =

Scientific classification
- Domain: Bacteria
- Kingdom: Bacillati
- Phylum: Actinomycetota
- Class: Actinomycetes
- Order: Streptomycetales
- Family: Streptomycetaceae
- Genus: Streptomyces
- Species: S. polyantibioticus

Binomial name
- Streptomyces polyantibioticus le Roes-Hill and Meyers 2009

Type strain
- DSM 44925, NRRL B-24448, SPR

Synonyms
- Streptoallomorpha polyantibiotica

Species of bacterium

Streptomyces polyantibioticus is a bacterium species from the genus of Streptomyces which has been isolated from soil from a riverbank from the Umgeni River from the KwaZulu-Natal Province in South Africa.

== See also ==
- List of Streptomyces species
