= Sander Berk =

Dutch triathlete

Sander Johannes Gerardes Berk (born July 10, 1979 in Nieuwveen) is a Dutch triathlete.

Berk won his first run-bike-run event as a junior on March 26, 1995 in Langedijk. That same year he also became Dutch Junior Triathlon Champion in Waarland and he won triathlon races in Aalsmeer and Spijkenisse. He added another two run-bike-run wins in Molenschot and Uithoorn. In 1996 he won a race in Leiden and he defended his triathlon title in Aalsmeer. After winning a run-bike-run in Steenwijk and a triathlon in Xanten in 1997 he did not succeed in any race in 1998. In 1999, his last year as a junior he became Dutch run-bike-run champion in Venray. He also won a run-bike-run in Uithoorn and a triathlon in Enschede.

His senior career started well with a triathlon win in Ouderkerk aan de Amstel as well as a run-bike-run win in Uithoorn. He defended his Uithoorn title in 2001 and also won a triathlon in Vinkeveen. His first international triathlon win as a senior came in South Africa in 2002, when he won the race in Klerksdorp. Besides becoming Dutch national champion in 2003 he also won two triathlons in Leuven and Aalsmeer. In Aalsmeer he also won an aquathlon and he won another race in Amersfoort. His biggest successes in 2004 were in Belgium where he won the team triathlon in Wachtebeke and the individual triathlon in Antoing. He also succeeded in the Aalsmeer triathlon again.

After some injuries in 2005 he returned into competition in 2006 winning two duathlons in Klerksdorp and Pretoria, both in South Africa. Again he was able to win the Aalsmeer triathlon and also in that year he and his team mates won the team triathlon in Enschede. 2007 was his best year to date in his career with a total of eight triathlon wins (Potchefstroom (twice), Amsterdam, Aalsmeer, Germiston, Midmar Dam, Roodeplaat Dam and Vanderbijlpark). He also won the Resolution Health-Energade Series. With a win in Stein and some other good results in Bloemfontein and Richards Bay Berk qualified himself for the 2008 Summer Olympics in Beijing.

== Career highlights ==
Bronze Triathlon, Potchefstroom, 22-01-2000
Silver Triathlon, Almere, 18-06-2000
Bronze Triathlon, Mol, 10-09-2000
Gold Triathlon, Ouderkerk aan de Amstel, 17-09-2000
Gold Run-bike-run, Uithoorn, 22-10-2000
Bronze Triathlon, Holten, Dutch Championships, 07-07-2001
Gold Triathlon, Vinkeveen, 05-08-2001
Silver Triathlon, Aalsmeer, 26-08-2001
Gold Run-bike-run, Uithoorn, 14-10-2001
Gold Triathlon, Klerksdorp, 27-01-2002
Silver Triathlon, Aalsmeer, 25-08-2002
Gold Triathlon, Amersfoort, 23-03-2003
Gold Aquathlon, Aalsmeer, 10-05-2003
Bronze Triathlon, Geel, 18-05-2003
Gold Triathlon, Zundert, Dutch Championships, 01-06-2003
Gold Triathlon, Leuven, 08-06-2003
Gold Triathlon, Aalsmeer, 31-08-2003
Silver Triathlon, Bloemfontein, 28-02-2004
Gold Team Triathlon, Wachtebeke, 01-05-2004
Silver Triathlon, Zundert, Dutch Championships, 06-06-2004
Silver Triathlon, Vilvoorde, 21-07-2004
Gold Triathlon, Antoing, 25-07-2004
Silver Triathlon, Lough Neagh, 14-08-2004
Bronze Triathlon, Weiswampach, 22-08-2004
Gold Triathlon, Aalsmeer, 29-08-2004
Silver Triathlon, Mol, 05-09-2004
Bronze Triathlon, Richard's Bay, 05-03-2005
Bronze Triathlon, Meerhout, 29-05-2005
Silver Triathlon, Stein, 25-06-2005
Silver Triathlon, Aalsmeer, 28-08-2005
Silver Triathlon, Potchefstroom, 14-01-2006
Silver Triathlon, Pretoria, 05-03-2006
Gold Duathlon, Klerksdorp, 25-03-2006
Gold Duathlon, Pretoria, 09-04-2006
Gold Team Triathlon, Enschede, 07-05-2006
Silver Team Triathlon, Gladbeck, 21-05-2006
Bronze Triathlon, Stein, Dutch Championships, 01-07-2006
Gold Triathlon, Aalsmeer, 26-08-2006
Silver Triathlon, Clanwilliam, 30-09-2006
Silver Triathlon, Witbank, 08-10-2006
Silver Triathlon, Potchefstroom, 22-10-2006
Bronze Triathlon, Port Elizabeth, 05-11-2006
Silver Triathlon, Vanderbijlpark, 26-11-2006
Bronze Triathlon, Midmar Dam, 03-12-2006
Gold Triathlon, Potchefstroom, 13-02-2007
Silver Triathlon, Champs Langebaan, 03-03-2007
Gold Triathlon, Amsterdam, 10-06-2007
Gold Triathlon, Aalsmeer, 28-08-2007
Gold Triathlon, Germiston, 21-10-2007
Gold Triathlon, Midmar Dam, 28-10-2007
Gold Triathlon, Potchefstroom, 11-11-2007
Gold Triathlon, Roodeplaat Dam, 25-11-2007
Gold Triathlon, Vanderbijlpark, 02-12-2007
Gold Triathlon, Resolution Health-Energade Series, 10-12-2007
Silver Triathlon, Bloemfontein, 23-02-2008
Gold Triathlon, Stein, Dutch Championships, 21-06-2008
31e Olympic Triathlon Beijing, 19-08-2008
