= Bulwer Forest Complex =

- IUCN category IV (habitat/species management area)
- Interactive map of Bulwer Forest Complex
- Location: Ingwe Local Municipality, Harry Gwala District Municipality
- Nearest city: Pietermaritzburg
- Coordinates: 29°48′S 29°46′E
- Area: ~1,100 ha (cumulative)
- Established: 1958 (original proclamations)
- Governing body: Ezemvelo KZN Wildlife

The Bulwer Forest Complex is a protected area cluster comprising five distinct nature reserves and associated municipal lands situated in the KwaZulu-Natal Midlands, South Africa. Located surrounding the town of Bulwer in the Dr nkosazane Dlamini Zuma, the complex protects significant remnants of Southern Mistbelt Forest, a threatened vegetation type endemic to the region.

The complex is designated as an Important Bird Area (IBA) and is recognised as a critical breeding site for the endangered Cape parrot (Poicephalus robustus). In 2025, the complex gained scientific attention as the type locality for the newly described Boston rain frog (Breviceps batrachophiliorum).

== Geography and climate ==
The complex lies in the foothills of the Southern Drakensberg, with altitudes ranging from approximately 1,300 metres (4,300 ft) to over 2,000 metres (6,600 ft) above sea level. The forests occupy the cool, south and southeast-facing slopes of the Bulwer Mountain (locally known as AmaHaqa or Marwaqa), which protects the vegetation from the desiccating effects of the sun and fire-prone grasslands.

The region experiences a summer rainfall pattern, with a mean annual precipitation of approximately 1,062 millimetres (41.8 in). This is significantly supplemented by orographic fog ("mist"), which provides essential occult precipitation, maintaining the high humidity required for epiphytic flora.

== Constituent reserves ==
The Bulwer Forest Complex is not a contiguous block but a fragmented network of five provincial nature reserves and municipal erven:

Marutswa Nature Reserve (approx. 268 ha): Located adjacent to Bulwer town. It features the Marutswa Forest Boardwalk and an education centre funded by the Sappi–WWF TreeRoutes Partnership.

Marwaqa Nature Reserve (approx. 365 ha): Protects the upper slopes and basalt cliffs of Bulwer Mountain. It is a popular site for paragliding and hang gliding.

Ingelabantwana Nature Reserve (approx. 338–342 ha): The largest and most remote forest patch, serving as a core refuge for shy mammal species.

Indhloveni Nature Reserve (approx. 30 ha): A smaller "stepping stone" forest patch facilitating species movement.

Xotsheyake Nature Reserve (approx. 98 ha): Managed for water catchment and invasive species control.

Additionally, Municipal Erf 179 (approx. 150 ha), Erf 180, and Erf 181 are managed as part of the conservation footprint.

== Flora ==
The forests are classified as Southern Mistbelt Forests (FOz 3). The canopy is dominated by Afrocarpus falcatus (Outeniqua yellowwood), Podocarpus latifolius (real yellowwood), and Ocotea bullata (black stinkwood).

Distinctive mid-canopy and understory species include:

- Xymalos monospora (lemonwood)
- Zanthoxylum davyi (knobwood)
- Kiggelaria africana (wild peach)
- Scadoxus puniceus (paintbrush lily)

The fungal diversity is also high, with recent surveys discovering potential new lineages of the genus Orbilia in Marutswa Forest.

== Fauna ==
=== Avifauna ===
The complex is a stronghold for the Cape parrot (Poicephalus robustus). Flocks of up to 100 individuals have been recorded in Marutswa, feeding on yellowwood kernels. Other forest specialists include the orange ground thrush (Geokichla gurneyi), bush blackcap (Lioptilus nigricapillus), and Narina trogon (Apaloderma narina).

=== Herpetofauna ===
The moist leaf litter and mistbelt climate support a rich diversity of amphibians.

Boston rain frog (Breviceps batrachophiliorum): Described in 2025, this species is endemic to the KwaZulu-Natal Midlands. The type specimen was collected near Boston, but significant populations have been identified in the Marwaqa and Clairmont reserves. It is distinguished by its rapid, short call compared to the related Breviceps verrucosus.

Bush squeaker (Arthroleptis wahlbergii): A common terrestrial breeder in the forest floor.

KwaZulu dwarf chameleon (Bradypodion melanocephalum): Found in the forest margins and associated shrubland.

=== Mammals ===
Mammals present include the bushbuck (Tragelaphus scriptus), bushpig (Potamochoerus larvatus), Sykes's monkey (Cercopithecus albogularis), and the southern tree hyrax (Dendrohyrax arboreus).

== History ==
=== Colonial logging ===
During the late 19th century, the forests were heavily exploited for timber to support the developing colony of Natal. Historical sawpits are still visible along the hiking trails in Marutswa Nature Reserve. The logging focused on large Afrocarpus falcatus and Ocotea bullata for railway sleepers and construction.

=== Conservation ===
Conservation efforts began with the appointment of the Forest Commission in 1878, which highlighted the destruction of Crown Forests. The reserves were formally proclaimed in the mid-20th century, with significant consolidations occurring via Proclamation 72 of 1958.

In recent years, the Bulwer Biosphere initiative and the Marutswa Forest Boardwalk (opened in 2008) have shifted the focus toward eco-tourism and community-based conservation.
