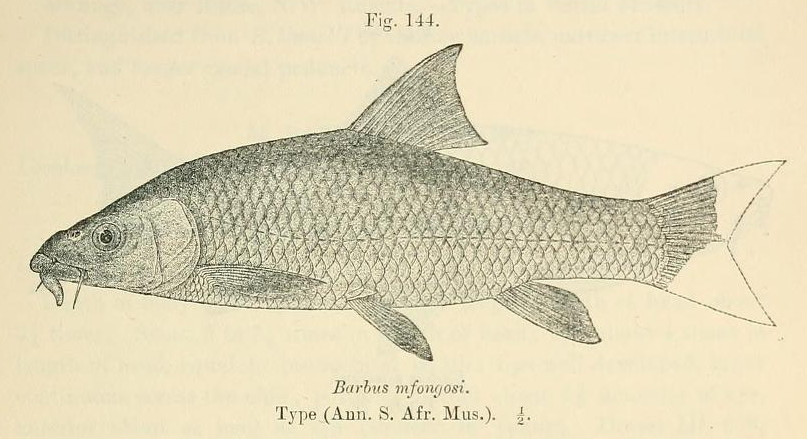

Conservation status
- Least Concern (IUCN 3.1)

Scientific classification
- Kingdom: Animalia
- Phylum: Chordata
- Class: Actinopterygii
- Order: Cypriniformes
- Family: Cyprinidae
- Subfamily: Torinae
- Genus: Labeobarbus
- Species: L. natalensis

Binomial name
- Labeobarbus natalensis (Castelnau, 1861)

Synonyms
- Barbus natalensis Castelnau, 1861; Labeobarbus aureus Cope, 1867; Barbus aureus (Cope, 1867); Barbus bowkeri Boulenger, 1902; Barbus lobochilus Boulenger, 1911; Barbus mfongosi John Gilchrist (zoologist)Gilchrist & Thompson, 1913; Barbus robinsoni Gilchrist & Thompson, 1913; Barbus zuluensis Gilchrist & Thompson, 1913; Barbus dendrotrachelus Fowler, 1934; Barbus grouti Fowler, 1934; Barbus stigmaticus Fowler, 1934; Barbus tugelensis Fowler, 1934; Barbus marleyi Fowler, 1934

= Scaly yellowfish =

Species of fish

The scaly yellowfish, or KwaZulu-Natal yellowfish, (Labeobarbus natalensis) is a species of freshwater fish in the family Cyprinidae.

This fish is found in the Tugela River System in South Africa, as well as in the Umzimkulu, Umfolozi and the Mgeni. It is one of the most common fishes in KwaZulu-Natal Province and it lives in different habitats between the Drakensberg foothills and the coastal lowlands. The species has been categorized as least concern (LC) on the IUCN Red List.
