= Umfolozi River =

River in KwaZulu-Natal, South Africa

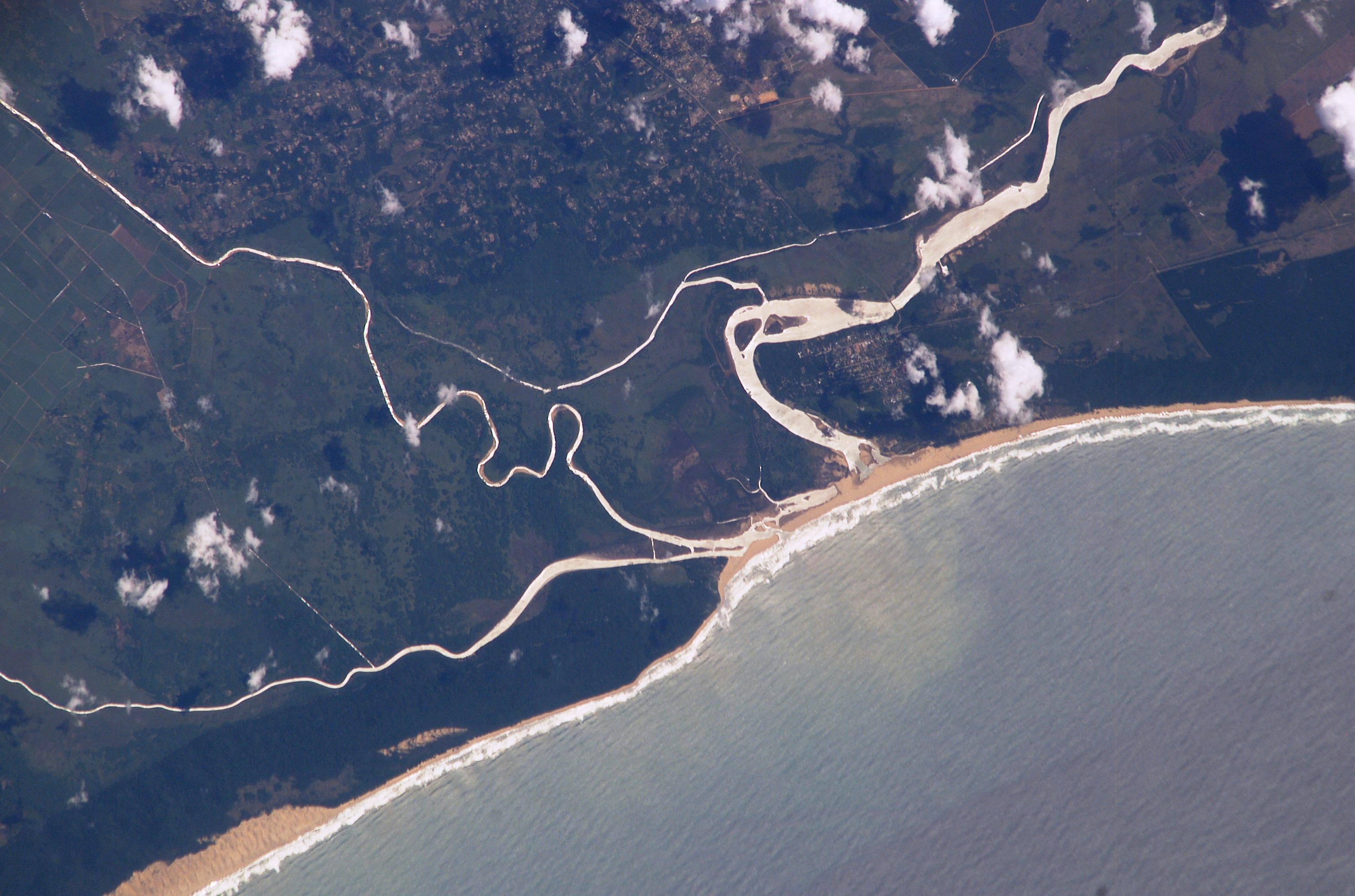
- Satellite image of the Umfolozi and Hluhluwe River rivers converging at the St. Lucia estuary in the iSimangaliso Wetland Park, in northern KwaZulu-Natal

- Location of the Umfolozi River mouth
- Native name: imFolozi (Zulu)

Location
- Country: South Africa
- Province: KwaZulu-Natal

Physical characteristics
- Mouth
  - location: KwaZulu-Natal, South Africa
  - coordinates: 28°23′32″S 32°25′27″E

The Umfolozi River (also uMfolozi, Imfolozi or Mfolozi) is a river in KwaZulu-Natal, a province of South Africa. It is formed by the confluence of the Black (Imfolozi emnyama) and White Umfolozi (Imfolozi emhlope) Rivers near the southeastern boundary of the Hluhluwe-Umfolozi Game Reserve. The isiZulu name imFolozi is generally considered to describe the zigzag course followed by both tributaries, though other explanations have been given.

The river flows in an easterly direction to the Indian Ocean at Maphelana, a coastal resort just south of the St Lucia River mouth. It originally meandered over the Monzi Flats, where it split into numerous slow-flowing channels before entering the St. Lucia Estuary at Honeymoon Bend. The slow-moving water and reed beds in channels operated as a natural filtering system that removed silt from the Umfolozi floodwaters and created a rich habitat for numerous species.

== Ecology ==
During the 1950s, the Umfolozi Landowners Association contained and artificially channelled the river through the Monzi Flats to develop sugarcane farms. The new Umfolozi canal resulted in the unfiltered water depositing its silt load after entering the slower moving St. Lucia Estuary. This caused the estuary mouth to rapidly silt up. There had only been one record of this occurring until that time, during the sustained drought during the 1930s.

At 28°20′58″S 31°58′46″E the Black Umfolozi River and the White Umfolozi River, join to form the Umfolozi.

=== Characteristics ===
It is a meandering river, with a catchment area of 11,068 km^{3}. It is 38 metres wide near its mouth, with a slope gradient of 0.36 m/km. The average diameter of the bed material is 0.35 mm (sand).

=== Sediment problems ===
The river transports carries annually 1.4 million tonnes of suspended sediment to the ocean. The government started a costly dredging operation in the estuary mouth area, but it proved ineffective. After years of dredging, the next plan was to prevent the Umfolozi River from entering the St Lucia estuary. The Umfolozi River was canalised straight out to sea at Maphelana. The impact of this decision continues; the silt plume from the river is often blown by strong south winds as far north as Sodwana Bay, 100 km away. The changes threaten the coral reefs, which provide fish habitat and protect the shore. In addition, it jeopardises the associated good snorkelling available at Cape Vidal, part of iSimangaliso Wetland Park, a UNESCO World Heritage Site.

=== Fish ===
The scaly yellowfish (Labeobarbus natalensis) is a fish found in the Umfolozi River System as well as in the Umzimkulu, Umkomazi, Tugela and the Mgeni. It is a common endemic species in KwaZulu-Natal Province and it lives in different habitats between the Drakensberg foothills and the coastal lowlands.

== Aerial photos ==
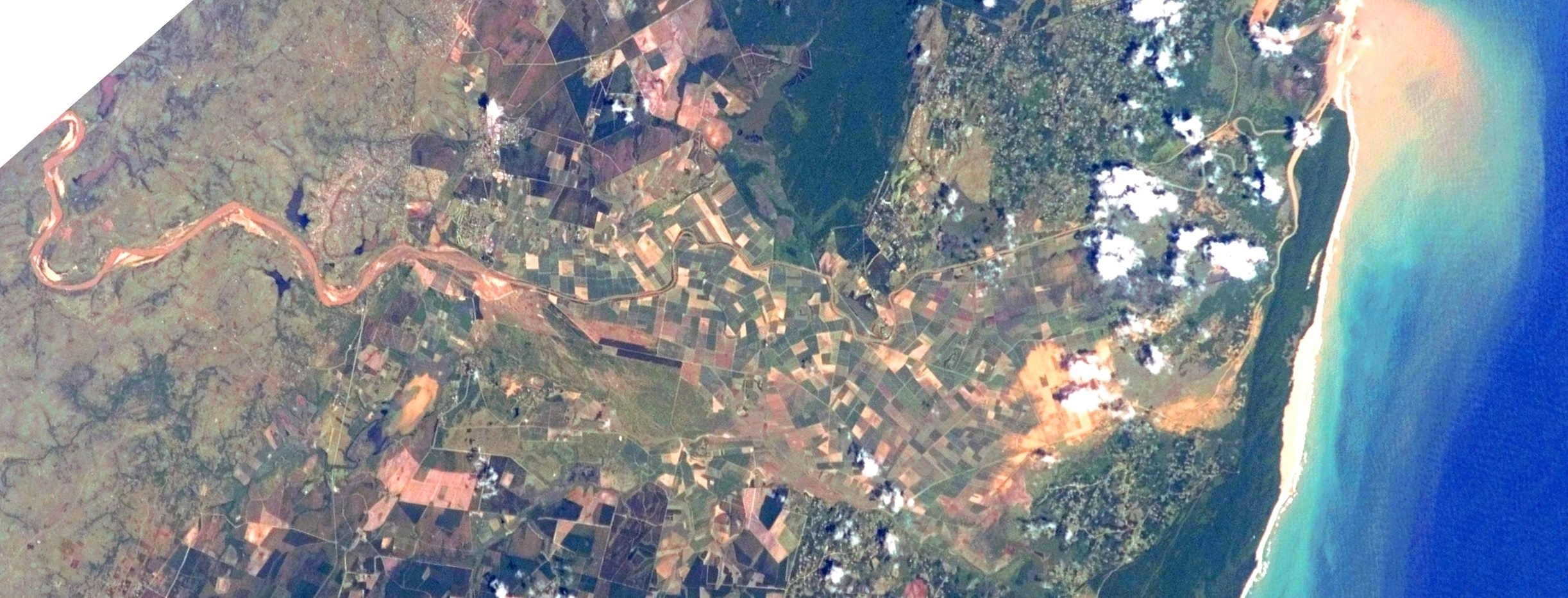
The lower Umfolozi converging on St. Lucia town (top right)

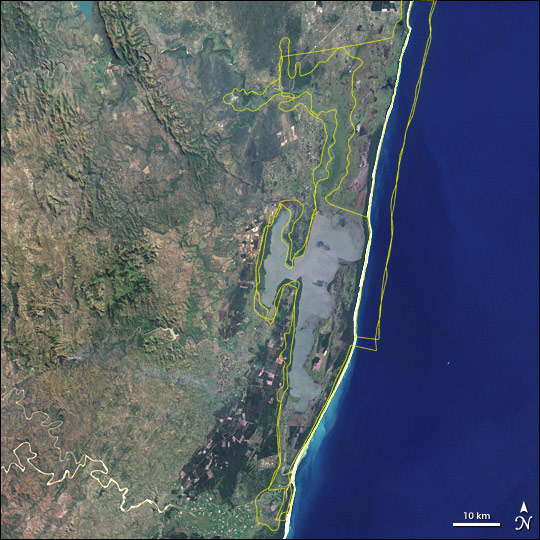
The Mfolozi Rivers are seen converging on the iSimangaliso Wetland Park

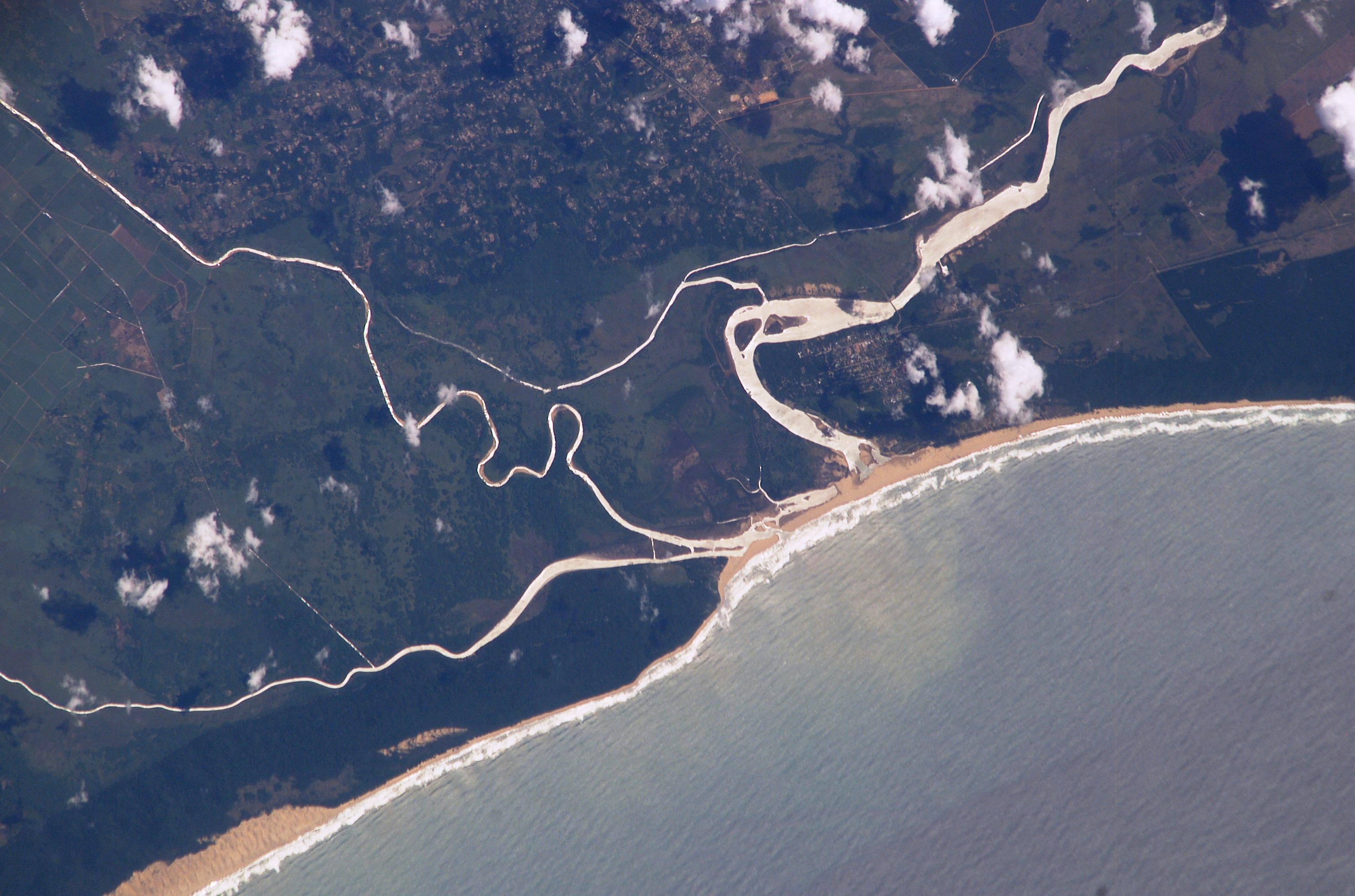
The old and new courses near the mouth, with the Msunduzi converging from the left (i.e. south), enclosing a wetland. Also note the silt plume at sea.

== See also ==
- List of rivers of South Africa
- List of estuaries of South Africa
- List of dams in South Africa
- List of drainage basins of South Africa
- Water Management Areas
