= Black Umfolozi River =

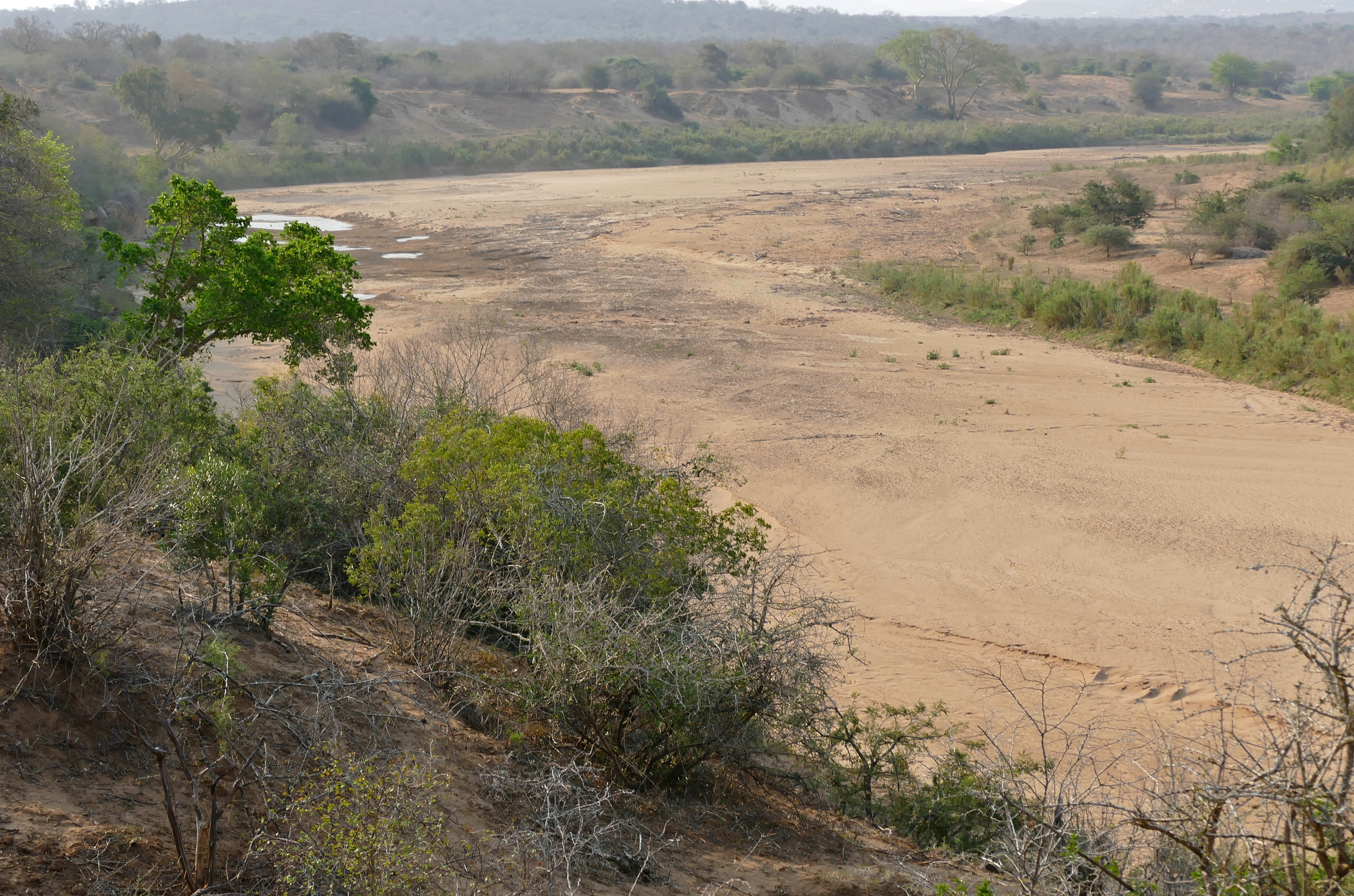
- The almost dry riverbed in 2016

- Location of the Black Umfolozi River mouth (and confluence with the White Umfolozi)
- Native name: Imfolozi emnyama (Zulu)

Location
- Country: South Africa
- Province: KwaZulu-Natal

Physical characteristics
- Source: Kwa Mnyathi, Vryheid
- Mouth
  - location: KwaZulu-Natal, South Africa
  - coordinates: 28°20′58″S 31°58′51″E

The Black Umfolozi River (Zulu: Imfolozi emnyama) is one of the two main tributaries to the Umfolozi River in KwaZulu Natal, South Africa. It forms part of the Upper Umfolozi (Zulu: Enhla neMfolozi) – the Lower Umfolozi being the area downstream of its confluence with the White Umfolozi. It main source is in KwaMnyathi area in Vryheid and flows through most areas in Zululand till it confluence with White Umfolozi near Hlabisa

== Etymology ==
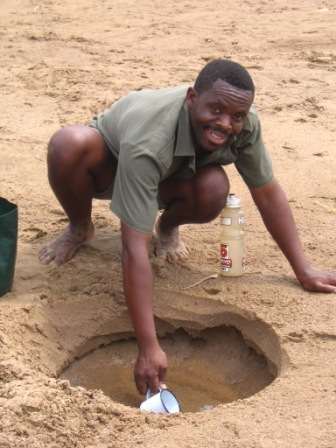
Collecting water from the sand

The river is called "black" because of the dark (black) stones which are found along its course. Imfolozi means "zig-zag", which reflects the pattern the river follows along its course.

== Course ==
It flows through Swart-Mfolozi, Ceza, Nongoma and eventually has a confluence with the White Umfolozi near the southeastern boundary of Hluhluwe-Umfolozi Game Reserve to form the Umfolozi River. The Thangami Safari Spa is also situated on its banks. Empangeni and Mtubatuba are two major areas related to the Lower Umfolozi region.

== History ==
Zwide, chief of king of the very powerful Ndwandwe tribe had his own domain north and east of the Black Umfolozi River.

== Gallery ==
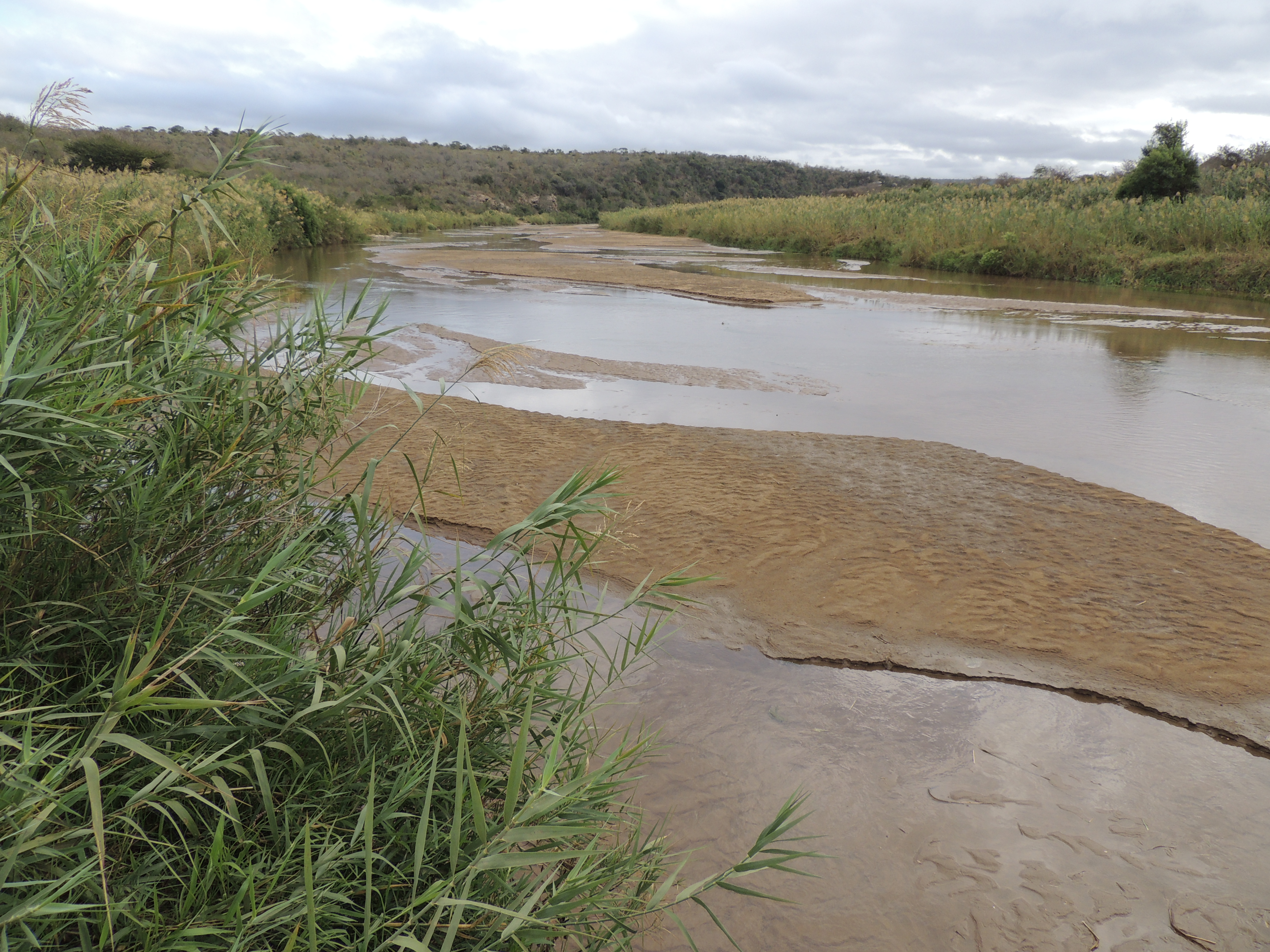
Flowing, flanked by giant and common reed

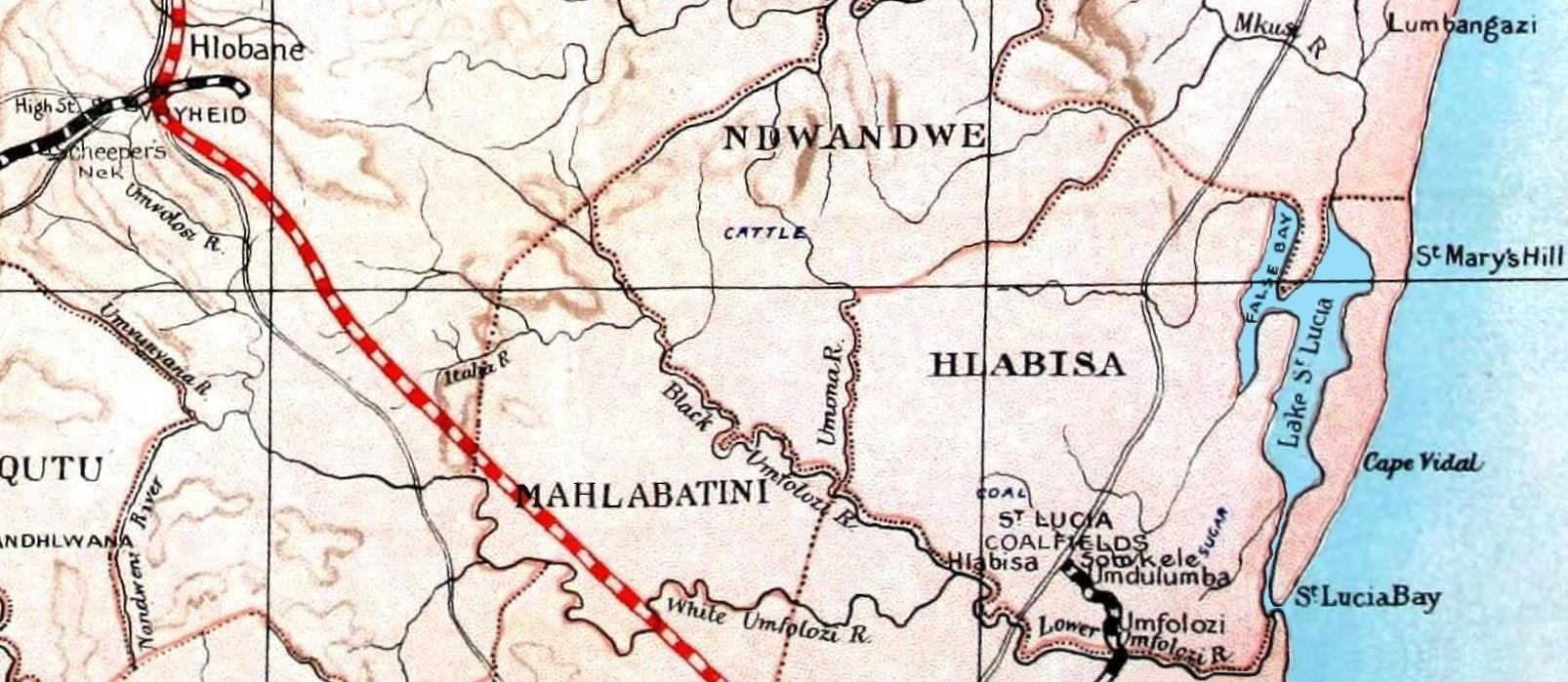
A map of the river and its tributaries (1911)
