= Mount Currie Nature Reserve =

Nature reserve in KwaZulu-Natal, South Africa

- IUCN category IV (habitat/species management area)
- Interactive map of Mount Currie Nature Reserve
- Location: Kokstad, KwaZulu-Natal, South Africa
- Nearest city: Kokstad
- Coordinates: 30°28′45″S 29°25′10″E
- Area: 1,777 ha (4,390 acres)
- Established: 1980
- Governing body: Ezemvelo KZN Wildlife

Mount Currie Nature Reserve is a 1,777-hectare (4,390-acre) nature reserve situated approximately 5 km (3.1 mi) north of Kokstad in the East Griqualand region of KwaZulu-Natal, South Africa. Managed by Ezemvelo KZN Wildlife, the reserve preserves a rugged mountainous landscape, high-altitude wetlands, and significant historical sites related to the Griqua people.

== Geography ==
The reserve is dominated by the Mount Currie peak, which rises to 2,224 m (7,297 ft) above sea level. The terrain consists of steep dolerite cliffs, sandstone outcrops, and a large central vlei (wetland) system that feeds the Crystal Spring, the primary water source for the town of Kokstad.

== History ==
Mount Currie holds deep historical significance for the Griqua people, a community of mixed-race descent who migrated to the area under the leadership of Adam Kok III in the 1860s.

=== The Griqua Settlement ===
Before the town of Kokstad was established on its current site, the Griquas settled at the foot of Mount Currie (then known as "Mount Currie Laager"). The reserve contains several historical landmarks from this period:

- Adam Kok III's Grave: The burial site of the Griqua leader is located near the reserve entrance and is a declared National Heritage Site.
- Historical Cemetery: A small cemetery containing the graves of early Griqua pioneers.
- Laager Site: The remains of the original stone fortifications used by the Griquas for protection during their early years in the region.

== Biodiversity ==
The reserve is an ecological crossroads where Drakensberg montane flora meets East Griqualand grassland.

=== Flora ===
The vegetation is primarily Drakensberg Foothill Moist Grassland. In the sheltered kloofs (ravines), small patches of indigenous forest occur, featuring Leucosidea (Ouhout) and Yellowwood trees. The reserve is also known for a high diversity of ground orchids and proteas.

=== Fauna ===
- Mammals: Common species include Eland, Common reedbuck, Mountain reedbuck, Blesbok, Grey rhebok, and Springbok (which were introduced to the reserve).
- Avifauna: Over 240 bird species have been recorded. It is a reliable site for high-altitude specialists such as the Gurney's sugarbird, Bearded vulture, Cape vulture, and the endangered Wattled crane, which utilizes the reserve's wetlands.

== Tourism ==
Mount Currie is a popular destination for hikers and history enthusiasts:

- Hiking: A strenuous trail leads to the summit of Mount Currie, offering views into Lesotho and towards the southern Drakensberg peaks.
- Water Sports: The Crystal Spring Dam is used for non-motorized boating and angling.
- Camping: There is a well-maintained campsite with 10 stands and ablution facilities near the dam.
