= Midmar Mile =

Swimming event in South Africa

The Midmar Mile is a swimming race held annually in February at the Midmar Dam north of Pietermaritzburg, South Africa. Each year, it draws thousands of competitors, from serious international athletes and Olympic medallists to purely recreational swimmers. The inaugural Midmar Mile was held in 1974.

In 2009 the event, in which 13 755 competitors finished the race, was recognised by the Guinness Book of World Records as the world's largest open water swimming event.

The event gains its name from the location (Midmar Dam) and the distance (roughly one mile (1.6 km)). A unique feature of the race is that while the distance covered is always a mile, depending on rainfall and the water levels in the dam, the distance swum varies from year to year. In years with poor rainfall, competitors are subject to the infamous Midmar sprint start: a bedlam of bodies sprinting across the muddy lake-shore and through the shallows until the water is deep enough to swim.

In order to handle the vast number of competitors, the swimmers swim out in 5 groups at three-minute intervals in 8 separate mile races over two days; the group division the swimmer is assigned to is based on a qualifying time in a previous (qualifying) event, with the fastest group leaving first.

== See also ==
- Midmar Dam
- Sport in South Africa
- List of swimming competitions
