= Long-toed tree frog =

Conservation status
- Endangered (IUCN 3.1)

Scientific classification
- Kingdom: Animalia
- Phylum: Chordata
- Class: Amphibia
- Order: Anura
- Family: Arthroleptidae
- Genus: Leptopelis
- Species: L. xenodactylus

Binomial name
- Leptopelis xenodactylus Poynton, 1963

Species of amphibian

The long-toed tree frog (Leptopelis xenodactylus) is a species of frog in the family Arthroleptidae found in South Africa and possibly Lesotho. Its natural habitats are temperate grassland, swamps, freshwater marshes, and intermittent freshwater marshes.

This species generally uses semipermanent water, and its eggs are presumably laid in a nest on the ground near water. As the name implies, these frogs are often seen in trees or other high-growing vegetation.

It is threatened by habitat loss.
