= White Umfolozi River =

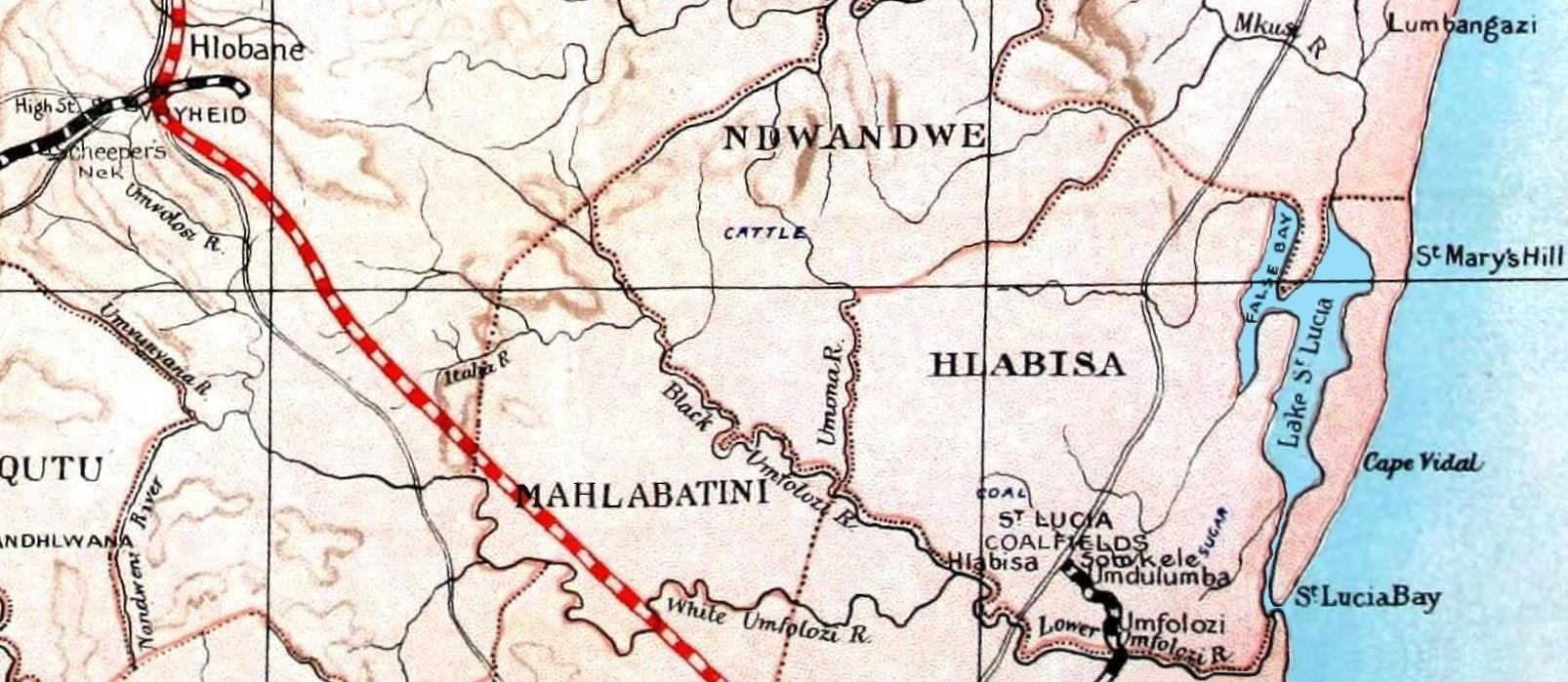
- A map of the river and its tributaries (1911)

- Location within South Africa
- Native name: Imfolozi emhlope (Zulu)

Location
- Country: South Africa
- Province: KwaZulu-Natal

Physical characteristics
- Mouth
  - location: KwaZulu-Natal, South Africa
  - coordinates: 28°20′58″S 31°58′51″E

Basin features
- Tributaries
  - left: Nhlungwane River
  - right: Mkumbane River; Mpembeni River

The White Umfolozi River originates just west of Vryheid, KwaZulu-Natal, South Africa and has a confluence with the Black Umfolozi River at 28°20′58″S 31°58′46″E to form the Umfolozi River, which flows eastward towards the Indian Ocean.

== See also ==
- List of rivers of South Africa
- List of dams in South Africa
- List of drainage basins of South Africa
- Water Management Areas
