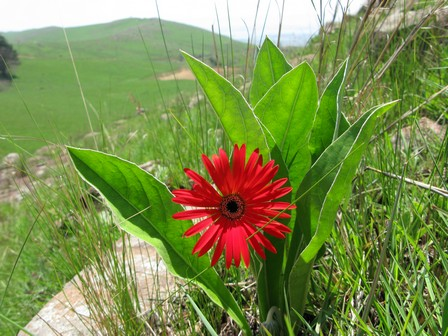

Scientific classification
- Kingdom: Plantae
- Clade: Embryophytes
- Clade: Tracheophytes
- Clade: Angiosperms
- Clade: Eudicots
- Clade: Asterids
- Order: Asterales
- Family: Asteraceae
- Genus: Gerbera
- Species: G. aurantiaca

Binomial name
- Gerbera aurantiaca Sch.Bip.

= Gerbera aurantiaca =

Species of flowering plant

Gerbera aurantiaca, the Hilton daisy, is a long-lived KwaZulu-Natal mistbelt grassland endemic with red flowers.

== Description ==
The Hilton daisy is a relative of the common Barberton daisy. While the typical colour of the Hilton daisies is red, the flowers range from yellow through orange to bright red and deep scarlet. The Hilton daisy is an endangered species and only 15 viable populations of the species are known to exist.

== History ==
The Hilton daisy was first discovered by Christian Ferdinand Krauss during his visit to Natal in 1839. They were first described by botanist Schulz Bipontinus in 1844 and named for the brilliant orange colour of the specimen sent over to Europe. The Hilton daisy is named after Hilton College and the nearby village of Hilton, and has an emotive association with both the college and the village.
