= Nagle Dam =

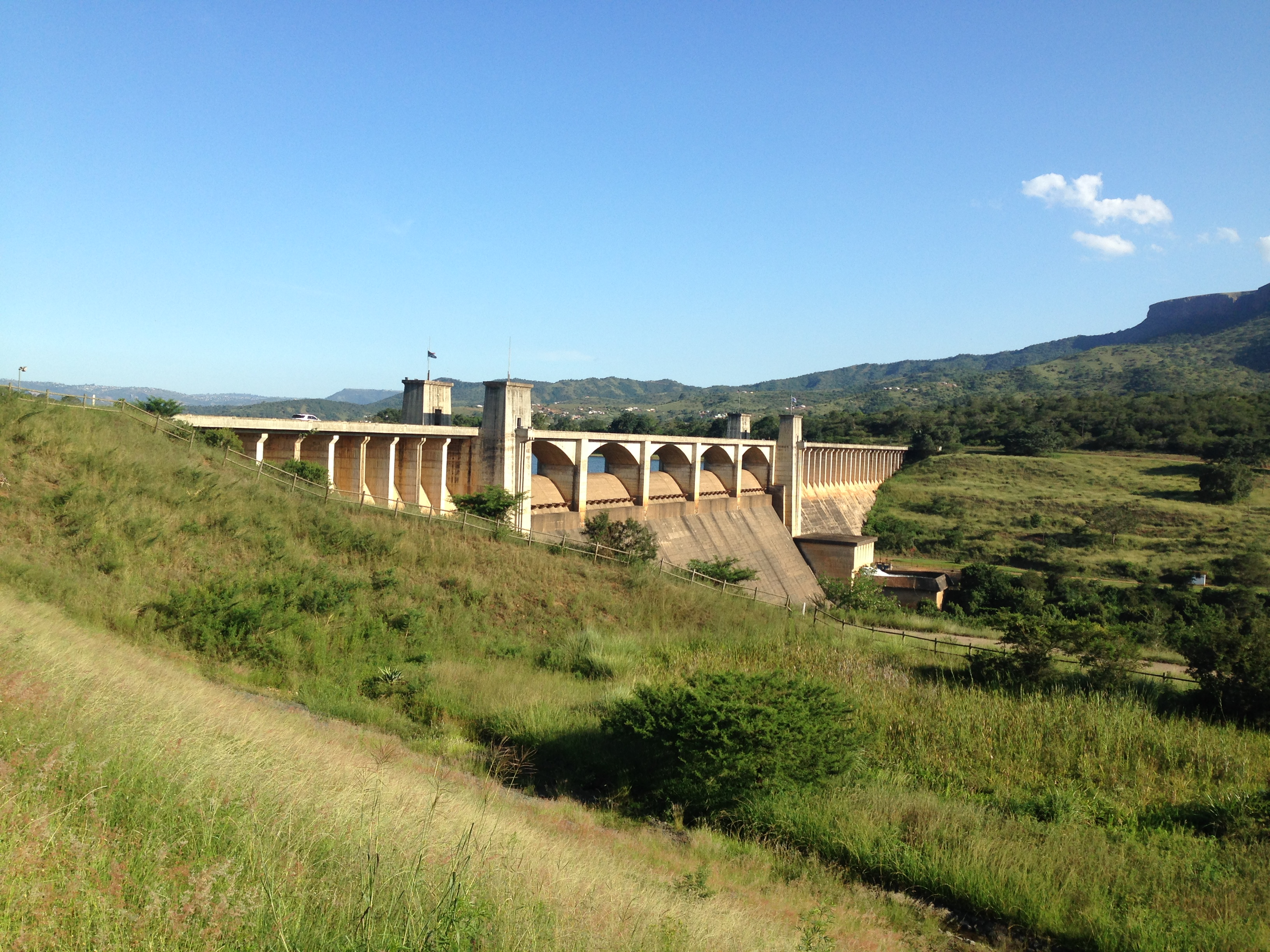
- Nagle Dam wall
- Interactive map of Nagle Dam
- Official name: Nagle Dam
- Location: KwaZulu-Natal, South Africa
- Coordinates: 29°35′40″S 30°38′30″E
- Opening date: 1950
- Operators: Department of Water Affairs and Forestry

Dam and spillways
- Type of dam: Mass Concrete
- Impounds: Mgeni River
- Height: 44.3 metres (145 ft)
- Length: 393 metres (1,289 ft)

Reservoir
- Creates: Nagle Dam Reservoir
- Total capacity: 39,300,000 cubic metres (1.39×10^{9} cu ft)
- Catchment area: 2545 km^{2}
- Surface area: 156.13 hectares (385.8 acres)

Nagle Dam is a mass concrete type dam located on the Mgeni River, near Cato Ridge, KwaZulu-Natal, South Africa. It was established in 1950 and serves mainly for municipal and industrial purposes. The hazard potential of the dam has been ranked high (3).

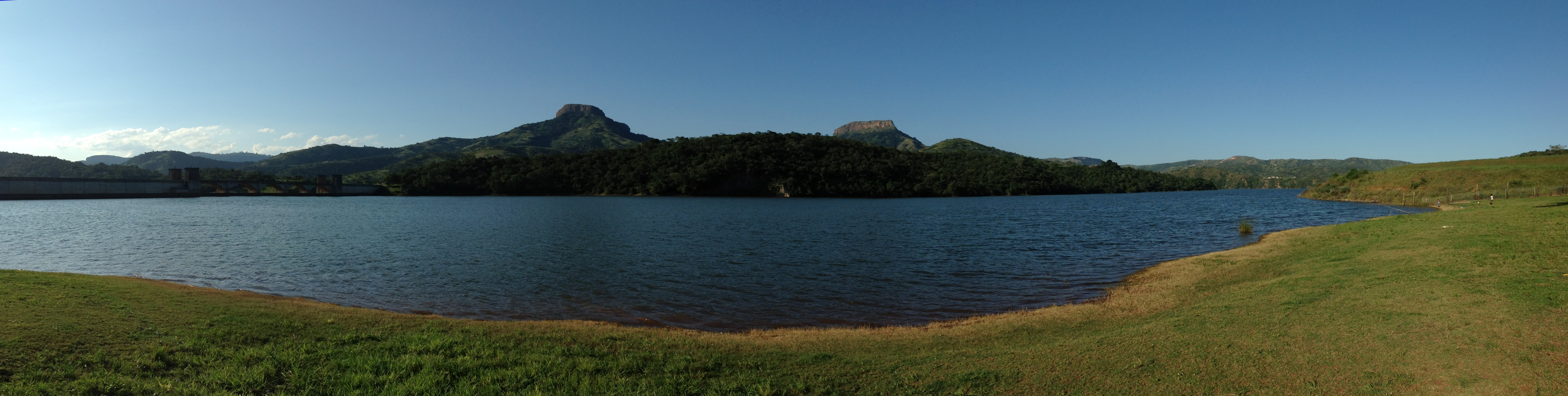
A panorama of Nagle Dam showing the dam wall on the left.

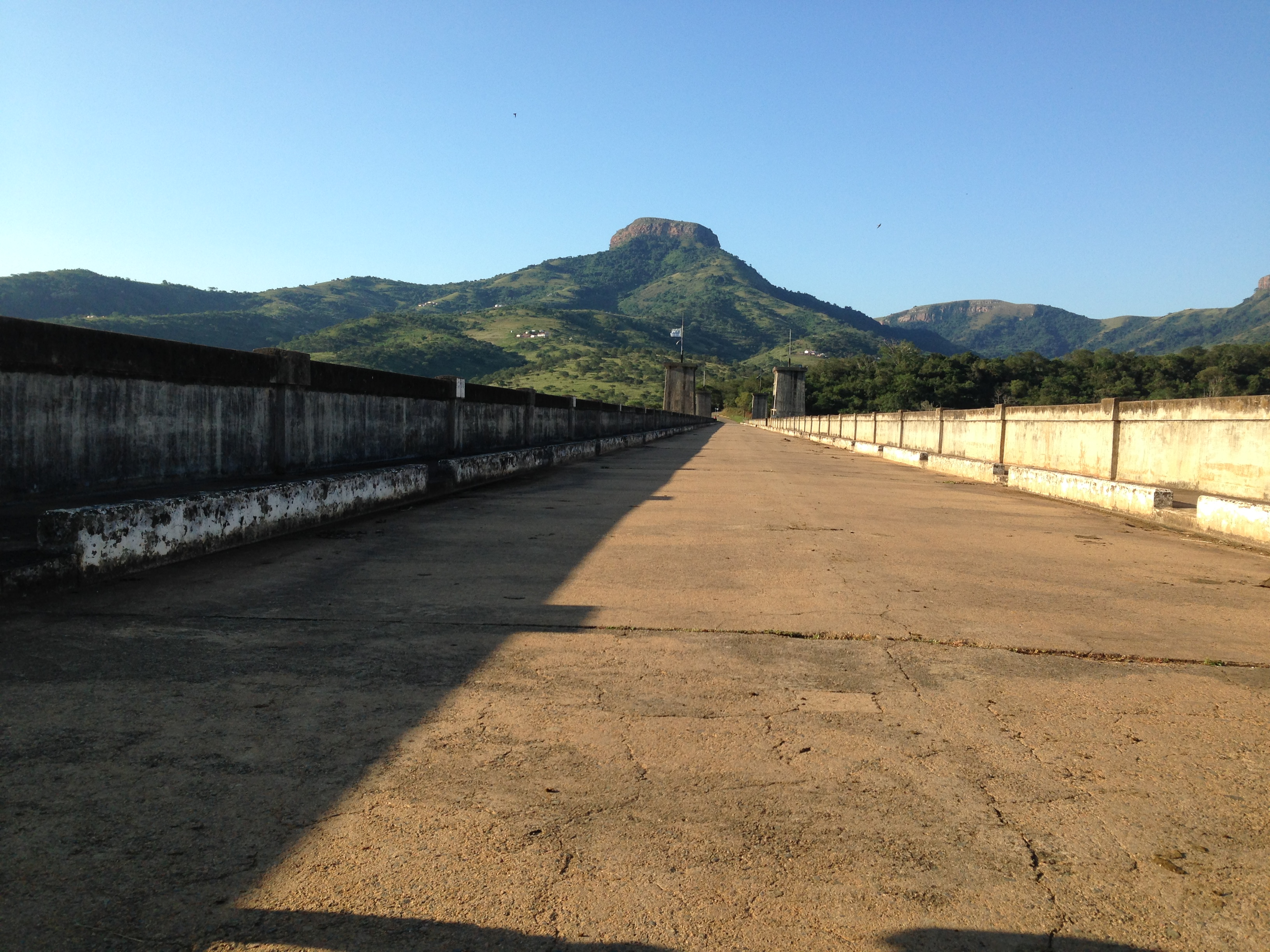
The two-lane road over the dam wall.

== See also ==
- List of reservoirs and dams in South Africa
- List of rivers of South Africa
