= Bushbuck =

Bushbuck is a common name that may refer to one of the following African antelopes:

- Cape bushbuck (Tragelaphus sylvaticus or Tragelaphus scriptus sylvaticus)
- Harnessed bushbuck or northern bushbuck (Tragelaphus scriptus)
