= Inanda Dam =

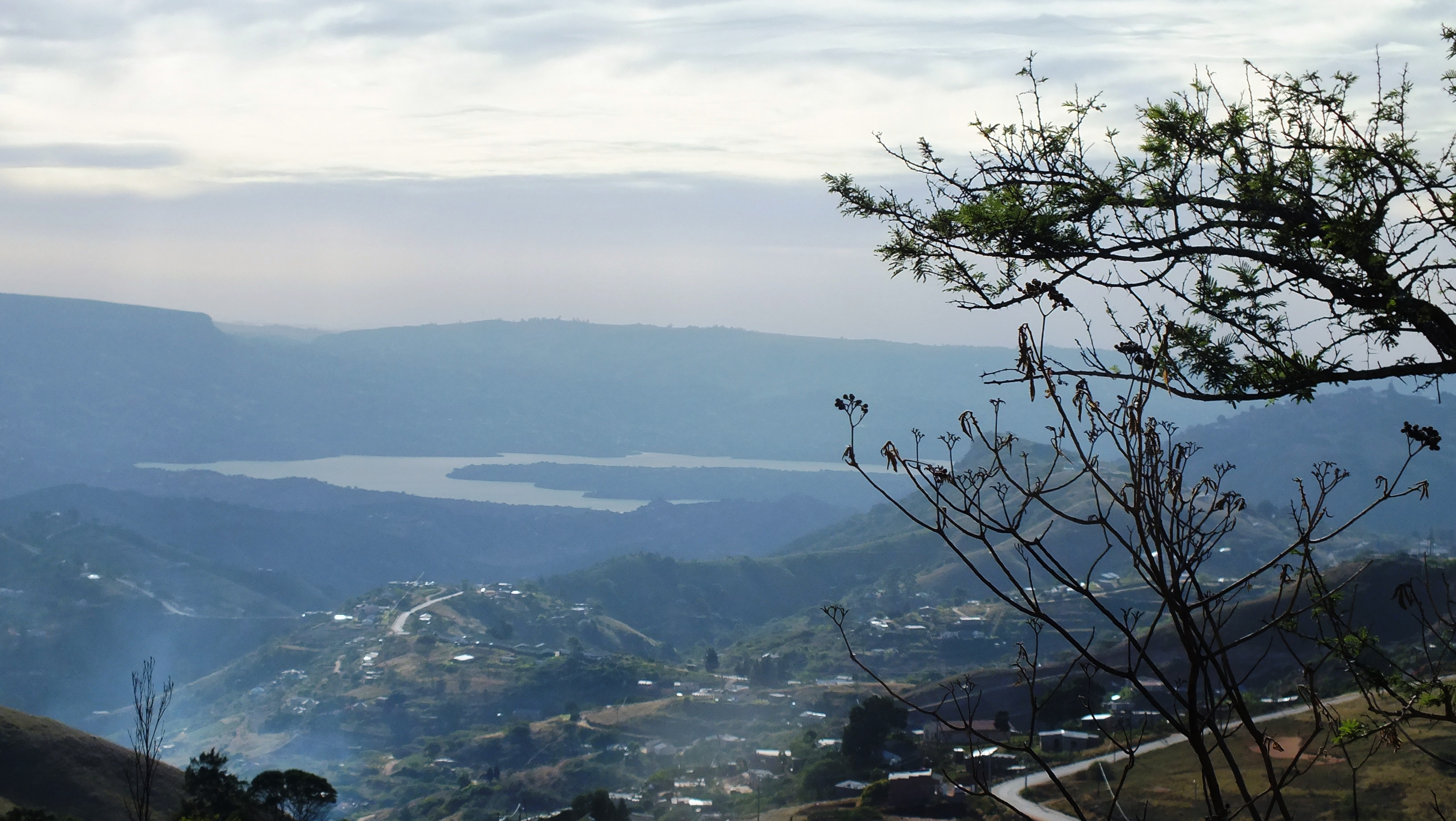
- Interactive map of Inanda Dam
- Official name: Inanda Dam
- Country: South Africa
- Location: Inanda, KwaZulu-Natal
- Coordinates: 29°42′1″S 30°52′1″E
- Purpose: Industrial and domestic
- Opening date: 1989
- Owner: Department of Water Affairs

Dam and spillways
- Type of dam: Earth fill dam
- Impounds: Umgeni River
- Height: 65 m
- Length: 595 m

Reservoir
- Creates: Inanda Dam Reservoir
- Total capacity: 241 700 000 m³
- Surface area: 1 463 ha

Inanda Dam is an earth-fill type dam located on the Umgeni River, near Inanda, KwaZulu-Natal, South Africa. It was established in 1989 and its primary purpose is to serve for domestic and industrial use.

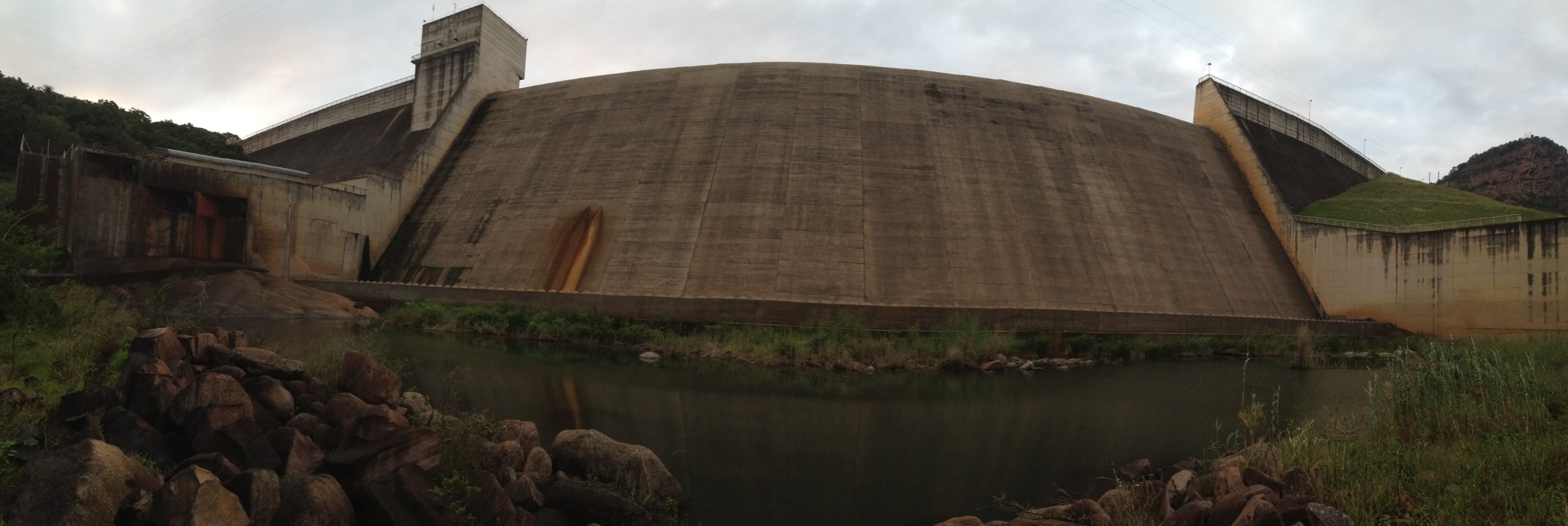
Inanda Dam Wall

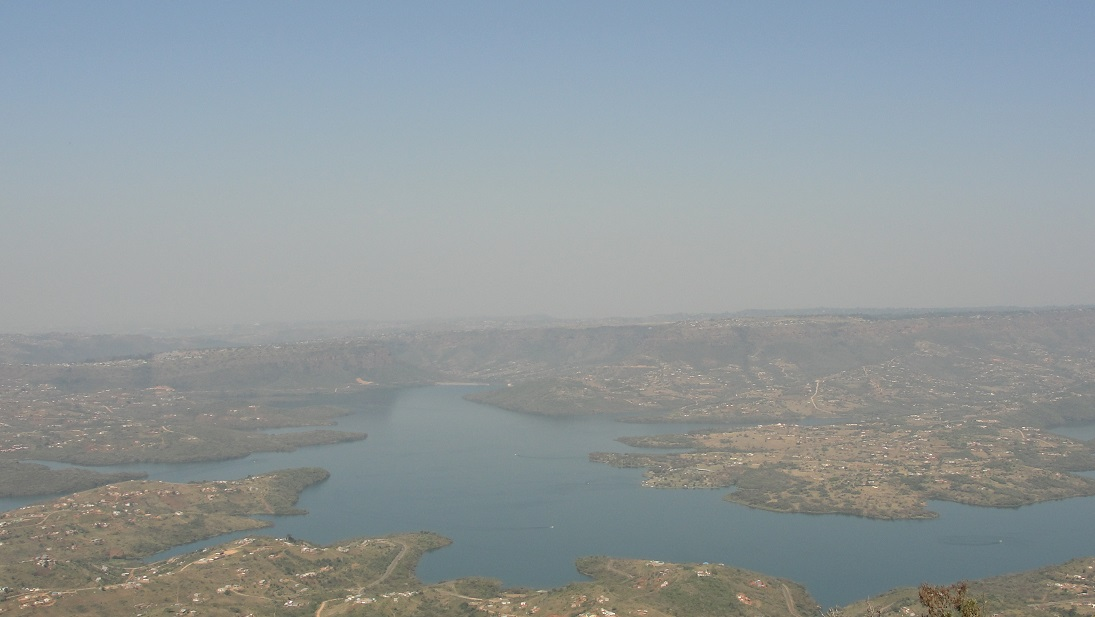
Inanda Dam

== See also ==
- List of reservoirs and dams in South Africa
- List of rivers of South Africa
