= Albert Falls Dam =

- Location within KwaZulu-Natal
- Interactive map of Albert Falls Dam
- Official name: Albert Falls Dam
- Country: South Africa
- Location: Near Pietermaritzburg, KwaZulu-Natal
- Coordinates: 29°26′10″S 30°23′18″E
- Purpose: Irrigation and domestic
- Opening date: 1976
- Owner: Department of Water Affairs

Dam and spillways
- Type of dam: Earth fill dam
- Impounds: Umgeni River
- Height: 33 metres (108 ft)
- Length: 2,006 metres (6,581 ft)

Reservoir
- Creates: Albert Falls Dam Reservoir
- Total capacity: 290.1 million cubic metres (10.24×10^{9} cu ft)
- Surface area: 2,350 hectares (5,800 acres)

Albert Falls Dam is a dam in the Umgeni River, just outside Pietermaritzburg, KwaZulu-Natal, South Africa. Established in 1976, the dam has a gross capacity of 290.1 million cubic meters and a surface area of 23.521 square kilometres (9.082 sq mi). The dam wall is 33 metres (108 ft) high.

A lake-wide bloom of the dinoflagellate Ceratium hirundinella, discovered in Albert Falls Dam in October 2006, exposed a significant ecological change indicative of reduced water quality in this historically mesotrophic reservoir. The spatial distribution of the bloom was examined synoptically in October 2006 and in January 2007.

== See also ==
- List of reservoirs and dams in South Africa
- List of rivers in South Africa
