= Operation Rhino =

Military operation by the US Army in Afghanistan

- Part of the War in Afghanistan (2001–2021)
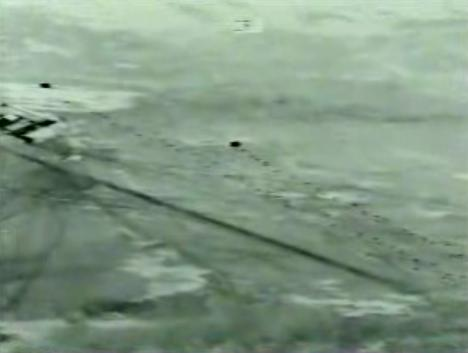
- Ranger parachute drop on objective "Rhino."
Date	19–20 October 2001 (1 day)
Location	Kandahar, Afghanistan 30°29′12″N 64°31′32″E, 3480m ASL
Result	U.S. victory

Belligerents
United States	Islamic Emirate of Afghanistan; Taliban

Commanders and leaders
General Tommy Franks (Commander, USCENTCOM) Lieutenant General Dell Dailey (Commander, JSOC) Colonel Joseph Votel (Commander, 75th Ranger Regiment) Lieutenant Colonel Stefan Banach (Commander, 3rd Battalion, 75th Ranger Regiment)	Mullah Omar (not present)

Strength
200 Army Rangers Joint Medical Augmentation Unit team	Unknown

Casualties and losses
No casualties in the operation, 2 killed in a helicopter crash while on standby for CSAR.	11 killed

Operation Rhino was a Joint Special Operations Command raid by several special operations units, including the United States Army's 160th Special Operation Aviation Regiment and the 75th Ranger Regiment (Regimental Reconnaissance Company and 3rd Ranger Battalion), on several Taliban targets in and around Kandahar, Afghanistan during the invasion of Afghanistan. The mission was an airfield seizure in support of a Delta Force raid on the nearby home of Mullah Omar; though intelligence suggested that perhaps neither location was occupied. Ultimately though both locations turned out to be largely empty, the operations were successfully completed, and provided substantial propaganda footage for the U.S. throughout the early war; though at the cost of two Rangers supporting the operation killed in a helicopter crash nearby in Pakistan.

== Background ==
Though the Rangers had examined the possibility of seizing Objective Rhino the week after September 11, the initial proposal as a target came by Gen. Tommy Franks out of CENTCOM. Objective Rhino was a 6,400 foot paved runway installed in a dry lake bed, approximately 100 miles southwest of Kandahar, originally built for Sheikh Mohammed bin Zayed (then the military chief of staff for the United Arab Emirates) as a hunting camp. After the September 11th attacks, bin Zayed had suggested to Franks that the camp could be used as a staging facility to reduce the number of U.S. forces that would be needed to deploy to Pakistan. Franks wanted the Rangers to seize the airfield to use as a staging point to deploy a Marine task force in Southern Afghanistan; while JSOC's planners wanted to use the airstrip as a helicopter forward arming and refueling point (FARP) to use to conduct a raid on Objective Gecko, the home of Mullah Omar on the north side of Kandahar city.

According to Franks, the reasoning behind the seizure of Rhino was to demonstrate that the U.S. could conduct a surprise attack in the Taliban's "heartland" territory, at a time of its choosing, while forcing the Taliban to commit reserves in the south (which would prevent them from being used against the Northern Alliance). Pete Blaber, the former Delta Force operations officer during the Gecko and Rhino missions, claims that Dell Dailey, the commander of Joint Special Operations Command (JSOC) at the time "believed that if we raided empty targets in Afghanistan and filmed the raids for the world to see, we would have some kind of morale-breaking effect on the enemy."

== Plan ==
The plan for the assault on Objective Rhino changed significantly over the course of its development. Initially, Rhino was intended to be a "Ranger mission", with a company-plus of Rangers seizing the airstrip which JSOC would then use as a forward support base for a Delta Force assault on Objective Gecko. Rhino was initially planned to be seized 48-hours prior to the air assault on Gecko; however by October the plan had morphed into both raids occurring simultaneously. Rhino's assault force, composed of 3rd Ranger Battalion, was intended to land in three MH-47E Chinooks, supported by three other MH-47E's (CSAR, QRF, and refueling aircraft) with two MH-60 Direct Action Penetrators (DAP) providing fire support. However, due to a lack of helicopters to support both the Rhino and Gecko missions, and with Gecko being viewed as the primary target, the insertion plan for the Rangers at Rhino was changed to a parachute assault less than a week before the missions launched. The combined Ranger force would consist of a little more than two infantry companies, and included Lieutenant Colonel Stefan Banach (the 3rd Ranger Battalion commander) and Votel (the regimental commander) jumping in with the force. Banach would command the ground fight on the objective, while Votel would provide coordination with the operation's other moving pieces. Despite early intelligence indications that Objective Rhino was empty, fresh reconnaissance imagery revealed that the Taliban had installed a security force on site, though some planners disputed whether the imagery depicted a "security force" or merely "people."

Due to the complex timing of the mid-air refueling operations required to reach Objective Gecko, the MH-60 Blackhawks assigned to that mission would need to land and conduct one of their refueling operations at Objective Rhino. Additionally the shift from air assault to airborne insertion combined with the long distances, meant that the QRF was shifted back to Masirah, located three hours away.

== Operation ==
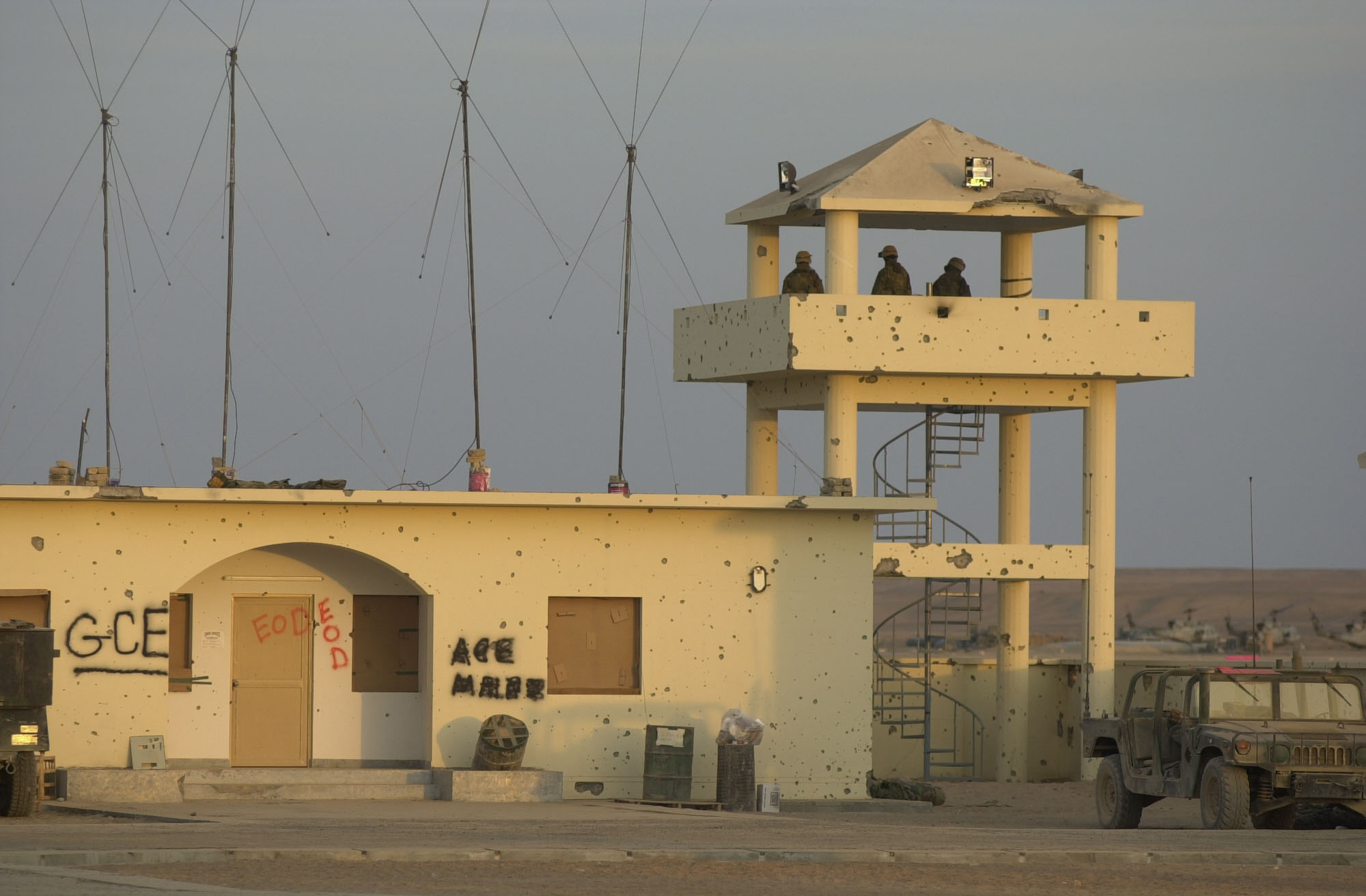
A guard tower at Camp Rhino on 2 December 2001.

In October 2001, a Ranger Reconnaissance team jumped into Afghanistan to recon the airfield. In a twist of irony, despite initial reports indicating no presence of enemy forces and expectations of an empty airfield, intelligence personnel suddenly expressed excessive concern at the mission's start. They cautioned the rangers to be prepared for potential Taliban forces equipped with advanced night vision goggles and warned about Taliban air defenses, mines on the objective, the presence of a ZSU 23-4 antiaircraft weapon, and the possibility of the Taliban possessing Stinger and Redeye antiaircraft missiles that the US had supplied to the mujahideen in the 1980s.

Days before the raids, two AC-130s overflew Rhino to confirm the mission timeline and desensitize ground observers to the sound of planes overhead; they also engaged targets of opportunity en route but detected no enemy on either objective.

On the night of 19 October 2001, before the Rangers dropped, several targets on and around the objective were targeted by U.S. air power, first by bombs dropped from B-2 stealth bombers, then by fire from orbiting AC-130 aircraft. Some sources report that these air strikes resulted in up to 11 Taliban fighters KIAs and several Taliban forces fleeing the area. Following the air strikes, the four MC-130 Combat Talon aircraft flew over the drop zone (DZ) at 800 feet. In zero illumination, the Rangers proceeded to exit the MC-130s. Two Rangers were injured on the jump; they were treated by a team from JSOC's Joint Medical Augmentation Unit which arrived by MC-130 fourteen minutes after C Company, 3rd Ranger Battalion entered the compound.

One company of Rangers, accompanied by a sniper team, secured the area and established strategic positions to defend against potential counterattacks. One enemy fighter was killed by gunfire from soldiers from C Company, 3rd Ranger Battalion. No U.S. casualties were suffered in the operation itself but two Rangers assigned to Combat Search and Rescue element supporting the mission were killed when their MH-60L helicopter crashed at Objective Honda in Pakistan - a temporary staging site used by a company of Rangers from 3/75. The helicopter crashed due to a brownout.

After the Delta operators assaulting Objective Gecko had completed their mission, they returned to Rhino, where they refueled and departed. The Rangers then collapsed the perimeter, boarded two Combat Talons, and also departed. The total time on the ground spent at Rhino was five hours and twenty-four minutes.

== Result ==
Initial reports claimed that 11 Taliban were killed by bombardment from 105mm cannon fire delivered from AC-130 gunships, and 9 others seen fleeing the area. As a result of the raid, a base was set up over the airstrip and named Camp Rhino. It was then handed off to the 15th Marine Expeditionary Unit, who began leading forward operations throughout Kandahar along with the U.S. Army's 101st Airborne Division. Although the operation failed to yield any valuable intelligence, the military authorities still claimed it a success. The video footage from the operation was presented at a Pentagon press conference the day after the operation and distributed to every major news organization in both the United States and abroad. The presence of combat cameramen and a Navy P-3C Orion command and control plane overhead highlighted the importance placed on capturing propaganda footage during the operation. A senior member of the Joint Staff claimed that the operation had strategic value, terrified Omar, and changed the way he thought about the conflict and his safety resulting in becoming isolated and insular.

== Criticism ==
The operation has been criticized by numerous Delta personnel and JSOC officials involved with the planning and execution. According to Sean Naylor, "several senior JSOC officials", including Dailey's senior enlisted adviser Mike Hall, advised Daily against conducting the raids on Rhino and Gecko, due to the high risk from nearby enemy forces, poor backup plans, and low probability that Omar would be on-site at Gecko. The plan was criticized as too large, and overly complex. Due to the fact that it was the Rangers’ first combat jump in over a decade, there were also allegations that some personnel were involved simply to earn their combat jump devices (bronze stars on their jump wings) rather than out of tactical necessity. One operator called the operation a "JRX done for the sake of the cameras," referring to JSOC's regular Joint Readiness Exercises while others compared the casualties from the brownout-induced crash to those previously experienced by the unit's predecessors at Desert One during Operation Eagle Claw.
