= Umgeni River =

River in South Africa

Umgeni River uMngeni (in Zulu)
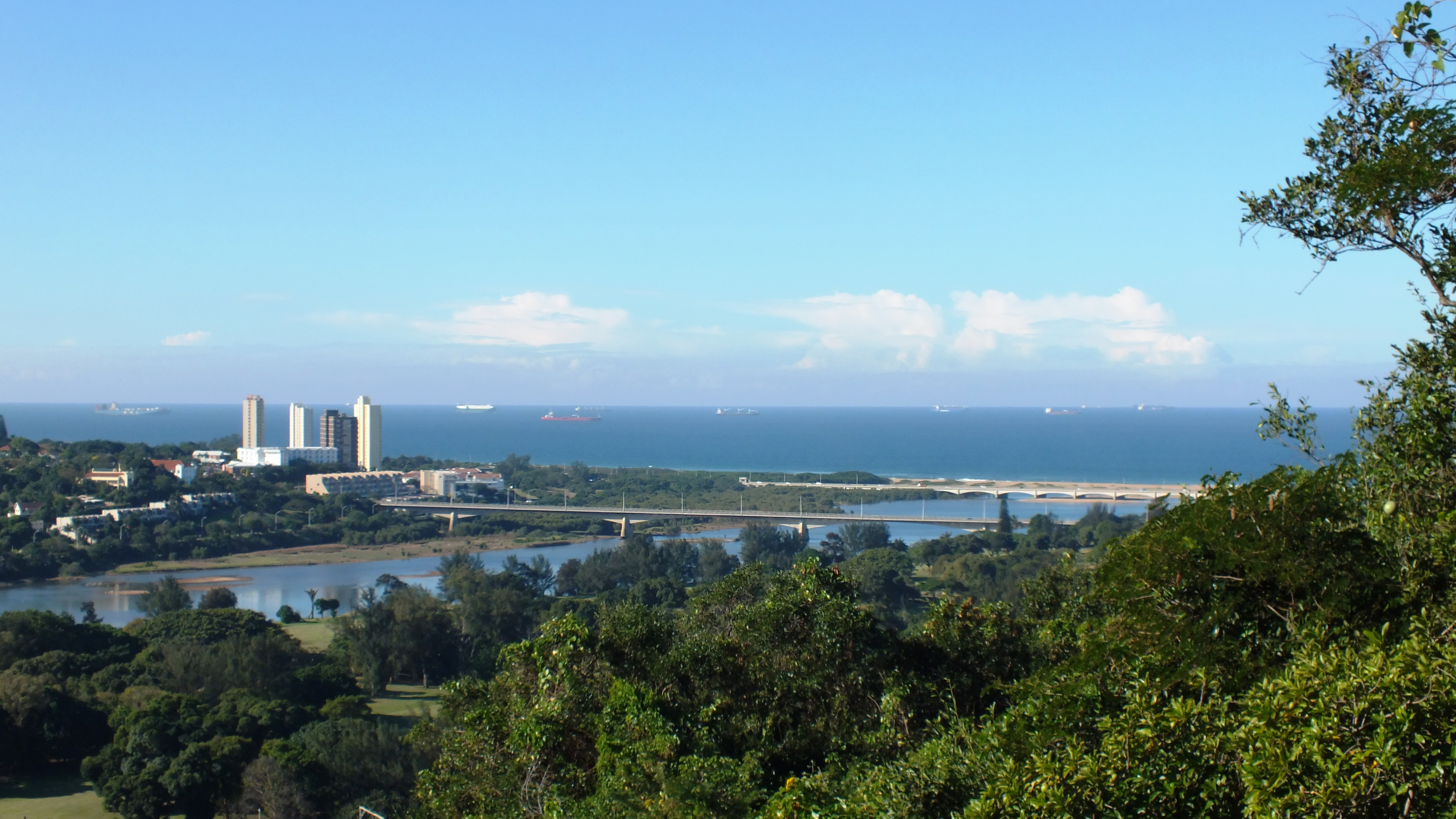
- The Umgeni River's Blue Lagoon at Durban North

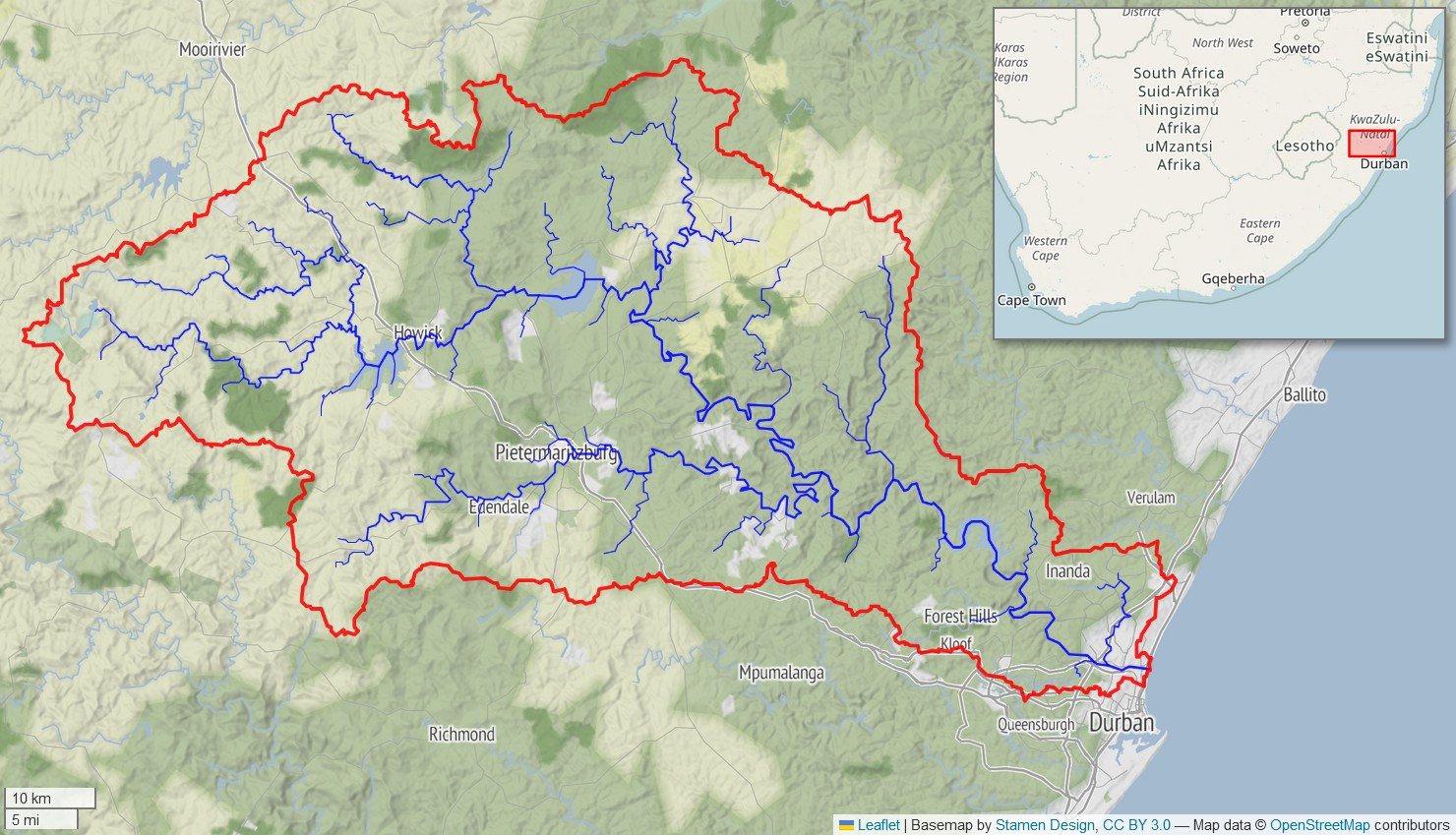
- Map of the Umgeni River watershed

- Location of the Umgeni River mouth

Location
- Country: South Africa
- Region: KwaZulu-Natal

Physical characteristics
- Source: Drakensberg
  - elevation: 1,825 m (5,988 ft)
- Mouth: Indian Ocean
  - location: Durban, South Africa
  - coordinates: 29°48′36″S 31°02′08″E
  - elevation: 0 m (0 ft)
- Length: 232 km (144 mi)
- Basin size: 4,432 km^{2} (1,711 sq mi)

Basin features
- Tributaries
  - left: Msunduzi River

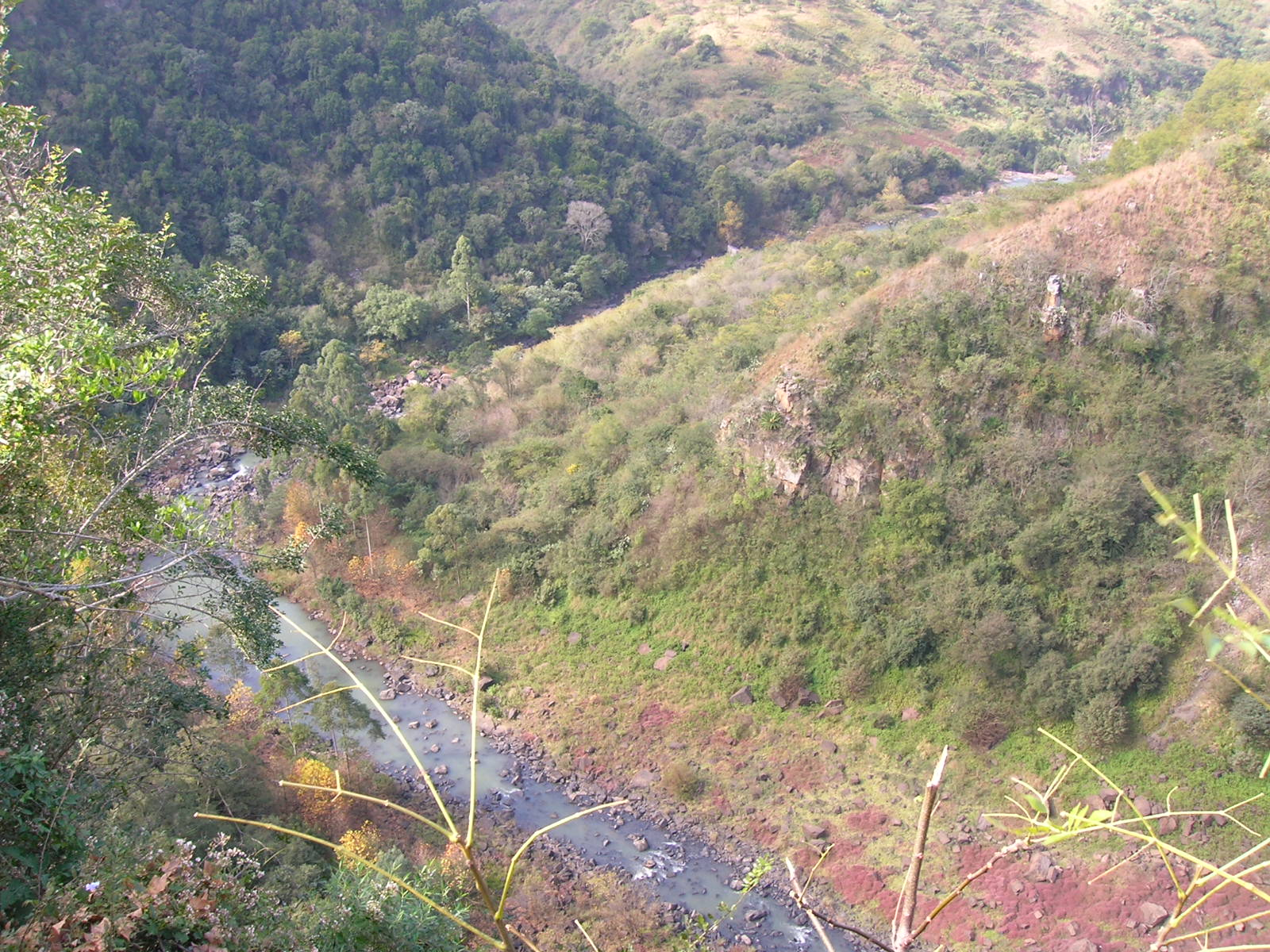
The Umgeni River just below Howick Falls in the KwaZulu-Natal Midlands, photographed during the dry season

The Umgeni River or Mgeni River (Zulu: uMngeni) is a river in KwaZulu-Natal, South Africa. It rises in the "Dargle" in the KZN Midlands, and its mouth is at Durban, some distance north of Durban's natural harbour. It is generally agreed its name means "the river of entrance" in Zulu, though other meanings have been suggested.

The river is approximately 232 kilometres (144 mi) long with a catchment area of 4,432 square kilometres (1,711 sq mi). The Howick Falls are some famous waterfalls on the Mngeni.

== Tributaries ==
A noteworthy tributary is the Msunduzi River, which joins it between Nagle and Inanda dams. Higher up its course, the Msunduzi (or 'Dusi' for short) passes through the KwaZulu-Natal capital Pietermaritzburg. A famous downriver race, the Dusi Canoe Marathon takes place between the capital and Durban, attracting thousands of canoeists for the three-day event held every year January.

A small tributary that has an impact exceeding its size and length is the Lions River which joins the Umgeni about 4 kilometers upstream of Midmar Dam (near Lidgetton). Its significance lies in the fact that it is a part of a water transfer scheme between the Mooi River (Spring Grove Dam) and the Umgeni.

A smaller tributary close to its mouth is the 26-kilometre-long (16 mi) Palmiet River, which should not be confused with the Palmiet River in the Western Cape.

== Dams ==
Presently the Umgeni is part of the Mvoti to Umzimkulu Water Management Area. There are four large dams in its catchment basin:

- Albert Falls Dam
- Inanda Dam
- Midmar Dam
- Nagle Dam

== Ecology ==
The Scaly Yellowfish (Labeobarbus natalensis) is a fish found in the Umgeni River System as well as in the Umzimkhulu, Thukela, Umkhomazi and the Umfolozi. It is a common endemic species in KwaZulu-Natal Province and lives in different habitats between the Drakensberg foothills and the coastal lowlands.

== History ==
It is assumed that Vasco da Gama replenished his fleet's water supply at the Umgeni mouth on Christmas Day, 1497, and so named the region Natal, Portuguese for Christmas. The river then acquired the name "River of Natal".

130 years later the Umgeni was crossed by Nathaniel Isaacs on his way to visit Shaka. At some point before October 1825, settlers and natives led by Francis Farewell began construction of Fort Farewell between the Umgeni River and Port Natal.

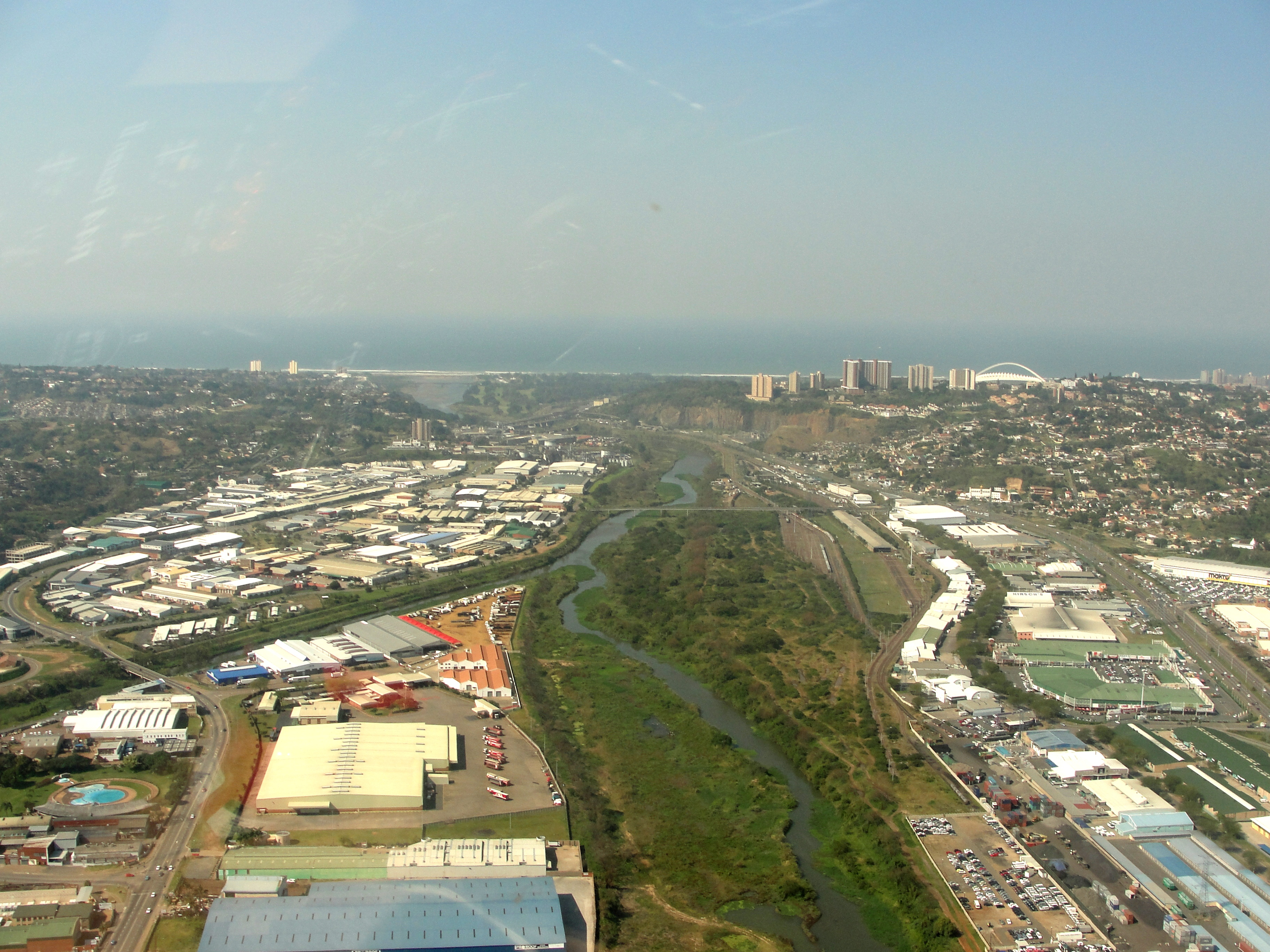
The Umgeni River estuary (Blue Lagoon) and lower reaches flanked by Umgeni Business Park, Umgeni Park, Morningside, Moses Mabhida Stadium, Umgeni River Bird Park and Burman Bush

== See also ==
- Umgeni River Bird Park
- List of rivers of South Africa
- List of reservoirs and dams in South Africa
