= Midmar Dam =

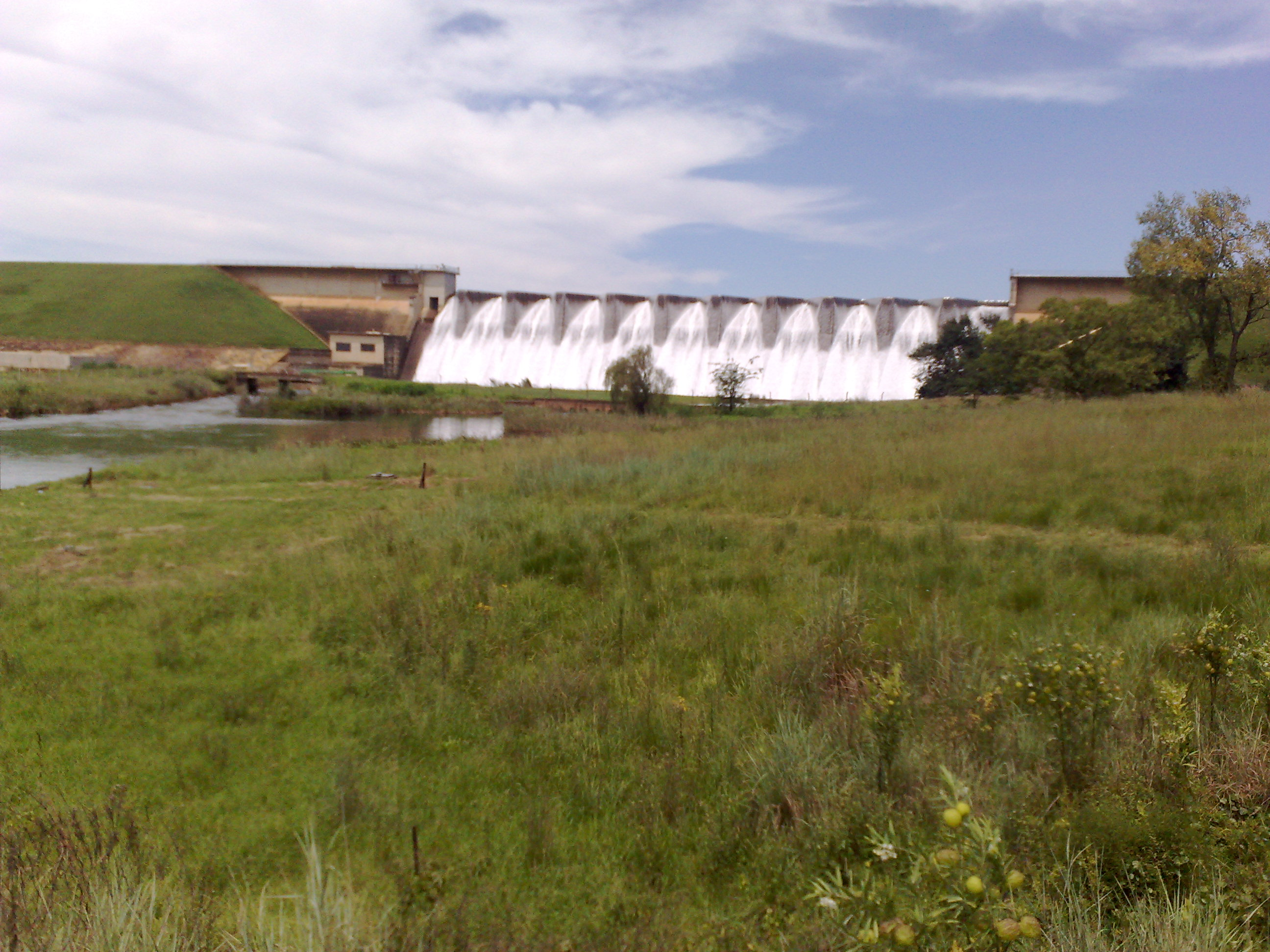
- Midmar Dam

- Location within South Africa
- Official name: Midmar Dam
- Country: South Africa
- Location: Howick, KwaZulu-Natal
- Coordinates: 29°30′S 30°11′E
- Purpose: industrial use
- Opening date: 1965
- Owner: Department of Water Affairs

Dam and spillways
- Type of dam: Combination gravity and earth fill dam
- Impounds: Umgeni River
- Height: 30 metres (98 ft)
- Length: 1,423 metres (4,669 ft)

Reservoir
- Creates: Midmar Dam Reservoir
- Total capacity: 235,000 megalitres (235 hm^{3})
- Surface area: 1,788 hectares (4,420 acres)

Midmar Dam is a combined gravity & earth-fill type dam and recreation area located near Howick and Pietermaritzburg, South Africa. Boating, swimming, waterskiing, picnicking, and fishing are popular pastimes at Midmar Dam. Each year, the Midmar Mile swimming race is held there, which organizers call "the world's largest open water swimming event". Over 20,000 entries were received for the 2009 event. Midmar Dam is located in the Midlands of KwaZulu-Natal. The dam's primary purpose is to serve for municipal and industrial use and its hazard potential has been ranked high (3).

Morgenzon has camping and caravanning sites, both powered and non-powered. The dam also hosts a yacht club, and lock up storage facilities for boats.

Midmar Dam is easily accessible from the N3 motorway.

== See also ==
- List of reservoirs and dams in South Africa
- List of rivers of South Africa
- Umgeni River
- Midmar Mile
