= List of populated places in South Africa =

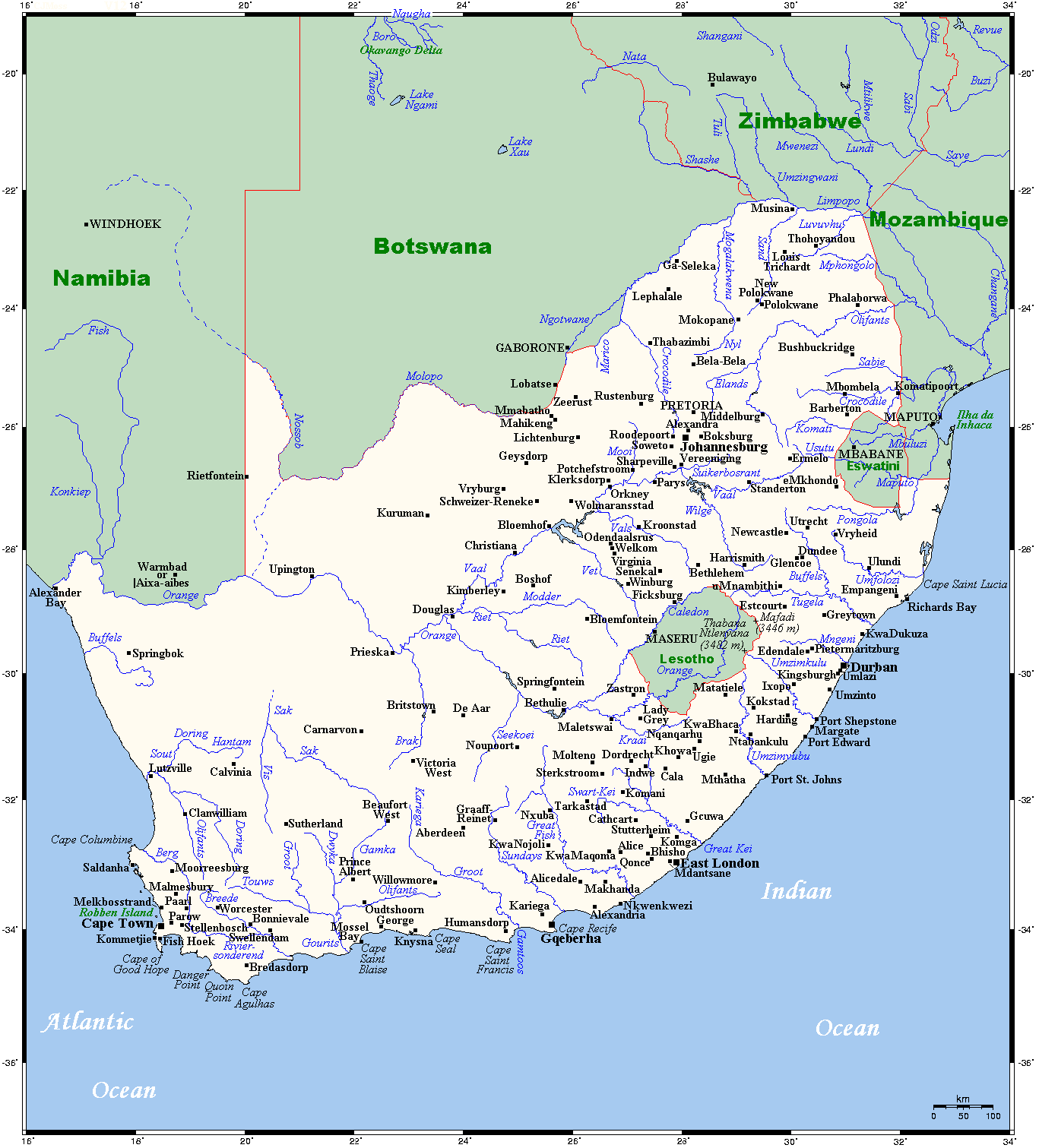
South Africa's cities and main towns

== A ==
Name	Province	Remarks/new name
Aan de Doorns	Western Cape	
Aberdeen	Eastern Cape	
Aberfeldy	Free State	
Abbotsdale	Western Cape	
Acornhoek	Mpumalanga	
Adelaide	Eastern Cape	
Adendorp	Eastern Cape	
Addo	Eastern Cape	
Aggeneys	Northern Cape	
L'Agulhas or Agulhas	Western Cape	also see Cape Agulhas
Amahlongwa	KwaZulu-Natal	
Ahrens	KwaZulu-Natal	
Akasia	Gauteng	northwest of Pretoria
Albertinia	Western Cape	Garden route
Alberton	Gauteng	
Albertshoek	North West	
Alderley	Eastern Cape	
Alexander Bay	Northern Cape	
Alexandria	Eastern Cape	
Alexandra	Gauteng	Township north of Johannesburg
Alettasrus	North West	
Alice	Eastern Cape	Edikeni in Xhosa
Alicedale	Eastern Cape	
Aliwal North	Eastern Cape	
Allandale	Free State	
Allanridge	Free State	
Alldays	Limpopo	
Allep	Free State	
Amalia	North West	
Amalienstein	Western Cape	Klein Karoo
Amandawe	KwaZulu-Natal	
Amanzimtoti	KwaZulu-Natal	
Amersfoort	Mpumalanga	
Amsterdam	Mpumalanga	
Anerley	KwaZulu-Natal	
Arlington	Free State	
Arniston	Western Cape	
Ashton	Western Cape	
Askham	Northern Cape	
Atlantis	Western Cape	
Atteridgeville	Gauteng	
Augrabies	Northern Cape	
Aurora	Western Cape	

== B ==
Name	Province	Remarks/new name
Baardskeerdersbos	Western Cape	
Babelegi	North West	
Babanango	KwaZulu-Natal	
Badplaas	Mpumalanga	
Bailey	Eastern Cape	
Bakerville	North West	
Balfour	Mpumalanga	
Balfour	Eastern Cape	Amatola District
Balgowan	KwaZulu-Natal	
Ballengeich	KwaZulu-Natal	
Ballito	KwaZulu-Natal	
Balmoral	Mpumalanga	
Baltimore	Limpopo	
Bandelierkop	Limpopo	
Bandur	Limpopo	
Bank, Gauteng	Gauteng	
Bankkop	Mpumalanga	
Bapsfontein	Gauteng	
Barakke	Eastern Cape	
Barberspan	North West	also Leghadighadi - 'Deep waterhole'
Barberton	Mpumalanga	
Barkly East	Eastern Cape	
Barkly West	Northern Cape	
Baroe	Eastern Cape	
Barrington	Western Cape	
Barrydale	Western Cape	
Bathurst	Eastern Cape	
Baviaan	Western Cape	
Bazley	KwaZulu-Natal	
Beaufort West	Western Cape	
Beauty	Limpopo	
Bedford	Eastern Cape	
Beestekraal	North West	
Behulpsaam	Eastern Cape	
Beitbridge	Limpopo	
Bekker	Northern Cape	
Bela-Bela	Limpopo	previously Warmbaths
Belfast	Mpumalanga	
Bell	Eastern Cape	
Bellevue	Eastern Cape	
Bellville	Western Cape	
Belmont	Northern Cape	
Benoni	Gauteng	
Berbice	Mpumalanga	
Berea	Western Cape	
Bergplaas	Western Cape	
Bergrivier	Western Cape	
Bergville	KwaZulu-Natal	
Berlin	Eastern Cape	
Bermolli	Northern Cape	
Besters	KwaZulu-Natal	
Bethal	Mpumalanga	
Bethanie	North West	
Bethelsdorp	Eastern Cape	
Bethlehem	Free State	
Bethulie	Free State	
Bettiesdam	Mpumalanga	
Betty's Bay	Western Cape	
Bewley	North West	
Biesiesfontein	Western Cape	
Biesiespoort	Northern Cape	
Biesiesvlei	North West	
Biggarsberg	KwaZulu-Natal	
Bhisho	Eastern Cape	Capital of Eastern Cape
Bitterfontein	Western Cape	West Coast
Bityi	Eastern Cape	
Bloemfontein	Free State	
Bloemhof	North West	
Blouberg	Western Cape	Part of the City of Cape Town
Bluewater Bay	Eastern Cape	
Boboyi	KwaZulu-Natal	
Boipatong	Gauteng	
Boksburg	Gauteng	
Bonnievale	Western Cape	
Bonza Bay	Eastern Cape	Part of East London
Bophelong	Gauteng	
Bosbokrand	Mpumalanga	
Boshof	Free State	
Boston	KwaZulu-Natal	
Bothaville	Free State	
Botshabelo	Free State	
Brackenfell	Western Cape	
Brakpan	Gauteng	
Brandfort	Free State	
Braunschweig	Eastern Cape	
Bray	North West	
Bredasdorp	Western Cape	
Breyten	Mpumalanga	
Brits	North West	
Britstown	Northern Cape	
Broederstroom	North West	
Bronkhorstspruit	Gauteng	
Buffelsjagbaai	Western Cape	
Bultfontein	Free State	
Bulwer	KwaZulu-Natal	
Burgersdorp	Eastern Cape	
Burgersfort	Limpopo	
Boompie Alleen	Free State	
Butterworth	Eastern Cape	now Gcuwa

== C ==
Name	Province	Remarks/new name
Cala	Eastern Cape	
Caledon	Western Cape	
Calitzdorp	Western Cape	
Calvert	KwaZulu-Natal	
Calvinia	Northern Cape	
Cambria	Eastern Cape	
Campbell	Northern Cape	
Camperdown	KwaZulu-Natal	
Camps Bay	Western Cape	Part of Cape Town
Candover	KwaZulu-Natal	
Cannon Rocks	Eastern Cape	
Cape St. Francis	Eastern Cape	
Cape Town	Western Cape	
Cape Vidal	KwaZulu-Natal	
Carletonville	Gauteng	
Carlow	Limpopo	
Carlsonia	North West	
Carlton	Northern Cape	
Carnarvon	Northern Cape	
Carolina	Mpumalanga	
Catalina Bay	KwaZulu-Natal	
Carolusberg	Northern Cape	
Cathcart	Eastern Cape	
Cato Ridge	KwaZulu-Natal	
Cedarville	KwaZulu-Natal	
Centurion	Gauteng	
Ceres	Western Cape	
Chalumna	Eastern Cape	
Chantelle	Gauteng	
Charl Cilliers	Mpumalanga	
Charlestown	KwaZulu-Natal	
Chintsa	Eastern Cape	
Chrissiesmeer	Mpumalanga	
Christiana	North West	
Chuniespoort	Limpopo	
Churchaven	Western Cape	
Citrusdal	Western Cape	
Clansthal	KwaZulu-Natal	
Clanwilliam	Western Cape	
Claremont	Western Cape	Part of Cape Town
Clarens	Free State	
Clarkebury	Eastern Cape	
Clarkson	Western Cape	
Clermont	KwaZulu-Natal	
Clewer	Mpumalanga	
Clifford	Eastern Cape	
Clifton	Western Cape	Part of Cape Town
Clocolan	Free State	
Coalville	Mpumalanga	
Coega	Eastern Cape	
Concordia	Northern Cape	
Coffee Bay	Eastern Cape	
Cofimvaba	Eastern Cape	
Coghlan	Eastern Cape	
Colchester	Eastern Cape	
Coleford	Eastern Cape	
Colesberg	Northern Cape	
Colenso	KwaZulu-Natal	
Coligny	North West	
Colston	Northern Cape	
Commondale	Mpumalanga	
Constantia	Western Cape	Part of Cape Town
Copperton	Northern Cape	
Cornelia	Free State	
Cork	Mpumalanga	
Cookhouse	Eastern Cape	
Cradock	Eastern Cape	
Craigieburn	KwaZulu-Natal	
Cullinan	Gauteng	

== D ==
Name	Province	Remarks/new name
Dalton	KwaZulu-Natal	
Danielskuil	Northern Cape	
Dannhauser	KwaZulu-Natal	
Darling	Western Cape	
Darnall	KwaZulu-Natal	
Daveyton	Gauteng	
De Aar	Northern Cape	
Dealesville	Free State	
De Doorns	Western Cape	
De Kelders	Western Cape	
Delareyville	North West	
Delmas	Mpumalanga	
Delportshoop	Northern Cape	
Deneysville	Free State	
Derby	North West	
De Rust	Western Cape	
Despatch	Eastern Cape	
Devon	Gauteng	
Dewetsdorp	Free State	
Dibeng	Northern Cape	
Dingleton	Northern Cape	
Döhne	Eastern Cape	
Doonside	KwaZulu-Natal	
Doringbaai	Western Cape	
Dordrecht	Eastern Cape	
Douglas	Northern Cape	
Drummond	KwaZulu-Natal	
Dududu	KwaZulu-Natal	
Duduza	Gauteng	
Duiwelskloof	Limpopo	renamed Modjadjiskloof
Dullstroom	Mpumalanga	
Dundee	KwaZulu-Natal	
Durban	KwaZulu-Natal	
Durbanville	Western Cape	
Dutywa	Eastern Cape	
Dysselsdorp	Western Cape	

== E ==
Name	Province	Remarks/new name
Edenburg	Free State	
Edenvale	Gauteng	
Edenville	Free State	
Eendekuil	Western Cape	
East London	Eastern Cape	Xhosa: eMonti, part of Buffalo City
ekuPhakameni	KwaZulu-Natal	
Elandsbaai	Western Cape	
Elandslaagte	KwaZulu-Natal	
Elim	Western Cape	
Elgin	Western Cape	
Elliot	Eastern Cape	
eMdloti	KwaZulu-Natal	
Empangeni	KwaZulu-Natal	
Ermelo	Mpumalanga	
Eshowe	KwaZulu-Natal	
Estcourt	KwaZulu-Natal	
Evaton	Gauteng	
Excelsior	Free State	

== F ==
Name	Province	Remarks/new name
Faure	Western Cape	
Fauresmith	Free State	
Ficksburg	Free State	
Firgrove	Western Cape	
Fisherhaven	Western Cape	
Fish Hoek	Western Cape	
Flagstaff	Eastern Cape	
Fochville	Gauteng	
Fort Beaufort	Eastern Cape	
Fouriesburg	Free State	
Frankfort	Free State	
Franklin	KwaZulu-Natal	
Franskraal	Western Cape	
Franschhoek	Western Cape	
Fraserburg	Northern Cape	

== G ==
Name	Province	Remarks/new name
Ga-Motlagomo	Limpopo	
Gansbaai	Western Cape	
Ganyesa	North West	
Ga-Rankuwa	North West	
Gcuwa	Eastern Cape	previously Butterworth
Genadendal	Western Cape	
George	Western Cape	
Germiston	Gauteng	
Giyani	Limpopo	
Glencoe	KwaZulu-Natal	
Gonubie	Eastern Cape	
Gordon's Bay	Western Cape	
Gouda	Western Cape	
Graaff-Reinet	Eastern Cape	
Graafwater	Western Cape	
Grabouw	Western Cape	
Grahamstown	Eastern Cape	renamed to Makhanda
Graskop	Mpumalanga	
Gravelotte, Limpopo	Limpopo	
Greylingstad	Mpumalanga	
Greyton	Western Cape	
Greytown	KwaZulu-Natal	
Griekwastad	Northern Cape	formerly Griquatown
Groblersdal	Limpopo	
Groblershoop	Northern Cape	
Groot Marico	North West	

== H ==
Name	Province	Remarks/new name
Haenertsburg	Limpopo	
Hammanskraal	Gauteng	
Hankey	Eastern Cape	
Harding	KwaZulu-Natal	
Harrismith	Free State	
Hartbeespoort	North West Province	
Hattingspruit	KwaZulu-Natal	
Hazyview	Mpumalanga	
Hectorspruit	Mpumalanga	
Heidelberg	Gauteng	
Heidelberg	Western Cape	
Heilbron	Free State	
Henley on Klip	Gauteng	
Hennenman	Free State	
Hermanus	Western Cape	
Hertzogville	Free State	
Hibberdene	KwaZulu-Natal	
Hillcrest	KwaZulu-Natal	
Hilton	KwaZulu-Natal	
Himeville	KwaZulu-Natal	
Hluhluwe	KwaZulu-Natal	
Hobhouse	Free State	
Hoedspruit	Limpopo	
Hofmeyr	Eastern Cape	
Hoopstad	Free State	
Hopefield	Western Cape	
Hopetown	Northern Cape	
Howick	KwaZulu-Natal	
Humansdorp	Eastern Cape	

== I ==
Name	Province	Remarks/new name
Ibhayi	Eastern Cape	Collection of townships north of Port Elizabeth
Ifafa Beach	KwaZulu-Natal	
Illovo Beach	KwaZulu-Natal	
Indwe	Eastern Cape	
Impendle	KwaZulu-Natal	
Inanda	KwaZulu-Natal	
Ingwavuma	KwaZulu-Natal	
Irene	Gauteng	
Isando	Gauteng	
Isipingo	KwaZulu-Natal	
Ixopo	KwaZulu-Natal	
Izingolweni	KwaZulu-Natal	eZinqoleni

== J ==
Name	Province	Remarks/new name
Jamestown	Western Cape	
Jansenville	Eastern Cape	
Jacobsdal	Free State	
Jagersfontein	Free State	
Jan Kempdorp	Northern Cape	
Jeffreys Bay	Eastern Cape	
Johannesburg	Gauteng	

== K ==
Name	Province	Remarks/new name
Kaapmuiden	Mpumalanga	
Karridene	KwaZulu-Natal	
Katlehong	Gauteng	
Kempton Park	Gauteng	
Kenton-on-Sea	Eastern Cape	
Kestell	Free State	
Keurboomstrand	Western Cape	
Kgotsong	Free State	
Khayelitsha	Western Cape	
Kimberley	Northern Cape	
Kingsburgh	KwaZulu-Natal	
King William's Town	Eastern Cape	
Kinross	Mpumalanga	
Kirkwood	Eastern Cape	
Klapmuts	Western Cape	
Klerksdorp	North West Province	
Kloof	KwaZulu-Natal	
Knysna	Western Cape	
Koffiefontein	Free State	
Kokstad	KwaZulu-Natal	
Komatipoort	Mpumalanga	
Kommetjie	Western Cape	
Koppies	Free State	
Kraaifontein	Western Cape	
Kromdraai	Gauteng	
Kroonstad	Free State	
Kriel	Mpumalanga	
Krugersdorp	Gauteng	now part of Mogale City
Kuils River	Western Cape	
KwaCele	KwaZulu-Natal	
KwaDukuza	KwaZulu-Natal	previously Stanger
KwaMashu	KwaZulu-Natal	
KwaMhlanga	Mpumalanga	
KwaThema	Gauteng	

== L ==
Name	Province	Remarks/new name
Ladybrand	Free State	
Lady Frere	Eastern Cape	
Lady Grey	Eastern Cape	
Ladysmith	KwaZulu-Natal	Mnambithi
Laingsburg	Western Cape	
La Lucia	KwaZulu-Natal	
La Mercy	KwaZulu-Natal	
Lambert's Bay	Western Cape	
Lenasia	Gauteng	
Lephalale	Limpopo	previously Ellisras
Lichtenburg	North West	
Lindley	Free State	
Lyttelton	Gauteng	
Loopspruit	Mpumalanga	
Louis Trichardt	Limpopo	Known as "Makhado" June 2003 - March 2007
Louwsburg	KwaZulu-Natal	Zulu name: Ngotshe
Luckhoff	Free State	
Lydenburg	Mpumalanga	

== M ==
Name	Province	Remarks/new name
Machadodorp	Mpumalanga	
Maclear	Eastern Cape	
Madadeni	KwaZulu-Natal	
Mafikeng	North West	
Magabeni	KwaZulu-Natal	
Magaliesburg	Gauteng	
Mahlabatini	KwaZulu-Natal	
Makeleketla	Free State	Adjacent to Winburg
Malelane	Mpumalanga	
Mamelodi	Gauteng	
Mandini	KwaZulu-Natal	
Marble Hall	Limpopo	
Margate	KwaZulu-Natal	
Marquard	Free State	
Matatiele	Eastern Cape	
Mathulini	KwaZulu-Natal	
Matjiesfontein	Western Cape	
Mbombela	Mpumalanga	previously Nelspruit
Melkbosstrand	Western Cape	
Melkhoutfontein	Western Cape	
Melmoth	KwaZulu-Natal	
Melville	KwaZulu-Natal	
Memel	Free State	
Merrivale	KwaZulu-Natal	
Meyerton	Gauteng	
Middelburg	Eastern Cape	
Middelburg	Mpumalanga	
Midrand	Gauteng	
Milnerton	Western Cape	
Mkuze	KwaZulu-Natal	
Mmabatho	North West Province	
Modder River	Northern Cape	
Modimolle	Limpopo	(previously Nylstroom)
Mokopane	Limpopo	(previously Potgietersrus)
Molteno	Eastern Cape	
Mooirivier	KwaZulu-Natal	
Morgenzon	Mpumalanga	
Mount Edgecombe	KwaZulu-Natal	
Mount Fletcher	Eastern Cape	
Mossel Bay	Western Cape	
Mpumalanga	KwaZulu-Natal	
Mthatha	Eastern Cape	
Mthwalume	KwaZulu-Natal	
Mtubatuba	KwaZulu-Natal	Nkomokayixoshwa
Mtunzini	KwaZulu-Natal	
Muden	KwaZulu-Natal	
Muizenberg	Western Cape	
Muldersdrift	Gauteng	
Murchison	KwaZulu-Natal	
Musina	Limpopo	(previously Messina)

== N ==
Name	Province	Remarks/new name
Naboomspruit	Limpopo	new name Mookgophong
Newcastle	KwaZulu-Natal	
New Germany	KwaZulu-Natal	
New Hanover	KwaZulu-Natal	
Engcobo	Eastern Cape	
Nieu-Bethesda	Eastern Cape	
Nigel	Gauteng	
Nongoma	KwaZulu-Natal	
Noordhoek	Western Cape	
Nottingham Road	KwaZulu-Natal	
Nquthu	KwaZulu-Natal	

== O ==
Name	Province	Remarks/new name
Odendaalsrus	Free State	
Ogies	Mpumalanga	
Ohrigstad	Mpumalanga	
Orania, Northern Cape	Northern Cape	
Oranjeville	Free State	
Orchards	Gauteng	
Orkney	North West	
oThongathi	KwaZulu-Natal	
Oudtshoorn	Western Cape	
Oyster Bay	Eastern Cape	

== P ==
Name	Province	Remarks/new name
Paarl	Western Cape	
Palm Beach	KwaZulu-Natal	
Park Rynie	KwaZulu-Natal	
Parys	Free State	
Patensie	Eastern Cape	
Paterson	Eastern Cape	
Paulpietersburg	KwaZulu-Natal	
Paul Roux	Free State	
Pennington	KwaZulu-Natal	
Perdekop	Mpumalanga	
Petrusburg	Free State	
Petrus Steyn	Free State	
Phalaborwa	Limpopo	
Philadelphia	Western Cape	
Philippolis	Free State	
Phuthaditjhaba	Free State	Qwaqwa
Piet Retief	Mpumalanga	
Pietermaritzburg	KwaZulu-Natal	Mgungundlovu/Mgungundlovana
Piketberg	Western Cape	
Pilgrim's Rest	Mpumalanga	
Pinetown	KwaZulu-Natal	
Plettenberg Bay	Western Cape	
Plooysburg	Northern Cape	
Pniel	Western Cape	
Polokwane	Limpopo	previously Pietersburg
Pomeroy	KwaZulu-Natal	
Pongola	KwaZulu-Natal	
Port Alfred	Eastern Cape	
Port Edward	KwaZulu-Natal	
Port Elizabeth	Eastern Cape	renamed Gqeberha
Port Shepstone	KwaZulu-Natal	
Port St. Johns	Eastern Cape	
Potchefstroom	North West	
Pretoria	Gauteng	Tshwane
Prieska	Northern Cape	
Prins Albert	Western Cape	

== Q ==
Name	Province	Remarks/new name
Queensburgh	KwaZulu-Natal	
Queenstown	Eastern Cape	Komani

== R ==
Name	Province	Remarks/new name
Ramsgate	KwaZulu-Natal	
Randburg	Gauteng	
Randfontein	Gauteng	
Ratanda	Gauteng	
Reddersburg	Free State	
Reitz	Free State	
Richards Bay	KwaZulu-Natal	
Richmond	Northern Cape	
Riebeek Kasteel	Western Cape	
Robertson	Western Cape	
Roodepoort	Gauteng	
Rooihuiskraal	Gauteng	
Rosendal	Free State	
Rouxville	Free State	
Rustenburg	North West	Phokeng

== S ==
Name	Province	Remarks/new name
Sabie	Mpumalanga	
Salt Rock	KwaZulu-Natal	
Sandton	Gauteng	
Sannieshof	North West	
Sasolburg	Free State	
Schweizer-Reneke	North West	
Scottburgh	KwaZulu-Natal	
Sebokeng	Gauteng	
Secunda	Mpumalanga	
Senekal	Free State	
Sezela	KwaZulu-Natal	
Shakaskraal	KwaZulu-Natal	
Sharpeville	Gauteng	
Shawela	Limpopo	
Shelly Beach	KwaZulu-Natal	
Smithfield	Free State	
Somerset East	Eastern Cape	
Somerset West	Western Cape	
Soshanguve	Gauteng	
Southbroom	KwaZulu-Natal	
Soweto	Gauteng	
Springbok	Northern Cape	
Springfontein	Free State	
Springs	Gauteng	
Standerton	Mpumalanga	
Stilfontein	North West	
Stellenbosch	Western Cape	
Steynsburg	Eastern Cape	
Steynsrus	Free State	
St. Faith's	KwaZulu-Natal	
St Francis Bay	Eastern Cape	
St Lucia	KwaZulu-Natal	
St Georges Strand	Eastern Cape	
St Michael's-on-sea	KwaZulu-Natal	
Strand	Western Cape	
Strydenburg	Northern Cape	
Stutterheim	Eastern Cape	
Summerstrand	Eastern Cape	
Swartberg	Western Cape	
Swartkops	Eastern Cape	
Swellendam	Western Cape	
Swinburne	Free State	

== T ==
Name	Province	Remarks/new name
Tarkastad	Eastern Cape	
Tembisa	Gauteng	
Thaba Nchu	Free State	
Thabazimbi	Limpopo	
Theunissen	Free State	
Thohoyandou	Limpopo	
Thokoza	Gauteng	
Tinley Manor Beach	KwaZulu-Natal	
Trichardt	Mpumalanga	
Trompsburg	Free State	
Tsakane	Gauteng	
Tugela Ferry	KwaZulu-Natal	
Tulbagh	Western Cape	
Tweeling	Free State	
Tweespruit	Free State	

== U ==
Name	Province	Remarks/new name
Ubombo	KwaZulu-Natal	
Uitenhage	Eastern Cape	Kariega
Ulundi	KwaZulu-Natal	
Umbogintwini	KwaZulu-Natal	eZimbokodweni
Umgababa	KwaZulu-Natal	
Umhlali	KwaZulu-Natal	
uMhlanga	KwaZulu-Natal	
Umkomaas	KwaZulu-Natal	eMkhomazi
Umlazi	KwaZulu-Natal	eMlaza
Umtentweni	KwaZulu-Natal	eMthenteni
Umzimkhulu	KwaZulu-Natal	
Umzinto	KwaZulu-Natal	eMuziwezinto
Umzumbe	KwaZulu-Natal	
Underberg	KwaZulu-Natal	
Upington	Northern Cape	
Uniondale, Western Cape	Western Cape	
Utrecht	KwaZulu-Natal	
Uvongo	KwaZulu-Natal	

== V ==
Name	Province	Remarks/new name
Vaalbank	Mpumalanga	
Vaalwater	Limpopo	
Vanderbijlpark	Gauteng	
Van Reenen	KwaZulu-Natal	
Van Stadensrus	Free State	
Ventersburg	Free State	
Vereeniging	Gauteng	
Verkeerdevlei	Free State	
Verulam	KwaZulu-Natal	
Victoria West	Northern Cape	
Viljoenskroon	Free State	
Villiers	Free State	
Virginia	KwaZulu-Natal	
Vivo	Limpopo	
Volksrust	Mpumalanga	
Vosloorus	Gauteng	
Vrede	Free State	
Vredefort	Free State	
Vryburg	North West	
Vryheid	KwaZulu-Natal	

== W ==
Name	Province	Remarks/new name
Wakkerstroom	Mpumalanga	
Warden	Free State	
Warner Beach	KwaZulu-Natal	
Warrenton	Northern Cape	
Wartburg	KwaZulu-Natal	
Wasbank	KwaZulu-Natal	
Waterfall	KwaZulu-Natal	
Waterval Boven	Mpumalanga	
Waterval Onder	Mpumalanga	
Wedela	Gauteng	
Weenen	KwaZulu-Natal	
Welkom	Free State	Mvela
Wellington	Western Cape	
Wepener	Free State	
Wesselsbron	Free State	
Westonaria	Gauteng	
Westville	KwaZulu-Natal	
White River	Mpumalanga	
Whittlesea	Eastern Cape	Hewu
Wilderness	Western Cape	
Williston	Northern Cape	
Winburg	Free State	
Winkelspruit	KwaZulu-Natal	
Winterton	KwaZulu-Natal	
Witbank	Mpumalanga	Emalahleni
Wolmaransstad	North West	
Worcester	Western Cape	

== Y ==
Name	Province	Remarks/new name
York	KwaZulu-Natal	
Yzerfontein	Western Cape	

== Z ==
Name	Province	Remarks/new name
Zastron	Free State	
Zeerust	North West	
Zwelitsha	Eastern Cape	

== See also ==
- Housing in South Africa
- South African property law
