= Magabeni =

- Magabeni
- Location within KwaZulu-Natal Location within South Africa
- Coordinates: 30.170°S 30.767°E
- Country: South Africa
- Province: KwaZulu-Natal
- Municipality: eThekwini

Government
  - Councillor: Jane Naidoo (Inkatha Freedom Party)

Area
  - Total: 1.74 km^{2} (0.67 sq mi)

Population (2024)
  - Total: 4,928
  - Density: 2,830/km^{2} (7,340/sq mi)

Racial makeup (2011)
  - Black African: 99.56%
  - Coloured: 0.1%
  - Indian/Asian: 0.1%

First languages (2011)
  - Zulu: 93.6%
  - Xhosa: 2.2%
  - English: 1.5%
  - Other: 2.7%
- Time zone: UTC+2 (SAST)
- Postal code (street): 4170
- Area code: 039

Magabeni (also known as Magabheni) is a small township in the KwaZulu-Natal province of South Africa.

Magabeni is part of eThekwini Metropolitan Municipality. The nearest towns/neighbourhoods to Magabeni township are eMkhomazi (Umkomaas), Roseneath, Craigieburn, Widenham, Clasnthal, and Ilfracombe. The nearest rural localities are Crowder Farm, Empisini Nature Reserve, Ezembeni, Thoyana, Danganya, Umgababa, Luthuli, Mnini Dam, and Finningley Estates.

It was designed as a suburb of Durban. Magabeni lies 4km from the Indian Ocean coast. The uMkhomazi River is located some 1km south of the township. Sappi Saiccor is the major industrial complex in the area, also located about 1km in the south. The township is served by a railway station which lies 3km to the east and the N2 freeway, which lies to the east, Shell Ultra City petrol station is located about 3km to the east. R197 Route serves the township and nearby townships such as Roseneath and Craigieburn, it serves Saiccor Mill as well.

The late legendary journalist, S'busiso Mseleku was raised in Magabeni.
