= Illovo, KwaZulu-Natal =

Illovo
- Location within KwaZulu-Natal Location within South Africa
- Coordinates: 30.068°S 30.831°E
- Country: South Africa
- Province: KwaZulu-Natal
- Municipality: eThekwini
- Established: Amanzimtoti

Area
  - Total: 8.20 km^{2} (3.17 sq mi)

Population (2001)
  - Total: 10,280
  - Density: 1,250/km^{2} (3,250/sq mi)
- Time zone: UTC+2 (SAST)
- Postal code (street): 4126
- PO box: 4150

Illovo is a town in EThekwini in the KwaZulu-Natal province of South Africa.

Popular coastal resort on the Natal South Coast, between Winklespruit and Karridene, 34 km south-west of Durban. It takes its name from the Lovu River. The adapted form Illovo has also been applied to a sugar estate and thence to the Illovo Sugar company.
