= Illovo =

Illovo may refer to:

- Illovo Sugar, a sugar producer based in Umhlanga, KwaZulu-Natal, South Africa
- Illovo, KwaZulu-Natal
- Illovo Beach
- Illovo, Gauteng, a suburb of Johannesburg, South Africa
