= Warner Beach =

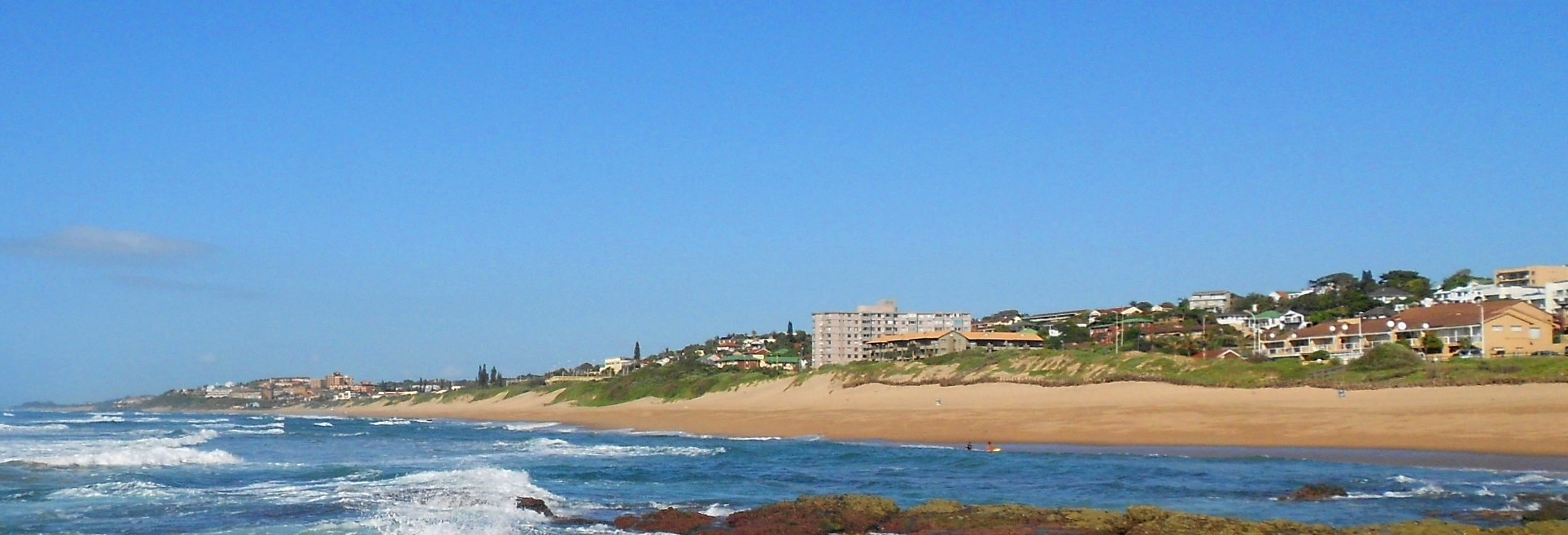

- Location within KwaZulu-Natal Location within South Africa
- Coordinates: 30.085°S 30.862°E
- Country: South Africa
- Province: KwaZulu-Natal
- Municipality: eThekwini
- Main Place: Kingsburgh

Area
  - Total: 2.04 km^{2} (0.79 sq mi)

Population (2011)
  - Total: 3,453
  - Density: 1,690/km^{2} (4,380/sq mi)

Racial makeup (2011)
  - Black African: 10.5%
  - Coloured: 2.7%
  - Indian/Asian: 4.4%
  - White: 82.1%
  - Other: 0.4%

First languages (2011)
  - English: 63.7%
  - Afrikaans: 28.3%
  - Zulu: 4.8%
  - Other: 3.3%
- Time zone: UTC+2 (SAST)
- Postal code (street): 4126
- PO box: 4140
- Area code: 031

Warner Beach is a small resort town south of the Little Manzimtoti River in KwaZulu-Natal, South Africa, and it forms part of eThekwini. It was laid out by surveyor P.A. Warner as a residential area in 1910 for government pensioners.

== History ==
Fred Mohnhaupt and Gus Brown are the forefounders of Warner Beach. Gus Brown was born in Durban and lived on the Berea. Very close friends, Gus and Fred both worked in the wool trade in Durban. Fred, who was his superior and a wealthy businessman, made his money in the wool trade in South Africa. Both loved the entertainment world, and had many friends in Durban and afar, together travelling abroad on many occasions.

With a vision, in 1914, Gus and Fred moved to Warner Beach, where Fred purchased 82 acres of vacant land; the outlined area was roughly Kingsway (Warner Beach School) to St Winifreds near Almond Rd from north to south and Coastline to Dimple Lea Rd vicinity from east to west.

Fred had the financial investment and Gus the vision and ideas, so together they developed Warner Beach. An infrastructure on their land was developed, with basic gravel tracks, buildings, etc. Gus Brown Road and other roads were built as they are today. They took on a local man, Ray Edkins, to farm their land so as to supply meat and vegetables to the hotel and area.

Gus Brown Road leads to a hotel, which they had built, the Strelitzia Hotel, which attracted visitors, and many of their friends travelled out from Durban to stay at Warner Beach. The hotel hosted many dances and a variety of entertainments. During and after the war, soldiers and airman visited Warner Beach and stayed at the hotel. Demand grew, so Fred built another hotel on his land, the Strand Hotel. Warner Beach became a popular destination for holiday seekers, attracting visitors from the Transvaal and further afield. Guests enjoyed participating in the many social activities set up by Fred and Gus at their hotels.

=== Books and authors ===
A book about the history of Warner Beach was written and published by Carol Lane.

== Geography ==
Forming part of the coastal town of Kingsburgh, Warner Beach is situated between the adjacent coastal areas of Winklespruit to the south and Doonside to the north.

Temperatures are mild and pleasant throughout the year, due to the temperature-stabilizing effect of the warm ocean current that flows in the coastal waters. A pleasant sea breeze can often be experienced with a cool temperature and a pleasant sea aroma. The vegetation is normally green throughout the year.

== Culture and contemporary lifestyle ==
Warner Beach is a coastal village with a residential area and tourist, educational, and shopping facilities. Warner Beach still retains much of its quaint seaside character with little to no development and its main street, Kingsway which has no traffic lights whatsoever, is lined with the occasional book shop, hairdresser, petrol stations, bottle shops, real estate agents, hardware store and boutique stores amongst others. Furthermore it is unique in that for some part of Kingsway's length in Warner Beach, it is separated from the beach only by the railway line which runs parallel to the road.

=== Beaches ===
Warner Beach offers excellent conditions for surfing; it is precisely for this reason that this coastal village has produced some world-class surfers. Nearby lies ‘Aliwal Shoal,’ which is undoubtedly one of the best dive sites in the area. Popular activities here include kite surfing, paddle skiing, canoeing, beach walking, scuba diving, jogging, and fishing.

A name that is often used for Warner Beach is Baggies Beach, but contention exists as to the validity of the name. Investigations show that the name Baggies Beach was originally used for St Winifred's Beach, which is also known as Subway Beach. The beach known as Warner Beach was also called Crane Beach, due to the presence of a construction crane at a building site next to the beach.

An excellent short film featuring Warner Beach at sunrise and filmed by Dan Dedekind is available here.

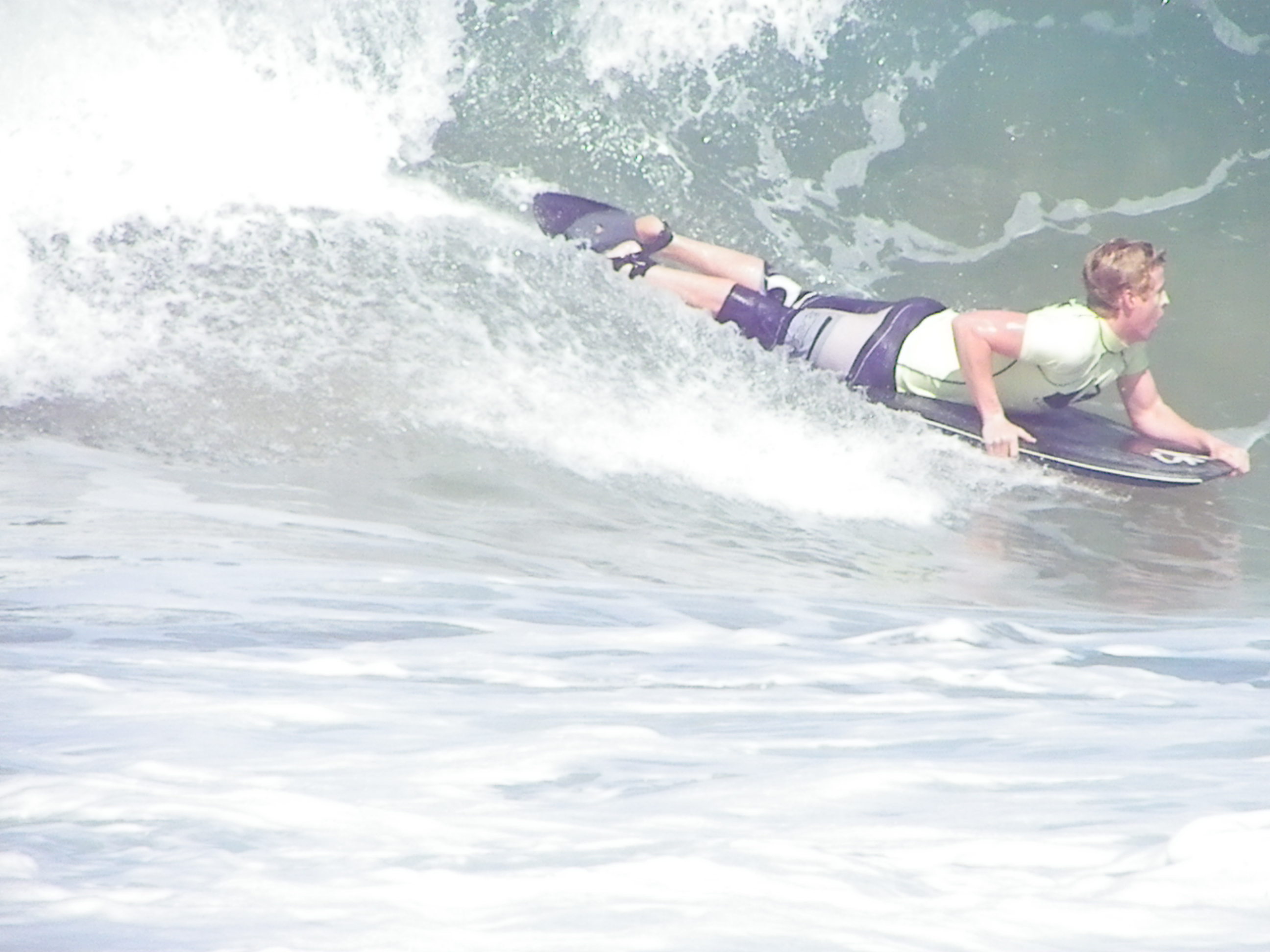
Body boarding the shore-break at Baggies, Warner Beach

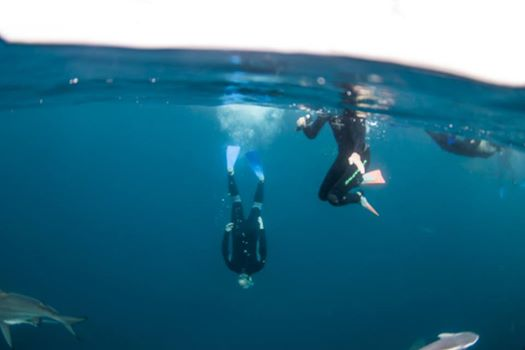
Scuba diving at a diving spot nearby

=== Marine ecosystems ===
Whales and dolphins can at times be seen in the Indian Ocean adjacent to the area. The annual "Sardine Run" is a migration of huge schools of fish, attracting tourists and fishermen.

== Developments ==
Developments in the area include:

- Blasting out the rocks of the Warner Beach tidal pool was done for Strelitzia Hotel guests to use.
- Establishing a bowling green in Warner Beach attracted visitors from all over.
- Donated land was used for a small church to be built so that weddings could be held in Warner Beach; today it is St Mary's Church.
- Donated land also was used for a hall to be built to house various functions, known as the Strelitzia Hall for many years.

In about 1946, Fred Mohnhaupt and Gus Brown finally sold both the Strelitzia and Strand Hotels and moved back to Durban, where they settled down to their retirements.

== Transport ==
=== Rail ===
The main commuter line between Durban and Kelso, the South Coast Line, passes through Warner Beach and its railway station currently operates commuter rail services offered by Metrorail. In some places of Warner Beach, the railway line is only metres from the water's edge. After the floods of 2021 the Rail transport link from Warner Beach to Durban was out of service for 24 months. Currently, (November 2023) the railway link only goes as far a Winklespruit as the railway bridge across the iLovu River is still not repaired.

=== Roads ===
Warner Beach is situated along the R102 (Andrew Zondo Road), formerly known as Kingsway, the coastal route connecting to Doonside and Amanzimtoti in the north with Winklespruit and Umkomaas in the south.

Although the N2 freeway between Durban and Port Shepstone intersects Warner Beach, it does not offer direct access to the area. Access from the N2 can only be obtained via the Seadoone Road (in Doonside) or the R603 interchanges (in Winklespruit).
