= Craigieburn =

Craigieburn may refer to the following places:

- Craigieburn, Victoria, Australia
  - Craigieburn railway station
- Craigieburn, New Zealand
- Craigieburn, KwaZulu-Natal, South Africa
