= R624 road =

R624 road may refer to:

- R624 road (Ireland)
- R624 (South Africa)
