= Kevin Coghlan =

Kevin Coghlan may refer to:

- Kev Coghlan (born 1988), British motorcycle rider
- Kevin Coghlan (footballer) (1929–2002), Australian rules football player and commentator

== See also ==
- Coghlan (disambiguation)
