= Coghlan =

Coghlan may refer to:

== People ==
- Coghlan (surname)

== Places ==
- Coghlan, Buenos Aires, a barrio in Argentina named for John Coghlan
- Coghlan, Eastern Cape, a village in South Africa

== Other uses ==
- USS Coghlan (DD-326), a destroyer commissioned in 1921 and decommissioned in 1930
- USS Coghlan (DD-606), a destroyer commissioned in 1942 and decommissioned in 1947
- Coghlan's, a producer of camping goods
