= Dudley Theophilus =

South African cricketer (1911–1936)

Personal information
- Full name: Dudley Arthur Theophilus
- Born: 12 May 1911; Baroe, Cape Province, South Africa
- Died: 12 May 1936 (aged 25); Mowbray, Cape Town, Cape Province, South Africa
- Role: Wicket-keeper

Domestic team information
- Years: Team
- 1926–27 to 1933–34: Eastern Province

Career statistics
Competition	First-class
Matches	12
Runs scored	133
Batting average	8.31
100s/50s	0/0
Top score	29
Catches/stumpings	9/5
- Source: Cricinfo, 21 October 2018

Dudley Arthur Theophilus (12 May 1911 – 12 May 1936) holds the record as South Africa's youngest first-class cricketer.

Dudley Theophilus was born in Baroe, a small settlement in eastern Cape Province on the railway line between Klipplaat and Kleinpoort, about 150 kilometres inland from Port Elizabeth. Aged 15 years and 309 days, and while attending Grey High School in Port Elizabeth, he made his first-class debut for Eastern Province against Western Province in the 1926–27 Currie Cup. Keeping wickets, he conceded no byes in the match.

Theophilus played regularly for Eastern Province over the next few seasons, and also represented South African Schools against the touring MCC in 1927–28. He died on his 25th birthday.
