= Ilfracombe (disambiguation) =

There are several places with the name Ilfracombe:

- Ilfracombe, a small coastal town on the North Devon coast in the South West region of the United Kingdom
- Ilfracombe, Queensland, a town in the outback of Queensland, Australia
- Ilfracombe, KwaZulu-Natal, a coastal rural village on the South Coast of KwaZulu-Natal, South Africa
- an earlier name for the township of Beauty Point, Tasmania, Australia
