= M30 (Durban) =

Metropolitan route in eThekwini, South Africa

Metropolitan route M30

Route information
- Maintained by eThekwini Metropolitan Municipality
- Length: 31.6 km (19.6 mi)

Major junctions
- East end: R102 in Umlazi
- West end: R603 in Umbumbulu

Location
- Country: South Africa

Highway system
- Numbered routes of South Africa
← M29	→ M31

The M30 also named Griffiths Mxenge Highway (previously Mangosuthu Highway) is a metropolitan route in the eThekwini Metropolitan Municipality, South Africa linking the city of Durban with Umlazi and Umbumbulu, south-west of the city.

== Route ==
The M30 begins at the interchange with the R102 'South Coast Road' (to Durban and Prospecton) east of Umlazi Mega City and north of Reunion heading in a westerly direction. The M30 intersects with Phila Ndwandwe Road (to Isipingo) and the main access road to Umlazi Mega City before proceeding to traverse through the township of Umlazi.

In Umlazi V, the road bypasses the Prince Mshiyeni Memorial Hospital to the south, passing under the main access road to the hospital before intersecting with 'Sibusiso Mdakane Drive', the main road of Umlazi's Central Business District (CBD). It proceeds to pass the Mangosuthu University of Technology in Umlazi S, KwaMnyandu Shopping Centre and the King Zwelithini Stadium in Umlazi D and traverses through Umlazi R, N, M, L, J, K, KwaMgaga and Umlazi DD where the density transitions from peri-urban to rural. The M30 proceeds to leave Umlazi for the rural areas of Inwabi, Ezinyathi, Esidweni and Madundube before reaching Umbumbulu and ending at the intersection with the R603 'Sbu Mkhize Drive' (to Umlaas Road and Kingsburgh).
