= Doonside, KwaZulu-Natal =

Doonside
- Location within KwaZulu-Natal Location within South Africa
- Coordinates: 30.070°S 30.871°E
- Country: South Africa
- Province: KwaZulu-Natal
- Municipality: eThekwini
- Main Place: Kingsburgh

Area
  - Total: 1.06 km^{2} (0.41 sq mi)

Population (2011)
  - Total: 2,596
  - Density: 2,450/km^{2} (6,340/sq mi)

Racial makeup (2011)
  - Black African: 16.5%
  - Coloured: 2.3%
  - Indian/Asian: 4.8%
  - White: 76.0%
  - Other: 0.4%

First languages (2011)
  - English: 57.9%
  - Afrikaans: 34.3%
  - Zulu: 5.0%
  - Other: 2.7%
- Time zone: UTC+2 (SAST)
- Postal code (street): 4126
- PO box: 4135
- Area code: 031

Doonside is a small beachside resort suburb in Kingsburgh, some 30 km south-west of Durban in KwaZulu-Natal, South Africa on the South Coast.

At first the siding was called Middleton, after its builder, but to avoid confusion with Middleton in the Cape the name was changed in 1910 to Doonside, after a house called Lorna Doone which overlooked the siding.

== Geography ==
Doonside, together with its inland neighbour Doonheights, forms the northern part of Kingsburgh with both Doonside and Doonheights connected by Seadoone Road. It is bordered by eManzimtoti to the north, Warner Beach to the south, and Doonheights to the west, with the Little aManzimtoti River marking its southern edge.

== Retail ==
The sole shopping centre in Doonside, Kingsburgh Junction, recently opened on 23 July 2026 and is situated at the corner of Seadoone Road and Umfuleni Road, directly opposite the N2/Seadoone Road interchange. The new neighbourhood shopping centre developed by AJ Property Holdings is anchored by Superspar, Woolworths and Dis-Chem and serves Doonside, the greater Kingsburgh area as well as the lower parts of Amanzimtoti.

The shopping centre which was originally announced in March 2021 with an expected completion date of November 2023, had faced several development approvals, community objections and construction delays. It was then expected to open on 26 March 2026 and 25 June 2026, with a final set date of 23 July 2026.

== Transport ==
=== Rail ===
Doonside and its railway station lie on the railway line between Durban and Kelso, referred to as the South Coast Line, which is mainly operated by the commuter railway service of Metrorail.

=== Roads ===
Doonside lies alongside the N2 freeway, with direct access provided by the off-ramps at Seadoone Road. The R102 (Andrew Zondo Road) forms the suburb’s primary local route, running parallel to the coastline and connects it to Amanzimtoti, Warner Beach and Winklespruit.
