= Kingsburgh Junction =

Shopping centre in Kingsburgh, South Africa

- Interactive map of the Kingsburgh Junction area

General information
- Location: Doonside, Kingsburgh, South Africa, Corner of Seadoone and Umfuleni Roads
- Coordinates: 30.0685°S 30.8704°E
- Construction started: September 2023
- Opening: 23 July 2026
- Cost: R114.5 million
- Owner: AJ Property Holdings

Technical details
- Floor count: 1
- Floor area: 10 000

Design and construction
- Architecture firm: BC Architects
- Main contractor: GVK-Siya Zama

Other information
- Number of stores: 32

Kingsburgh Junction is a shopping centre located in Kingsburgh on the South Coast of KwaZulu-Natal, South Africa, serving both coastal towns of Kingsburgh and eManzimtoti located south of Durban.

Kingsburgh Junction officially opened on 23 July 2026, and was initially announced in 2021. The development has seen its opening date shift several times; it was originally slated for November 2023, later postponed to October 2024, 26 March 2026, 25 June 2026 and finally, 23 July 2026.

== Location ==
Kingsburgh Junction is situated on the suburb of Doonside on the northern boundary of Kingsburgh with eManzimtoti. The site of the shopping centre is located on the corner of Seadoone Road and Umfuleni Road, directly adjacent to the N2/Seadoone Road interchange (Exit 137).

The site was selected to provide retail convenience for the residents of the Kingsburgh suburbs of Doonside, Doon Heights, Shulton Park, Illovo Glen as well as the southern portions of eManzimtoti.

== Tenants ==
Anchor tenants include Superspar (including Tops @ Spar and Vida e Caffè), Woolworths and Dis-Chem. Other well-known national retailers that complement the anchor tenants include Pep, Pep Home, Ackermans, KFC (Drive-Thru), Milky Lane and Pedro's.
