= Amandasig =

- Location within Gauteng Location within South Africa
- Coordinates: 25°40′43″S 28°06′19″E
- Country: South Africa
- Province: Gauteng
- Municipality: City of Tshwane
- Main Place: Akasia

Area
  - Total: 4.60 km^{2} (1.78 sq mi)

Population (2011)
  - Total: 3,738
  - Density: 813/km^{2} (2,100/sq mi)

Racial makeup (2011)
  - Black African: 60.9%
  - Coloured: 1.5%
  - Indian/Asian: 1.8%
  - White: 34.4%
  - Other: 1.4%

First languages (2011)
  - Tswana/N./S. Sotho: 35.9%
  - Afrikaans: 31.3%
  - English: 15.9%
  - Zulu: 4.6%
  - Other: 12.3%
- Time zone: UTC+2 (SAST)
- Postal code (street): 0182
- PO box: 0118
- Area code: 012

Amandasig is a suburb of Akasia in Gauteng, South Africa. It is situated to the north west of the Pretoria CBD, on the slopes of the Magaliesberg.

It used to be a predominantly Afrikaans speaking suburb for many young white residents, but the demography has changed since the end of apartheid in 1994. During Apartheid, Amandasig was a "Whites Only" area, as determined by the government of the time.
