= Theresapark =

- Location within Gauteng Location within South Africa
- Coordinates: 25°40′26″S 28°08′23″E
- Country: South Africa
- Province: Gauteng
- Municipality: City of Tshwane
- Main Place: Akasia

Area
  - Total: 4.64 km^{2} (1.79 sq mi)

Population (2011)
  - Total: 7,746
  - Density: 1,670/km^{2} (4,320/sq mi)

Racial makeup (2011)
  - Black African: 44.2%
  - Coloured: 1.2%
  - Indian/Asian: 1.0%
  - White: 53.2%
  - Other: 0.4%

First languages (2011)
  - Afrikaans: 49.7%
  - Tswana/Sotho: 27%
  - English: 9.4%
  - Zulu: 3.7%
  - Other: 10.2%
- Time zone: UTC+2 (SAST)
- Postal code (street): 0182
- PO box: 0155
- Area code: 012

Theresapark is a suburb of Akasia in Gauteng, South Africa. It is situated to the north west of the Pretoria CBD, facing the slopes of the Magaliesberg.

It used to be a predominantly Afrikaans speaking suburb for many young white residents, but the demography has changed since the end of apartheid in 1994.
