= Karenpark =

- Location within Gauteng Location within South Africa
- Coordinates: 25°39′46″S 28°06′37″E
- Country: South Africa
- Province: Gauteng
- Municipality: City of Tshwane
- Main Place: Akasia

Area
  - Total: 2.95 km^{2} (1.14 sq mi)

Population (2011)
  - Total: 8,447
  - Density: 2,860/km^{2} (7,420/sq mi)

Racial makeup (2011)
  - Black African: 85.1%
  - Coloured: 1.1%
  - Indian/Asian: 1.6%
  - White: 11.9%
  - Other: 0.4%

First languages (2011)
  - Tswana/N/S. Sotho: 48.8%
  - Afrikaans: 11.6%
  - English: 10.7%
  - Zulu: 8.6%
  - Other: 10.2%
- Time zone: UTC+2 (SAST)
- Postal code (street): 0182
- PO box: 0118

Karenpark is a suburb of Akasia in Gauteng, South Africa. It is situated to the north west of the Pretoria CBD and at the south western corner of Akasia.

It used to be a predominantly Afrikaans speaking suburb for many young white residents, but the demography has changed since the end of apartheid in 1994.
