= Bakerville =

- Location within North West (South African province) Location within South Africa
- Coordinates: 25.983°S 26.083°E
- Country: South Africa
- Province: North West
- District: Ngaka Modiri Molema
- Municipality: Ditsobotla

Area
  - Total: 1.40 km^{2} (0.54 sq mi)

Population (2011)
  - Total: 2,441
  - Density: 1,740/km^{2} (4,520/sq mi)

Racial makeup (2011)
  - Black African: 94.1%
  - Coloured: 5.0%
  - Indian/Asian: 0.3%
  - Other: 0.6%

First languages (2011)
  - Tswana: 91.9%
  - English: 2.0%
  - Afrikaans: 1.8%
  - Sotho: 1.5%
  - Other: 2.8%
- Time zone: UTC+2 (SAST)
- Postal code (street): 2742
- PO box: 2742

Bakerville is a town in Ditsobotla Local Municipality in the North West province of South Africa.

Located approximately 20 km north of Lichtenburg, it is a world-renowned diamond diggings, covering an area of more or less 35 km from east to west. Bakerville is on the Zeerust Road.

== History ==
Bakerville, or "Bakers" as it was known it the time, it is only one of several "Diggers Towns", developed in Wild West style. Bakerville was the biggest and most famous of the towns.

By 1928 the rush was over. Today a smattering of "bitter-einders" remain, optimists all, still digging through tonnes of gravel heaps in the never-ending search for the 'Big One'.

Then came one of the most exciting times in the century. By the end of 1927 there were proclamations on eight farms. In a second rush in 1945, production on the diggings was on the same scale as in 1925; one-hundred-and-four diggings on one farm were proclaimed.

It all started two years earlier, in 1924, when postmaster's son Kosie Voorendyk and a couple of la homers were digging a cattle dip. Kosie, in great excitement picked up the stone and took it to the local science teacher, a Mr Bosman, to put the stone through an acid test. It was a beautiful stone of 3 carats (600 mg). Immediately the Voorendyks contracted PR Hager, the state geologist and prospector. But he was not impressed. He paid a short visit to the farm in 1925 and briefly looked around. His reaction: "My boy, there are no diamonds on this farm. A bird must have dropped it here."

PR Hager moved on to another find at Manana, a farm next to Lichtenburg, and went prospecting. The first proclamation of a digging was made there. He then moved off to a farm, Hangklip, near Elandsputte. At least he thought he did. Unknowingly he got lost and started prospecting Elandsputte itself. Within days he found a stunning 6 carats (1.2 g) stone. His first wash delivered 21 diamonds, the next, 361. The diggings were proclaimed in February 1926, the first one where thousands of diggers took part.

Then came professional diggers, fortune seekers and the adventurers.

A city of shacks rose within a year. The population of 150,000 was seven times bigger than that of Lichtenburg today. Diamond digger Bakers, called after the owner Albert Baker, and later known as Bakerville, was the main town. Houses and shacks stood wall-to-wall for several kilometres. Some 250 diamond buyers plied their trade along with dining houses, a cinema, a merry-go-round and about 60 cafes, shops, barbers, butcheries and other businesses. The Bakerville school, one of 17 on the diggings, had 15 classrooms. MC Botha, later Minister of Bantu Affairs in the Apartheid government, was at this school.

A very large quantity of diamonds was found just beneath the topsoil. In one week, diggers found diamonds worth R10 million in today's terms.

Up until 1927 an astounding amount of diamonds were pulled out of the ground − 70% of the former Transvaal's alluvial production at the time.

From 1928, the economic position of the diggers weakened dramatically because of worked out gravels, a fall in diamond prices and the onset of the Depression. Inevitably, the diggers drifted away and slowly calm returned to the district.

In the early 1980s, interest in the area was renewed with the release of a government report which indicated that undiscovered diamond-ferous gravels may occur beneath the sand cover within sinkholes and channels outside of the known major runs, which are located on eight farms. This period saw the arrival of foreign and local mining and exploration companies to the area.
