= Winklespruit =

- Location within KwaZulu-Natal Location within South Africa
- Coordinates: 30°06′S 30°51′E
- Country: South Africa
- Province: KwaZulu-Natal
- Municipality: eThekwini
- Main Place: Kingsburgh

Area
  - Total: 2.03 km^{2} (0.78 sq mi)
- Elevation: 16 m (52 ft)

Population (2011)
  - Total: 1,689
  - Density: 832/km^{2} (2,150/sq mi)

Racial makeup (2011)
  - Black African: 21.0%
  - Coloured: 3.0%
  - Indian/Asian: 3.1%
  - White: 72.7%
  - Other: 0.1%

First languages (2011)
  - English: 51.1%
  - Afrikaans: 37.3%
  - Zulu: 9.5%
  - Xhosa: 1.1%
  - Other: 1.0%
- Time zone: UTC+2 (SAST)
- Postal code (street): 4145
- PO box: 4126
- Area code: 031

Winklespruit is a small seaside resort on the South Coast of KwaZulu-Natal in South Africa and now forms part of the coastal town of Kingsburgh and the eThekwini Metropolitan Municipality, the Greater Durban metropolitan area.

== History ==
On 10 May 1875 the schooner Tonga which was carrying wares for Durban was wrecked here. The sailors not wanting the cargo to go to waste set up a store on the river bank and sold the water damaged goods. The store was known by the Afrikaans as winkel (shop).

== Geography ==
Situated just north of the iLovu River, Winklespruit is part of the Sapphire Coast also known as the Upper South Coast. It is bounded by the Indian Ocean to the east, Warner Beach to the north, St Winifreds and Astra Park to the north-west and Illovo Beach to the south.

== Retail ==
Winklespruit functions as the main shopping node for Kingsburgh residents and contains two of the town's three shopping centres, including Kingsburgh Centre and DSM Mall.

== Transport ==
Winklespruit is located on the junction of the R102 and R603 regional routes. The R102 is the main road through Winklespruit connecting north to Warner Beach and Amanzimtoti as Andrew Zondo Road (previously named Kingsway) and south to Illovo Beach and Umkomaas as Winklespruit Road, while the R603 connects Winklespruit with Umbumbulu to the north-west as Sbu Mkhize Drive and provides access to the N2 freeway (to Port Shepstone and Durban).
