= Karridene =

- Location within KwaZulu-Natal Location within South Africa
- Coordinates: 30°08′S 30°50′E
- Country: South Africa
- Province: KwaZulu-Natal
- Municipality: eThekwini
- Main Place: Kingsburgh

Area
  - Total: 0.78 km^{2} (0.30 sq mi)

Population (2011)
  - Total: 73
  - Density: 94/km^{2} (240/sq mi)

Racial makeup (2011)
  - Black African: 19.2%
  - Coloured: 11.0%
  - Indian/Asian: 13.7%
  - White: 56.2%

First languages (2011)
  - Zulu: 56.2%
  - English: 31.2%
  - Afrikaans: 12.5%
- Time zone: UTC+2 (SAST)
- Postal code (street): 4126

Karridene is a small resort in KwaZulu-Natal, South Africa. It is now part of eThekwini. Seaside resort at the mouth of the Umzimbaza River, 37 km south-west of Durban, between Illovo Beach and Umkomaas.

== History ==
Named after Lieutenant-Colonel Walter Karri-Davis, a mining magnate and owner of the ground where it was laid out.

== See also ==
- Black December
