= Empisini Nature Reserve =

Nature reserve in South Africa

Coordinates: 30°12′02″S 30°47′14″E

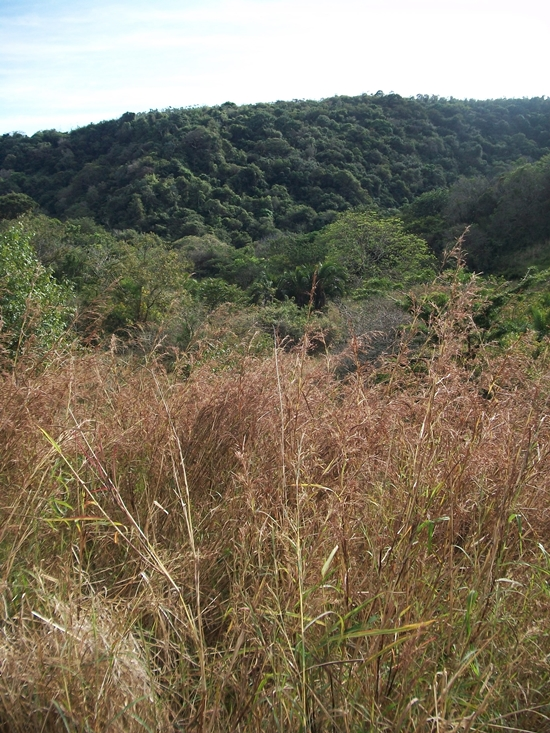
Grassland and forest in Empisini Nature Reserve

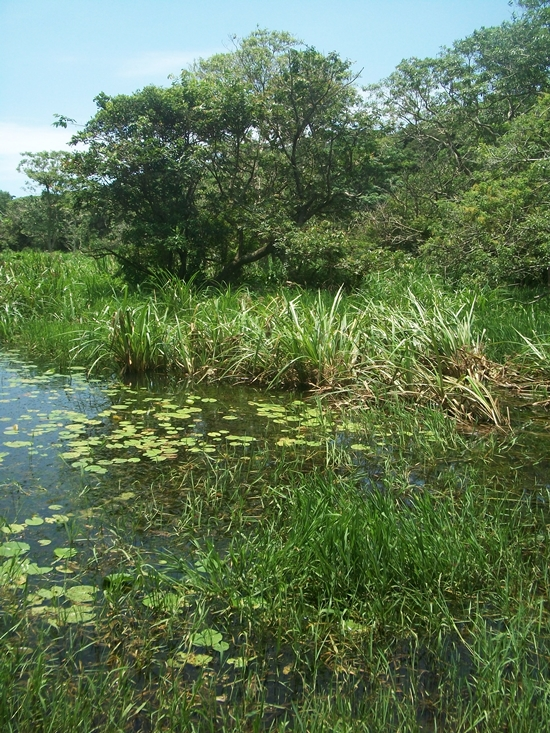
Wetland around the dam in Empisini Nature Reserve

Empisini Nature Reserve was established in 1973 and is situated in Umkomaas, KwaZulu-Natal, South Africa. The reserve is approximately 60 ha in extent and is owned by the borough of uMkhomanzi which has been incorporated into the eThekwini municipality. Empisini is managed jointly by eThekwini and the Umkomaas centre of the Wildlife and Environment Society of South Africa. Empisini takes its name from a perennial stream which flows through it, and means "Place of the Hyena" in isiZulu. The reserve consists of coastal forest, wetlands, grassy slopes and a dam. Infrastructure consists of hiking trails, demarcated picnic sites, overnight cabins, and a tree house.

== Wildlife ==
=== Mammals ===
Monkey, mongoose, blue duiker, bushbuck, otter, bushpig and several species of bats.

=== Birds ===
At least 201 species of birds have been recorded at Empisini including: African fish-eagle (Haliaeetus vocifer), African crowned eagle (Stephanoaetus coronatus), Wahlberg's eagle (Aquila wahlbergi), black-chested snake-eagle (Circaetus pectoralis), spur-winged goose (Plectropterus gambensis), African black duck (Anas sparsa), tambourine dove (Turtur tympanistria), emerald-spotted wood-dove (Turtur chalcospilos), lemon dove (Aplopelia larvata), purple-crested turaco (Gallirex porphyreolophus), Knysna turaco (Tauraco corythaix), green malkoha (Ceuthmochares aereus), African wood-owl (Strix woodfordii), African palm-swift (Cypsiurus parvus), Narina trogon (Apaloderma narina), giant kingfisher (Megaceryle maximus), African pygmy-kingfisher (Ispidina picta), trumpeter hornbill (Bycanistes bucinator), olive woodpecker (Dendropicos griseocephalus), red-throated wryneck (Jynx ruficollis), spotted ground-thrush (Zoothera guttata), mountain wagtail (Motacilla clara), dark-backed weaver (Ploceus bicolor), magpie mannikin (Spermestes fringilloides), red-backed mannikin (Spermestes bicolor), green twinspot (Mandingoa nitidula) and forest canary (Crithagra scotops).

=== Butterflies ===
Among the butterflies recorded in Empisini are: D'Urban's woolly legs (Lachnocnema durbani), dark grass blue (Zizina otis antanossa), white-tipped blue (Eicochrysops hippocrates), Gaika blue (Zizula hylax), common zebra blue (Leptotes pirithous), Natal babul blue (Azanus natalensis), brown pansy (Junonia natalica), yellow pansy (Junonia hierta), Natal acraea (Acraea natalica), African veined white (Belenois gidica), clouded forester (Tagiades flesus), Macken's dart (Acleros mackenii) and common Hottentot (Gegenes niso).

=== Trees ===
Trees include: cheesewood (Pittosporum viridiflorum), false white stinkwood (Celtis gomphophylla) and broad-leafed quince (Cryptocarya latifolia).
