= R603 (South Africa) =

Regional route in South Africa

Regional route R603

Route information
- Length: 84 km (52 mi)

Major junctions
- North-west end: N3 / R103 at Umlaas Road near Camperdown
- R624 near Mpumalanga; N2 in Kingsburgh
- South-east end: R102 in Kingsburgh

Location
- Country: South Africa
- Towns: Kingsburgh, Umbumbulu

Highway system
- Numbered routes of South Africa
← R602	→ R612

The R603 is a Regional Route in KwaZulu-Natal, South Africa connecting Kingsburgh on the South Coast with Umlaas Road, between Pietermaritzburg and Durban, via Umbumbulu.

== Route ==
Its north-western terminus is the N3 in Umlaas Road near Camperdown, KwaZulu-Natal. It initially heads south, crossing the R103. It then passes just west of Mpumalanga and after 15 kilometres, it intersects with the R624's eastern terminus, and heads south-east. It proceeds to meet the western terminus of the M30 at Umbumbulu. It proceeds south-east to Kingsburgh on the South Coast, where it crosses the N2 highway and ends just after at a junction with the R102 in the coastal suburb of Winklespruit, Kingsburgh.
