= The Orchards, Gauteng =

The Orchards
- Location within Gauteng Location within South Africa
- Coordinates: 25°38′49″S 28°05′42″E
- Country: South Africa
- Province: Gauteng
- Municipality: City of Tshwane
- Main Place: Akasia

Area
  - Total: 3.71 km^{2} (1.43 sq mi)

Population (2011)
  - Total: 7,778
  - Density: 2,100/km^{2} (5,430/sq mi)

Racial makeup (2011)
  - Black African: 82.8%
  - Coloured: 1.2%
  - Indian/Asian: 0.7%
  - White: 14.9%
  - Other: 0.4%

First languages (2011)
  - Tswana/N/S. Sotho: 54.4%
  - Afrikaans: 15.8%
  - Zulu: 7.7%
  - English: 5.7%
  - Other: 16.4%
- Time zone: UTC+2 (SAST)
- Postal code (street): 0182
- PO box: 0201

The Orchards is a suburb of Akasia in Gauteng, South Africa. It is situated to the north west of the Pretoria CBD and borders Rosslyn on its north western corner.
