= Aan de Doorns =

- Interactive map of Aan de Doorns
- Coordinates: 33°41′58″S 19°29′29″E
- Country: South Africa
- Province: Western Cape
- Website: aandedoorns.co.za

Aan de Doorns is a small settlement on the Nuy River, about 7 km south east of Worcester in the Western Cape, South Africa.

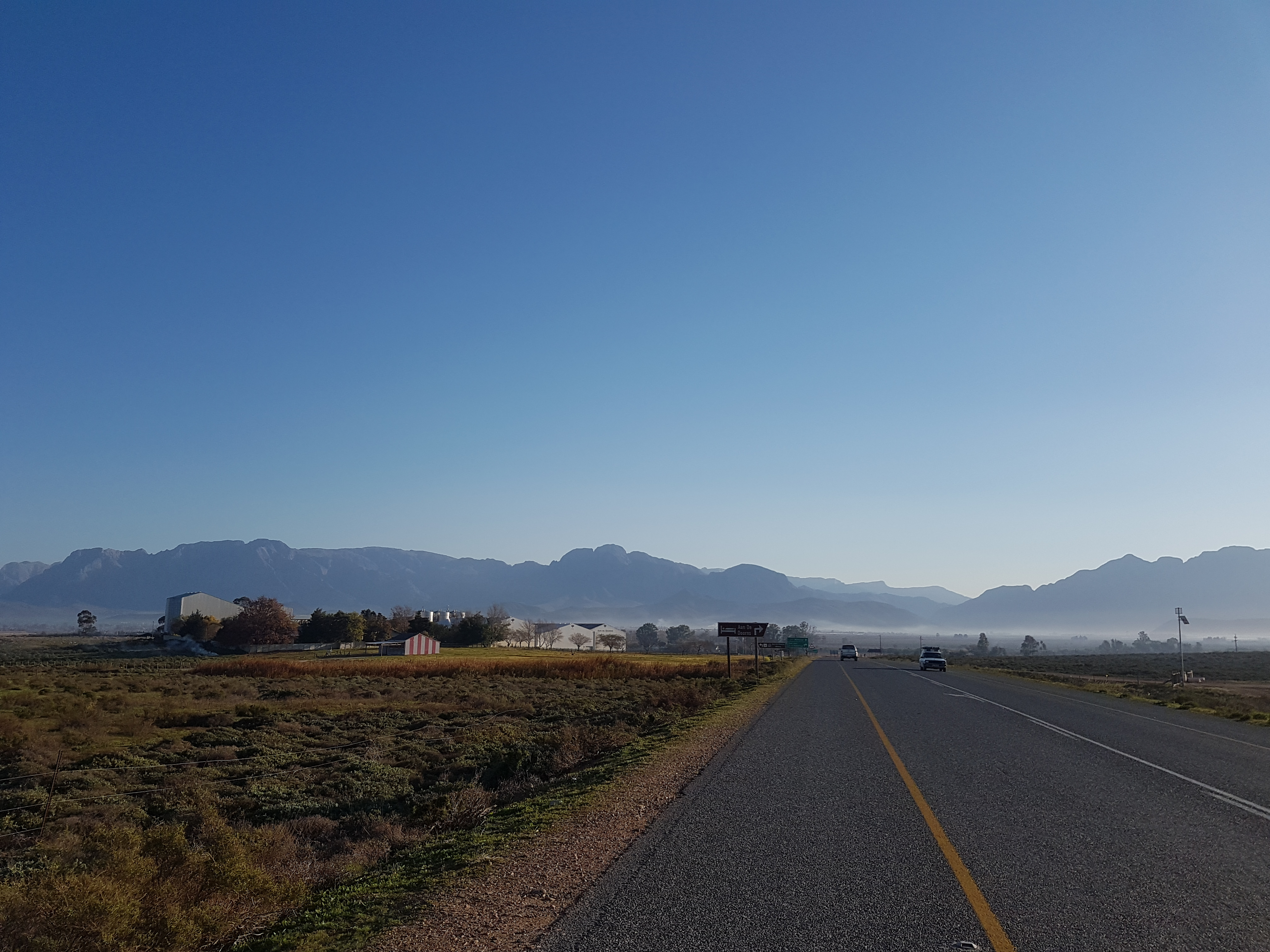
Aan de Doorns winery

The name is of Dutch origin and literally mean "at the thorns".
