= Coghlan's =

Canadian producer of camping goods and accessories

- Industry: Camping
- Founded: 1959
- Founder: Norm Coghlan
- Headquarters: Winnipeg, Manitoba
- Key people: Rob Coghlan (CEO); Jeff Stevens (President); Jill Stevens (COO)
- Website: coghlans.com

Coghlan's is a major Canadian producer of camping goods and accessories. Their products can be found in major outdoor retail outlets such as REI and Cabela's in the United States and Canadian Tire and Mountain Equipment Company in Canada.

== History ==
Coghlan's was founded in Winnipeg, Manitoba, in 1959 as Coghlan's Gas Appliances. The firm's first product was the Camp Stove Toaster.

Once, Norm Coghlan (1927-2013) also sold camping equipment in his store on the side. When campers began bringing their camp stoves and lanterns seeking parts and repairs, he gradually expanded his product line. Operations expanded to include distribution when Coghlan's began selling camp stove toasters. Since then, it has grown to over 450 products and is the largest producer of camping accessories in Canada and the United States. It is still a family-owned company.

In 2015, Coghlan's acquired Bellingham, Washington based company McNett, which sells products for repairing and maintaining outdoor equipment. The products are sold under the name GearAid.

== See also ==
- Coleman Company
