= R624 (South Africa) =

Regional route in South Africa

Regional route R624

Location
- Country: South Africa

Highway system
- Numbered routes of South Africa
← R622	→ R700

The R624 is a Regional Route in South Africa.

== Route ==
Its western terminus is the R56 near Richmond. It runs east to link up with the R603 south of Mpumalanga.
