= Ahrens, KwaZulu-Natal =

Coordinates: 29°04′S 30°45′E

Ahrens is a railway stop in KwaZulu-Natal, South Africa, 16 km west of Greytown, en route to Kranskop.

The railway stop is named after Wilhelm Ahrens, from 1880 to 1906 headmaster of the German school at Hermannsburg, 4 km northeast from here.
