= Elandsputte cattle dip =

Provincial heritage site in South Africa

The Elandsputte cattle dip is a provincial heritage site in Lichtenburg in the North West province of South Africa.

In 1980 it was described in the Government Gazette as

In December 1924, during the construction of this cattle-dip, Mr J. A. Voorendyk discovered a diamond which led to the further discovery of diamonds on Elandsputte (a portion of Uitgevonden) and the eventual spectacular "diamond rushes" on Elandsputte in 1926 and Grasfontein in 1927. In 1927 diamond production on the Lichtenburg diggings reached a peak when 2 100 861 carats [420.1722 kg] were produced, which nearly resulted in the collapse of South Africa's diamond market.
