= Ilfracombe, KwaZulu-Natal =

Ilfracombe
- Location within KwaZulu-Natal Location within South Africa Location within Africa
- Coordinates: 30°11′00″S 30°47′00″E
- Country: South Africa
- Province: KwaZulu-Natal
- Municipality: eThekwini

Area
  - Total: 2.74 km^{2} (1.06 sq mi)

Population (2011)
  - Total: 46
  - Density: 17/km^{2} (43/sq mi)

Racial makeup (2011)
  - Black African: 86.9%
  - Indian/Asian: 2.2%
  - White: 10.9%

First languages (2011)
  - Zulu: 71.7%
  - English: 23.9%
  - Sotho: 4.4%
- Time zone: UTC+2 (SAST)
- PO box: 4170
- Area code: 039

Ilfracombe is a coastal rural community on the South Coast of KwaZulu-Natal, South Africa, which forms part of the eThekwini Metropolitan Municipality.

== Geography ==
Ilfracombe is located approximately 45 km south of Durban and is accessible by rail and by roads, including the N2 freeway (to Durban and Port Shepstone) and the coastal R102 (to eMkhomazi and Umgababa). It lies north of eMkhomazi, on the opposite side of the uMkhomazi River in the south and Umgababa in the north. Today, Ilfracombe is known as an extension or suburb of eMkhomazi.
