= Baroe =

Baroe is a settlement in Sarah Baartman District Municipality, Eastern Cape, South Africa. It is the hometown of cricketer Dudley Theophilus.
