= Craigieburn, KwaZulu-Natal =

Township in KwaZulu-Natal, South Africa

Craigieburn
- Location within KwaZulu-Natal Location within South Africa
- Coordinates: 30.192°S 30.763°E
- Country: South Africa
- Province: KwaZulu-Natal
- Municipality: eThekwini

Area
  - Total: 12.7 km^{2} (4.9 sq mi)

Population (2011)
  - Total: 7,574
  - Density: 596/km^{2} (1,540/sq mi)

Racial makeup (2011)
  - Black African: 28.1%
  - Coloured: 2.2%
  - Indian/Asian: 68.6%
  - White: 0.7%
  - Other: 0.4%

First languages (2011)
  - English: 72.5%
  - Zulu: 19.4%
  - Xhosa: 3.7%
  - Ndebele: 1.0%
  - Other: 3.3%
- Time zone: UTC+2 (SAST)
- Postal code (street): 4170
- PO box: 4170
- Area code: 039

Craigieburn is a small town located on the South Coast of KwaZulu-Natal, South Africa and 53 km (33 mi) south-west of Durban.

== History ==
Originally a farm owned by a Mr. John Mackenzie, Craigieburn was site of the first sugar cane plantation south of Isipingo.

== Economy ==
Craigieburn is characterised by limited retail amenities with a few hardware and wholesale outlets in the town centre and the sole and main shopping centre near the town centre anchored by Superspar. As a result of the limited resources and infrastructure in Craigieburn, residents mostly depend on the neighbouring town of Umkomaas or slightly further to Scottburgh for water and sanitation, health, police, and other services.

== Geography ==
Craigieburn lies just west and 10 km inland from the coastal town of Umkomaas (now renamed to eMkhomazi) on the gentle rolling hills of the South Coast and just south of the uMkhomazi River. Neighbouring communities include Magabeni to the north, Umkomaas to the east, Amahlongwa to the south and the adjoining suburb of Roseneath to the north-west.

Craigieburn comprises two distinct areas- Craigieburn proper and Naidooville. Naidooville is located separately from the main town of Craigieburn and is situated adjacent the N2. Craigieburn, along with Roseneath, Clansthal, Magabeni and Ilfracombe form part of the functional area of Umkomaas.

== Education ==
Schools in Craigieburn include:

- Naidoo Memorial Primary School
- Naidooville Primary School
- Umkomaas Drift Primary School
- Umkomaas Secondary School

== Transport ==
Craigieburn is located just off the N2 highway, which runs north-south from Durban to Port Shepstone and on the junction of Craigieburn Drive (to Umkomaas) and the P197-3 (to Umzinto and Magabeni). The main road through the town centre of Craigieburn is Calendula Avenue which runs between Craigieburn Drive and the P197-3.

== Places of worship ==
=== Churches ===
- Craigieburn Methodist Church
- Ebenezer Evangelical Church

=== Temples ===
- Cragieburn Ashram
- Umkomaas Siva Soobramoniar Temple
- Umkomaas Siva Subramanian Temple
