= Kleinpoort =

- Village Station
- Location within South Africa
- Coordinates: 33.3302772°S 24.8678908°E
- Country: South Africa
- Province: Eastern Cape

Kleinpoort is a small village station in the Eastern Cape province of South Africa.
