= Ga-Motlagomo =

- Coordinates: 23°26′57″S 29°2′22″E
- Country: South Africa
- Province: Limpopo
- District: Capricorn

Area
  - Total: 2.93 km^{2} (1.13 sq mi)

Population
  - Total: 512
  - Density: 170/km^{2} (450/sq mi)

Ga-Motlagomo is a settlement in Limpopo, South Africa. According to the 2011 census, its population is 512, all of whom are Black Africans. 97.26% of its inhabitants, or all but 15, speak Sepedi as their first language. Its name is also spelled Ga-Motlakgomo or simply Motlakgomo.
