= Boston, KwaZulu-Natal =

Boston
- Location within KwaZulu-Natal Location within South Africa
- Coordinates: 29°41′S 30°4′E
- Country: South Africa
- Province: KwaZulu-Natal
- District: uMgungundlovu
- Municipality: Impendle
- Time zone: UTC+2 (SAST)
- PO box: 3211
- Area code: 033

Boston is a small town situated in the uMkhomazi and Elands River valley of KwaZulu-Natal, South Africa. It is a drive of 320 miles (510 km) from Johannesberg.

The Boston rain frog (Breviceps batrachophiliorum) was discovered here in 2023.
