= Chantelle, Pretoria =

Chantelle
- Location within Gauteng Location within South Africa
- Coordinates: 25°39′45″S 28°05′30″E
- Country: South Africa
- Province: Gauteng
- Municipality: City of Tshwane
- Main Place: Akasia

Area
  - Total: 2.06 km^{2} (0.80 sq mi)

Population (2011)
  - Total: 4,461
  - Density: 2,170/km^{2} (5,610/sq mi)

Racial makeup (2011)
  - Black African: 89.3%
  - Coloured: 1.0%
  - Indian/Asian: 0.1%
  - White: 9.2%
  - Other: 0.4%

First languages (2011)
  - Tswana: 33.4%
  - Northern Sotho: 13.2%
  - English: 11.7%
  - Afrikaans: 10.0%
  - Other: 31.6%
- Time zone: UTC+2 (SAST)
- Postal code (street): 0182
- PO box: 0201

Chantelle is a suburb of Akasia in Gauteng, South Africa. It is situated to the north west of Pretoria and in the south western corner of Akasia.

It used to be a predominantly Afrikaans speaking suburb for many young white residents, but the demography has changed since the end of apartheid in 1994.
