= Akasia =

Group of suburbs in Gauteng, South Africa

- Location within Gauteng Location within South Africa Location within Africa
- Coordinates: 25.6470°S 28.0998°E
- Country: South Africa
- Province: Gauteng
- Municipality: City of Tshwane

Area
  - Total: 80.84 km^{2} (31.21 sq mi)

Population (2011)
  - Total: 59,455
  - Density: 735.5/km^{2} (1,905/sq mi)

Racial makeup (2011)
  - Black African: 73.7%
  - Coloured: 1.1%
  - Indian/Asian: 0.8%
  - White: 23.9%
  - Other: 0.4%

First languages (2011)
  - Tswana: 23.8%
  - Afrikaans: 23.3%
  - Northern Sotho: 12.4%
  - English: 9.9%
  - Other: 30.6%
- Time zone: UTC+2 (SAST)
- Postal code (street): 0601

Akasia is a complex of suburbs north of Pretoria, part of the City of Tshwane Metropolitan Municipality. Formerly an independent municipality, the area surrounding Akasia is largely semi-rural and Akasia itself is built on former agricultural holdings.

== History ==
The first suburb to be built in Akasia is The Orchards. The Orchards was established as a residential township in 1904 and an old Dutch-Reformed church was in the center of the neighborhood. As the city of Pretoria grew in light of industrial expansion in the 1960s more houses were constructed in the northern semi-rural holdings today known as Akasia.

The turning point in the urban development of Akasia was the establishment of the Rosslyn industrial complex in the early 1970s. Rosslyn became a significant industrial complex, housing large industrial corporations such as Nampak, BMW, South African Breweries and Nissan. With the growth of the manufacturing complex came a need for a large skilled and semi-skilled workforce nearby and by the late 1970s the small agricultural holdings in the area were being purchased and transformed into residential offerings with tree lined streets and green parks. The town attained municipal status in 1984, before losing it as part of the post-apartheid reorganisation of local governments, and being incorporated into the City of Tshwane Metropolitan Municipality.

With a success in the sale of housing in The Orchards, there was a plan to build more similar suburban style houses for the large population of artisans and technicians. Soon suburbs such as Karenpark, Amandasig, Theresapark, Ninapark, Clarina, Hesteapark, Flourana, and Chantelle were built.

== Demographics ==
The area's population grew from a mere 400 in the 1950s to over 60,000 in the 2011 census. The people of Akasia were up until the early 1990s mainly white Afrikaans-speaking people. Since the advent of democracy in South Africa, the area has transformed to represent the demographics of the greater area Pretoria North. A development that has arisen in the social construct of the area is the influx of people from other parts of the African continent bringing with them a new cultural flavor to the area. Small Somali shops and Congolese hairdressers have given the largely culturally monogamous area a new traditional dynamic. The relationship between the African migrants and local South Africans in the Akasia area is relatively good as the population in Akasia is well educated and levels of unemployment are low.

With an increase in population came an increase in the demand for other support services such as schools, health care facilities, municipal offices, filling stations, shopping and entertainment centers and religious institutions. As a result of these developments, Akasia has changed its character as a dormitory town and is developing a vibe of a more cosmopolitan city of its own.

== Economy ==
The area has a growing young population of graduate professionals who are flocking to the cosmopolitan complexes in the Karen Park and Theresapark areas, which brings with it more need for business development and expansion in numerous industries.

Key features include the Wonder Park Shopping Centre, the Winternest train station and drivers testing station, schools such as Hoёrskool Akasia, Hoёrskool Gerrit-Maritz, Laerskool Theresapark, Laerskool Akasia, Amandasig Secondary School and Charlton Vos College of Education.
