= Umbumbulu =

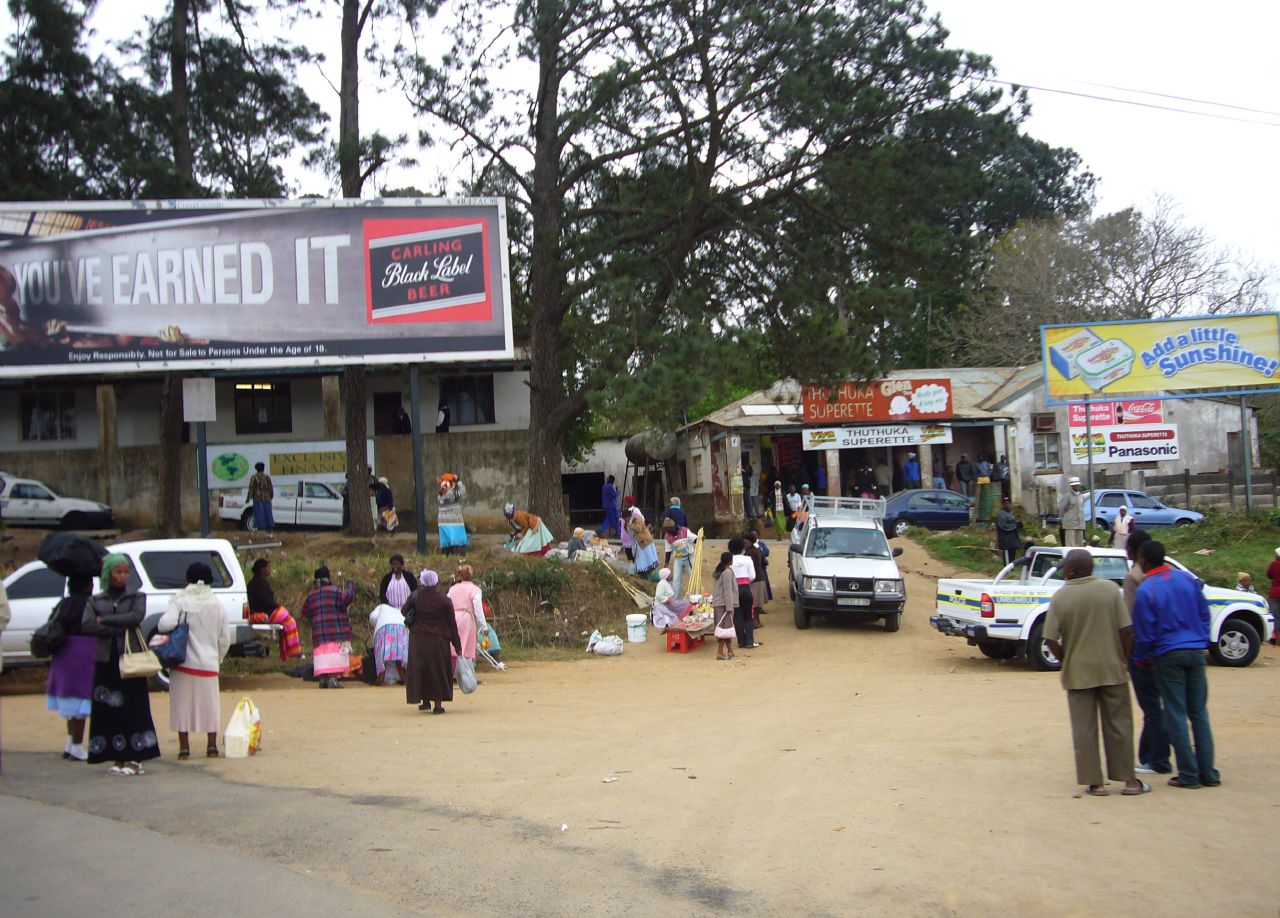
- Village center

- Location within KwaZulu-Natal Location within South Africa
- Coordinates: 29.984°S 30.702°E
- Country: South Africa
- Province: KwaZulu-Natal
- Municipality: eThekwini

Area
  - Total: 23.2 km^{2} (9.0 sq mi)

Population (2011)
  - Total: 2,684
  - Density: 116/km^{2} (300/sq mi)

Racial makeup (2011)
  - Black African: 98.7%
  - Coloured: 0.07%
  - Indian/Asian: 0.1%
  - White: 0.5%
  - Other: 0.5%

First languages (2011)
  - Zulu: 93.4%
  - English: 1.6%
  - Other: 5%
- Time zone: UTC+2 (SAST)
- PO box: 4105
- Area code: 031

Umbumbulu is a town in the eThekwini Metropolitan Municipality in the KwaZulu-Natal province of South Africa.

The township lies near the junction of the M30 (to Umlazi) and R603 (to Kingsburgh and Umlaas Road) about 45 km south-west of Durban and 19 km from the Indian Ocean. Derived from Zulu, the name is said to mean place of the round knoll. Umbumbulu is a rural area, bordered by Madundube on the north-east, and the farming community of Mid-Illovo on the south. In the 1970s and 1980s it was a scene of a local conflict, which saw hundreds murdered, and thousands dislocated. It has since become a picture of serene rural living.

The main river running through Umbumbulu is the Ntinyane River, and it is infamous as the site where a clergyman was swept away by the floods in the 1980s, his body never retrieved to this day.
