= Coghlan, South Africa =

Coghlan
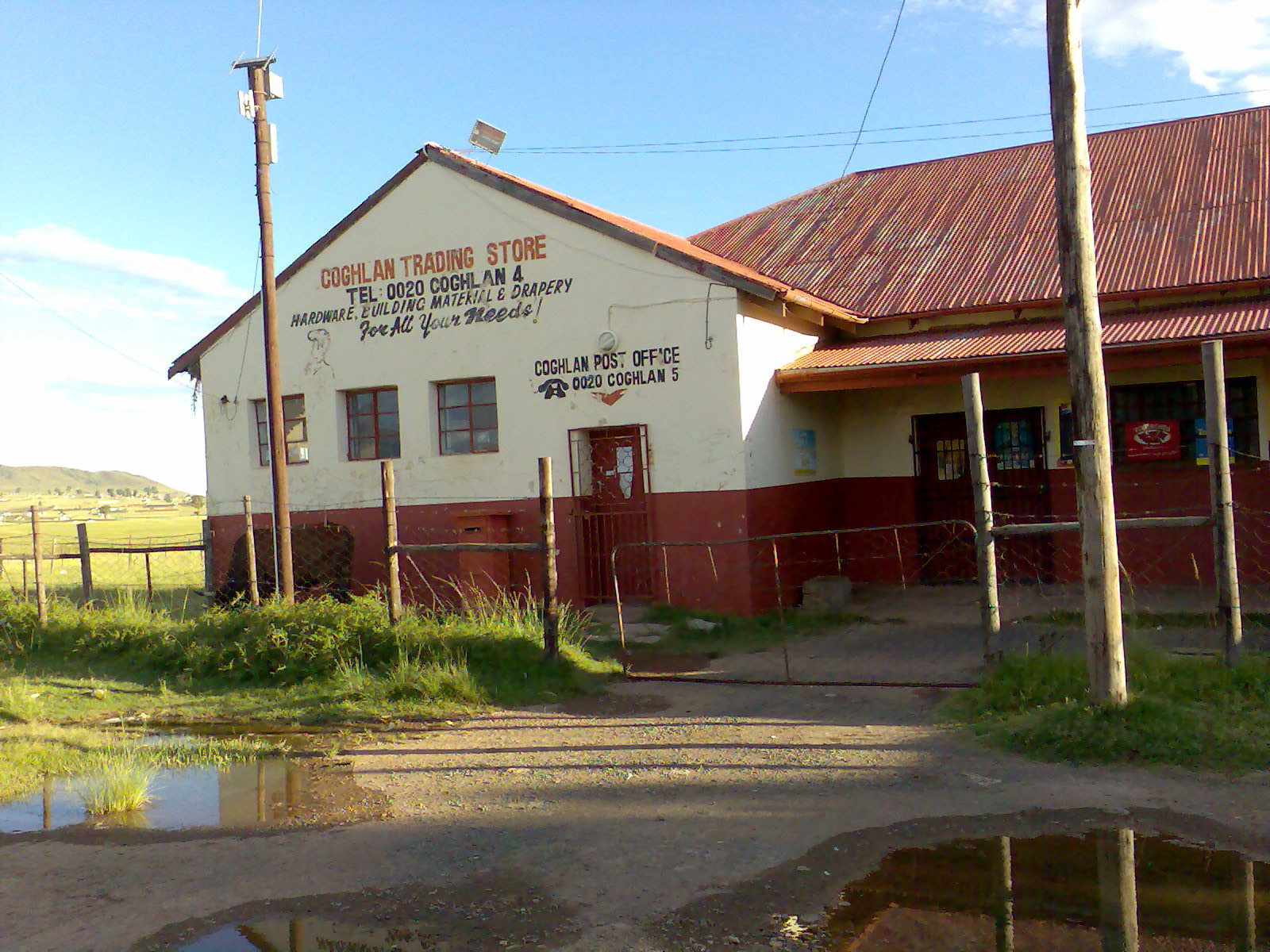
- Coghlan Trading Store and Post Office

- Location within Eastern Cape Location within South Africa
- Coordinates: 31°39′S 28°14′E
- Country: South Africa
- Province: Eastern Cape
- District: Chris Hani
- Municipality: Engcobo

Area
  - Total: 1.47 km^{2} (0.57 sq mi)

Population (2001)
  - Total: 517
  - Density: 352/km^{2} (911/sq mi)
- Time zone: UTC+2 (SAST)
- Postal code (street): 5054
- PO box: 5054

Coghlan is a small South African village in the Eastern Cape on the road between Ngcobo and Mthatha and due north from Xuka Drift on the Xuka River. The Xuka River and the Xinika River are the two main tributaries of the Mbashe River.

It has a guest house and village shop.

== See also ==
- Charles Patrick John Coghlan
