= Umgababa =

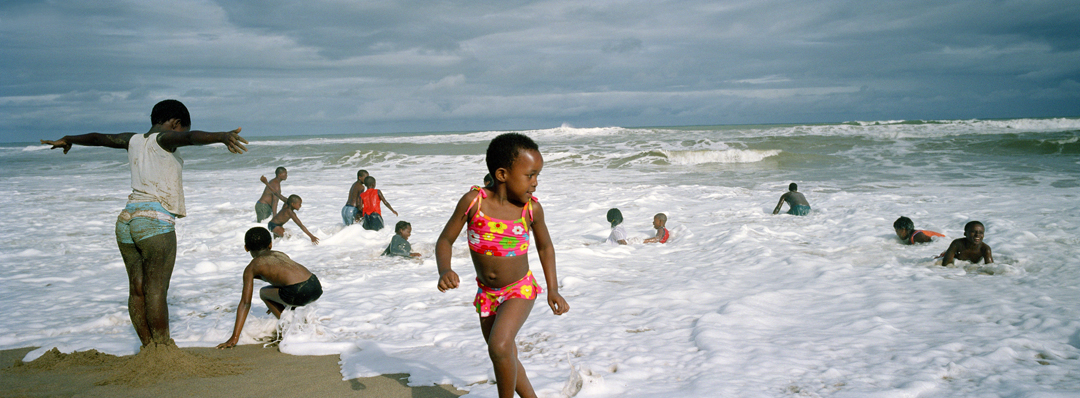
- Children on the beach in Umgababa

- Location within KwaZulu-Natal Location within South Africa
- Coordinates: 30.140°S 30.836°E
- Country: South Africa
- Province: KwaZulu-Natal
- Municipality: eThekwini

Area
  - Total: 2.63 km^{2} (1.02 sq mi)

Population (2001)
  - Total: 4,059
  - Density: 1,540/km^{2} (4,000/sq mi)

Racial makeup (2001)
  - Black African: 99.0%
  - Coloured: 0.3%
  - White: 0.7%

First languages (2001)
  - Zulu: 96.2%
  - Xhosa: 2.1%
- Time zone: UTC+2 (SAST)
- PO box: 4126
- Area code: 031

Umgababa is a rural community situated on the South Coast of KwaZulu-Natal, approximately 38 kilometres (23.6 mi) south of Durban, and forms part of the eThekwini Metropolitan Municipality.

== Etymology ==
The river valley's name uMgababa is of Zulu origin meaning My father's wife, its origin from a tribal feud.

== Geography ==
Situated between the coastal towns of Kingsburgh to the north and Umkomaas (eMkhomazi) to the south, Umgababa is named after the Umgababa River (originally "Umkababa", which means "my father's wife") which enters the ocean south of the area. The origin of the river is at an elevation of 51 meters above sea level. Umgababa River is also known as Umtateni River. The name is derived from an ancient Zulu Chief Luthuli who used to live in the valley. The Chief of Umgababa is Phathisizwe Philbert Luthuli.

== Economy ==
=== Agriculture ===
Litchis are produced in this region.

=== Mining ===
There once was a large titanium mine here but it closed due to serious sea pollution.

== Culture and contemporary life ==
=== Tourism ===
In a few years it has grown from a rural area into a tourist site. The area now hosts the biggest annual year-end event consisting of many popular South African musicians on New Year's Eve. Currently there are plans to build amphitheatres and permanent performance stages.
