= Umkomazi River =

River in KwaZulu-Natal, South Africa

uMkhomazi River Umkomazi, Mkhomazi, Umkomaas
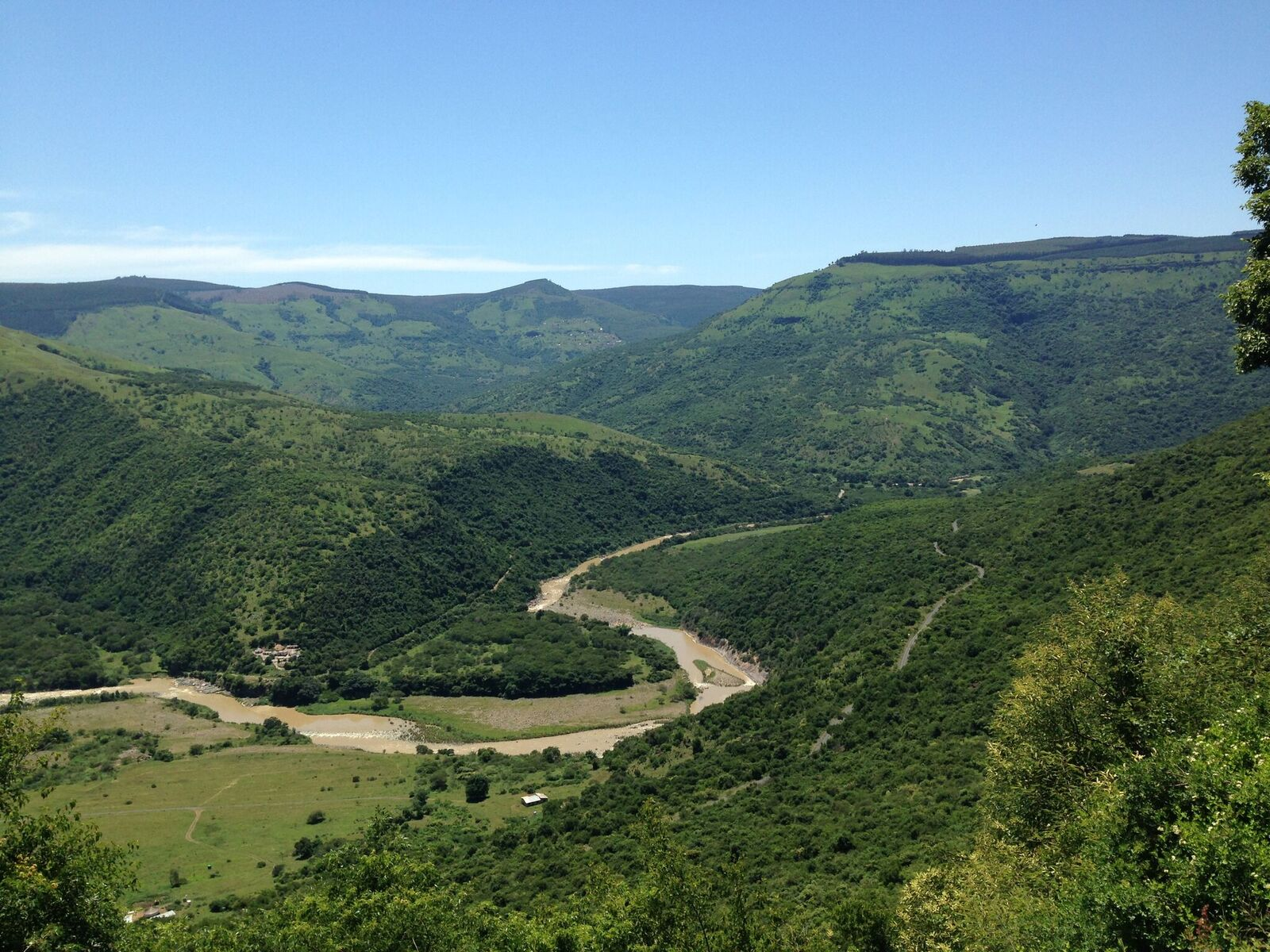
- uMkhomazi River Valley

- Location of the uMkhomazi River mouth
- Etymology: Meaning 'the place of she-whales' in the Zulu language

Location
- Country: South Africa
- Region: KwaZulu-Natal

Physical characteristics
- Source: Near Thabana Ntlenyana
  - location: Drakensberg, Lesotho
  - elevation: 3,000 m (9,800 ft)
- Mouth: Indian Ocean
  - location: eMkhomazi
  - coordinates: 30°12′1″S 30°48′4″E
  - elevation: 0 m (0 ft)

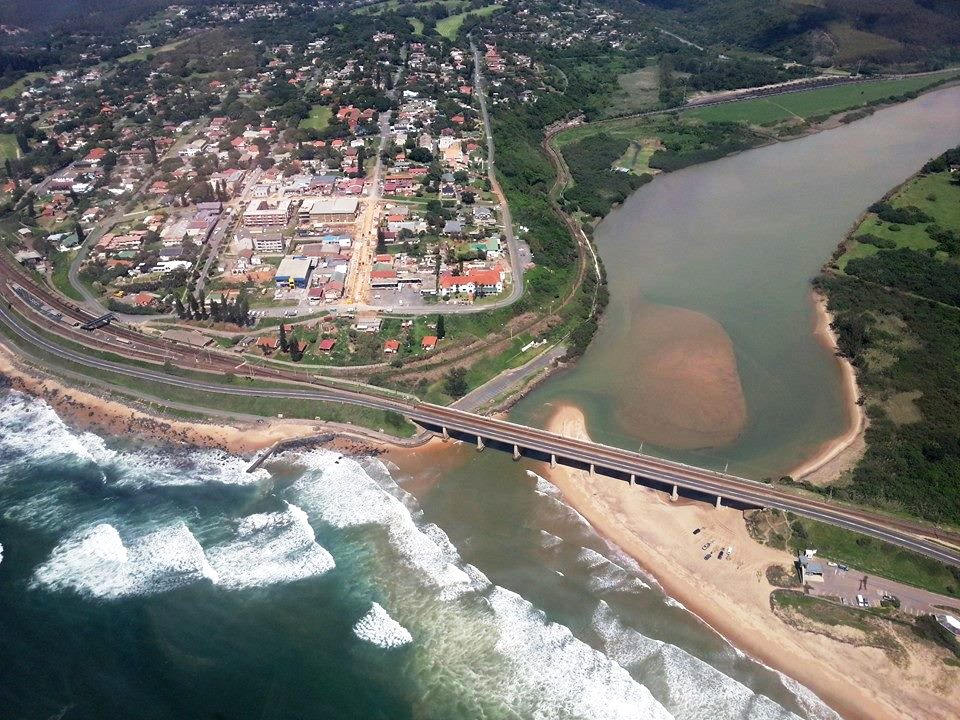
Mouth of the uMkhomazi River

The uMkhomazi River is a river in KwaZulu-Natal, South Africa.

== Course ==
It rises in some of the highest eastwards-facing slopes of the Drakensberg mountains, near the mighty Thabana Ntlenyana. The river flows southeastwards towards the Indian Ocean, which it enters through a navigable estuary at Umkomaas (eMkhomazi), about 50 km southwest of Durban. Its main tributaries are the Loteni, Nzinga, Mkomazane, Elands and the Xobho River.

Towns on the uMkhomazi drainage basin include Bulwer, Impendle, Ixopo, Craigieburn and Boston. Presently the only dam in its catchment area is the Ixopo Dam, but other dams are planned.

The uMkhomazi is part of the Mvoti to Umzimkulu Water Management Area.

== Ecology ==
The Mkhomazi State Forest and the Mkhomazi Wilderness Area are protected areas in the upper course of the Umkomazi River.

The scaly yellowfish (Labeobarbus natalensis) is a fish found in the uMkhomazi River System as well as in the Umgeni, Umzimkulu, Tukhela and the Umfolozi. It is a common endemic species in KwaZulu-Natal Province and it lives in different habitats between the Drakensberg foothills and the coastal lowlands.

== Activities on the river ==
An annual two-day canoe (kayak) race is held on the river. "The Umko" is the second-oldest river marathon and the only one which neither starts nor finishes in a city or town. First held in 1966 the race was initially over three days. The overall distance has varied from 145 km down to the present length of 68 km. Famed as the roughest water race to be paddled in sprint boats which make negotiating the category 1 - 4 rapids tricky, it also had the longest daily sections when the distance was 130 km over two days. The race is held in a remote and rugged valley which makes access difficult and walking out a challenge if one should break a boat irreparably. Stories of paddlers spending a night in the valley before being able to walk out the next day have regularly made the national press and national radio. This premier wildwater race is organised by Kingfisher Canoe Club of Durban and attracts around 180 to 300 paddlers annually.

2016 saw the 50th running of the event and, remarkably, the 50th consecutive participation of the winner of the very first race, Charles Mason. Mason has completed 49 marathons, failing only in the 1970 event when he broke up 19 km into the 145 km race (one of the "four long years" in which the longest course was paddled from Hella Hella to the sea).

The race has had two starting points: Josephine's Bridge on the Richmond-Ixopo road, and Hella Hella bridge on the Richmond-Donnybrook road. The river between Hella Hella and the Number Eight rapid 20 km downstream has the steepest gradient (a fall of 7,6m per kilometre) and contains the toughest series of rapids. This section has been included in most, but not all, the races. The race has had many finishing points over the years depending mainly on weather, logistics and overland access.

The race has been run for 50 consecutive summers. In the 1971/1972 summer the race was moved to March 1972 resulting in no race in calendar 1971, but no summer has been missed. The current Umko champion Hank McGregor is also the current World Canoe Marathon champion, having won the 2016 world champs in Brandenburg, Germany.

== History ==
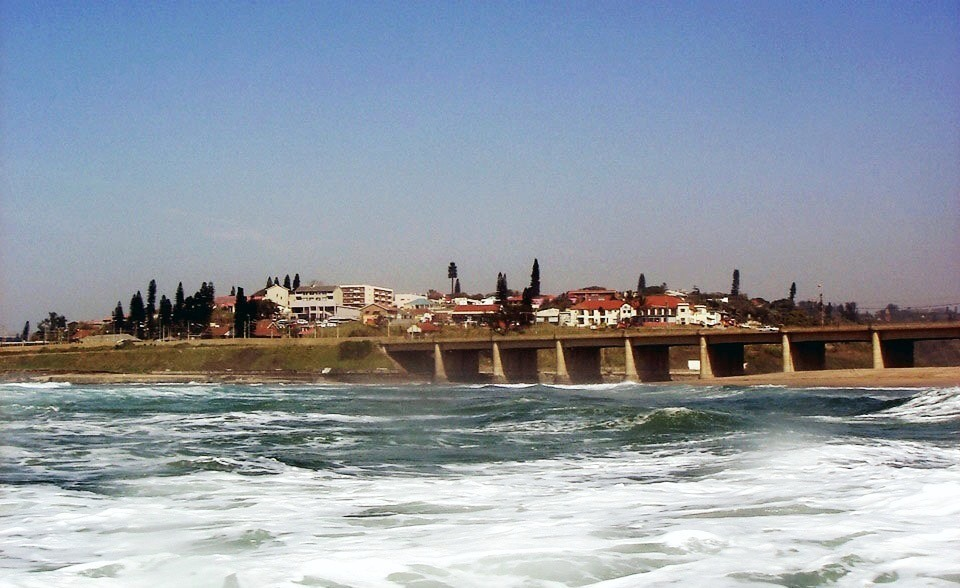
Surf near the uMkhomazi River mouth at eMkhomazi, considered to be a safe swimming beach

The first recorded trip down the river was in 1951 when Ian Player and Fred Schmidt paddled down from Josephine's bridge to the sea at Umkomaas village where the river flows into the Indian Ocean. Player was at the time famous for having won the first Dusi Canoe marathon earlier that year and later became famous in wildlife conservation, especially for having saved the white rhino from extinction. They took seven days to complete the 113 km distance and were supported by friendly inhabitants of the valley when they ran out of supplies. Various other trips were undertaken culminating in trips in 1965 and 1966 aimed specifically at the feasibility of holding a race, which necessitated scouting the river and roads along the banks for two accessible overnight campsites. Charles Mason was instrumental in that undertaking, succeeding in the scouting of the river and the access roads and in persuading the powers-that-be to sanction the new race on the South African canoeing calendar. He went on to win the first race with Tank Rogers, narrowly beating Paul Chalupsky and Jimmy Potgieter.

Chalupsky went on to win the race seven times up to 1977. Other multiple winners include Tony Scott (six times to 1984); Robbie Herreveld (nine times to 2000); Deon Bruss (six times to 2008); Hank McGregor (seven times to 2016).

Staying overnight in a temporary camp in the remote valley was a compulsory part of the race for many years but in latter years this has changed with the overnight stop now being easily accessible at the Hella Hella bridge (now the start of the second day in a reverse-order format since 2009 which has greatly simplified the challenging logistics of the race and hopefully ensured its survival).

== See also ==
- List of rivers of South Africa
- List of estuaries of South Africa
