= Lovu River =

Illovo River Lovu
- Location of the Illovu River mouth

Location
- Country: South Africa
- Region: KwaZulu-Natal

Physical characteristics
- Source: Near Richmond
  - location: Drakensberg
  - elevation: 883
- Mouth: Indian Ocean
  - location: Winklespruit.
  - coordinates: 30°06′S 30°51′E
  - elevation: 0 m (0 ft)
- Length: shorter than 100 km

The iLovu River, alternatively rendered the Illovo River is a river in the KwaZulu-Natal Province of South Africa. It rises in the upper Illovo area in the Richmond vicinity near the Drakensberg, and empties into the Indian Ocean near Winklespruit, on the South Coast.

The name "Lovu" (adapted to also become "Illovo") is a Zulu name which is said to mean ‘welcome’, derived from the name of a type of tree (Cordia caffra), and to mean ‘the wild, ill-tempered one’.
