= Illovo Beach =

- Location within KwaZulu-Natal Location within South Africa
- Coordinates: 30°07′S 30°51′E
- Country: South Africa
- Province: KwaZulu-Natal
- Municipality: eThekwini
- Main Place: Kingsburgh

Area
  - Total: 1.03 km^{2} (0.40 sq mi)

Population (2011)
  - Total: 1,103
  - Density: 1,070/km^{2} (2,770/sq mi)

Racial makeup (2011)
  - Black African: 11.4%
  - Coloured: 1.2%
  - Indian/Asian: 4.1%
  - White: 82.6%
  - Other: 0.7%

First languages (2011)
  - English: 58.0%
  - Afrikaans: 31.8%
  - Zulu: 7.2%
  - Other: 3.0%
- Time zone: UTC+2 (SAST)
- Postal code (street): 4126
- PO box: 4155

Illovo Beach is a small coastal resort on the banks of the Lovu River in KwaZulu-Natal, South Africa. It is now part of eThekwini. The river was named by the Zulus "iLovu" because of the mlovu trees growing on its banks.
