= Kingsburgh, KwaZulu-Natal =

Kingsburgh
- Town
- Location within KwaZulu-Natal Location within South Africa
- Coordinates: 30°05′S 30°52′E
- Country: South Africa
- Province: KwaZulu-Natal
- Municipality: eThekwini

Area
  - Total: 11.65 km^{2} (4.50 sq mi)

Population (2011)
  - Total: 16,368
  - Density: 1,405/km^{2} (3,639/sq mi)

Racial makeup (2011)
  - White: 70.4%
  - Black African: 22.7%
  - Indian/Asian: 4.6%
  - Coloured: 1.9%
  - Other: 0.4%

First languages (2011)
  - English: 53.4%
  - Afrikaans: 28.1%
  - Zulu: 15.2%
  - Other: 3.2%
- Time zone: UTC+2 (SAST)
- Postal code (street): 4126

Kingsburgh is a coastal resort town along the South Coast of KwaZulu-Natal, South Africa, approximately 32 kilometres (20 miles) south-west of Durban.

Kingsburgh and its neighbouring town of Amanzimtoti together form a southern extension of the Greater Durban metropolitan region. The town is frequently considered part of the broader Amanzimtoti area, as the two towns share the same postal code and function as an integrated urban corridor.

== History ==
Originally known as Southern Umlazi, it became a township in October 1942 and reached borough status in August 1952. Probably named after Richard Philip (Dick) King (1811-1871) who rode along here from Durban to Grahamstown on horseback to secure assistance for beleaguered British troops in 1842.

== Geography ==
=== Location ===
Situated on the Sapphire Coast, approximately 26 kilometres (16 mi) north-east of Scottburgh and 32 kilometres (20 mi) south-east of Durban, Kingsburgh is bounded by Amanzimtoti to the north, Umgababa to the south and the Indian Ocean coastline to the east.

=== Suburbs ===
Bisected by the N2 freeway, Kingsburgh comprises the coastal resorts of Doonside, Warner Beach, Winklespruit and Illovo Beach on the seaward side of the N2 and the hilly suburbs of Doonheights, Shulton Park, Illovo Glen, St Winifred’s and Astra Park on the inward side of the N2.

== Economy ==
=== Tourism ===
The economy of Kingsburgh is strongly driven by tourism and hospitality, particularly through the concentration of hotels and holiday accommodation along its coastline. Prominent establishments include The View Boutique Hotel & Spa and ZAR Hotel, both in Doonside, the ATKV Natalia Resort and the Villa Spa Holiday Resort, both in Illovo Beach and Protea Hotel Karridene Beach in Karridene.

=== Retail ===
Winklespruit offers three primary shopping centres for Kingsburgh residents, namely Kingsburgh Junction (recently opened in July 2026) in Doonside, Kingsburgh Centre in Winklespruit and DSM Mall in Winklespruit. For a broader retail selection, most people travel to nearby Amanzimtoti, which hosts larger centres like Galleria Mall and Arbour Crossing.

== Transport ==
=== Rail ===
Kingsburgh is served by the South Coast railway line, connecting its five railway stations; Doonside, Warner Beach, Winklespruit, Illovo Beach and Karridene. The South Coast service operated by Metrorail runs northwards to Durban via Amanzimtoti and southwards to Kelso via Umgababa.

=== Road ===
Road connectivity in Kingsburgh is anchored by the N2 freeway, which connects Durban to the north-east with Port Shepstone to the south-west.

Additional arterial routes include:

- R102 (Andrew Zondo Road; Winklespruit Road) – connects eManzimtoti to the north with Umgababa to the south
- R603 (Sbu Mkhize Drive) – connects Kingsburgh with Umbumbulu to the north-west and is often utilised as an alternative route to the N3 for travel between the South Coast and Pietermaritzburg.
