= Umkomaas =

Small coastal village in KwaZulu-Natal, South Africa

- eMkhomazi
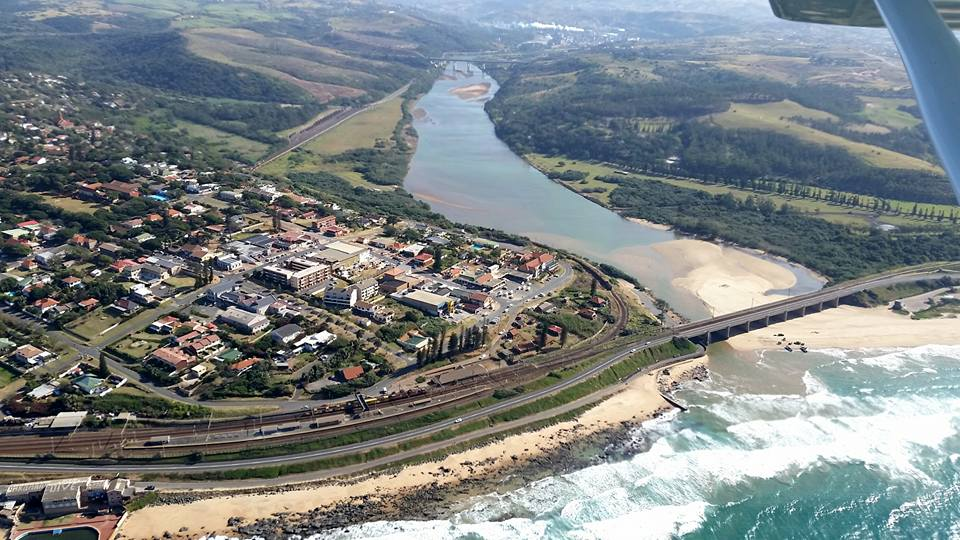
- Aerial view of Umkomaas village and beach, January 2017

- Location within KwaZulu-Natal Location within South Africa
- Coordinates: 30.201°S 30.794°E
- Country: South Africa
- Province: KwaZulu-Natal
- Municipality: eThekwini
- Established: c. 1861

Area
  - Total: 6.14 km^{2} (2.37 sq mi)

Population (2011)
  - Total: 2,716
  - Density: 442/km^{2} (1,150/sq mi)

Racial makeup (2011)
  - Black African: 19.3%
  - Coloured: 1.9%
  - Indian/Asian: 14.0%
  - White: 64.2%
  - Other: 0.6%

First languages (2011)
  - English: 61.5%
  - Afrikaans: 22.6%
  - Zulu: 11.9%
  - Other: 4.0%
- Time zone: UTC+2 (SAST)
- Postal code (street): 4170
- PO box: 4170
- Area code: 039

Umkomaas, also known by its official name eMkhomazi, is a small coastal town on the subtropical South Coast of KwaZulu-Natal, South Africa was formed when a harbour was built in 1861 to export sugar. The town rests beside the mouth of the navigable uMkhomazi River, also known as the Mkhomazi or Umkomaas. With the successful dredging of Durban harbour's sandbar and arrival of the railway, like Port Shepstone, the harbour fell into disuse, but the village came to life. It is administered as eMkhomazi Area, together with the nearby areas of Craigieburn, Clansthal, Ilfracombe, Crowder, Amahlongwa and Hull Valley as part Ward 99 in the eThekwini Metropolitan Municipality

== Etymology ==
Many whales once used the estuary as a nursery, giving birth in the shallows. The Zulus named the river after this spectacle (uMkhomazi means the place of cow whales). The settlement was originally known as South Barrow, with its suburb known today as Ilfracombe then called North Barrow.

=== Name change ===
In November 2009, the eThekwini Metropolitan Municipality submitted a list of places in the municipality to the KwaZulu-Natal Provincial Geographic Names Committee to be changed from their anglicised names to the correct Zulu spelling. In the list, the town “Umkomaas” was to be changed to "eMkhomazi" and the Umkomaas River was to be changed to "uMkhomazi".

On 1 October 2010, the KwaZulu-Natal Department of Arts and Culture gazette the list of approved name changes which included the eMkhomazi town and uMkhomazi river. However, no changes have been made on road signs in the area regarding the spelling and many residents and businesses of area still spell the town with its original spelling of “Umkomaas”.

== History ==
=== Colonial Era ===
The area came into prominence in the mid-19th century when Theophilus Shepstone, the Secretary for Native Affairs, proposed the establishment of a “black kingdom” south of the uMkhomazi River in 1851. However, this plan was rejected by the colonial authorities. The first official colonial presence began in July 1853 when Henry Francis Fynn was appointed Assistant Resident Magistrate in the Lower Umkomaas division. He also operated the first ferry service across the river, which was essential due to the presence of crocodiles.

The turning point for the South Coast, including Umkomaas, was in 1857 when the Legislative Council decided to promote development by opening up Crown land grants. This led to a flurry of interest, and by 1859, there were 93 colonists in the coastal area between the uMkhomazi and Ifafa rivers. The success of sugar plantations, especially John McKenzie’s Craigie Burn estate, contributed significantly to the area’s development.

It was established as settlement around 1861 when a harbor was constructed to facilitate the export of sugar. In Umkomaas, the entry of the ship Natalie was seen as a breakthrough for travel and transportation, as it brought access to Durban within a few hours, saving significant costs per ton of cargo. After inspecting the river mouth in 1872, the Surveyor-General, Dr P.C. Sutherland noted that until the settlement at Umkomaas grew in size, there was no urgency to expend further resources on developing the river mouth. Leading way to the slow disuse of the harbour and eventual abandonment once the dredging of Durban Harbour was successful.

=== World War II plane crash ===
A notable event in the village's history was the fatal air crash involving a War Hawk Air Force plane during the Second World War. On 30 March 1944 during a routine practice battle formation, two Kittyhawks (5067 piloted by FO Brown) and 5006 (piloted by PO Smith) collided in mid air. 5006 managed to make a forced landing next to the river and pilot Smith escaped with his life. The second plane was not so fortunate; Brown was unable to bale from the plane and went down with the craft on the south bank of the Umkomaas river near the site where Saiccor is today. The aeroplane is believed to have sunk into quicksand on the south bank of the river between the village and the present-day location of Saiccor. A local group made numerous attempts to recover the wreckage of the craft in the 1980s, but as the precise location of the plane is still not decisively known, it has never been recovered. Subsequently much speculation exists as to where exactly the plane is buried.

The South African Navy mine countermeasures vessel SAS Umkomaas is named in honour of the river and village.

== Geography ==
Located approximately 50 km south-west of Durban and almost halfway between Scottburgh and Kingsburgh, eMkhomazi and its neighbouring coastal village of Clansthal form the southernmost part of the eThekwini Municipality and the Sapphire Coast.

=== Topography ===
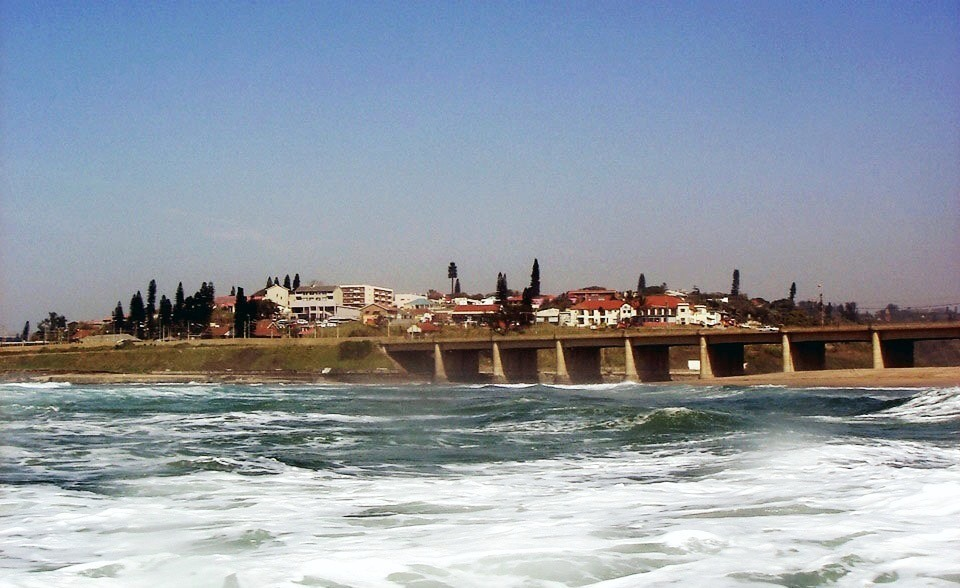
Umkomaas — surf near Mkomazi River mouth, September 2007

The uMkhomazi River is a dominant feature of the area, being the largest river on the South Coast. The river is 298 kilometres long, from its source just south of Giant's Castle in the uKhahlamba / Drakensberg Park World Heritage Site to its mouth on the Indian Ocean. The river begins its journey at an altitude of over 3,000 metres.

Occasionally, raft races, canoeing, and other sporting events are held on the river. The river is a popular white-water rafting destination. During the winter dry season, the river mouth often silts up, but after heavy rains it carries large amounts of brown sediment into the Indian Ocean. Some of this sedimentation is due to anthropogenic (human-made) pressures on the local ecosystem. These pressures include soil erosion caused by over-grazing, intensive cultivation, sewage disposal, informal farming and settlements, timber plantations, and the removal of sand or topsoil from the river's basin.

The uMkhomazi river valley is mentioned in an early chapter of Alan Paton's 1948 novel Cry, the Beloved Country. Probably derived from the Zulu word uMkhamazi, the name relates to the sighting of a whale in the river estuary at some point in history. The river's tributaries include the Madoba, Mkhomazana, Mtungwane, Nhlatimbe and Nhlavini.

The river's basin covers about 4,315 km^{2}, annual discharge is approximately 1 x 106 m^{3} and sediment load is an estimated 900 000 tons per year. Some parts of the river basin are vulnerable to flooding due to the steep topography and weather systems, such as intense thunderstorms and cut-off lows. This is exacerbated by land degradation and impervious urban areas. Some floods have resulted in loss of life, destruction of properties where development has encroached on floodplains in densely populated areas, and damage to roads and bridges.

=== Communities ===
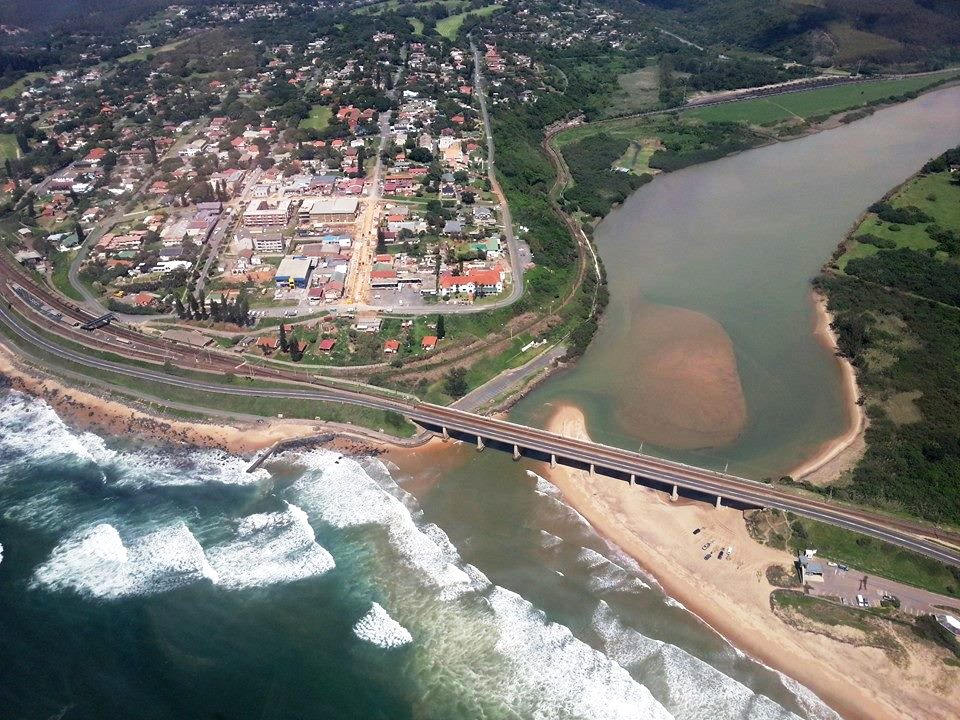
Another aerial view of Umkomaas village and beach, April 2016

Suburbs of Umkomaas include Sunpark, Newhaven, Drift and Widenham, known for its large bush-covered sand dune known as "Sand City", and the planned community of Saiccor Village, built for Saiccor workers in the 1950s and 1960s. Beaches are at Widenham and the Mkomazi River north bank near Ilfracombe, which is the launching point for many boat and diving trips to the Aliwal Shoal.

There are also locations nearby, which form part of the village, such as Craigieburn, Roseneath, Clansthal, Ilfracombe and Magabeni.

==== Craigieburn ====
Craigieburn location which also includes Naidooville is at the heart of the Indian community that reside in Umkomaas. In present day (2022) Census stats rated that the poorest of Indian families hail from Umkomaas. The name, Naidooville is not commonly used today as most refer to it by Craigieburn and is located west of the N2 highway. Formally an Indian School, Naidooville Primary School was built in the area.

==== Roseneath ====
Roseneath is a small township near Umkomaas, in the south coast region of KwaZulu Natal. Like Craigieburn, it is situated west of the N2 Highway. There are other townships found in this area including Malundi, locally known as V section, Roseneath Gardens (emasayithini) and New Haven.

==== Magabeni ====
Magabeni is a township located a few kilometres northwest of Umkomaas and was formerly part of the KwaZulu Bantustan.

== Demographics ==
The population of Umkomaas in 2011 was 2,716, excluding Ilfracombe.

== Economy ==
=== Industry ===
In 1954 an Italian consortium developed the large Saiccor industrial cellulose plant beside the river a short distance inland from the village. Many Italian immigrants and workers, mostly from the region of Friuli in Northeast Italy, followed suit, and the result is that Umkomaas probably had the largest Italian community relative to its total population of any village in Southern Africa.

Saiccor has for some time been a controversial plant. It was purchased by international pulp and paper giant Sappi in 1988, and while it continues to provide jobs for about 1200 workers, and a livelihood for their dependents, concerns were raised as early as the 1990s over Saiccor's adverse effect on asthmatic children at the nearby Umkomaas Drift School. In 1999 Saiccor paid for the relocation of the school.

Additionally, a large amount of effluent is pumped out to sea, and major extensions of this effluent pipe were carried out in 1987 and 1999, though Saiccor maintained for many years that the effluent was largely harmless. A well-known act was when Saiccor chief executive was challenged to drink a glass of effluent at a company function.

Saiccor is today the world's largest producer of chemical cellulose, and employs about 1200 people directly and about 20 000 indirectly, its pulp being used largely for products such as viscose, acetate and cellophane. In 2012 the company said almost half its staff came from Umkomaas, Magabeni, Craigieburn, Roseneath and Widenham.

The manufacture of over 1 billion components annually for the packaging industry and furniture assembly are also carried out in the area. Additional infrastructure includes the roads and railways built by and for Saiccor's operations, together with a stretch of Spoornet-owned coastal track, on which Saiccor to this day maintains and operates classic steam engines.

There are some eucalyptus and wattle plantations on higher inland ground in the general area, many of which were established for Saiccor. But most of the farming done around Umkomaas is for sugar cane and these fields are a noticeable landscape feature.

== Culture and contemporary life ==
=== Tourism ===
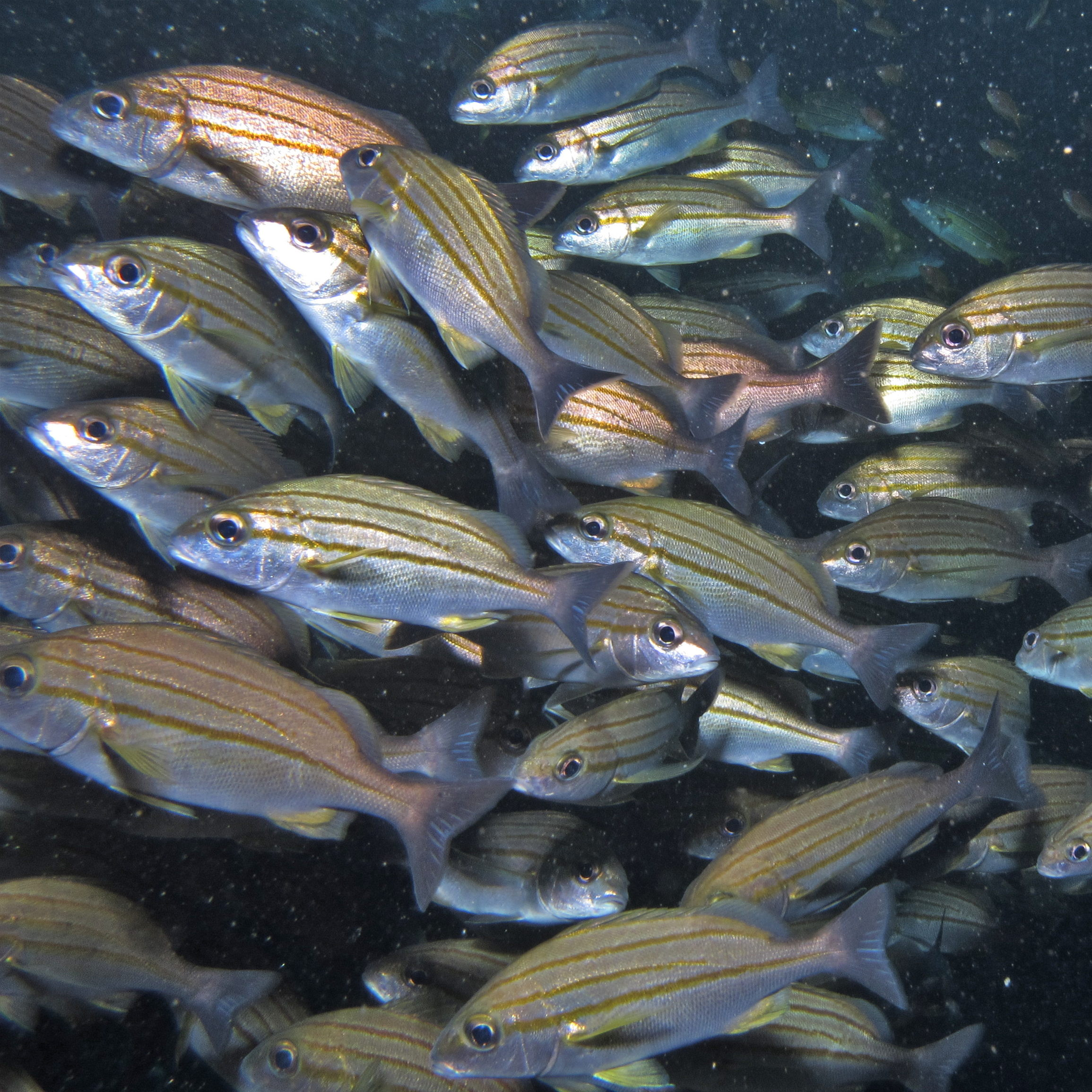
School of striped grunters (Pomadasys striatus) at the Aliwal Shoal

Tourist attractions include the Umkomaas Golf Course, home of Tim Clark and widely regarded as being one of the best in KwaZulu-Natal, and the beautiful Empisini Nature Reserve, a forested area adjacent to town that features a delightful waterfall and a number of bush walks. The nearby settlement of Clansthal was the home of conservationist Tony Pooley in the 1980s and 1990s. Swedish tennis player Mats Wilander was a regular visitor in the 1990s, and is rumoured to have been the owner of a large hotel on the corner of Moodie and Reynolds Street.

Umkomaas is renowned for the superb diving opportunities created by the Aliwal Shoal, a volcanic reef about 5 kilometres offshore. Ragged-tooth sharks, rock cod, and a number of other species can be found in the shoal.

Diving-related tourism has grown dramatically in the past decade, although the Shoal features two especially fine shipwrecks, the Nebo and the Produce, that long predate the Shoal's current surge in popularity. The Aliwal Shoal was formed about 80 000 years ago. Diving and accommodation information is available in the village and online.

To add to Umkomaas and activities is a newly established airfield called "Umkomaas Airfield" just outside of Umkomaas where microlight and aeroplane joyrides and training take place.

== Education ==
A co-educational primary school, founded in 1913, is in the centre of the village.

== Parks and greenspace ==
Umkomaas' official animal is the whale, representations of which can be found throughout the village, in everything from colourful murals to the primary school's uniform. Humpback whales are seen near Aliwal Shoal between June and October. Ragged-tooth and Zambezi sharks have been seen at the river mouth, in the wake of the September 1987 storms and 1984's Cyclone Domoina.

Other wildlife in the area includes snakes, most of them non-venomous species including the red-lipped herald and the brown house snake. However, black mamba have also been found in the area. Monkeys here are less common than in Scottburgh, but birds are abundant, including the hadeda ibis. Small wild cats like the genet and civet have been reported on rare occasions. Nile crocodiles found near Freeland Park and the lower Amahlongwa, 8 kilometres south, are not present in Umkomaas. Duiker abound and can be seen in Empisini. The larger bushbuck has also been seen in local bush.

A major spectacle occurring most years is the Sardine Run, the annual courtship migration (contingent on climatic conditions) of sardines from South Africa's southern coast to the warmer waters of KwaZulu-Natal. It usually occurs in July and has featured on Jeff Corwin's show on Animal Planet. The sardine attract many predatory fish, seabirds, and sharks, on a scale rarely seen anywhere else.

Umkomaas was one of the coastal villages affected by the high winds and freak waves generated by the storms of late March 2007. Beachfront areas and the complex formerly known as 'The Whaler' were some parts of the village damaged in the storm.

== Infrastructure ==
=== Transportation ===
==== Roads ====
The village is located 48 km south of central Durban and is accessible by rail and by roads including the N2 Freeway and the coastal R102 or "Old Main Road."
