= List of cities and towns in KwaZulu-Natal =

This is a list of cities and towns found in KwaZulu-Natal, South Africa. They are divided according to the districts in which they are located.

In the case of settlements that have had their official names changed the traditional name is listed first followed by the new name.

== Amajuba ==
Amajuba District Municipality

- Dannhauser
- Hattingspruit
- Madadeni
- Newcastle
- Mountain View (Osizweni)
- Charlestown
- Ngagane
- Emadlangeni
- Kingsley

== eThekwini ==
eThekwini Metropolitan Municipality

- ekuPhakameni
- Adams Mission
- Amanzimtoti (eManzimtoti)
- Assagay
- Botha's Hill
- Cato Ridge
- Chatsworth
- Clermont
- Durban
- Gillitts
- Hillcrest
- Inanda
- Inchanga
- Isipingo
- Kingsburgh
- Kloof
- KwaMakhutha
- KwaMashu
- La Mercy
- Mpumalanga
- New Germany
- Ntuzuma
- Tongaat (oThongathi)
- Pinetown
- Phoenix
- Prospecton
- Queensburgh
- Shallcross
- Umbumbulu
- Umdloti (eMdloti)
- Umgababa
- Umhlanga (uMhlanga)
- Umkomaas (eMkhomazi)
- Umlazi
- Verulam
- Waterfall
- Westville

== Harry Gwala ==
Harry Gwala District Municipality

- Bulwer
- Franklin
- Himeville
- Stuartstown (Ixopo)
- Kokstad
- Umzimkulu
- Underberg

== iLembe ==
iLembe District Municipality

- Ballito
- Groutville
- Shakaskraal
- Stanger (KwaDukuza)
- Salt Rock
- Mandeni
- Maphumulo
- Umhlali

== Ugu ==
Ugu District Municipality

- Amahlongwa
- Amandawe
- Anerley
- Bazley Beach
- Dududu
- Gamalakhe
- Harding
- Hibberdene
- Ifafa Beach
- Izingolweni (eZinqoleni)
- Izotsha
- Kelso
- Leisure Bay
- KwaCele
- Manaba Beach
- Margate
- Marina Beach
- Melville
- Umtalumi (Mthwalume)
- Umzumbe
- Munster
- Oshabeni (oShabeni)
- Palm Beach
- Park Rynie
- Pennington
- Port Edward
- Port Shepstone
- Ramsgate
- Scottburgh
- Sea Park
- Sezela
- Shelly Beach
- Southbroom
- Southport
- Sunwich Port
- Trafalgar
- Umtentweni (eMthenteni)
- Umzinto
- Umzumbe
- Uvongo
- Weza

== uMgungundlovu ==
uMgungundlovu District Municipality

- Balgowan
- Boston
- Hilton
- Howick
- Merrivale
- Mooi River
- New Hanover
- Pietermaritzburg
- Richmond
- Wartburg
- Dalton

== UMkhanyakude ==
UMkhanyakude District Municipality

- Hluhluwe
- Ingwavuma
- Mkuze
- Mtubatuba
- Ubombo
- Jozini
- Mbazwana
- Kosi Bay town (KwaNgwanase)

== Umzinyathi ==
Umzinyathi District Municipality

- Dundee
- Glencoe
- Greytown
- Kranskop
- Pomeroy (Solomon Linda)
- Wasbank
- Nquthu

== uThukela ==
UThukela District Municipality

- Bergville
- Colenso
- Elandslaagte
- Estcourt
- Ladysmith

== Zululand ==
Zululand District Municipality

- Babanango
- Louwsburg
- Mahlabatini
- Nongoma
- Paulpietersburg
- Pongola
- Ulundi
- Vryheid
- Richards Bay
