= Scottburgh =

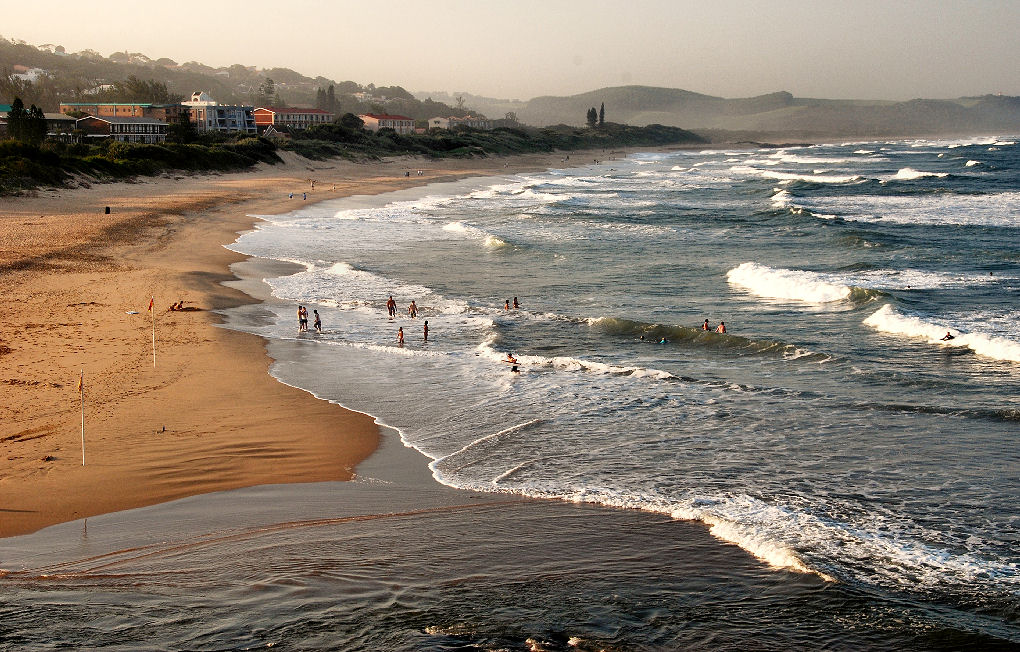
- View of Scottburgh Beach

- Location within KwaZulu-Natal Location within South Africa Location within Africa
- Coordinates: 30°17′S 30°45′E
- Country: South Africa
- Province: KwaZulu-Natal
- District: Ugu
- Municipality: uMdoni
- Established: 1860

Area
  - Total: 23.80 km^{2} (9.19 sq mi)
- Elevation: 19 m (62 ft)

Population (2011)
  - Total: 11,403
  - Density: 479.1/km^{2} (1,241/sq mi)

Racial makeup (2011)
  - Black African: 27.7%
  - Coloured: 3.0%
  - Indian/Asian: 22.0%
  - White: 46.8%
  - Other: 0.6%

First languages (2011)
  - English: 68.0%
  - Zulu: 16.0%
  - Afrikaans: 11.2%
  - Xhosa: 2.1%
  - Other: 2.7%
- Time zone: UTC+2 (SAST)
- Postal code (street): 4180
- PO box: 4180
- Area code: 039

Scottburgh (/ˈskɒtbərə/) is a coastal resort town located along the south coast of KwaZulu-Natal, South Africa. It situated south of the mouth of the Mpambanyoni River (confuser of birds).

Prior to 1 December 2023, vehicle registration plates in Scottburgh started with NX - N for Natal, X for Alexandra as the town once formed part of the Alexandra County in the 1800s along with Umzinto, Umkomaas, Park Rynie and Sezela-Pennington. The reason why it was not registered as NA instead was because the town of Harding, 140 kilometres south-west, already bore the vehicle registration “NA”.

== History ==
Named after Natal Colony Governor John Scott, in 1860 it became the second township at the end of Durban but was initially known as Devonport. Scottburgh then became a very promising port as well as a new attractive location for sugar farms and sugar mills. In about 1850 the town started to attract immigrants especially from Great Britain and Ireland, known as the Byrne Settlers. They came to take advantage of the good harbours, to export their sugar both internally and overseas. Scottburgh became an independent municipality in 1964.

== Law and government ==
Scottburgh is situated in the uMdoni Local Municipality, forming part of the Ugu District Municipality and functions as the municipal/administrative seat for the uMdoni Local Municipality which governs the “Mid South Coast” including Scottburgh, eMuziwezinto (Umzinto), Park Rynie, Pennington, Amahlongwa, Amandawe, Dududu, Sezela, Bazley Beach, Ifafa Beach and Mthwalume.

== Geography ==
=== Location ===
Scottburgh is situated along the uMdoni Coast sub-region (also known as the Mid South Coast) of the KwaZulu-Natal South Coast, approximately 53 km south-west of Durban and 58 km north-east of Port Shepstone. Neighbouring towns of Scottburgh include Amahlongwa, Amandawe, Bazley Beach, Clansthal, Dududu, KwaCele, Sezela, Umkomaas and Umzinto.

=== Communities ===
The 2011 census divided the main area of Scottburgh into seven “sub places”: Scottburgh SP (pop. 2132), Scottburgh South (pop. 1896), Park Rynie (pop. 3732), Pennington (pop. 2332), Selborne Golf Estate (pop. 29) and Kelso (pop. 425) , Freeland Park (pop. 859) .

=== Drainage ===
Scottburgh is a bay situated on the southern banks of the Mpambanyoni River, a short river that culminates in a lagoon. It is one of the best geographic examples of a bay on the South African coast. Mpambanyoni mouth has fluctuated in surface area and volume dramatically over the years, due to the frequent droughts, occasional cyclones, and other extreme weather conditions that can affect KwaZulu-Natal.

Most notorious of the above-mentioned cyclones was Domoina of 1984 and the floods of 1987, which resulted in widespread flooding and infrastructural damage, including the destruction of the Old Main Road bridge from Umkomaas.

=== Wildlife ===
Wildlife found regularly inside the township includes snakes, skinks, geckos, numerous insects, millipedes, bushbuck, mongi, and most famously, large numbers of vervet monkeys. Genets have been sighted, and there are occasional unverified spottings of civets and similar small felines and cat-like mammals. Birds are abundant, perhaps the most noticeable being the raucous and much-loved hadeda ibis.

The Indian mynah is widespread but regarded as a pest due to its habits of defecating in public restaurants and eating areas and pillaging the nests of native birds. This bird has presented similar problems in other areas in South Africa, Australia and New Zealand. The sardine run is also visible from the shores of Scottburgh and its surroundings most winters. The umdoni and Strelitzia are the best-known trees specifically associated with Scottburgh and its environs.

== Economy ==
Scottburgh is also particularly renowned for its large surfing community. Superior waves are to be found along the coast, especially during the winter months. Popular spots include Green Point, Pennington, Kelso, Scottburgh and Rocky Bay. Many other perfect breaks along this coast can be found. Surfers and bodyboarders from around the world come for surf trips around the south coast, and would visit Scottburgh in particular for its worldwide surfing reputation.

However, one appeal of Scottburgh beach is its grass-covered banks leading down to sandy beaches, which have made it a popular holiday resort for holidaymakers for many years.

Most Scottburgh residents work for small local businesses or the state sector, while larger industries are located in the nearby towns of Umkomaas, Umzinto, and Sezela.

North of the Mpambanyoni lies the suburb of Freeland Park, largely residential but also possessing the Cutty Sark Hotel and a river populated by juvenile and adolescent crocodiles. These crocodiles are also the product of the 1987 cyclone, when infant crocodiles escaped from the nearby Crocworld theme park. South of Scottburgh proper, and separated from it by the Country Club, Golf Course, and a considerable expanse of bush, is Scottburgh South, and a few kilometres inland lies the sugarcane farming hamlet of Renishaw, well known for its chapel.

=== Retail ===
Scottburgh is mainly served by Scottburgh Mall, situated on the western outskirts along the R102, with the shopping centre anchored by PicknPay, Woolworths, Clicks and Dis-Chem.

== Culture and contemporary life ==
=== Tourism ===
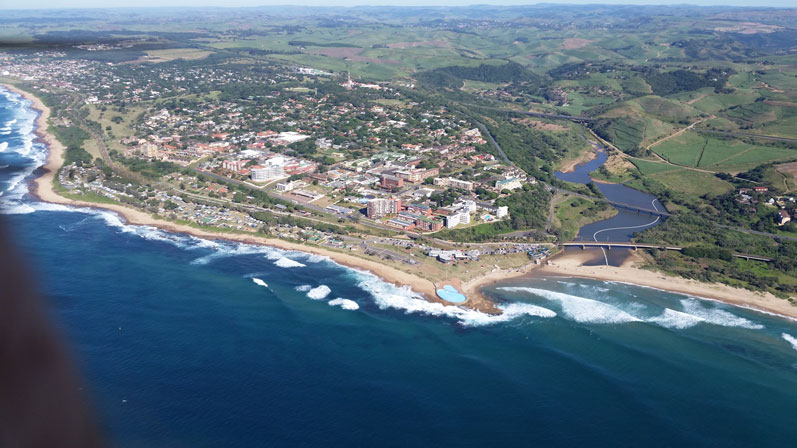
An aerial view of Scottburgh

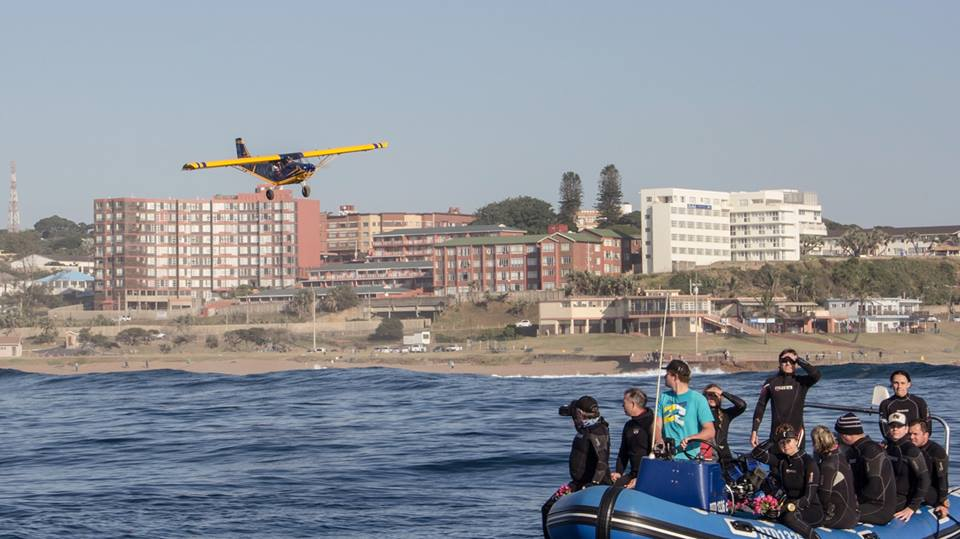

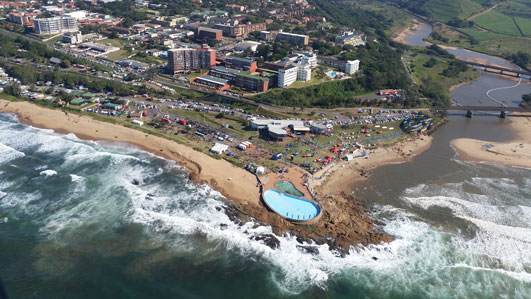

Scottburgh Main beach along with Pennington and Park Rynie have been awarded blue flag status as of the 2014/15 summer season. Scottburgh and Pennington are both very popular for tourists to make their way to the beach. Scottburgh along with the two hotels and many B&Bs is also home to an award-winning caravan park and camping ground.

The summer season sees many tourists from the inland flock to the beaches of the South Coast. There are many activities that contribute to Scottburgh being a popular destination such as microlighting, diving, shark cage diving, sea rides, rock and surf fishing, surfing, bicycle trails and the Umdoni Park run, There are many more activities that can be inquired at the local South Coast tourism office.

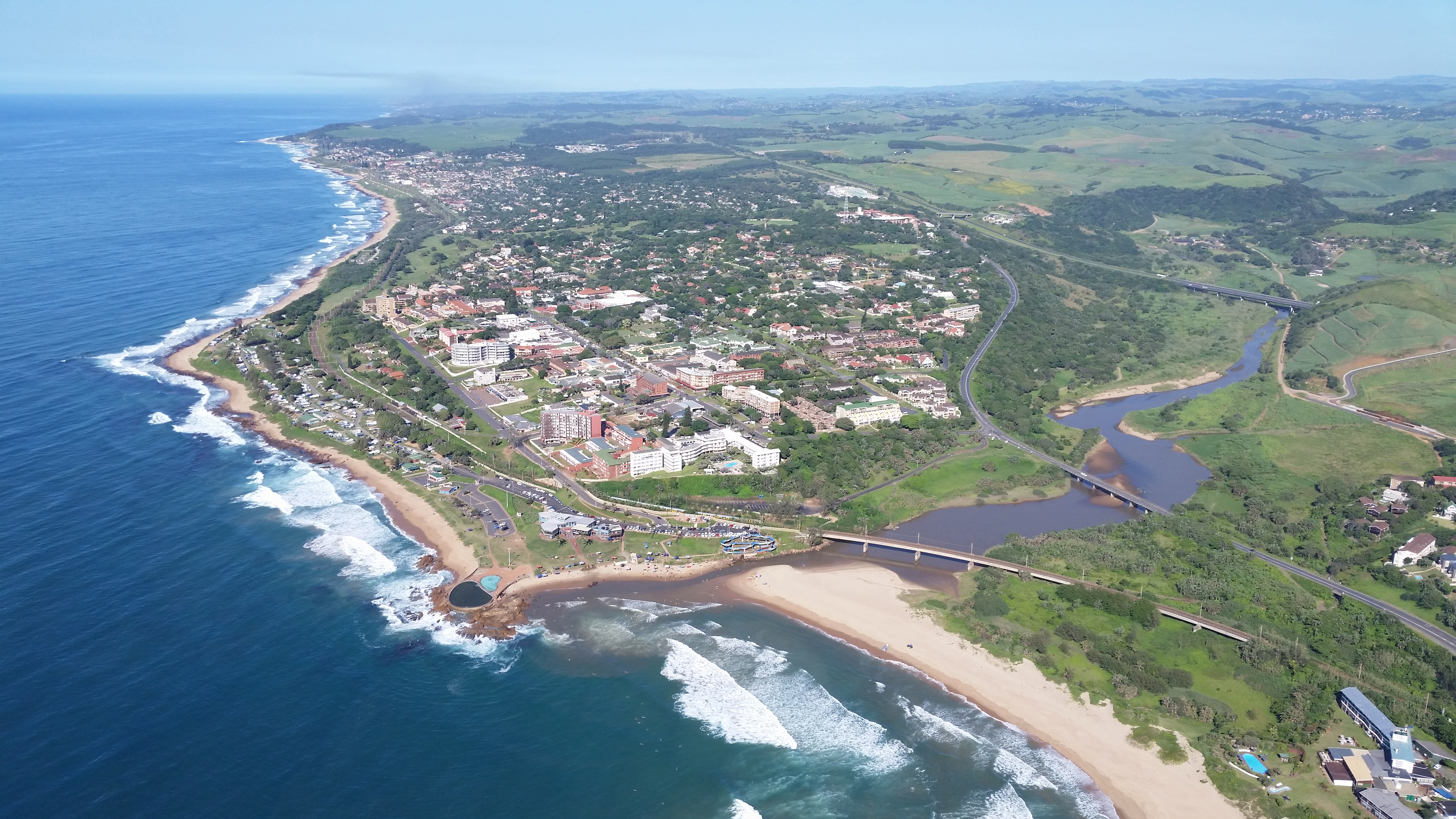
A microlight view of Scottburgh beach

== Education ==
Scottburgh has several educational institutions, including pre-primary schools, a co-ed primary school, and an English medium co-ed high school.

- Scottburgh Pre-Primary
- Hilltop Pre-Primary
- Casa di Montessori Pre-School
- Scottburgh Primary (Grades 1-7),
- Scottburgh High School (Grades 8-12)

== Infrastructure ==
=== Roads ===
The N2 is a major freeway bypassing Scottburgh, connecting Durban to the north with Port Shepstone to the south, with an interchange at Dududu Road (Exit 110).

Scottburgh can also be accessed via the following main roads:

- The R102 (the old main road between Durban and Port Shepstone) – bypasses Scottburgh and connects Umkomaas to the north with Park Rynie and Pennington to the south.
- The P188 (Dududu Road) – connects Scottburgh with Amandawe and Dududu and provides access to the N2.

== Residential developments ==
=== Renishaw Coastal Precinct ===
A 1 300-hectare site in Scottburgh has received sub-division approval and Environmental Authorization for the proposed Renishaw Coastal Precinct, a landmark initiative by Renishaw Property Developments, backed by JSE-listed Crookes Brothers Limited. As the first development of this scale on the KZN Mid-South Coast, it is set to catalyse a major economic revival in the region.

The precinct spans 13 million m², of which only 2.6 million m² will be developed — the remaining 10 million m² will be dedicated to conservation. It comprises five interlinked nodes, with Nodes 1 and 3 already approved under the Umdoni Spatial Planning and Land Use Management Act. Open conservation corridors will ensure free movement between nodes, with arterial routes and dedicated lanes for bicycles and golf carts.

The Node 3 interchange will serve as the business and social hub, with zoning approved for a private school, hospital, shopping centre, office parks, and light commercial zones. The site will feature advanced digital connectivity and an independent water supply.

Renprop, Crookes Brothers’ property arm, was established to convert marginal farmland on the Renishaw estate into a mix of industrial, commercial, and residential developments.

At the heart of the precinct is Renishaw Hills, the flagship residential estate, which currently stands west of the N2 on the hills looking over Scottburgh and the ocean of and occupied 28 of 266 hectares of developable land. To date, 231 units have been completed across six phases, with Phase 7 now launched. Once fully developed, it will comprise over 500 units, appealing to affluent buyers drawn to its coastal lifestyle and 80% conservation ethos. Early investors have already seen property values rise by over 60%.

The multi-billion-rand precinct is now entering its next phase, which includes a shopping centre, service station, private school, and church. Construction has begun on bulk services to support Hampson’s new petrol station, convenience store, and fast-food drive-through at the main entrance on Dududu Road.

By combining conservation, connectivity, and community-focused planning, the Renishaw Coastal Precinct represents the dynamic new heartbeat of the KZN Mid-South Coast, positioning Scottburgh as the region’s next major growth node.

== Notable residents ==
Well-known people associated with Scottburgh include:

- Dr Thomas Chalmers Robertson – world-renowned conservationist and author
- Joel Stransky – former Springbok rugby player
- Tony Pooley – the late conservationist

== See also ==
- Black December
