= Amandawe =

- Township
- Amandawe Mission
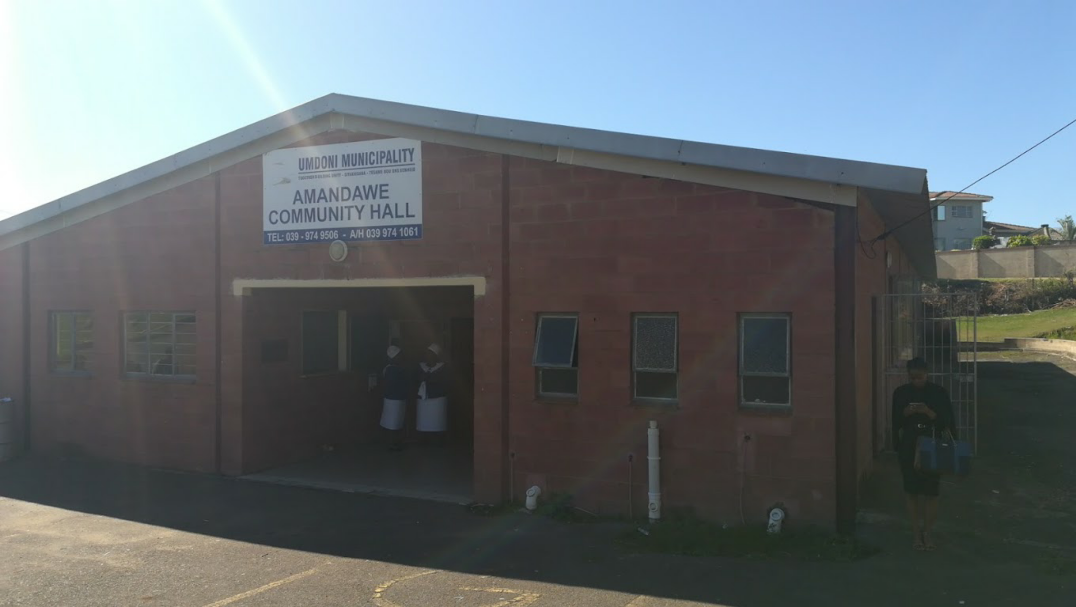
- Community hall at Amandawe Mission
- Motto: Home Sweet Home
- Location within KwaZulu-Natal Location within South Africa Location within Africa
- Coordinates: 30°15′28″S 30°43′5″E
- Country: South Africa
- Province: KwaZulu-Natal Province
- District: Ugu District Municipality
- Municipality: uMdoni Local Municipality
- Established: 1899
- Named for: Ancestry

Government
  - Type: Mayor-council government
  - Mayor: Sibongile Khathi
  - Councilor: Bhekani Cele

Area
  - Total: 6.74 km^{2} (2.60 sq mi)
- Elevation: 125 m (410 ft)

Population (2011)
  - Total: 11,343
  - Density: 366.51/km^{2} (949.3/sq mi)
- Demonym: Amandawean

Racial makeup (2011)
  - Black Africans: 99.74%
  - Indian/Asian: 0.08%
  - Coloured: 0.07%
  - White: 0.04%
  - Other: 0.06%

First languages (2011)
  - Zulu: 94.34%
  - English: 1.70%
  - Xhosa: 0.78%
  - Afrikaans: 0.22%
  - Other: 2.96%
- Time zone: UTC+2 (SAST)
- Postal code (street): 4172
- PO box: 4180
- Area code: 039
- Amandawe was formerly under Vulamehlo Local Municipality

Amandawe (/əˈmændəwɛər/) also known as Amandawe Mission, or often informally abbreviated as A.M.A or A.M is a small township in the KwaZulu-Natal South Coast region of South Africa. The area is mostly populated with Black Africans.

== History ==
Amandawe was a sugarcane farm before developing into a township. An ethnobotanical survey conducted in the area by Ben-Erik van Wyk showed that the use of medicinal plants had remained popular for historical and ancestral reasons thus the town was named for Ancestry. On 19 May 2018, about 1,500 people blocked the P188 road with rocks, trees, and burning tires to protest what they called the abandonment of the township by Umdoni Local Municipality. The township was previously governed by the defunct local municipality, namely Vulamehlo Local Municipality. The Cele Traditional Council also controlled it but is now mostly controlled by white people due to modernisation.

== Etymology ==
Amandawe is a Zulu word relating to the ancestors, because of the community's belief in ancestors.

== Demography ==
Amandawe Population in 2015
2015 Estimate	A.M.A
Total population	11,054
Population change, 1975–2015	+224.2%
Population change, 2000–2015	+38.1%
Population density (people/sqkm)	1,683.79
Female population	5,932
Female population percentage	53.7%
Male population	5,122
Male population percentage	46.3%

The population of Amandawe, as recorded in the 2011 census, was 11,343 people living in 2,469 households.

=== Religion ===
The township has different religions, namely:

- Apostolic Faith Mission of South Africa
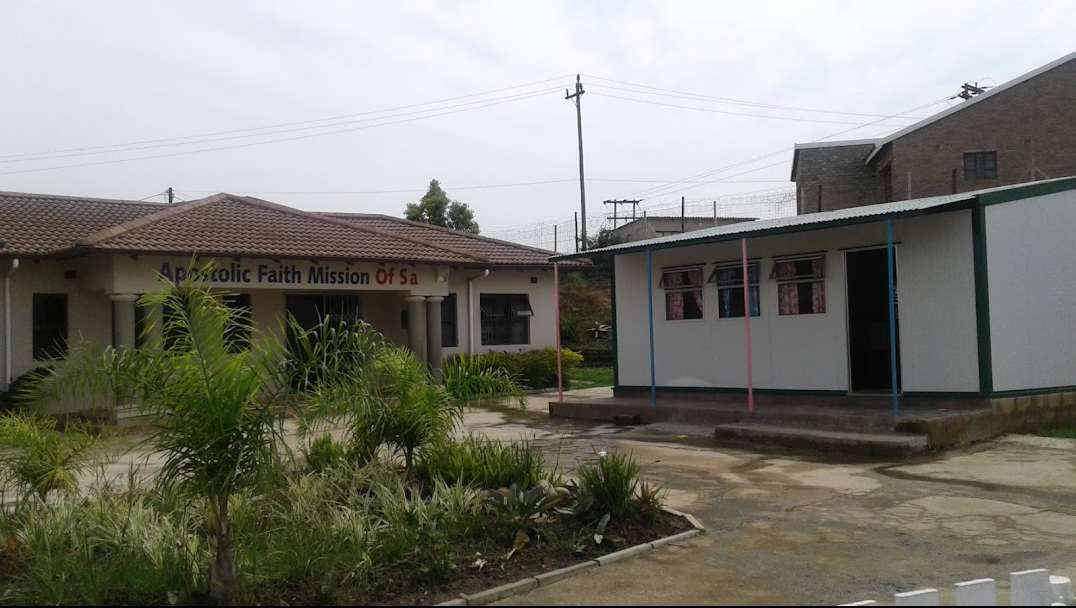
  Apostolic Faith Mission of South Africa at Amandawe Mission
- Assemblies of God
- Roman Catholic Church
- Zion Christian Church

== Geography ==
=== Climate ===
Climate data for Amandawe
Month	Jan	Feb	Mar	Apr	May	Jun	Jul	Aug	Sep	Oct	Nov	Dec	Year

=== Location ===
Amandawe is located 59.5 km (37.0 mi) southwest of the City Of Durban. And also located 71.1 km (44.2 mi) from Port Shepstone the administrative town of the KZN South Coast.

The township is surrounded by neighboring populated areas such as Amahlongwa, Dududu, Freeland Park, KwaCele, Park Rynie, Renishaw Hills, Scottburgh.

=== Wildlife ===
Different plant species are located all over the township. It also has a river named after it called Amandawe River. The township people generally use the plant species in the area to make medicine (muti) to help others or themselves.

The township is known for a number of creatures like brown house snakes, black mambas, spotted bush snakes, Indian mynas and the hadada ibis which is used as an alarm in the morning, but in the township it is said that it brings bad luck.

The vervet monkeys are often cited as pests due to stealing food.

== Media ==
=== Radio ===
Umdoni Community Radio also known as UCR is a nonprofit radio station based at the township. Other famous radio stations such as East Coast Radio, Metro FM, Ukhozi FM can are also listened to due to having a lager media coverage.

=== Newspaper ===
Due to the townships location (KwaZulu-Natal South Coast) newspaper coverage includes South Coast Sun, South Coast Herald, South Coast Fever, Mid South Coast Rising Sun.

== Sports ==
Amandawe is a sport active township mainly on football (Amandawe F.C), netball, and other sports. Most sporting events in the area takes place at Amandawe Sport Ground. The Amandawe League invites teams outside the township to compete in the league such as Alaska F.C, Scottburgh F.C (The Amigos), Pholas F.C, New Age F.C, etc.

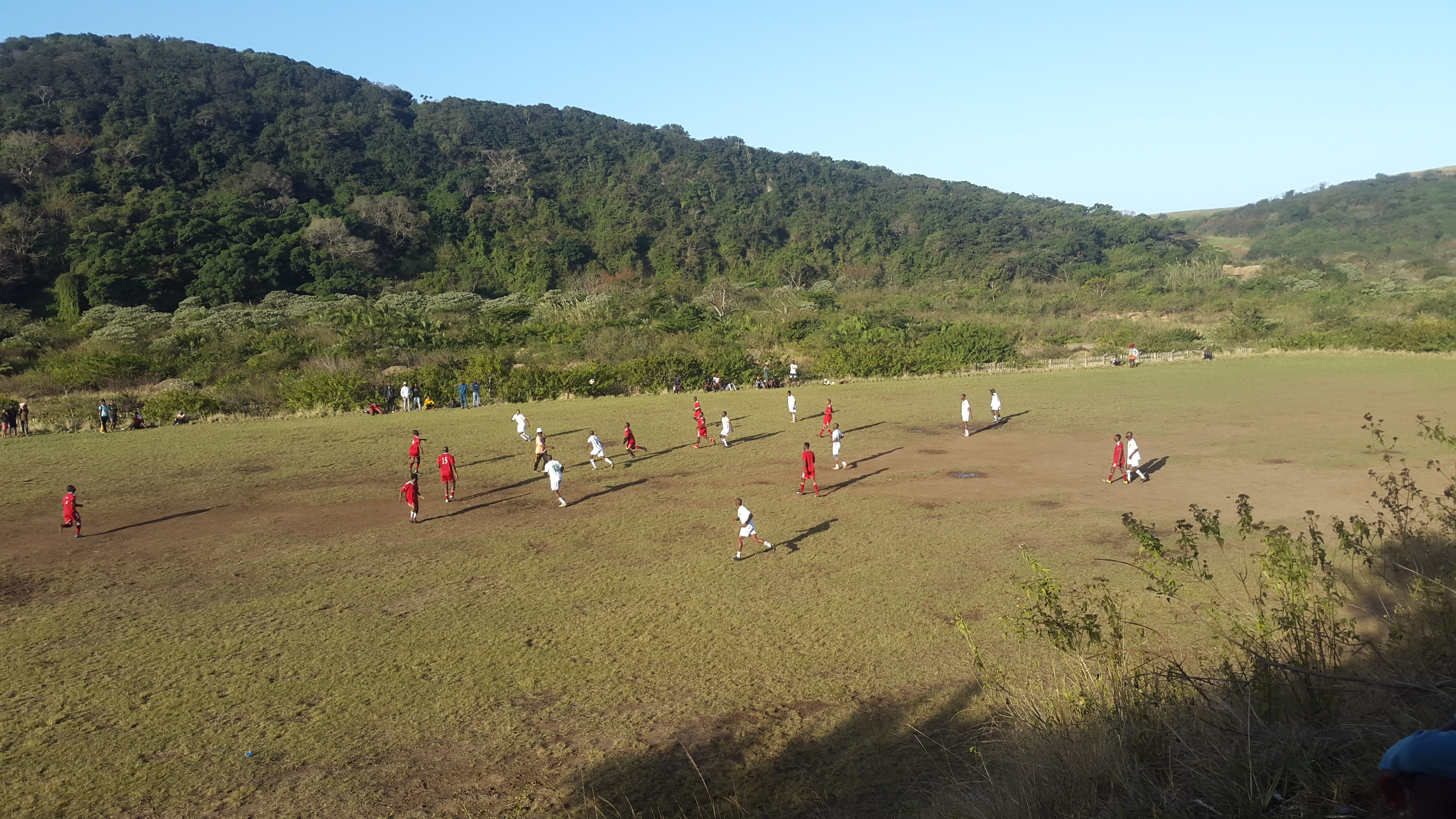
Local teams playing soccer at Amandawe Mission Sport Ground

== Economy ==
The economy of the township is still thriving through the small local businesses in the area. The citizens depend on the neighboring towns, Scottburgh, Umzinto and Umkomaas for water and sanitation, health, police, and other services, because infrastructural development in the township is very slow.

=== Retail ===
Retail service in the township includes retail stores such as:

- Boxer Punch (defunct)
- Boxer Build (defunct)
- Amandawe Mini Market
- Amandawe Hardware
- Amandawe Trading Store
- Amandawe Liquor
- And small Foreign shops all around the township

== Transport ==
=== Road ===
The P188 also known as Dududu Rd runs through the township from Freeland Park to western central of Amandawe, it has a length of 3.98 km. The road connects the R102 and P197-3.

The N2 bypasses under the bridge of P188. Access to the township from N2 can be acquired from the P188 Interchange (Exit 110).

The P197-3 passes through the township providing access to Amahlongwa when turning right, it also provides access to Dududu and Umzinto when turning left.

=== Air ===
The Margate Airport is the closest to the township with a distance of 86.0 km (53.4 mi) and King Shaka International Airport which has a distance of 91.1 km (56.6 mi).

== Education ==
The township has 3 school and a number of pre-schools, such as :

- Amagcino Crèche
- Amandawe Junior Primary
- Amandawe Youth Care Centre
- Amahlashana Senior Primary
- Edwaleni Care Center
- Gugulesizwe High School

== Crime and safety ==
Murder rate in the township is at its peak as taxi wars, rape, gang wars, and burglaries keep on escalating.

Wars often occur within the township due to different divisions in the township and also other neighboring areas, where these wars date back to the 1960s during the South African Border War

== Notable people ==
- Maseru Madlala - an entrepreneur.
- Marcia Mandisi Mabaso - a Radio personality.

== See also ==
- KwaZulu-Natal South Coast
- Umdoni Local Municipality
