= Nkwifa =

- Location within KwaZulu-Natal Location within South Africa
- Coordinates: 30.321°S 30.608°E
- Country: South Africa
- Province: KwaZulu-Natal
- District: Ugu
- Municipality: Umdoni
- Time zone: UTC+2 (SAST)

Nkwifa is a settlement some 5 km west of Umzinto. Named after the Nkwifa River which flows past it. Derived from Zulu, the name means 'the spewing one', referring to the waterfall.
