= Vulamehlo Local Municipality =

Vulamehlo
- Local municipality
- Seal

- Location of Vulamehlo Local Municipality within KwaZulu-Natal
- Coordinates: 30°13′S 30°36′E
- Country: South Africa
- Province: KwaZulu-Natal
- District: Ugu
- Seat: Scottburgh
- Wards: 10

Government
  - Type: Municipal council
  - Mayor: W.T. Dube

Area
  - Total: 960 km^{2} (370 sq mi)

Population (2011)
  - Total: 77,403
  - Density: 81/km^{2} (210/sq mi)

Racial makeup (2011)
  - Black African: 98.9%
  - Coloured: 0.2%
  - Indian/Asian: 0.5%
  - White: 0.3%

First languages (2011)
  - Zulu: 94.6%
  - English: 1.7%
  - Southern Ndebele: 1.3%
  - Other: 2.4%
- Time zone: UTC+2 (SAST)
- Municipal code: KZN211

Vulamehlo Local Municipality was a local municipality in Ugu District Municipality, KwaZulu-Natal. It was located south of the eThekwini municipality and bordered by uMdoni to the east, Mkhambathini and Richmond to the north and Ubuhlebezwe to the west. There is an almost equal split of land between commercial agriculture and traditional settlement areas. 48% of the area is held under communal ownership through traditional authorities; the balance of the area is privately owned, except for Vernon Crookes Nature Reserve, which is managed by Ezemvelo KZN Wildlife. In 2016 the municipality was divided between eThekwini and uMdoni.

== Topography ==
The municipality was characterised by sharp valleys, river systems, and hilly, broken terrain. Approximately 30% of the area was estimated to contain slopes of 1:3 and steeper. The fragmented and steep topography had limited development and agricultural production, and had greatly contributed to the dispersed nature of the area's settlement patterns.

The major river systems within the area were the uMkhomazi, Mpambanyoni and Mthwalume rivers. The other perennial rivers which flow through Vulamehlo included the Nungwane River, Lovu River, Msimbazi River, Mzimayi River, uMzinto and Mkhumbane rivers.

== Economy and infrastructure ==
The Vulamehlo Municipality was largely made up of traditional settlements and was characterised by limited economic activity. The area has high levels of unemployment, with many of those who are employed commuting long distances to other economic centres such as Durban, Port Shepstone, Ixopo, Pietermaritzburg and Johannesburg.

The main sources of income and economic activities in the municipality include subsistence farming and commercial agriculture, including the production of sugarcane and timber plantation. Small-scale sugarcane growers tend to cluster around Dududu, Kenterton and Mfume.

The dispersed, low-density settlement pattern has made the provision of physical and social infrastructure (roads, water, electricity, clinics, schools, and police stations) relatively difficult and expensive. The network of roads connecting the area's settlements is generally poor. The area of former Vulamehlo Municipality is one of the localities within the Ugu District that is hardest hit by high unemployment levels, poverty, and negative economic growth rate.

== Main places ==
The 2001 census divided the municipality into the following main places:

Place	Code	Area (km^{2})	Population
Cele	50101	22.43	4,682
Emandleni	50102	60.83	10,606
Ezembeni	50103	86.46	13,462
Isimahla	50104	66.40	5,291
Izimpethu Endlovu	50105	14.78	1,104
Izimpethu Zendlovu & EM	50106	15.97	5,619
Mapumulo	50107	44.86	6,200
Mbhele	50108	49.52	3,725
Nyuswa	50109	16.96	1,892
Qiko	50110	49.16	3,074
Thoyana	50111	104.87	14,637
Ukuthula	50112	8.11	2,090
Umzinto	50113	36.06	6,397
Remainder of the municipality	50114	395.50	4,272

== Politics ==
The municipal council consisted of twenty members elected by mixed-member proportional representation. Ten councillors were elected by first-past-the-post voting in ten wards, while the remaining ten were chosen from party lists so that the total number of party representatives was proportional to the number of votes received. In the election of 18 May 2011 the African National Congress (ANC) won a majority of thirteen seats on the council. The following table shows the results of the election.

Party	Votes				Seats		
Party	Ward	List	Total	%	Ward	List	Total
ANC	15,281	15,614	30,895	63.6	9	4	13
NFP	6,325	6,039	12,364	25.4	1	4	5
IFP	2,488	2,463	4,951	10.2	0	2	2
ACDP	195	202	397	0.8	0	0	0
Total	24,289	24,318	48,607	100.0	10	10	20
Spoilt votes	510	515	1,025				

=== Maladministration ===
As of 2016, the municipality was ranked as the second-worst in KwaZulu-Natal, and the fifth-worst in the country according to the Good Governance Survey.
