= Vulamehlo Local Municipality elections =

Local elections in KwaZulu-Natal, South Africa

The Vulamehlo Local Municipality council consisted of twenty members elected by mixed-member proportional representation. Ten councillors were elected by first-past-the-post voting in ten wards, while the remaining ten were chosen from party lists so that the total number of party representatives was proportional to the number of votes received. In the election of 18 May 2011 the African National Congress (ANC) won a majority of thirteen seats on the council.

In 2016 the municipality was divided between eThekwini and uMdoni.

== Results ==
The following table shows the composition of the council after past elections.

Event	ANC	IFP	NFP	Other	Total
2000 election	7	13	—	—	20
2006 election	11	9	—	—	20
2011 election	13	2	5	0	20

== December 2000 election ==
The following table shows the results of the 2000 election.

Party	Ward			List			Total seats
Party	Votes	%	Seats	Votes	%	Seats	Total seats
Inkatha Freedom Party	9,717	62.55	8	9,896	63.69	5	13
African National Congress	5,818	37.45	2	5,642	36.31	5	7
Total	15,535	100.00	10	15,538	100.00	10	20
Valid votes	15,535	97.61		15,538	97.69		
Invalid/blank votes	380	2.39		367	2.31		
Total votes	15,915	100.00		15,905	100.00		
Registered voters/turnout	33,000	48.23		33,000	48.20		

== March 2006 election ==
The following table shows the results of the 2006 election.

Party	Ward			List			Total seats
Party	Votes	%	Seats	Votes	%	Seats	Total seats
African National Congress	9,844	53.38	7	9,962	54.04	4	11
Inkatha Freedom Party	8,596	46.62	3	8,473	45.96	6	9
Total	18,440	100.00	10	18,435	100.00	10	20
Valid votes	18,440	97.18		18,435	97.12		
Invalid/blank votes	536	2.82		546	2.88		
Total votes	18,976	100.00		18,981	100.00		
Registered voters/turnout	35,840	52.95		35,840	52.96		

== May 2011 election ==
The following table shows the results of the 2011 election.

Party	Ward			List			Total seats
Party	Votes	%	Seats	Votes	%	Seats	Total seats
African National Congress	15,281	62.91	9	15,614	64.21	4	13
National Freedom Party	6,325	26.04	1	6,039	24.83	4	5
Inkatha Freedom Party	2,488	10.24	0	2,463	10.13	2	2
African Christian Democratic Party	195	0.80	0	202	0.83	0	0
Total	24,289	100.00	10	24,318	100.00	10	20
Valid votes	24,289	97.94		24,318	97.93		
Invalid/blank votes	510	2.06		515	2.07		
Total votes	24,799	100.00		24,833	100.00		
Registered voters/turnout	37,839	65.54		37,839	65.63		
