= Sardine run =

Annual fish migration off the shores of South Africa

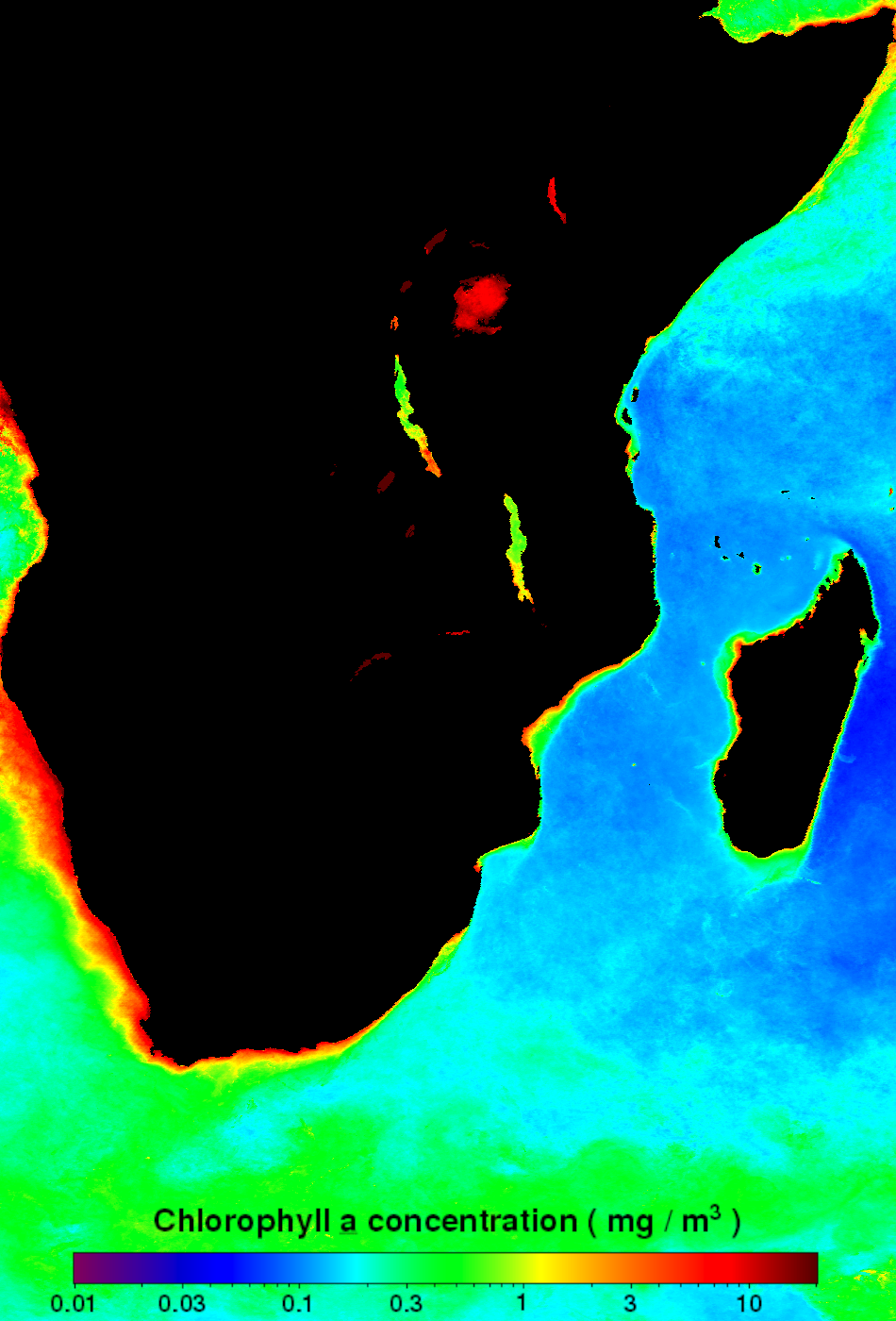
NASA map of the Agulhas Current showing the levels of primary production during 2009. This is a measure of how much food was available for the spawning sardines.

The KwaZulu-Natal sardine run of southern Africa occurs from May through July when billions of sardines – or more specifically the Southern African pilchard Sardinops sagax – spawn in the cool waters of the Agulhas Bank and move northward along the east coast of South Africa. Their sheer numbers create a feeding frenzy along the coastline. The run, containing millions of individual sardines, occurs when a current of cold water heads north from the Agulhas Bank up to Mozambique. Fisherman are sometimes observed singing songs while hauling in the fishing nets in typical South African style. It is estimated that the sardine run is the biggest Biomass migration in terms of numbers.

In terms of biomass, researchers estimate the sardine run could rival East Africa's great wildebeest migration. However, little is known about the phenomenon. It is believed that the water temperature has to drop below 21 °C in order for the migration to take place. In 2003, the sardines failed to 'run' for the third time in 23 years. While 2005 saw a good run, 2006 marked another non-run.

The shoals are often more than 7 km long, 1.5 km wide and 30 metres deep and are clearly visible from spotter planes or from the surface.

Sardines group together when they are threatened. This instinctual behaviour is a defence mechanism, as lone individuals are more likely to be eaten than when in large groups.

== Causes ==
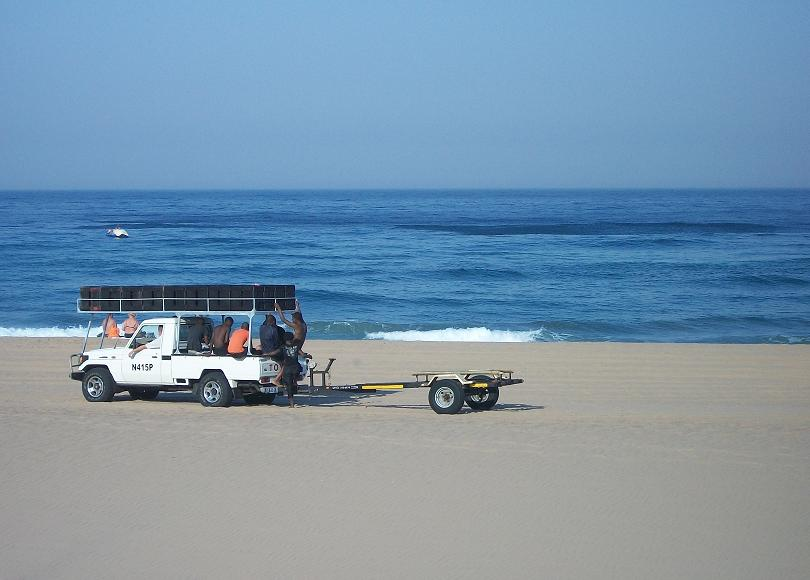
Netting a shoal of sardines (dark patch in the water)

The sardine run is still poorly understood from an ecological point of view. There have been various hypotheses, sometimes contradictory, that try to explain why and how the run occurs.

A recent interpretation of the causes is that the sardine run is most likely a seasonal reproductive migration of a genetically distinct subpopulation of sardine that moves along the coast from the eastern Agulhas Bank to the coast of KwaZulu-Natal in most years if not in every year.

Genomic and transcriptomic data indicate that the sardines participating in the run originate from South Africa's cool-temperate Atlantic coast. These are attracted to temporary cold-water upwelling off the south-east coast, and eventually find themselves trapped in subtropical habitat that is too warm for them.

The migration is restricted to the inshore waters by the preference of sardine for cooler water and the strong and warm offshore Agulhas Current, which flows in the opposite direction to the migration, and is strongest just off the continental shelf. A band of cooler coastal water and the occurrence of Natal Pulses and break-away eddies make it possible for sardine shoals to overcome their habitat constraints. The importance of these enabling factors is greatest where the continental shelf is narrowest.

The presence of eggs off the KwaZulu-Natal coast suggests that sardine stay there for several months and their return migration during late winter to spring is nearly always unnoticeable because it probably occurs at depths where the water is cooler than at the surface.

In some years there does not appear to be a sardine run. This may be because it is not detected by coastal observers either because it actually does not occur due to high water temperatures and/or other hydrographic barriers, or the migration may occur farther offshore and possibly deeper due to unusual conditions.

== Oceanographic influences ==
Sardine prefer water temperatures between 14 and 20 °C. Each southern winter the nearshore sea temperature along the South African south east coast drops to within this range. Along the KwaZulu-Natal coast, sardine may be found in water warmer than 20 °C. It was hypothesized that factors beside temperature may influence the movement of sardine along the KwaZulu-Natal coastline, One of these factors may be predation pressure.

=== Oceanographic regions of the KwaZulu-Natal coast ===
The KwaZulu-Natal coast includes varied oceanographic regions, each influenced by distinct environmental forces.

- The continental shelf waters of the KwaZulu-Natal Mid to Lower South coasts are dominated by the warm Agulhas Current which flows toward the south west. This water has a mean winter temperature of 23 °C and the current speed is often more than 1 m/s within 5 km of the coast.
- The Agulhas Current follows a very constant path. The main stream is just offshore of the continental shelf break most of the time, which suggests that conditions are normally unsuitable for sardines along that part of the coast.
- Local winds do not appear to have much effect on the currents.
- Sardine move closer to shore as they travel northwards along the coast, but it is not known whether this is due to environmental conditions or biological conditions.
- There is a persistent cyclonic gyre known as the Durban Eddy, where warm Agulhas Current water flows onto the shelf and the resulting inshore current direction is from south to north. This section of coast may be considered a transition from the wind-dominated section of the continental shelf to the north, to the Agulhas Current dominated section of shelf to the south.
- The North Coast section of continental shelf is considerably wider (>40 km) than that of the south coast (roughly 15 km). This causes the Agulhas Current to flow farther offshore, and current conditions over the shelf are more variable. Wind appears to be a dominant influence in the region. Longshore north-easterly or south-westerly winds precede currents of similar direction by roughly 18 hours. Sea temperature is often lower and nutrients higher than along the South Coast.
- The North Coast would seem to be more suitable habitat for sardine, but it is not known to what extent they use it.

These distinct regions may affect sardine distribution and movement.

=== Oceanographic variables and sardine presence ===
Some oceanographic variables have been found useful for describing conditions influencing sardine presence.

- Water temperature has an inverse and highly significant influence. This is consistent with the preferred temperature range of sardine.
- Sea currents have a significant effect, with calm current conditions most favourable for sardine presence and moderate current speeds from north to south most detrimental. As sardine movement during the run is northwards, this counter-current effect is expected.

Other conditions associated with sardine presence are:

- Increasing atmospheric pressure: sardine presence appears to be higher during periods between the cold fronts along the KwaZulu-Natal coast. These periods have calm atmospheric conditions and slow nearshore currents.
- Large swells and low water clarity associated with cold fronts have a negative effect on sardine presence.
- Wind direction, wind speed, current direction, air temperature and rainfall all significantly affect sea surface temperature and consequently sardine presence. *Current and wind direction effects dominated, with north-easterly wind and currents from north to south resulting in cooler sea surface temperatures.
- North-easterly winds cause the surface water layer to move away from shore (Ekman veering), allowing the cool water to reach the surface, and south-westerly winds push warm Agulhas Current surface water towards the shore causing inshore temperatures to increase, which would negatively impact upon sardine presence.
- Increasing maximum air temperature, south-easterly (onshore) winds, wind speeds in excess of 6 m/s, and rainfall, all result in warmer sea surface temperatures.
- Strong south-easterly winds and rainfall are associated with the passage of frontal systems, which would push warm surface waters shoreward resulting in warmer sea surface temperatures.
- Frequent light north-westerly land breezes: When north-westerly land breezes are the strongest winds of the day they have a cooling effect on sea surface temperature. This cooling should be greatest in the vicinity of the surf zone where mixing is most effective. Sardine are often sighted close inshore during early mornings, suggesting that they could be attracted by cooler conditions found there.

==== Summary: Oceanographic predictors of sardine presence ====
Favourable:

- Decreasing sea surface temperature
- Calm current conditions
- Light north-westerly land breezes
- Stable atmospheric conditions.

Unfavourable:

- Increasing sea surface temperature
- Moderate north to south currents
- Large swells
- Turbid water

North-easterly and north-westerly winds and north to south currents have a cooling effect upon nearshore sea surface temperatures, but south-easterly winds and increasing air temperatures cause nearshore sea surface temperature warming.

== Predators ==
External image
- Images of the sardine run

Dolphins (estimated as being up to 18,000 in number, mostly the common dolphin (Delphinus capensis)) are largely responsible for rounding up the sardines into bait balls. These bait balls can be 10–20 metres in diameter and extend to a depth of 10 metres. The bait balls are short lived and seldom last longer than 10 minutes. Once the sardines are rounded up, sharks (primarily the bronze whaler), and birds (like the Cape gannet), and Bryde's whales take advantage of the opportunity. Other whale species, regardless of whether they do or not join the run, may appear in the vicinity such as humpback, southern right, and minke whales.

=== Predators as predictors of sardine presence ===
The Cape gannet is the predator species most closely associated with sardine presence along the Eastern Cape and KwaZulu-Natal coastline and is the most useful indicator of sardine run activity.

Sharks and large gamefish presence is also strongly associated with sardine presence during the run, but as they are not as easily observed from the surface they are not as useful a predictor of sardine presence.

The presence of common dolphins inshore along the east coast during winter is significantly associated with sardine presence, and the common dolphin can be considered the third most useful species for predicting sardine presence.

The resident population of bottlenose dolphin does not appear to associate with the sardine run, whereas the migrant stock does. This may explain why the bottlenose dolphin is less likely to predict sardine presence.

=== Record of predators ===
2005 records: In June and July 2005 the avian and mammal predators included Bryde's whale (Balaenoptera edeni), African penguin (Spheniscus demersus), Cape cormorant (Phalacrocorax capensis), which were predominantly found in the cooler southern part of the region. Peak sardine run activity occurred within 4 km of shore at the northward limit of a strip of cool water (<21 °C) stretching along the East Coast. The principal predators at this stage were common dolphins (Delphinus capensis) and Cape gannets (Morus capensis).

== Economic importance ==
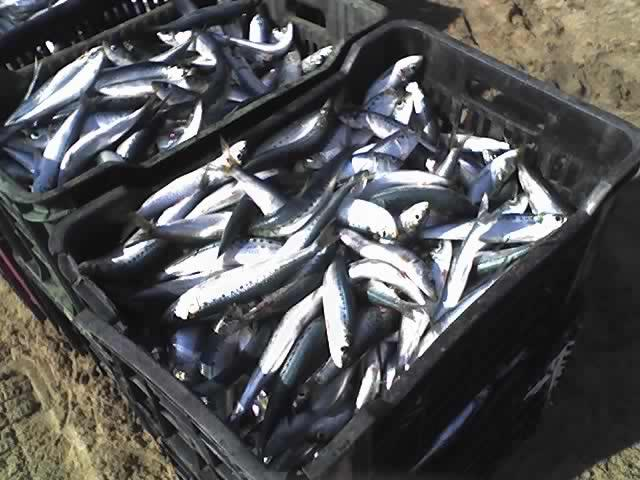
Sardines caught off Amanzimtoti, South Africa

=== Tourism ===
The recent interest in the sardine run has had significant impact on the local economy. International and domestic divers join local tour operators on sardine run diving expeditions. Such expeditions run from Eastern Cape towns, including East London, Port Saint Johns, and Port Elizabeth. The run has become important to tourism and is considered to be one of the main attractions in KwaZulu-Natal during the winter holiday period. Both local and international tourists are attracted to the spectacle and are provided with opportunities to participate in activities such as dive charters and boat based predator viewing tours. The KwaZulu-Natal Sharks Board and East Coast Radio, facilitate a 'Sardine Run Hotline', which provides information on the position and movement of sardine shoals. Information is also provided on the internet.

The Sardine Run Association (www.thesardinerunassociation.org) has been formed to provide a link between tour operators, tourists, non-governmental organisations, scientists, and local and national governments.

=== Fishery ===
The sardine run also supports a small-scale, seasonal beach seine fishery.

== Threats to the sardine run ==
Climate change and overfishing have caused yearly stocks to dwindle, putting endangered species such as the African penguin, Cape cormorant, Cape gannet, and school shark (whose diets consist mainly of sardines) at greater risk of extinction. As the sardines move along a channel of cold water, warming waters could cause the sardine run to cease to exist within a few decades.

== History ==
The oldest known record of the run is a mention in the Natal Mercury newspaper of 4 August 1853. More recently, the run has been the subject of natural history documentaries (e.g., the BBC's Nature's Great Events) and printed popular media (e.g., National Geographic).

=== The 2011 run ===
Pilot shoals were netted at Hibberdene on 20 June 2011, while the main shoal was sighted near Port St. Johns. Small pockets of sardines were seen between Mfazazana and Margate. About 25 crates of sardines were hauled out from the first netting at Hibberdene. A further 33 crates of sardines were netted and were sold at R700 per crate or R30 per dozen sardines. The 58 crates were sold "within minutes". An attempt was also made to net sardines at Banana Beach. About 500 common dolphins and numerous sharks were noted near Margate. Shark nets had been removed between Umgababa and Port Edward.

Sardines were netted at Park Rynie on 21 June 2011. Some large nets of 200–300 baskets of sardines were taken. The baskets sold at R600 each. A large gathering of sardine predators was seen off Port Grosvenor on the Wild Coast. Thousands of Cape gannets and dolphins were seen in a continuous line of about 6 km between Brazen Head and just north of the Umtata River. It is suspected that this year's shoal is "massive", and will produce a "bumper run". Shark nets have been removed to the south of Durban. The first shoals were expected to reach Amanzimtoti on 23 June 2011. The main shoal was still near Port St Johns.

On 22 June 2011, a "few" baskets were netted at Umgababa beach, and a "handful" of baskets were netted at Warner Beach in the afternoon. Sardines were also netted at Isipingo, where 14 baskets were hauled out. The sardines therefore reached the Amanzimtoti area a day earlier than predicted.

Rough seas (with waves up to 4.7 m) caused by strong winds associated with a cold front kept the sardines from the shore on 23 June 2011. Pockets of sardines were seen far out to sea off the Bluff. The rough water and far distance of the sardines from shore made it impossible for the fish to be netted. No dolphin or bird activity was seen in the Durban area associated with the sardines. The main shoal was still suspected to be off the Eastern Cape coastline, with a report of some sardines still seen near Port St Johns on 22 and 23 June 2011.

Durban beaches were the scene of most netting activity on 27 June 2011. "Hundreds of baskets" of sardines were hauled onto the beaches in 13 nets. The price per basket was R350 in the morning, but later in the afternoon the price had dropped to R120 per basket. Each net contained in excess of 300 baskets of sardines, with one net containing around 500 baskets. Sardines were also netted at Umhlanga, Port Shepstone, Margate, Umgababa, and Port Edward. Cape gannets and other seabirds were seen "plunging from considerable heights" to catch the sardines, especially on the South Coast. Most of the sardines were netted along the Durban beaches as this was the area of calmest waters; Swells along the KwaZulu-Natal coastline were around 2.5 m. Shark nets had been removed from Salt Rock to Port Edward, and bathers were requested to consult with lifeguards before entering the water. Meanwhile, a baby dolphin washed up on the beach at Scottburgh, with a gash behind its "flipper" (the photo showed a gash between the dorsal fin and the tail) that exposed the spine. The "weeks old" dolphin was taken to a nearby paddling pool, but authorities later euthanased it due to the severity of the injuries. Speculation was that the dolphin had been injured by a shark, or by a boat propeller; possibly related to the sardine run.

Swells dropped to 1–1.5 m on 28 June 2011, allowing more netting of sardines. Sardines were netted at Amanzimtoti; on the main beach and at Chain Rocks. A 22-year-old American marine biology student (research diver) named Paulo Edward Stanchi was attacked by a large dusky shark while diving at Aliwal Shoal Marine Protected Area. The group of divers had encountered a pocket of sardines when a 3 m long dusky shark bit Mr Stanchi on his left leg and hands. Mr Stanchi managed to free himself from the shark, and was treated on the diving boat before being transported to Rocky Bay, where medics stabilised him. He was then airlifted to Nkosi Albert Luthuli Hospital, where he underwent surgery. Dusky sharks generally live offshore, but come closer to the shore during the sardine run. The annual sardine run allowed more dusky sharks in the Aliwal Shoal MPA than usual, but there was no reason for them to show any more interest in divers than usual. Mr Stanchi had been wearing split fins with black and grey stripes, and this may have looked like a small shoal of fish to the shark. Meanwhile, a woman in her 40s broke her leg in the frenzy at Amanzimtoti when the sardines were netted. The woman is believed to have been trying to get some of the sardines when she "stepped wrong" and fractured her leg. Paramedics stabilized her before transporting her to hospital.

5 July 2011 was a "quiet day" for the sardine run. "Plenty of birds" were seen diving at Karridene close to the shore. 50 crates of sardines were taken at Umgababa in the early afternoon, while a net of sardines pulled in at Karridene contained some Garrick. More Garrick were caught by fishermen at Karridene, but in general there was little other game fish activity. There was reported to be a "massive shoal" of sardines off Coffee Bay in the Eastern Cape.

On 15 July 2011, 100 baskets were netted at Pennington. It was difficult to predict the sardines' movements as they were staying offshore.

On 20 July 2011, 300 baskets of sardines were netted at Pennington in the morning. There were many gannets off Ballito, and "quite a bit of fish" between Park Rynie and Mtwalume.

A strong cold front hit South Africa towards the end of July, causing land surface temperatures to drop below 10 °C over much of the country. Heavy snow falls were experienced in high lying areas, including Nottingham Road, Mooi River and Newcastle in the Midlands, while Van Reenen's Pass was snowed in. The cold front caused swells of up to 4 meters on the KwaZulu-Natal coast and a 25 to 30 knot wind with rough sea conditions. A ship called the Phoenix ran aground at Salt Rock, Ballito on 26 July 2011 because of the rough conditions. This cold front may have put an end to the 2011 Sardine Run.

=== The 2023 run ===
The 2023 run has been estimated as being the biggest on observed records to date.

== See also ==
- Agulhas Current
- Fish migration
- Forage fish
- Salmon run
- Shoaling and schooling
- The Blue Planet
- Wild Ocean (film)
