= Bazley, South Africa =

Bazley
- Location within KwaZulu-Natal Location within South Africa
- Coordinates: 30°26′0″S 30°39′0″E
- Country: South Africa
- Province: KwaZulu-Natal
- District: Ugu
- Municipality: Umdoni

Area
  - Total: 1.65 km^{2} (0.64 sq mi)

Population (2011)
  - Total: 268
  - Density: 162/km^{2} (421/sq mi)

Racial makeup (2011)
  - Black African: 32.0%
  - Coloured: 1.5%
  - White: 66.5%

First languages (2011)
  - English: 61.9%
  - Zulu: 23.5%
  - Afrikaans: 6.7%
  - Xhosa: 5.2%
  - Other: 2.6%
- Time zone: UTC+2 (SAST)

Bazley or Bazley Beach is a residential beach town along the KwaZulu-Natal South Coast, south of Durban.

It was named after John Bazley, an engineer and Byrne Settler whose son William successfully opened the Mzimkulu River mouth for shipping in the 1880s, at the place now known as Port Shepstone. John Bazley first arrived in the area in 1859 and set up camp on the banks of the Ifafa River. After a fairly good start, his farming activities grew and he was granted 612 acres (250 ha) of land for sugar farming. Bazelybworked hard and prospered, and within two years, he had established a sugar mill.

Today, Bazley has been described as relaxing and scenic, and has been deemed a popular tourist attraction..It is only accessible from the Sezela motorway turn-off.
