= Mathulini =

- Location within KwaZulu-Natal Location within South Africa
- Coordinates: 30.541°S 30.595°E
- Country: South Africa
- Province: KwaZulu-Natal
- District: Ugu
- Municipality: Umzumbe

Area
  - Total: 4.91 km^{2} (1.90 sq mi)

Population (2011)
  - Total: 8,335
  - Density: 1,700/km^{2} (4,400/sq mi)

Racial makeup (2011)
  - Black African: 87.1%
  - Coloured: 0.2%
  - Indian/Asian: 0.7%
  - White: 1%
  - Foreigners (immigrants): 11%

First languages (2011)
  - Zulu: 95.6%
  - Other: 4.4%
- Time zone: UTC+2 (SAST)

Mathulini is a town in Umzumbe Local Municipality in the KwaZulu-Natal province of South Africa.
