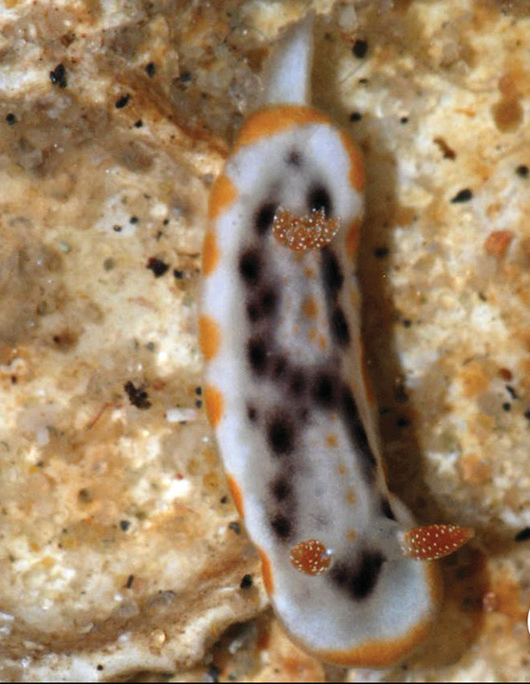

Scientific classification
- Kingdom: Animalia
- Phylum: Mollusca
- Class: Gastropoda
- Order: Nudibranchia
- Family: Chromodorididae
- Genus: Goniobranchus
- Species: G. pruna

Binomial name
- Goniobranchus pruna (Gosliner, 1994)

Synonyms
- Chromodoris pruna Gosliner, 1994 (basionym)

= Goniobranchus pruna =

Species of gastropod

Goniobranchus pruna is a species of sea slug, a dorid nudibranch, a marine gastropod mollusc in the family Chromodorididae.

== Distribution ==
This species was described from two specimens measuring 6 mm (0.24 in) and 4 mm (0.16 in) found at Nosy Tanikely, Madagascar and Park Rynie, Natal, South Africa. It has been reported from Nosy Bé, Madagascar.

== Description ==
The mantle of Goniobranchus pruna is mostly light grey, with dark plum or black spots and a broad white band at the margin overlain with large round orange spots at regular intervals. Individuals of 15 mm (0.59 in) may develop a patch of cream with brown spots behind the rhinophores and just in front of the gill circlet. The rhinophores and gills are translucent with some orange pigment and small white spots.
