= KwaCele =

Village in KwaZulu-Natal

- Village
- KwaCele
- Location within KwaZulu-Natal Location within South Africa Location within Africa
- Coordinates: 30.2525°S 30.6900°E
- Country: South Africa
- Province: KwaZulu-Natal
- District: Ugu District Municipality
- Municipality: Umdoni Local Municipality
- Named after: Cele Tribe

Government
  - Type: Mayor-council government
- Elevation: 527 m (1,729 ft)

Population (2011)
  - Total: 4,252
- Time zone: UTC+2 (SAST)
- Postal code (street): 4180
- PO box: 4180
- Area code: 039

KwaCele is a small village located on the south coast region of KwaZulu-Natal, South Africa. The village is run by the chief of the Cele Traditional Council.

== Demography ==
In 2011, the population of the village was recorded as 4,252 in an area of 1.728 km.

== Geography ==
The village is located on the South Coast region of KwaZulu-Natal, with neighboring township such as Amahlongwa, Amandawe, Dududu, Umzinto.

== Education ==
In the village there is a large number of primary schools namely:

- Celokuhle Junior Primary
- Shonkweni Junior primary
- Amacebo primary school
