= Renishaw Coastal Precinct =

Renishaw Coastal Preceinct
Project
- Opening date: 2016
- Size: 1,300 hectares (3,200 acres)
- Developer: Renishaw Property Developments, a subsidiary of Crookes Brothers Ltd
- Operator: Inyoni Homes | R&M Construction | Gridvist Construction | PDM Construction
- Owner: Barto van Der Merwe, Managing Director of Renishaw Property Developments
- Website: www.renishaw.co.za

Location
- Location within South Africa
- Coordinates: 30.2756°S 30.7386°E
- Location: Renishaw Coastal Precinct, Scottburgh, KwaZulu-Natal South Coast, South Africa

Renishaw Coastal Precinct is a 1,300-hectare mixed-use development, between Scottburgh and Umkomaas in KwaZulu-Natal, backed by the Renishaw Property Developments, a subsidiary of the JSE-listed agricultural group Crookes Brothers, and its property development partner Crocker Properties. Renishaw Coastal Precinct has an anticipated spend more than R15 billion upon completion.

Construction started in 2016 with Renishaw Hills, the first development of the Precinct, located within Node 1 of the 5 interconnected Nodes.

A significant portion of Renishaw Coastal Precinct falls under uMdoni Local Municipality, which, alongside the KZN Department of Environmental Affairs and the National Department of Agriculture, gave the go-ahead for this mixed-use development that includes residential, retail, educational, healthcare and light industrial/commercial zones.

In total, 1,308 hectares were approved for rezoning, with 266 hectares comprising developable land, the balance will over time be converted from sugarcane to wetlands and coastal forests. The Developer is in the process of donating 142 hectares of adjacent land to the local community through the KwaCele Tribal Council (KTC).

Renishaw Coastal Precinct forms part of the South African Economic Reconstruction and Recovery Plan, announced at the 5th South African Investment Conference (SAIC).

== Developments ==
=== Renishaw Hills ===
Renishaw Hills is a 28-hectare mature lifestyle estate for over 50s on the KwaZulu-Natal South Coast, located within Renishaw Coastal Precinct. Renishaw Hills has built 231 units to date, housing approximately 350 residents. Phases 1 to 6 has been sold out, with Phase 7 being constructed at present. 10 of the 32 units within this Phase has been sold to date.

Once fully developed, Renishaw Hills will have more than 500 units.

=== Restilridge Farm Estate ===
The second residential property development within Renishaw Coastal Precinct is Restilridge Farm Estate, which is set to launch in 2026. This development will combine coastal and farm living, with modern-style Natal farmhouses and large plots.

=== Future developments ===
In June 2025, South Coast Tourism & Investment Enterprise signed a Memorandum of Understanding (MoU) with three property developments, including Renishaw Coastal Precinct. This is a strategic collaboration to maximise the tourist and investment potential of these estates.

==== Shopping centre ====
Renishaw Coastal Precinct will include a 14,000 m^{2} shopping centre developed by Cubisol Property Fund, with mixed-use zoning allowing for a residential component above ground level.

==== Petrol filling station and convenience centre ====
A petrol filling station, convenience store, and possibly a fast-food drive-through will be developed at the main Renishaw entrance circle on Dududu Road by Hampsons, a family-owned business with nearly a century of service in Scottburgh.

==== Eastern seaboard development ====
The Department of Trade Industry and Competition (DTIC) has included Renishaw Coastal Precinct into the Eastern Seaboard Development initiative. This initiative, which extends along the largely underdeveloped 600km coastal stretch between Buffalo City, in the Eastern Cape and eThekwini Metro, in KwaZulu-Natal, aims to leverage the underdeveloped coastlines to attract domestic and international tourists.

==== Further developments ====
Negotiations are underway for a private school, medical centre, hotel, and additional recreational amenities. Renishaw Coastal Precinct will be self-reliant, providing water and sanitation, refuse removal, road maintenance, security, and fibre optics.

== Conservation ==
Only 20% of Renishaw Coastal Precinct will be developed, with the remaining 80% transformed into a conservation area. The rehabilitation of the Mandawe Wetland has included alien invasive eradication and the replacement of cane fields with indigenous forests and grasslands. This has resulted in the planned reintroduction of indigenous wildlife, including the endangered Pickersgill's reed frog, endemic to very few wetlands along the KZN coastline.

== See also ==
- List of protected areas of South Africa
