= Wild Ocean (film) =

- Production company: Giant Screen Films
- Release date: 2008

Wild Ocean is a 2008 documentary 3D IMAX film about the annual migration of billions of sardines, the sardine run, up South Africa's KwaZulu-Natal coast and its human and animal impact.
