= Kelso, South Africa =

Kelso
- Location within KwaZulu-Natal Location within South Africa
- Coordinates: 30°21′37″S 30°42′43″E
- Country: South Africa
- Province: KwaZulu-Natal
- District: Ugu
- Municipality: Umdoni

Area
  - Total: 1.20 km^{2} (0.46 sq mi)

Population (2011)
  - Total: 425
  - Density: 354/km^{2} (917/sq mi)

Racial makeup (2011)
  - Black African: 73.3%
  - Coloured: 0.5%
  - Indian/Asian: 11.1%
  - White: 14.9%
  - Other: 0.2%

First languages (2011)
  - Zulu: 61.6%
  - English: 24.4%
  - Xhosa: 5.1%
  - Afrikaans: 4.4%
  - Other: 4.4%
- Time zone: UTC+2 (SAST)
- PO box: 4183

Kelso is located in the uMdoni Coast region of South Africa facing the Indian Ocean. Kelso is located 65 kilometers south of Durban, the largest city in KwaZulu-Natal.

== History ==
Henry Cooke, one of the original mid-nineteenth century Byrne settlers, named the South African coastal village after the town of Kelso on the Tweed River in Scotland. Before modern transportation, the village of Kelso served as an important link in the transportation of sugar. Vessels launched on the Umzinto River could take their cargo out to the larger ships anchored at sea, off the river mouth.

The Umzinto River, which borders its southern side was the site of a mini gold rush during the 1860s.

== Recreation ==
Kelso is known for its excellent golden beaches and waves that provide great conditions for kitesurfing and surfing. Several competitions take place here annually, including hosting part of the South Coast Surf Carnival.

Fishing at sea is also a popular activity.

== Transport ==
Kelso is served by the railway from Port Shepstone to Durban and had a branch to Umzinto, connecting to the Umzinto - Donnybrook narrow gauge railway until its closure in 1987.

Major roads are the N2 and the R102.
