= Amahlongwa Mission =

Amahlongwa
- Township
- Amahlongwa Mission
- Location within KwaZulu-Natal Location within South Africa Location within Africa
- Coordinates: 30.2360°S 30.7178°E
- Country: South Africa
- Province: KwaZulu-Natal
- District: Ugu District Municipality
- Municipality: uMdoni Local Municipality
- Named after: Amahlongwa River

Government
  - Type: Mayor-council government

Area
  - Total: 10.12 km^{2} (3.91 sq mi)

Population (2011)
  - Total: 7,455
  - Density: 615.86/km^{2} (1,595.1/sq mi)
- Demonym: Amahlongwan

Racial makeup (2011)

First languages (2011)
- Time zone: UTC+2 (SAST)
- Postal code (street): 4170
- PO box: 4180
- Area code: 039

Amahlongwa Mission or simply known as Amahlongwa and oftely informally abbreviated as A.M.H is a small township on the south coast region of KwaZulu-Natal.

== Demography ==
The population of the township in 2011 was 7,455 people with 1,591 households. It has an area of 12.10 square kilometres (4.67 sq mi) with an elevation of 554 metres (1,818 ft) above sea level.

=== Religion ===
Churches in the area include :

- Apostolic Faith Mission of South Africa
- Assemblies of God
- Roman Catholic Church
- Ekuphumeleni Zion Church Of God
- UCCSA, One of the church buildings is located on the original site of the Amahlongwa Mission Station

== Geography ==
=== Location ===
It is under the Umdoni Local Municipality, with neighboring townships such as Amandawe, Dududu, KwaCele, Clausthal.

=== Wildlife ===
The township has a large number of animals such as the black mamba, brown house snake, and spotted bush snake.

== Notable people ==
- Sandile Ngidi - A poet, journalist
- Sphesihle Cele - A computer scientist, software engineer, mathematician and CEO at Dalton Productions.
