= R612 (South Africa) =

Regional route R612

Location
- Country: South Africa

Highway system
- Numbered routes of South Africa
← R603	→ R614

The R612 is a regional route in KwaZulu-Natal, South Africa that connects Park Rynie with Bulwer via Donnybrook, Ixopo, Highflats and Umzinto.

== Route ==
Its south-eastern terminus is at an intersection with the R102 in Park Rynie and heads in a westerly direction. It crosses with the N2 at an off-ramp west of Park Rynie and after 6 kilometres it enters Umzinto. After Umzinto, it goes through the hilly rural area of the South Coast where it notably passes through Highflats and heads in a north-westerly direction. It crosses the R56 (to Kokstad and Pietermaritzburg) in Ixopo and after 35 kilometres it goes through Donnybrook before ending at an intersection with the R617, 5 kilometres south of Bulwer.

== Towns ==
- Donnybrook
- Dumisa
- Highflats
- Ixopo
- Park Rynie
- Umzinto
