= Renishaw Hills =

Propert development in South Africa

Project
- Opening date: 2016
- Size: 25 hectares (62 acres)
- Developer: Renishaw Property Developments, a subsidiary of Crookes Brothers Ltd
- Operator: Inyoni Homes and R&M Construction
- Owner: Barto van Der Merwe, Managing Director of Renishaw Property Developments
- Website: www.renishawhills.co.za

Location
- Location within South Africa
- Coordinates: 30.2756°S 30.7386°E
- Location: Renishaw Coastal Precinct, Scottburgh, KwaZulu-Natal South Coast, South Africa

Renishaw Hills is a 25-hectare residential lifestyle estate for people over 50, located within the Mpambanyoni Conservation Development on the KwaZulu-Natal South Coast. The first six phases of the estate have already been constructed. Once fully developed, Renishaw Hills will have more than 500 units.

Renishaw Hills is near Scottburgh, KwaZulu-Natal, midway along the province's South Coast, 40 minutes from Durban.

== Renishaw Coastal Precinct ==
Renishaw Hills forms part of the Renishaw Coastal Precinct, a 1,300 hectares (3,200 acres) mixed-use development. Construction on the first phase began in 2016, under the direction of Renishaw Property Developments, a subsidiary of Crookes Brothers Limited.

A significant portion of Renishaw Coastal Precinct falls under Umdoni Municipality which, alongside the KZN Department of Environmental Affairs and the National Department of Agriculture, has given the go-ahead for this mixed-use development that includes residential, retail, educational, healthcare and light industrial/commercial zones.

=== Future developments ===
Planning is currently underway for the construction of a 10,000 m^{2} (110,000 sq ft) shopping centre, with mixed-use zoning allowing for potential apartment blocks; a petrol filling station and convenience store, with a fast-food drive-through located at the main Renishaw entrance circle; a school extending from primary school through to high school; a church; and a hotel.

== Community partnerships ==
In 2016, a Memorandum of Understanding (MOU) was signed between developers and the local KwaCele community,

142 hectares of land adjacent to Renishaw Hills has been donated to the local community through the KwaCele Tribal Council. Renishaw Hills also runs skills development programmes.

== Environmental initiatives ==
The development incorporates conservation measures in partnership with the Department of Environmental Affairs. Approximately 80% of the site is designated as conservation land, with ongoing rehabilitation of natural wetlands and indigenous wildlife and vegetation.

The rehabilitation of the Mandawe Wetland has included alien invasive eradication and the replacement of cane fields with indigenous forests and grasslands. This has resulted in the planned reintroduction of indigenous wildlife, including the endangered Pickersgill's reed frog, endemic to very few wetlands along the KZN coastline.

Renishaw Hills has also committed to a joint partnership which undertakes monthly clean-ups, including litter collections and verge cuttings in Scottburgh.

Residents at Renishaw Hills contribute towards the citizen scientist group, iNaturalist, identifying and listing wildlife and plant species on the estate. The list includes more than 17,000 observations with more than 2,000 species identified, including the Sable Cruiser [Phyllomacromia monoceros], a rare, localised and vulnerable dragonfly species. More than 100 butterfly species have been documented at Renishaw Hills since 2017.

== Investment contribution ==
At the 5th SA Investment Conference (SAIC) held at the Sandton Convention Centre on 13 April 2023, Renishaw Hills was one of the developments recognised by South African president, Cyril Ramaphosa, for its significant investment contribution to growing the country's economy. President Ramaphosa initiated the SAIC in 2018 to secure domestic and inbound investment of R1.2 trillion over five years, with the 2023 event the final leg of this investment drive.

== See also ==
- List of protected areas of South Africa
