= Umzumbe Local Municipality =

Coordinates: 30°37′S 30°33′E

Umzumbe
- Local municipality
- Seal

- Location in KwaZulu-Natal
- Country: South Africa
- Province: KwaZulu-Natal
- District: Ugu
- Seat: Mtwalume
- Wards: 19

Government
  - Type: Municipal council
  - Mayor: Londolo Zungu

Area
  - Total: 1,259 km^{2} (486 sq mi)

Population (2011)
  - Total: 160,975
  - Density: 127.9/km^{2} (331.2/sq mi)

Racial makeup (2011)
  - Black African: 99.6%
  - Coloured: 0.1%
  - Indian/Asian: 0.1%
  - White: 0.1%

First languages (2011)
  - Zulu: 95.9%
  - Southern Ndebele: 1.0%
  - Other: 3.1%
- Time zone: UTC+2 (SAST)
- Municipal code: KZN213

Umzumbe Municipality (Zulu: UMasipala wase Mzumbe) is a local municipality within the Ugu District Municipality, in the KwaZulu-Natal province of South Africa. The municipality is named after the Umzumbe River. Towns within the municipal boundaries include Friedenau, KwaDweshula, St Faith’s, and Mathulini.

Income levels in the municipality are very low, and reflect a situation of acute impoverishment. Almost 60% of all households have an income of less than R500 per month. Households rely for survival on pension and other welfare grants, migrant remittances, informal earnings and casual employment wages.

== Main places ==
The 2001 census divided the municipality into the following main places:

Place	Code	Area (km^{2})	Population
Bhekani	50301	9.38	477
Cele	50302	275.53	24,598
Dungeni	50303	39.27	5,363
Emandleni	50304	41.85	6,065
Hlongwa	50305	19.89	3,853
Mbhele / Amaphuthu	50306	62.10	8,776
Ndelu	50307	107.60	18,178
Nhlangwini	50308	83.03	16,764
Nyavini	50309	171.52	19,130
Qoloqolo	50310	54.51	14,177
Qwabe P	50311	57.40	10,504
Shiyabanye	50312	15.89	1,541
St Faith’s	50313	113.56	10,652
Thulini	50314	89.76	45,733

== Politics ==
The municipal council consists of thirty-nine members elected by mixed-member proportional representation. Twenty councillors are elected by first-past-the-post voting in twenty wards, while the remaining nineteen are chosen from party lists so that the total number of party representatives is proportional to the number of votes received.

In the election of 4 November 2026, no party won a majority. The Inkatha Freedom Party won the largest number of seats on the council.

The following table shows the results of the election.

Party	Ward			List			Total seats
Party	Votes	%	Seats	Votes	%	Seats	Total seats
Inkatha Freedom Party	18,613	41.16	16	18,674	41.53	0	16
African National Congress	12,163	26.90	2	11,896	26.45	9	11
uMkhonto weSizwe Party	11,212	24.80	2	11,506	25.59	8	10
National Freedom Party	489	1.08	0	706	1.57	1	1
African Transformation Movement	595	1.32	0	593	1.32	1	1
Independent candidates	597	1.32	0				0
9 other parties	1,548	3.42	0	1,593	3.54	0	0
Total	45,217	100.00	20	44,968	100.00	19	39
Valid votes	45,217	98.26		44,968	98.10		
Invalid/blank votes	799	1.74		872	1.90		
Total votes	46,016	100.00		45,840	100.00		
Registered voters/turnout	84,631	54.37		84,631	54.16		
