= Sezela =

- Location within KwaZulu-Natal Location within South Africa
- Coordinates: 30°25′S 30°41′E
- Country: South Africa
- Province: KwaZulu-Natal
- District: Ugu
- Municipality: Umdoni
- Established: 1915

Area
  - Total: 5.53 km^{2} (2.14 sq mi)

Population (2011)
  - Total: 1,203
  - Density: 218/km^{2} (563/sq mi)

Racial makeup (2011)
  - Black African: 25.7%
  - Coloured: 1.7%
  - Indian/Asian: 66.2%
  - White: 5.8%
  - Other: 0.6%

First languages (2011)
  - English: 75.6%
  - Zulu: 15.1%
  - Xhosa: 2.1%
  - Afrikaans: 1.7%
  - Other: 5.5%
- Time zone: UTC+2 (SAST)
- Postal code (street): 4215
- PO box: 4215

Sezela is a small town on the mouth of iSezela River in KwaZulu-Natal, South Africa. The town is 78.7km south of Durban. It is notable for its large sugar mill.

== Etymology ==
The river and the town are named after a crocodile. In 1828, the Zulu king, Shaka, hunted down a man-eating crocodile here. The crocodile was called iSezela meaning the one who finds by smell, for it was said that the crocodile hunted like a wild dog following a trail.

== History ==
In 1915, the Reynolds Brothers opened a sugar mill at Sezela. This was later purchased by C. G. Smith, then by Illovo Sugar, and finally by Associated British Foods. In his book, Duncan du Bois describes in detail the ill treatment of the Indian indentured labourers who were brought from India to work in the mill. The workers had the choice to return to India after their indenture contract had expired, yet they chose to stay behind to develop this 'unknown area' into Sezela. Sezela was the only Indian settlement alongside the sea in those early years of the Indian colonisation of Natal.

As the town (village) developed, the citizens were initially separated by a race/employment band. Originally, all management positions were reserved for the white race, per Apartheid legislation. Sezela was subdivided into districts: New Dheli; Oceanvale; Lower Sezela; and Upper Sezela (sadly, the latter two districts no longer exist). Sezela boasts two country clubs (Club Blue Horizon and Sezela Country Club) and two primary schools (once called Sezela State Aided Indian and Sezela Primary, the names of the schools were changed after 1994 to acclimatise with the new political atmosphere). The state aided school was heavily subsidised by the local sugar mill. The school, in honour of the subsidy, named their athletics 'houses' after the pioneer sugar magnates.

On 13 August 1954, a whaling vessel belonging to The Union Whaling Company of Durban ran aground on the rocks of Umdoni Point. Due to windstorm and rough seas, the SS Uni X lost a propeller and in the windstorm was blown towards the shore. 13 Sailors were rescued by the Scottburgh Life Saving Club. When the tide is low, one can clearly see some of the remains of this wreck. Parts of this ship are currently on display at Sezela and Selborne Country Club.

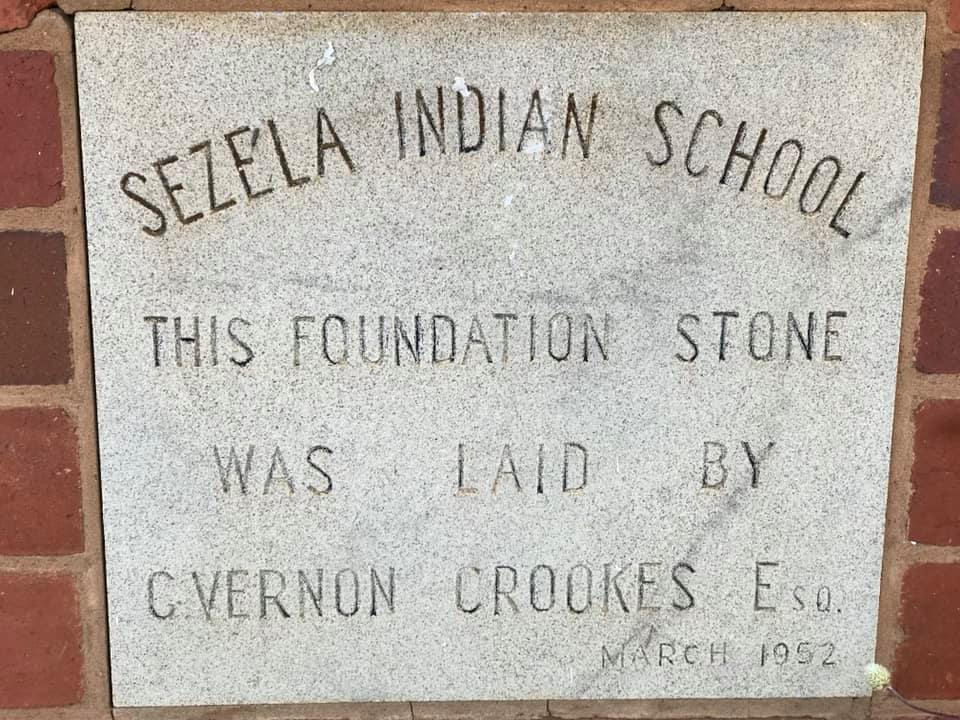
Sezela Primary School Foundation Stone

== Geography ==
Sezela benefits from the long, favourable shorelines of the Indian Ocean. The fishing grounds are rich in resources and the annual sardine run is enjoyed by both locals and visitors. Sezela's famous fishing grounds are: Dazingaan; Shad Cutting (a place where shad get stranded when tide goes out); Mamba Drain (from here locals frequently spot black mambas swimming in this channel); Mill Rock (these rocks are directly opposite the mill); Bowman Rocks (ex local engineer Donald Bowman's favourite fishing rock); Ruben Bay (a boy by the name Ruben drowned in this bay); "A" Frame (named after the A-shaped steel structure of the nearby railway siding); Manning Bay, Raja's Corner and Washing Rocks (which locals use to wash their clothes).

=== Architecture ===
==== Sezela Temple ====
The original Temple was built during the early 1930s with brick walls and a metal roof. A wood and iron hall was built adjacent to the Temple. This hall was used for weddings, the showing of films, and other cultural functions. During the early 1940s, this hall was used as an English Primary school. The premises was also used by the Saiva Sithantha Sungam on Sunday mornings for their Sunday Services.

During the year 1969, the Temple was demolished and relocated to its present site, Lot 70, Syringa Lane. The Temple observes all the festivals in accordance with the Tamil Panchangam. In the context of Murugan worship, the Thaipoosam Kavady Festival is observed annually. During the year 2015, approximately 35 Kavady-bearers offered the Kavady to Lord Murugan on the Main Thaipoosam Kavady Festival Day.

== Demographics ==
=== Religion ===
Sezela is rich in terms of culture and religion. In this small town you can find the following friendly churches: Adonai Baptist; Emmanuel (ECSA); and Prevailing Word Fellowship (Pst.N Sivalingam). There is also a local Siva Subramaniam Temple. The temple hosts Kavadi Attam around January/February annually. All these religious institutions are well run and attended by the local community.

== Sports ==
Sezela's well-known soccer clubs are the Eagles, Celtic Spurs, Young Pilots and the Dheli Falcons.
