= Umzinto =

- Location within KwaZulu-Natal Location within South Africa
- Coordinates: 30°19′S 30°40′E
- Country: South Africa
- Province: KwaZulu-Natal
- District: Ugu
- Municipality: Umdoni

Government
  - Councillor: Ravinand Maharaj (ANC)

Area
  - Total: 42.49 km^{2} (16.41 sq mi)

Population (2011)
  - Total: 16,205
  - Density: 381.4/km^{2} (987.8/sq mi)

Racial makeup (2022)
  - Black African: 21%
  - Coloured: 18.7%
  - Indian/Asian: 59.8%
  - White: 0.4%
  - Other: 0.1%

First languages (2022)
  - English: 81.4%
  - Zulu: 18.59%
  - Xhosa: 0.007%
  - Other: 0.003%
- Time zone: UTC+2 (SAST)
- PO box: 4200
- Area code: 039
- Website: https://ugu.gov.za/

eMuziwezinto, previously and still commonly known as Umzinto, is a town located approximately 40 kilometres (23 miles) south-west of Durban, KwaZulu-Natal. It was a sugarcane growing town, that was set up as the centre for a sugar mill.

Before December 1st, 2023, vehicle registration plates in Umzinto began with "NX", where the "N" represented Natal. The exact meaning of the "X" remains unclear, as this vehicle registration code also covered areas such as Park Rynie, Scottburgh & Umkomaas. The plates have now been updated to the provincial code "ZN", which stands for KwaZulu-Natal.

== Suburbs ==
- Alexandra
- Archibald
- Asoka Heights
- Billie Farm
- Braemar
- Dumisa
- Esperanza
- Gandhinagar
- Hazelwood
- Hibiscus
- Humberdale Farm
- Nishaat Gardens
- Riverside Park
- Roshen Heights
- Roseville
- Sanathan
- Shayamoya
- Sonti
- St. Patricks
- Umzinto CBD
- Umzinto Heights

== Etymology ==
"Umzinto" is said to be derived from the Zulu"umenzi wezinto", meaning "the kraal [or place] of accomplishment".

According to an urban legend, the town's name derived from a visit by two men, one of whom was named Um. On encountering a stream, the men decided to cross it, but Um did not notice the crocodile lurking beneath the surface. Subsequently, Um was attacked by the crocodile, and bitten in half. "Um's in two!" his friend exclaimed. The legend has been ascribed to Jonathan Swift but Swift died in 1745, decades before the British encountered the region.

== History ==
The first public company in Natal was established at Umzinto on the 6 July 1846. The sugarcane fields on the outskirts of Umzinto are owned & run by The Crookes Brothers, a JSE listed company. Umzinto was named the last town in Durban in 1963.

The town was called "Alexandra County" which was also a collection of other towns such as Park Rynie, Scottburgh, Pennington, & Sezela, during the apartheid-era.

== Geography ==
Umzinto lies just inland from the coastal village of Park Rynie, in hilly countryside and to the north of the uMzinto River, after which it is named. The nearest settlements to Umzinto include Park Rynie (8 km), Amandawe (10 km), Scottburgh (12 km), Pennington (16 km) and Amahlongwa (16 km).

== Economy ==
Umzinto was once the home of three large textile mills, namely Alitex, Bally Spinning Mills and MYM Textiles that used to export abroad. Today only one survives and is not as productive as it used to be. Consequently, this has affected the economy of Umzinto negatively.

== Sport ==
Umzinto hosted two class-A cricket matches at the Alexandra Memorial Ground, one on 2 March 1974, when Natal B hosted Griqualand West in the Currie Cup Section B, and again on 19 March 1977, when Natal B faced Border in the same contest.

== Law & Government ==
. In 1995, low cost housing was developed on the outskirts called Gandhi Nagar.

== Education & Community ==
Schools:

- Umzinto Primary School
- Braemar Primary School
- Umzintovale Primary School
- Scholar Amoris School
- Umzinto Islamic School
- St. Annes Primary School
- St. Patricks Primary School
- Umzinto Secondary School
- Roseville Secondary School

Umzinto also houses a Darul-Uloom called "Madrassa Da'watul Haq" that has produced many graduates who have memorised the entire Quraan.

Community Halls:

- Sanathan Hall
- Islamic Cultural Centre
- Umzinto Town Hall

Places of Worship:

- Wayside Chapel
- Sai Ashram Temple
- Sri Shiva (S.S.) Temple
- Sanathan Dharma Temple
- St. Annes Catholic Church
- Gandhinagar Church
- Esperanza Temple
- Umzinto Mosque
- Eagle Mountain Christian Fellowship
- Sri Vishu Temple
- Jaame' Masjid

== Media ==
Radio Station : Life FM KZN

== Infrastructure ==
=== Railways ===
Until halfway through the 1980s, Umzinto was the southern terminus of the Umzinto - Donnybrook narrow gauge railway and had transshipment facilities to a Cape gauge branch line to Kelso, along the railway to Johannesburg

=== Road ===
Nelson Mandela Road (P197-3) is the north–south main road connecting Umzinto with Esperanza and Amandawe that passes through the Umzinto CBD and provides access to the R612, while the R612 is an east–west regional route connecting Park Rynie with Ixopo that by-passes Umzinto to the south and provides access to the N2 freeway (to Durban and Port Shepstone) by-passing Umzinto to the east. Umzinto can also be accessed by turning off the R612 onto Park Rynie Road from the south-east.

== Notable residents ==
- Devi Sankaree Govender (anchorwoman), a South African investigative television journalist
- Bavelile Hlongwa (1981–2019), South African politician and chemical engineer
