= Ifafa Beach =

- Location within KwaZulu-Natal Location within South Africa
- Coordinates: 30°27′S 30°39′E
- Country: South Africa
- Province: KwaZulu-Natal
- District: Ugu
- Municipality: Umdoni

Area
  - Total: 0.58 km^{2} (0.22 sq mi)

Population (2011)
  - Total: 133
  - Density: 230/km^{2} (590/sq mi)

Racial makeup (2011)
  - Black African: 33.6%
  - Coloured: 47.8%
  - White: 15.7%
  - Other: 3.0%

First languages (2011)
  - English: 62.1%
  - Zulu: 25.0%
  - Afrikaans: 9.1%
  - Xhosa: 3.0%
  - Other: 0.8%
- Time zone: UTC+2 (SAST)
- PO box: 4185
- Area code: 039

Ifafa Beach is a small coastal town situated in the KwaZulu-Natal Province of South Africa. It is situated on the lagoon of the Fafa River mouth. The river's name is derived from the Zulu word "iFafa" which means sparkling.
