= Byrne Settler =

Interactive map of the early properties and districts in Beaulieu on Illovo (Richmond)

The term Byrne Settler refers to any emigrant brought to Natal by the company, J. C. Byrne & Co. These people landed in Natal on 20 ships during the years 1849 to 1851. Allotments were laid out in the Byrne valley, near Richmond.

J.C. Byrne & Co. offered prospective emigrants a passage to Natal and 20 acres (81,000 m^{2}) of land at the following rates: L10 for a steerage passage (L15 was the usual fare), and L19 for an intermediate berth. Children under 14 were charged L5 and were entitled to 5 acres (20,000 m^{2}). Cabin passengers could travel for L35, but were not entitled to land (on the ships’ lists they appeared as ‘passengers’, while the others were labelled ‘emigrants’). To take advantage of the land allotment an emigrant had to be approved by Her Majesty's Land and Emigration Commissioners - his/her age had to be 45 maximum unless accompanied by adult offspring, and the only acceptable occupations were the practical ones of farmer, blacksmith, wheelwright, wagon-maker, dairymaid, agricultural labourer, etc.

Byrne was fortunate to obtain the surveyor and civil engineer John Swales Moreland as his agent in Natal. Moreland was committed to his task, energetic and loyal, despite the various trials he was called on to bear.

The first vessel, the Wanderer, sailed on 24 Jan. 1849 with 15 emigrants. She arrived on 16 May, and was followed in July by the Washington, on which John Moreland was a passenger.

Byrne's miscalculations eventually scuttled his scheme. He would have been saved these had he actually visited the Colony. First, he thought there were vast open spaces just waiting to be settled, as a result of the Boers’ withdrawal from Natal once British rule had been established. However, he was out of date. In 1848 Sir Harry Smith, the Cape Governor (Natal was then a district of the Cape), made an attempt to halt the exodus of Boers by relaxing the regulations under which lands were granted. This did not have the desired effect. Instead of returning and occupying the land they were thus able to claim, the Boers more often than not sold it to speculators, sometimes at prices as low as 1d or2d an acre, and withdrew permanently beyond the Drakensberg. Thus the Government had very little left in the way of Crown lands in sufficiently large blocks to allow the settlement of large numbers of emigrants. Then his 20-acre (81,000 m^{2}) lot plan was quite unrealistic, taking into account the Natal countryside - there was no way an immigrant could make a living here on 20 acres (81,000 m^{2}).

Thus Moreland found it extremely difficult to obtain suitable land, i.e. well-watered, with good soil, access to timber for firewood and building purposes, and within easy distance of either Pietermaritzburg or Durban. Many emigrants rejected their allotments as not worth the payment of survey fees, and either found jobs in the towns, or purchased or leased land at very little cost elsewhere. They were certainly not going to buy Byrne’s land at 5/- an acre.

Things went from bad to worse, and eventually in September 1850, Byrne surrendered his estate.
