= Park Rynie =

Resort town in KwaZulu-Natal, South Africa

- Location within KwaZulu-Natal Location within South Africa
- Coordinates: 30°19′S 30°44′E
- Country: South Africa
- Province: KwaZulu-Natal
- District: Ugu
- Municipality: Umdoni
- Main Place: Scottburgh

Area
  - Total: 7.81 km^{2} (3.02 sq mi)

Population (2011)
  - Total: 3,732
  - Density: 478/km^{2} (1,240/sq mi)

Racial makeup (2011)
  - Black African: 34.8%
  - Coloured: 5.1%
  - Indian/Asian: 48.0%
  - White: 11.5%
  - Other: 0.6%

First languages (2011)
  - English: 65.2%
  - Zulu: 23.7%
  - Xhosa: 3.7%
  - Afrikaans: 3.6%
  - Other: 3.8%
- Time zone: UTC+2 (SAST)
- PO box: 4182

Park Rynie is a small resort town on the South Coast of KwaZulu-Natal in South Africa. It was established in 1857 and possibly named after Renetta (nicknamed Rynie) Hoets, wife of one of the John Phillip Hoffman, partner in the firm Nosworthy & Co. that bought the original farm for development. There was a whaling station here built during World War I, Park Rynie Whales Ltd. A breakwater, Rocky Bar Pier and a landing ramp were also built.

Indian South Africans are the single largest population group in Park Rynie.

The main attraction of this town is the quaint beaches. They have an interesting geological and historical value.

== Geography ==
Park Rynie is situated exactly halfway between Durban and Port Shepstone, approximately 63 kilometres (39 mi) south-west of Durban and 63 kilometres (39 mi) north-east of Port Shepstone. Its neighbouring towns include Scottburgh to the north, Pennington to the south, and Umzinto, about 8 km to the west.

== Transport ==
=== Roads ===
Park Rynie is situated along the R102 coastal road, connecting north to Scottburgh and Umkomaas and south to Pennington and Hibberdene. The R612 route connects Park Rynie with Umzinto and Ixopo to the west and provides access to the N2 freeway (to Durban and Port Shepstone), which bypasses to the west.
