= Illovo Sugar =

South Africa sugar producer

Illovo SA
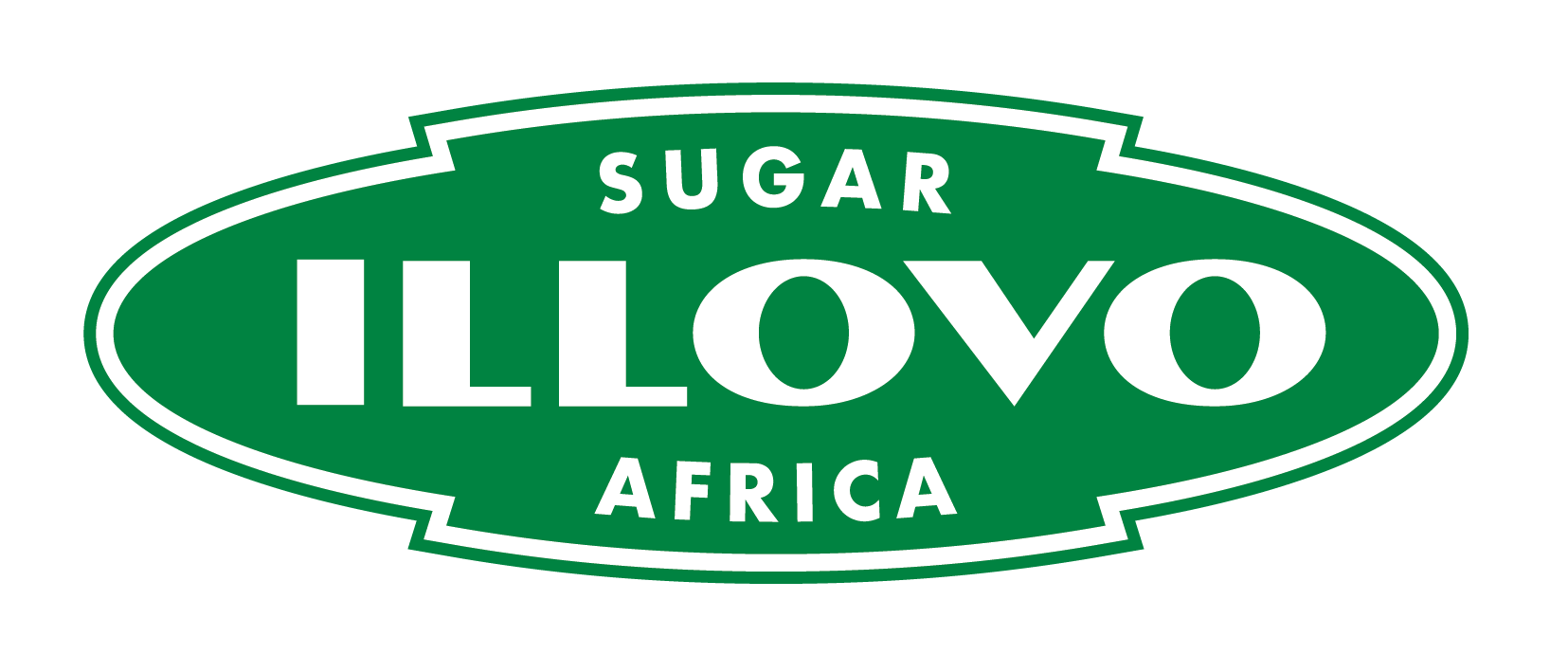
- Type: Subsidiary
- Industry: Agriculture
- Founded: 1891; 135 years ago
- Headquarters: uMhlanga KwaZulu-Natal, South Africa
- Area served: Africa
- Key people: Ricky Govender (Managing Director)
- Products: Sugar
- Parent: ABF Sugar
- Website: illovosugarsa.co.za

Illovo SA, officially Illovo Sugar South Africa, is a South African sugar producer, founded in 1891. The company is headquartered in uMhlanga, KwaZulu-Natal, and is a wholly-owned subsidiary of UK-based ABF Sugar. Illovo derives its sugar cane from a total of 10 farms, eight of which are company-owned.

== History ==
Until the 1960s, Illovo was a subsidiary of the General Mining Company of South Africa, which sold a 49% shareholding in the business to Tate & Lyle in 1969.

This was then sold in 1977 to C G Smith (Sugars) Ltd of Natal. Today it is a subsidiary of Associated British Foods Plc., which purchased 51% of the issued share capital for more than £400m in 2006.

In 2016, ABF bought the remaining 49% of the company's share capital.

== Operations ==
As of 2026, Illovo operates eight Mill Cum Planter (MCP) farms. These are Beaumont, Esperanza, Glenroy, Isonti, Paddock, Ravenhill, Seafield, and Sezela. In addition, the company leases an additional two farms.
