= Dududu =

- Location within KwaZulu-Natal Location within South Africa
- Coordinates: 30.2470°S 30.5740°E
- Country: South Africa
- Province: KwaZulu-Natal
- District: Ugu
- Municipality: Umdoni
- Established: c. 1932

Government
  - Councillor: M.E Mbutho (ANC)

Area
  - Total: 7.78 km^{2} (3.00 sq mi)

Population (2011)
  - Total: 5,642
  - Density: 725/km^{2} (1,880/sq mi)

Racial makeup (2011)
  - Black African: 99.8%
  - Coloured: 0.1%
  - Indian/Asian: 0.1%

First languages (2011)
  - Zulu: 97.8%
  - S. Ndebele: 1.1%
  - Other: 1.0%
- Time zone: UTC+2 (SAST)
- Postal code (street): 4192
- PO box: 4192
- Area code: 039
- Dududu is partially within eThekwini municipality

Dududu is a small rural area in the South Coast of the KwaZulu-Natal province of South Africa. It is also referred to as Zembeni by locals. The area is primarily used for agriculture, i.e. the sugarcane plantations by the Illovo Sugar company.

== History ==
Dududu became infamous in the late '90s during the South African political battles that occurred after the country's first Democratic Elections. The battles spanned all over the country and Dududu was one of those places that were massacred, due to the rivalry between the biggest parties at that time, Inkatha Freedom Party and African National Congress to govern the country. In 2015, Dududu was in the news again when over a hundred bodies were found in what was identified as mass graves at Glenroy Farm, one of two large farms in the area, the other being Cedars Farm. Former workers have since came forward and claimed that the bodies are of those who were bought as prisoners from Durban Central Prison to work on the farm by the owners during the Apartheid regime and they died of various diseases and other natural causes in contrary to people's assumptions. Dududu and its surrounding areas are still very rural and mostly underdeveloped valleys. The locals of Dududu and surroundings are still ruled by the chiefs, whereas in Dududu it is chief Mqadi.

== Education ==
Dududu has five public schools, which are :

● Nhlayenza Junior Primary (Grade R - Grade 4)

● Babongile Senior Primary (Grade 5 - Grade 7)

● Dududu Junior Primary (Grade R - Grade 4)

●Zembeni Senior Primary (Grade 5 - Grade 7)

●Phindavele High School (Grade 8 - Grade 12)

Nhlayenza, Babongile and Dududu Zembeni & Phindavele are at most 1 km apart from one another. As the area has gotten more populated over the years, pupils living in the outskirt valleys such as Bhewula, Mahwaqa, Ntshenkombe and Nkampula have to travel on barefoot for at least an hour to reach the overpopulated schools.

Phindavele High School opened in 1978. The school enrols about 1000 pupils yearly. The school falls under quantile 3.

== Governance ==
Prior to the 2016 local elections, Dududu was removed from the Vulamehlo municipality and split; it is now governed by the eThekwini & uMdoni municipalities. ANC has been governing the municipality after IFP's removal in 2011, after the 4th local elections.

== Settlements ==
In 2008, a contract to build RDP houses was given to GC Civils & Construction by the then IFP led municipality and they began working later that year. The project was completed in 2010, giving access to proper housing to a community living below the poverty line. The area is underdeveloped with half of the main road unpaved and water is fetched from the rivers, taps and tanks that are filled once in two weeks.

== Tourism and attractions ==
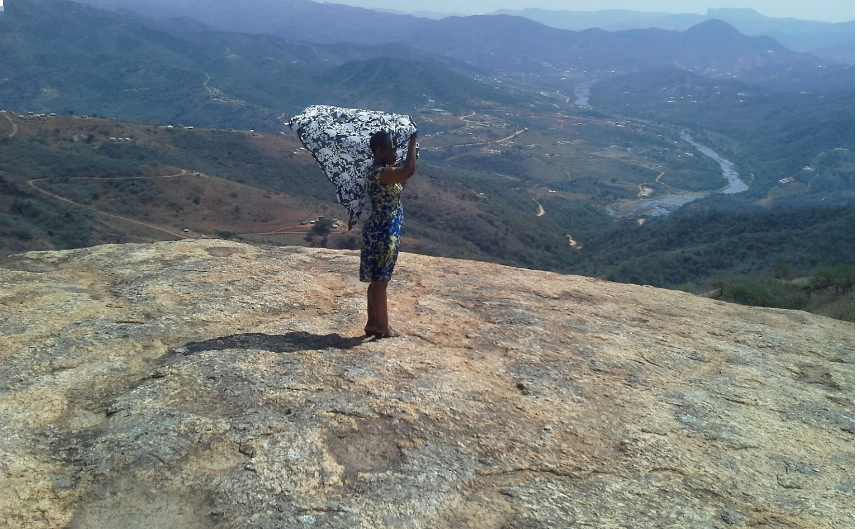
View of the Umkomaas river from the top of Tshenkombo

Dududu lies at the edge of a massive rock known as Tshenkombo, a name derived from Zulu words etsheni laNkombo, which translate to Nkombo's rock. Ancient inhabitants believed Nkombo was a giant snake that resided under the rock. At the top of Tshenkombo, there is clear view of the Umkomaas river.

== Other facilities ==
In Dududu there is Vulamehlo Municipal Court, Home Affairs, Social Development, Library and municipal offices. Also, there is a Dududu public clinic which gets overcrowded due to the limited staff and few wards. The Phindavele sport ground was recreated in 2010 as part of the Fifa mandate to improve the standard of the country that is to host the World Cup.

=== Dududu Drop-in Centre ===
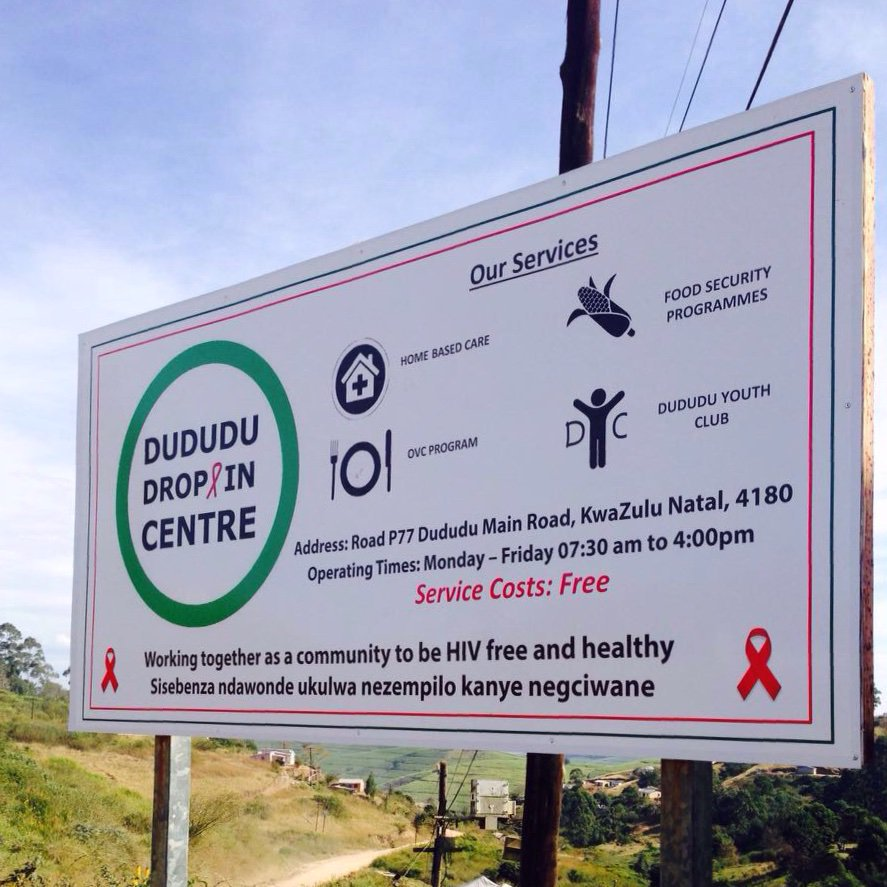
A board at the gate of Dududu Drop-in Centre.

Dududu Drop-in Centre was opened in 2005 after the migration of the Dududu Clinic, to combat socio-economic challenges that the residents face. The challenges addressed are poverty, unemployment, HIV/AIDS and other diseases. Today, the Centre's projects include Women's Craft Co-operative, Food Security Program, OVC Program, Home-Based Care Services and Dududu Youth Club which is under the Canadian NGO foundation, LetsStopAids.
