= Pennington, South Africa =

Pennington
- Location within KwaZulu-Natal Location within South Africa
- Coordinates: 30°23′S 30°42′E
- Country: South Africa
- Province: KwaZulu-Natal
- District: Ugu
- Municipality: Umdoni

Area
  - Total: 9.40 km^{2} (3.63 sq mi)

Population (2011)
  - Total: 2,332
  - Density: 248/km^{2} (643/sq mi)

Racial makeup (2011)
  - Black African: 12.2%
  - Coloured: 1.1%
  - Indian/Asian: 5.2%
  - White: 80.9%
  - Other: 0.6%

First languages (2011)
  - English: 73.5%
  - Afrikaans: 16.6%
  - Zulu: 6.7%
  - Xhosa: 0.5%
  - Other: 2.7%
- Time zone: UTC+2 (SAST)
- PO box: 4184

Pennington is a small coastal town on the south coast of KwaZulu-Natal, South Africa. Apart from a large sugarcane and dairy farming industry, it also hosts scores of holiday makers who flock to the seaside during the December holidays.

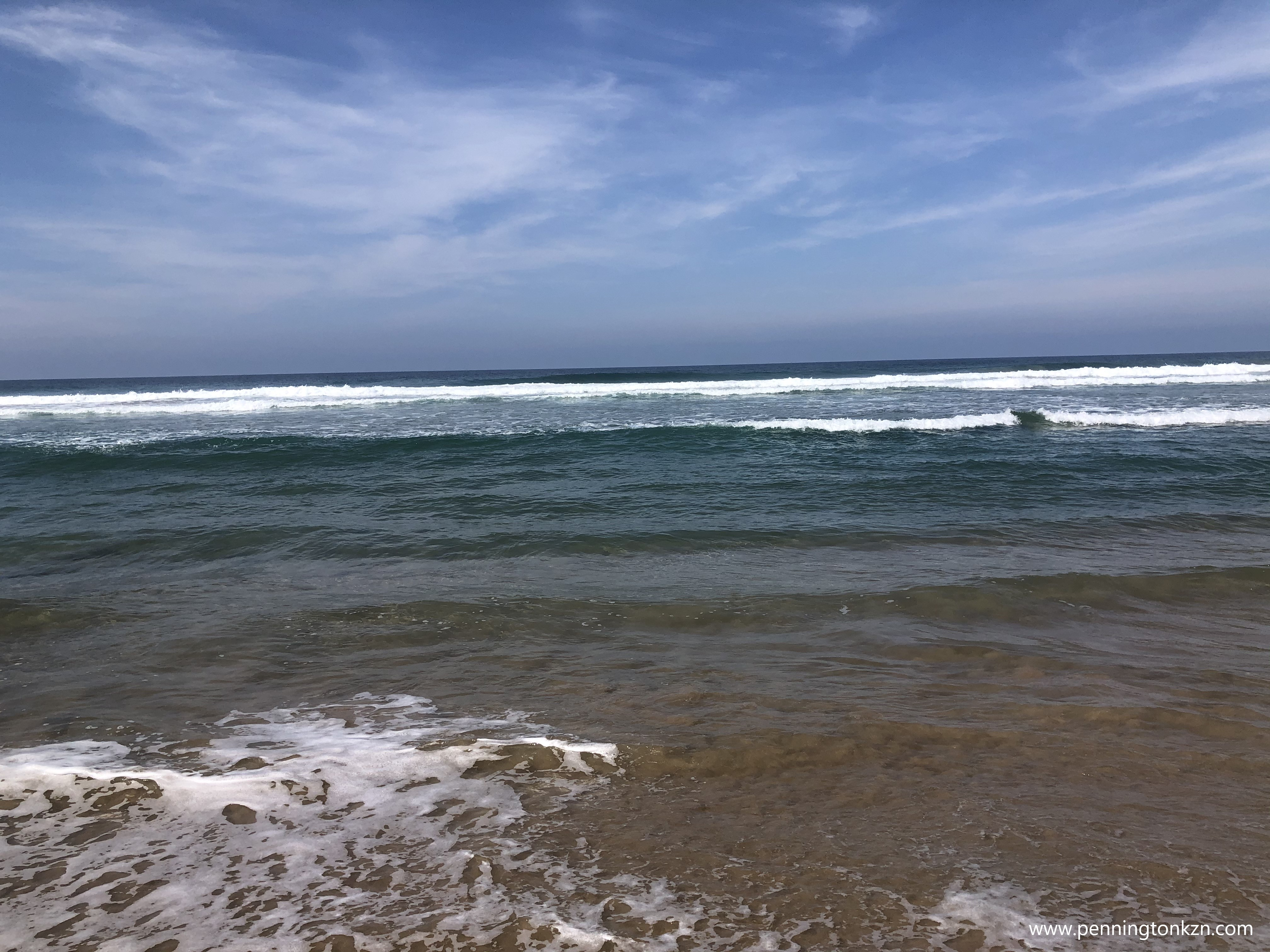
Indian Ocean from Pennington Beach, KwaZulu-Natal

It is named after an English family named Pennington, who began farming here in the late 19th century. Sir Frank Reynolds, the sugar magnate, bought part of the farm and developed a country home which he called Umdoni Park after the mdoni (water myrtle) trees in the area. Sir Frank built a seaside residence for South African prime ministers as a sign of his admiration for the first premier of the Union, General Louis Botha. King George VI of Britain was offered use of this home when his health was failing in 1952, and was planning to visit it just before he died.

The town is set on a hillside looking down onto the Indian Ocean.

The railway runs between the town and the beach (as it does all the way along this coast from Durban to Port Shepstone), but trains are few and cause little problem for visitors.

The area is well served with roads as the N2 motorway runs down from Durban, connecting with the airport and passing Pennington.
