= UMdoni Local Municipality =

Area in KwaZulu-Natal, South Africa

Coordinates: 30°17′S 30°45′E

Umdoni
- Local municipality
- Seal

- Location in KwaZulu-Natal
- Country: South Africa
- Province: KwaZulu-Natal
- District: Ugu
- Seat: Scottburgh
- Wards: 19

Government
  - Type: Municipal council

Area
  - Total: 252 km^{2} (97 sq mi)

Population (2011)
  - Total: 78,875
  - Density: 313/km^{2} (811/sq mi)

Racial makeup (2011)
  - Black African: 76.7%
  - Coloured: 1.2%
  - Indian/Asian: 13.3%
  - White: 8.5%

First languages (2011)
  - Zulu: 67.0%
  - English: 23.0%
  - Xhosa: 4.9%
  - Afrikaans: 2.4%
  - Other: 2.7%
- Time zone: UTC+2 (SAST)
- Municipal code: KZN212

uMdoni Municipality (Zulu: UMasipala wase Mdoni) is a local municipality within the Ugu District Municipality, in the KwaZulu-Natal province of South Africa. uMdoni is the isiZulu name for the indigenous forest waterberry (Syzygium gerrardi) tree.

== Main places ==
The 2011 census divided the municipality into the following main places:

Place	Code	Area (km^{2})	Population
Bazley Beach	50201	1.65	268
KwaCele	50202	0.70	2,543
Dududu	50205	7.78	5,642
Elysium	50203	1.63	189
Emalangeni	50204	2.54	7,009
Ifafa Beach	50206	0.58	133
Ifafa Marina	50207	0.53	187
Kelso	50208	1.20	425
Mtwalume	50209	2.89	610
Park Rynie	50210	7.81	3,732
Pennington	50211	9.40	2,332
Scottburgh (CBD)	50212	1.58	2,131
Sezela	50213	5.53	1,203
Umzinto	50215	12.39	16,205
Remainder of the municipality	50214	118.87	4,138

== Politics ==
The municipal council consists of thirty-seven members elected by mixed-member proportional representation. Nineteen councillors are elected by first-past-the-post voting in nineteen wards, while the remaining eighteen are chosen from party lists so that the total number of party representatives is proportional to the number of votes received.

In the election of 4 November 2026, no party won a majority. The uMkhonto weSizwe Party (MKP) won the most seats, with fifteen.

The following table shows the results of the election.

Party	Ward			List			Total seats
Party	Votes	%	Seats	Votes	%	Seats	Total seats
uMkhonto weSizwe Party	18,807	39.67	11	19,183	40.35	4	15
African National Congress	11,566	24.40	2	11,582	24.36	7	9
Democratic Alliance	8,079	17.04	4	8,389	17.64	3	7
Inkatha Freedom Party	5,536	11.68	2	5,426	11.41	2	4
Economic Freedom Fighters	961	2.03	0	948	1.99	1	1
Al Jama-ah	497	1.05	0	475	1.00	1	1
Independent candidates	407	0.86	0				0
13 other parties	1,556	3.28	0	1,543	3.25	0	0
Total	47,409	100.00	19	47,546	100.00	18	37
Valid votes	47,409	98.72		47,546	98.84		
Invalid/blank votes	615	1.28		559	1.16		
Total votes	48,024	100.00		48,105	100.00		
Registered voters/turnout	84,468	56.85		84,468	56.95		
