= Ugu District Municipality =

Ugu aka indawo engenamanzi
- District municipality
- Seal

- Location of Ugu District Municipality within KwaZulu-Natal
- Coordinates: 30°45′S 30°26′E
- Country: South Africa
- Province: KwaZulu-Natal
- Seat: Port Shepstone
- Local municipalities: List: Ray Nkonyeni; uMdoni; Umzumbe; uMuziwabantu

Government
  - Type: Municipal council
  - Mayor: Sikhumbuzo Issac Mqadi

Area
  - Total: 5,047 km^{2} (1,949 sq mi)

Population (2011)
  - Total: 722,484
  - Density: 143.2/km^{2} (370.8/sq mi)

Racial makeup (2011)
  - Black African: 90.6%
  - White: 4.9%
  - Indian/Asian: 3.4%
  - Coloured: 0.8%

First languages (2011)
  - Zulu: 82.7%
  - English: 8.3%
  - Xhosa: 4.3%
  - Afrikaans: 2.1%
  - Other: 2.6%
- Time zone: UTC+2 (SAST)
- Municipal code: DC21

The Ugu District Municipality (Zulu: UMasipala wesiFunda sase Ugu) is one of the 11 districts of the KwaZulu-Natal province of South Africa. Ugu is isiZulu for "coast" or "water's edge". It governs the KZN South Coast and its seat is Port Shepstone. The majority of its 722,484 inhabitants spoke isiZulu as of 2011. The district code is DC21.

The largest towns in the municipality are Port Shepstone, Margate, Umzinto, Scottburgh and Harding.

== Geography ==
The boundaries of the Ugu District Municipality which covers an area of 5866 square kilometres, coincide with the boundaries of the geographical area of the KwaZulu-Natal South Coast. The municipality stretches 112 kilometres along the coast from Scottburgh in the north to Port Edward in the south and Harding in the west (interior).

The municipality is 84% rural and 16% urban which is the pillar of its successful economy. The municipality consists of eighty one (81) municipal wards, which are in its local municipalities, namely Ray Nkonyeni, Umzumbe, uMdoni and uMuziwabantu. The region also includes forty two (42) traditional authorities.

=== Topography ===
Being a coastal strip, the topography generally falls towards the coast and is segmented by many water courses (streams/rivers) resulting in numerous hills and valleys as well as very flat areas along the coast.

== Mismanagement ==
In 2020, the Portfolio Committee on Cooperative Governance and Traditional Affairs (Cogta) released a report in which various corruption-related matters in the municipality were addressed. In the wake of the report the municipal manager, D.D. Naidoo, was removed from his post. The municipality is suffering from poor service delivery as a direct consequence of its poor management and defective tender procedures. The water crises is real and the UGU municipality doesn't respond to complaints raised by the residents. Some parts in the UGU district has no has water for 8 months.

== Local municipalities ==
The district contains the following local municipalities:

Local municipality	Population	%	Dominant language
Ray Nkonyeni	308 675	37.70%	Zulu
Umzumbe	193 764	27.52%	Zulu
uMuziwabantu	92 322	13.11%	Zulu
uMdoni	78 875	8.85%	Zulu

=== Neighbours ===
Ugu is surrounded by:

- Umgungundlovu to the north (DC22)
- eThekwini to the north-east (Greater Durban)
- the Indian Ocean to the east
- Alfred Nzo to the south (DC44)
- Harry Gwala to the west (DC43)

== Demographics ==
The following statistics are from the 2011 census.

=== Languages ===
Language	Population	%
IsiZulu	588,483	82.69%
English	58,801	8.26%
IsiXhosa	30,440	4.28%
Afrikaans	14,616	2.05%
IsiNdebele	7,191	1.01%
Setswana	3,441	0.48%
Sign language	2,704	0.38%
Other	2,198	0.31%
Sepedi	1,558	0.22%
Sesotho	1,511	0.21%
Tshivenda	319	0.04%
SiSwati	229	0.03%
Xitsonga	214	0.03%

=== Gender ===
Gender	Population	%
Female	383,323	53.06%
Male	339,161	46.94%

=== Ethnic group ===
Ethnic group	Population	%
African	654,773	90.63%
White	35,723	4.94%
Indian/Asian	24,711	3.42%
Coloured	6,123	0.85%
Other	1,154	0.16%

=== Age ===
Age	Population	%
000 - 004	76 009	10.80%
005 - 009	91 171	12.95%
010 - 014	94 511	13.42%
015 - 019	90 364	12.84%
020 - 024	60 699	8.62%
025 - 029	49 685	7.06%
030 - 034	39 537	5.62%
035 - 039	38 238	5.43%
040 - 044	32 451	4.61%
045 - 049	25 936	3.68%
050 - 054	24 122	3.43%
055 - 059	19 163	2.72%
060 - 064	18 861	2.68%
065 - 069	15 046	2.14%
070 - 074	13 976	1.99%
075 - 079	6 998	0.99%
080 - 084	4 522	0.64%
085 - 089	1 631	0.23%
090 - 094	688	0.10%
095 - 099	291	0.04%
100 plus	102	0.01%

== Politics ==
=== Election results ===
Ugu District Municipality Results - 2021

Election results for Ugu in the South African general election, 2004.

- Population 18 and over: 385 659 [54.78% of total population]
- Total votes: 216 751 [30.79% of total population]
- Voting % estimate: 56.20% votes as a % of population 18 and over

Party	Votes	%
African National Congress	124 925	57.64%
Inkhata Freedom Party	59 740	27.56%
Democratic Alliance	17 121	7.90%
African Christian Democratic Party	3 678	1.70%
Minority Front	2 245	1.04%
United Democratic Movement	1 715	0.79%
Independent Democrats	1 218	0.56%
Freedom Front Plus	1 049	0.48%
New National Party	842	0.39%
Azanian People's Organisation	768	0.35%
Pan African Congress	480	0.22%
SOPA	448	0.21%
United Christian Democratic Party	424	0.20%
EMSA	382	0.18%
UF	380	0.18%
PJC	349	0.16%
CDP	281	0.13%
TOP	265	0.12%
NA	183	0.08%
KISS	155	0.07%
NLP	103	0.05%
Total	216 751	100.00%
