= Trust Feed =

Massacre of civilians by police

- Location within KwaZulu-Natal Location within South Africa
- Coordinates: 29.398°S 30.542°E
- Country: South Africa
- Province: KwaZulu-Natal
- District: UMgungundlovu
- Municipality: uMshwathi

Area
  - Total: 2.14 km^{2} (0.83 sq mi)

Population (2011)
  - Total: 5,760
  - Density: 2,690/km^{2} (6,970/sq mi)

Racial makeup (2011)
  - Black African: 97.7%
  - Coloured: 0.4%
  - Indian/Asian: 0.1%
  - White: 1.8%

First languages (2011)
  - Zulu: 92.5%
  - English: 2.9%
  - Sotho: 2.4%
  - Other: 2.2%
- Time zone: UTC+2 (SAST)
- PO box: 3233

1988 Trust Feed Massacre
- Location: Trust Feed, KwaZulu-Natal
- Date: 3 December 1988
- Target: Apparent UDF supporters
- Attack type: Mass shooting
- Deaths: 11 Inkatha supporters
- Assailant: South African Police officers
- Convicted: Captain Brian Mitchell (granted amnesty in 1996)

Trust Feed is a small rural town in Umgungundlovu District Municipality in the KwaZulu-Natal province of South Africa.

The 1988 Trust Feed massacre, in which 11 people were shot dead by police, was significant in that it was one of the first cases of political violence in which the involvement of senior police officers was proven. At the time, the massacre was taken as evidence for allegations of so-called Third Force activity. The officer convicted of ordering the killings later became the first member of the apartheid security forces to be granted amnesty by the Truth and Reconciliation Commission.

== 1988 massacre ==
=== Background ===
During apartheid, under the Group Areas Act, Trust Feed was what was called a "black spot" – a primarily black town in a white area – and thus a likely target for forced removals. In 1982, the Trust Feed Crisis Committee, a residents' association, was established to organise against the threat of forced removals in Trust Feed. That threat was conclusively removed in March 1988, when Trust Feed was designated a black development area. By that time, the Crisis Committee effectively ran and controlled the town. It had some success in organising the development of the town's infrastructure: in 1982, the Trust Feed population had shared three taps and one school; by late 1988, the roads and water supply had been improved, and a clinic was under construction.

However, the Crisis Committee was reportedly aligned to the United Democratic Front (UDF), and Trust Feed is close to Pietermaritzburg in a region which was affected from the mid-1980s by power struggles and conflict between Inkatha and the African National Congress-aligned UDF. By 1988, Inkatha was actively recruiting in and around Trust Feed, leading to violence that allegedly resulted in deaths among both Inkatha and UDF supporters.

=== Massacre ===
In late November 1988, a state of emergency was declared in Trust Feed, meaning that journalists were prohibited from entering the town. On the night of 2 December, several leaders of the Crisis Committee were detained and their houses searched and destroyed.

Around 3 a.m. on 3 December, a police squad entered house TF83, which officers believed to be the site of a funeral vigil attended by UDF members. They opened fire, killing 11 people – three men, six women, and two children, aged nine and four. Two others were injured but survived because they were shielded by other bodies.

The victims were Mseleni Ntuli, Dudu Shangase, Zetha Shangase, Nkoyeni Shangase, Muzi Shangase, Filda Ntuli, Fikile Zondi, Maritz Xaba, Sara Nyoka, Alfred Zita, and Sisedewu Sithole.

=== Aftermath ===
When it emerged that the victims were in fact IFP supporters, the police blamed the massacre on the UDF. Hundreds of UDF supporters fled Trust Feed, fearing an outbreak of political violence, and the town's population is estimated to have dropped by about a third by 1990. The Trust Feed Crisis Committee was dissolved.

=== Responsibility ===
The killings were carried out by four Zulu special constables in the South African Police, under the orders of Captain Brian Mitchell, who was commander of the nearby New Hanover police station and head of the local Joint Management Committee. In court, Mitchell testified that the massacre was part of a larger state effort, supported by the security forces, to empower Inkatha at the expense of the ANC and UDF. Others alleged that the local Inkatha branch had been cooperating with the police to this end, and the Truth and Reconciliation Commission found that at least one senior Inkatha member had been involved in planning the attack.

The police's involvement in the murder was uncovered and investigated by another police captain, Frank Dutton, in 1990. Following a criminal trial, Mitchell was given eleven death sentences in late April 1992. The four special constables were sentenced to fifteen years' imprisonment each, and two white officers were acquitted. Mitchell's sentence was commuted to life imprisonment in April 1994 by President F. W de Klerk, and he was released from prison in November 1996 after being granted amnesty by the Truth and Reconciliation Commission on the grounds that the massacre was politically motivated. Mitchell committed to help rebuild Trust Feed and, after his release, he met with the community to ask their forgiveness in a televised "reconciliation meeting."
