= Dalton, KwaZulu-Natal =

Dalton
- Location within KwaZulu-Natal Location within South Africa
- Coordinates: 29°20′S 30°38′E
- Country: South Africa
- Province: KwaZulu-Natal
- District: UMgungundlovu
- Municipality: uMshwathi
- Established: 1850

Area
  - Total: 1.28 km^{2} (0.49 sq mi)

Population (2011)
  - Total: 1,493
  - Density: 1,170/km^{2} (3,020/sq mi)

Racial makeup (2011)
  - Black African: 81.4%
  - Coloured: 0.7%
  - Indian/Asian: 6.6%
  - White: 9.6%
  - Other: 1.7%

First languages (2011)
  - Zulu: 58.6%
  - English: 21.3%
  - Xhosa: 12.8%
  - Afrikaans: 1.8%
  - Other: 5.5%
- Time zone: UTC+2 (SAST)
- PO box: 3236
- Area code: 033

Dalton is a village located 11 kilometres (6.8 mi) east of New Hanover and 35 kilometres (22 mi) south of Greytown in the uMshwathi Local Municipality of KwaZulu-Natal, South Africa

The town is named after North Dalton in Yorkshire, the hometown of Henry Boast, who organized an immigration to Natal in 1850 of people from Yorkshire. It is the railway junction for the Noodsberg line.

The main local industry is the production of sugarcane, with the Union Cooperative and Illovo Noodsberg mills nearby.
