= UMshwathi Local Municipality elections =

Local elections in KwaZulu-Natal, South Africa

The uMshwathi Local Municipality council consists of twenty-seven members elected by mixed-member proportional representation. Fourteen councillors are elected by first-past-the-post voting in fourteen wards, while the remaining thirteen are chosen from party lists so that the total number of party representatives is proportional to the number of votes received.

In the election of 4 November 2026, no party won a majority. The uMkhonto weSizwe Party won the largest number of seats on the council, with thirteen.

== Results ==
The following table shows the composition of the council after past elections.

Event	ANC	DA	EFF	IFP	MKP	Other	Total
2000 election	11	1	—	7	—	3	22
2006 election	14	2	—	5	—	1	22
2011 election	19	2	—	3	—	2	26
2016 election	20	2	1	4	—	0	27
2021 election	16	2	3	4	—	2	27
2026 election	9	2	0	3	13	0	27

== December 2000 election ==
The following table shows the results of the 2000 election.

Party	Ward			List			Total seats
Party	Votes	%	Seats	Votes	%	Seats	Total seats
African National Congress	8,083	50.86	8	7,978	50.32	3	11
Inkatha Freedom Party	4,910	30.89	2	4,969	31.34	5	7
Alliance of Associated Residents of KZ221	1,698	10.68	1	1,553	9.80	1	2
Democratic Alliance	765	4.81	0	1,017	6.41	1	1
Pan Africanist Congress of Azania	236	1.48	0	338	2.13	1	1
Independent candidates	202	1.27	0				0
Total	15,894	100.00	11	15,855	100.00	11	22
Valid votes	15,894	97.40		15,855	97.23		
Invalid/blank votes	424	2.60		452	2.77		
Total votes	16,318	100.00		16,307	100.00		
Registered voters/turnout	36,308	44.94		36,308	44.91		

== March 2006 election ==
The following table shows the results of the 2006 election.

Party	Ward			List			Total seats
Party	Votes	%	Seats	Votes	%	Seats	Total seats
African National Congress	12,657	61.60	11	13,156	64.42	3	14
Inkatha Freedom Party	4,517	21.98	0	4,632	22.68	5	5
Democratic Alliance	1,332	6.48	0	1,377	6.74	2	2
Independent candidates	1,086	5.29	0				0
African Christian Democratic Party	483	2.35	0	575	2.82	1	1
National Democratic Convention	336	1.64	0	440	2.15	0	0
Pan Africanist Congress of Azania	136	0.66	0	243	1.19	0	0
Total	20,547	100.00	11	20,423	100.00	11	22
Valid votes	20,547	97.75		20,423	97.46		
Invalid/blank votes	474	2.25		532	2.54		
Total votes	21,021	100.00		20,955	100.00		
Registered voters/turnout	40,743	51.59		40,743	51.43		

== May 2011 election ==
The following table shows the results of the 2011 election.

Party	Ward			List			Total seats
Party	Votes	%	Seats	Votes	%	Seats	Total seats
African National Congress	22,698	70.08	13	24,254	74.79	6	19
Inkatha Freedom Party	3,415	10.54	0	3,418	10.54	3	3
National Freedom Party	2,028	6.26	0	2,077	6.40	2	2
Democratic Alliance	1,981	6.12	0	2,072	6.39	2	2
Independent candidates	1,511	4.67	0				0
African Christian Democratic Party	366	1.13	0	352	1.09	0	0
Pan Africanist Congress of Azania	391	1.21	0	255	0.79	0	0
Total	32,390	100.00	13	32,428	100.00	13	26
Valid votes	32,390	97.71		32,428	97.65		
Invalid/blank votes	758	2.29		782	2.35		
Total votes	33,148	100.00		33,210	100.00		
Registered voters/turnout	49,540	66.91		49,540	67.04		

== August 2016 election ==
The following table shows the results of the 2016 election.

Party	Ward			List			Total seats
Party	Votes	%	Seats	Votes	%	Seats	Total seats
African National Congress	26,120	70.43	14	27,196	74.96	6	20
Inkatha Freedom Party	4,336	11.69	0	4,401	12.13	4	4
Democratic Alliance	2,924	7.88	0	3,074	8.47	2	2
Independent candidates	2,454	6.62	0				0
Economic Freedom Fighters	1,096	2.96	0	1,291	3.56	1	1
African Christian Democratic Party	157	0.42	0	319	0.88	0	0
Total	37,087	100.00	14	36,281	100.00	13	27
Valid votes	37,087	98.10		36,281	96.50		
Invalid/blank votes	717	1.90		1,317	3.50		
Total votes	37,804	100.00		37,598	100.00		
Registered voters/turnout	55,846	67.69		55,846	67.32		

== November 2021 election ==
The following table shows the results of the 2021 election.

Party	Ward			List			Total seats
Party	Votes	%	Seats	Votes	%	Seats	Total seats
African National Congress	17,294	59.19	14	17,115	58.54	2	16
Inkatha Freedom Party	4,155	14.22	0	4,554	15.58	4	4
Economic Freedom Fighters	3,605	12.34	0	3,656	12.50	3	3
Democratic Alliance	1,973	6.75	0	1,945	6.65	2	2
Abantu Batho Congress	1,186	4.06	0	1,220	4.17	1	1
Patriotic Alliance	399	1.37	0	480	1.64	1	1
Independent candidates	396	1.36	0				0
African Christian Democratic Party	116	0.40	0	149	0.51	0	0
National Freedom Party	94	0.32	0	119	0.41	0	0
Total	29,218	100.00	14	29,238	100.00	13	27
Valid votes	29,218	97.41		29,238	97.70		
Invalid/blank votes	776	2.59		687	2.30		
Total votes	29,994	100.00		29,925	100.00		
Registered voters/turnout	56,822	52.79		56,822	52.66		

=== By-elections from November 2021 ===
The following by-elections were held to fill vacant ward seats in the period since the election in November 2021.

Date	Ward	Party of the previous councillor	Party of the newly elected councillor
8 March 2023	12	African National Congress	African National Congress
13 March 2024	6	African National Congress	African National Congress

In a ward 12 by-election, held on 8 March 2023 after the death of the ANC councillor, the ANC narrowly retained the ward after a large swing to the Inkatha Freedom Party (IFP).

== November 2026 election ==
The following table shows the results of the 2026 election.

Party	Ward			List			Total seats
Party	Votes	%	Seats	Votes	%	Seats	Total seats
uMkhonto weSizwe Party	16,186	46.82	11	16,374	47.24	2	13
African National Congress	11,349	32.83	2	11,226	32.39	7	9
Inkatha Freedom Party	3,077	8.90	0	3,174	9.16	3	3
Democratic Alliance	2,379	6.88	1	2,379	6.86	1	2
Independent Councillors	552	1.60	0	502	1.45	0	0
Economic Freedom Fighters	375	1.08	0	383	1.10	0	0
Patriotic Alliance	204	0.59	0	118	0.34	0	0
South African Communist Party	150	0.43	0	162	0.47	0	0
Afrika Mayibuye Movement	109	0.32	0	112	0.32	0	0
National Freedom Party	102	0.30	0	95	0.27	0	0
African Transformation Movement	55	0.16	0	117	0.34	0	0
Bumbana Mzansi	33	0.10	0	22	0.06	0	0
Total	34,571	100.00	14	34,664	100.00	13	27
Valid votes	34,571	98.43		34,664	98.72		
Invalid/blank votes	551	1.57		449	1.28		
Total votes	35,122	100.00		35,113	100.00		
Registered voters/turnout	62,194	56.47		62,194	56.46		
