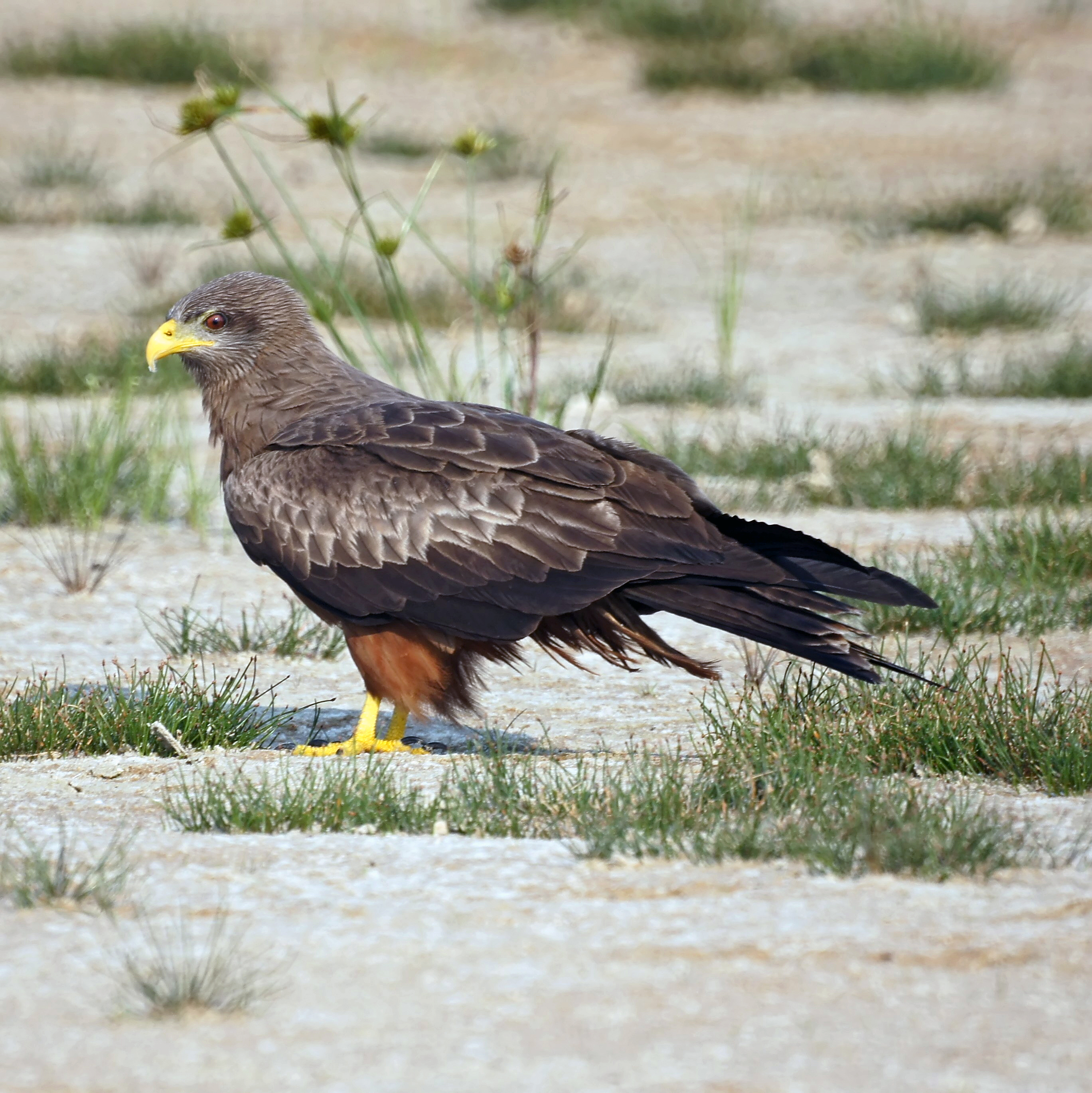
- Adult in Limpopo, South Africa
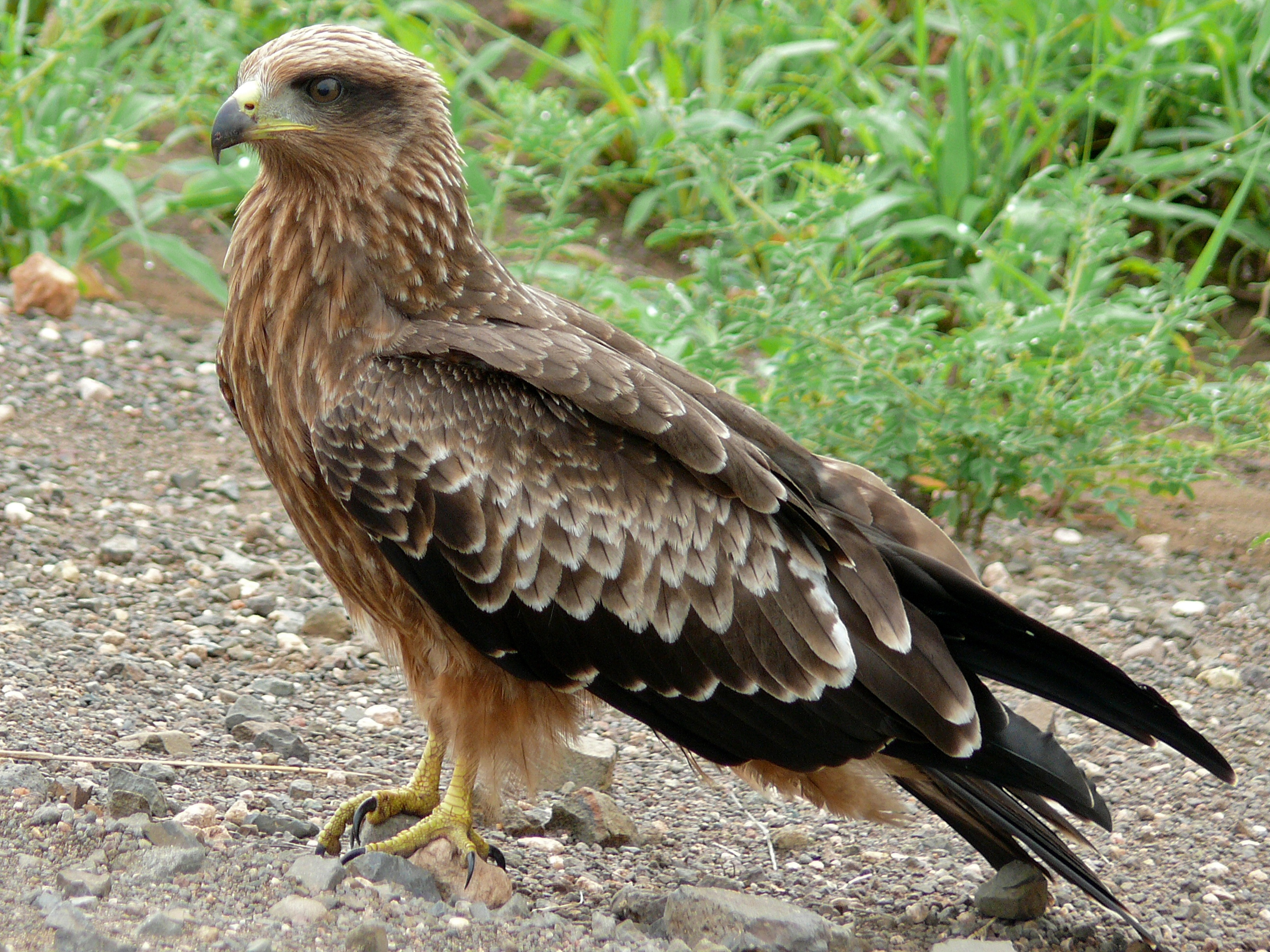
- Juvenile in the Kruger Park, South Africa

Conservation status
- Least Concern (IUCN 3.1)

Scientific classification
- Kingdom: Animalia
- Phylum: Chordata
- Class: Aves
- Order: Accipitriformes
- Family: Accipitridae
- Genus: Milvus
- Species: M. aegyptius

Binomial name
- Milvus aegyptius (Gmelin, JF, 1788)

Subspecies
- M. a. aegyptius - (Gmelin, JF, 1788); M. a. parasitus - (Daudin, 1800)
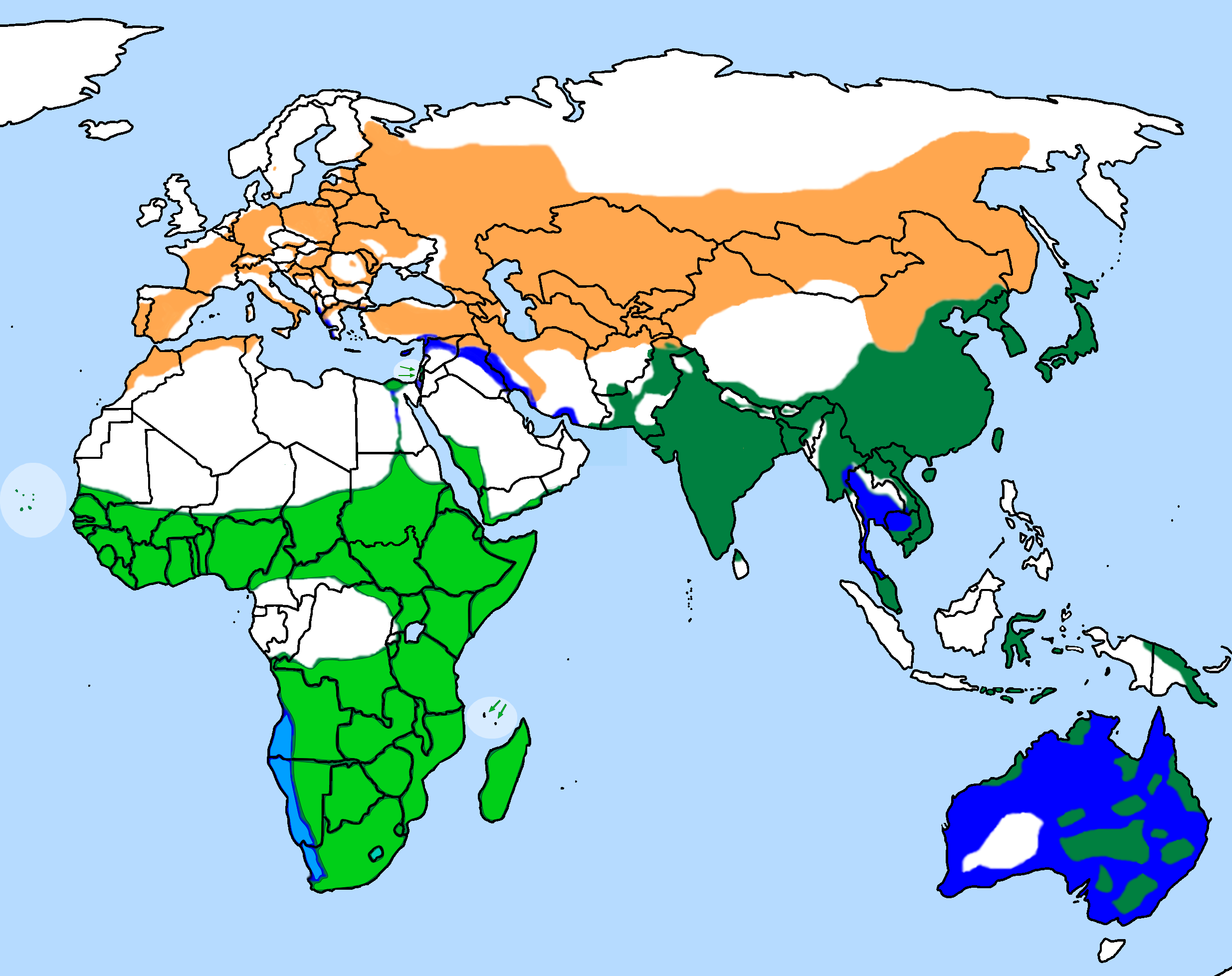
- Milvus aegyptius range (light green)

= Yellow-billed kite =

Species of bird

The yellow-billed kite (Milvus aegyptius) is the Afrotropical counterpart of the black kite (Milvus migrans), of which it is most often considered a subspecies. However, DNA studies suggest that the yellow-billed kite differs significantly from black kites in the Eurasian clade, and should be considered as a separate, allopatric species.

== Taxonomy ==
The yellow-billed kite was formally described in 1788 by the German naturalist Johann Friedrich Gmelin in his revised and expanded edition of Carl Linnaeus's Systema Naturae. He specified that the bird was found in Egypt, placed it with the eagles, falcons and relatives in the genus Falco and coined the binomial name Falco aegyptius. Unusually, Gmelin did not cite a source for his information. The yellow-billed kite is now one of three kites placed in the genus Milvus that was introduced in 1799 by the French naturalist Bernard Germain de Lacépède.

There are two subspecies:

| Image | Subspecies | Distribution |
|---|---|---|
| | M. a. parasitus (Daudin, 1800) | found throughout most of Sub-Saharan Africa (including Madagascar), except for the Congo Basin (with intra-African migrations) |
| | M. a. aegyptius (Gmelin, JF, 1788) | Egypt, southwestern Arabia and the Horn of Africa (which disperses south during the non-breeding season). |

The yellow-billed kite was formerly considered as conspecific with the black kite (Milvus migrans). A molecular phylogenetic study published in 2005 compared DNA sequences of two mitochondrial loci of the red, black and yellow-billed kites. It found that there was significant divergence between the three species, but unexpectedly, the two clades corresponding to the M. a. aegyptius and M. a. parasitus subspecies did not form a monophyletic group.

== Description ==
The yellow-billed kite is a medium-sized, opportunistic raptor, with recorded measurements for an adult male including a weight of 550 g, a wingspan of 398 mm, and a tail length of 255 mm. As suggested by its name, the yellow-billed kite is easily recognized by its entirely yellow bill, unlike that of the black kite (which is present in Africa as a visitor during the Northern Hemisphere winter). However, immature yellow-billed kites resemble the black kites of the corresponding age.

== Behaviour ==
The yellow-billed kite is generally gregarious during both its breeding and non-breeding periods, although individual breeding pairs are not. They are described as facultative colonial species. Research conducted in the Albert Falls region of KwaZulu-Natal (KZN), South Africa, found that nesting density increased significantly in proximity to reliable, surplus food sources (specifically crocodile farms) which effectively resulted in the formation of colonies.

== Habitat and feeding ==
They are found in almost all habitats, including parks in suburbia, but rare in the arid Namib and Karoo. While adaptable, the species is more abundant in higher rainfall regions in addition to woodlands, especially those with dense rural human habitation compared to grasslands and desert areas. Research conducted in KZN, South Africa, found that yellow-billed kites specifically preferred riparian areas characterized by dense vegetation and tall trees (such as Eucalyptus camaldulensis) for nesting, while consistently avoiding cultivated land and open woodlands.

The yellow-billed kite highly commensal with humans and thrives in human-dominated environments by exploiting an increased food supply from human refuse and reliable scavenging opportunities at specialized facilities. In the Albert Falls region of South Africa, the presence of crocodile farms has historically attracted thousands of kites to the area to exploit surplus meat.

They feed on a wide range of small vertebrates and insects, much of which is scavenged. In addition to scavenging, the yellow-billed kite is an active hunter that utilizes elevated perches within thickets as strategic vantage points to prey on small animals. While they avoid cultivated land for nesting, telemetry data acquired from tracking a yellow-billed kite showed that their diurnal activity can be flexible, frequently using croplands and grasslands for foraging.

== Migration ==
A nine-year study conducted at a communal roost near Pietermaritzburg, South Africa, identified high interannual synchrony in the post breeding migratory departure of yellow billed kites. Over the study from 2016 to 2024, the birds were found to depart almost exclusively within a narrow window between March 20th and 26th each year. This consistent timing suggests that migration is driven by endogenous cues, such as hormonal changes triggered by decreasing day length (photoperiod) rather than external environmental factors. Researchers concluded that cues like food availability were not the primary drivers because the kites departed on schedule despite the presence of a reliable and abundant food supply at a nearby crocodile farm.

== Status ==
It is mostly an intra-African breeding migrant, present in Southern Africa July–March and sometimes as late as May. It is generally common. There are no threats to this species as stated by the IUCN.

== Gallery ==
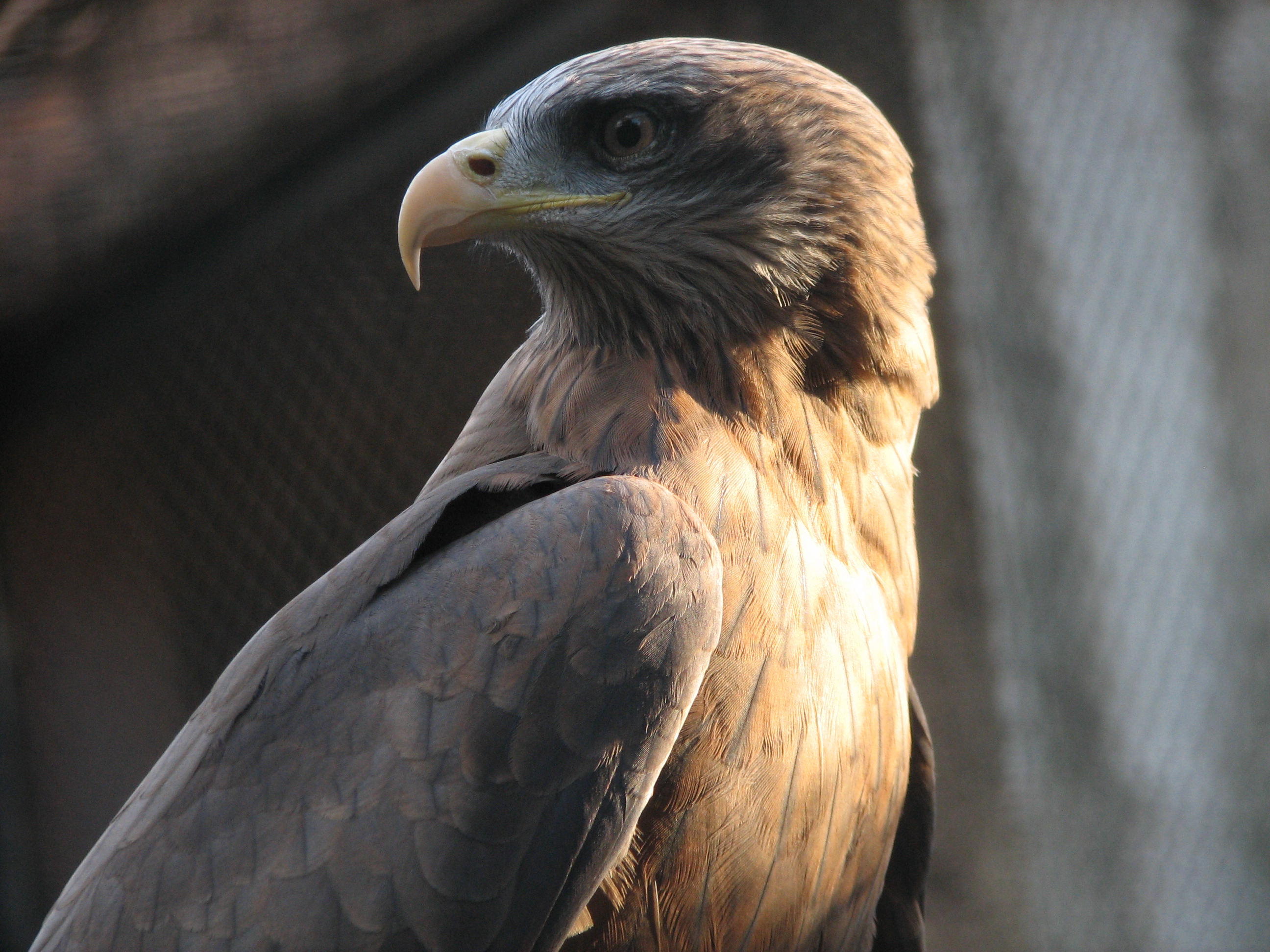
At Tsimbazaza Zoo, Madagascar

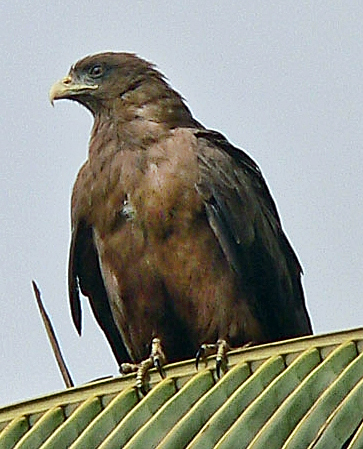
Milvus aegyptius parasitus

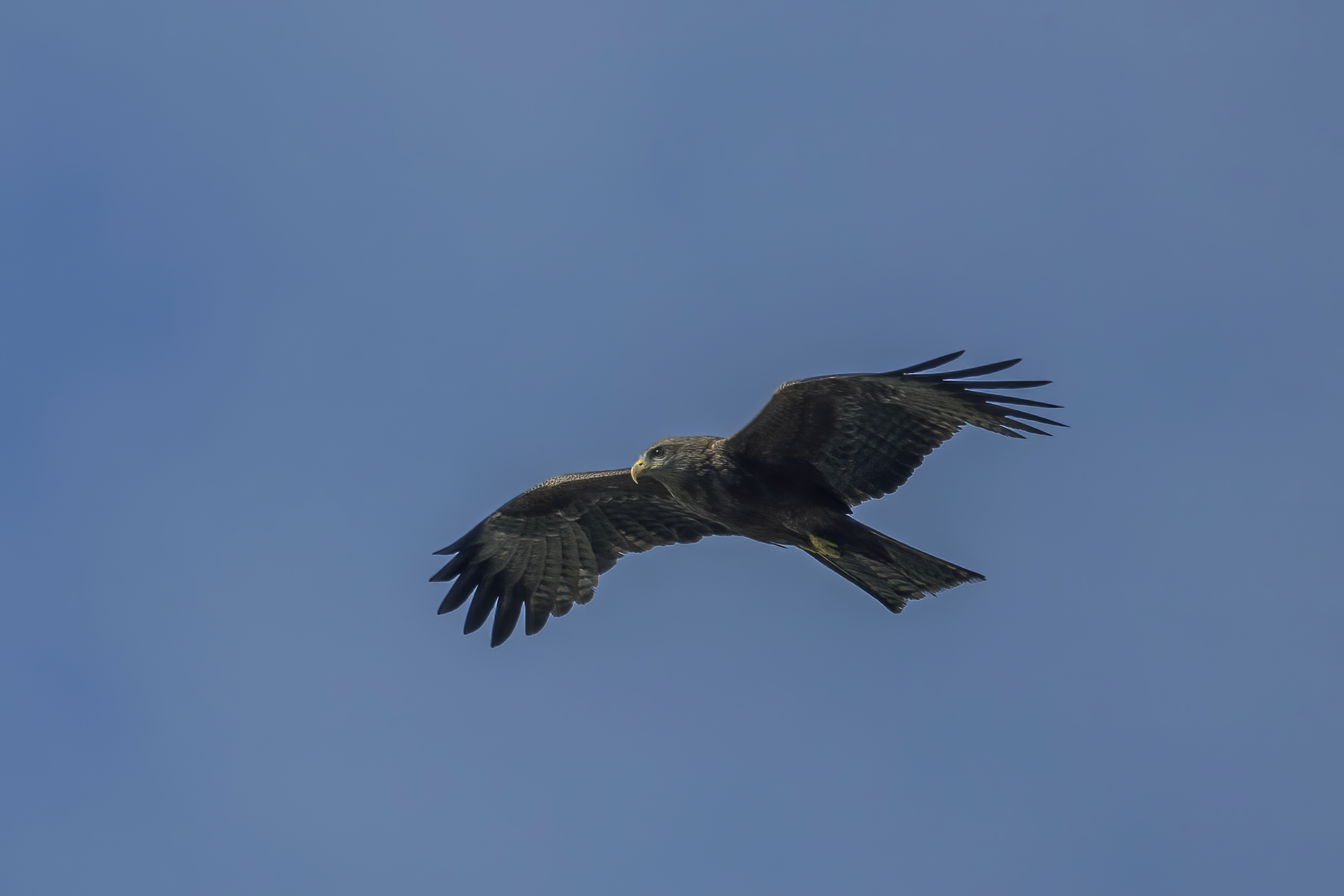
M. a. parasitus, São Tomé and Príncipe

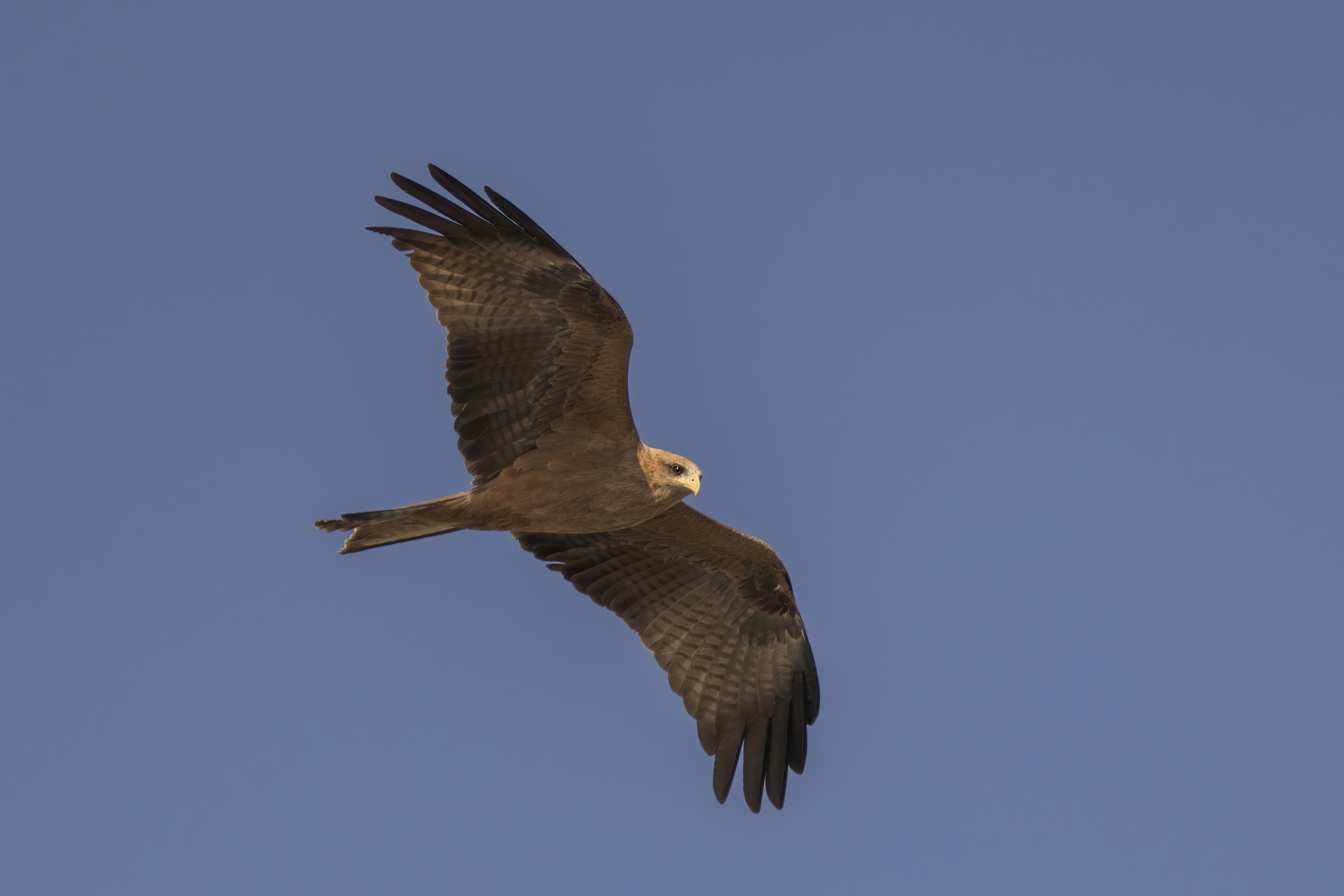
M. a. aegyptius, Ethiopia

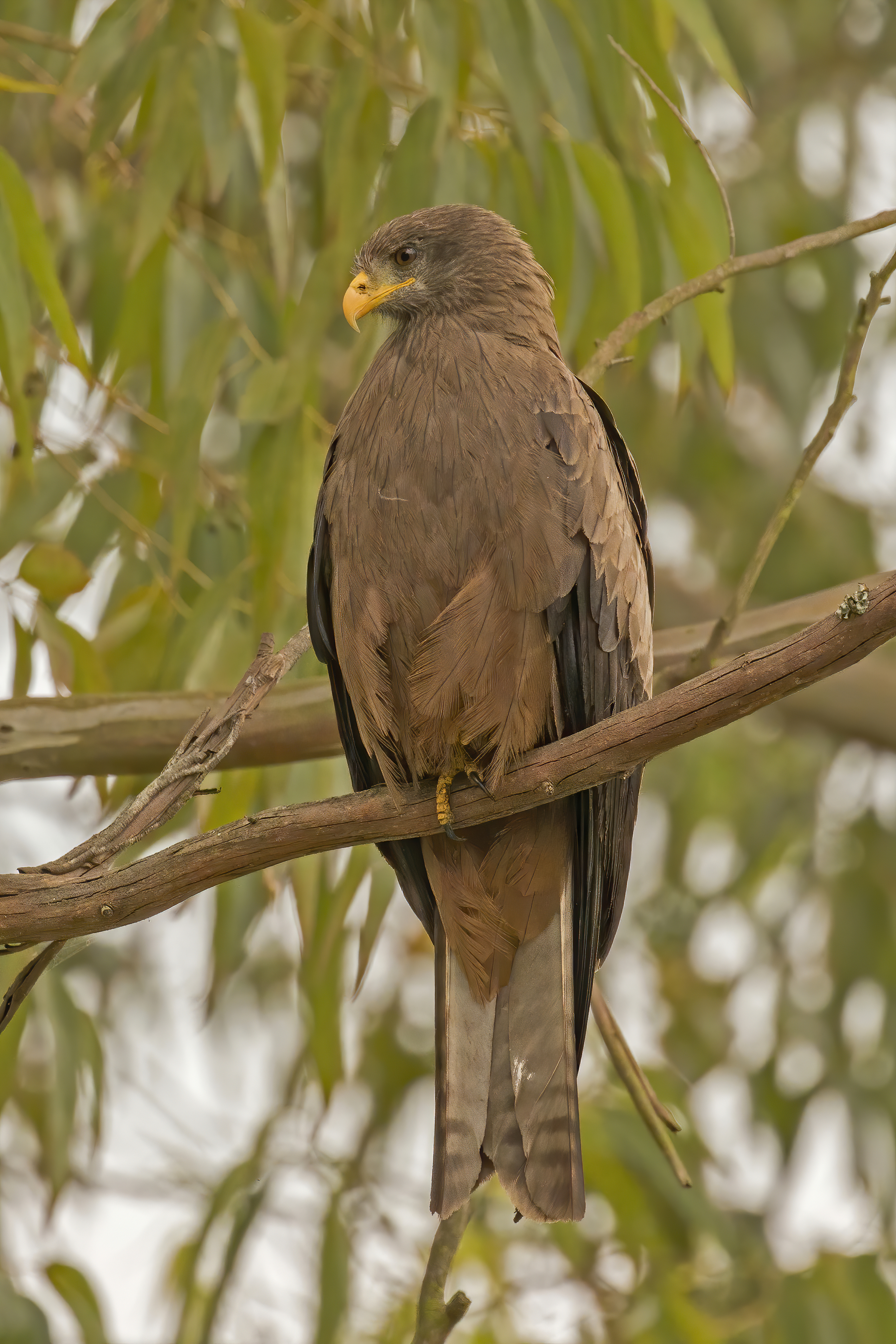
Milvus aegyptius parasitus, Lake Bunyonyi, Uganda

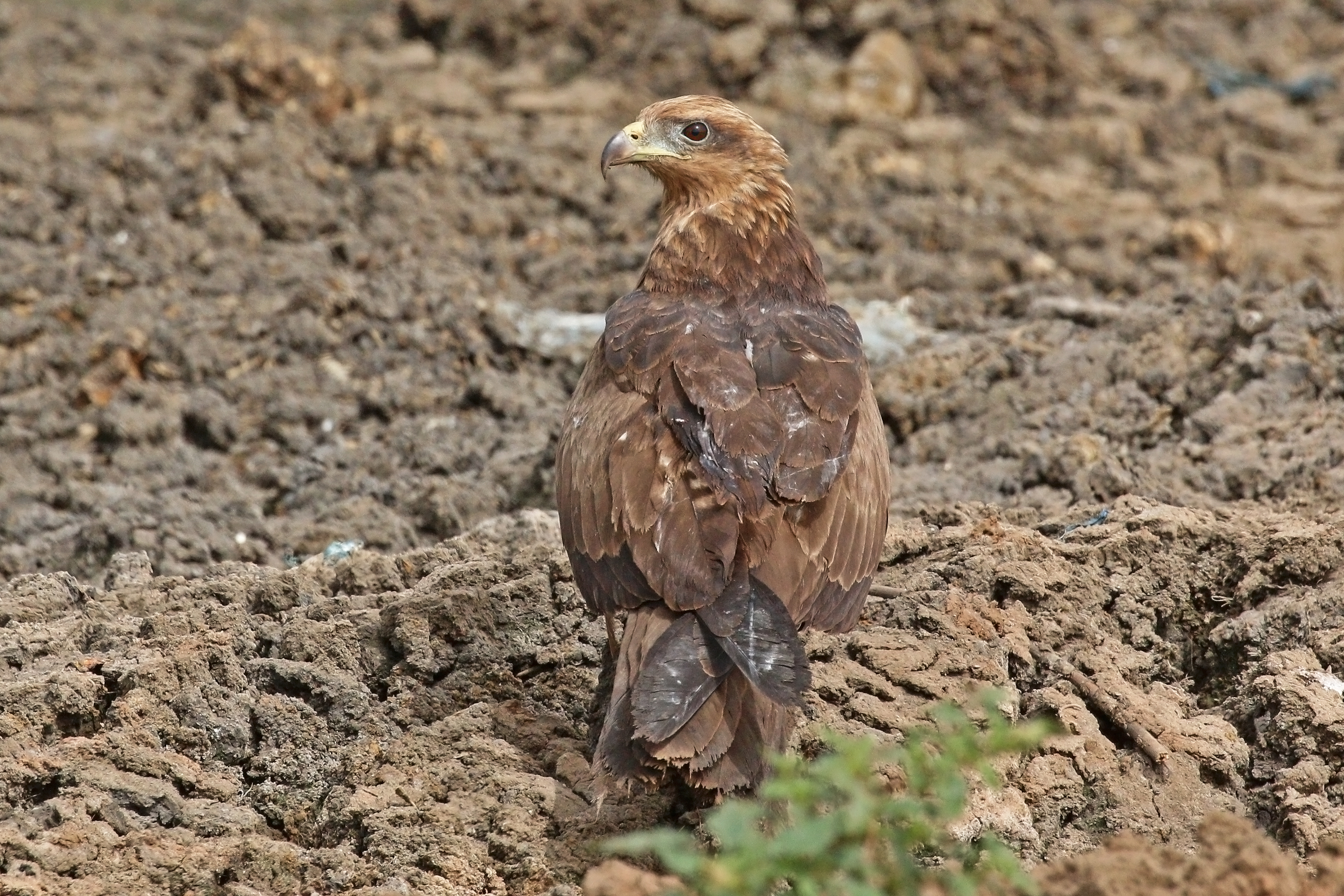
juvenile Milvus aegyptius parasitus, The Gambia

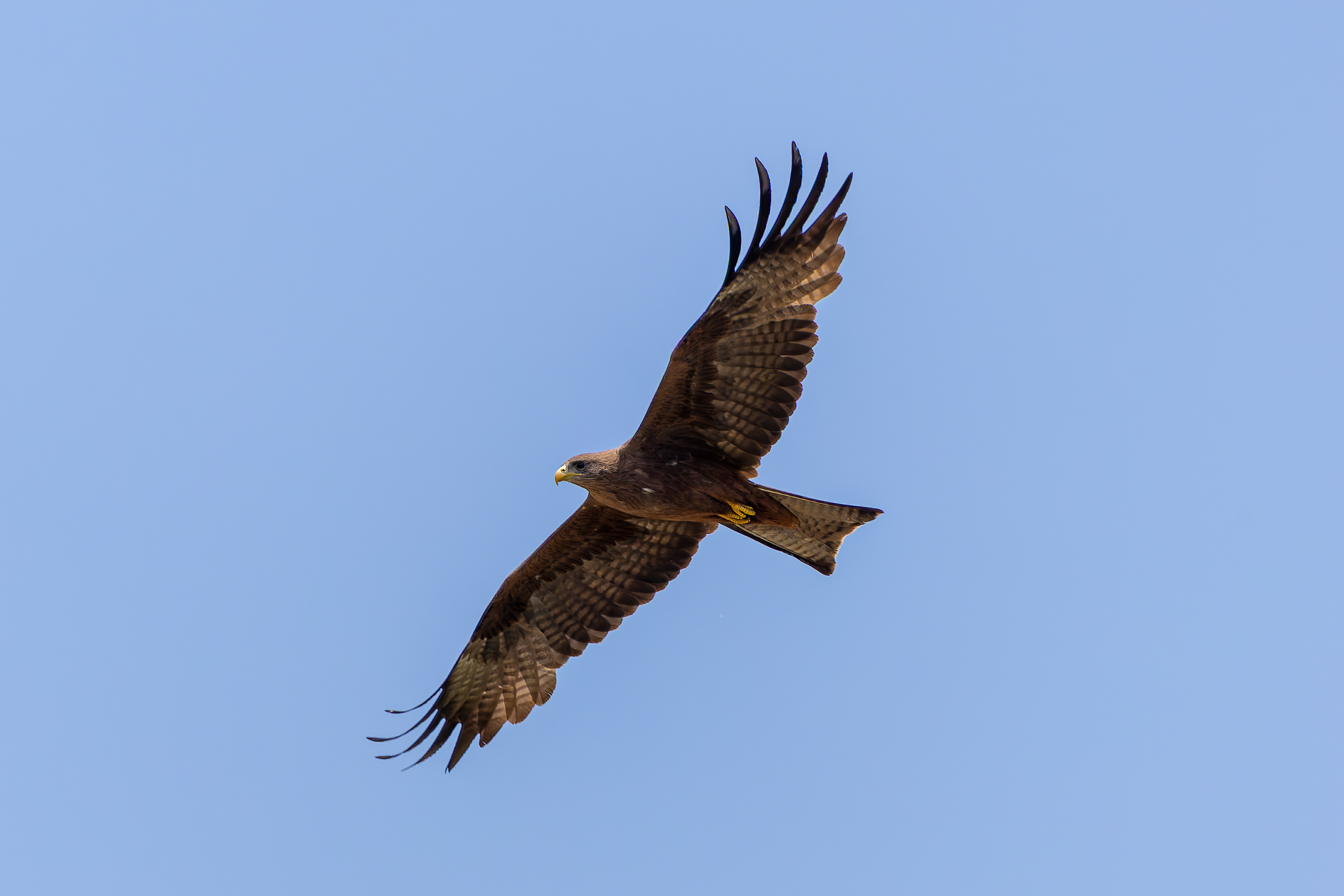
Milvus aegyptius, Tanzania

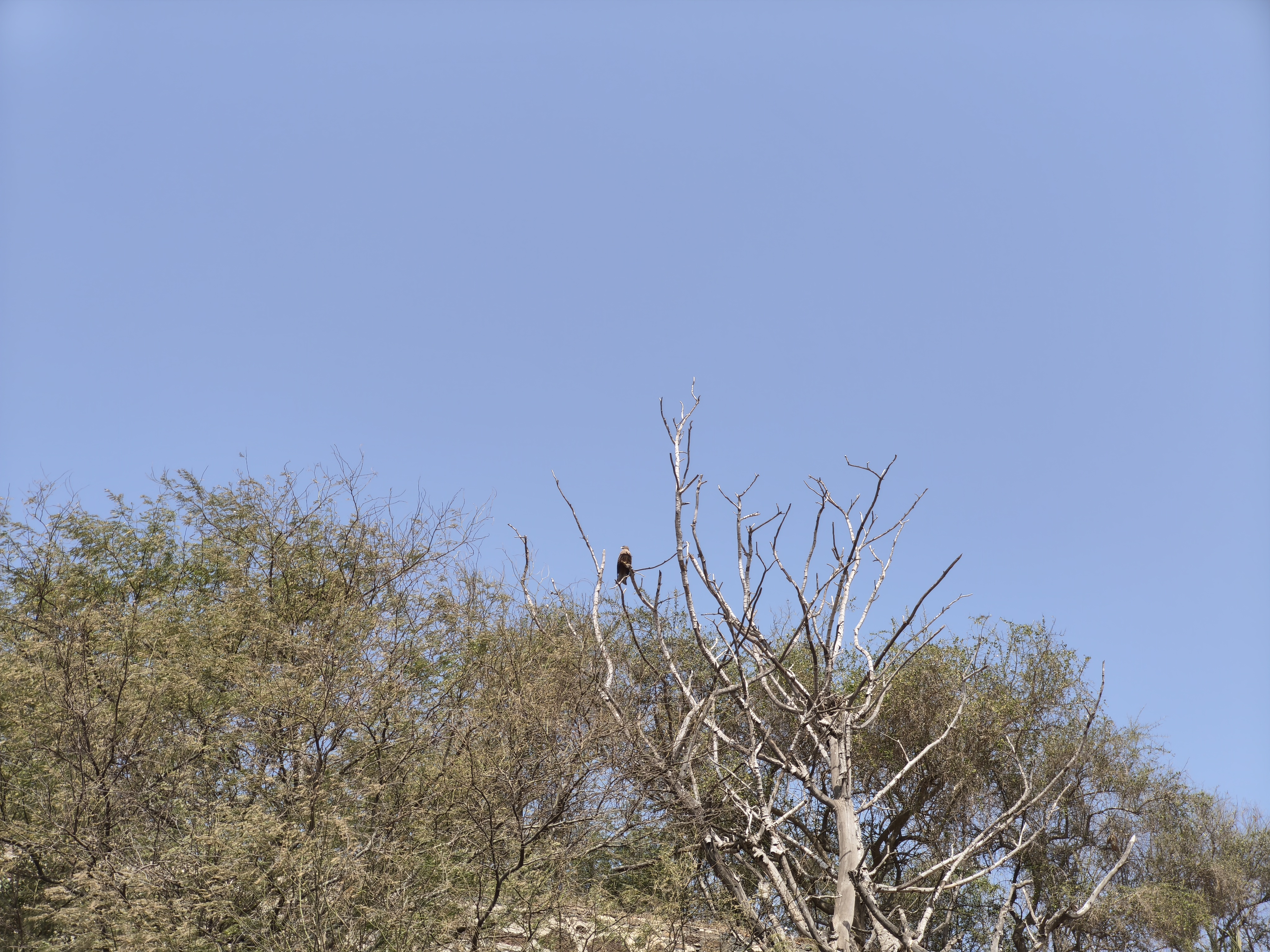
Yellow-billed kite on Gorée Island, Senegal
