= Cool Air, KwaZulu-Natal =

Cool Air
- Location within KwaZulu-Natal Location within South Africa
- Coordinates: 29.363°S 30.633°E
- Country: South Africa
- Province: KwaZulu-Natal
- District: UMgungundlovu
- Municipality: uMshwathi

Area
  - Total: 1.23 km^{2} (0.47 sq mi)

Population (2011)
  - Total: 2,570
  - Density: 2,090/km^{2} (5,410/sq mi)

Racial makeup (2011)
  - Black African: 51.3%
  - Coloured: 1.0%
  - Indian/Asian: 47.1%
  - White: 0.1%
  - Other: 0.5%

First languages (2011)
  - English: 52.1%
  - Zulu: 41.0%
  - Sotho: 1.8%
  - Afrikaans: 1.2%
  - Other: 4.0%
- Time zone: UTC+2 (SAST)
- PO box: 3236

Cool Air is a town in Umgungundlovu District Municipality in the KwaZulu-Natal province of South Africa.
