= Richmond, KwaZulu-Natal =

Richmond
- Location within KwaZulu-Natal Location within South Africa
- Coordinates: 29°52′S 30°16′E
- Country: South Africa
- Province: KwaZulu-Natal
- District: UMgungundlovu
- Municipality: Richmond
- Established: 1850

Area
  - Total: 3.14 km^{2} (1.21 sq mi)

Population (2011)
  - Total: 3,349
  - Density: 1,070/km^{2} (2,760/sq mi)

Racial makeup (2011)
  - Black African: 62.7%
  - Coloured: 9.6%
  - Indian/Asian: 16.8%
  - White: 9.9%
  - Other: 1.0%

First languages (2011)
  - Zulu: 49.2%
  - English: 38.2%
  - Xhosa: 3.3%
  - Afrikaans: 2.0%
  - Other: 7.4%
- Time zone: UTC+2 (SAST)
- Postal code (street): 3780
- PO box: 3780

Richmond is a town situated on the banks of the upper Lovu River in the Midlands of KwaZulu-Natal, South Africa.

== Geography ==
The town is located within the Richmond Local Municipality, forming part of the Umgungundlovu District Municipality and incorporates the former township of Ndaleni on the opposite bank of the Illovo River. Timber, sugarcane, poultry, citrus fruit and dairy goods are produced here. It is approximately 38 km south-west of Pietermaritzburg on the R56 road.

== History ==
Richmond was established in 1850 as Beaulieu-on-Illovo by British Byrne Settlers who were originally from New Forest/Beaulieu, in Hampshire.

Passages were obtained on J.C. Byrne and Co.’s Lady Bruce, and ‘the Duke’s people’, as they came to be known, were located on the Illovo river, not far from the Wesleyans’ Indaleni Mission Station This year

The expenses for wagon-hire to their allotments and survey fees were charges to the Duke's account by Moreland, and the Duke also met the costs of flour, tents, and seed. He even donated L100 to Pietermaritzburg's Anglican minister, the Revd James Green, to be used towards the construction of a church in their new settlement. Their rural allotments were on land which was given the name Beaulieu Estate, and Beaulieu was the name given to the village.

Because of the similarity of the names of the two entities, confusion arose with land titles, and before 1850 was out, the nearby village had been renamed Richmond, after the Duke's seat in Richmond, Surrey.

The arrival of the settlers brought about a slow return of various remnants of African people who fled the raiding Zulu armies. The Zulus called these refugees "amaBhaca", (people who hide). Although composed of elements of many different groups, the Bhaca have developed their own identity.

In February 1906 two British officers were killed at Byrne, near Richmond while involved in enforcing the collection of the hated Poll Tax from "recalcitrant districts". This incident, known as the Trewirgie Incident, precipitated the imposition of martial law and set off the Bambatha Rebellion.

One of Natal's greatest tycoons, Joseph Baynes, a Yorkshireman by birth, was a pioneer of the dairy industry. His Baynesfield Estate was bequeathed in his will to the nation of South Africa.

A good history of Richmond has been written by Coulson 1986. The town is controlled by the Dlamini family which have enormous wealth followed by the Mckenzies.

== Notable people ==
- Ebrahim Desai
- Harold Kitson
- Mhleli Dlamini
