= UMshwathi Local Municipality =

Coordinates: 29°25′53″S 30°34′50″E

uMshwathi
- Local municipality
- Seal
- Interactive map of uMshwathi
- Country: South Africa
- Province: KwaZulu-Natal
- District: uMgungundlovu
- Seat: Wartburg
- Wards: 14

Government
  - Type: Municipal council

Area
  - Total: 1,818 km^{2} (702 sq mi)

Population (2011)
  - Total: 106,374
  - Density: 58.51/km^{2} (151.5/sq mi)

Racial makeup (2011)
  - Black African: 95.1%
  - Coloured: 0.2%
  - Indian/Asian: 1.7%
  - White: 2.7%

First languages (2011)
  - Zulu: 89.6%
  - English: 4.9%
  - Sotho: 1.1%
  - Southern Ndebele: 1.0%
  - Other: 3.4%
- Time zone: UTC+2 (SAST)
- Municipal code: KZN221

UMshwathi Local Municipality is situated in UMgungundlovu District Municipality (UMDM) which is in the foothills of the province of KwaZulu-Natal, about 120 km northwest of Durban, geographically located between the N2 and the N3 highways. The municipality is the largest Municipality in the largest district of KZN out of the seven Local Municipalities which form UMDM.

== History ==
UMshwathi has a rich heritage of German immigration, evident in many place names. In the mid-19th century, farmers, missionaries, and other settlers from Germany came to settle here. Places with German names include Harburg, established in 1849, Kirchdorf, New Hanover, Lilienthal, Schroeders, and, in the neighboring local community, the town of Hermannsburg.

The Wartburger Hof, a German hotel and restaurant, remains an important point for tourism. In November 2007 the owners, Siggi Schaedle (68), and his wife Ingrid Schaedle (63) were gunned down at point blank range. Premier Mr Sibusiso Ndebele condemned the killing

Wartburg is named after Wartburg Castle in Germany, where Martin Luther translated the Bible into German.

== Location ==
The Municipality is advantageously situated between the major ports of Durban and Richards Bay and 90 km (along the R614) and 145 km (along the N3) from King Shaka International Airport and Dube Trade Port Company (DTPC). The Mdloti River headspring, Hazelmere Dam, Mvoti River are the primary water source for the North Coast and, are situated in uMshwathi. The Albert Falls and Nagle Dams are located partly within the Municipal boundaries.

The Municipality was created after the merger of previous Transitional Local Councils and Tribal Areas administered by the former Development Services Board. The area has four major urban centres in the area with a fifty emerging business hubs of Bhamshela. New Hanover is the administrative hub; four major rural residential settlements in the UMshwathi district have fourteen wards. The Municipality has 27 councillors, and the Ward Committees work in each ward to pro-mote civic involvement in local affairs.

The Municipality covers 1 811 square kilometres and has an estimated population of 111 645 people as reported in the 2016 community survey. It is the second most populous Local Municipality within uMgungundlovu District Municipality. On the National level, uMshwathi rank position 105 in terms of population. uMsunduzi is the most populous Municipality within the district with 679 038 people (community survey 2016). The Municipality was established in 2001 by amalgamating the Transitional Local Council (TLC) that existed before that period.

== Main places ==
The 2001 census divided the municipality into the following main places:

Place	Code	Area (km^{2})	Population
Albert Falls	50701	3.52	313
Bomvu	50702	6.61	590
Cool Air	50703	1.01	2,112
Dalton	50704	1.35	799
Gcumisa	50705	175.86	38,579
Mpolweni	50706	21.69	6,148
Mthuli	50707	59.14	10,925
Nadi Part 1	50708	4.91	1,393
Nadi Part 2	50717	9.48	646
Ndlovu	50709	6.06	1,206
New Hanover	50710	2.25	1,991
Ngubane	50711	40.89	6,498
Ntanzi	50712	32.28	2,201
Thokozane	50713	2.12	2,966
Trust Feed	50714	2.13	5,242
Wartburg	50716	1.87	905
Remainder of the municipality	50715	1,438.11	25,504

== Politics ==
The municipal council consists of twenty-seven members elected by mixed-member proportional representation. Fourteen councillors are elected by first-past-the-post voting in fourteen wards, while the remaining thirteen are chosen from party lists so that the total number of party representatives is proportional to the number of votes received.

In the election of 4 November 2026, no party won a majority. The uMkhonto weSizwe Party won the largest number of seats on the council, with thirteen.

The following table shows the results of the election.

Party	Ward			List			Total seats
Party	Votes	%	Seats	Votes	%	Seats	Total seats
uMkhonto weSizwe Party	16,186	46.82	11	16,374	47.24	2	13
African National Congress	11,349	32.83	2	11,226	32.39	7	9
Inkatha Freedom Party	3,077	8.90	0	3,174	9.16	3	3
Democratic Alliance	2,379	6.88	1	2,379	6.86	1	2
8 other parties	1,580	4.57	0	1,511	4.36	0	0
Total	34,571	100.00	14	34,664	100.00	13	27
Valid votes	34,571	98.43		34,664	98.72		
Invalid/blank votes	551	1.57		449	1.28		
Total votes	35,122	100.00		35,113	100.00		
Registered voters/turnout	62,194	56.47		62,194	56.46		
