= Wartburg, KwaZulu-Natal =

Town in KwaZulu-Natal, South Africa

Wartburg
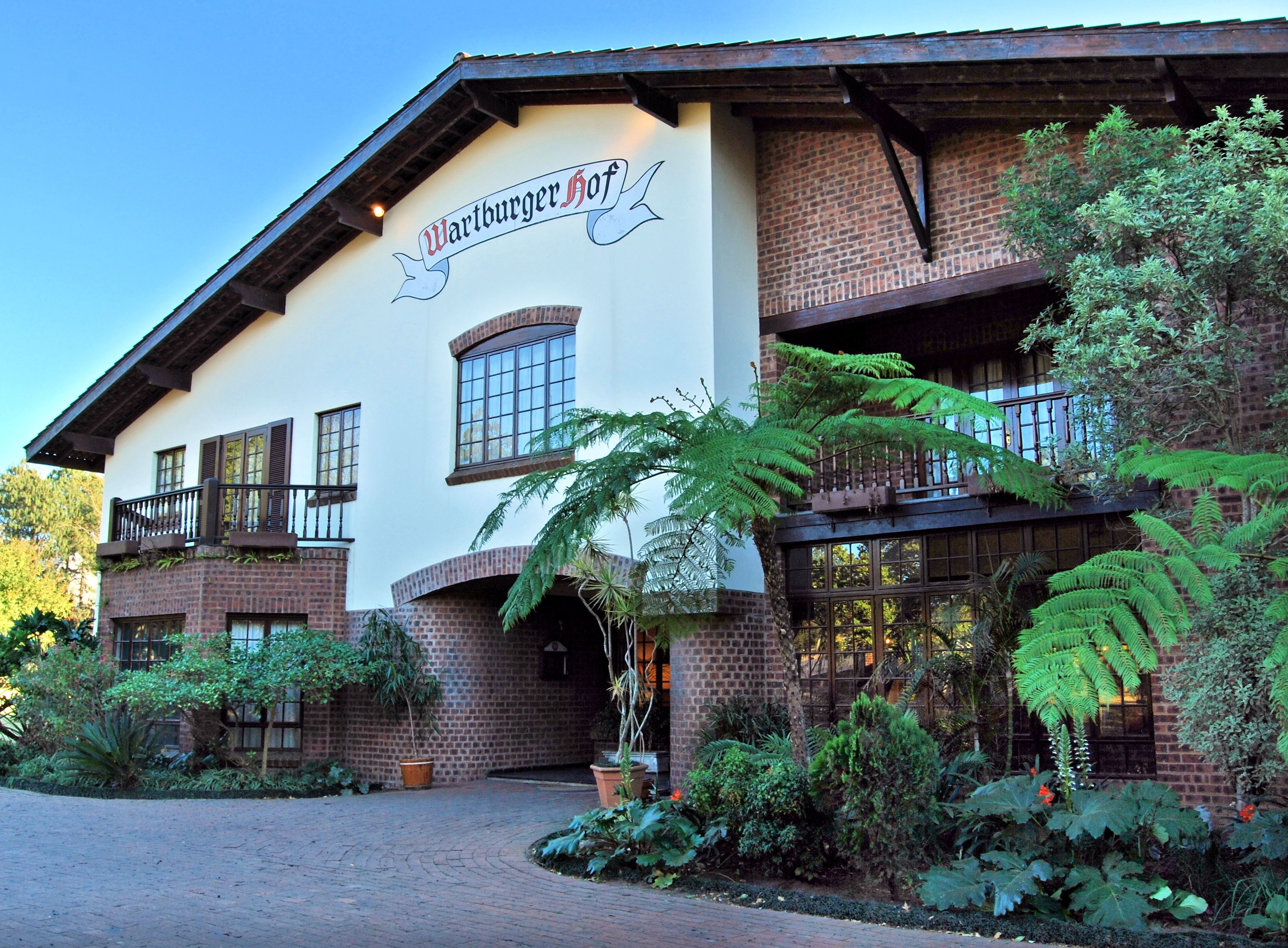
- Wartburger Hof Hotel

- Location within KwaZulu-Natal Location within South Africa
- Coordinates: 29°25′59″S 30°34′28″E
- Country: South Africa
- Province: KwaZulu-Natal
- District: UMgungundlovu
- Municipality: uMshwathi

Area
  - Total: 1.89 km^{2} (0.73 sq mi)

Population (2011)
  - Total: 906
  - Density: 479/km^{2} (1,240/sq mi)

Racial makeup (2011)
  - Black African: 26.4%
  - Coloured: 1.2%
  - Indian/Asian: 4.9%
  - White: 67.5%

First languages (2011)
  - English: 45.6%
  - Zulu: 22.7%
  - Afrikaans: 9.5%
  - Other: 22.3%
- Time zone: UTC+2 (SAST)
- Postal code (street): 3233
- PO box: 3233
- Area code: 033/032

Wartburg is a small town located 27 kilometres (17 mi) north-east of Pietermaritzburg and 50 kilometres (31 mi) south of Greytown in the uMshwathi Local Municipality of KwaZulu-Natal, South Africa.

The town was named after Wartburg castle in Thuringia where Martin Luther translated the Bible into German by the immigrant families who arrived in South Africa in 1848. A noticeable population of German-speaking citizens still live in the area surrounding the town.

The town is mostly supported by the surrounding agricultural industry, mostly sugar cane and timber production.

There are two schools that serve the town: Wartburg Kirchdorf School and Georgenau School, which originally was the Wartburg Kirchdorf Junior School. The Wartburg Kirchdorf School caters to students from pre-school right through till grade 12. The School has a wealth of facilities, having rugby fields, cricket fields, hockey fields, cricket nets, tennis courts, a swimming pool, and an athletics track and equipment, and a library.
