= Richmond Local Municipality elections =

Local elections in KwaZulu-Natal, South Africa

The Richmond Local Municipality council consists of seventeen members elected by mixed-member proportional representation. Nine councillors are elected by first-past-the-post voting in nine wards, while the remaining eight are chosen from party lists so that the total number of party representatives is proportional to the number of votes received.

In the election of 4 November 2026 the uMkhonto weSizwe Party (MKP) won a majority of ten seats.

== Results ==
The following table shows the composition of the council after past elections.

Event	ANC	DA	EFF	IFP	MKP	UDM	Other	Total
2000 election	9	1	—	2	—	1	0	13
2006 election	10	1	—	1	—	1	0	13
2011 election	11	1	—	0	—	1	1	14
2016 election	11	2	1	0	—	0	0	14
2021 election	9	1	2	1	—	0	1	14
2026 election	5	2	0	0	10	—	0	17

== December 2000 election ==
The following table shows the results of the 2000 election.

Party	Ward			List			Total seats
Party	Votes	%	Seats	Votes	%	Seats	Total seats
African National Congress	7,166	67.01	6	7,320	68.24	3	9
Inkatha Freedom Party	1,246	11.65	0	1,248	11.63	2	2
United Democratic Movement	1,050	9.82	1	1,106	10.31	0	1
Democratic Alliance	969	9.06	0	1,053	9.82	1	1
Independent candidates	263	2.46	0				0
Total	10,694	100.00	7	10,727	100.00	6	13
Valid votes	10,694	95.70		10,727	96.05		
Invalid/blank votes	480	4.30		441	3.95		
Total votes	11,174	100.00		11,168	100.00		
Registered voters/turnout	22,248	50.22		22,248	50.20		

== March 2006 election ==
The following table shows the results of the 2006 election.

Party	Ward			List			Total seats
Party	Votes	%	Seats	Votes	%	Seats	Total seats
African National Congress	9,155	73.02	7	9,310	73.80	3	10
United Democratic Movement	1,198	9.56	0	1,259	9.98	1	1
Inkatha Freedom Party	1,198	9.56	0	1,179	9.35	1	1
Democratic Alliance	718	5.73	0	743	5.89	1	1
Independent candidates	214	1.71	0				0
National Democratic Convention	54	0.43	0	124	0.98	0	0
Total	12,537	100.00	7	12,615	100.00	6	13
Valid votes	12,537	96.39		12,615	96.76		
Invalid/blank votes	469	3.61		422	3.24		
Total votes	13,006	100.00		13,037	100.00		
Registered voters/turnout	25,240	51.53		25,240	51.65		

== May 2011 election ==
The following table shows the results of the 2011 election.

Party	Ward			List			Total seats
Party	Votes	%	Seats	Votes	%	Seats	Total seats
African National Congress	11,923	69.62	6	13,029	82.23	5	11
Independent candidates	2,373	13.86	1				1
Democratic Alliance	1,034	6.04	0	1,071	6.76	1	1
United Democratic Movement	816	4.76	0	756	4.77	1	1
Inkatha Freedom Party	534	3.12	0	536	3.38	0	0
National Freedom Party	430	2.51	0	396	2.50	0	0
African Christian Democratic Party	17	0.10	0	56	0.35	0	0
Total	17,127	100.00	7	15,844	100.00	7	14
Valid votes	17,127	97.08		15,844	89.79		
Invalid/blank votes	515	2.92		1,801	10.21		
Total votes	17,642	100.00		17,645	100.00		
Registered voters/turnout	28,729	61.41		28,729	61.42		

== August 2016 election ==
The following table shows the results of the 2016 election.

Party	Ward			List			Total seats
Party	Votes	%	Seats	Votes	%	Seats	Total seats
African National Congress	14,240	75.39	7	14,532	76.68	4	11
Democratic Alliance	2,106	11.15	0	2,060	10.87	2	2
Economic Freedom Fighters	1,174	6.22	0	1,085	5.72	1	1
United Democratic Movement	627	3.32	0	617	3.26	0	0
Inkatha Freedom Party	619	3.28	0	569	3.00	0	0
People's Revolutionary Movement	61	0.32	0	89	0.47	0	0
Independent candidates	61	0.32	0				0
Total	18,888	100.00	7	18,952	100.00	7	14
Valid votes	18,888	98.10		18,952	98.23		
Invalid/blank votes	366	1.90		341	1.77		
Total votes	19,254	100.00		19,293	100.00		
Registered voters/turnout	32,165	59.86		32,165	59.98		

== November 2021 election ==
The following table shows the results of the 2021 election.

Party	Ward			List			Total seats
Party	Votes	%	Seats	Votes	%	Seats	Total seats
African National Congress	11,027	68.68	6	11,244	70.86	3	9
Economic Freedom Fighters	1,889	11.77	0	1,961	12.36	2	2
Democratic Alliance	1,051	6.55	0	1,120	7.06	1	1
Independent candidates	1,251	7.79	1				1
Inkatha Freedom Party	231	1.44	0	836	5.27	1	1
Patriotic Alliance	156	0.97	0	202	1.27	0	0
United Democratic Movement	135	0.84	0	135	0.85	0	0
African Transformation Movement	125	0.78	0	142	0.89	0	0
People's Freedom Party	110	0.69	0	127	0.80	0	0
Abantu Batho Congress	80	0.50	0	102	0.64	0	0
Total	16,055	100.00	7	15,869	100.00	7	14
Valid votes	16,055	98.06		15,869	97.69		
Invalid/blank votes	318	1.94		375	2.31		
Total votes	16,373	100.00		16,244	100.00		
Registered voters/turnout	32,562	50.28		32,562	49.89		

=== By-elections from November 2021 ===
The following by-elections were held to fill vacant ward seats in the period from November 2021.

Date	Ward	Party of the previous councillor	Party of the newly elected councillor
12 Mar 2025	2	African National Congress	uMkhonto weSizwe

== November 2026 election ==
The following table shows the results of the 2026 election.

Party	Ward			List			Total seats
Party	Votes	%	Seats	Votes	%	Seats	Total seats
uMkhonto weSizwe Party	12,183	56.26	8	12,179	56.28	2	10
African National Congress	6,533	30.17	1	6,521	30.13	4	5
Democratic Alliance	1,972	9.11	0	1,865	8.62	2	2
Inkatha Freedom Party	488	2.25	0	560	2.59	0	0
Economic Freedom Fighters	210	0.97	0	219	1.01	0	0
South African Communist Party	84	0.39	0	77	0.36	0	0
Afrika Mayibuye Movement	85	0.39	0	64	0.30	0	0
African Transformation Movement	13	0.06	0	64	0.30	0	0
Independent Councillors	60	0.28	0	16	0.07	0	0
Patriotic Alliance	11	0.05	0	56	0.26	0	0
Bumbana Mzansi	16	0.07	0	19	0.09	0	0
Total	21,655	100.00	9	21,640	100.00	8	17
Valid votes	21,655	99.14		21,640	99.28		
Invalid/blank votes	188	0.86		158	0.72		
Total votes	21,843	100.00		21,798	100.00		
Registered voters/turnout	38,506	56.73		38,506	56.61		
