= Impendle =

- Location within KwaZulu-Natal Location within South Africa
- Coordinates: 29.6019°S 29.865°E
- Country: South Africa
- Province: KwaZulu-Natal
- District: UMgungundlovu
- Municipality: Impendle

Area
  - Total: 0.86 km^{2} (0.33 sq mi)

Population (2011)
  - Total: 230
  - Density: 270/km^{2} (690/sq mi)

Racial makeup (2011)
  - Black African: 91.3%
  - Indian/Asian: 5.7%
  - Other: 3.0%

First languages (2011)
  - Zulu: 80.9%
  - English: 3.5%
  - Xhosa: 3.0%
  - Sotho: 1.7%
  - Other: 10.9%
- Time zone: UTC+2 (SAST)
- Postal code (street): 3227
- PO box: 3227
- Area code: 033

Impendle is a town in Umgungundlovu District Municipality in the KwaZulu-Natal province of South Africa.

Impendle town is 48 km west of Pietermaritzburg and 37 km north-east of Bulwer. It was founded in 1894 and since 1948 has been administered by a health committee. The name, of Zulu origin, means ‘uncovered’ or ‘exposed’, referring to a hill west of the town.

The Impendle Local Municipality is located within the uMgungundlovu District in KwaZulu-Natal. It is Category B municipality. It is distance away from the major tourist and trade routes, even though two important roads mark its borders. The road inter-linking Pietermaritzburg and Underberg serves as an important access route to the Southern Drakensberg. Drakensberg is a popular tourist destination, and is situated and runs alongside Impendle's southern boundary. The connecting road between Mooi River and Underberg, which is an alternative tourist route, travels along the municipality's north-western boundary.

The Impendle area is extremely diverse in its topography, climate and soil, and has a rich and complex natural environment. The local people in the villages are known for farming to provide for their families. Its location at the foot of the Drakensberg makes Impendle a highland area and a major source of water within the KwaZulu-Natal Province. It is in the catchment area of the uMkhomazi River in the south and the Mngeni River in the north-east. High-density settlements occur around Impendle Town, in villages such as Gomane, Mkhomaze, Kwa Gade, Ntwasahlobo, Stoffelton, Clerance, Kwa Thunzi, Kwa Novuka, Nhlabamkosi, Similobha, Stepmore, Lotheni, Inzinga and Kamensi.

The closest towns from Impendle town are Underburg which is a town known for farming, and Pietermaritzburg. The Impendle town also houses Transport, a clinic; as well as the municipal library. The Impendle Primary School offers pre-primary and primary education. Churches in town include the Catholic Church, and The Methodist Church.

The small town is still one of the developing places in South Africa as it has no tar roads, water and electricity in certain villages of the area. Impendle is mainly dominated by the Zulu tribe. It is assigned the registration plate NIM (Natal IMpendle).
