= Albert Falls =

- Location within KwaZulu-Natal Location within South Africa
- Coordinates: 29.438°S 30.428°E
- Country: South Africa
- Province: KwaZulu-Natal
- District: UMgungundlovu
- Municipality: uMshwathi

Area
  - Total: 7.03 km^{2} (2.71 sq mi)

Population (2011)
  - Total: 4,536
  - Density: 645/km^{2} (1,670/sq mi)

Racial makeup (2011)
  - Black African: 96.4%
  - Coloured: 0.2%
  - Indian/Asian: 0.8%
  - White: 2.3%
  - Other: 0.3%

First languages (2011)
  - Zulu: 92.5%
  - English: 3.9%
  - Sotho: 1.3%
  - Other: 2.4%
- Time zone: UTC+2 (SAST)

Albert Falls is a town in Umgungundlovu District Municipality in the KwaZulu-Natal province of South Africa. It is next to the Albert Falls Game Reserve and the Albert Falls Dam.
