= Impendle Local Municipality =

Coordinates: 29°35′54″S 29°52′04″E

Impendle Impendle
- Local municipality
- Seal

- Location in KwaZulu-Natal
- Country: South Africa
- Province: KwaZulu-Natal
- District: uMgungundlovu
- Seat: Impendle
- Wards: 6

Government
  - Type: Municipal council
  - Mayor: Buyisani Mlaba

Area
  - Total: 1,528 km^{2} (590 sq mi)

Population (2011)
  - Total: 33,105
  - Density: 21.67/km^{2} (56.11/sq mi)

Racial makeup (2011)
  - Black African: 98.9%
  - Coloured: 0.3%
  - Indian/Asian: 0.1%
  - White: 0.5%

First languages (2011)
  - Zulu: 93.3%
  - English: 1.8%
  - Sotho: 1.6%
  - Southern Ndebele: 1.2%
  - Other: 2.1%
- Time zone: UTC+2 (SAST)
- Municipal code: KZN224

Impendle Municipality (Zulu: UMasipala wase Impendle) is a local municipality within the Umgungundlovu District Municipality, in the KwaZulu-Natal province of South Africa. During the 18th century, the Griquas ("Abatwas") used to hide in the mountain in the area because they were accused of stealing livestock from the farmers who decided to fight the Griquas in order to protect their livestock. The Griquas used war spears, and this conflict was called "an outside war", i.e. impiyasendle or impiendle.

The municipality is extremely diverse in its topography, climate and soils, and has a rich and complex natural environment. High-density settlements occur around Impendle, in villages such as Gomane, KwaNovuka, Similobha and Kamensi.

== Main places ==
The 2001 census divided the municipality into the following main places:

Place	Code	Area (km^{2})	Population
Batlokoa	51001	13.14	675
Impendle Part 1	51005	20.39	1,562
Impendle Part 2	51006	1.25	238
Nxamalala	51003	234.17	28,661
Polela	51004	2.53	189
Remainder of the municipality	51002	674.08	2,255

== Politics ==
The municipal council consists of eleven members elected by mixed-member proportional representation. Six councillors are elected by first-past-the-post voting in six wards, while the remaining five are chosen from party lists so that the total number of party representatives is proportional to the number of votes received.

In the election of 4 November 2026 the uMkhonto weSizwe Party (MKP) won a majority of six seats on the council.

The following table shows the results of the 2026 election.

Party	Ward			List			Total seats
Party	Votes	%	Seats	Votes	%	Seats	Total seats
uMkhonto weSizwe Party	4,421	42.38	6	4,468	42.84	0	6
African National Congress	2,751	26.37	0	2,750	26.37	2	2
Democratic Alliance	1,240	11.89	0	1,282	12.29	1	1
Inkatha Freedom Party	876	8.40	0	872	8.36	1	1
Independent Councillors	771	7.39	0	704	6.75	1	1
7 other parties	373	3.58	0	354	3.39	0	0
Total	10,432	100.00	6	10,430	100.00	5	11
Valid votes	10,432	98.95		10,430	99.11		
Invalid/blank votes	111	1.05		94	0.89		
Total votes	10,543	100.00		10,524	100.00		
Registered voters/turnout	18,597	56.69		18,597	56.59		
