= Frank Dutton =

South African police officer (1949–2022)

Personal details
- Born: 20 May 1949 Warmbaths, Transvaal, South Africa
- Died: 20 January 2022 (aged 72) Hillcrest, South Africa

Frank Kennan Dutton (20 May 1949 – 20 January 2022) was a South African police officer. The dominant theme in his career was the investigation and prosecution of people guilty of committing war crimes and crimes against humanity during South Africa's apartheid era. Dutton's work took place in South Africa as well as abroad. In South Africa, he helped expose the apartheid military's destabilisation machinery, and later headed the Scorpions, the country's elite police force. He also worked with the International Criminal Tribunal for the former Yugoslavia.

== Early life and education ==
Frank Kennan Dutton was born on 20 May 1949 in Warmbaths, Transvaal Province, in the Union of South Africa(later Bela-Bela, Limpopo province).

He was educated at Boys Town‚ Magaliesburg.

After leaving school aged 17, Dutton joined the South African Police (SAP) to be trained as a police officer.

== Career ==
After completing police training, he was posted to Kwazulu-Natal.

=== Uncovering the Third Force ===
Dutton, with his teammate Lwandle Wilson Magadla, solved the case of the Trust Feed massacre, a massacre in a village of supporters of the African National Congress in the township Trust Feed in Natal in December 1988. Taking on the system they worked for, Dutton and Magadla sent a prominent policeman Brian Victor Mitchell to prison for this in 1992, the first senior policeman during the anti-apartheid struggle to be tried and sentenced. Subsequently, his superiors Ronnie van der Westhuizen and Christo Marx discouraged him and dissolved his unit. But Dutton continued to expose the involvement of the apartheid-era South African Police hit squads and the "Third Force" involvement of the South African Defence Force in destabilising large areas of South Africa.

In 1992, on the recommendation of Jacob Zuma, Richard Goldstone appointed Dutton the chief investigator for the Goldstone Commission, a judicial commission looking into political violence. This led to the exposure of the workings of the Third Force, and the imprisonment of security police colonel Eugene de Kock, known as "Prime Evil". Goldstone said of Dutton: "He is a man without strong political feelings but with a deep belief in the need for complete integrity in police investigations, regardless of the consequences."

In 1995, Dutton became the head of the Investigation Task Unit of the Truth and Reconciliation Commission. He investigated and arrested the former defence minister Magnus Malan and 10 former military officials in connection with the 1987 KwaMakhutha massacre.

Dutton exposed the shadowy relationship between the special forces of the South African Defence Force and Renamo rebels in Mozambique. He showed this as continuing for many years after the non-aggression Nkomati Accord was signed between South Africa and Mozambique in 1984. Three of the accused – Brigadier Cornelius van Niekerk, Brigadier John More and Colonel Cornelius van Tonder – were directly involved in coordinating support for Renamo in direct violation of the Nkomati Accord.

=== Investigations in the former Yugoslavia ===
In 1994, on the recommendation of Richard Goldstone, chief prosecutor of the International Criminal Tribunal for the former Yugoslavia, Dutton successfully applied for a post with the United Nations in the investigation section of the Office of the Prosecutor for that tribunal at The Hague, Netherlands. In this role, he worked with detectives from more than 90 countries and proved himself to be a world-class detective. In 1995, he was promoted to head of the court's investigating mission in Sarajevo. He was again promoted to Commander of Field Operations in Kosovo in 1999, when Director of Public Prosecutions Bulelani Ngcuka asked him to return to South Africa to set up the elite unit, the Scorpions.

=== Setting up the Scorpions ===
In 2000 before his retirement, he set up the Scorpions, the Directorate of Special Operations, modelled after the American Untouchables and Federal Bureau of Investigation. Dutton was at the time the only member of the organisation with a public image, and gave it its motto: "Loved by the people, feared by criminals, respected by peers." This once again placed him in the firing line.

== Later life and death ==
In October 2007, Dutton was selected to serve on the panel to review the case against police National Commissioner Jackie Selebi.

In October 2011, Seychelles police announced that Dutton had been appointed to create an elite police unit against serious crime there.

In the 2010s, Dutton acted as a private investigator for several legal cases about political violence in the 1980s. He was approached by the family of Nokuthula Simelane, an uMkhonto we Sizwe fighter who went missing in 1983, to find the truth about her death. In 2015, Dutton submitted an affidavit (along with another affidavit from the former Truth and Reconciliation Commission member Dumisa Ntsebeza) saying that state-sanctioned extrajudicial killings had become part and parcel of the apartheid regime, particularly the police, during the 1980s. This led to several police officers being prosecuted for murdering her. Similarly, Dutton investigated for the reopened inquest into Neil Aggett's 1982 death in detention, after being approached by the Foundation for Human Rights in South Africa in 2015.

In September 2015, Dutton was appointed to the National Planning Commission of South Africa.

In 2019, Dutton started serving as the lead investigator for the Zondo Commission, a public inquiry into alleged state capture, corruption, and fraud.

Dutton died at a hospital in Hillcrest from a heart attack on 20 January 2022, at the age of 72. He also suffered a stroke few days prior to his death.

On 6 February 2022, the 40th anniversary of Neil Aggett's death in custody, there was a commemoration to honour Aggett at Westpark Cemetery, organised by the Kathrada Foundation. His de facto widow Liz Floyd addressed the group, and paid tribute to Dutton, George Bizos, and Max Coleman, who fought for justice for Aggett and other detainees.

== Recognition and honours ==
Dutton was awarded the Order of the Baobab.

On Freedom Day 2012, Dutton was awarded the Order of the Baobab in Gold, with the citation: "for his exceptional contribution to and achievement in his investigative work as a dedicated and loyal policeman, for exposing the apartheid government’s "Third Force", for his role in working for peace in KwaZulu-Natal, his international work in investigating and exposing war crimes and crimes against humanity in Bosnia‚ Kosovo and Darfur and assisting in establishing the causes of violence in East Timor and Sudan". He received this honour at the same time as his late long-time friend Lwandle Wilson Magadla, who was honoured posthumously.
