= Ngubane =

Ngubane is a South African surname that may refer to

- Ben Ngubane (1941–2021), South African politician
- Menzi Ngubane (born 1964), South African actor
- Mlungisi Ngubane (born 1956), South African football player and coach
- Siegfried Ngubane, South African Anglican bishop
- Silindile Ngubane (born 1987), South African football striker
- Sizani Ngubane, South African rural women's rights activist
