= New Hanover, KwaZulu-Natal =

New Hanover
- Location within KwaZulu-Natal Location within South Africa
- Coordinates: 29°21′S 30°32′E
- Country: South Africa
- Province: KwaZulu-Natal
- District: uMgungundlovu
- Municipality: umshwathi

Area
  - Total: 2.65 km^{2} (1.02 sq mi)

Population (2011)
  - Total: 3,175
  - Density: 1,200/km^{2} (3,100/sq mi)

Racial makeup (2011)
  - Black African: 92.7%
  - Coloured: 0.9%
  - Indian/Asian: 1.5%
  - White: 4.7%
  - Other: 0.3%

First languages (2011)
  - Zulu: 90.3
  - English: 4.9%
  - S.Sotho: 1.6%
  - Afrikaans: 0.8%
- Time zone: UTC+2 (SAST)
- PO box: 3230
- Area code: 033

New Hanover is a small town in the midlands of KwaZulu-Natal, South Africa, 35 kilometres (22 mi) north-east of Pietermaritzburg and 37 kilometres (23 mi) south of Greytown. It was founded in 1850 and has been administered by a health committee since 1933. It was named after city of Hanover in Germany by the German settlers.

Today this area's principal economy is the sugarcane industry, while the farming of fruits, grains and timber also feature prominently.
