= Richmond Local Municipality =

Coordinates: 29°52′19″S 30°16′19″E

Richmond
- Local municipality
- Seal

- Location in KwaZulu-Natal
- Country: South Africa
- Province: KwaZulu-Natal
- District: uMgungundlovu
- Seat: Richmond
- Wards: 9

Government
  - Type: Municipal council
  - Mayor: Bonginkosi Ngcongo

Area
  - Total: 1,256 km^{2} (485 sq mi)

Population (2011)
  - Total: 65,793
  - Density: 52.38/km^{2} (135.7/sq mi)

Racial makeup (2011)
  - Black African: 95.2%
  - Coloured: 0.9%
  - Indian/Asian: 1.1%
  - White: 2.6%

First languages (2011)
  - Zulu: 86.3%
  - English: 5.2%
  - Xhosa: 2.6%
  - Sotho: 2.2%
  - Other: 3.7%
- Time zone: UTC+2 (SAST)
- Municipal code: KZN227

Richmond Municipality (Zulu: UMasipala wase Richmond) is a local municipality within the Umgungundlovu District Municipality, in the KwaZulu-Natal province of South Africa.

Richmond was named after the Earl of Richmond, father in law of Sir Peregrine Maitland, Governor of the Cape from 1844 to 1847.

== Main places ==
The 2001 census divided the municipality into the following main places:

Place	Code	Area (km^{2})	Population
Esiphahleni	51301	18.25	2,847
Richmond	51305	37.38	14,162
Vumakwenza	51303	101.88	10,790
Vumindaba	51304	26.84	20,367
Remainder of the municipality	51302	1,047.71	15,050

== Politics ==
The municipal council consists of seventeen members elected by mixed-member proportional representation. Nine councillors are elected by first-past-the-post voting in nine wards, while the remaining eight are chosen from party lists so that the total number of party representatives is proportional to the number of votes received.

In the election of 4 November 2026 the uMkhonto weSizwe Party (MKP) won a majority of ten seats on the council.

The following table shows the results of the election.

Party	Ward			List			Total seats
Party	Votes	%	Seats	Votes	%	Seats	Total seats
uMkhonto weSizwe Party	12,183	56.26	8	12,179	56.28	2	10
African National Congress	6,533	30.17	1	6,521	30.13	4	5
Democratic Alliance	1,972	9.11	0	1,865	8.62	2	2
8 other parties	967	4.47	0	1,075	4.97	0	0
Total	21,655	100.00	9	21,640	100.00	8	17
Valid votes	21,655	99.14		21,640	99.28		
Invalid/blank votes	188	0.86		158	0.72		
Total votes	21,843	100.00		21,798	100.00		
Registered voters/turnout	38,506	56.73		38,506	56.61		
