= Mthuli =

Mthuli is a masculine given name. Notable people with the name include:

- Mthuli ka Shezi (1947–1972), South African playwright and political activist
- Mthuli Ncube (born 1964), Zimbabwean Finance Minister
