= Umgungundlovu District Municipality =

uMgungundlovu Indlovu District
- District municipality
- Seal

- Location in South Africa
- Coordinates: 29°35′S 30°22′E
- Country: South Africa
- Province: KwaZulu-Natal
- Seat: Pietermaritzburg
- Local municipalities: List: uMshwathi; uMngeni; Mpofana; Impendle; Msunduzi; Mkhambathini; Richmond

Government
  - Type: Municipal council
  - Mayor: Thobekile Maphumulo

Area
  - Total: 9,513 km^{2} (3,673 sq mi)

Population (2011)
  - Total: 1,017,763
  - Density: 107.0/km^{2} (277.1/sq mi)

Racial makeup (2011)
  - Black African: 84.7%
  - Coloured: 2.0%
  - Indian/Asian: 6.7%
  - White: 6.3%

First languages (2011)
  - Zulu: 76.4%
  - English: 15.3%
  - Xhosa: 1.9%
  - Sotho: 1.7%
  - Other: 4.7%
- Time zone: UTC+2 (SAST)
- Municipal code: DC22

uMgungundlovu is one of the 11 district municipalities ("districts") of KwaZulu-Natal province. The seat of uMgungundlovu is Pietermaritzburg. The majority of its 1 million+ residents speak Zulu (2001 Census). The district code is DC22.

== Geography ==
=== Neighbours ===
uMgungundlovu is surrounded by:

- eThekwini to the southeast (Durban)
- iLembe to the east (DC29)
- Sisonke to the southwest (DC43)
- Ugu to the south (DC21)
- Umzinyathi to the north (DC24)
- Uthukela to the northwest (DC23)

=== Local municipalities ===
The district contains the following local municipalities:

Local municipality	Population	%
Msunduzi	618,536	60.77%
uMshwathi	106,374	10.46%
uMngeni	92,710	9.11%
Richmond	65,793	6.46%
Mkhambathini	63,142	6.20%
Mpofana	38,103	3.75%
Impendle	33,105	3.25%

== Demographics ==
The following statistics are from the 2011 census.

Language	Population	%
Zulu	762,751	76.4%
English	152,981	15.3%
Xhosa	18,906	1.9%
Sotho	17,344	1.7%
Afrikaans	15,729	1.6%
Ndebele	10,051	1.0%
Other	7,764	0.8%
Tswana	4,521	0.45%
Northern Sotho	1,904	0.2%
Swati	482	0.05%
Tsonga	470	0.05%
Venda	342	0.03%

=== Gender ===
Gender	Population	%
Female	531,843	52.26%
Male	485,920	47.74%

=== Ethnic group ===
Ethnic group	Population	%
Black African	862,543	84.75%
Indian/Asian	68,029	6.68%
White	63,935	6.28%
Coloured	20,538	2.02%

=== Age ===
Age	Population	%
000 - 004	87 368	9.42%
005 - 009	98 509	10.62%
010 - 014	102 973	11.10%
015 - 019	104 574	11.27%
020 - 024	92 140	9.93%
025 - 029	87 922	9.48%
030 - 034	68 334	7.36%
035 - 039	61 487	6.63%
040 - 044	50 672	5.46%
045 - 049	43 148	4.65%
050 - 054	36 157	3.90%
055 - 059	25 434	2.74%
060 - 064	22 412	2.42%
065 - 069	15 980	1.72%
070 - 074	13 792	1.49%
075 - 079	8 079	0.87%
080 - 084	5 769	0.62%
085 - 089	1 834	0.20%
090 - 094	798	0.09%
095 - 099	321	0.03%
100 plus	131	0.01%

== Politics ==
=== Election results ===
Election results for Umgungundlovu in the South African general election, 2004.

- Population 18 and over: 575 772 [62.06% of total population]
- Total votes: 280 991 [30.28% of total population]
- Voting % estimate: 48.80% votes as a % of population 18 and over

Party	Votes	%
African National Congress	181 753	64.68%
Inkhata Freedom Party	46 687	16.62%
Democratic Alliance	30 910	11.00%
African Christian Democratic Party	6 085	2.17%
United Democratic Movement	3 531	1.26%
Independent Democrats	3 450	1.23%
Minority Front	2 106	0.75%
New National Party	1 723	0.61%
Freedom Front Plus	848	0.30%
Pan African Congress	673	0.24%
Azanian People's Organisation	627	0.22%
United Christian Democratic Party	530	0.19%
SOPA	363	0.13%
CDP	362	0.13%
UF	286	0.10%
NA	214	0.08%
EMSA	209	0.07%
TOP	206	0.07%
PJC	200	0.07%
KISS	154	0.05%
NLP	74	0.03%
Total	280 991	100.00%

== See also ==
- Municipal Demarcation Board
