= Seaside resort =

Resort located on the coast

A seaside resort is a town, village, or hotel that serves its purpose as a vacation resort and is located on a coast. Sometimes the concept includes an aspect of an official accreditation based on the satisfaction of certain requirements such as in the German Seebad. (Note: Seebad is a name for places with bathing culture and bathing tourism on the seashore. In Germany it is also a rating for health resorts that is given by the federal states. The prestigious title can be given to localities in which medical facilities are available for the implementation of spa measures.Seebad) Where a beach is the primary focus for tourists, it may be referred to as a beach resort.

== History ==
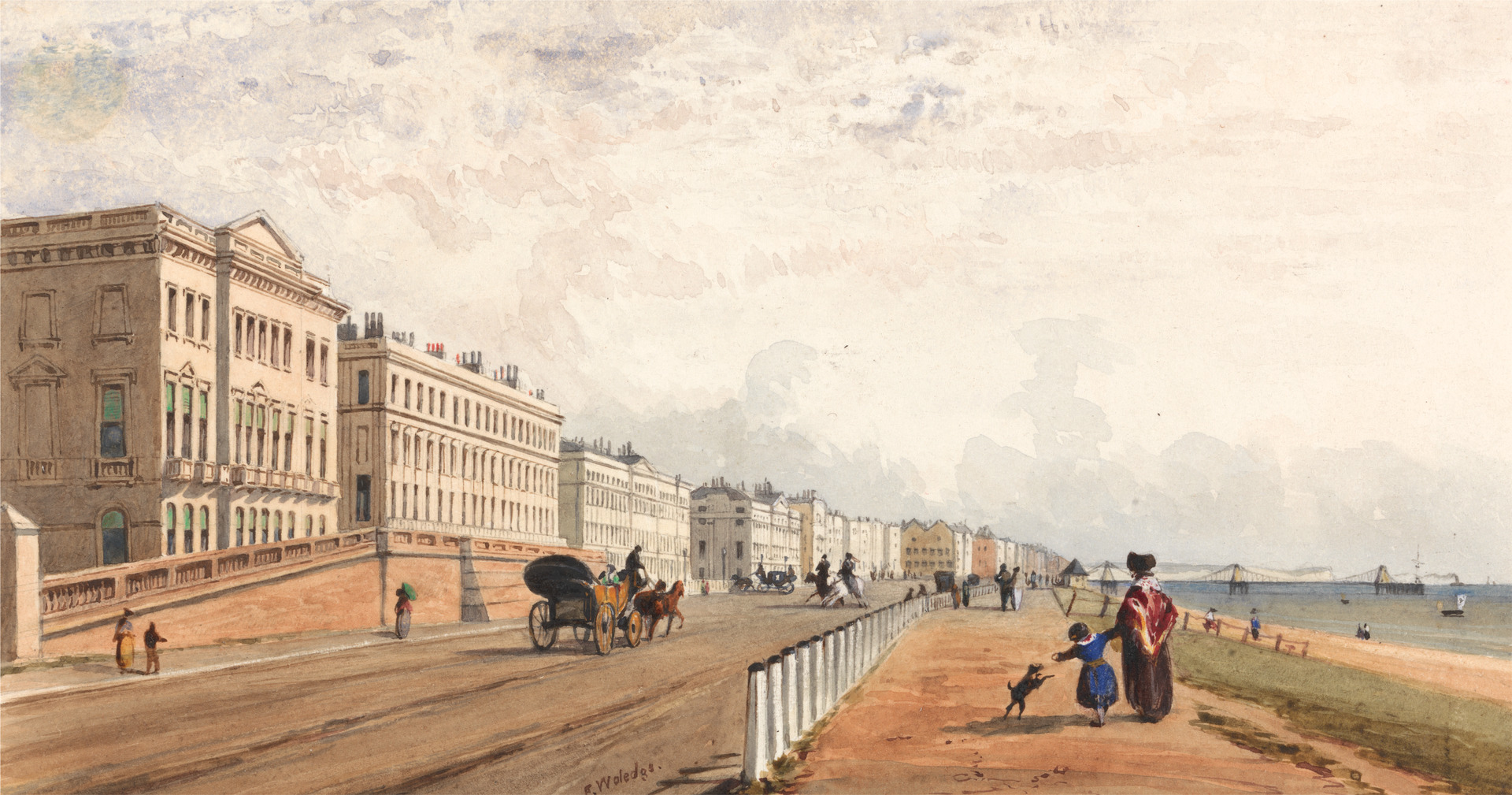
Brighton, The Front and the Chain Pier Seen in the Distance, an early 19th century watercolour painting of Brighton, a seaside resort in East Sussex, England

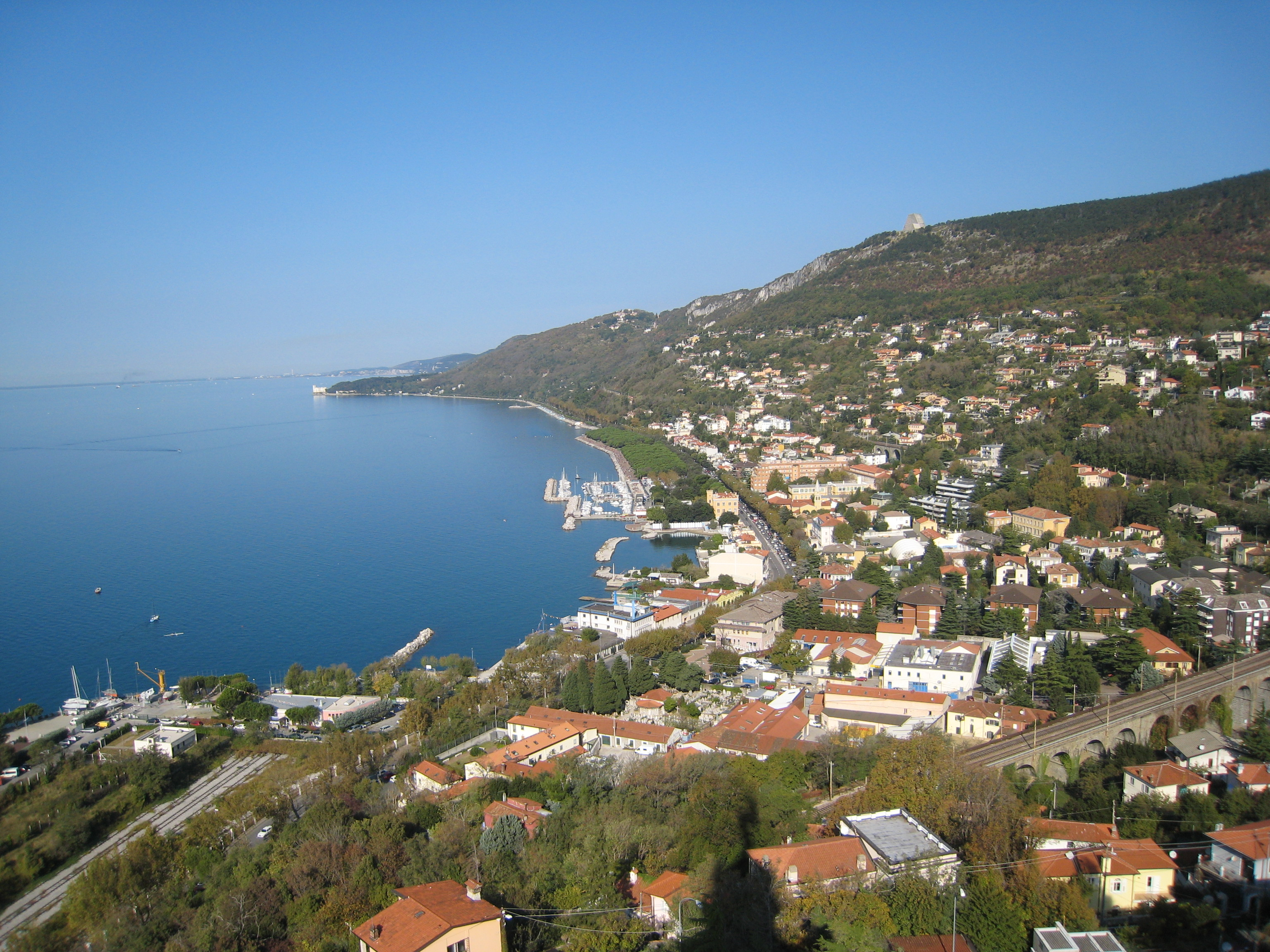
Barcola in Northeast Italy, a holiday seaside resort

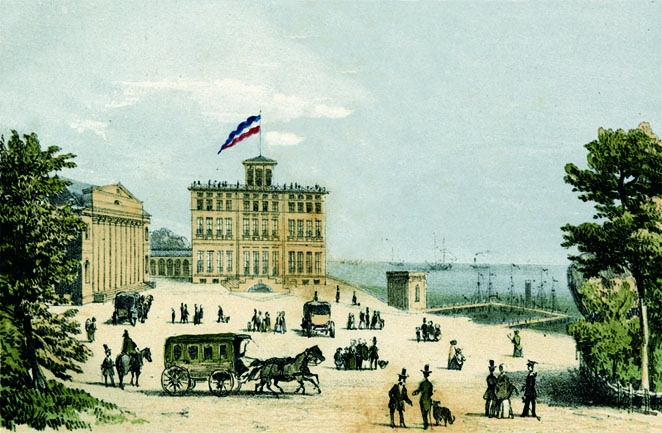
A c. 1841 illustration Heiligendamm in Mecklenburg, Germany, established in 1793, the oldest seaside resort in continental Europe

Seaside resorts have existed since antiquity. In Roman times, the town of Baiae by the Tyrrhenian Sea in Italy was a resort for those who were sufficiently prosperous. Barcola by the Adriatic Sea in northern Italy with its Roman luxury villas is considered a special example of ancient leisure culture by the sea. Mersea Island in Essex, England was a seaside holiday destination for wealthy ancient Romans living in Colchester.

The development of the beach as a popular leisure resort from the mid-19th century was the first manifestation of what is now the global tourist industry. The first seaside resorts were opened in the 18th century for the aristocracy, who began to frequent the seaside as well as the then fashionable spa towns, for recreation and health. One of the earliest such seaside resorts was Scarborough in Yorkshire during the 1720s; it had been a popular spa town since a stream of acidic water was discovered running from one of the cliffs to the south of the town in the 17th century. The first rolling bathing machines were introduced by 1735.

In 1793, Heiligendamm in Mecklenburg, Germany was founded as the first seaside resort of the European continent, which successfully attracted Europe's aristocracy to the Baltic Sea.

The opening of the resort in Brighton and its reception of royal patronage from King George IV extended the seaside as a resort for health and pleasure to the much larger London market, and the beach became a centre for upper-class pleasure and frivolity. This trend was praised and artistically elevated by the new romantic ideal of the picturesque landscape; Jane Austen's unfinished novel Sanditon is an example of that. Later, Queen Victoria's long-standing patronage of the Isle of Wight and Ramsgate in Kent ensured that a seaside residence was considered a highly fashionable possession for those wealthy enough to afford more than one home.

=== Seaside resorts for the middle and working classes ===
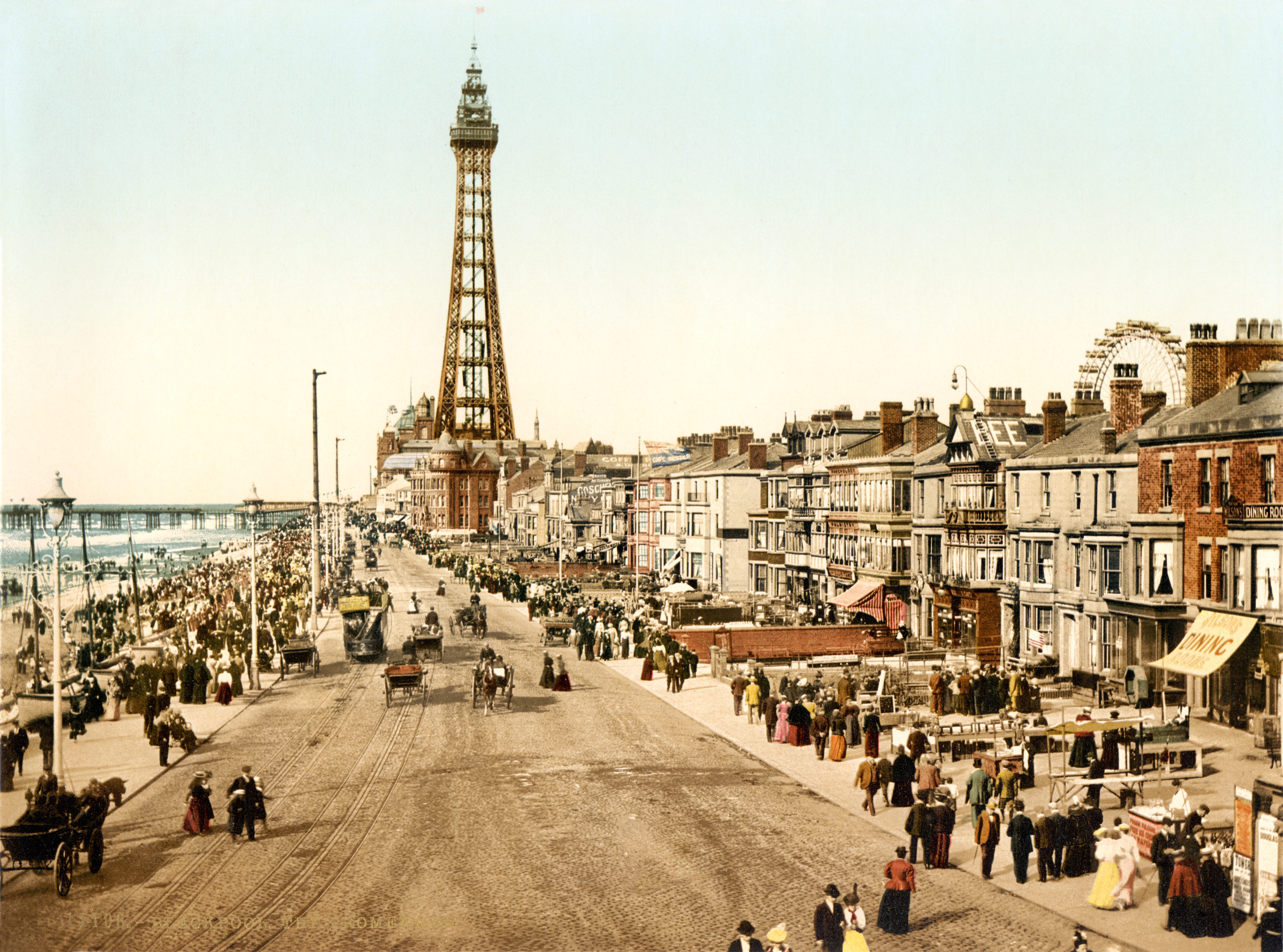
The Blackpool promenade in Lancashire, England, c. 1898

The extension of this form of leisure to the middle and working classes began with the development of the railways in the 1840s; they offered cheap travel to fast-growing resort towns. In particular, the branch line to the small seaside town of Blackpool from Poulton-le-Fylde led to a sustained economic and demographic boom. A sudden influx of visitors arriving by rail motivated entrepreneurs to build accommodation and create new attractions, leading to more visitors and rapid growth throughout the 1850s and 1860s.

The growth was intensified by the practice among the Lancashire cotton mill owners of closing the factories for a week every year to service and repair machinery. These became known as wakes weeks. Each town's mills would close for a different week, allowing Blackpool to manage a steady and reliable stream of visitors over a prolonged period in the summer. A prominent feature of the resort was the promenade and the pleasure piers, where an eclectic variety of performances vied for the people's attention. In 1863, the North Pier in Blackpool was completed, rapidly becoming a centre of attraction for elite visitors. Central Pier was completed in 1868, with a theatre and a large open-air dance floor.

Many popular beach resorts were equipped with bathing machines, because even the all-covering beachwear of the period was considered immodest.

By the end of the century the English coastline had over 100 large resort towns, some with populations exceeding 50,000.

=== Expansion around the world ===
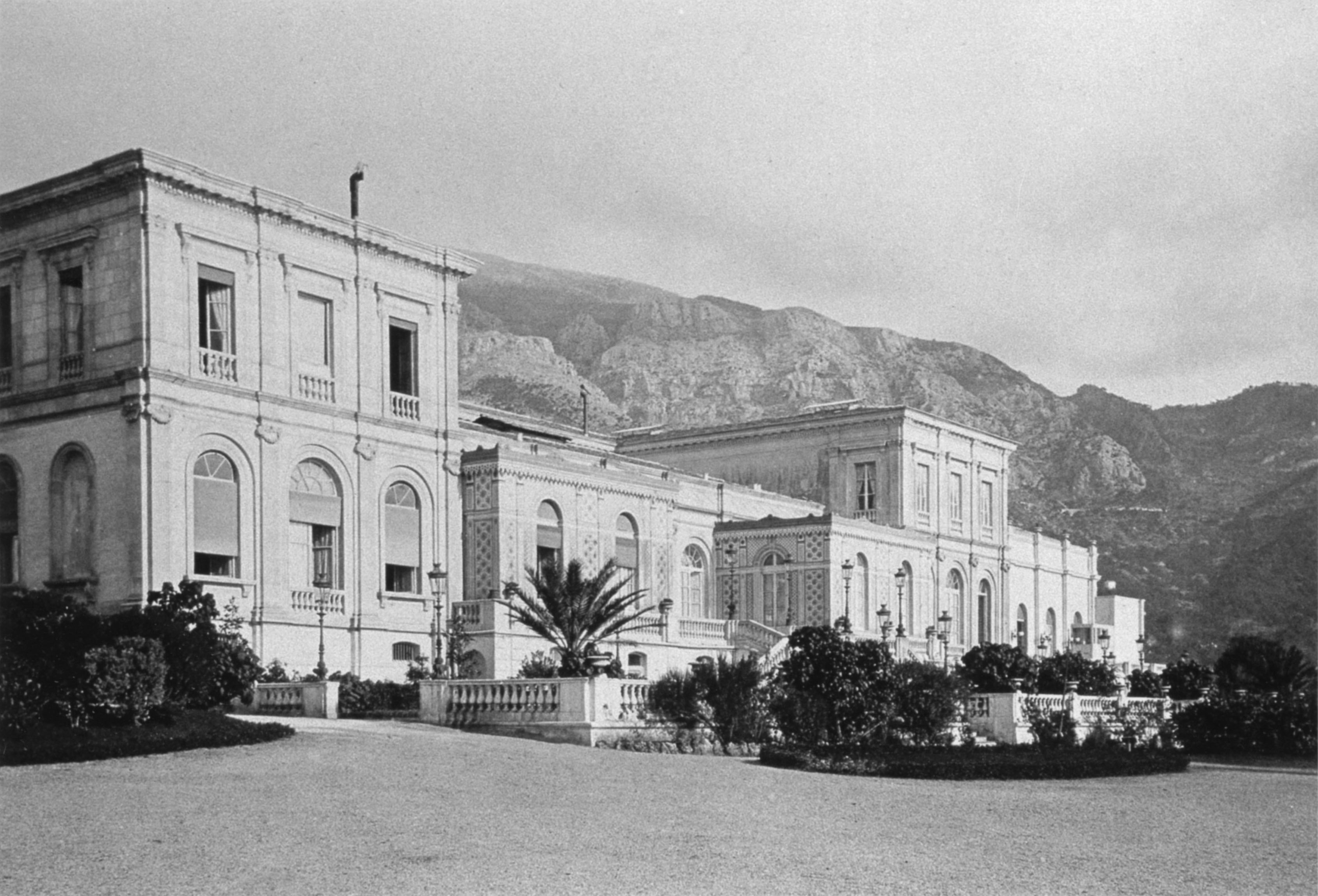
A seaside façade in Monte Carlo in Monaco in the 1870s

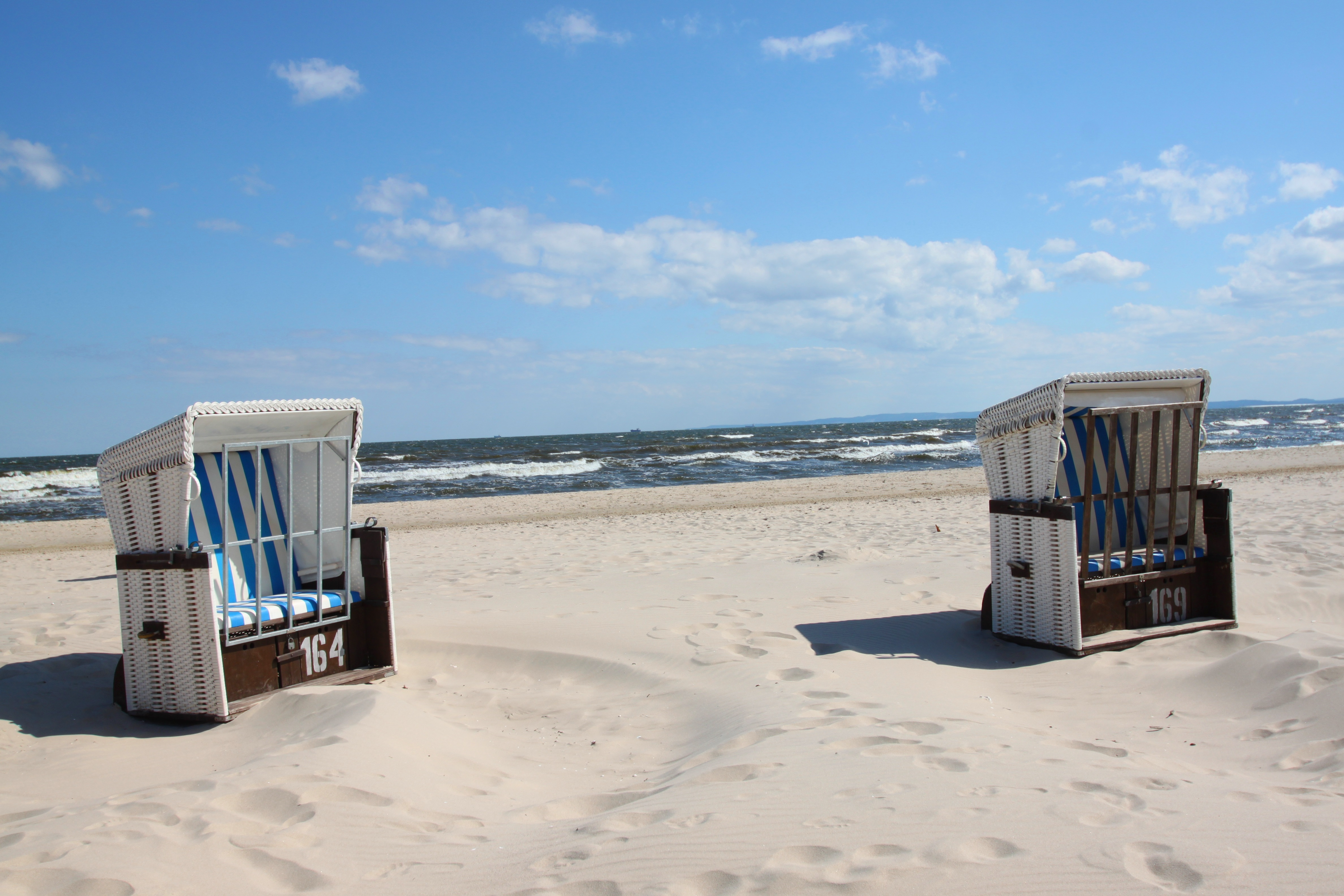
The strandkorb became a symbol of seaside tourism by the end of the 19th century, especially on the southern Baltic Sea coast

The development of the seaside resort abroad was stimulated by the well-developed English love of the beach. The French Riviera on the Mediterranean Sea had already become a destination for the British upper class by the end of the 18th century. In 1864, the first railway to Nice was completed, making the Riviera accessible to visitors from all over Europe. By 1874, foreign residents in Nice, mostly British, numbered 25,000. The coastline became renowned for attracting the royalty of Europe, including Queen Victoria and King Edward VII.

In the United States, early seaside resorts in the late 1800s catered to the wealthy, including city businessmen. Cape May, New Jersey became one of the first coastal resorts in the United States, when regular steamboat traffic on the Delaware River began after the War of 1812. Early visitors to Cape May included Henry Clay in 1847, and Abraham Lincoln in 1849. By 1880, Henry Flagler had extended several rail lines southward down the US Atlantic coastline, enticing northern upper-class families south to subtropical Florida. The Florida East Coast Railway brought northern tourists to St. Augustine in greater numbers, and by 1887 Flagler began to build two large ornate hotels in St. Augustine, the 540-room Ponce de Leon Hotel and the Hotel Alcazar, and bought the Casa Monica Hotel the next year.

Continental European attitudes towards gambling and nudity tended to be more lax than in Britain, and British and French entrepreneurs were quick to exploit the possibilities. In 1863, the Prince of Monaco, Charles III and François Blanc, a French businessman, arranged for steamships and carriages to take visitors from Nice to Monaco, where large luxury hotels, gardens and casinos were built. The place was renamed Monte Carlo. Commercial seabathing also spread to other areas of the United States and parts of the British Empire such as Australia, where surfing became popular in the early 20th century. By the 1970s cheap and affordable air travel was the catalyst for the growth of a global tourism market.

Since the late 20th century, recreational fishing and leisure boat pursuits have become very lucrative, and traditional fishing villages are often well positioned to take advantage of this. Destin, Florida, for instance, has evolved from an artisanal fishing village into a seaside resort dedicated to tourism with a large fishing fleet of recreational charter boats.

== Around the world ==
=== Albania ===
- Durrës
- Sarande
- Vlore

=== Australia ===
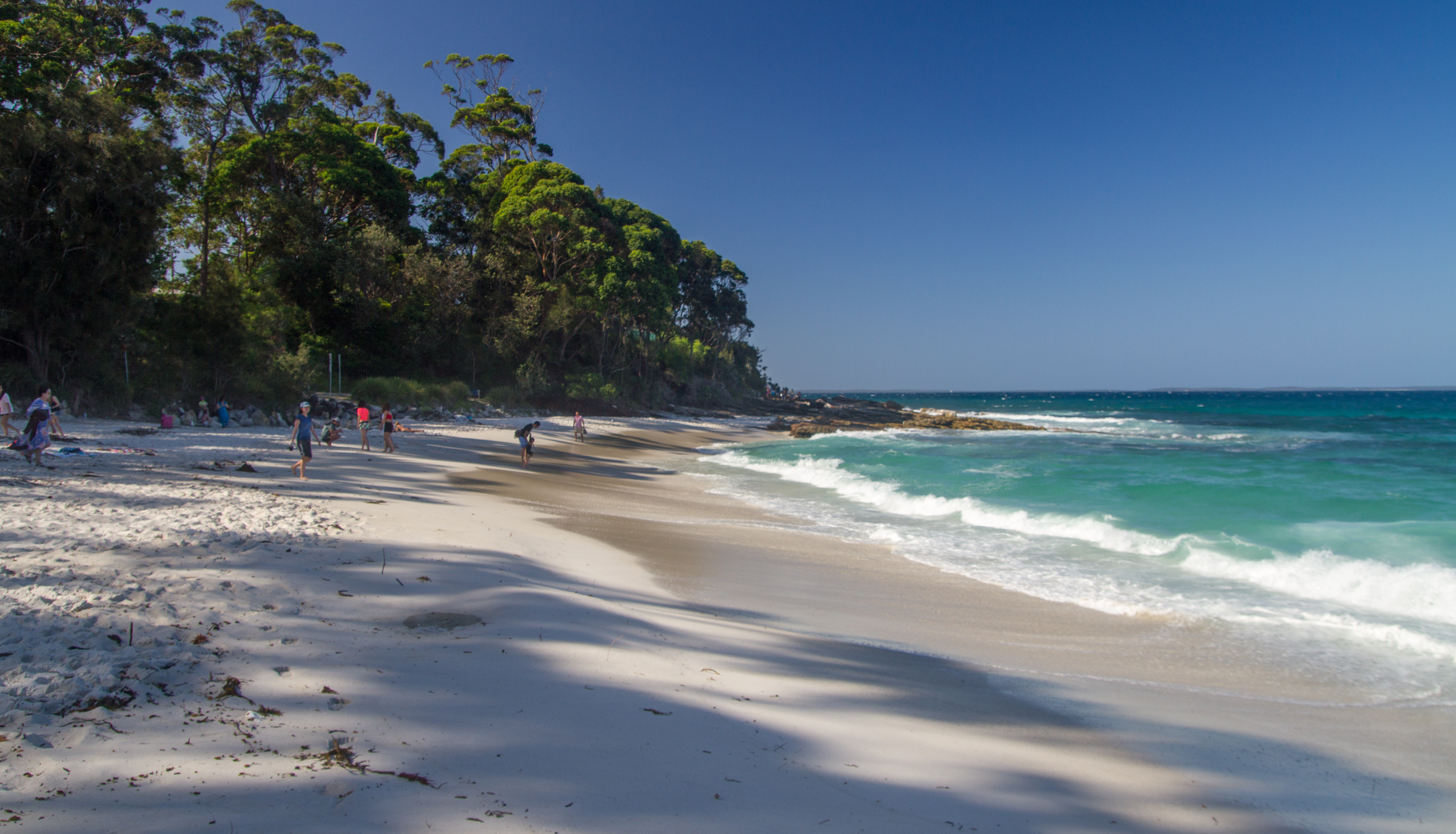
Hyams Beach in the Jervis Bay Territory in Australia, renowned for its brilliantly white sand

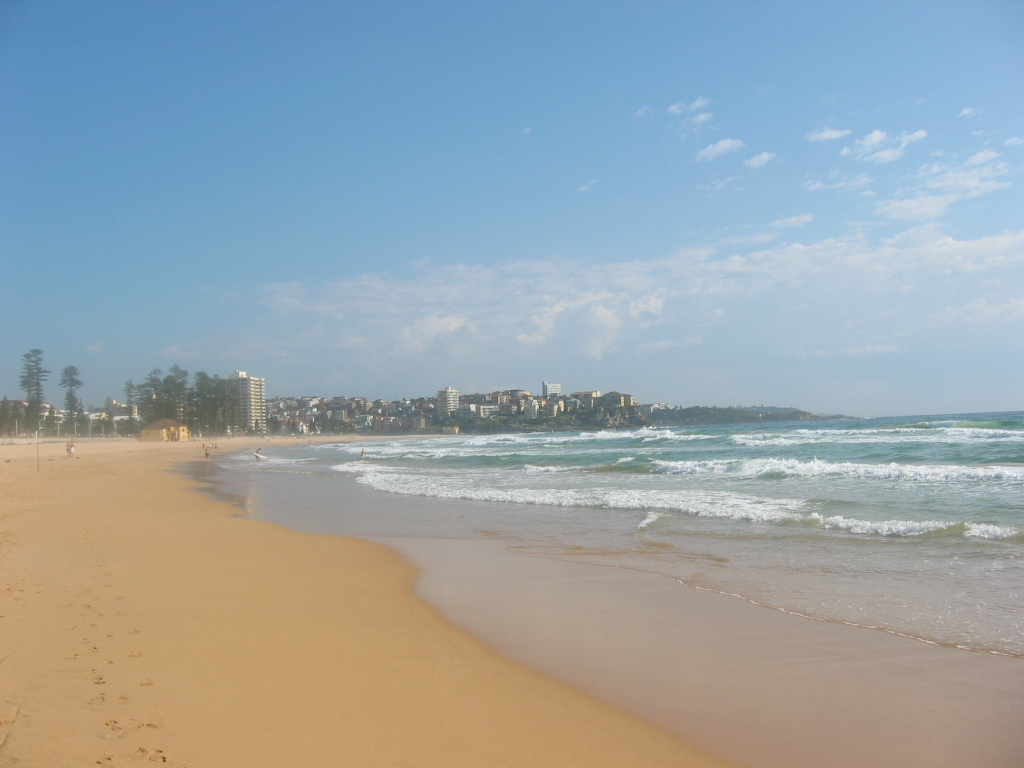
Manly Beach in Sydney, a popular Australian beach

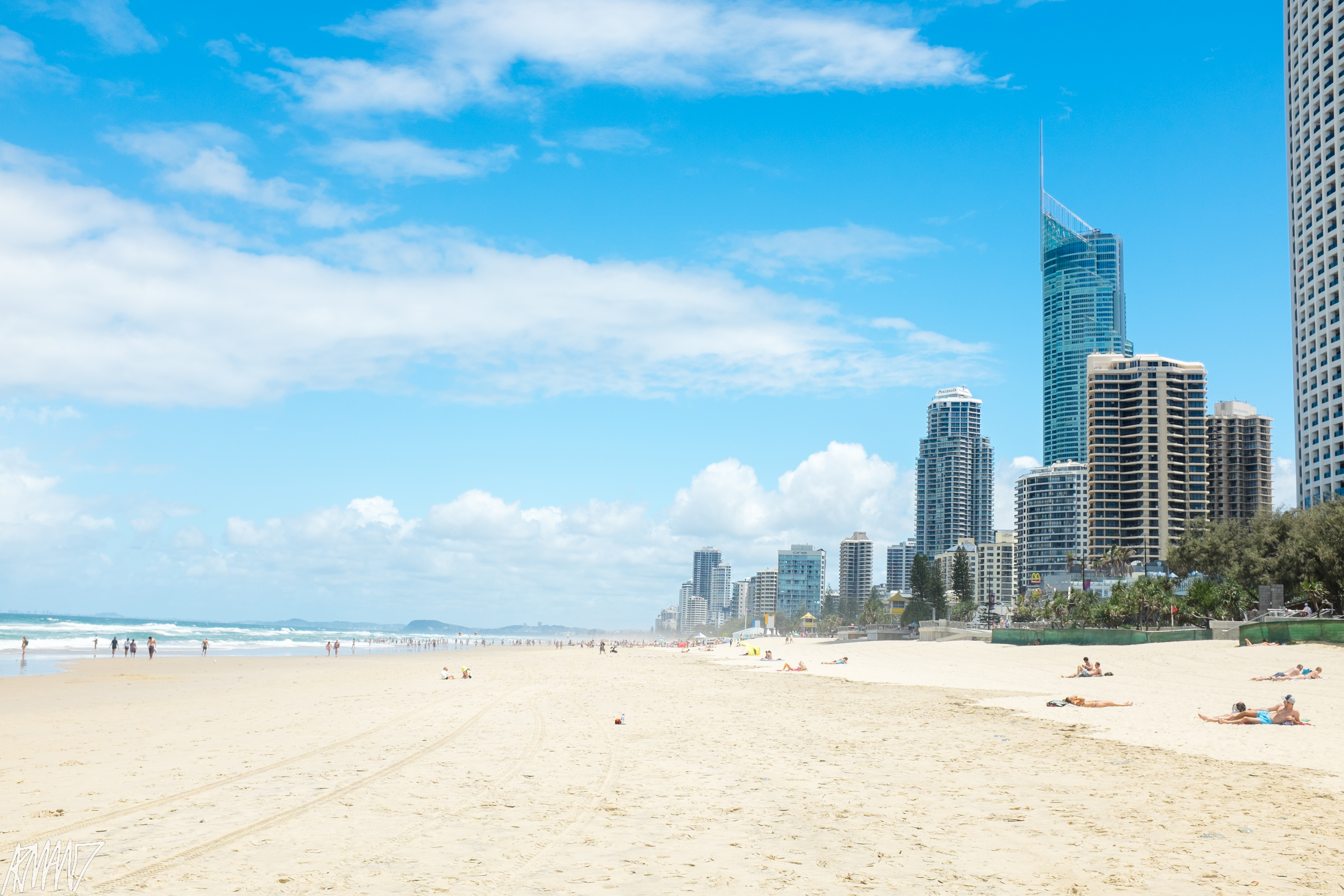
Surfers Paradise, one of the most frequently visited Australian seaside resorts

- Gold Coast (Surfers Paradise)
- Sunshine Coast
- Jervis Bay (Hyams Beach)
- Tangalooma
- Queenscliff, Victoria
- Agnes Water
- St Kilda Beach
- Glenelg
- Byron Bay
- Central Coast (The Entrance, Newcastle and Ettalong Beach)
- Batemans Bay
- Port Douglas
- Port Macquarie
- Ballina, New South Wales
- Fitzroy Island
- Sydney (Bondi Beach, Manly Beach, Brighton-Le-Sands, Palm Beach)
- Wollongong
- Noosa Heads
- Coffs Harbour
- Margaret River
- Palm Cove
- Nelson
- Nelson Bay
- South West Rocks
- Yamba
- Lizard Island National Park
- Cairns
- Airlie Beach
- Kiama
- Forster
- Culburra Beach
- Tweed Heads
- Redcliffe, Queensland

=== Belgium ===
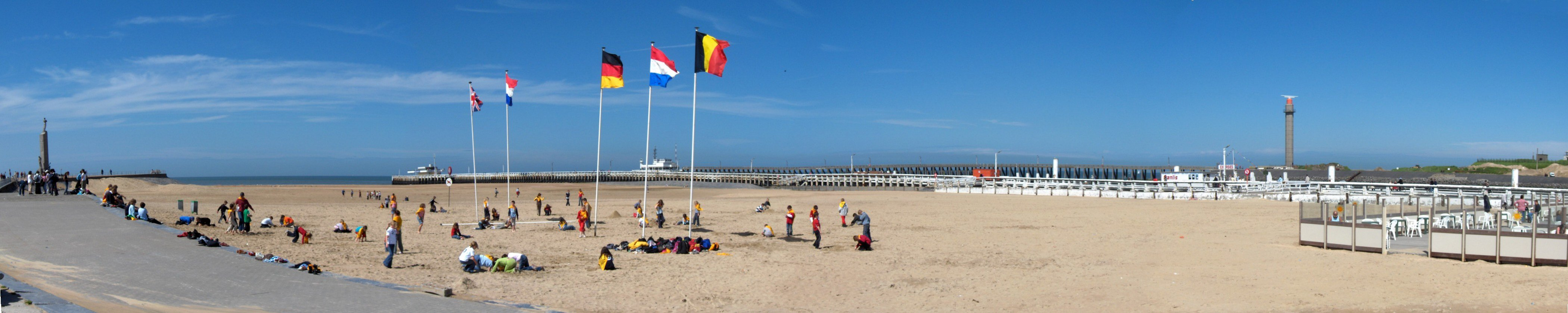
The beach and promenade pier in Ostend in Belgium

Seaside resorts on the Flemish coast of West-Vlaanderen exist at the famous Knokke, Ostend and also De Panne and coastal towns along the North Sea served by the coastal tramway Kusttram run by De Lijn.

=== Bulgaria ===
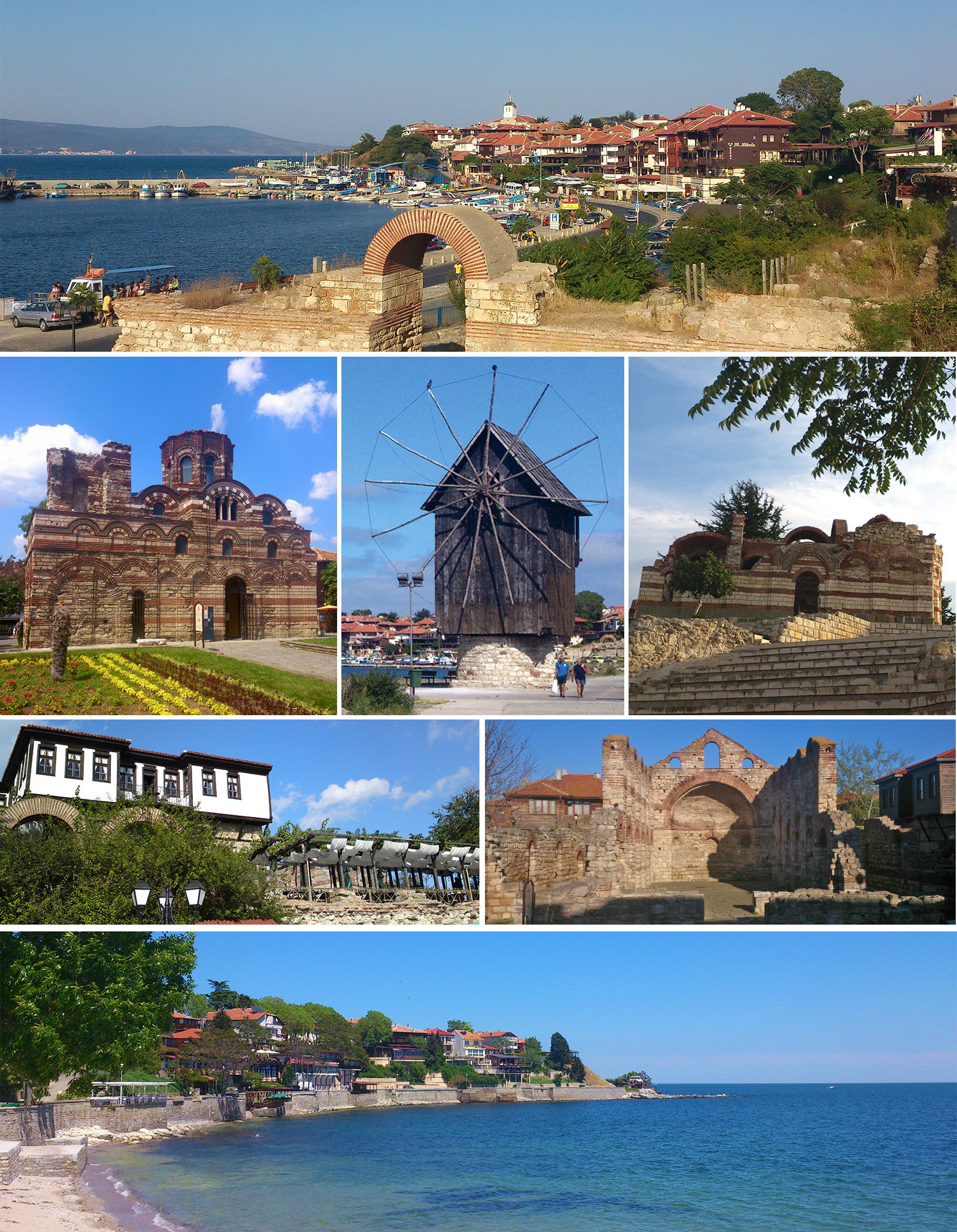
Nesebar in Bulgaria

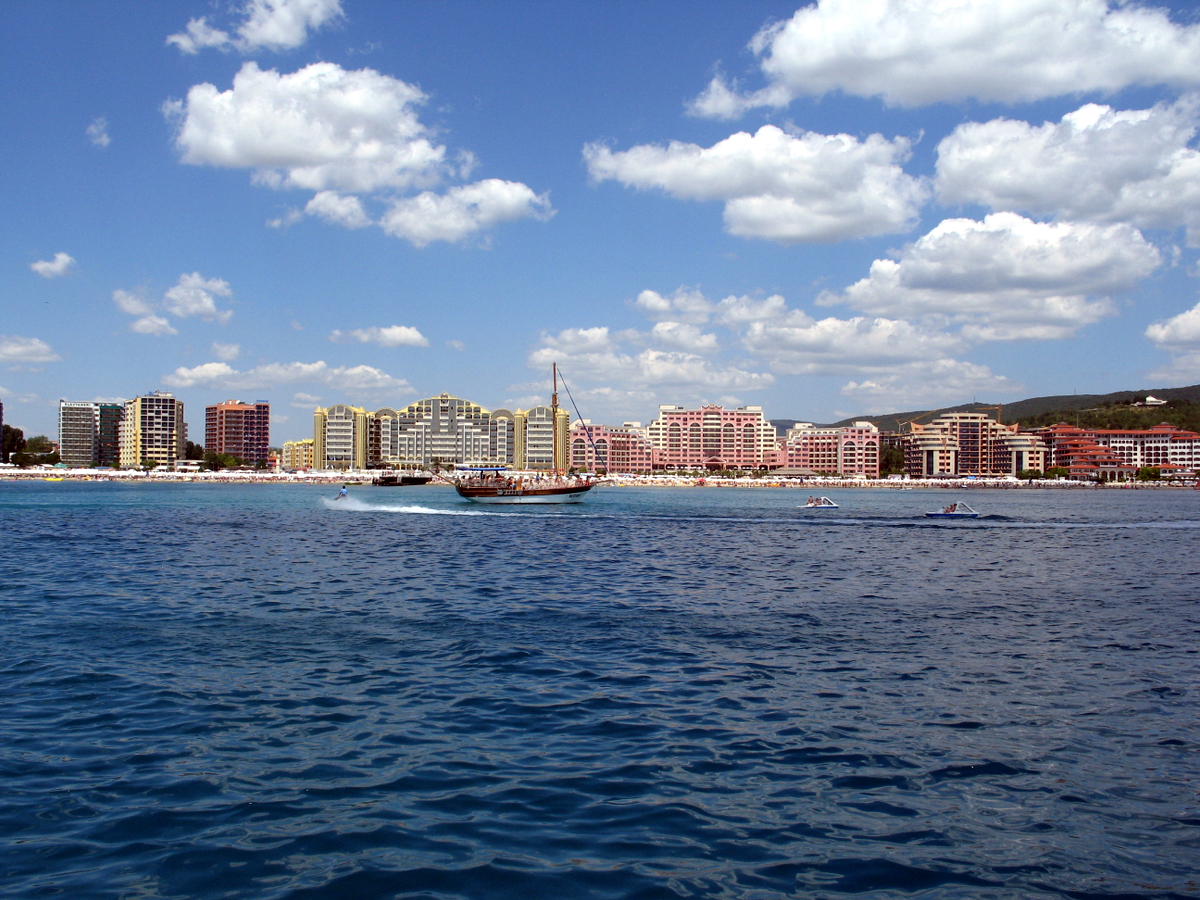
Sunny Beach in Bulgaria

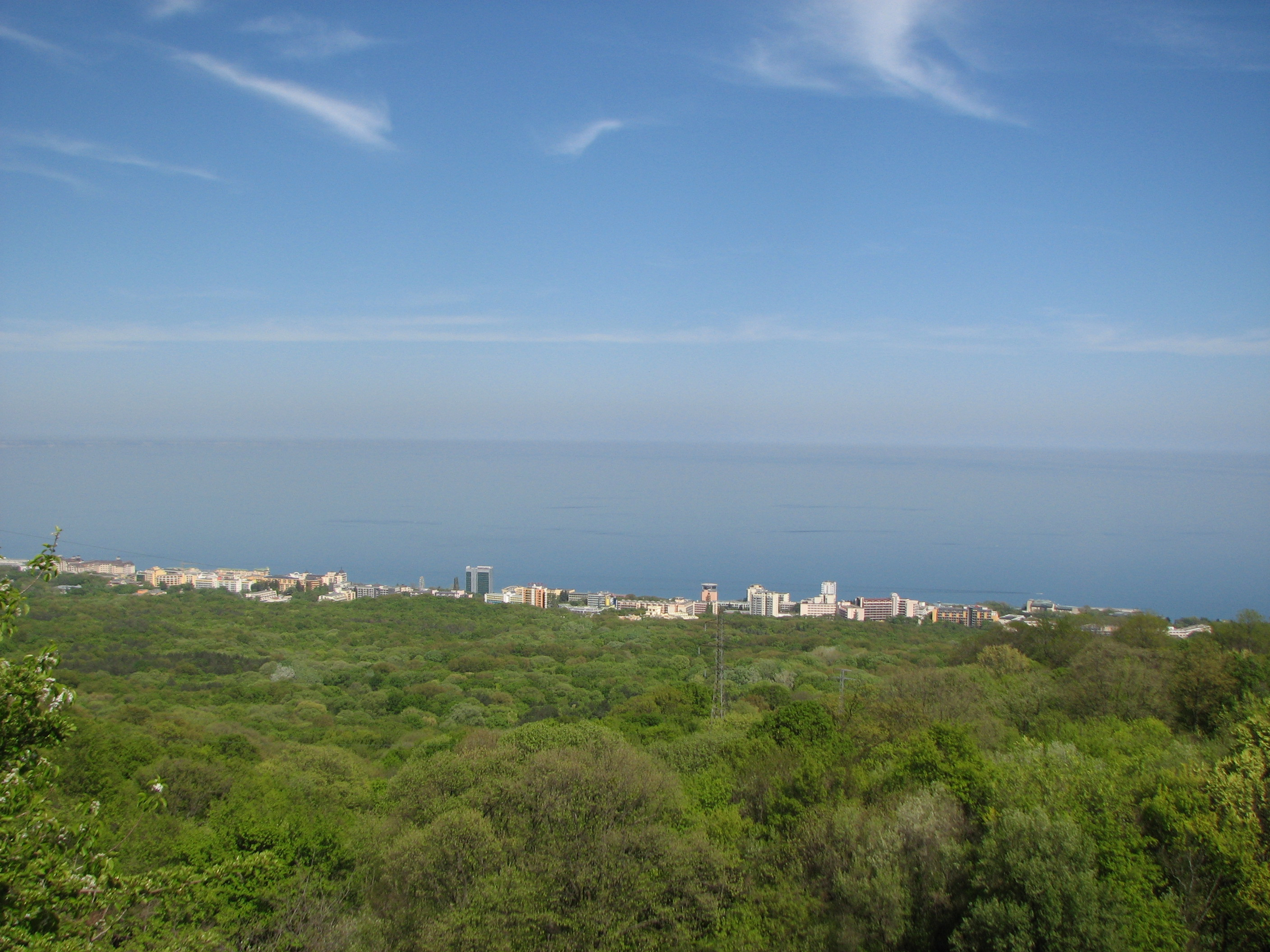
The coast around Golden Sands with the neighbouring nature park

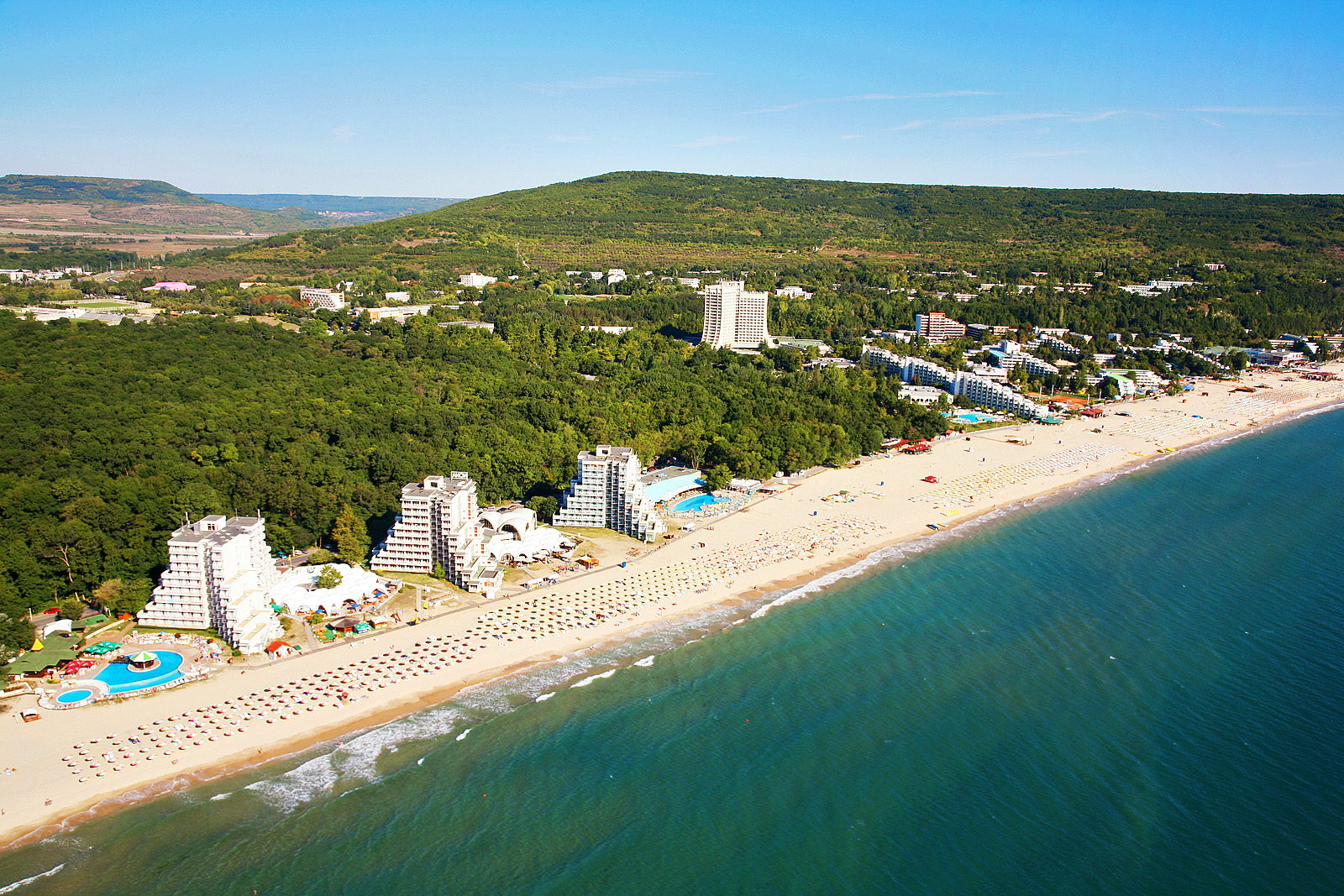
Albena in Bulgaria

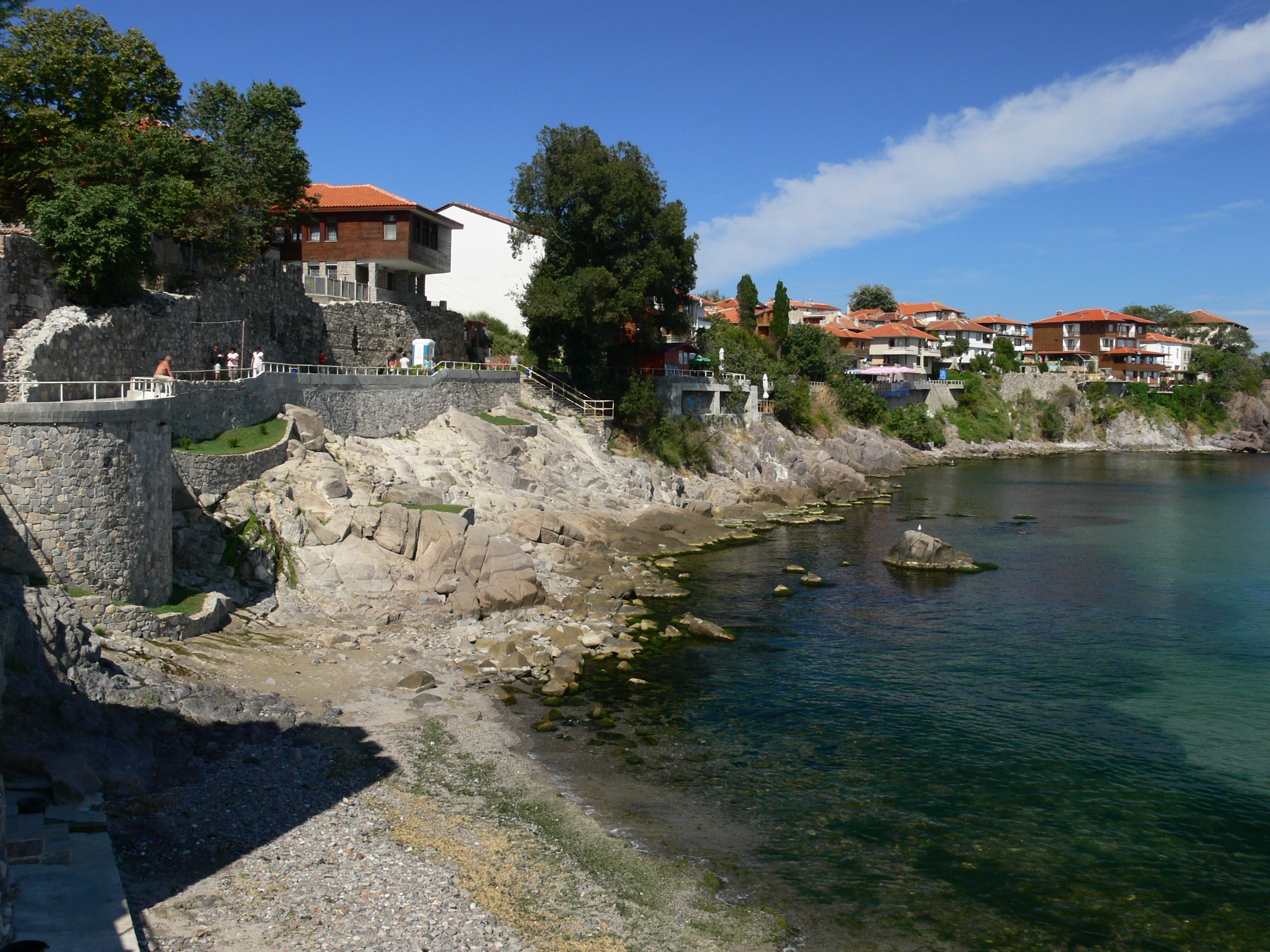
Sozopol

- Sunny Beach
- Sozopol
- Golden Sands
- Constantine and Helena
- Sveti Vlas
- Albena
- Obzor
- Kranevo
- Ravda
- Pomorie
- Dyuni
- Balchik
- Kavarna
- Ahtopol
- Kavarna
- Tsarevo
- Rusalka
- Holiday Club Riviera
- Nesebar
- Kamchia (resort)
- Byala
- Primorsko
- Kiten
- Lozenets
- Tsarevo
- Sinemorets
- Varna

=== Brazil ===
- Angra dos Reis
- Arraial do Cabo
- Balneário Camboriú
- Búzios
- Fernando de Noronha
- Florianópolis
- Fortaleza
- Guarujá
- Jericoacoara
- Recife
- Natal
- Porto de Galinhas
- Porto Seguro
- Pipa Beach
- Rio de Janeiro
- Salvador Bahia
- São Miguel dos Milagres
- Trancoso

=== Croatia ===
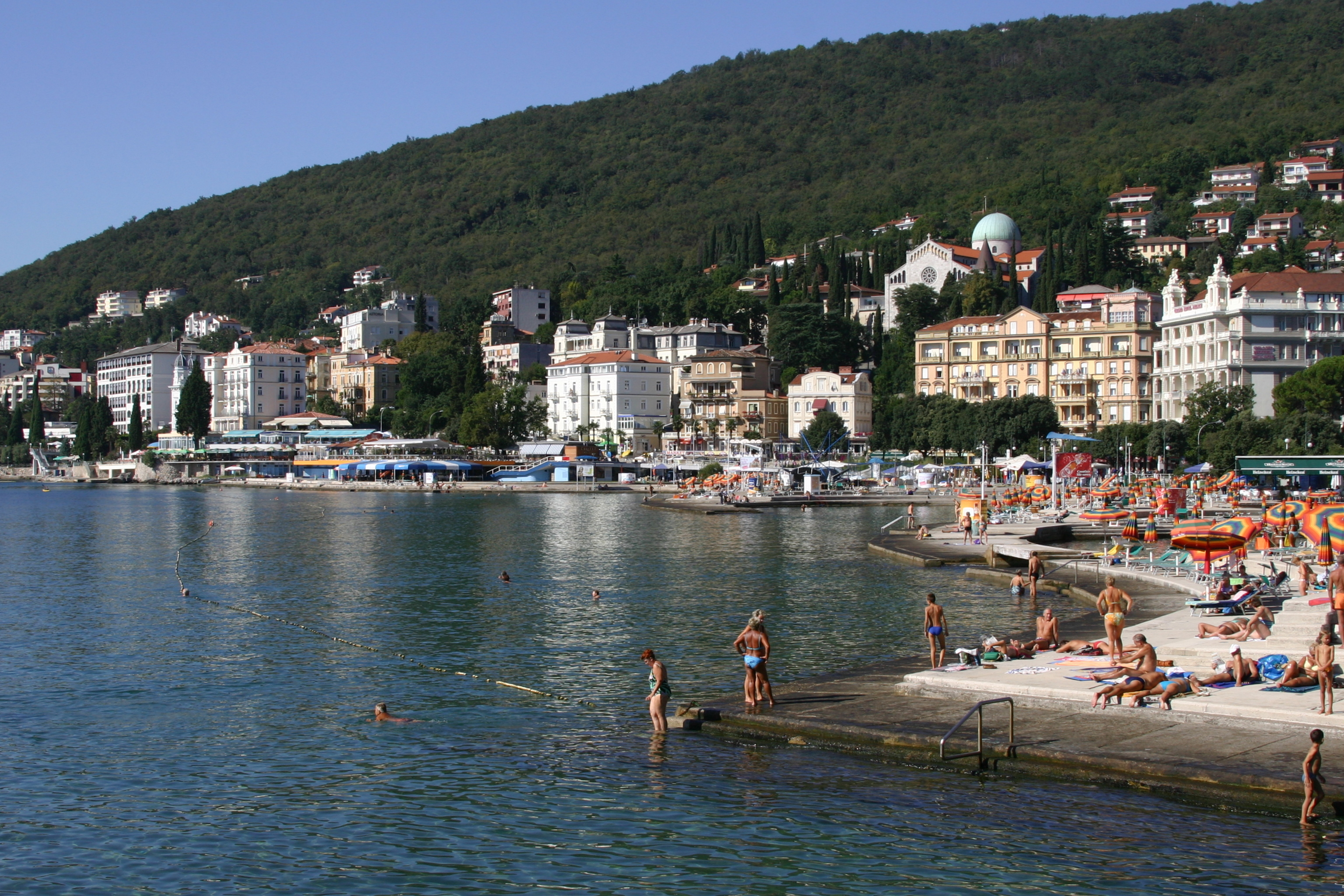
Opatija in Croatia

There are many seaside resorts on the jagged coastline of Croatia and its several islands, including:

- Biograd na Moru
- Cres
- Dubrovnik
- Jablanac
- Krk
- Lopar
- Omiš
- Omišalj
- Opatija
- Poreč
- Pula
- Rijeka
- Šibenik
- Split
- Trogir
- Zadar

=== Cyprus ===
- Ayia Napa
- Coral Bay
- Larnaca
- Latchi
- Limassol
- Paphos
- Pissouri
- Polis
- Protaras

=== Denmark ===
- Blåvand
- Hornbæk
- Marielyst
- Skagen
- Tisvildeleje

=== Estonia ===
- Haapsalu
- Kuressaare
- Narva-Jõesuu
- Pärnu

=== Finland ===
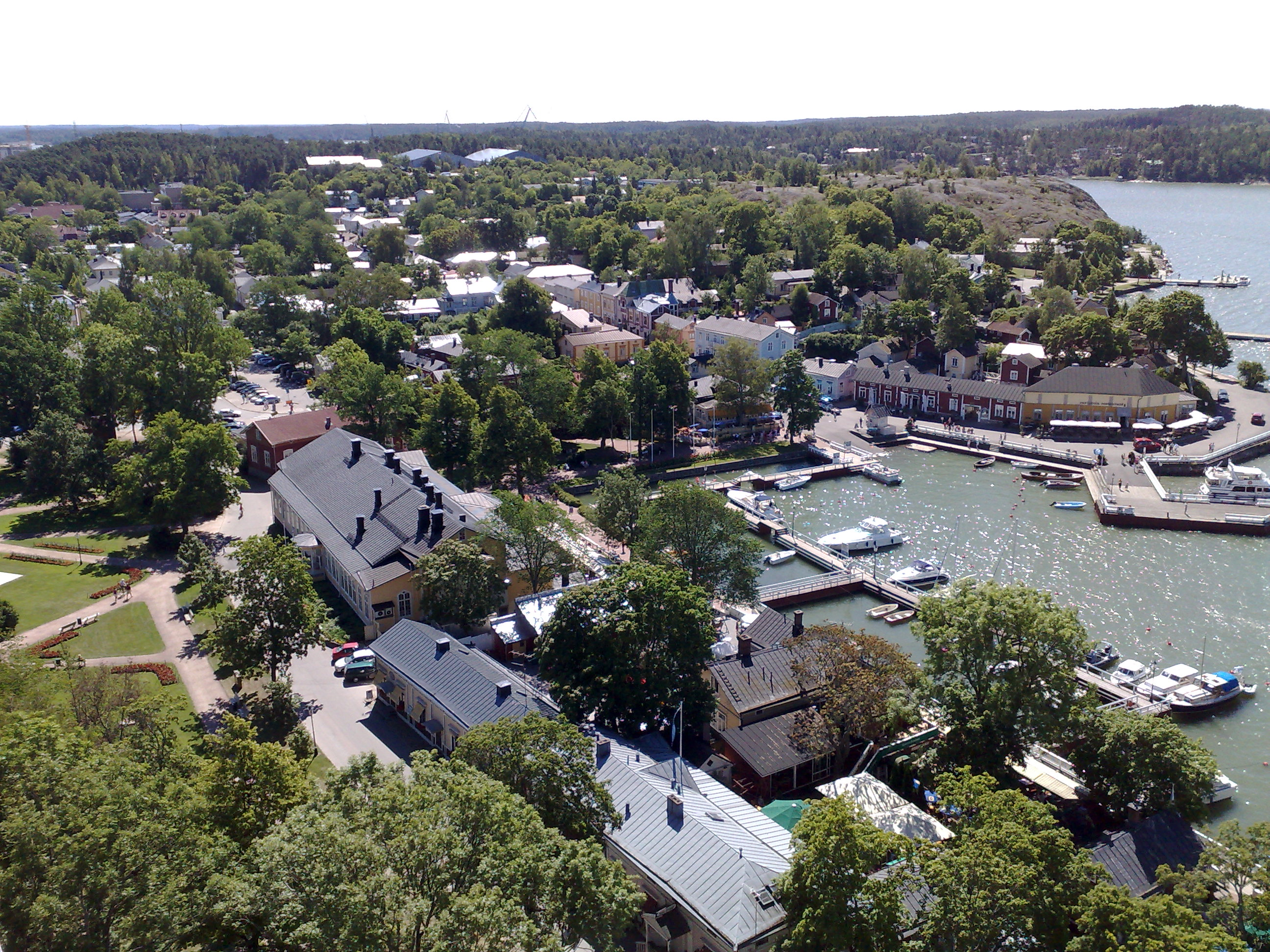
Naantali, a seaside resort in Finland

- Hailuoto
- Hanko
- Kalajoki
- Mariehamn
- Naantali
- Oulu
- Yyteri

=== France ===
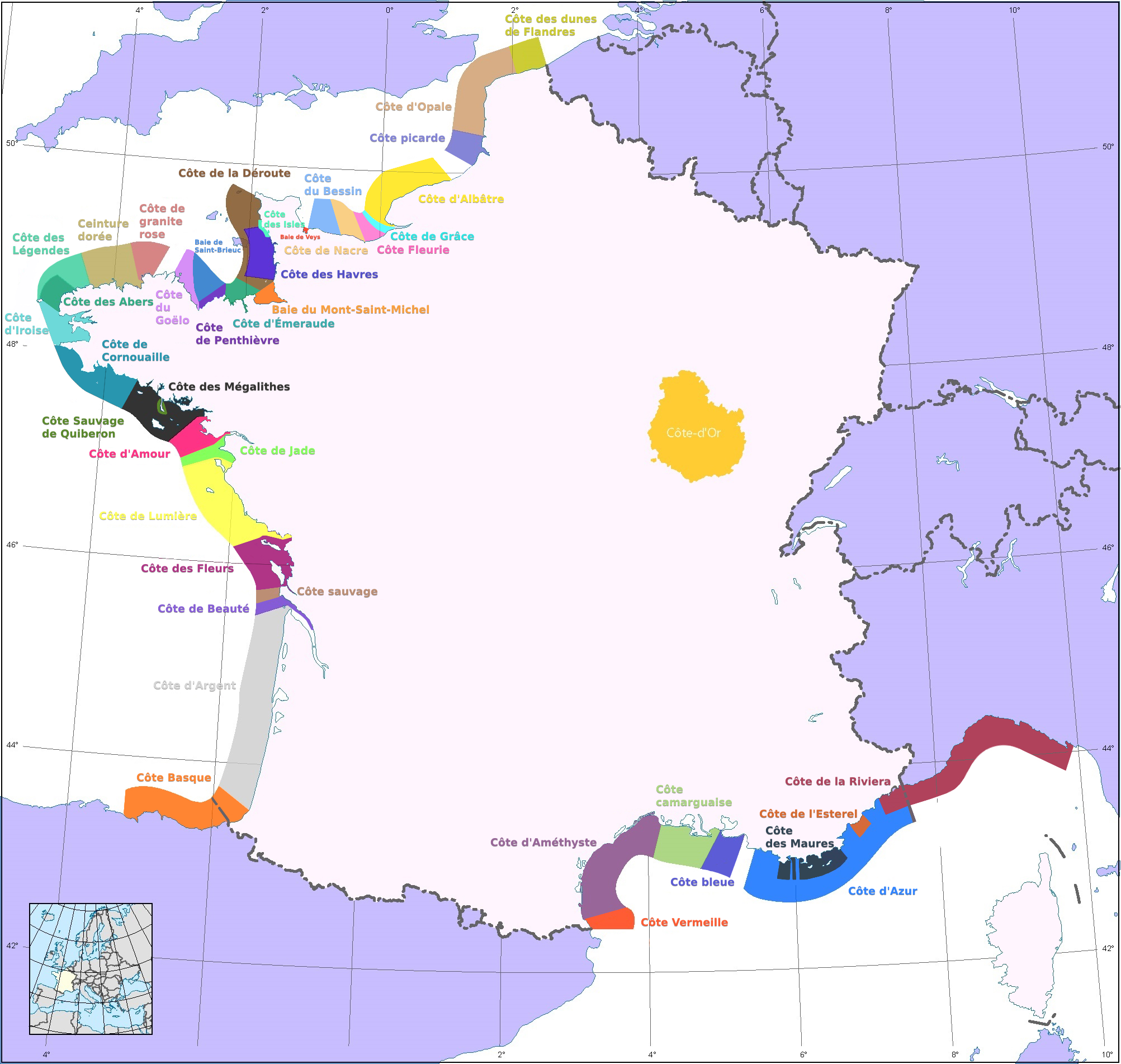
A map of the French coastline showing various resort areas

With three long coastlines, France has many seaside resorts on its various coasts; for specific towns in each region, see the following articles:

- Côte Bleue on the Mediterranean Sea
- Côte d'Argent on the Bay of Biscay
- Côte de Lumière on the Bay of Biscay
- Côte des Landes, a section of the Côte d'Argent
- Côte d'Opale on the English Channel
- Côte Fleurie on the English Channel
- French Riviera (Côte d'Azur) on the Mediterranean Sea

=== Georgia ===
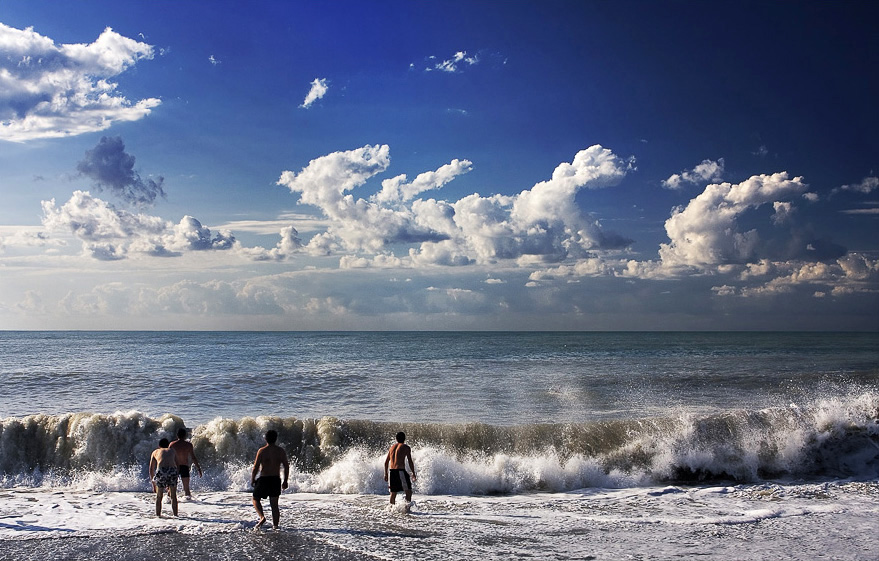
A beach in Batumi in Georgia

- Batumi
- Gagra
- Kobuleti
- Kvariati
- New Athos
- Pitsunda
- Sukhumi

=== Germany ===
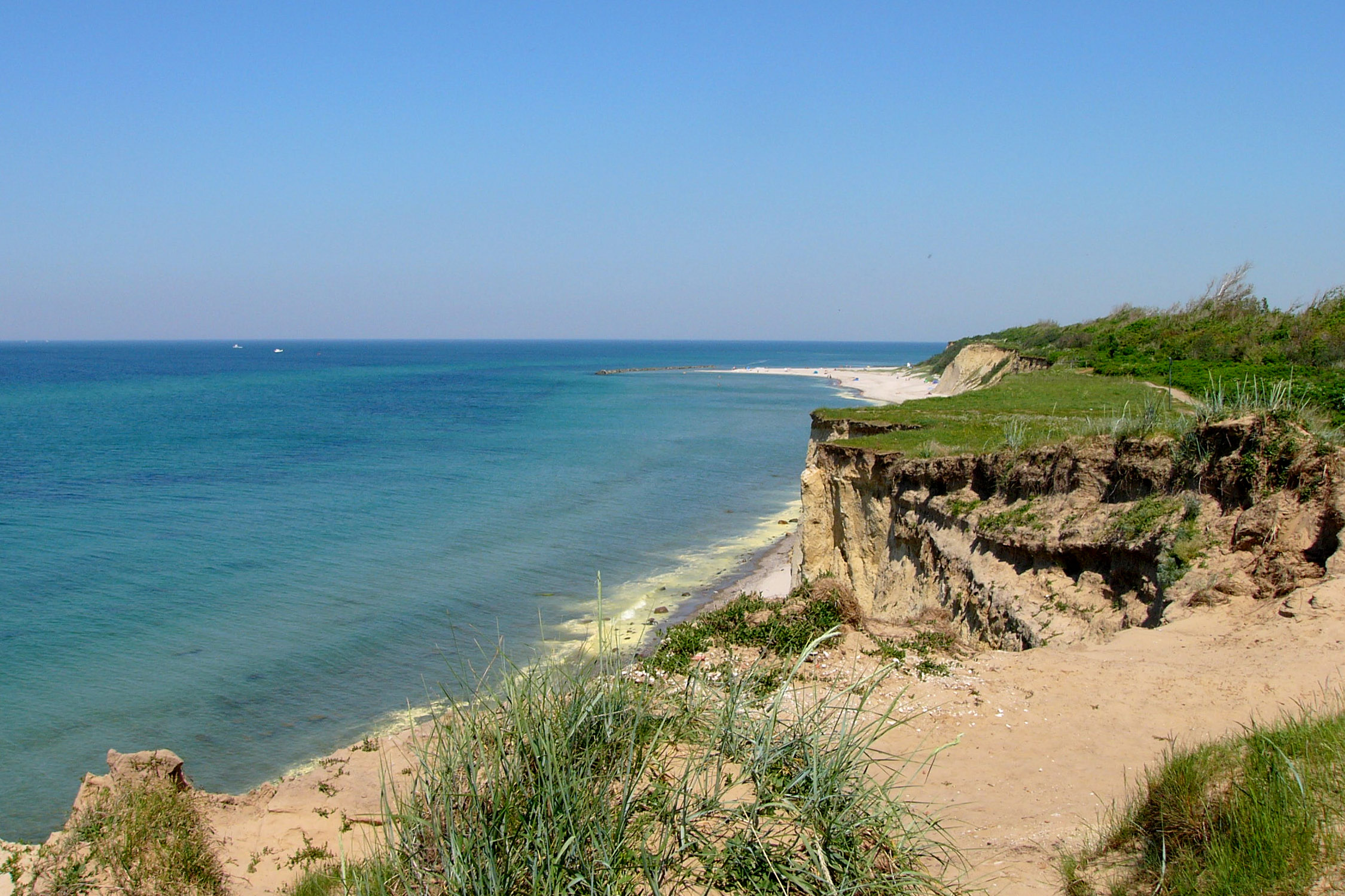
Steep coast at Darss West Beach, near Ahrenshoop in Germany

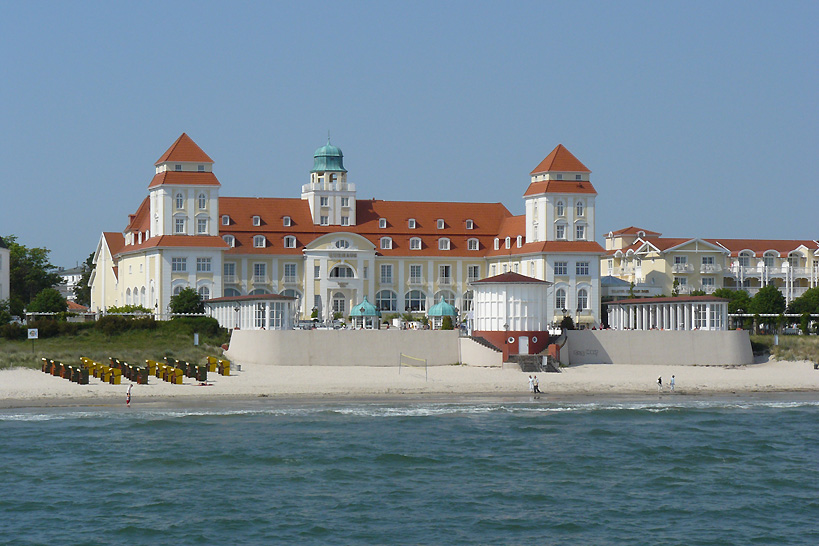
Kurhaus of Binz on Rügen island, one of the most famous German seaside spas, which showcases the typical resort architecture of Germany's Pomeranian coast

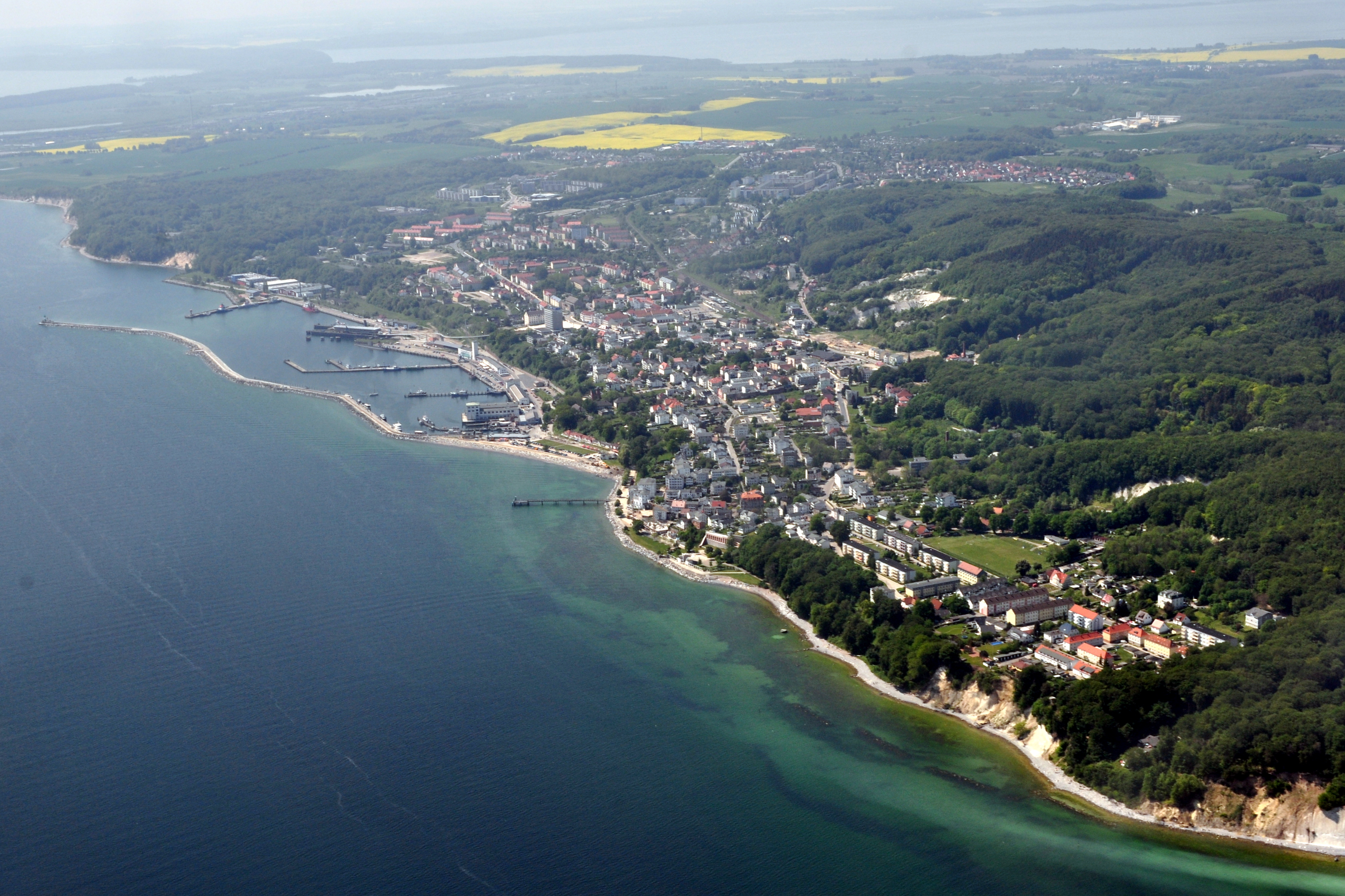
An aerial view of Sassnitz seaside resort and the nearby Jasmund National Park chalk cliffs, Rugia island in Germany

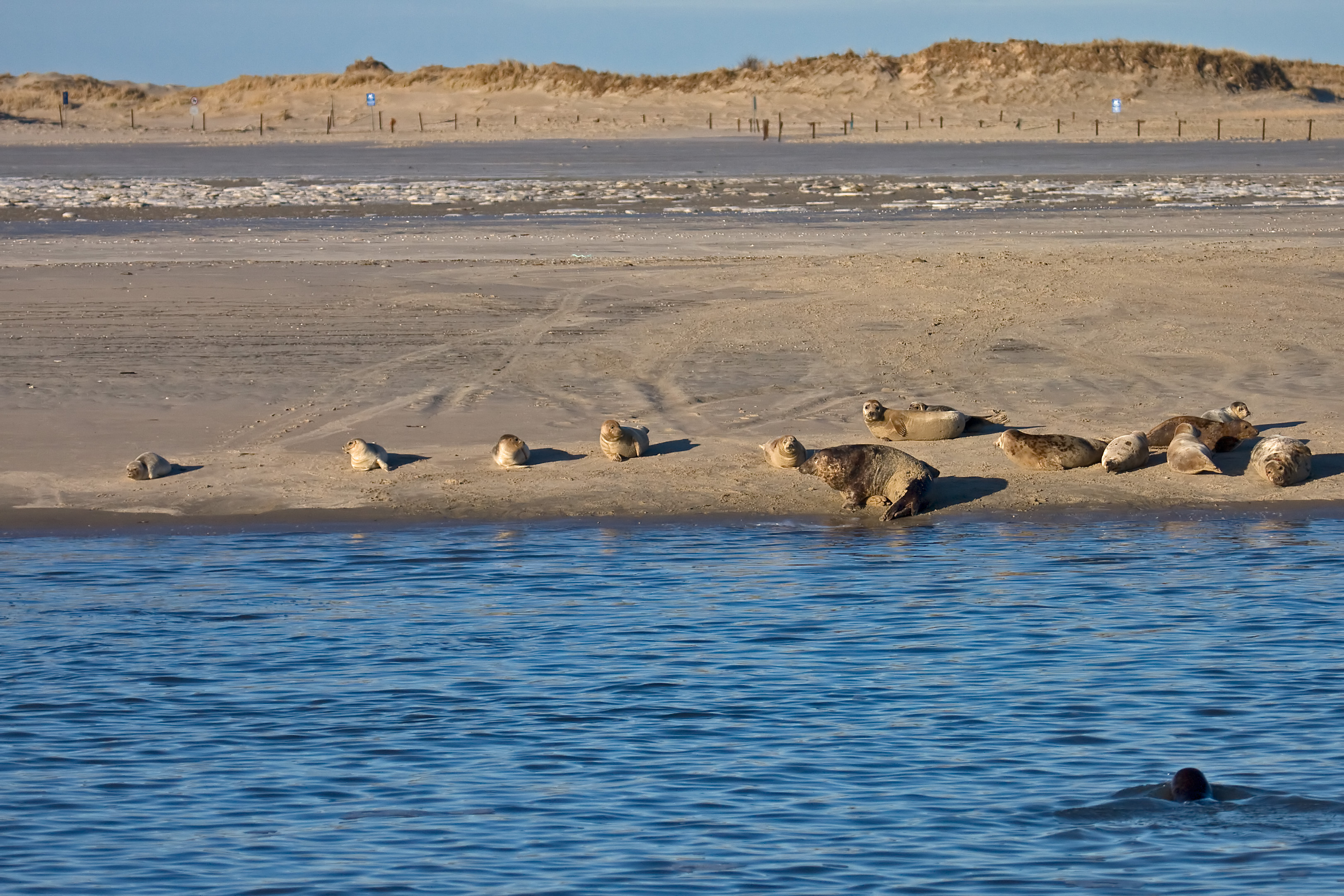
Seals sunbathing at a beach in Norderney, a North Sea resort in Germany

Germany is known for its traditional seaside resorts on the Baltic Sea and the North Sea coasts, mainly established in the 19th century. In German they are called Seebad ("Sea Spa") or Seeheilbad, sometimes with Ostsee- or Nordsee- as prefixes for the respective coastline.

The most prestigious resorts can be found along the Baltic coastline, including the islands of Rugia and Usedom. They often feature a unique architectural style called resort architecture. The coast of Mecklenburg and Western Pomerania alone has an overall length of 2000 km and is nicknamed German Riviera. Heiligendamm in Mecklenburg, established in 1793, is the oldest seaside resort in Germany and continental Europe.

Most important coastal areas with seaside resorts in Germany:

- Baltic Sea: islands of Fehmarn, Hiddensee, Rügen, Usedom; Mecklenburg coast, Rostock, peninsula of Fischland, Darss and Zingst
- North Sea: East Frisian Islands and North Frisian Islands

Selection of German seaside resorts along the Baltic Sea coastline:

- Ahrenshoop
- Laboe
- Mecklenburg:
  - Boltenhagen
  - Graal-Müritz
  - Heiligendamm
  - Kühlungsborn
  - Warnemünde
- Rugia Island:
  - Baabe
  - Binz
  - Göhren
  - Sassnitz
  - Sellin
- Timmendorfer Strand
- Travemünde
- Usedom Island:
  - Amber Spas
  - Kaiserbad Heringsdorf with Ahlbeck and Bansin
  - Zinnowitz
- Zingst

At the North Sea coastline:

- Cuxhaven
- Norderney
- St. Peter-Ording
- Spiekeroog
- Wangerooge
- Wyk auf Föhr
- Sylt Island:
  - Kampen
  - Wenningstedt
  - Westerland

=== Greece ===
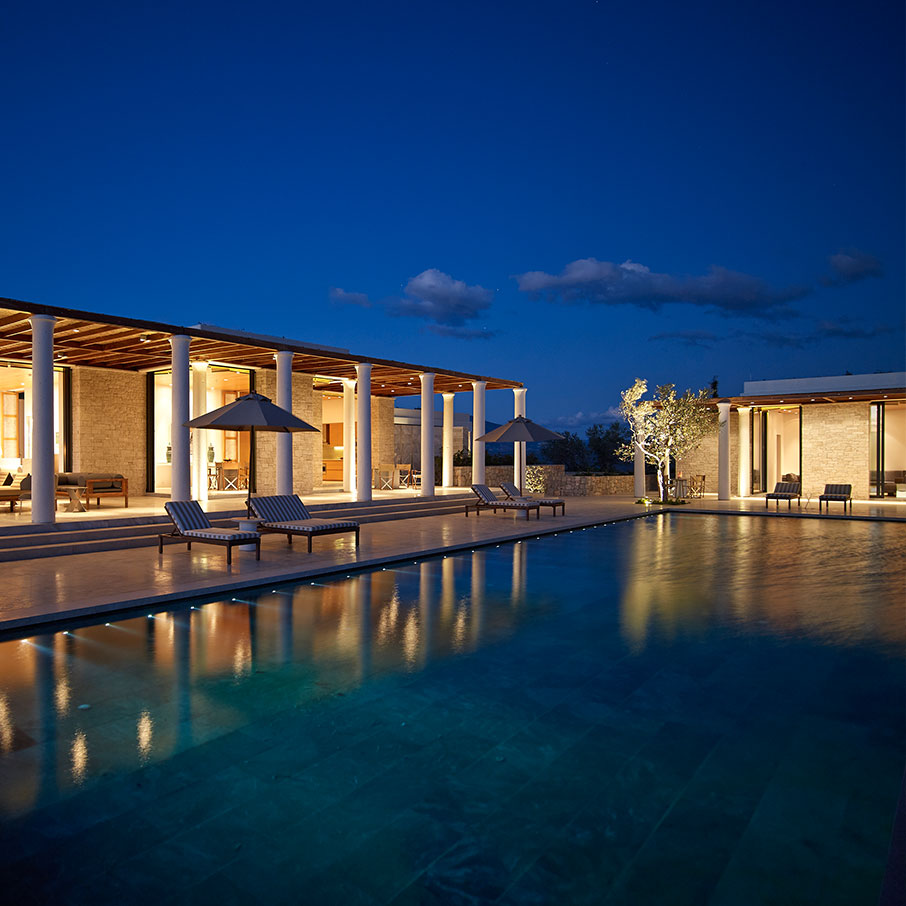
A hotel in Kranidi in Greece

Greece, renowned as a summer destination, features a large amount of seaside resorts. Some of them include:

- Agia Pelagia
- Agia Triada
- Agioi Theodoroi
- Asprovalta
- Chalkidiki, a peninsula with a variety of coastal villages that are considered resorts such as: Afytos, Chaniotis, Nea Poteidaia, Neos Marmaras, Nikiti, Sarti and others.
- Corfu
- Crete island
- Ermioni
- Eretria
- Glyfada, Phocis
- Kamena Vourla
- Karystos
- Katakolo
- Kavos
- Kineta
- Kranidi
- Kyllini, Elis
- Kymi
- Laganas
- Leptokarya
- Loutraki
- Malia
- Matala
- Mykonos
- Naousa (Paros)
- Nafpaktos
- Nea Kallikrateia
- Neoi Poroi
- Olympiaki Akti
- Parga
- Peraia
- Platamon
- Porto Cheli
- Porto Rafti
- Preveza
- Pythagoreio
- Rhodes
- Santorini
- Stavros
- Syvota
- Thessaloniki

=== India ===
India has a long coastline and hence has numerous beaches and resort towns. Beaches were already a popular tourist destination for the kings and the masses alike especially in South India where the Dravidian Empires built large temples near the seashore. Beaches are also associated with Hindu rituals where pilgrims from different parts of India go for worshipping rituals. The sunrise and sunset are also associated with Hindu traditions which are considered sacred my many Hindu communities and there are festivals to celebrate the sunset and sunrise. A major example of such festivals is Chhath Puja. The British Raj also contributed in the development of Beach Resorts where Europeans used to visit during the harsh and cold winter of Europe.

The archipelago of Andaman and Nicobar Islands and Lakshadweep are also famous for beach resorts. Other beach resorts in India includes:

- Digha
- Bakkhali
- Sagar Island
- Kovalam
- Kollam
- Calangute
- Canacona
- Juhu
- Puri
- Visakhapatnam
- Karaikal
- Chirala

=== Iceland ===
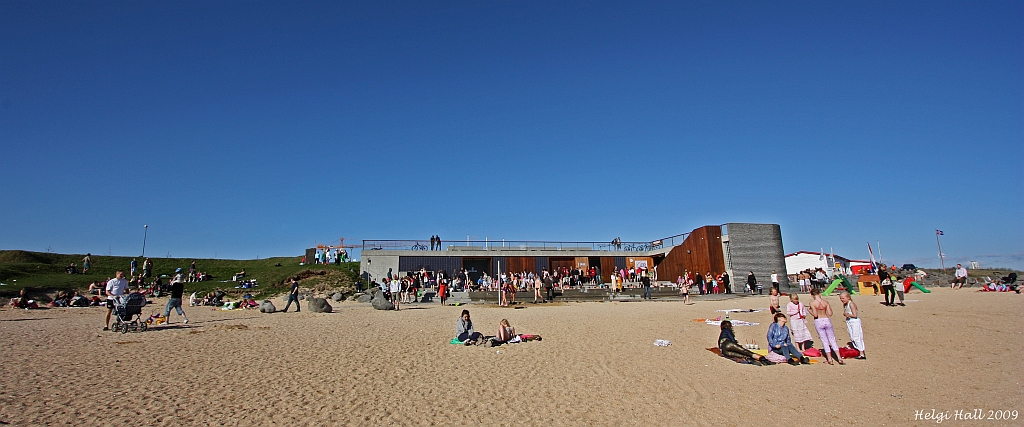
The beach in Nauthólsvík, Iceland

- Nauthólsvík

=== Indonesia ===
- Nusa Dua
- Bali
- Nusa Penida
- Nusa Ceningan
- Nusa Lembongan
- Kuta, Bali
- Legian
- Seminyak
- Belitung
- Canggu
- Lombok
- Labuan Bajo
- Manado
- Sabang
- Mentawai
- Serang
- Parangtritis
- Bulukumba
- Gunungkidul
- Sumba
- Wakatobi

=== Ireland ===
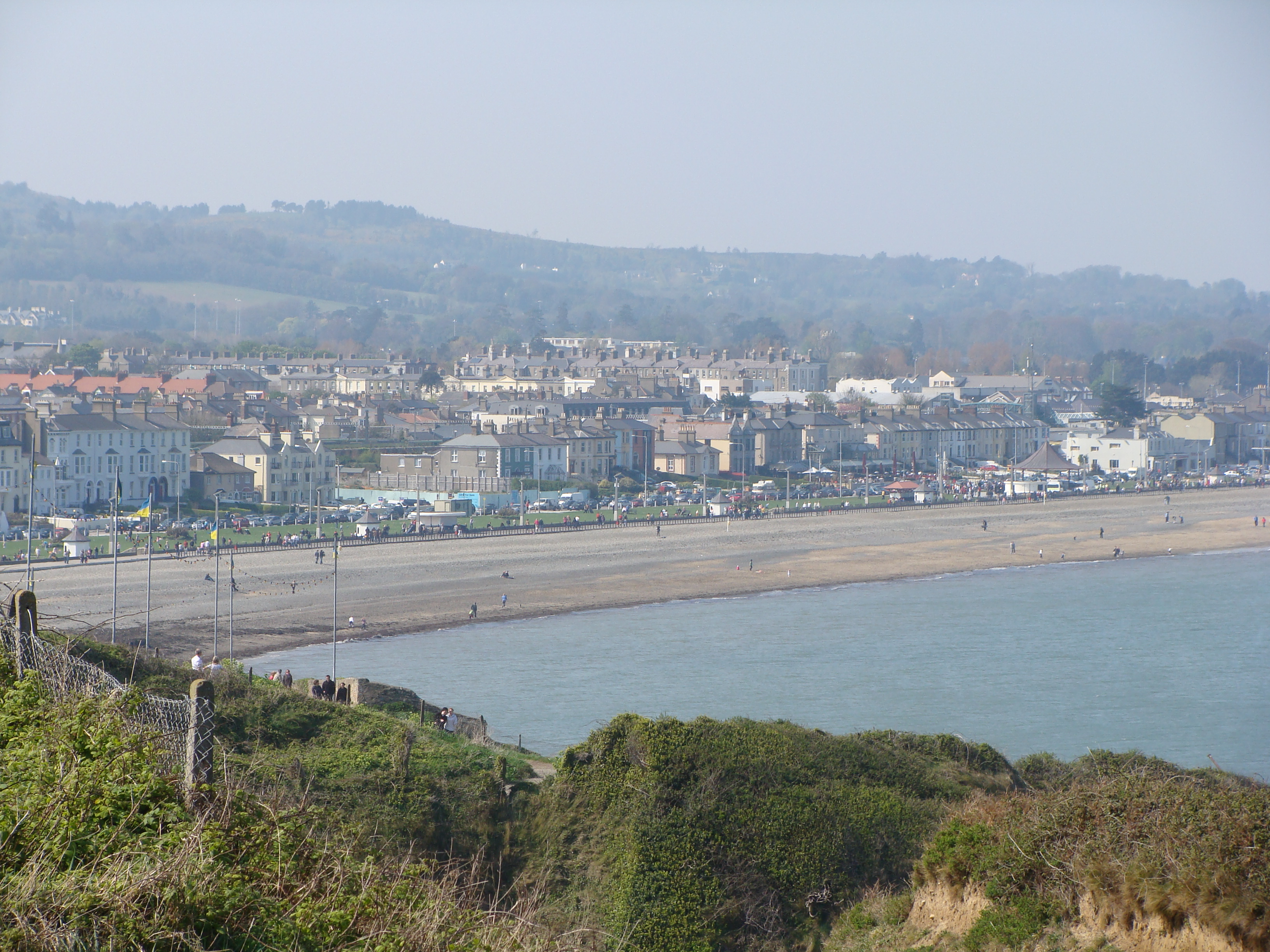
The seafront in Bray, County Wicklow, Ireland

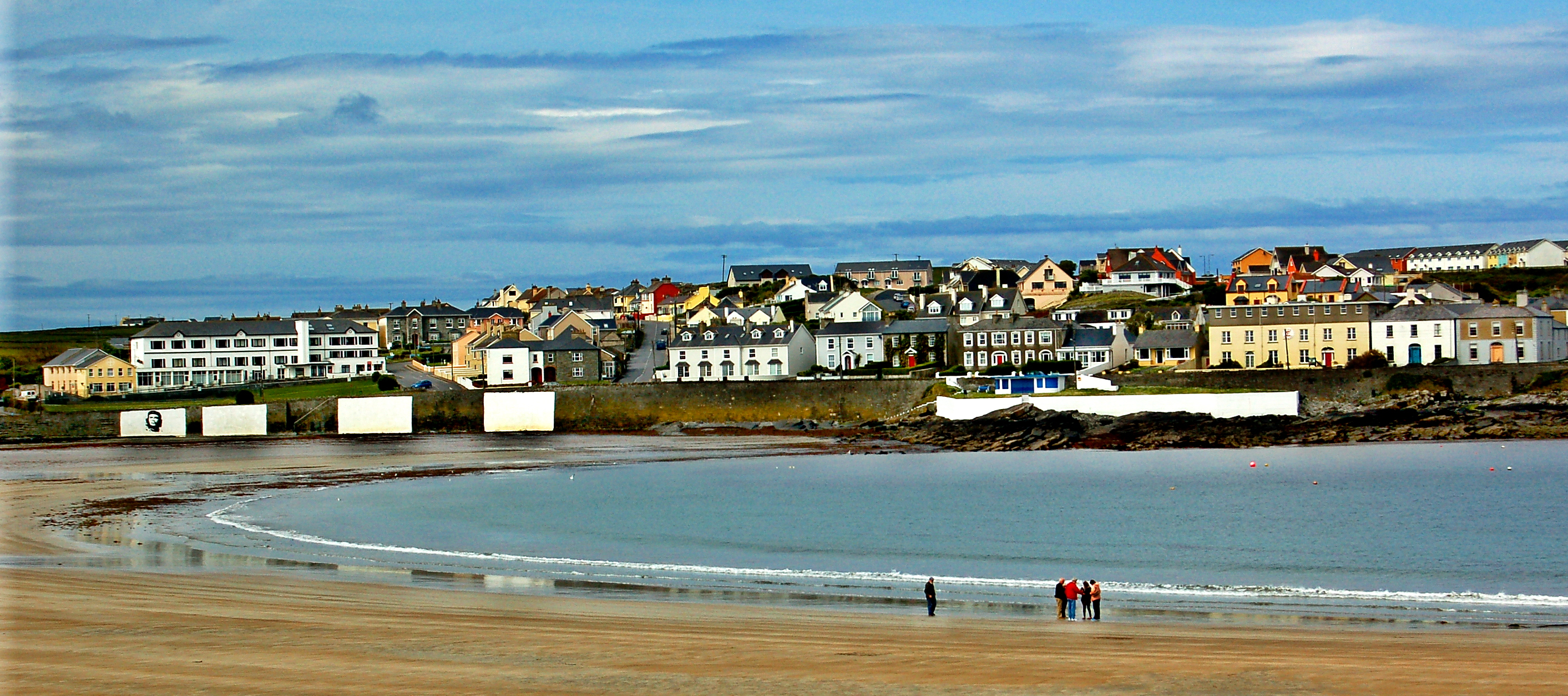
Kilkee on the west coast of Ireland

The 'Irish Riviera' on the South Coast of Ireland features the seaside resorts of Youghal, Ardmore, Dungarvan, Cóbh and Ballycotton, all set close to the south coast of Ireland. Youghal has been a favoured holiday destination for over 100 years, situated on the banks of the River Blackwater as it reaches the sea. Dungarvan is a seaside market town beneath the mountains in the centre of the Irish south coast. Kinsale is often described as a yachting town, with a diverse range of restaurants.

Seaside resorts in the East of Ireland developed after the introduction of rail travel. The Dublin and Kingstown Railway introduced day-trippers from Dublin to Kingstown (now Dún Laoghaire) in South Dublin, and the coastal town became Ireland's first seaside resort. Other South Dublin towns and villages such as Sandycove, Dalkey and Killiney grew as seaside resorts when the rail network was expanded. Since the opening of Bray Daly Station in 1852, the County Wicklow coastal town of Bray has become the largest seaside resort on the East Coast of Ireland. The town of Greystones, five miles south of Bray, also grew as a seaside resort when the railway line was extended in 1855. Other seaside resorts include Courtown and Rosslare Strand in County Wexford.

Ulster has a number of seaside resorts, such as Portrush, situated on the north coast, with its two beaches and a world-famous golf course, Royal Portrush Golf Club. Other Ulster seaside resorts are Newcastle, located on the east coast at the foot of the Mourne Mountains; Ballycastle; Portstewart; Rathmullan; Bundoran and Bangor. Bangor Marina is one of the largest in Ireland and the marina has on occasion been awarded the Blue Flag for attention to environmental issues.

The main seaside towns in the west of Ireland are in County Clare; the largest are Lahinch and Kilkee. Lahinch is a popular surfing location.

Like British resorts, many seaside towns in Ireland have turned to other entertainment industries. Larger resorts such as Bray or Portrush host air shows, while most resorts host summer festivals.

=== Israel ===
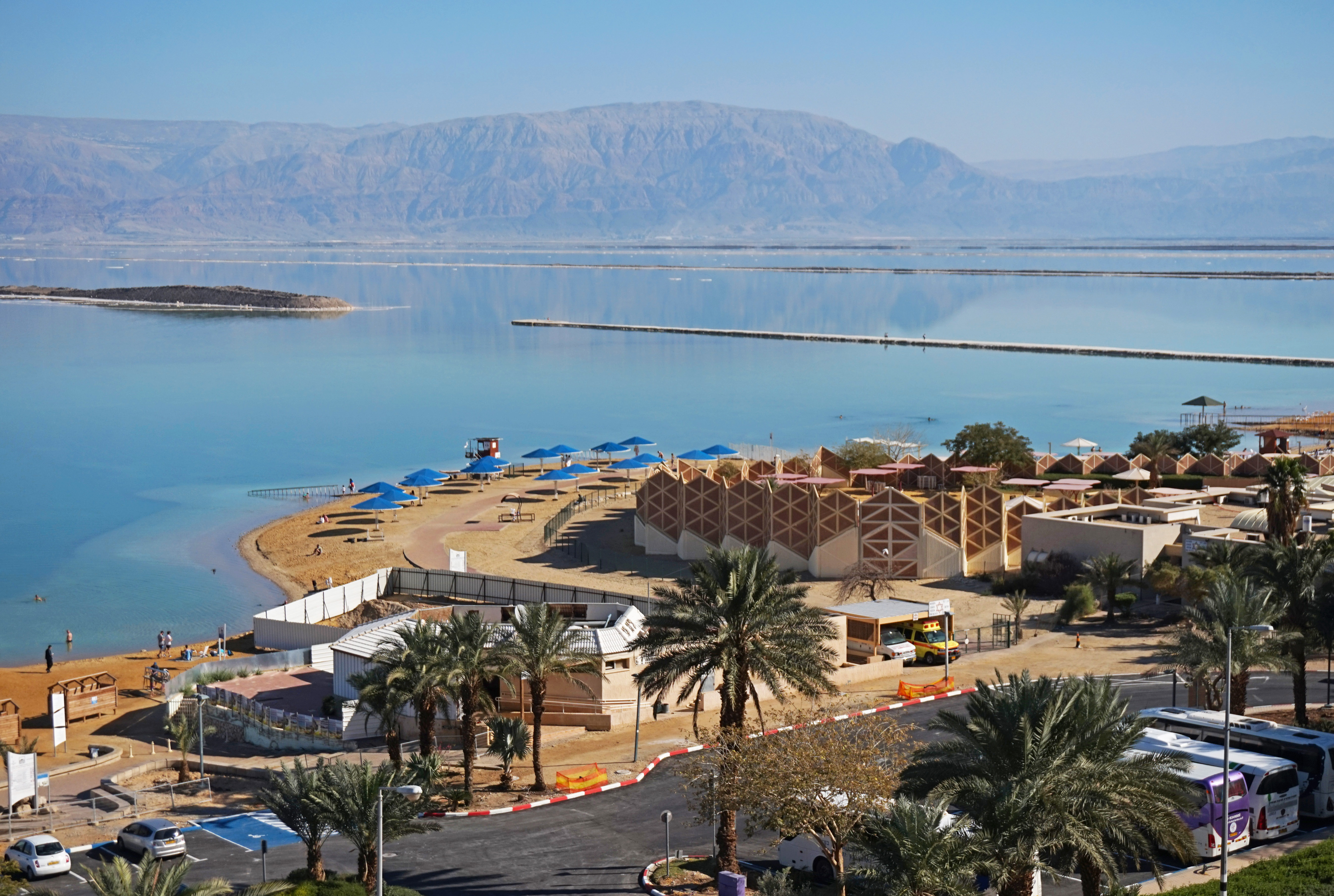
Ein Bokek on the Dead Sea in Israel

Israel is a major tourist area. Tourism in Israel is one of the major sources of income, with beautiful beaches, such as those found on the Mediterranean Sea and the Red Sea. Most tourists come from the United States and European countries. Other resorts include:

- Ashdod
- Ashkelon
- Eilat
- Ein Bokek
- Herzliya
- Netanya
- Tel Aviv

=== Italy ===
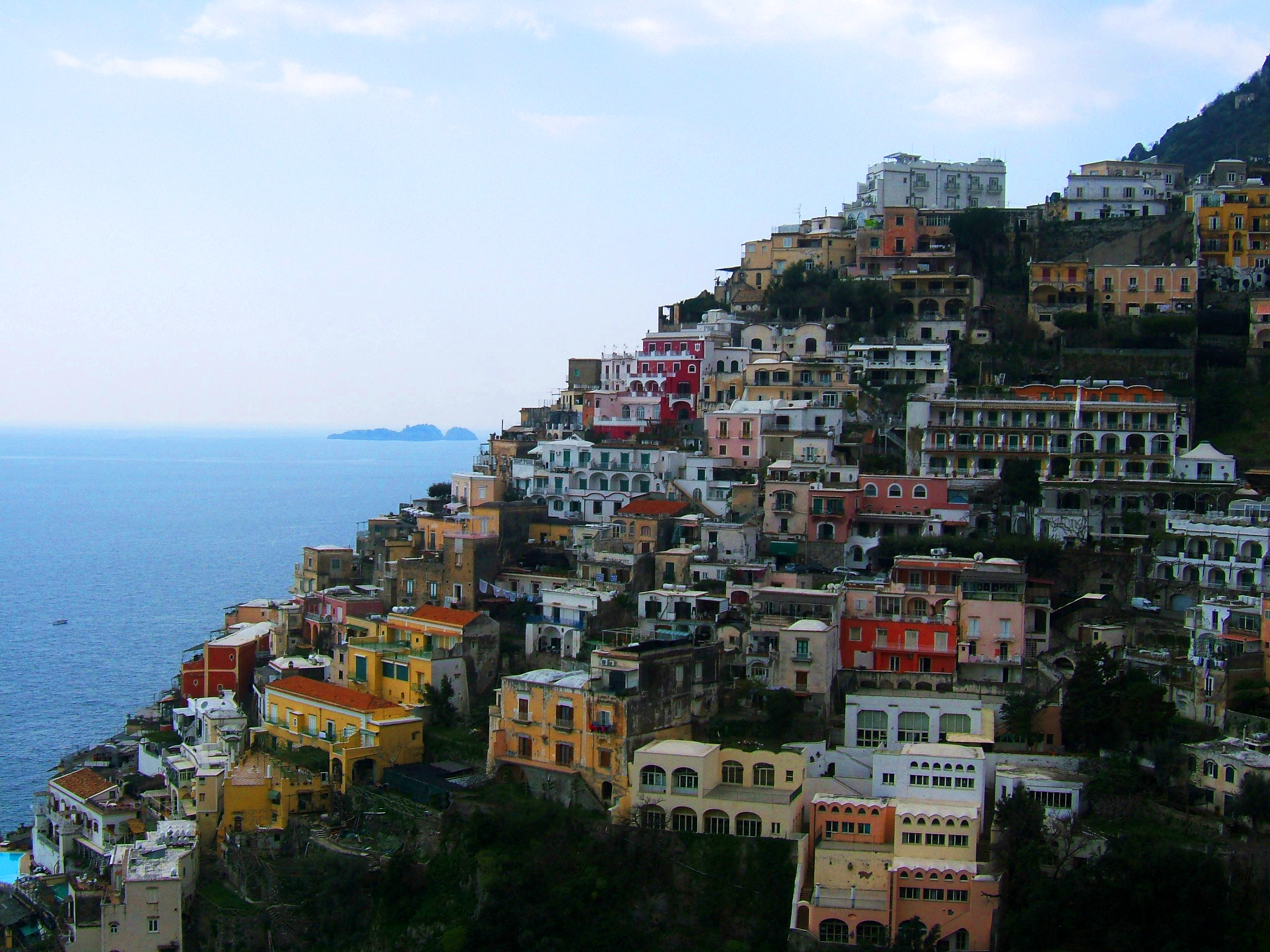
Positano and its sea in Italy

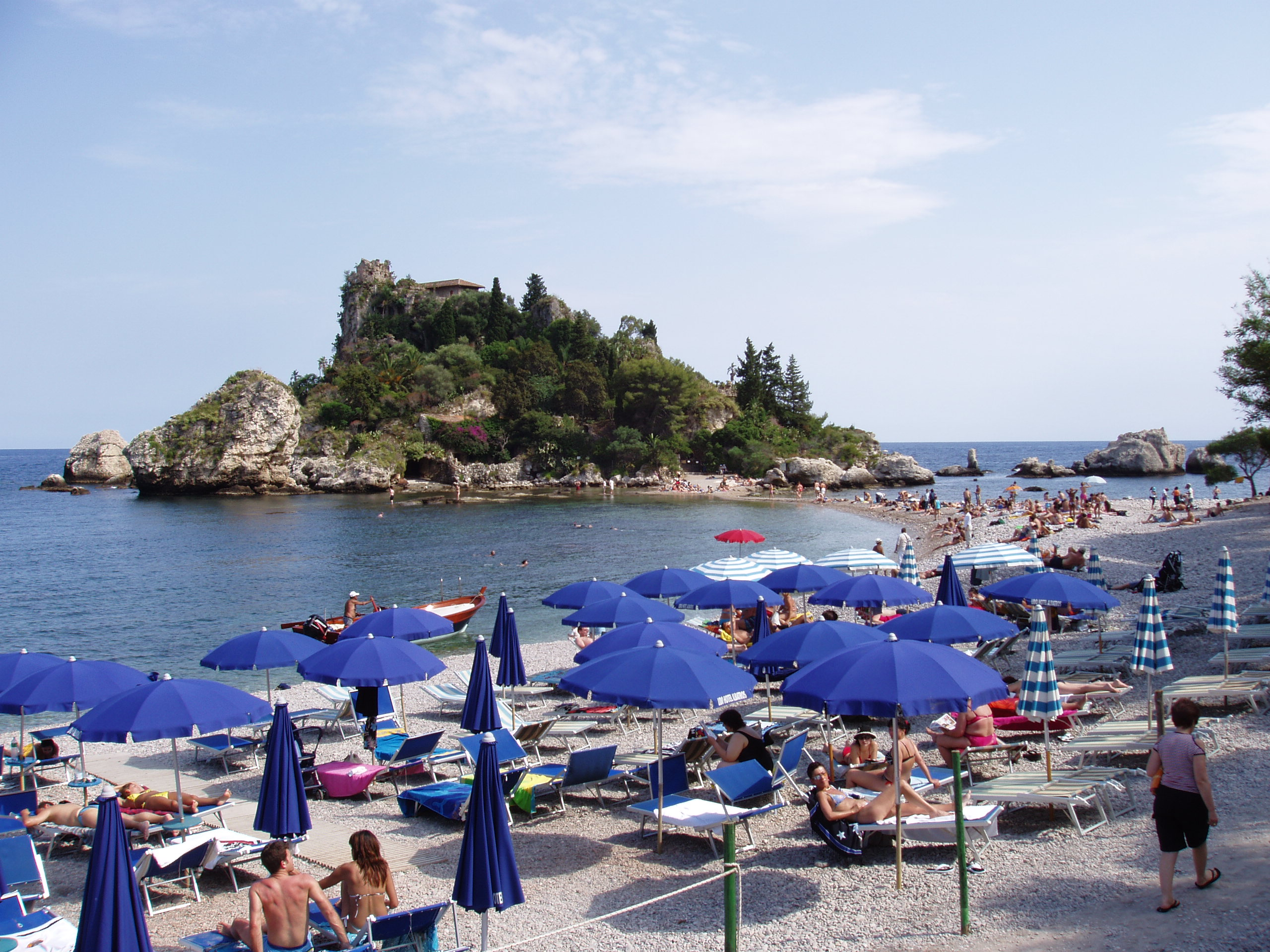
A beach in Taormina, Italy

Italy is known for its beach resorts that are visited by both local and foreign tourists. Many of these have a history of tourism that dates back to the 19th century.

Beach resorts include (among many others):

- Acciaroli, Pollica
- Alassio
- Alba Adriatica
- Alghero
- Agropoli
- Amalfi
- Amantea
- Anzio
- Ascea
- Atena Lucana
- Atrani
- Barcola
- Baia Domizia
- Berchidda
- Bibione
- Budoni
- Calangianus
- Capalbio
- Capri island
- Castel Volturno
- Castellabate
- Castellamare di Stabia
- Cattolica
- Caorle
- Cefalù
- Cesenatico
- Cetara
- Elba
- Follonica
- Forte dei Marmi
- Finale Ligure
- Fregene, Fiumicino
- Furore
- Gaeta
- Gallipoli
- Gianola, Formia
- Gioia Tauro
- Giulianova
- Golfo Aranci
- Grosseto
- Grottammare
- Ischia island
- Jesolo
- Ladispoli
- Lago Patria
- La Maddalena
- Lido di Ostia, Rome
- Licola
- Lignano Sabbiadoro
- Livorno
- Loiri Porto San Paolo
- Maiori
- Manfredonia
- Maratea
- Marina di Minturno, Minturno
- Milano Marittima, Cervia
- Minori
- Mondragone
- Monte Argentario
- Nettuno
- Numana
- Orbetello
- Oschiri
- Ostuni
- Palau
- Palinuro, Centola
- Panarea island
- Pescara
- Pizzo Calabro, Pizzo
- Procida island
- Policoro
- Polignano a Mare
- Pomezia
- Ponza island
- Portofino
- Porto Cervo
- Porto Ercole, Monte Argentario
- Porto Rotondo, Olbia
- Positano
- Praia a mare
- Praiano
- Ravello
- Riccione
- Rimini
- Sabaudia
- San Benedetto del Tronto
- Sanremo
- San Vito Lo Capo
- Santa Margherita Ligure
- Santa Maria di Leuca
- Santa Teresa Gallura
- Scala
- Scalea
- Scanzano Jonico
- Scauri, Minturno
- Senigallia
- Sestri Levante
- Silvi Marina, Silvi
- Sorrento
- Soverato
- Sperlonga
- Stintino
- Taormina
- Termoli
- Terracina
- Tramonti
- Tropea
- Varazze
- Varcaturo, Giugliano in Campania
- Viareggio
- Ventotene island
- Versilia
- Vico Equense
- Vieste
- Vietri sul Mare
- Villasimius
- Vindicio, Formia

=== Japan ===
There are seaside resorts in Honshu, Shikoku, and Kyushu, but Okinawa is particularly known for its beaches.

=== Jordan ===
All seaside resorts in Jordan are located in Aqaba, the only seaport in Jordan. Seaside resorts of Aqaba include Ayla Oasis and Marsa Zayed in the Tala Bay region.

=== Kenya ===
- Malindi
- Mombasa

=== South Korea ===
Many seaside resorts are located in Gyeongsang, Jeolla, Chungcheong, Gangwon, Gyeonggi, Incheon, Ulsan and Busan.

=== Latvia ===
- Jūrmala
- Liepāja
- Ventspils

=== Lithuania ===
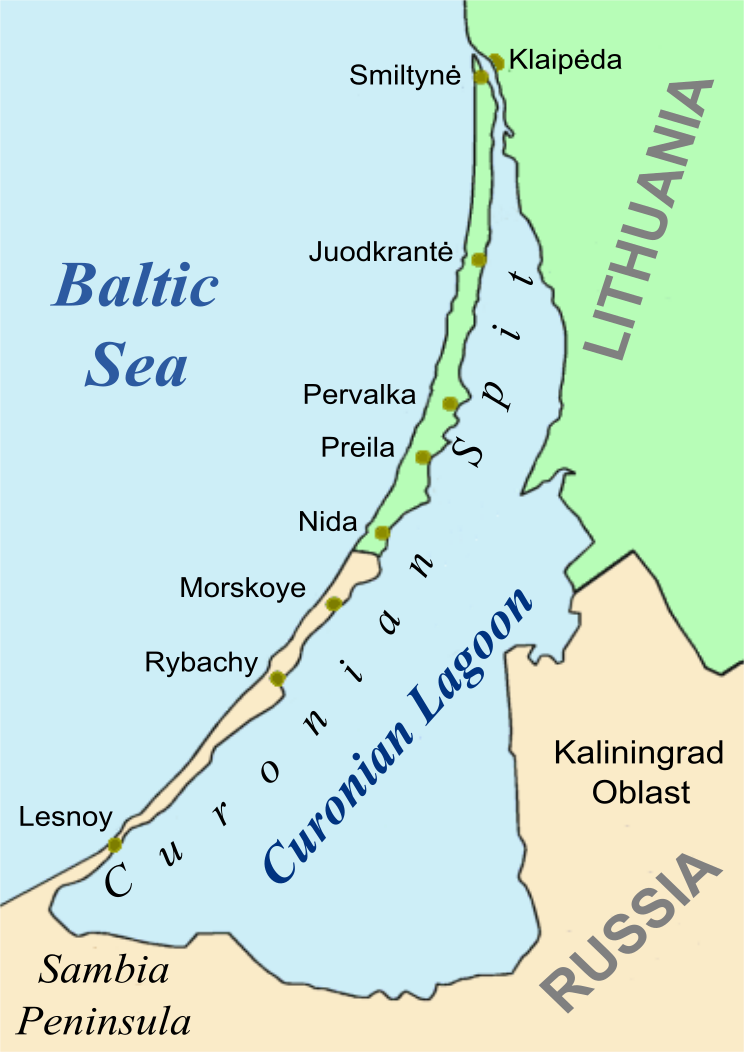
A map of Lithuania and Russia's resorts on the Curonian Spit

- Juodkrantė
- Nida
- Palanga
- Pervalka
- Preila
- Šventoji

=== Malaysia ===
- Langkawi
- Batu Ferringhi
- Pangkor
- Port Dickson
- Desaru
- Cherating
- Kuala Terengganu
- Kapas
- Perhentian Islands
- Redang
- Tioman
- Tanjung Aru
- Gaya
- Mabul
- Manukan
- Sipadan

=== Malta ===
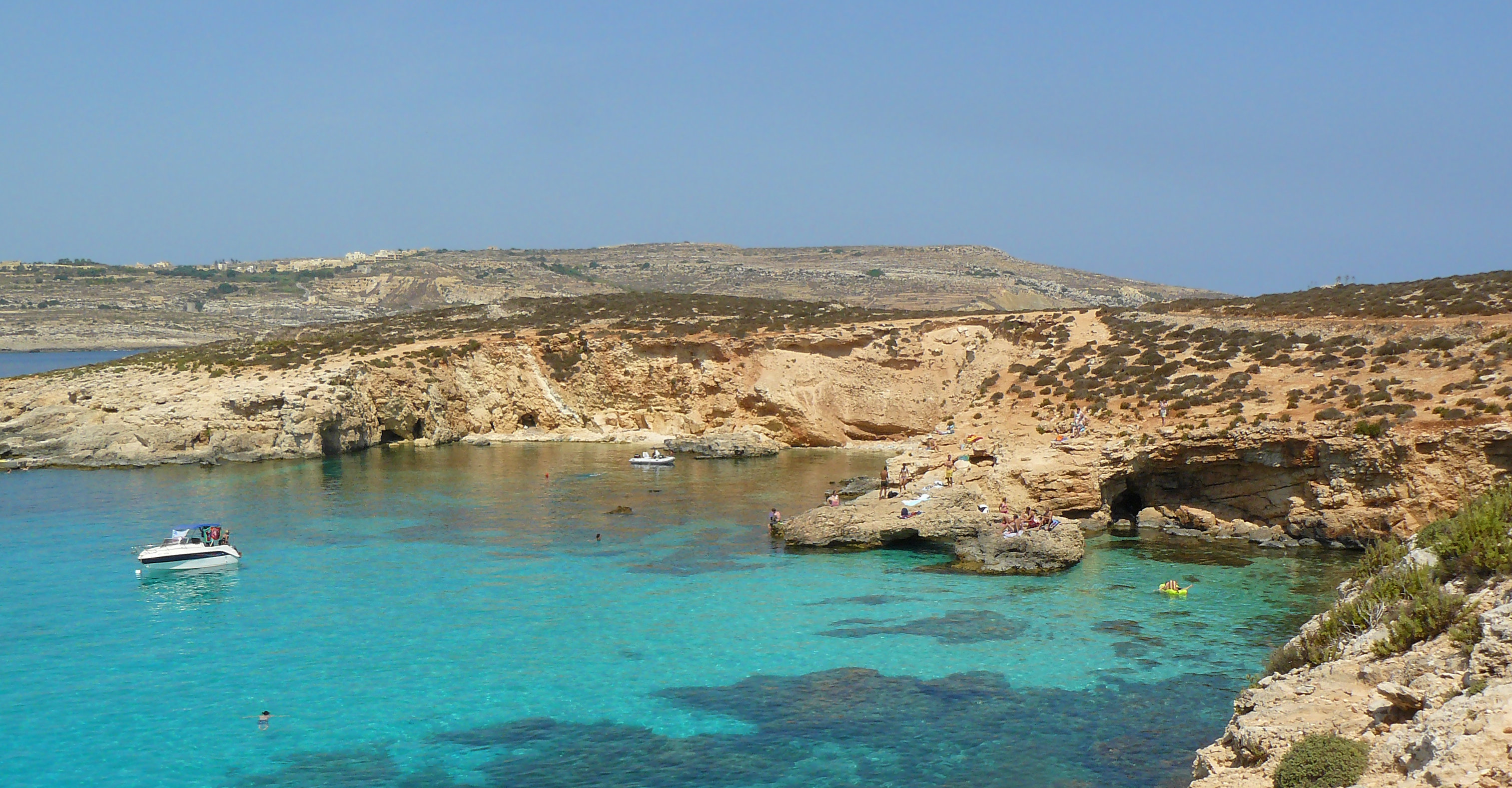
Comino in Malta

The following are the main resort towns in Malta:

- Northern towns of Mellieħa, St. Paul's Bay, Buġibba and Qawra
- Central towns of Sliema, St. Julian's and Paceville
- Southern towns of Birżebbuġa and Marsascala
- Village of Marsalforn in Gozo
- Parts of the island of Comino

=== Mexico ===
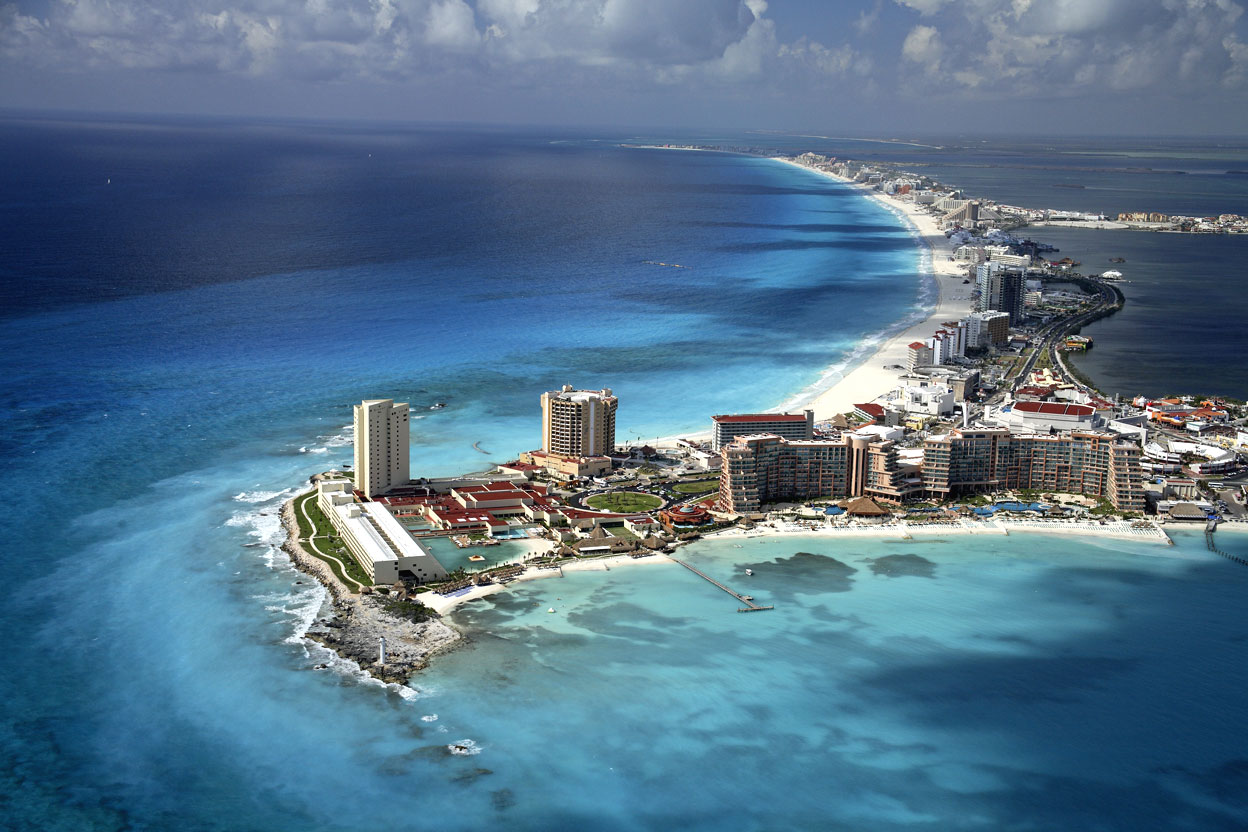
Cancún in Mexico

Mexican resorts are popular with North American and local residents, with Mexico being the second most visited country in the Americas. Notable resorts on the mainland and the Baja Gold Coast and Peninsula include:

- Acapulco
- Baja Mar
- Cabo San Lucas
- Cancún (Hotel Zone)
- Ensenada
- Guaymas
- Ixtapa
- Manzanillo
- Mazatlán
- Playa del Carmen
- Puerto Peñasco
- Puerto Vallarta
- Rosarito Beach
- Tijuana (Playas de Tijuana)
- Tulum
- Veracruz

=== Netherlands ===
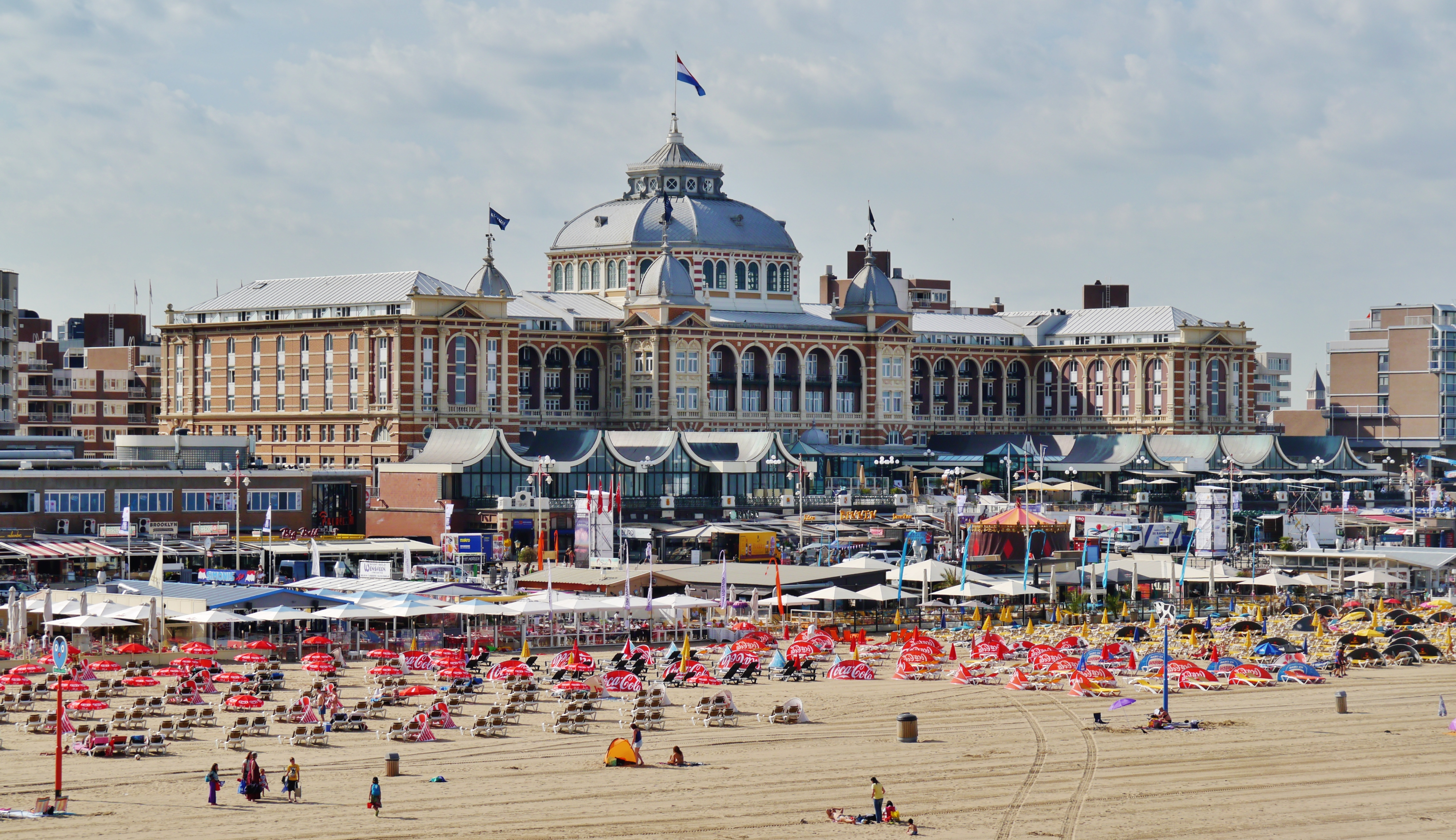
Kurhaus of Scheveningen in the Netherlands

There are many seaside resorts on the Dutch coast, chiefly in the provinces of North Holland, South Holland and Zeeland, as well as on the West Frisian Islands.

A selection includes:

- Bergen, North Holland
- Domburg
- Katwijk
- Monster, South Holland
- Noordwijk
- Scheveningen
- Zandvoort

=== New Zealand ===
- Kaiteretere
- Mapua
- Marahau
- Tahunanui
- Mount Maunganui

=== Norway ===
- Kristiansand
- Bystranda
- Sola
- Fevik
- Risør

=== Philippines ===
- Boracay
- El Nido
- Island Garden City of Samal
- Cebu
- Malay (Boracay)
- Pagudpud
- Siargao
- Puerto Galera
- Calanggaman Island

=== Poland ===
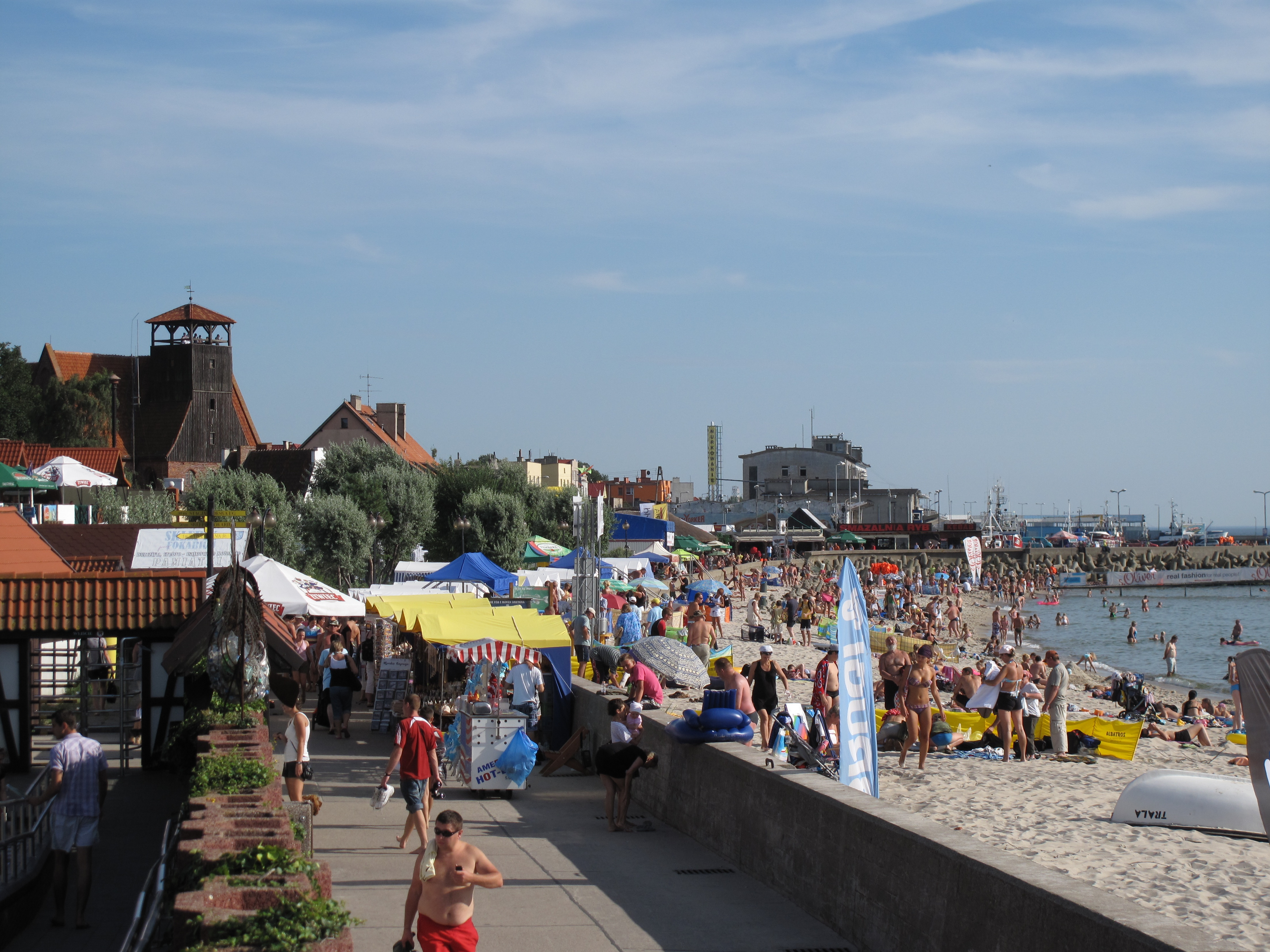
Hel in Poland

Poland's coast on the Baltic Sea includes many traditional seaside resorts established throughout the 18th-20th centuries. In the past the resorts have received mostly domestic tourism, however, since the 1990s, following the opening of Polish borders, the international tourism has grown considerably. Notable resorts include:

- Świnoujście
- Międzyzdroje
- Dziwnów
- Kołobrzeg
- Mielno
- Darłowo
- Ustka
- Władysławowo
- Chłapowo
- Jastarnia
- Hel
- Sopot

=== Portugal ===
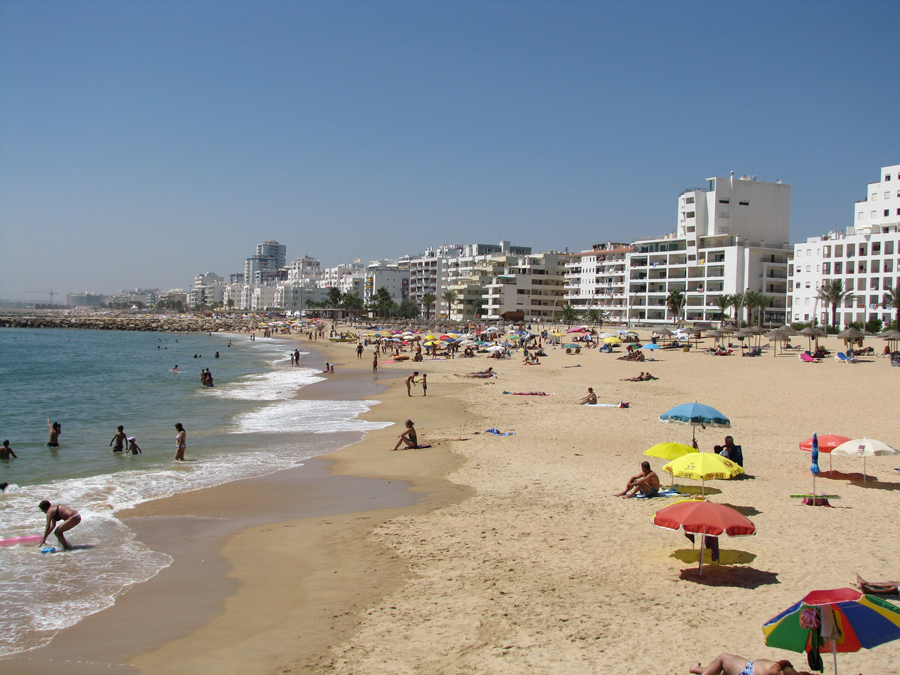
Quarteira in Portugal

Many local and foreign tourists visit Portuguese resorts, particularly those on the Algarve and Madeira regions. Notable resorts include:

- Albufeira
- Cascais
- Estoril
- Faro
- Figueira da Foz
- Funchal
- Lagos
- Póvoa de Varzim
- Praia da Luz
- Quarteira

=== Romania ===
The Romanian Black Sea resorts stretch from the Danube Delta in the north down to the Romanian-Bulgarian border in the south, along 275 kilometers of coastline.

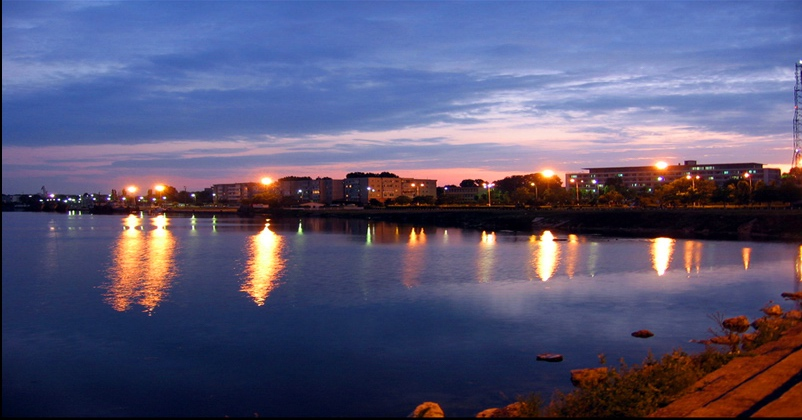
Mangalia Port in Mangalia, Romania

- 2 Mai
- Constanța
- Costinești
- Mamaia
- Mangalia
- Năvodari
- Neptun, Romania
- Vama Veche
- Venus, Romania
- Sulina

=== Russia ===
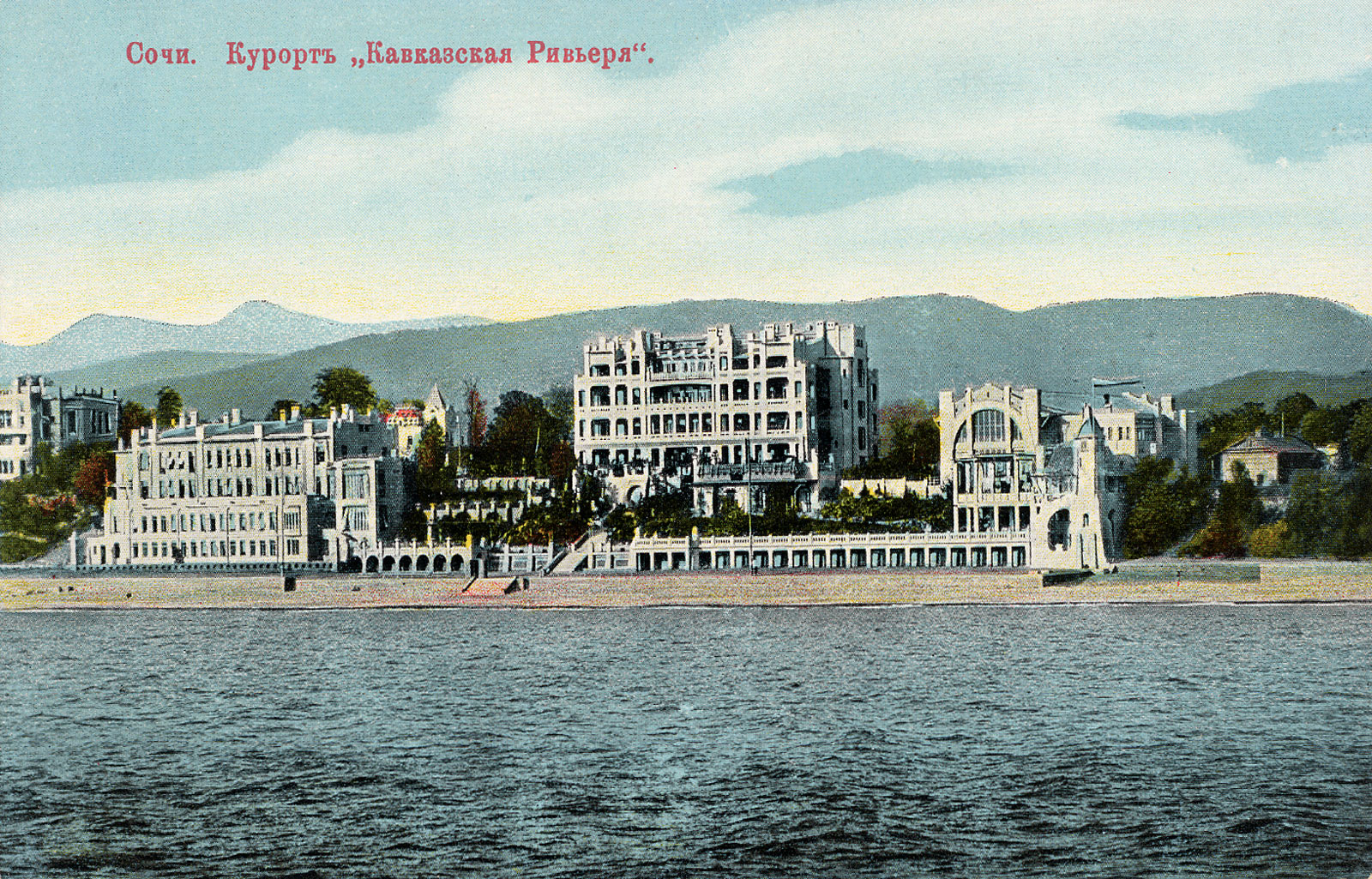
The "Caucasian Riviera" in Sochi, c. 1909

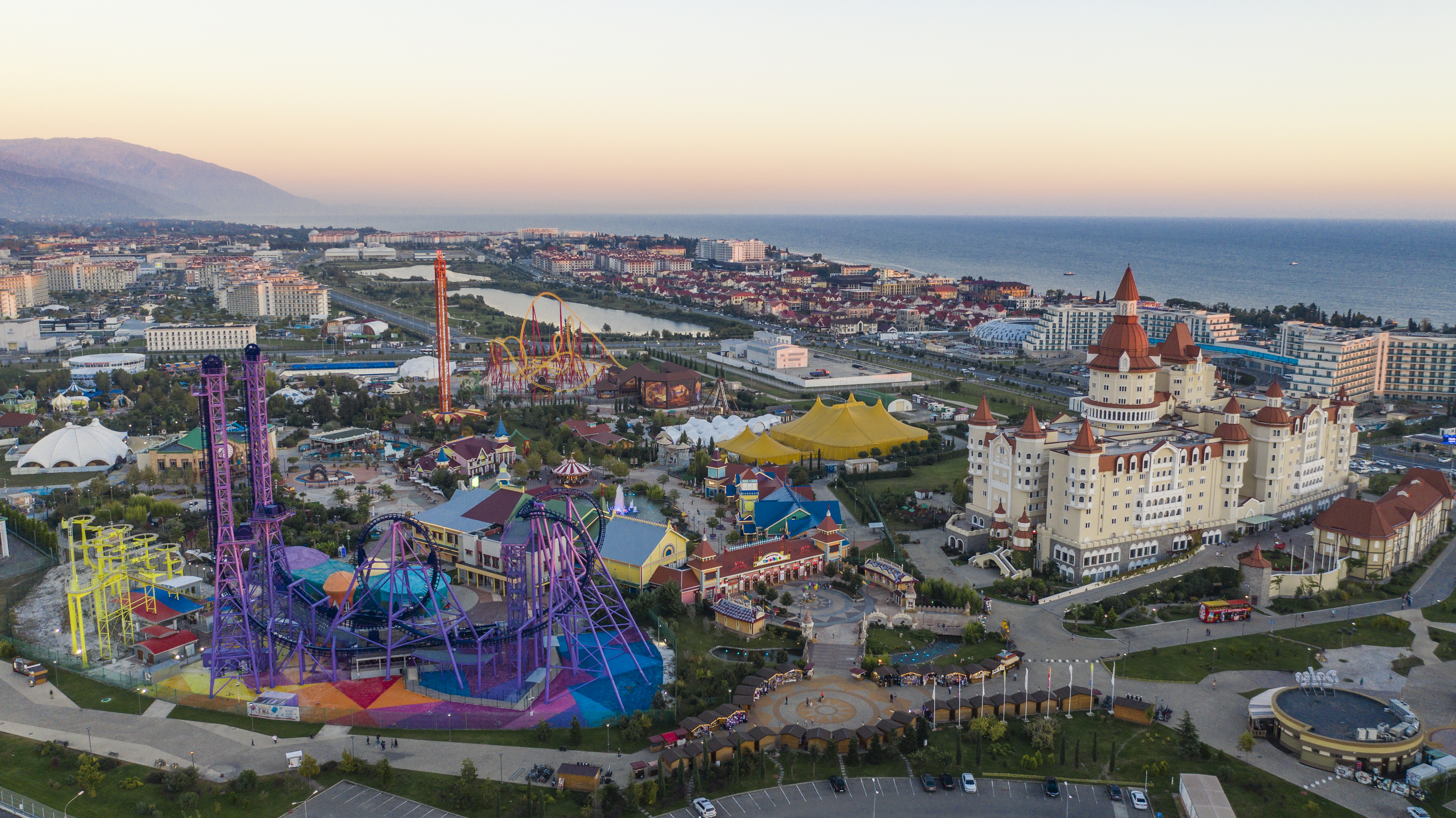
Sochi

- Anapa
- Gelendzhik
- Lazurnaya Bay
- Sestroretsk
- Sochi, including previously separate settlements Adler, Lazarevskoye, and Dagomys
- Svetlogorsk
- Yantarny
- Zelenogradsk

=== South Africa ===
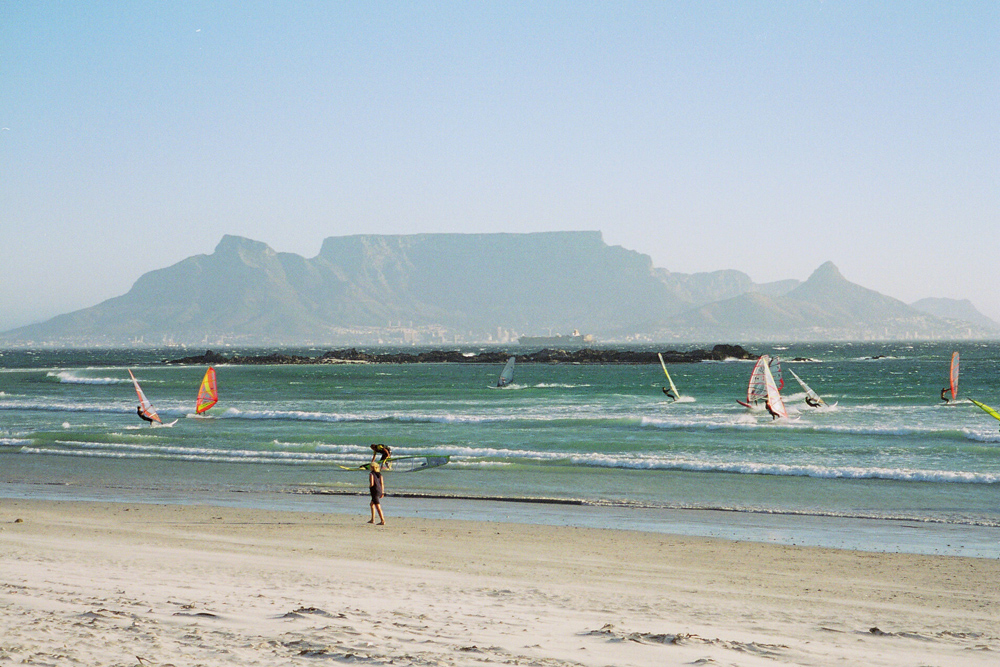
Cape Town, the most visited tourist destination in South Africa, has many beaches sprawling across its metropolitan area

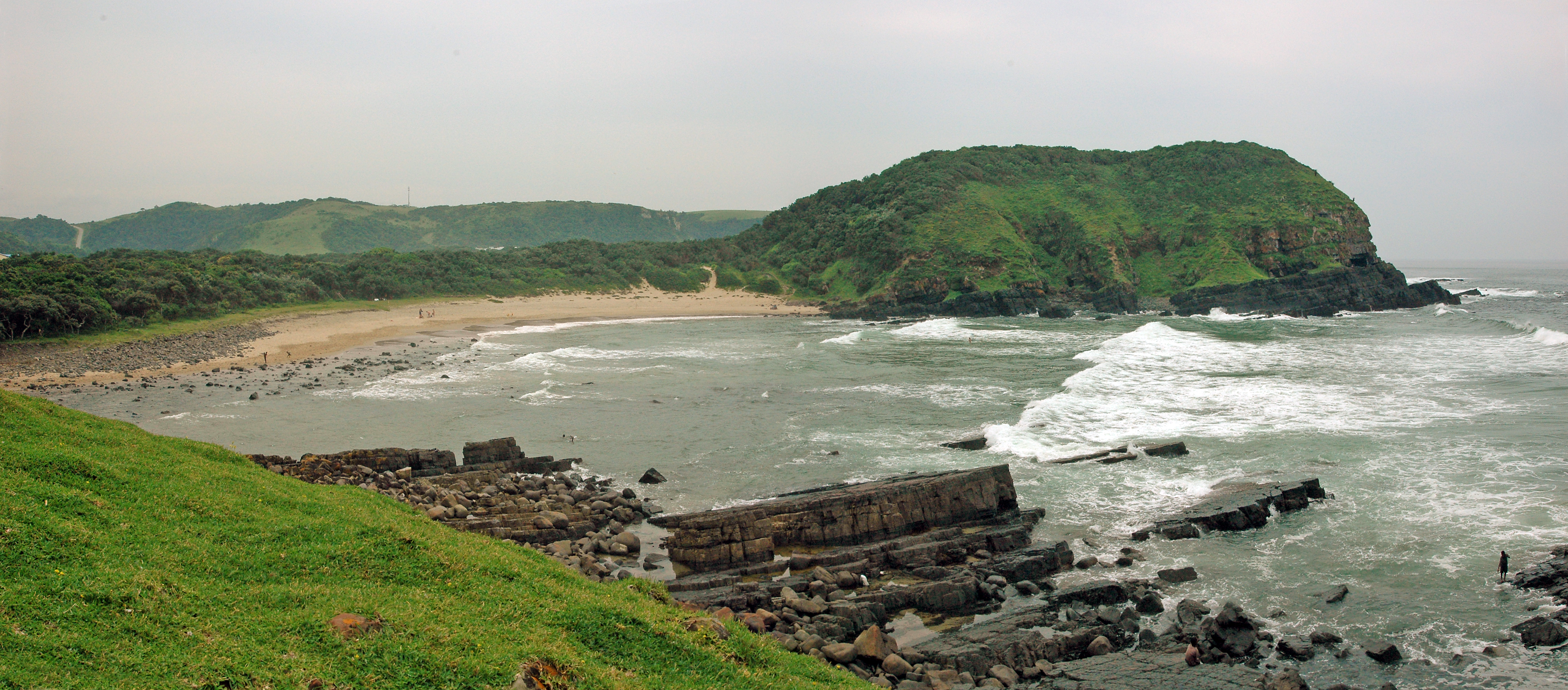
Coffee Bay, a small seaside resort on the Wild Coast, known for the Hole-in-the-wall, its views and beaches

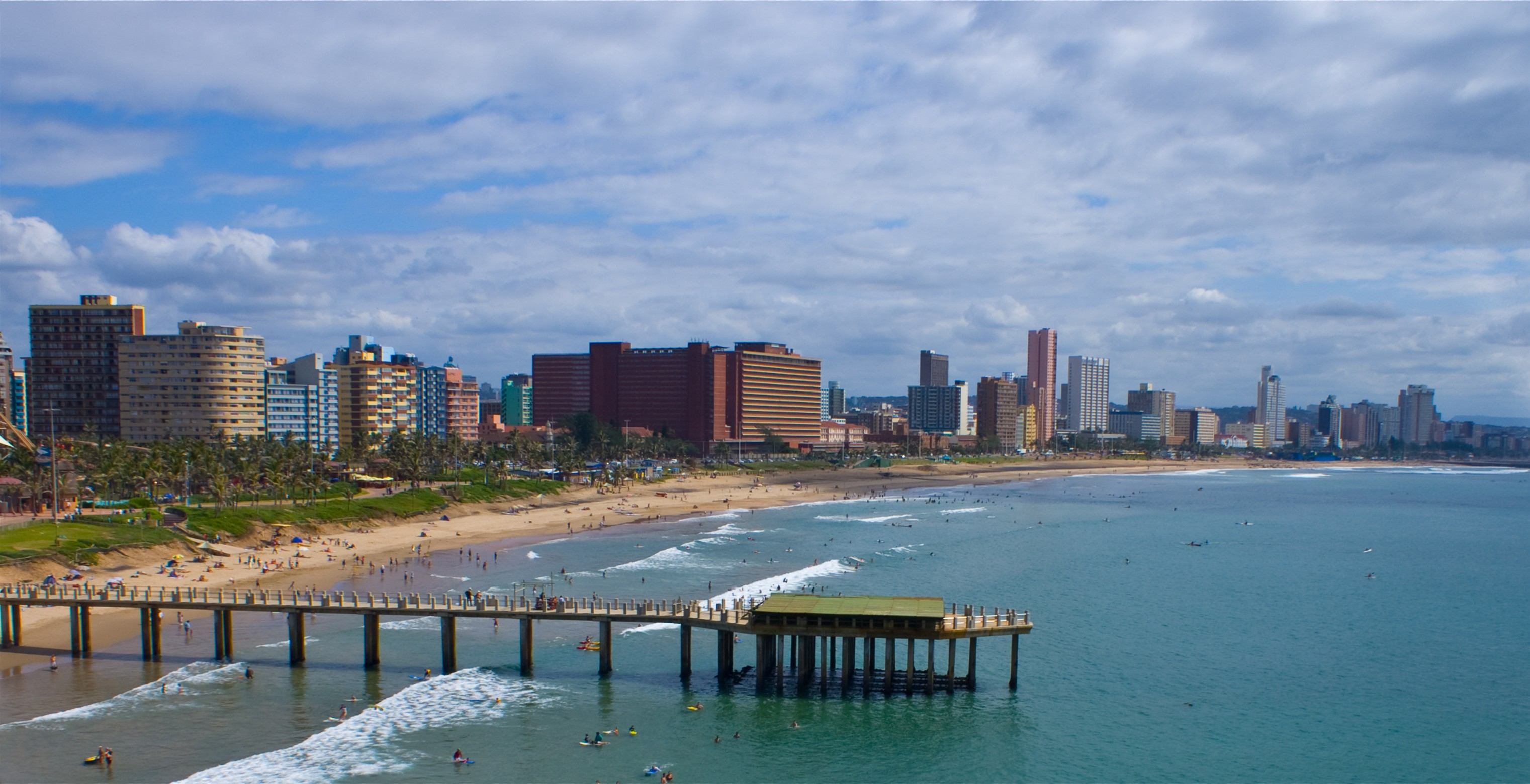
Durban, a major holiday destination on South Africa's east coast renowned for its warm weather all-year round

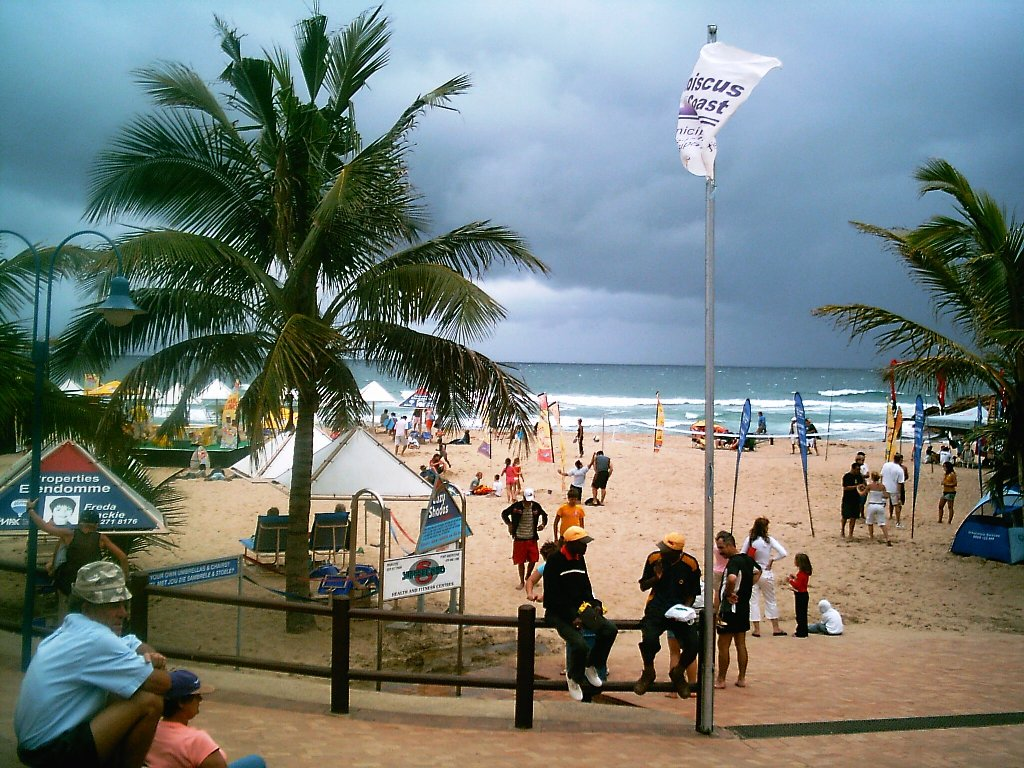
Margate, a holiday destination on South Africa's east coast and one of the most visited in the country

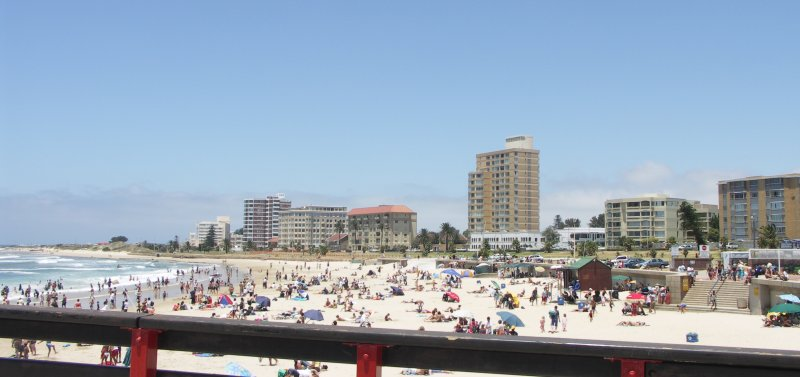
Port Elizabeth, a seaside city in the Eastern Cape province renowned for its surfing, temperate climate, and beautiful beaches

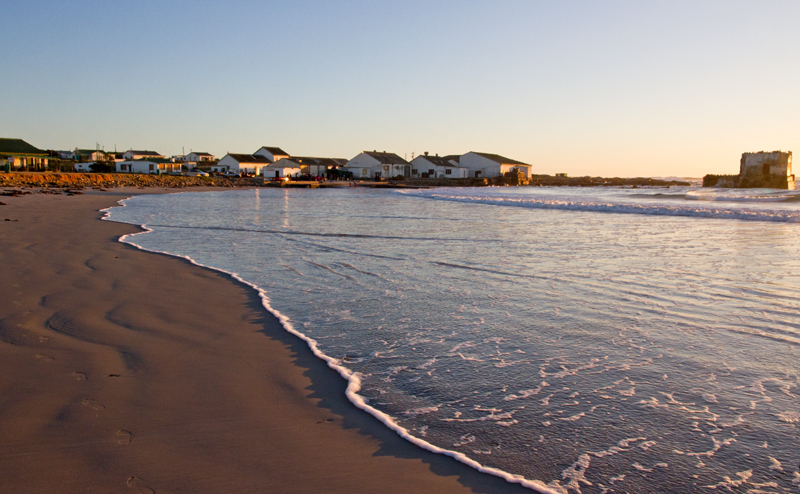
Hondeklip Bay, a coastal and fishing village on South Africa's west coast well known for its unspoiled beaches and its rock and tidal pools

- Alexander Bay
- Alkanstrand, Richards Bay
- Amanzimtoti
- Arniston
- Ballito
- Betty's Bay
- Bloubergstrand
- Boknesstrand
- Brenton-on-Sea
- Buffelsbaai
- Bushman's River Mouth
- Cape St Francis
- Cape Town
- Cape Vidal
- Cannon Rocks
- Chintsa
- Coffee Bay
- De Kelders
- Durban
- East London
- Elands Bay
- eMdloti
- Fish Hoek
- Franskraalstrand
- Gansbaai
- Gordon's Bay
- Gonubie
- Great Brak River
- Haga Haga
- Hamburg
- Hawston
- Hermanus
- Herolds Bay
- Hibberdene
- Hondeklip Bay
- Jacobsbaai
- Jeffreys Bay
- Kenton-on-Sea
- Keurboomstrand
- Kidd's Beach
- Kleinmond
- Kleinzee
- Knysna
- Kommetjie
- Kosi Bay
- L'Agulhas
- Lambert's Bay
- Langebaan
- Llandudno
- Margate
- Mazeppa Bay
- Mtunzini
- Muizenberg
- Morgans Bay
- Mossel Bay
- Nahoon
- Nature's Valley
- Noordhoek
- Onrus
- Paternoster
- Pearly Beach
- Pennington
- Plettenberg Bay
- Port Alfred
- Port Elizabeth
- Port Nolloth
- Port St Johns
- Pringle Bay
- Qolora Mouth
- Ramsgate
- Salt Rock
- Sardinia Bay
- Schoenmakerskop
- Scottburgh
- Sedgefield
- Shaka's Rock
- Simon's Town
- Sodwana Bay
- Southbroom
- St Francis Bay
- St Helena Bay
- St Lucia
- Stilbaai
- Stormsrivier
- Strand
- Strandfontein
- Struisbaai
- Tergniet
- Thukela Mouth
- uMhlanga
- Umzumbe
- Uvongo
- Victoria Bay
- Warner Beach, Kingsburgh
- Wilderness
- Witsand
- Yzerfontein
- Zinkwazi Beach

=== South America ===
Notable seaside resorts in South America include Búzios, Camboriú, Florianópolis, Fortaleza, Recife and Salvador in Brazil; Mar del Plata in Argentina; Piriapolis and Punta del Este in Uruguay; Easter Island and Viña del Mar in Chile; Barranquilla and Cartagena in Colombia; and Guayaquil, Salinas and the Galapagos Islands in Ecuador.

=== Spain ===
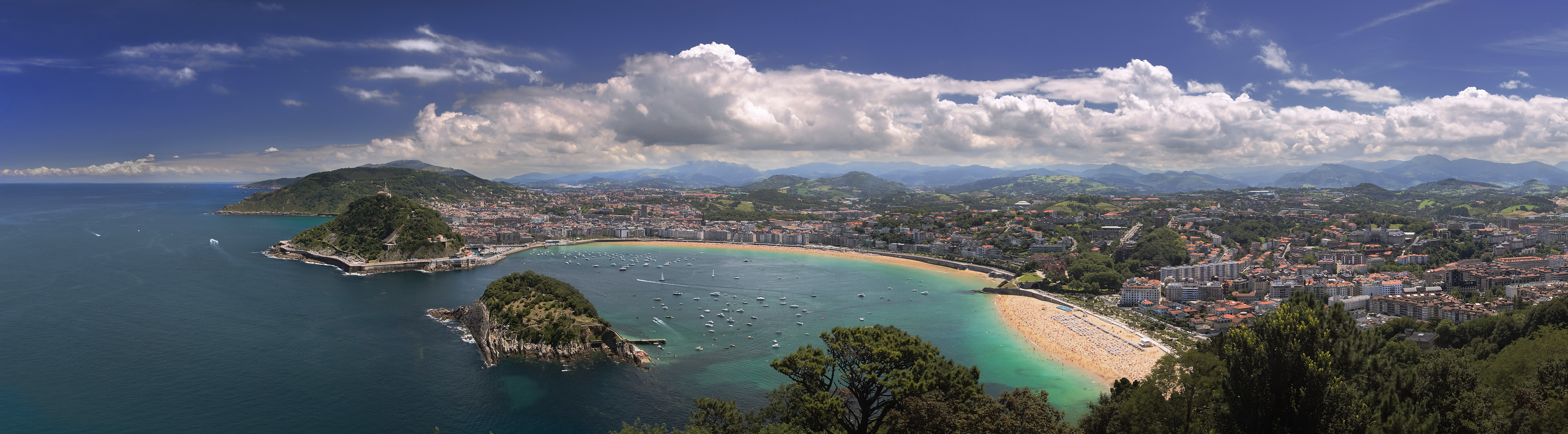
A panoramic view of San Sebastián in Spain

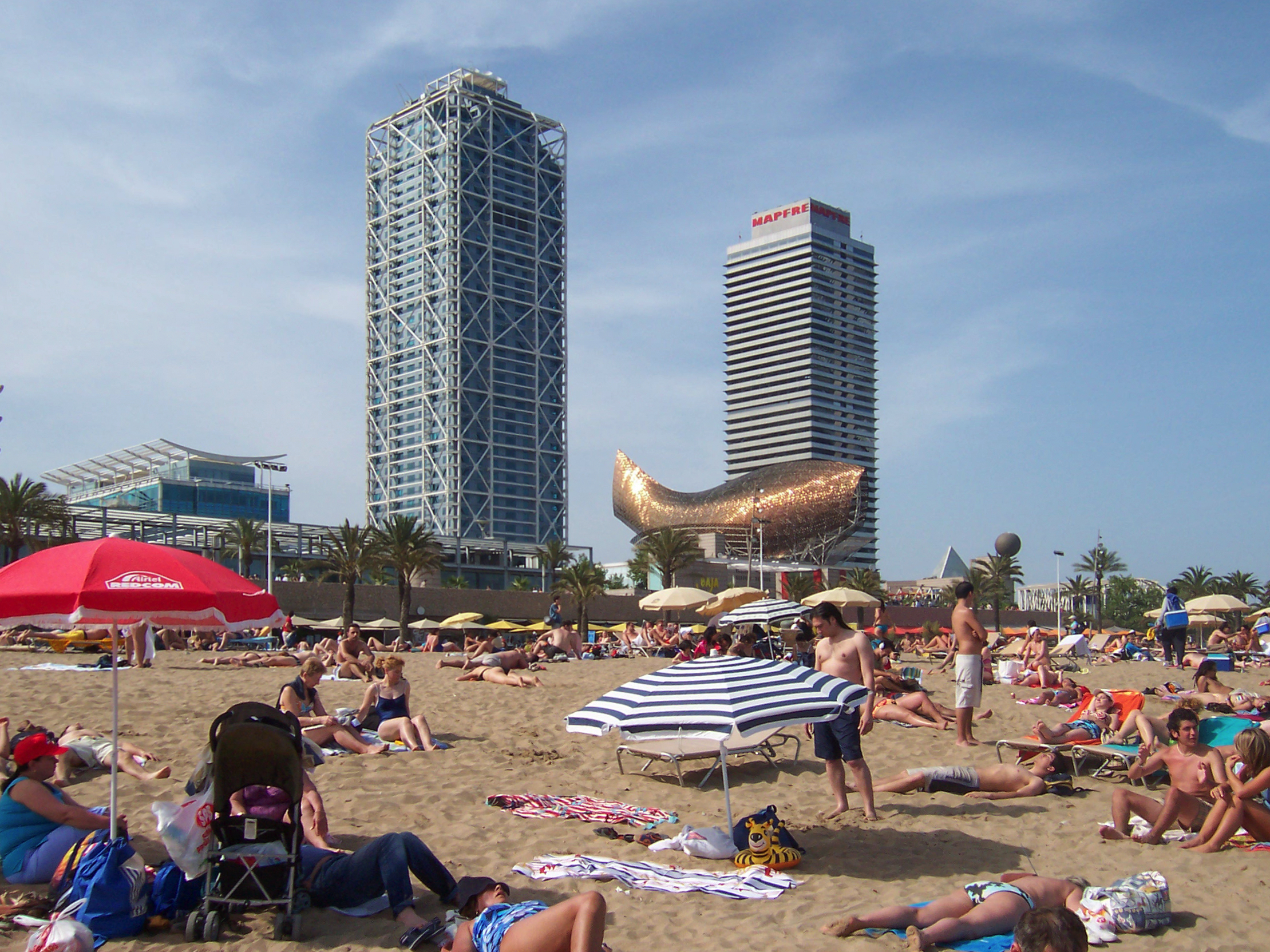
Barceloneta beach in Barcelona, Spain

Spanish resorts are popular with many locals and foreigners. Notable resorts on the mainland and islands include:

- Algeciras area
- Alicante
- Altea
- Barcelona area, with the best urban beaches in the world
- Benidorm
- Blanes
- Cadaqués
- Calpe
- Castell-Platja d'Aro
- Costa Blanca
- Costa Brava
- Costa de la Luz
- Costa del Sol
- Costa Tropical
- Dénia
- Empuriabrava
- Formentera island
- Gandía
- Lanzarote island
- Lloret de Mar
- Las Palmas de Gran Canaria area and other towns in the Canary Islands
- Málaga area and other suburbs on the Costa del Sol
- Murcia
- Nerja
- Palamós
- Palma de Mallorca area, Ibiza and other towns in the Balearic Islands
- Peñíscola
- Roses
- Salou area and other towns on the Costa Daurada
- Sant Feliu de Guíxols
- San Javier
- San Sebastián
- Sitges
- Tenerife
- Tossa de Mar
- Villajoyosa
- Vinaròs

=== Sweden ===
- Helsingborg
- Falsterbo
- Kullaberg
- Malmö

=== Tanzania ===
- Dar es Salaam
- Zanzibar

=== Thailand ===
- Pattaya
- Phuket
- Hua Hin - Cha-am
- Koh Samui

=== Turkiye ===
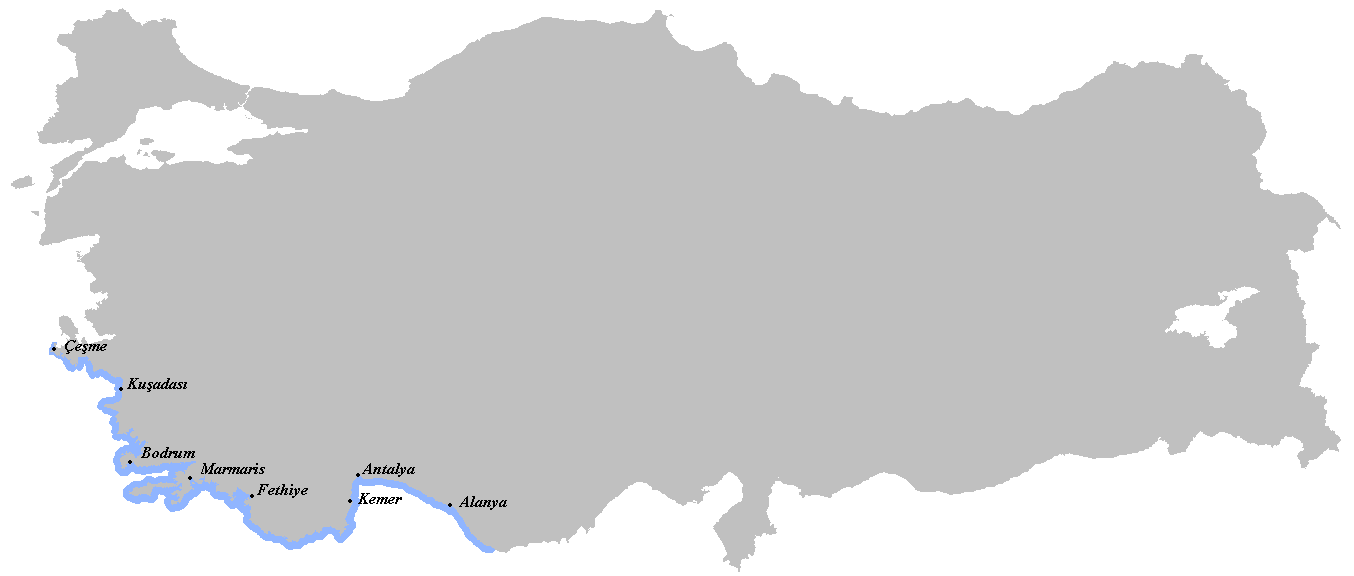
A map depicting the Turkish Riviera in blue, highlighting, from east to west, the major settlements of Alanya, Antalya, Kemer, Fethiye, Marmaris, Bodrum, Kuşadası, and Çeşme

=== Ukraine ===
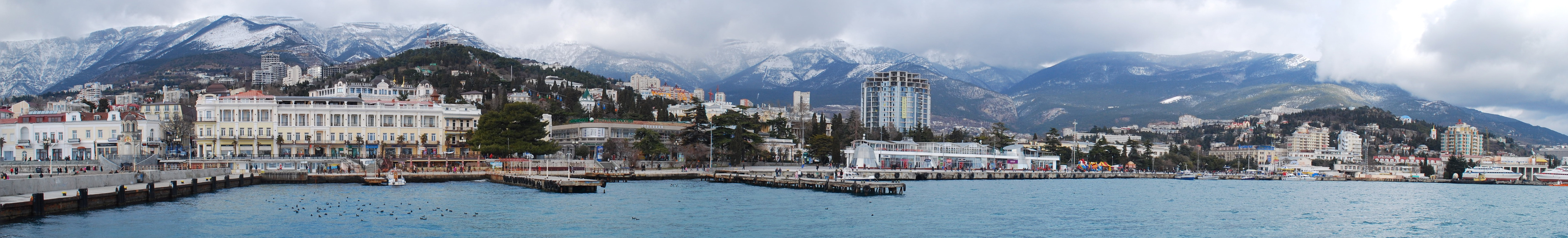
A panoramic view of Yalta

Some examples of Ukrainian seaside resort towns are:

- Crimea: Alupka, Alushta, Yevpatoria, Feodosiya, Foros, Gurzuf, Koktebel, Saky, Sudak, Yalta
- Kherson Oblast: Skadovsk
- Mykolaiv Oblast: Ochakov
- Odesa Oblast: Odesa

=== United Arab Emirates ===
- Abu Dhabi
- Dubai
- Ras al-Khaimah

=== United Kingdom ===
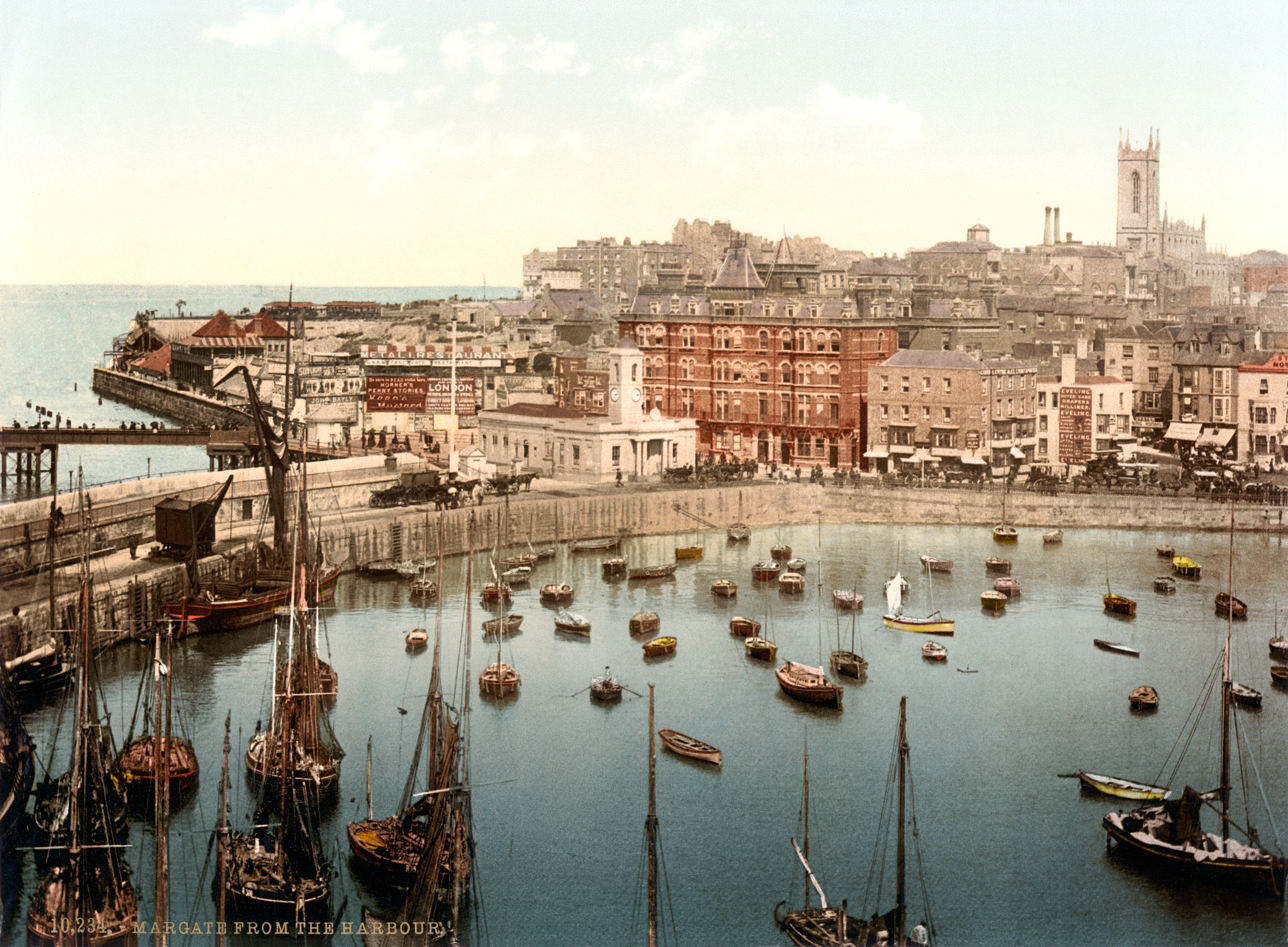
Margate in Kent, the first seaside resort of England, established in the 1750s

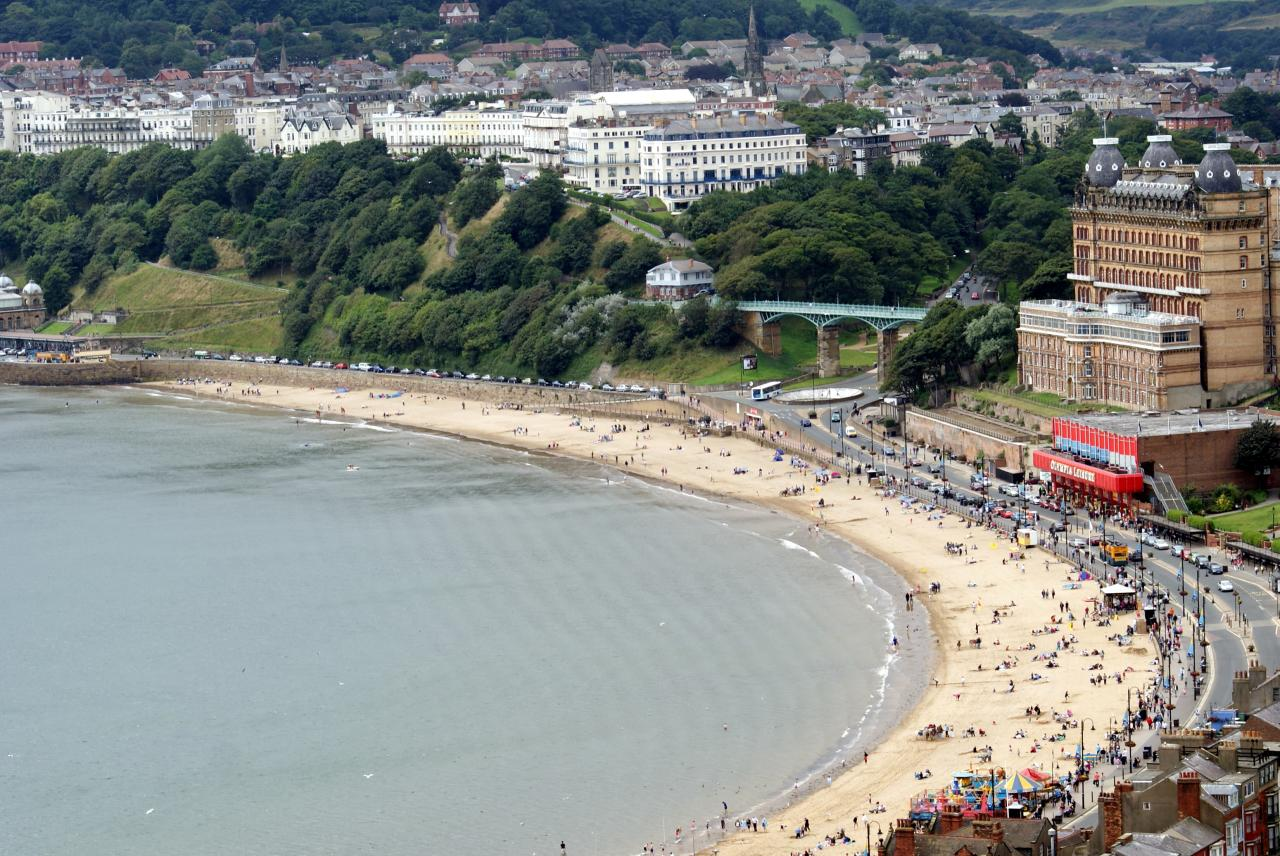
Scarborough's South Bay

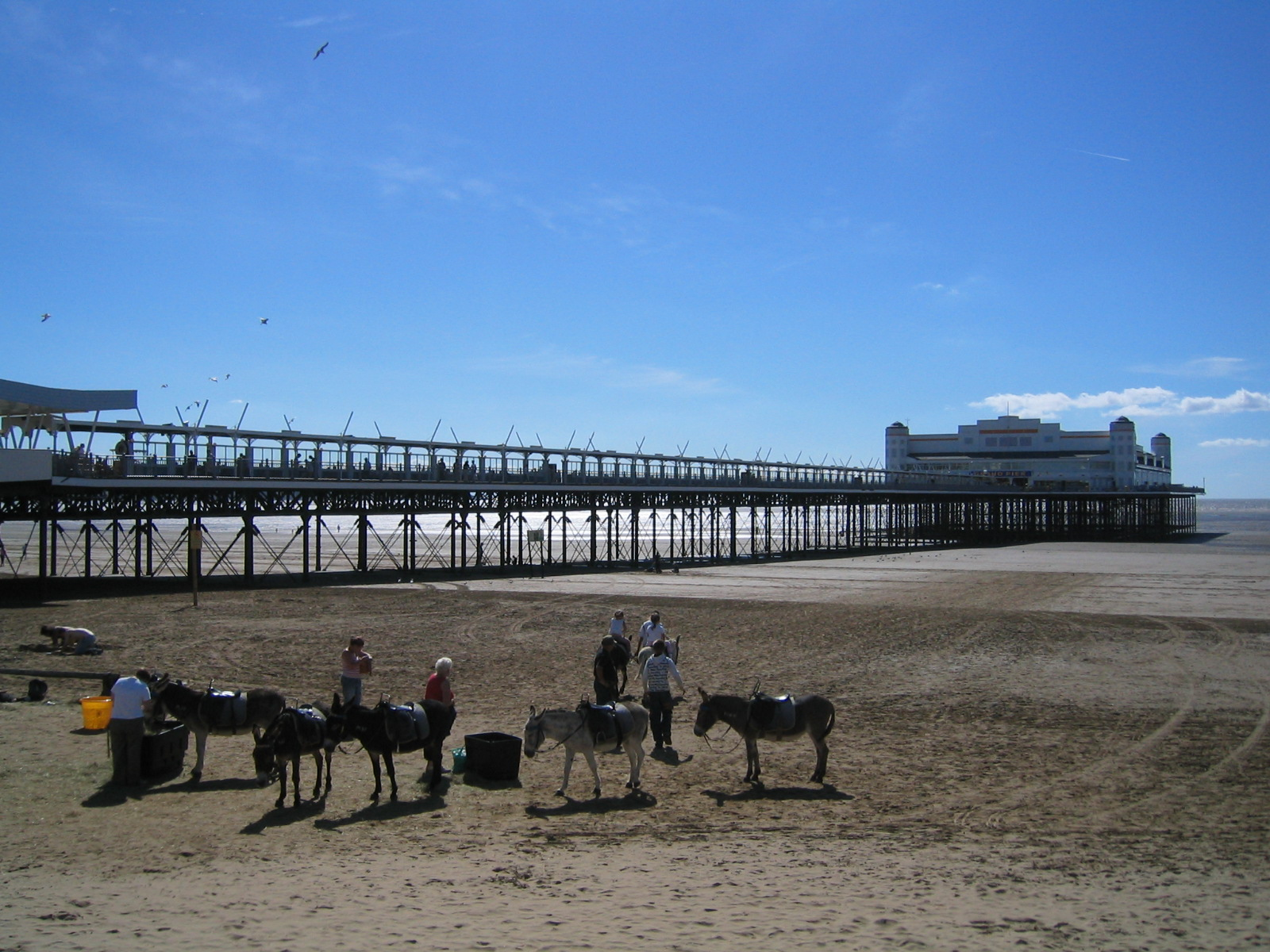
The Grand Pier and donkey rides at Weston-super-Mare

The United Kingdom saw the popularisation of seaside resorts, and nowhere was this more seen than in Blackpool. Blackpool catered for workers from across industrial Northern England, who packed its beaches and promenade. Other northern seaside towns (for example Bridlington, Cleethorpes, Morecambe, Scarborough, Skegness, and Southport) shared in the success of this new concept, especially from trade during wakes weeks. The concept spread rapidly to other British coastal towns, including several on the coast of North Wales, notably Rhyl, and Llandudno, the largest resort in Wales and known as "The Queen of the Welsh Resorts", from as early as 1864. As the 19th century progressed, British working class day-trippers travelled on organised trips such as railway excursions, or by steamer, for which long piers were erected so that the ships bringing the trade could berth.

Another area notable for its seaside resorts was (and is) the Firth of Clyde, outside Glasgow. Glaswegians would take a ferry "doon the watter" from the city, down the River Clyde, to the Firth's islands and peninsulas and beyond, such as Cowal, Bute, Arran, and Kintyre. Resorts include Rothesay, Lamlash, Whiting Bay, Dunoon, Tighnabruaich, Carrick Castle, Helensburgh, Largs, Millport and Campbeltown. In contrast to many resorts, some on the Firth of Clyde have continued to prosper as middle-class commuter towns.

Some resorts, especially those more southerly such as Hastings, Worthing, Eastbourne, Bournemouth, and Brighton were built as new towns or extended by local landowners to appeal to wealthier holidaymakers. Others came about due to their proximity to large urban areas of population, such as Southend-on-Sea, which became increasingly popular with residents of London once rail links were established to it allowing day trips from London. The sunshine and sea air were seen by Victorians as beneficial for health, and resorts such as Ventnor owed their growth to a visit being considered as treatment for chest complaints. Owing to its generally better climate, the south coast has many seaside towns, the most being in Sussex.

In the later 20th century, the popularity of the British seaside resort declined for the same reason that it first flourished: advances in transport. The greater accessibility of foreign holiday destinations, through package holidays and, more recently, European low-cost airlines, have started offering travel to seaside resorts. Despite the loyalty of returning holidaymakers, resorts such as Blackpool have struggled to compete against the hotter weather of Southern Europe and the sunbelt in the United States. Now, many symbols of the traditional British resort (holiday camps, end-of-the-pier shows and saucy postcards) are regarded by some as drab and outdated; the skies are imagined to be overcast and the beach windswept. This is not always true; for example Broadstairs in Kent has retained much of its old world charm with Punch and Judy and donkey rides and still remains popular, being only one hour from the M25. Brighton has also seen a fall in visitor numbers in recent years. The city has also experienced a rise in homelessness, especially noticeable on the city streets and in green spaces where tents have been erected.

Many people can now afford "second holidays" and short breaks, resulting in increased tourism in British seaside towns. Many seaside towns have large shopping centres which also attract people from a wide area. Day trippers still come to the coastal towns, but on a more local scale than during the 19th century.

Some English Coastal towns have a large retired population, including permanent residents and seasonal visitors in autumn. Several towns have also developed distinct identities for marketing and tourism. Southwold on the Suffolk coast is known as a quiet retirement destination, with a rural setting and an association with jazz. Weymouth, Dorset promotes itself as a gateway to the Jurassic Coast, England's only natural World Heritage Site. Newquay in Cornwall describes itself as the "surfing capital of Britain" and hosts international surfing events.

Torbay in South Devon is also known as the English Riviera. Consisting of the towns of Torquay, Paignton with its pier and Brixham, the bay has 20 beaches and coves along its 22-mile (35 km) coastline, ranging from small secluded coves to the larger promenade-style seafronts of Torquay's Torre Abbey Sands and Paignton Sands.

However, British seaside resorts have faced increasingly stiff competition from sunnier resorts overseas since the 1970s. Largely due to the falling price of air travel under the Conservative government of Margaret Thatcher (elected in 1979), the number of British families who took holidays abroad rose significantly in the 1980s. The decline of British seaside resorts was discussed in the Morrissey song "Everyday Is Like Sunday" where daily life in the resort is likened to the emptiness of streets once associated with the shop closures on Sunday.

=== United States ===
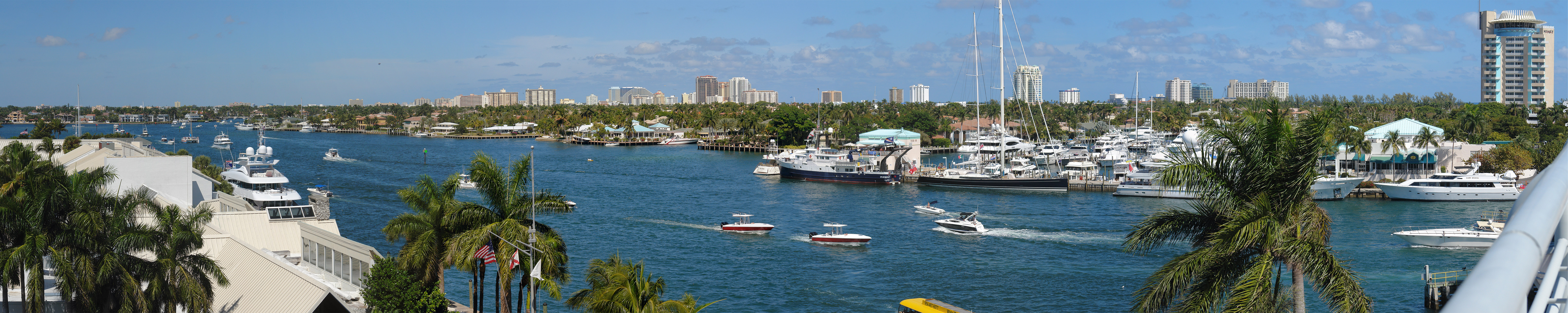
Fort Lauderdale harbor
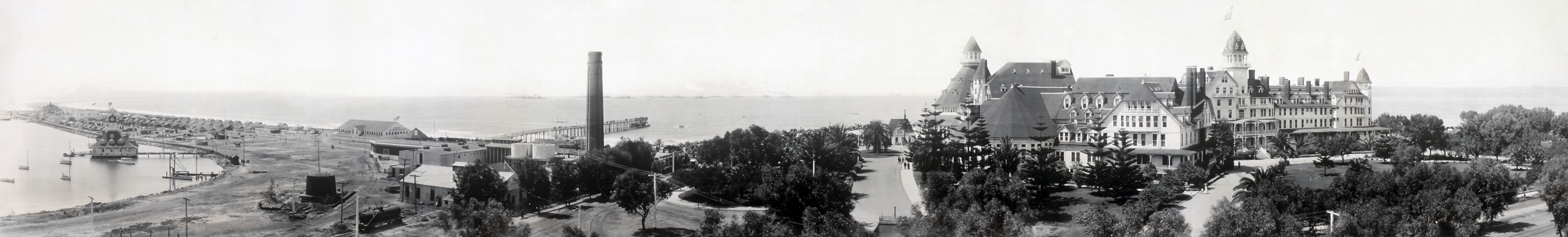
Hotel Del Coronado in Coronado, California in 1908

With 3,800 miles (6100 km) of coastline, the US mainland has hundreds of seaside resorts on three coasts, Atlantic Ocean, Gulf of Mexico, and Pacific Ocean. Unlike in many smaller countries, the seaside resorts in the US are located in various climate zones, with great differences in topography and environment. Many American seaside resorts are popular destination across the world, known for their climates, culture, and entertainment opportunities.

Seaside resorts in the United States first developed near the nation's largest industrial cities on the upper East Coast, including New York City, Philadelphia, and Boston. Cape May, New Jersey, part of the Philadelphia metropolitan area, and Provincetown, Massachusetts, part of the Boston metropolitan area were two of the nation's first seaside resorts, developed in the 19th century and catering to city workers. Cape May is often called Americas "first seaside resort". The early emergence of Cape May as a summer resort was due to easy transport by water from Philadelphia to the Atlantic Ocean. Early Cape May vacationers were carried to the town on sloops from Philadelphia, and water transport was also easy from New York, Baltimore, Washington, D.C., and points south. The resort business in Cape May began to thrive when regular steamboat traffic on the Delaware River began after the War of 1812. Early visitors to Cape May included Henry Clay in 1847, and Abraham Lincoln in 1849. Today, the Cape May Historic District is one of the largest and well preserved examples of Victorian architecture in the United States.

On the southern Atlantic coast, Henry Flagler had the idea to make St. Augustine, Florida a winter resort. He built several rail lines south, and combined them with existing lines to create the Florida East Coast Railway in 1885. He built a railroad bridge over the St. Johns River in 1888, opening up the Atlantic coast of Florida to development. In 1887 Flagler began construction of two large ornate hotels in St. Augustine, the 540-room Ponce de Leon Hotel and the Hotel Alcazar, and bought the Casa Monica Hotel the next year.

In Miami, Florida, the community of Cocoanut (now Coconut) Grove began development as a resort town in the 1880s with the building of the Bayview House (aka Peacock Inn) which closed in 1902. Visitors to the greater Miami area then flocked to Camp Biscayne (in Coconut Grove), the Royal Palm Hotel in Downtown Miami, and other resort hotels in Miami, as well as in smaller numbers to the Florida Keys. In 1894, the lavish Royal Poinciana Hotel opened in Palm Beach, Florida, with rave reviews from wealthy New York tourists who picked oranges in January to their delight. On the Gulf of Mexico, the City of Galveston was emerging as a booming city, and in 1882, architect Nicholas J. Clayton designed the Beach Hotel. By 1888, Galveston, TX was a wealthy city and booming seaside playground for wealthy New Orleans businessmen.

On the Pacific coast in California, in April 1886, Babcock and Story created the Coronado Beach Company, which sought to develop Coronado as a seaside resort. In the mid-1880s, the San Diego region was in the midst of one of its first real estate booms. The Hotel del Coronado was built in March 1887, with Babcock's visions for the hotel built around a courtyard of tropical trees, shrubs and flowers, with a dining wing to give full value to the view of the ocean, bay and city. By 1915, more hotels were built along the Los Angeles coastline to serve the wealthy tourists and Hollywood film makers. In May 1926, brothers E.A. "Jack" Harter and T.D. "Til" Harter built the Hotel Casa del Mar in Santa Monica, at a cost of $2 million, creating one of the most successful beach clubs in Southern California, popular with socialites and Hollywood celebrities.

In the 1920s, Carl Fisher was the main promoter of Miami Beach, and helped to develop the city as a seaside resort. To accommodate the wealthy tourists, several grand hotels were built, among them the Flamingo Hotel. In 1926, the massive The Breakers hotel in Palm Beach had been rebuilt, and there was a large northern tourist industry in coastal southern Florida. By the 1950s with increasing auto travel, more seaside resorts grew along the Atlantic and Pacific coasts, while small, declining industrial ports were being rebuilt. In 1954, the Fontainebleau Miami Beach, and was considered, (at that time) the most lavish seaside hotel in the world.

In the modern era, hundreds of seaside resorts now string the Gulf, Atlantic, and Pacific coasts of the United States. Many Americans move with the seasons when they visit seaside resorts, vacationing in northern seaside areas in the warm season (April through October), and then moving to southern areas in the cold season (November through March). Many seaside resorts in Florida and California however, see travelers all year.

Some examples of well-known and sought-after American coastal resort towns are:

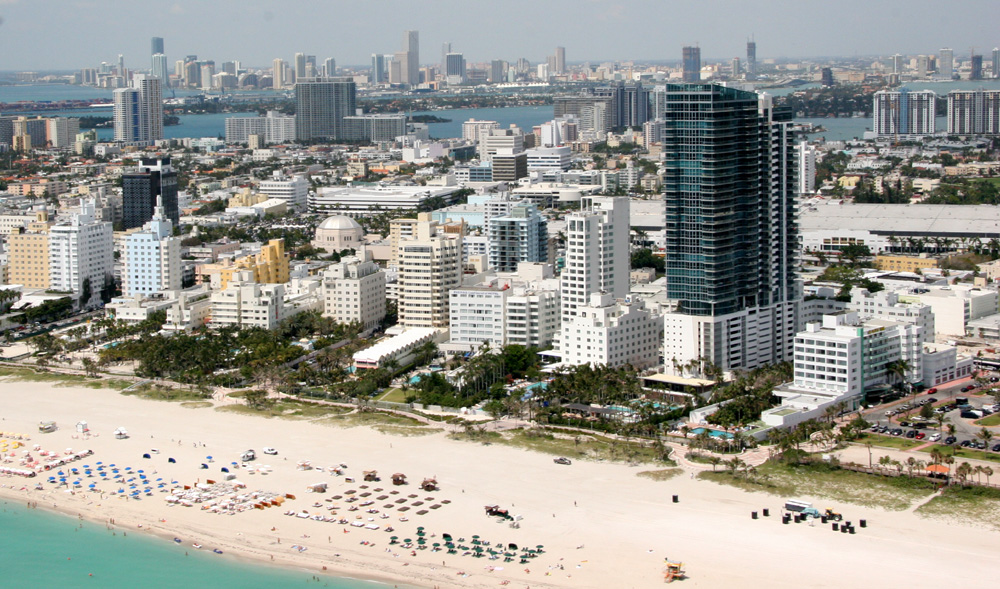
Miami Beach, Florida

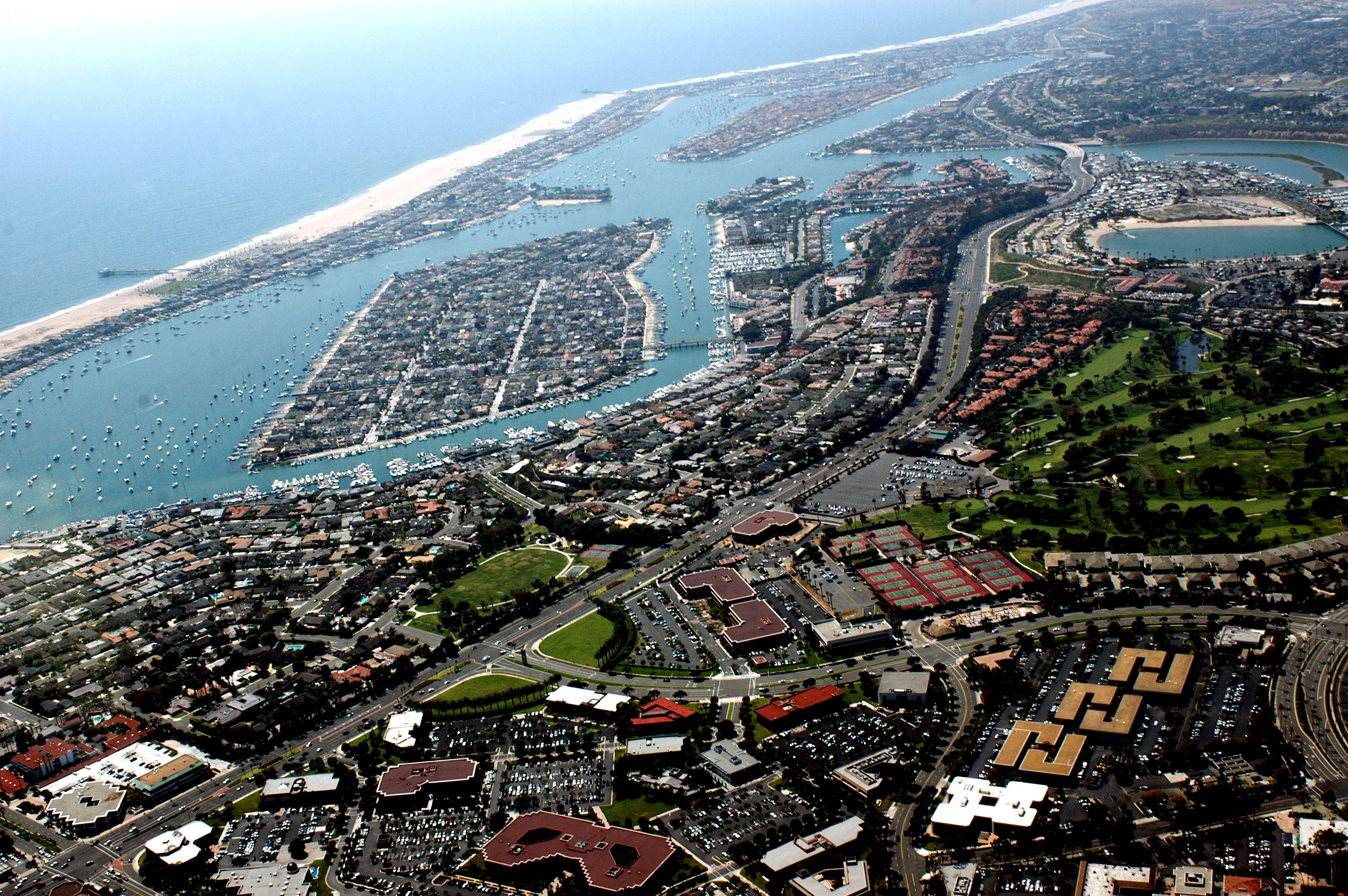
Newport Beach, California

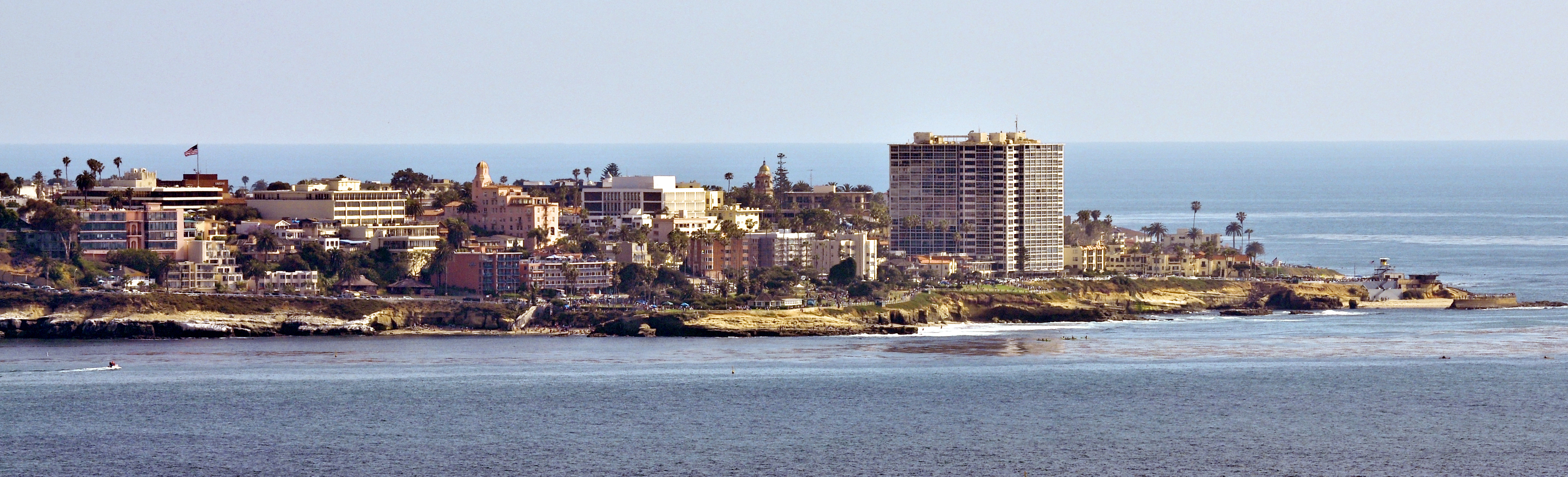
La Jolla, California

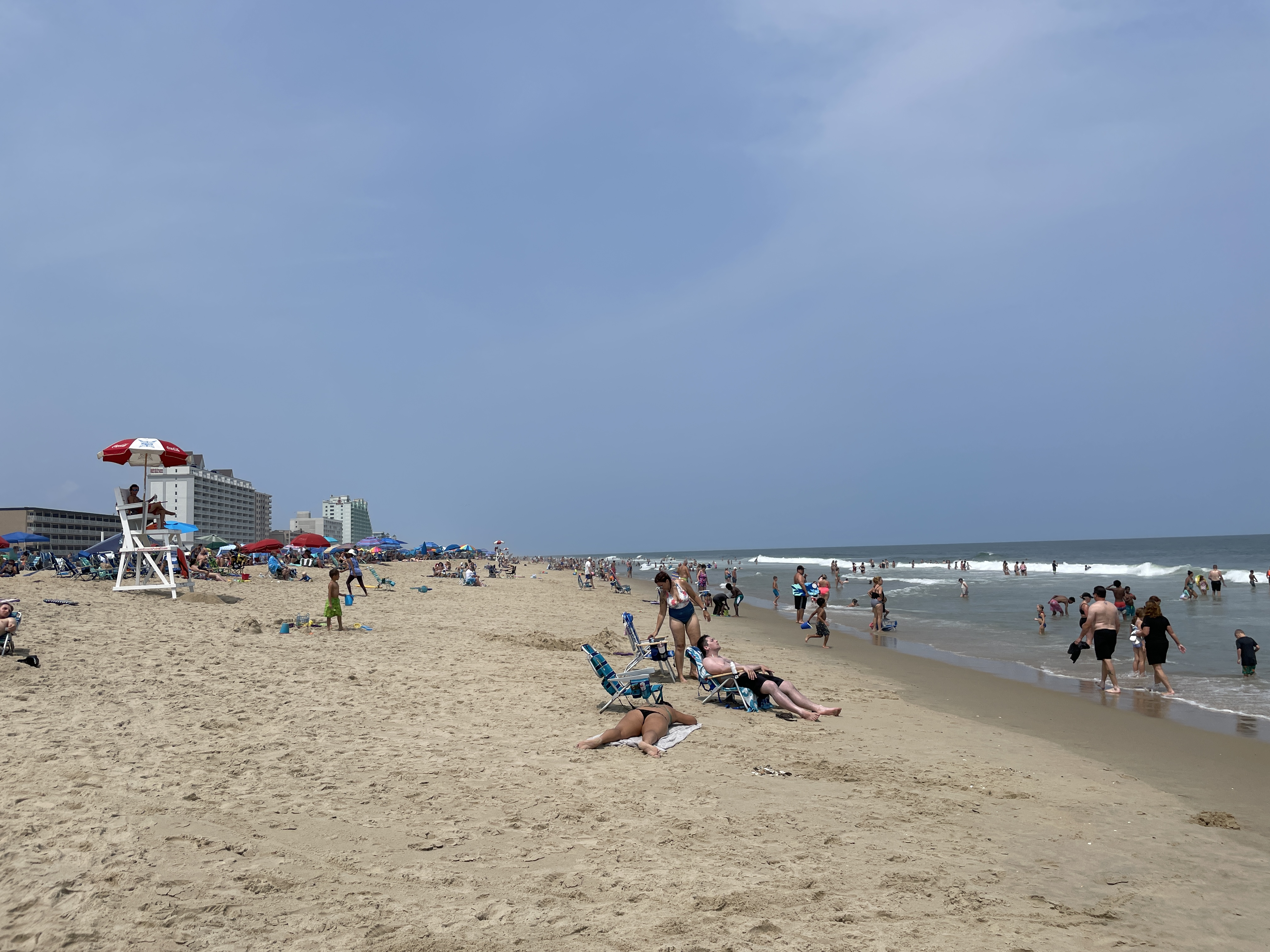
Ocean City, Maryland

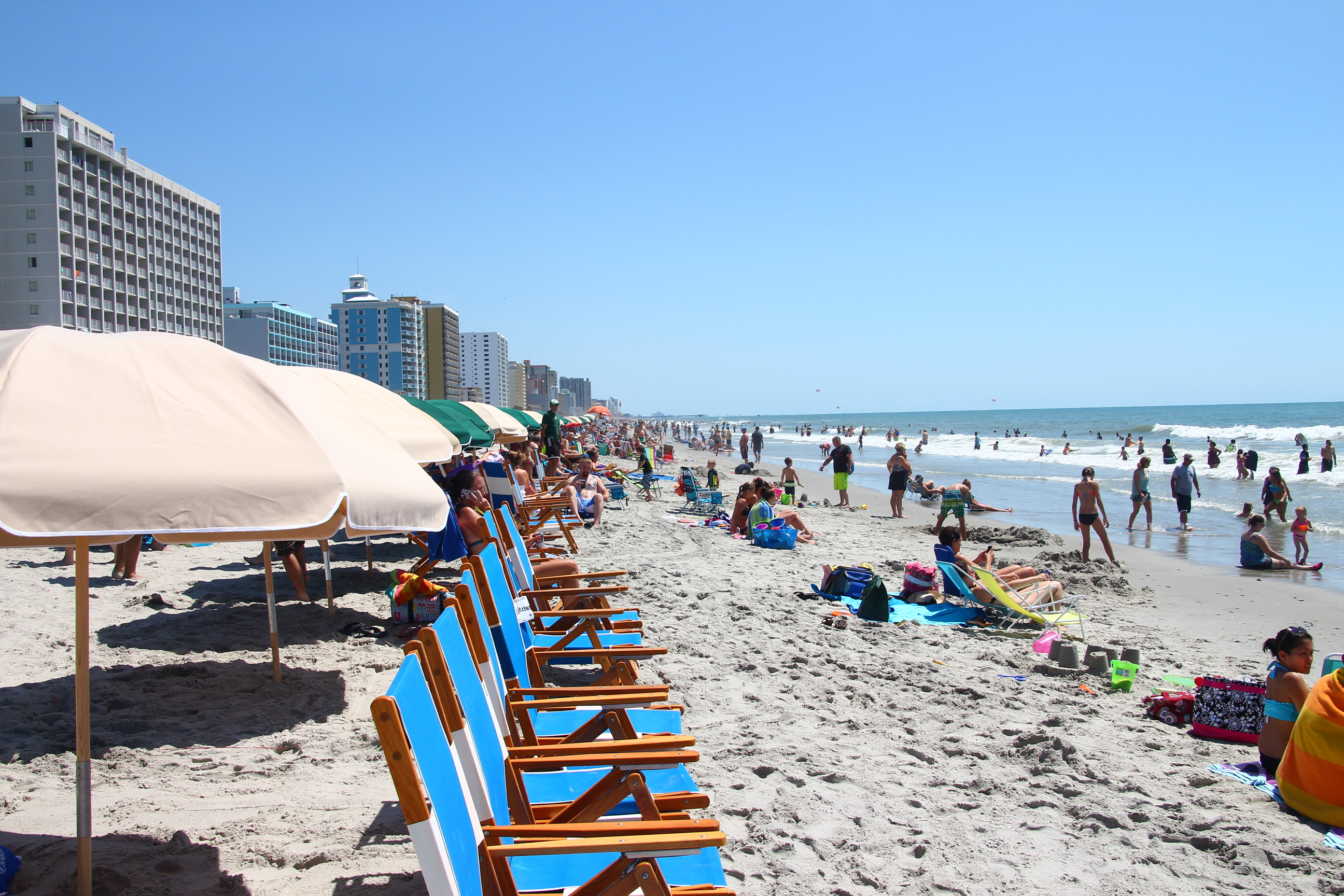
Myrtle Beach, South Carolina

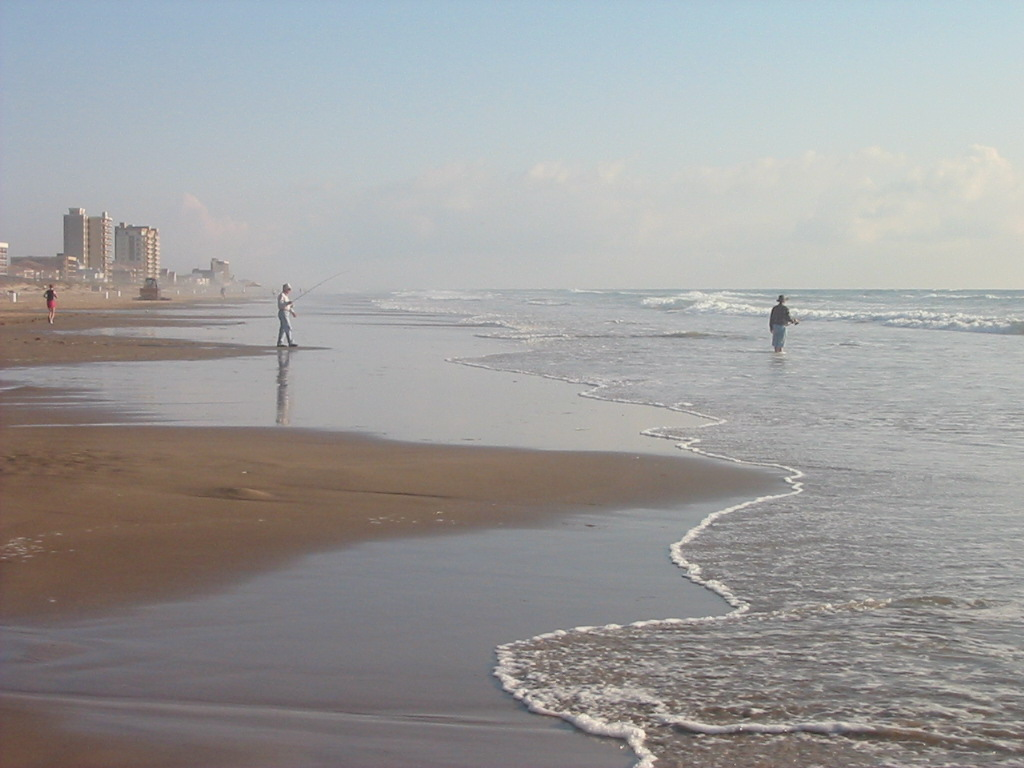
South Padre Island, Texas

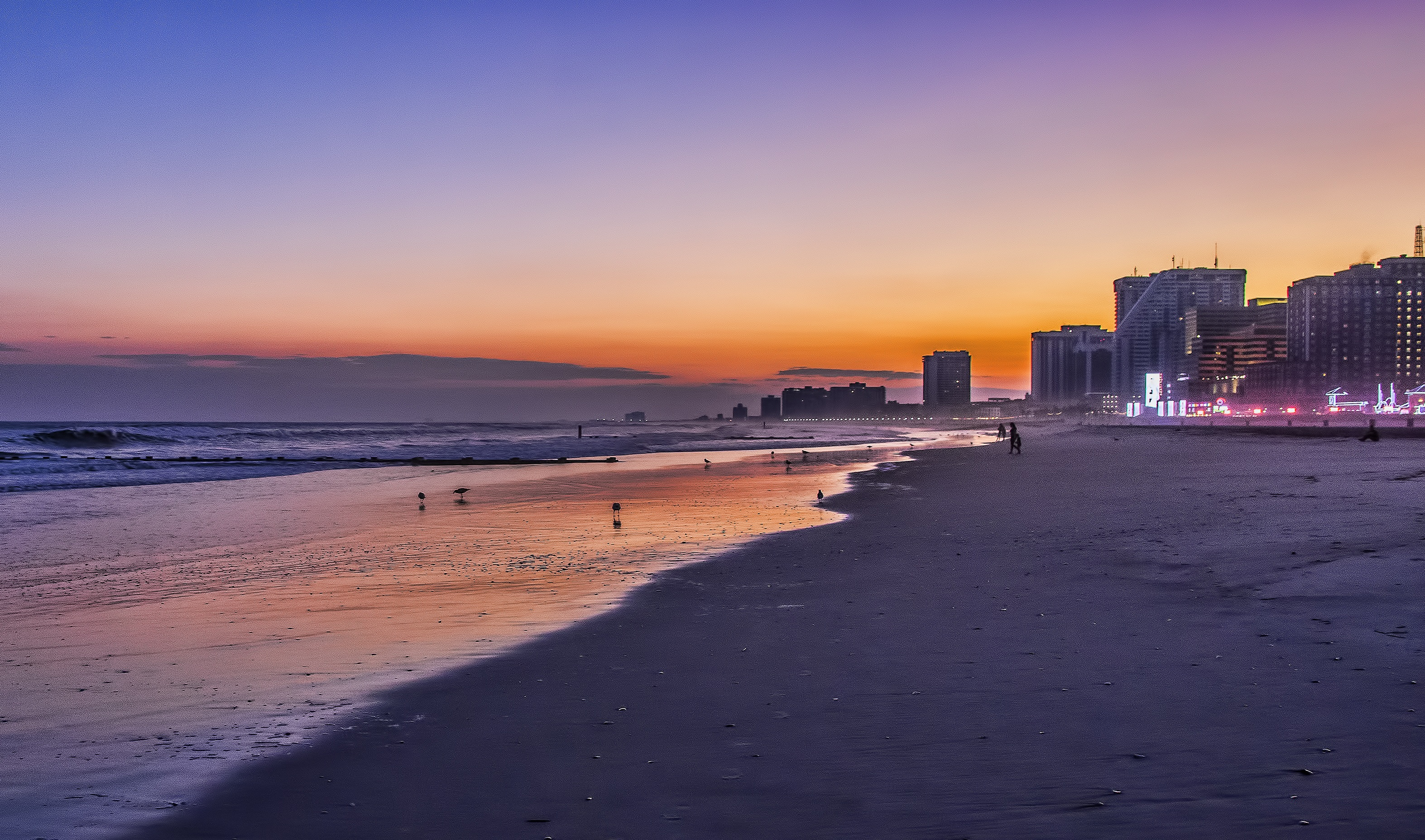
A sunset on the beach at Atlantic City, New Jersey, famous for the world's first boardwalk

- Gulf Shores, Alabama
- Orange Beach, Alabama
- Dauphin Island, Alabama
- Carlsbad, California
- Corona Del Mar, California
- Coronado, California
- Dana Point, California
- Laguna Beach, California
- Los Angeles, California (Venice district)
- Malibu, California
- Montecito, California
- Newport Beach, California
- Pebble Beach, California
- San Diego, California (La Jolla, Pacific Beach, Mission Beach and Ocean Beach neighborhoods)
- Santa Monica, California
- Mystic, Connecticut
- Bethany Beach, Delaware
- Rehoboth Beach, Delaware
- Clearwater, Florida
- Daytona Beach, Florida
- Fort Lauderdale, Florida
- Key West, Florida
- Marco Island, Florida
- Miami Beach, Florida
- Palm Beach, Florida
- Panama City, Florida
- Panama City Beach, Florida
- Pensacola Beach, Florida
- St. Augustine, Florida
- Saint Petersburg, Florida
- Siesta Key, Florida
- Tampa, Florida
- Sea Island, Georgia
- Tybee Island, Georgia
- Lahaina, Maui, Hawaii
- Kennebunkport, Maine
- Old Orchard Beach, Maine
- Ocean City, Maryland
- Hull, Massachusetts
- Martha's Vineyard, Massachusetts
- Nantucket, Massachusetts
- Provincetown, Massachusetts
- Allenhurst, New Jersey
- Asbury Park, New Jersey
- Atlantic City, New Jersey
- Cape May, New Jersey
- Deal, New Jersey
- Elberon, New Jersey
- Keansburg, New Jersey
- Loch Arbour, New Jersey
- Long Beach Island, New Jersey
- Long Branch, New Jersey
- Ocean City, New Jersey
- Point Pleasant, New Jersey
- Sea Isle City, New Jersey
- Seaside Heights, New Jersey
- Wildwood, New Jersey
- Coney Island, New York
- Fire Island, New York
- The Hamptons, New York
- Long Beach, New York
- The Rockaways, New York
- Bald Head Island, North Carolina
- Figure Eight Island, North Carolina
- Nags Head, North Carolina
- Oak Island, North Carolina
- Ocean Isle Beach, North Carolina
- Wrightsville Beach, North Carolina
- Seaside, Oregon
- Newport, Rhode Island
- Folly Beach, South Carolina
- Hilton Head, South Carolina
- Isle of Palms, South Carolina
- Myrtle Beach, South Carolina
- Galveston, Texas
- South Padre Island, Texas
- Virginia Beach, Virginia

=== Vietnam ===
- Hạ Long
- Chân Mây – Lăng Cô, Huế
- Đà Nẵng
- Hội An
- Quy Nhơn
- Tuy Hòa
- Nha Trang
- Cam Ranh
- Phan Rang
- Phan Thiết
- Mũi Né
- Vũng Tàu
- Hồ Tràm
- Phú Quốc

== See also ==
- List of beaches
- Ski resort
- Tourism
