= Bushman's River Mouth =

Bushman's River Mouth Boesmansriviermond
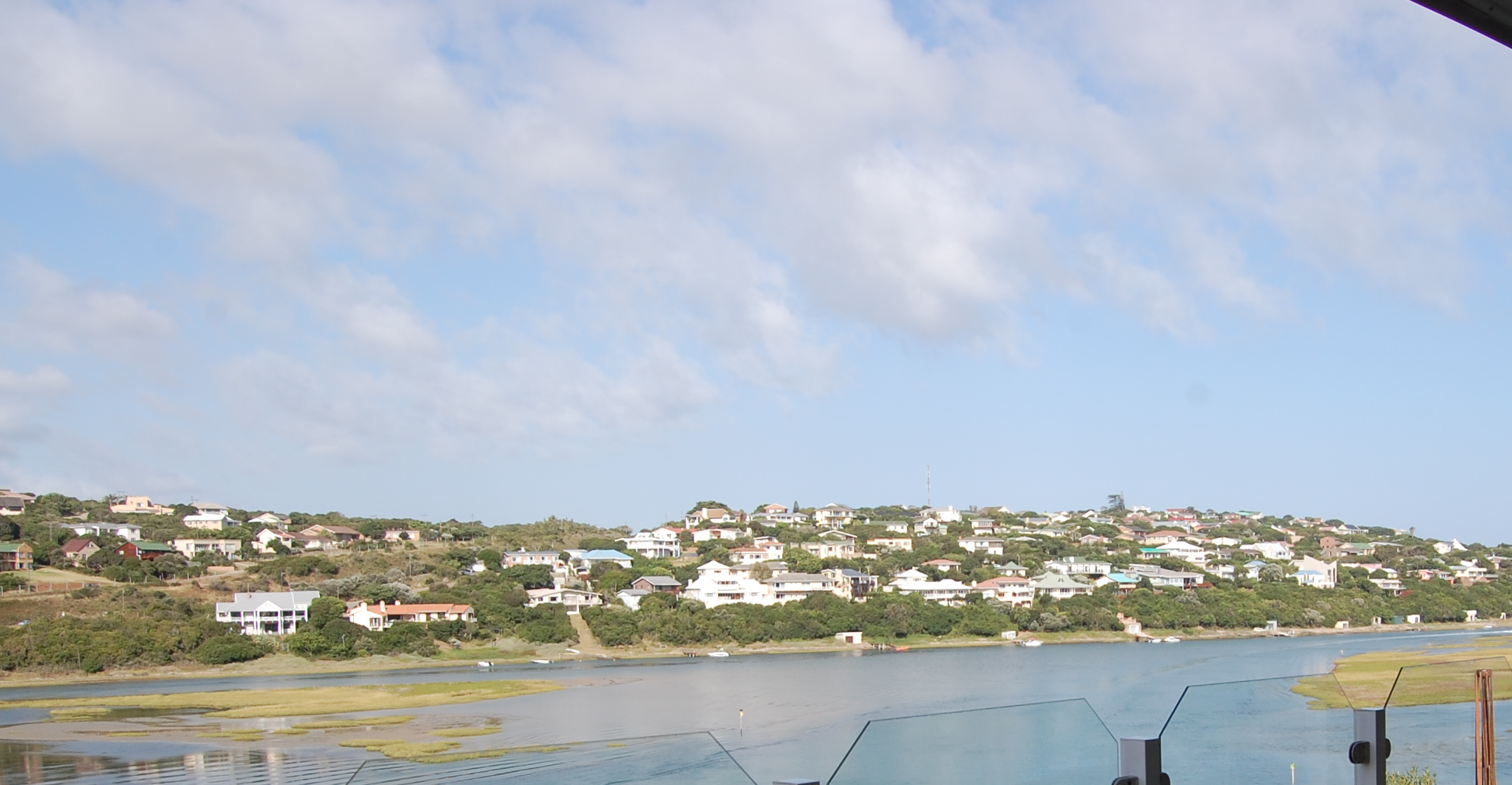
- Bushman's River Mouth

- Location within Eastern Cape Location within South Africa
- Coordinates: 33.7°S 26.666°E
- Country: South Africa
- Province: Eastern Cape
- District: Sarah Baartman
- Municipality: Ndlambe

Area
  - Total: 15.82 km^{2} (6.11 sq mi)

Population (2011)
  - Total: 6,147
  - Density: 388.6/km^{2} (1,006/sq mi)

Racial makeup (2011)
  - Black African: 77.5%
  - Coloured: 13.6%
  - Indian/Asian: 0.2%
  - White: 8.3%
  - Other: 0.5%

First languages (2011)
  - Xhosa: 74.1%
  - Afrikaans: 16.9%
  - English: 6.6%
  - Other: 2.3%
- Time zone: UTC+2 (SAST)
- Postal code (street): 6190
- PO box: 6190

Bushman's River Mouth (Afrikaans Boesmansriviermond) is a town in Ndlambe Local Municipality in the Eastern Cape province of South Africa.

The village is 25 km from Port Alfred, on the west bank of the Bushman's River, just across the river from Kenton-on-Sea.

== Background ==
A well-known holiday resort, it is the site of many shipwrecks, the best-known of them being the Volo, a Norwegian barque wrecked near the river mouth in 1896.

The town was established in 1897 by farmers from nearby towns (Paterson, Cookhouse, Somerset East and Cradock) when they were granted permission to camp along the banks of the Bushman's River during the Christmas holiday season. Land leases during the early 1900s led to private land ownership, and modern development, though electricity and running water only became available in the 1980s.

The Dias Cross Memorial at nearby Kwaaihoek is a provincial heritage site erected to mark the location of the padrão, or stone pillar, planted in 1488 by Portuguese sailors led by Bartolomeu Dias.

Boesmansriviermond has an active ratepayers association known as BRRAG (Bushman's River Ratepayers' Organisation).
