= Algoa Bay Yacht Club =

South African yacht club

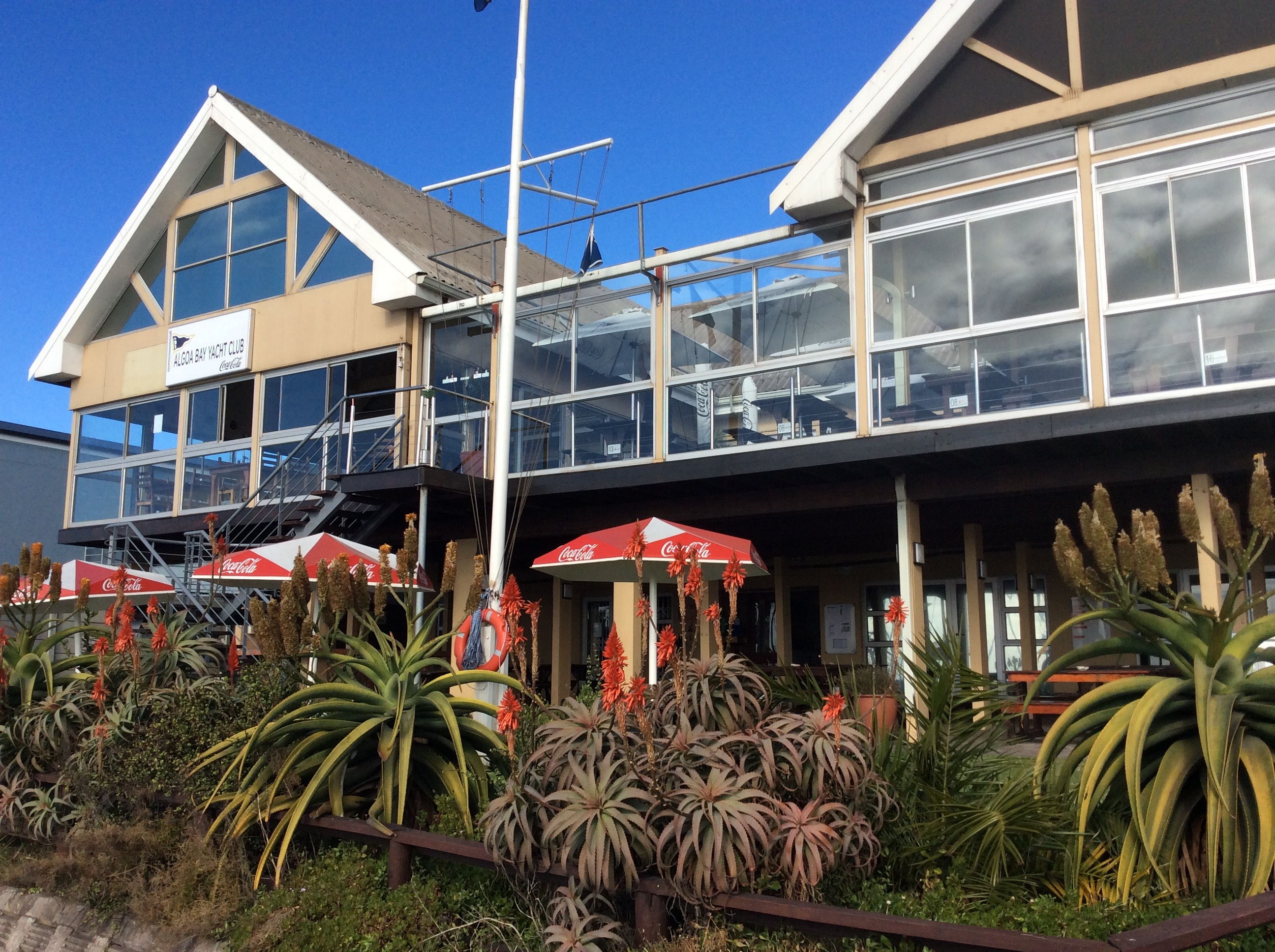
- Photograph of Algoa Bay Yacht Club, taken 2016
- Abbreviation: ABYC
- Formation: 1959
- Legal status: Active
- Purpose: Fostering sailing, educator and network for recreational boating, and competitive sailors, coaches, volunteers and events
- Location: Dom Pedro Jetty, Port Elizabeth Harbour, Port Elizabeth, 6000
- Official language: English
- Commodore: Alan Straton
- Affiliations: South African Sailing, World Sailing, South African Sports Confederation and Olympic Committee

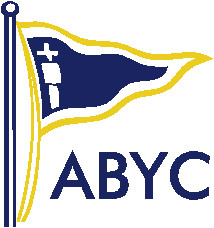
The burgee of the Algoa Bay Yacht Club, Port Elizabeth, Nelson Mandela Bay, South Africa

The Algoa Bay Yacht Club (ABYC) is a yacht club in Port Elizabeth, Eastern Cape, South Africa.

== History ==
The Algoa Bay Yacht Club was established on 14 September 1959 and currently has around 245 members. The ABYC Founder Members were Paddy Goodall, Scotty Pearson, Mike Morgan, Harold Kohler, Charles Allen, Graham Packer, Jerry Cullum, and Stompie Macdonald. ABYC incorporates the Zwartkops Yacht Club, which was previously named the Beaconsfield Yacht Club and established in 1884 on the Zwartkops River.

The cross on the ABYC pennant commemorates the wooden cross erected in Algoa Bay by the first European sailor to discover it, Bartolomeu Dias, on 12 March 1488. The Dias Cross Memorial now commemorates this event.

== Activities ==
=== Regattas ===
ABYC hosts local, regional, national, and international sailing regattas.

==== Hosted regattas ====
- 1958: The Lipton Cup Regatta was hosted by Algoa Bay Yacht Club. After winning the Lipton Cup in Cape Town in 1957 in Trickson II, the skipper Harold Kohler (sailing under the burgee of Redhouse Yacht Club) nominated Algoa Bay as the defense's sailing area. Wilf Hancock won the 1958 Lipton Cup regatta from Durban.
- 1962: The Lipton Cup fleet returned to Algoa Bay as a result of the nomination of ABYC by Noel Horsfield, the winner of the 1961 Lipton Cup; a fleet of 30 sqm competed for the Lipton Cup, and for the first time, ABYC had entry – Paddy Goodall's "Sunmaid." Harold Kohler was in again with "Trickson II" under the Redhouse burgee while Graham Packer represented Zwartkops. None of these three local entries managed to win the event, and the competition was not held in Algoa Bay waters again until 1998.
- 1972: The RCOD and Soling classes held their National Championships on the bay, and ABYC hosted the event.
- 1975: ABYC's annual regatta, "Algoa Bay Week," was established - a regatta held every year since then. The first one was prefaced by a boat show held at the swimming bath at St. George's Park. A small yacht was launched into the swimming bath for public inspection and various displays of yachting equipment were laid out. The NSRI and the South African Air Force performed a rescue operation. The first major sponsor was Kronenbrau, then Opel, then Kwikot, then Continental from 1995 to 2000, then GMSA and Nelson Mandela Bay Municipality from 2002 to 2005.
- 1998: The Lipton Cup was held in Algoa Bay in 1998.
- 1998: Dart Nationals.
- 1999: ABYC hosted the J22 World Championships in 1999.
- 2002: Optimist Selections.
- 2003: The Optimist African Continental Championships were held at ABYC in 2003.
- 2005: Optimist Selections.
- 2005: Finn Nationals.
- 2006: Hobie 16 World Championships.
- 2007: The Mirror World Championships were hosted by ABYC in January 2007 and resulted in a number of firsts: the first duo to win the pre-worlds and World Championships and the first all-female skipper and crew to win the World Championships.
- 2012: The Hobie 16 Nationals took place in Algoa Bay in 2012, 2013, 2014.
- 2015: The Vasco Da Gama Ocean Race from Durban to Port Elizabeth finished at ABYC in 2015, 2016, 2017.
- 2015: The 60th SAP 5O5 World Championships were hosted by ABYC from 23 March to 3 April 2015.

==== Annual regattas ====
1. ABYC hosts a number of local short and medium distances races and short-course regattas throughout the sailing season.
2. Algoa Bay Sailing Week is the annual premier provincial yacht regatta.
3. The ABYC Inter-club Dinghy Regatta is held at either North End Lake or off-shore.
4. A number of radio-controlled yacht regattas are held annually.

=== Community and development ===
- The first sail training school for locals with an emphasis on youth was established in 1998.
- In 2001, with the demise of the Zwartkops Yacht Club, ABYC expanded their facilities and installed a slipway to accommodate the dinghy sailing population.
- In 2003, a need was seen to embark on sail training with an emphasis on previously disadvantaged youth and the ABYC Sailing School was established. A 4-year partnership with LoveLife South Africa was established in 2003 which resulted in close on One Thousand school pupils taking part in an eight-week sail training program under the tutelage of LoveLife coaches.
- ABYC members give support to other watersport events in Algoa Bay such as the annual Bell Buoy Challenge.
- ABYC operates a sailing school across the sailing season of September to May. ABYC owns a fleet of dinghies: O-9ers, Optimists, Lasers, a Sprog, and a Regatta. Dinghy sailors are competing in local, provincial, national, and international events on Mirrors, Hobie-Cats, RS Teras, Lasers, and 420s.
- ABYC members give support to other watersport events or organizations in Algoa Bay, such as Redhouse Yacht Club and arrange provincial or national regattas.

== Notable ABYC sailors ==
- Bertie Reed – Springbok sailor.
- Jimmy Swinnerton on Flame.
- John Tudehope, Sean Wiseman, Alan Straton – Vasco Da Gama Ocean Race 2014, 2015 on Wallbanger a Simonis 35.
- Tony and Sigi Bailes, Mark Dawson – Vasco Da Gama Ocean Race 2014, 2015 on Nemesis a Fast 42.
- Tammy Bailes and Luke Weddell – 2016 RS Tera World Championships.
