= Robert Jacob Gordon =

Dutch army officer, explorer and naturalist (1743–1795)

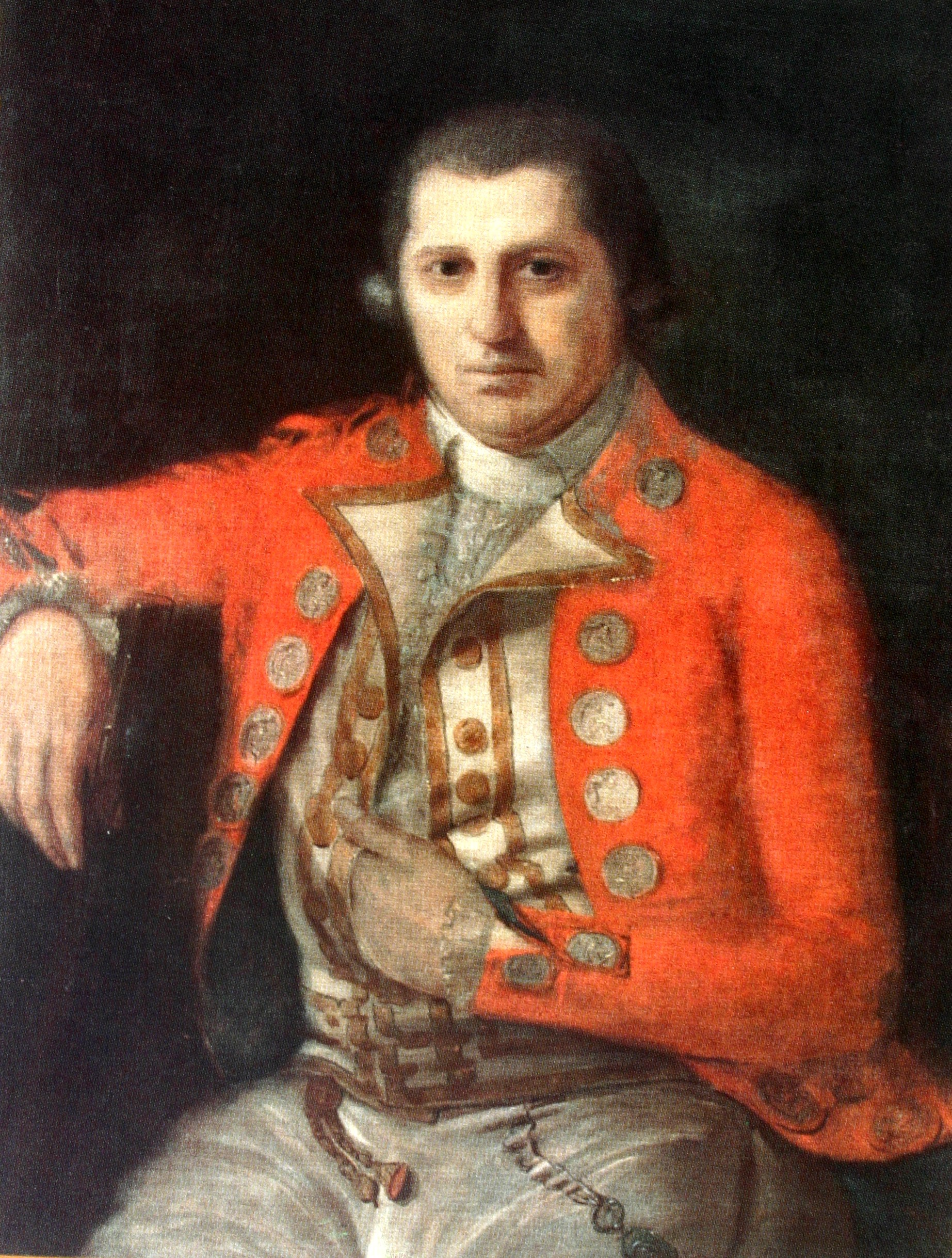
- 1780 portrait
- Born: 29 September 1743; Doesburg, Gelderland
- Died: 25 October 1795 (aged 52); Cape Town, Dutch Cape Colony
- Occupations: Military officer, explorer and naturalist

Colonel Robert Jacob Gordon (29 September 1743 – 25 October 1795) was a Dutch army officer, explorer and naturalist.

== Early life ==
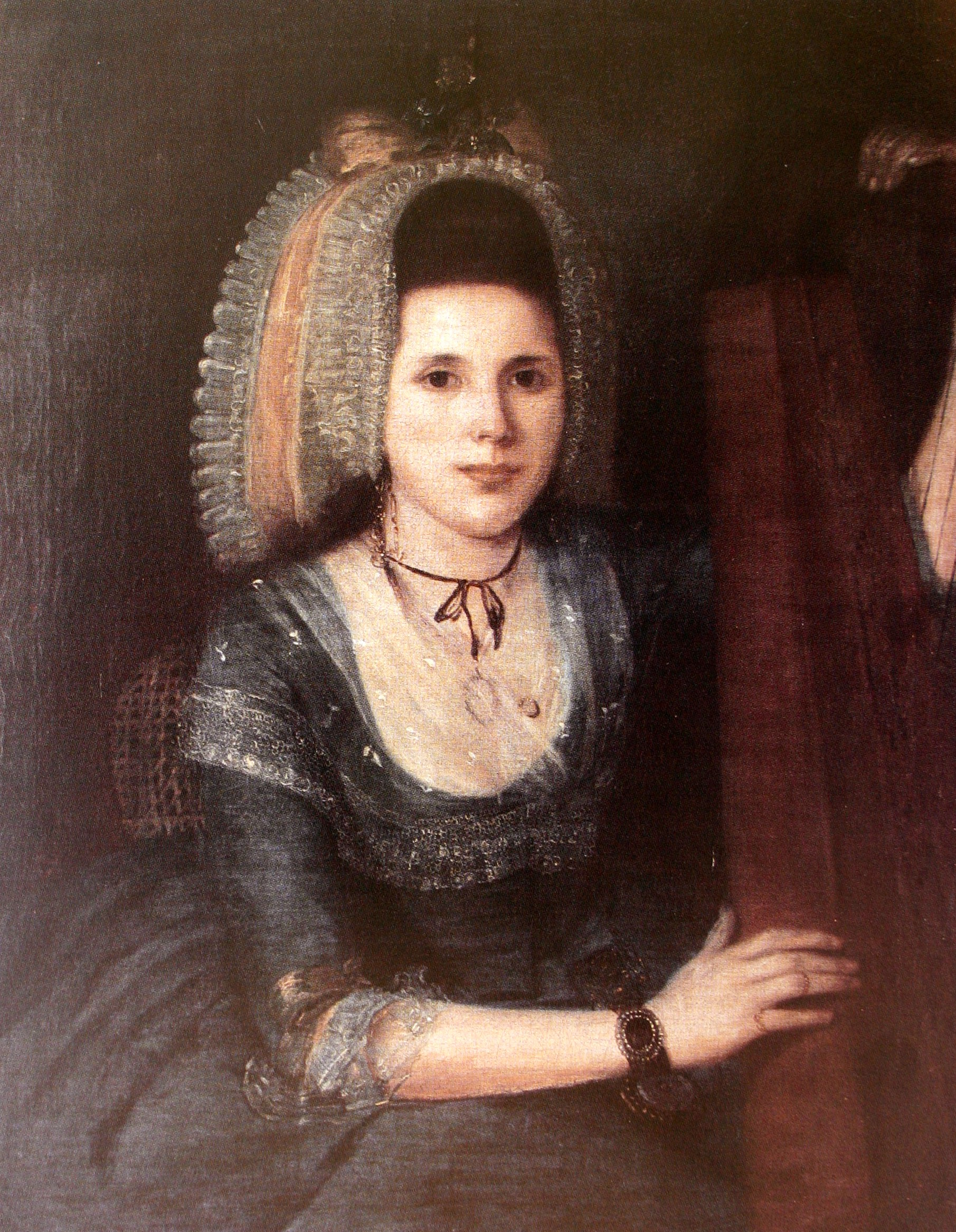
1780 portrait of Gordon's wife Susanna Nicolet

Robert Jacob Gordon was born in Doesburg, Gelderland on 29 September 1743. He was the son of Major-General Jacob Gordon, a Scottish officer in the Dutch States Army's Scots Brigade and his Dutch wife Johanna Maria Heijdenrijck. Gordon joined a light dragoons unit of the Dutch army as a military cadet in 1753 before enrolling in the University of Harderwijk six years later, studying humanities. After graduating he resumed his service with the Dutch army, serving in the Scots Brigade before joining the military of the Dutch East India Company (VOC).

In VOC service, Gordon eventually rose to the rank of colonel and was posted to the Dutch Cape Colony, which he commanded the colony's garrison and lived in a manor house known as Schoonder Sight. In the Cape Colony, he went on several scientific expeditions, more than any other 18th-century European in Southern Africa. Of the six expeditions Gordon undertook, only four between 1777 and 1786 were covered by journals discovered in 1964. He was responsible for naming the Orange River, introducing Merino sheep to the Cape Colony and discovering the remains of Bartolomeu Dias's padrão at Kwaaihoek in 1786. In addition to French, Dutch and English, he spoke the indigenous Khoisan and Xhosa languages.

== Visits to Southern Africa ==
In 1772, Gordon visited the Cape Colony and met Carl Peter Thunberg and Francis Masson. Together, the trio undertook a trip on foot exploring the mountains between Cape Town and False Bay. Besides his excursion with Thunberg and Masson, he undertook one long journey during this period at the Cape, but there is no known record of his route. Gordon returned to the Cape in 1777, now at the rank of captain. He set out on a second trip from 6 October 1777 to 8 March 1778 together with botanist William Paterson, who soon turned back due to illness, and artist Johannes Schumacher. On the trip, Gordon went from Cape Town to Swellendam, and then via Plattekloof to Beervlei and on to present-day Aberdeen. He continued across the Sneeuwberg to a point slightly west of Colesberg. He then roughly retraced his outbound route as far as the Sneeuwberg, the heading south-east to Cookhouse, from where he made various forays to meet Xhosa chiefs.

One of Gordon's goals on this trip was reaching the Groote River, doing so by going north up the Great Fish, Tarka and Vlekpoort rivers to the confluence of the Groote River with the Caledon. Schumacher accompanied Gordon on all his journeys, producing a fine record of their travels and causing present-day confusion as to which sketches are his and which Gordon's. Gordon was a diligent recorder of data such as altitude, compass headings and hours travelled and other information which he would later incorporate in a great map he planned.

Paterson recorded that one of his aims on this trip was to meet with Xhosa chiefs near present-day Somerset East. For most of his journey he followed a well-travelled route, sometimes joined by others going the same way. His equipment was carried by a single wagon, while he was on horseback, ranging across the veld, observing, recording and occasionally hunting. A third trip lasting from September to October 1778, was made in the company of Governor Joachim van Plettenberg to the north-eastern frontiers of the Cape Colony.

== Later life and death ==
In 1795, French forces overran the Dutch Republic, which was transformed into the client Batavian Republic. William V, Prince of Orange fled to England, where he issued the Kew Letters urging Dutch colonial officials to cooperate with British forces sent to occupy their colonies. In June 1795, a British expeditionary force landed in the Cape Colony and after a few skirmishes captured the colony from the Dutch. The British informed Gordon of the Kew Letters, resulted in him showing little resistance to the invasion. Facing accusations of treason from his troops, and having become an outcast and a target of derision and violence among the Dutch community in the Cape Colony, Gordon committed suicide on 25 October at his manor house, Schoonder Sigt. However, a historical article about the suicide and the circumstances argues that Gordon may have had health problems and a troubling disease, which may have prompted his suicide.
