= Bartolomeu Dias Museum Complex =

Museum in Mossel Bay, South Africa

The Bartolomeu Dias Museum Complex
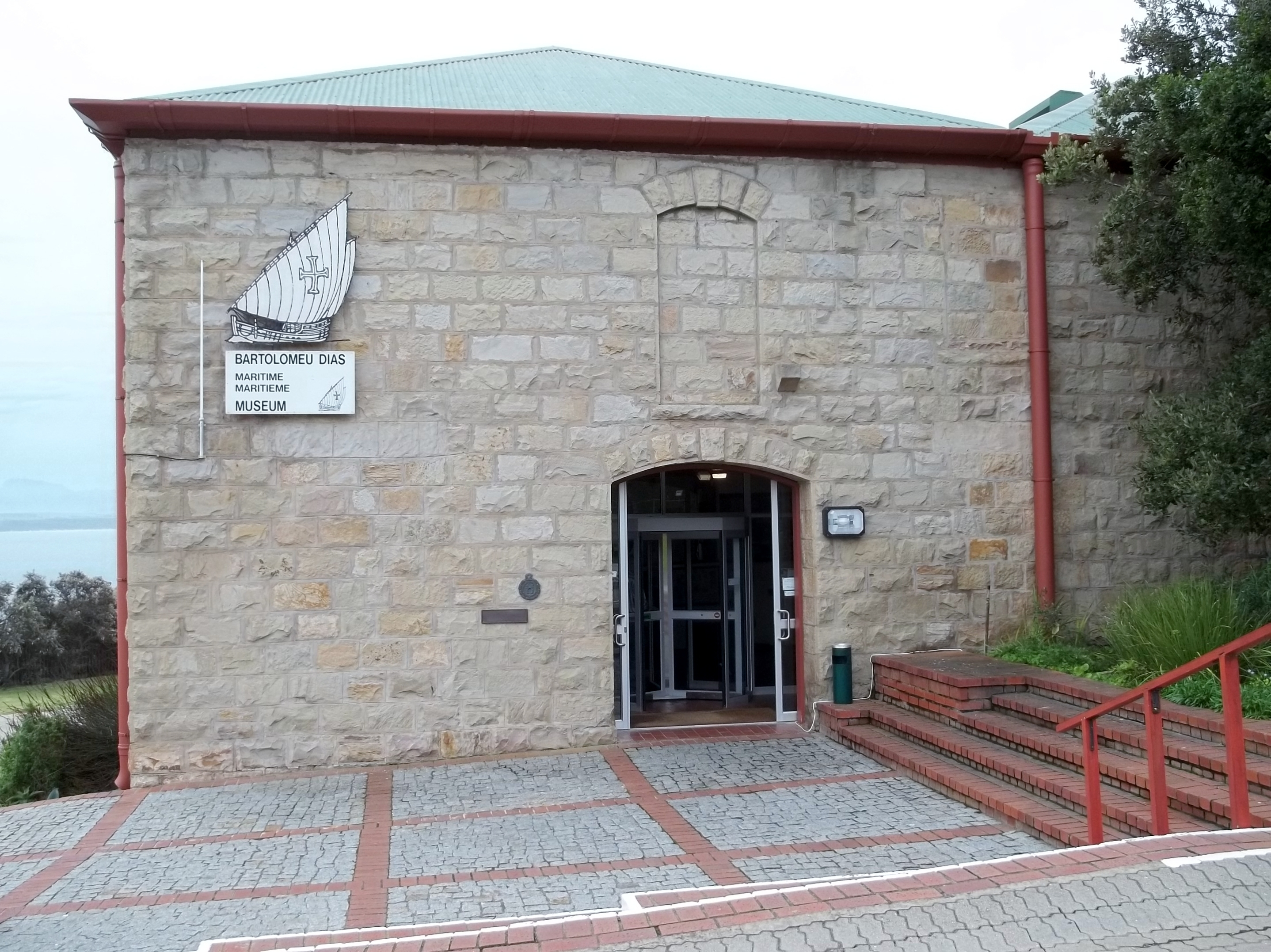
- The Bartolomeu Dias Maritime Museum.
- Established: 1989
- Location: Mossel Bay (Garden Route District Municipality)
- Coordinates: 34°10′49.42″S 22°8′32.48″E
- Type: Maritime and natural history
- Curator: Mbulelo Mrubata
- Website: www.diasmuseum.co.za

The Bartolomeu Dias Museum Complex (also spelled "Bartholomeu") is the second biggest provincial museum affiliated to the Western Cape Department of Cultural Affairs and Sport in South Africa. It is located at Mossel Bay.

== Overview ==
The Bartolomeu Dias Museum is a multi-disciplinary government institution which is mandated to preserve and conserve the local cultural and natural heritage resources for education and enjoyment of both local and foreign visitors. It is also required to contribute to the economic growth of the area by attracting visitors from various parts of the world who end up spending their money in the local businesses. Since its inception the Dias Museum has been a cornerstone of the tourism industry in Mossel Bay. Many people who travel via Garden Route from Cape Town to Port Elizabeth and vice versa come to Mossel Bay to see the museum. Museum facilities are used by various local organisations and individuals for cultural events, meetings, workshops and conferences. Bartolomeu Dias landing in Mossel Bay in 1488. The whole museum site is a provincial heritage site.

The museum's scope is multidisciplinary in nature as it covers both cultural and natural history of Mossel Bay. The site's botanical garden is vegetated by indigenous plants and trees which were used as herbs by the early inhabitants of the area. In the site there is a grave of the Malay slave which is presently used as a place of worship by the local Muslim community. The museum is called a "complex" because it consists of three buildings, namely the Maritime Museum, Shell Museum, and the Granary. Within the museum site there are also two 19th-century edifices called Munro cottages.

== History ==
This museum is a culmination of the Mossel Bay Museum which was established by the Board of Trustees on 23 August 1960. It was proclaimed by the Administrator using the 1914 Ordinance. There was no clear theme for it as local people were asked to donate local history objects. The original museum was opened to the public in 1963. The Post Office Tree Provincial Museum was established on 1 June 1984 by the Board of Trustees. Bartolomeu Dias Museum was established on 3 February 1989 as a result of the 1988 Dias Festival. The Administrator used the Ordinance of 1975 to alter the name Post Office Tree Provincial Museum to Bartolomeu Dias Museum.

== Museums ==
=== Granary ===
The theme which was given to the Granary is reception/information and exhibitions of the surroundings areas. Granary is used as the main reception for the whole museum complex. It houses small exhibition about the regional mountain passes. It also houses conference facilities for 48 people or 100 people if used in a cinema style.

=== Maritime Museum ===
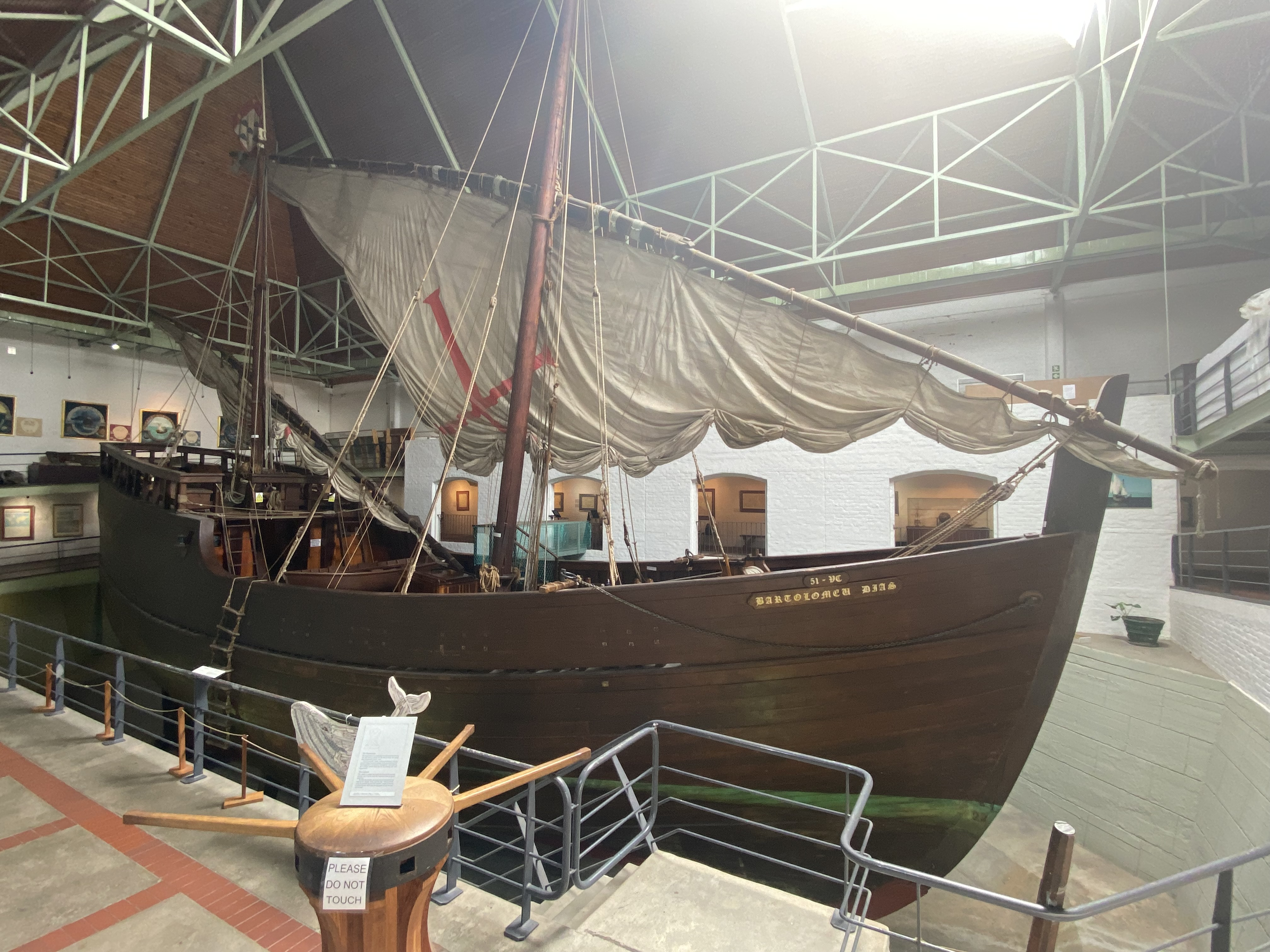
A replica of Bartolomeu Dias ship displayed in the museum.

The theme for the Maritime Museum is the Portuguese maritime history from 1488 and their connection with the English and Dutch explorers. Cultural History Museum: The heritage of Mossel Bay – the district and its people from pre-historic times until today. The Maritime Museum has exhibition displays which narrate about the history of early European sea voyagers who discovered sea routes. The local history 19th-century artefacts and 20th-century photographs are also displayed in this building. The building houses a life-size replica of the ship that was used by Bartolomeu Dias and his crew when they landed in Mossel Bay 1488. The ship was built in Portugal and it was brought to Mossel Bay in 1988.t

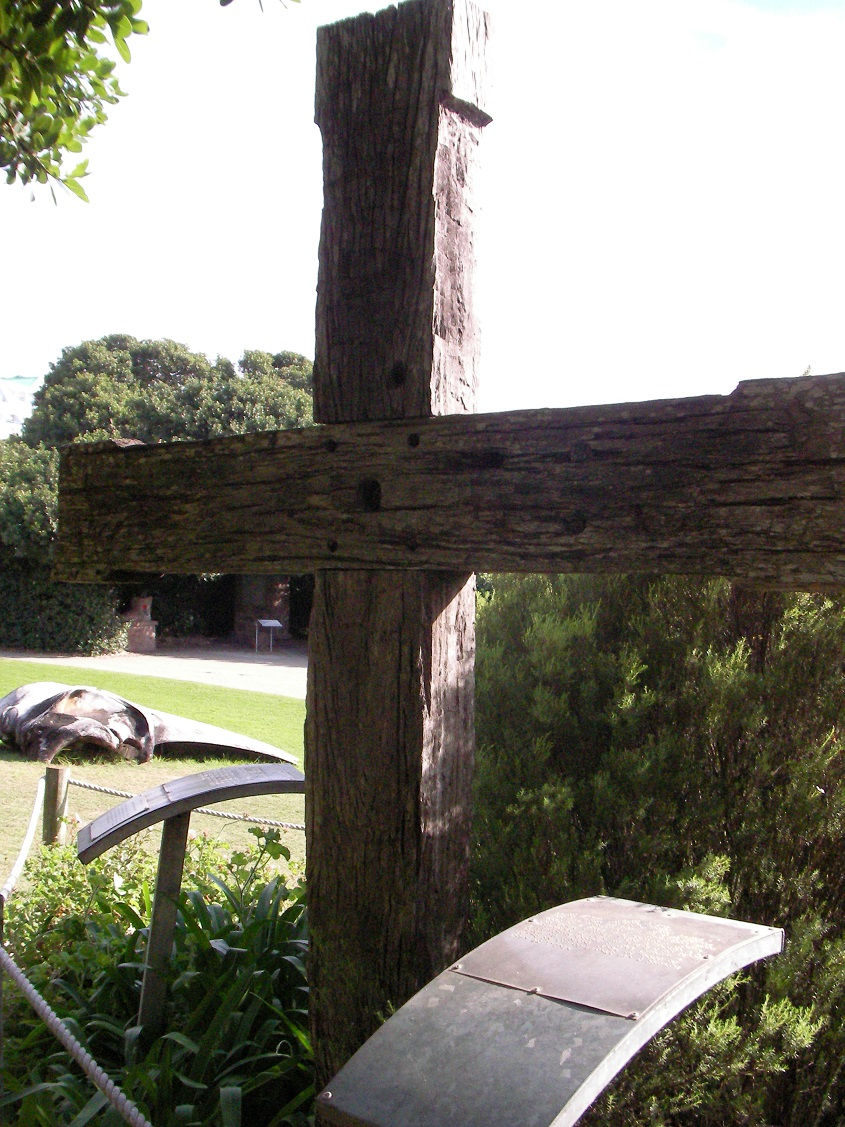
Bartolomeu Dias Museum Complex.

=== Shell Museum and Aquarium ===
The Shell Museum and Aquarium's theme is shells and molluscs (snails) – their ecology – including live molluscs in aquaria, how molluscs and shells are used by mankind etc. Shell Museum is the largest shell museum in Africa. In the same building there is also an aquarium of small sea animals.

The Munro cottages are used as offices of international archaeological researchers.

== On-site public programmes ==
The museum's management realised that collecting, exhibiting, and preserving the material evidence of the previous generation for the educational and enjoyment benefits of the current generation is not enough if a museum is a dead space with no programmes, projects, activities and events that are attractive to the public. Curriculum orientated education and outreach programmes are designed at the museum and presented to learners from the local schools. In collaboration with local governmental and non-governmental organisations, the Dias Museum host eight commemorative days’ celebrations per year.

== Stored and displayed collection ==
Traveling exhibitions are from time to time sourced from other museums and displayed at Dias Museum for a couple of months. All the staff members at Dias Museum are mandated to check the displayed collection all the time to ensure that artifacts are safe. The public access to the museum collection has improved as a monthly temporary display program allows visitors to see also the stored artifacts. There are regular new additions to the collection of small marine animals in the museum's aquarium. The Caravel, Post Office Tree, Aquarium and the museum's ethno-botanical garden and Braille trail are some of the most popular exhibits. The Dias Museum has a large indigenous garden with views of the sea.

== See also ==
- Bartolomeu Dias
- Mossel Bay
- Post Office Tree
