= Kwaaihoek =

Part of the Addo Elephant National Park, South Africa

Addo Elephant National Park (Kwaaihoek Section)
- Kwaaihoek location
- Type: National park
- Location: Boesmansriviermond
- Coordinates: 33.7035°S 26.6455°E

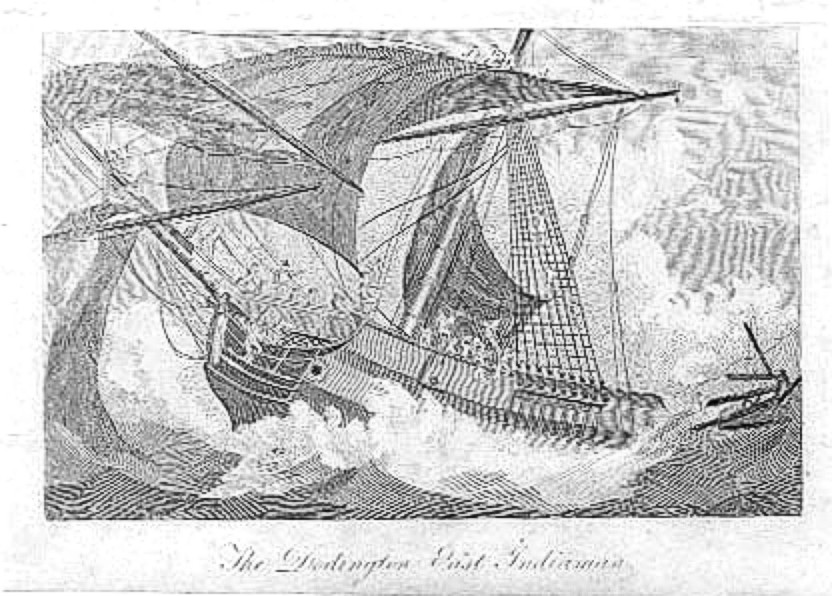
Engraving of the Doddington

Kwaaihoek is a rocky headland on the coast of Algoa Bay, at Boknesstrand near Bushman's River Mouth in the Eastern Cape province of South Africa. It is a section of the Addo Elephant National Park. It is here that the Portuguese navigator Bartolomeu Dias erected the Padrão de São Gregório, his first padrão, or stone cross on 12 March 1488. First visited by Robert Jacob Gordon on 13 February 1786, remnants of the cross were rediscovered in 1938 by E. Axelson and transferred to the University of the Witwatersrand in Johannesburg.

Shortly after midnight on 17 July 1755 and 34 kilometres (21 mi) away from Kwaaihoek, the East Indiaman Doddington struck the south-eastern corner of the low-lying Bird Island (or Chaos Island as it was then known). She went down within 20 minutes, with only 23 of the 270 passengers and crew surviving. They were marooned on the island for seven months, before they managed to make their way to India on a sloop they built on the island.

== See also ==
- Dias Cross Memorial
