= Luso-Sundanese padrão =

Stone pillar commemorating a 1522 treaty between Portugal and Sunda

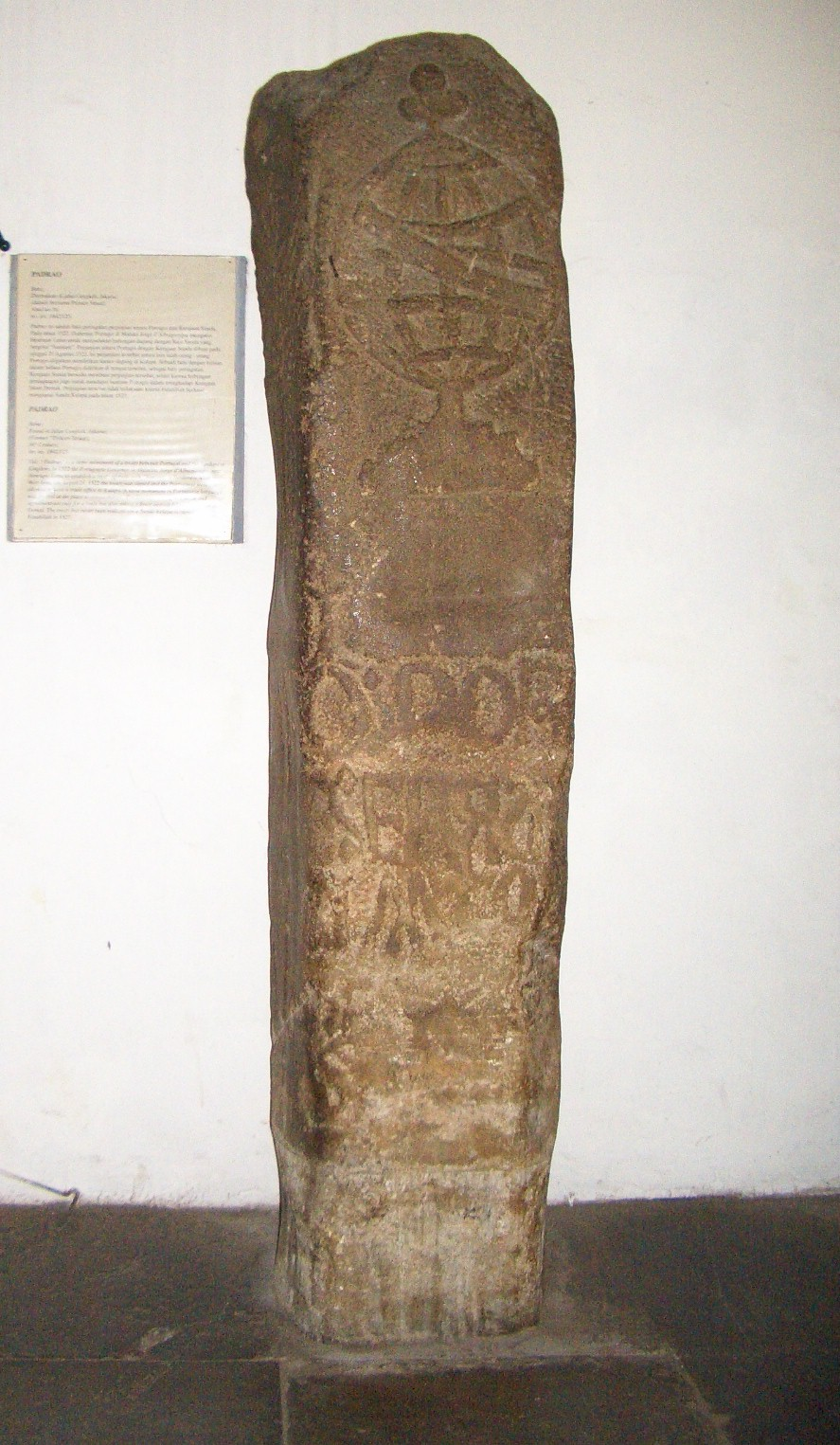
Padrão of Sunda Kalapa (1522), Indonesian National Museum, Jakarta.

The Luso-Sundanese padrão is a padrão commemorating a treaty between the kingdoms of Portugal and Sunda, better known as the Luso-Sundanese Treaty of Sunda Kalapa.

== History ==
Because of the growing Islamic force in Demak and Cirebon, the Hindu King of Sunda, Sri Baduga, sought assistance from the Portuguese at Malacca. He sent his son, Crown Prince Prabu Surawisesa, to Malacca in 1512 and again in 1521 to invite the Portuguese to sign a peace treaty, trade in pepper and build a fort at his main port of Sunda Kalapa. By 1522, the Portuguese were ready to form a coalition with the Sundanese king to gain access to the profitable pepper trade.

The commander of the fortress of Malacca at that time was Jorge de Albuquerque. In 1522, he sent a ship, the São Sebastião under Captain Henrique Leme, to Sunda Kalapa with valuable gifts for the king of Sunda. One written source detail the concluding of the treaty: the original Portuguese document of 1522, with the text of the treaty and the signatures of the witnesses.

According to that source, the Portuguese were welcomed warmly by the former crown prince, now King Prabu Surawisesa Jayapercosa (or King Surawisesa of Pajundan, also called Ratu Sang Hyang, Portuguese: Ratu Samian); Barros called him King Samião. The Portuguese were allowed to build a fortress at the mouth of the Ciliwung River, where they could load black pepper to their ships. The King also pledged to give 1000 sacks (more than 20 tons) of black pepper each year to the Portuguese. The treaty was executed in two copies, one for the king of Sunda, one for the king of Portugal; each was signed on August 21, 1522. The Sundanese king's deputies were the chief mandarin Padam Tumangu (Honourable Tumenggung), the mandarins Sangydepaty (Sang Adipati) and Benegar (Bendahara or treasurer), and the shahbandar (harbourmaster) of the land, named Fabian.

"On the said day", the mandarins and other honorable men, together with Henrique Leme and his entourage, went to the mouth of the river, where the fortress would be constructed, on the "land called Sunda Kalapa", where they erected a memorial stone, called a padrão, in what is now the Tugu subdistrict of North Jakarta. It was a Portuguese custom to set up a padrão (memorial stone) when they discovered a new land. The padrão, now called the Luso-Sundanese padrão, is kept in the National Museum.

Because of troubles in Goa, Portuguese India, the Portuguese had failed to keep their promise to come back the following year to construct the fortress. They did not return to the Java Sea until November 1526, when they arrived in six ships from Bintan under the command of Duarte Coelho and Francisco de Sá.

The padrão was rediscovered at the junction between Jalan Cengkeh and Jalan Kali Besar Timur in 1918 when the Dutch East Indies government made a reclamation in the area.

== Details ==
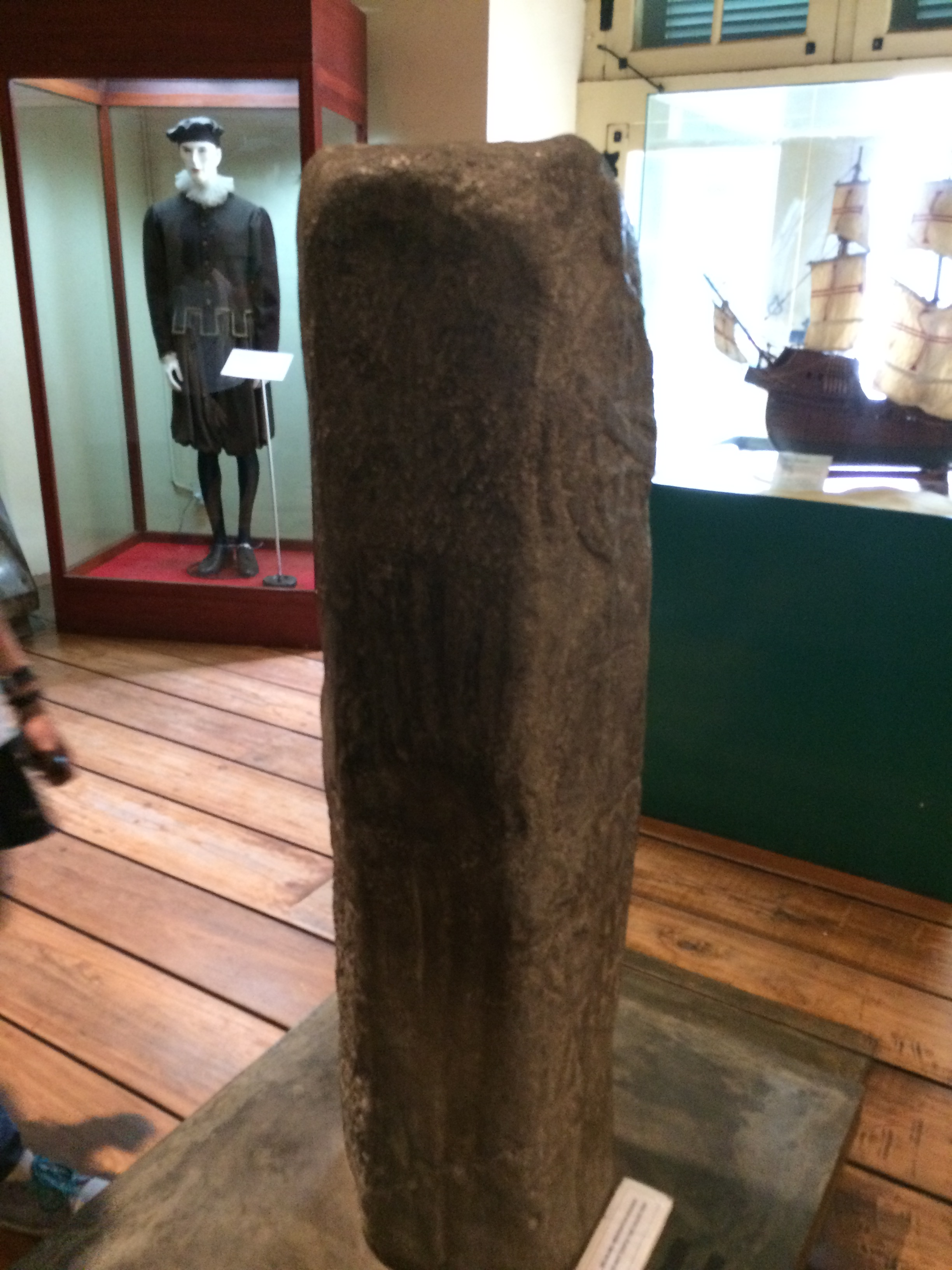
Replica of the Luso-Sundanese Padrão Monument at Jakarta History Museum

The Luso-Sundanese padrão is stone pillar that is 165 cm tall. The upper part of the padrão shows an armillary sphere, a symbol of discovery used by King Manuel of Portugal. On top of the sphere is a trefoil. A cross of the Order of Christ has been carved above the first line of the inscription. The inscription itself, OSPOR .ESFERЯa/Mo is an abbreviation of O Senhor de Portugal. Esfera/Espera de/do Mundo, meaning The Lord of Portugal. Sphere/Hope of (the) World.

== See also ==
- List of personal standards of the Kings of Portugal
