= Whittle Rock =

Granite reef in False Bay, South Africa

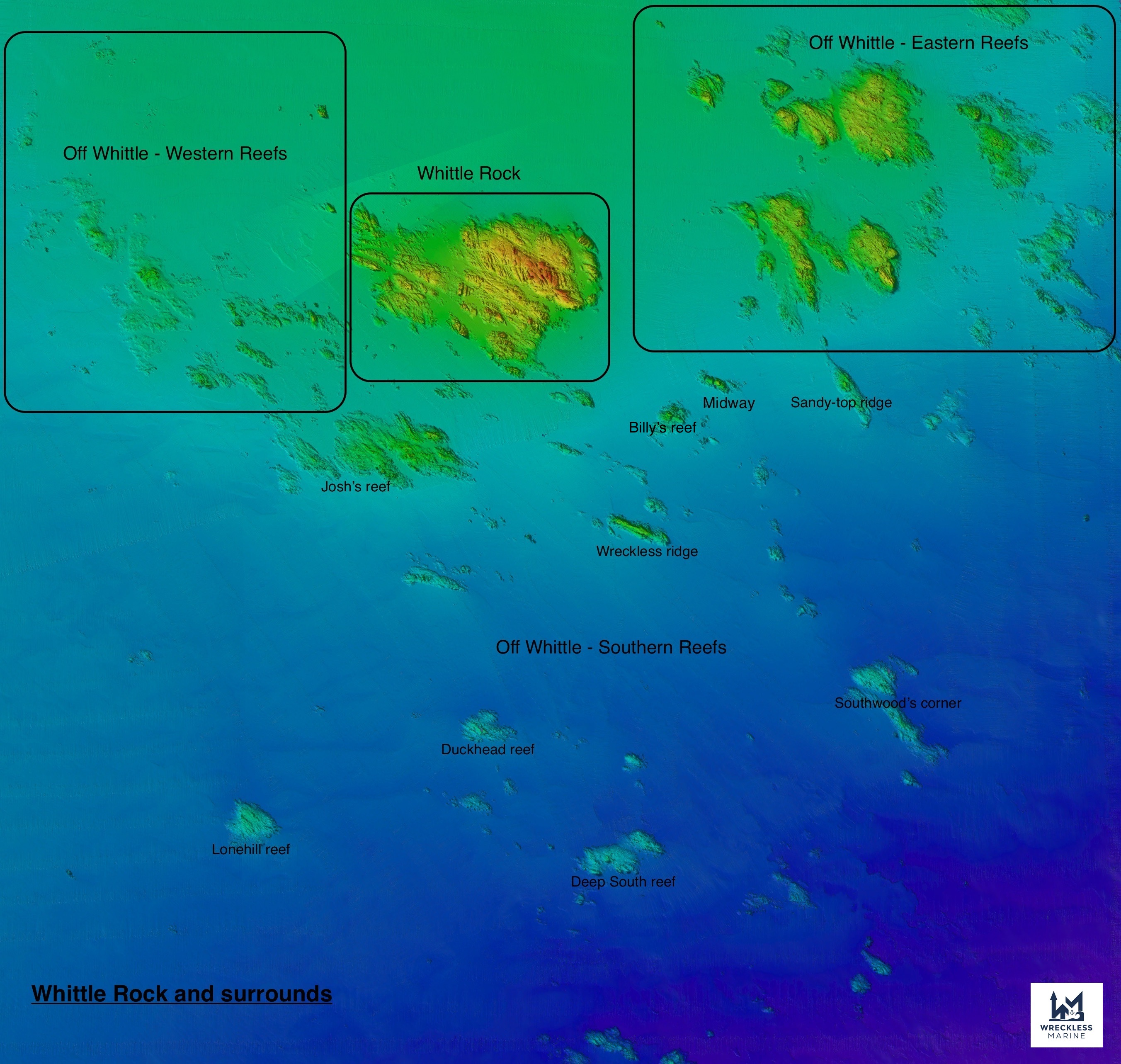
Multibeam sonar map of Whittle rock and surrounds

Whittle Rock is a granite corestone reef and navigation hazard in False Bay, Western Cape, South Africa. The reef rises from a sandy bottom at about 40 m, to a minimum depth of 3.2 m, and is a well known fishing site and recreational diving area. It has an area of about 1 km^{2}, and can affect the waves at the shore in Kalk Bay in special conditions of a long southeasterly swell. It is marked by a cardinal east buoy with sound and light signals.

== Location and extent ==
Whittle Rock is about 8 km to the east of Miller's Point which is on the coast of the Cape Peninsula just south of Simon's Town, on the west side of False Bay, at 34°14.846′S 18°33.714′E The contiguous reef is a bit over 1 km east to west, and a bit under 1 km north to south. There are several outliers in the order of 100 m size range, within 100 m of the main reef, and a lot more that are smaller. Several other granite outcrops and clusters of smaller size and greater depth exist in the vicinity. The official depth of the top of the reef is 3.2 m below datum.

== Bathymetry and topography ==
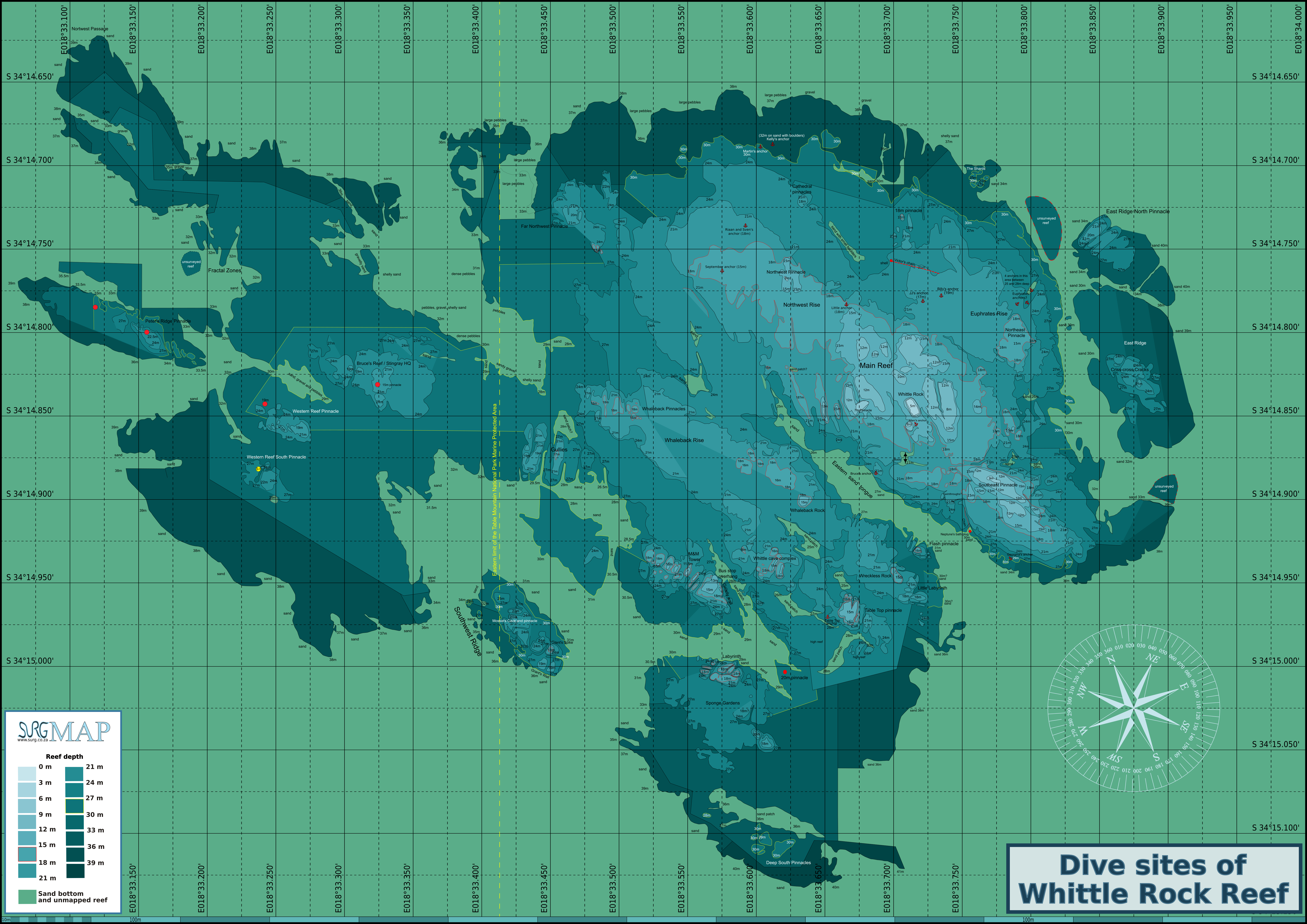
Bathymetry of the Whittle Rock reef

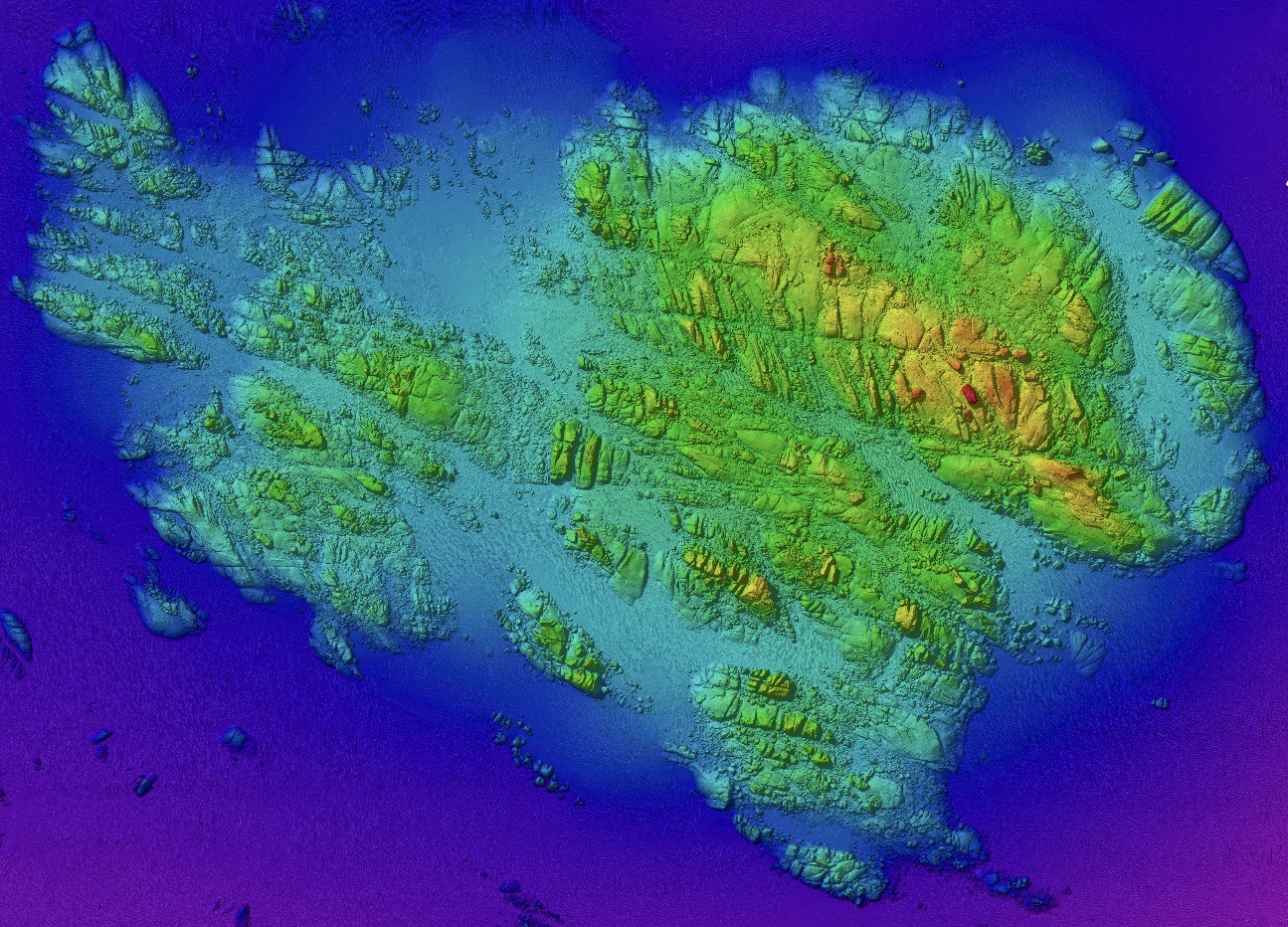
High resolution multibeam sonar image of Whittle Rock reef complex by Wreckless Marine, 2025

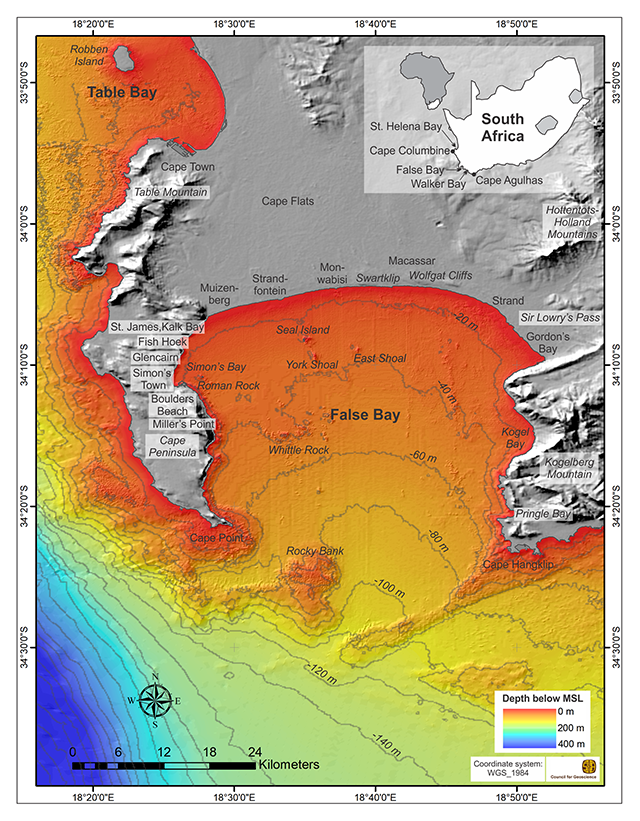
False Bay Bathymetry from SA Council for Geoscience

Minimum depth according to the chart is 3.2 m at low tide, and maximum depth at the edge of the reef is about 42 m in the south. Almost the entire reef is above 40 m, the maximum depth for most recreational diving, Most of the reef is above 30 m, the general limit for recreational diving, and a fairly large amount above 18 m, the usual limit for most entry level scuba certification to ISO 24801-2 autonomous diver.

The reef comprises a series of primary ridges with approximately northwest–southeast alignment, and secondary jointing across the main ridges, with associated relatively narrow gullies in a generally north–south direction, as can be seen from the multibeam sonar image.

== Geology ==
Whittle Rock and the other reefs of this part of False Bay are outcrops of the Peninsula Granite, a huge batholith that was intruded into the Malmesbury Group about 630 million years ago as molten rock and crystallised deep in the earth, but has since then been exposed by prolonged erosion. The characteristic spheroidal shapes of granite boulders are a result of preferential weathering along intersecting fractures and are well displayed above sea level around Llandudno and Simonstown. Close up, the granite is a coarse-grained rock consisting of large (2–5 cm) white or pink feldspar crystals, glassy brown quartz and flakes of black mica, and occasionally containing inclusions of dark Malmesbury hornfels.

Though initially intruded at great depth, prolonged erosion eventually exposed the granite at the surface, and it and what remains of the similarly eroded Malmesbury group now form a basement upon which younger sedimentary rocks of the Table Mountain Group were deposited.

Almost all the exposed granite has been extensively weathered and is in the form of rounded corestones. The colour is generally pale to medium grey, and the surface is typically fairly rough, with clearly visible crystals, and no layered structure. The massive rock is cracked on jointing planes, in directions which tend to be characteristic of the location, and weathering and erosion has accentuated these joints, in places widening them to form deep gullies. The general direction and spacing of joints in some areas is fairly consistent over quite large areas.

There are areas of rubble, gravel, pebbles, and shell along the edges of the reef, with much of the pebbled area to the north, but the surrounding surficial unconsolidated material is predominantly fine sand at depths from 30 to 42 m. There are also scattered sand patches in locally low areas, and these often have a relatively high shell content.

== History ==
In 1672 the Dutch warship Goudvinck was stationed at the Cape and was instructed to survey False Bay, but it is not known how much was done before they were recalled. Simon van der Stel, appointed commander of the station in 1679, sailed False Bay in November 1687 on the ship De Noord, took the earliest recorded soundings, and described the islands, reefs and shoreline of the bay. By the end of the 17th century the general bathymetry was known.

The Whittle Rock reef is named after a lieutenant Whittle of the Royal Navy, who surveyed parts of False Bay after HMS Indent was damaged off Miller's Point soon after the first British occupation of the Cape in 1795. Whittle Rock is the only navigational hazard of relevant depth that is "off Miller's Point".

There are two shipwrecks associated with the reef: The British East Indiaman Euphrates, which may have struck the reef in 1810, and was damaged, but repaired, and HMS Trident, which is reported to have sunk after striking the reef, but the position of its wreck is not recorded, though there are several large anchors of appropriate age known on the reef.

== Navigational hazard ==
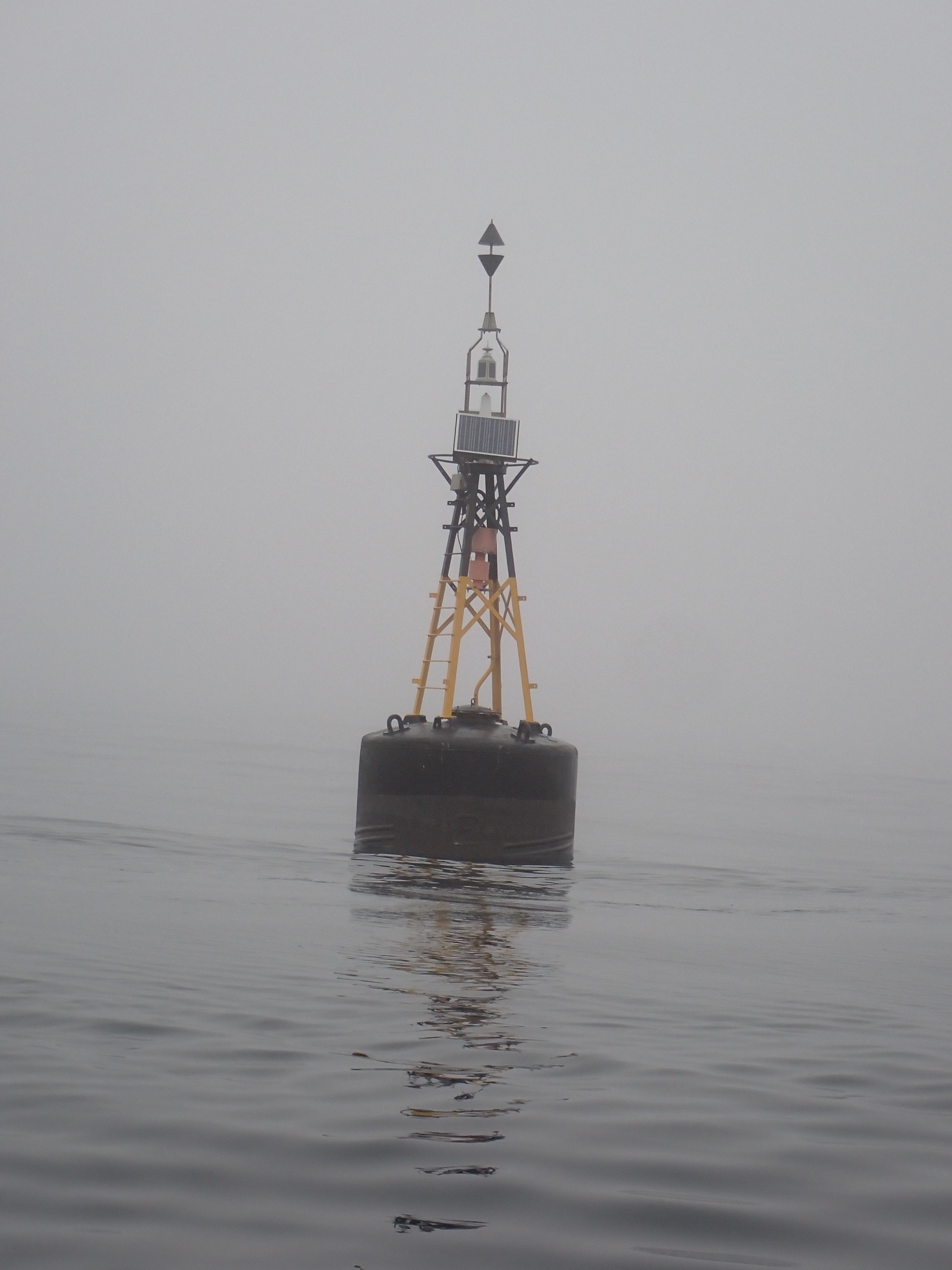
East cardinal buoy at Whittle Rock in 2021

Whittle Rock is a significant navigational hazard due to its depth and position, though very few large ships enter the bay, as fishing is limited and it is off the shipping lanes. However False Bay is occasionally used for shelter in storms. The seas occasionally break over the top of the reef, but the shallow area is small and not easily seen in a rough sea. The reef is marked by a Cardinal East marker buoy, with sound and light signals, moored at S34°14.876' E18°33.709', about 50 m south of the main pinnacle. The buoy was removed for servicing and repairs in early 2025.

== Influence on wave propagation ==
The reef at Whittle Rock can focus longer period south-easterly waves on Kalk Bay. This is unusual and associated with a cut-off low pressure system causing the south-easterly winds to blow for an unusually long time over enough fetch to develop a sea sufficiently for it to be refracted by the shoal area.

== Economic importance ==
Whittle Rock is a well known area for artisanal and recreational line fishing, and a moderately popular recreational scuba diving area.

=== Recreational dive sites ===
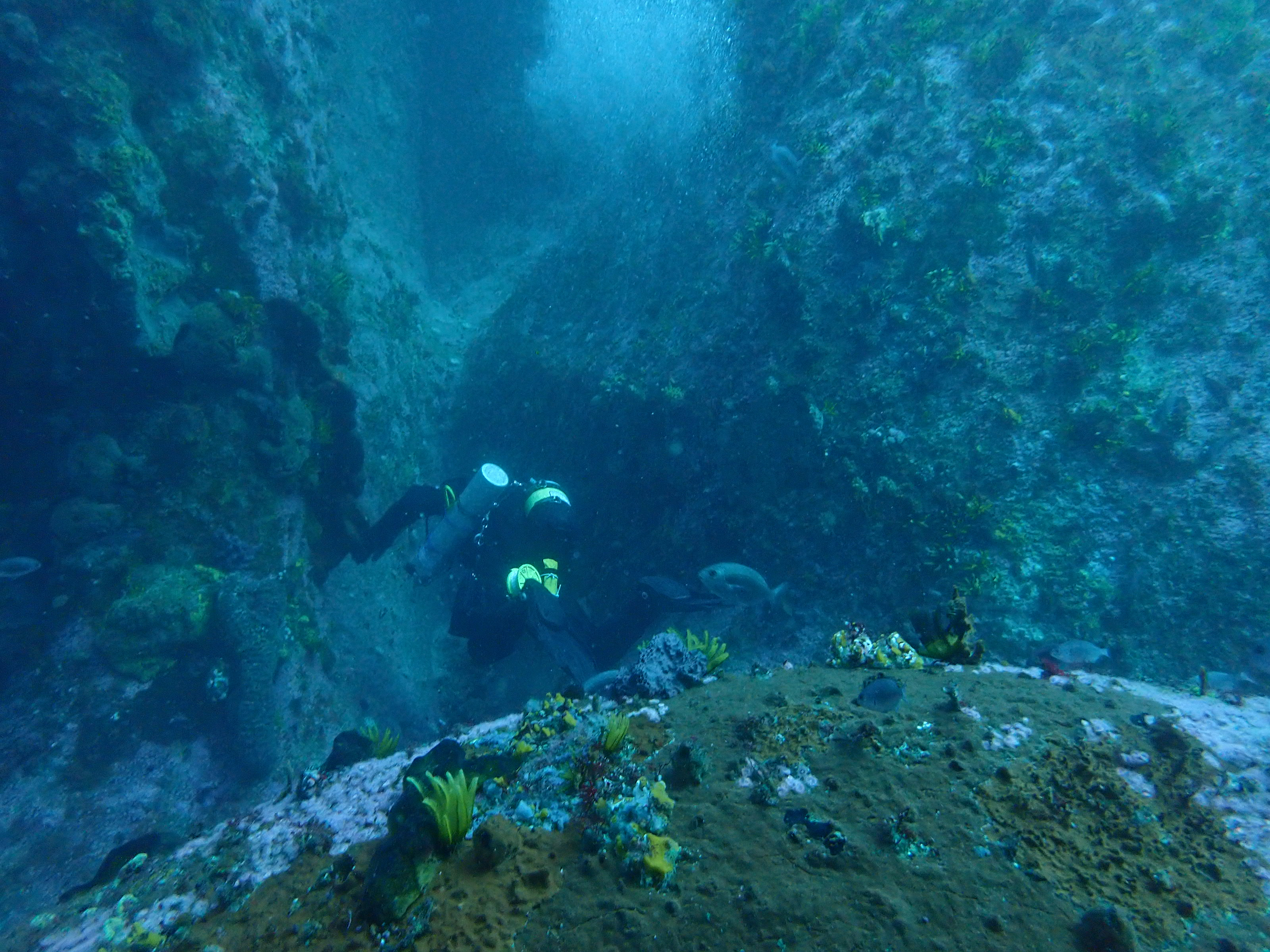
Recreational scuba diving at Whittle Rock reef

Most of the recreational dive sites of False Bay, including some on the Whittle Rock reef, are in the Table Mountain National Park Marine Protected Area. A permit is required to scuba dive in any MPA in South Africa. These permits are valid for a year and are available at some branches of the Post Office. Temporary permits, valid for a month, may be available at dive shops or from dive boat operators who operate in an MPA. A personal recreational scuba diving permit is valid in all South African MPAs where recreational diving is allowed. The business permit to operate recreational scuba business operations in an MPA is restricted to a specific MPA. Diving for commercial or scientific purposes is also subject to permit. Whittle Rock has a number of recreational dive sites which have been identified by position and named. Some of them are listed here (north to south):

- North-west Passage: 34°14.650′S 18°33.125′E
- Kelly's Anchor: 34°14.687′S 18°33.612′E
- Shards Cluster: 34°14.704′S 18°33.763′E
- Riaan and Sven's anchor: 34°14.735′S 18°33.590′E
- East Ridge North Pinnacle: 34°14.742′S 18°33.843′E
- Fractal Zones: 34°14.750′S 18°33.200′E
- North-west corner pinnacles: 34°14.750′S 18°33.482′E
- September anchor: 34°14.762′S 18°33.575′E
- Whittle Rock North-west Pinnacle: 34°14.765′S 18°33.622′E
- Euphrates anchors: 34°14.776′S 18°33.801′E, 34°14.783′S 18°33.790′E and 34°14.783′S 18°33.795′E
- Billy's anchor: 34°14.777′S 18°33.734′E
- JJ's anchor: 34°14.781′S 18°33.720′E
- Little anchor: 34°14.785″S 18°33.666′E
- Peter's Ridge: 34°14.800′S 18°33.160′E
- Criss-cross Cracks: 34°14.830′S 18°33.879′E
- Bruce's Reef: 34°14.824′S 18°33.318′E
- Whittle Rock West Pinnacle: 34°14.844′S 18°33.682′E
- Whittle Rock (Shallowest pinnacle): 34°14.846′S 18°33.714′E, about 8 km offshore
- Whaleback Pinnacles: 34°14.850′S 18°33.508′E
- Whittle Rock Western Reef Pinnacle: 34°14.856′S 18°33.269′E, inside the TMNPMPA
- Marc's anchor: 34°14.856′S 18°33.716′E
- Gullies: 34°14.872′S 18°33.454′E
- Whittle Rock South-east Pinnacle: 34°14.887′S 18°33.775′E
- Whaleback Rock: 34°14.900′S 18°33.635′E
- South east pinnacle chain (Neptune's bath plug): 34°14.917′S 18°33.753′E
- Flash pinnacle: 34°14.931′S 18°33.718′E
- Georgina's anchor: 34°14.935′S 18°33.784′E
- M&M Tower (the Spark plug): 34°14.943′S 18°33.549′E
- Cave Complex reef: 34°14.943′S 18°33.616′E
- Bus Stop (the Gnarly wall): 34°14.945′S 18°33.573′E
- Wreckless Rock and the Little Labyrinth: 34°14.949′S 18°33.707′E
- Table Top pinnacle: 34°14.968′S 18°33.668′E
- Mossie's Cave and pinnacle: 34°14.972′S 18°33.420′E
- Grant's Spike (South-western pinnacles): 34°14.991′S 18°33.450′E
- Grant's Wall: 34°15.003′S 18°33.445′E
- Labyrinth: 34°15.004′S 18°33.580′E
- Labyrinth South Pinnacle: 34°15.048′S 18°33.606′E
- Deep South Pinnacle: 34°15.103′S 18°33.603′E

== Ecology and conservation ==
False Bay is at the extreme western end of the inshore Agulhas marine ecoregion which extends from Cape Point to the Mbashe river over the continental shelf, in the overlap zone between Cape Agulhas and Cape Point where the warm Agulhas Current and the cooler South Atlantic waters mix. This ecoregion has the highest number of South African endemics, and is a breeding area for many species. The transition between the Agulhas ecoregion and the cooler Benguela ecoregion is at Cape Point, on the western boundary of False Bay.

=== Conservation ===
The eastern boundary of the controlled area of the Table Mountain National Park Marine Protected Area is at E 018°15.000'. which passes through Whittle Rock reef. Extraction and harvesting of marine life, and other activities, are allowed on condition that one has a valid permit allowing one or more of the following specific activities: spear fishing, angling, scuba diving, snorkelling for mollusc extraction, boating, commercial diving, salvage operations, scientific research, commercial fishing, whale watching, shark cage diving or filming. Specific conditions apply to each of these activities.

=== Habitats ===
There are three major types of habitat in the vicinity of the reef, based on type of substrate, the base on or in which benthic organisms can settle and anchor themselves. Rocky reefs provide a firm fixed substrate for the attachment of plants and animals. Sandy bottoms are a relatively unstable substrate and cannot anchor many benthic organisms. Open water, above the substrate and clear of the kelp forest, is where the organisms must drift or swim.

The benthic habitat types for Whittle Rock according to the National Biodiversity Assessment are hard inner shelf on the reef, and sandy inner shelf on the surrounding sand.

In general, marine organisms are not particular about the material of the substrate if the texture and strength are suitable and it is not toxic. For many marine organisms the substrate is another type of marine organism, and it is common for several layers to co-exist.

The type of rock of the reef influences the range of possibilities for the local topography, which in turn influences the range of habitats provided, and therefore the diversity of inhabitants. Granite corestone reefs generally have a relatively smooth surface in the centimetre to decimetre scale, but are often high profile in the metre scale, so they provide macro-variations in habitat from relatively horizontal upper surface, near vertical sides, to overhangs, holes and tunnels, on a similar scale to the boulders and outcrops themselves. There are relatively few small crevices compared to the overall surface area, except in areas with many small boulders. The coastline in this region was considerably lower during the most recent ice-ages, and the detail topography of the reef was largely formed during the period of exposure above sea level.

Kelp forests are a variation of rocky reefs, as the kelp requires a fairly strong and stable substrate which can withstand the loads of repeated waves dragging on the kelp plants. The Split-fan kelp Laminaria pallida grows mostly on deeper reefs, where there is not so much competition from the sea bamboo. Both these kelp species provide food and shelter for a variety of other organisms.

Sandy bottoms superficially appear to be fairly barren areas, as they lack the stability to support many of the spectacular reef based benthic species, and the variety of large organisms is relatively low. The sand is frequently being moved around by wave action, to a greater or lesser degree depending on depth, weather conditions, and exposure of the area. This means that sessile organisms must be specifically adapted to areas of relatively loose substrate to thrive in them, and the variety of species found on a sandy or gravel bottom will depend on all these factors. Sandy bottoms have one important compensation for their instability, animals can burrow into the sand and move up and down within its layers, which can provide feeding opportunities and protection from predation. Other species can dig themselves holes in which to shelter, or may feed by filtering water drawn through the tunnel, or by extending body parts adapted to this function into the water above the sand.

The pelagic water column is the major part of the living space at sea. This is the water between the surface and the top of the benthic zone, where living organisms swim, float or drift, and the food chain starts with phytoplankton, the mostly microscopic photosynthetic organisms that convert the energy of sunlight into organic material which feeds everything else, directly or indirectly. In temperate seas there are distinct seasonal cycles of phytoplankton growth, based on the available nutrients and the available sunlight. Either can be a limiting factor. Phytoplankton tend to thrive where there is plenty of light, and they themselves are a major factor in restricting light penetration to greater depths, so the photosynthetic zone tends to be shallower in areas of high productivity. Zooplankton feed on the phytoplankton, and are in turn eaten by larger animals. The larger pelagic animals are generally faster moving and more mobile, giving them the option of changing depth to feed or to avoid predation, and to move to other places in search of a better food supply.

=== Marine life ===
The benthic communities are typical of offshore reefs of the region, and are distributed largely according to depth, slope, rugosity and exposure to illumination and water motion, which is mainly wave motion, and to a lesser extent, wind induced current, which is variable over the short term. The shallower areas tend to be dominated by split-fan kelp Laminaria pallida and red-bait ascidians Pyura stolonifera, particularly on the flatter upper surfaces, while deeper, steeper faces may have a heavy cover of the elegant feather star Tropiometra carinata. Below about 25 m, the proportion of sponges increases.

The fish life also varies a bit with depth, and can vary seasonally and with weather and water conditions, such as temperature, visibility, and light levels.

== See also ==
- False Bay – Bay of the Atlantic Ocean at South Africa
- Geology of Cape Town
- Table Mountain National Park Marine Protected Area – Marine conservation area around the Cape Peninsula in South Africa
