= Volo (barque) =

500-ton Norwegian barque stranded in the Bushman River in South Africa

History

Norway
- Name: Volo
- Builder: Arendal, Norway Constructor: master shipbuilder Ole Martin Olsen at Indre Bratteklev shipyard on Tromøya outside Arendal in 1891
- Fate: Wrecked on 6 March 1896

General characteristics
- Type: Cargo Barque
- Tonnage: 593 tons

Volo was a Norwegian barque based in Arendal. Built for the timber trade, she carried cargo between Europe, Africa, the Americas and the Pacific before being wrecked near the mouth of the Bushman River in South Africa on 6 March 1896. All 12 crew members survived.

== Construction and early voyages ==
Volo was built by master shipbuilder Ole Martin Olsen at the Indre Bratteklev shipyard on Tromøya, near Arendal. She was operated by the shipping company Chr. Eyde & Hein, and her first captain was Knud Knudsen.

On 6 February 1892, Volo left Arendal on a series of trading voyages that would keep her away from her home port for more than three years. After loading timber in Fredrikstad, Norway, she sailed for southern Africa, arriving in Algoa Bay on 10 June following 73 days at sea.

From Algoa Bay, she crossed the Atlantic to Pensacola, United States, where she loaded timber for another voyage to southern Africa. She then crossed the Indian Ocean, sailed around Australia and visited Tonga and Samoa in the Pacific.

On 26 January 1894, Volo departed Samoa with a cargo of copra, or dried coconut flesh. She reached Cádiz, Spain, 127 days later. She subsequently sailed to South America, where she loaded wheat for the return voyage to Europe.

== Rescue of the crew of Ponemah ==
In the early hours of 26 March 1895, while crossing the Atlantic, the crew of Volo sighted the Swedish barque Ponemah in distress. The vessel had sprung a leak, and her mate and one sailor had already died. Volo rescued the surviving crew members.

She returned to Arendal in the late summer of 1895.

== Final voyage and wreck ==
On 30 November 1895, Volo left Gothenburg, Sweden, carrying a cargo of Baltic pine boards bound for Lourenço Marques, now Maputo, on Delagoa Bay in Portuguese East Africa. She sailed under Captain Martin Karinius Olsen, who was making his first long voyage in command of the vessel.

The first months of the voyage passed without major incident. Navigating by dead reckoning, Captain Olsen estimated on 5 March 1896 that the ship was approximately 200 miles from the coast.

The following morning, in thick fog and rough seas, the crew suddenly sighted breaking waves ahead. Olsen ordered a change of course, but the ship struck rocks near the mouth of the Bushman River before she could turn clear. The impact damaged her keel and breached the hull. Waves then carried her over the reef and onto the beach between Kwaaihoek and the river mouth.

Heavy seas swept across the deck, flooding the deckhouses and forcing the crew to take shelter in the rigging. The fog initially concealed the shore, but as it began to lift about 15 minutes later, the men discovered that they were only two ship lengths from land.

Local people soon gathered on the beach to help. Several attempts to get a line ashore failed before a local farmer swam out to the vessel and brought a line back to the beach. With assistance from those on shore, all 12 crew members reached safety. Captain Olsen was the last to leave the wreck.

Local farmers cared for the survivors. One crew member required hospital treatment for an injury.

== Salvage and remains ==
Volo was beyond repair. Her keel was broken, and much of her hull had been shattered. The surviving cargo and salvageable parts of the vessel were sold at auction. Some of the timber and material recovered from the wreck were used to build houses in the surrounding area.

The remains were gradually broken up by the sea and weather or buried beneath the sand. Portions of the wreck have occasionally reappeared, including remains reported in 1999. Other salvaged artefacts have been displayed locally, while timber from the vessel and her cargo survives in nearby houses.

Editorial note: The supplied accounts disagree on the construction date (the 1880s or 1891) and tonnage (500 tons or 593 registered tons), so those details have been omitted pending verification. The phrase “front tire” is unclear and has also been omitted.
