= Padrão =

Stone pillars erected by Portuguese mariners

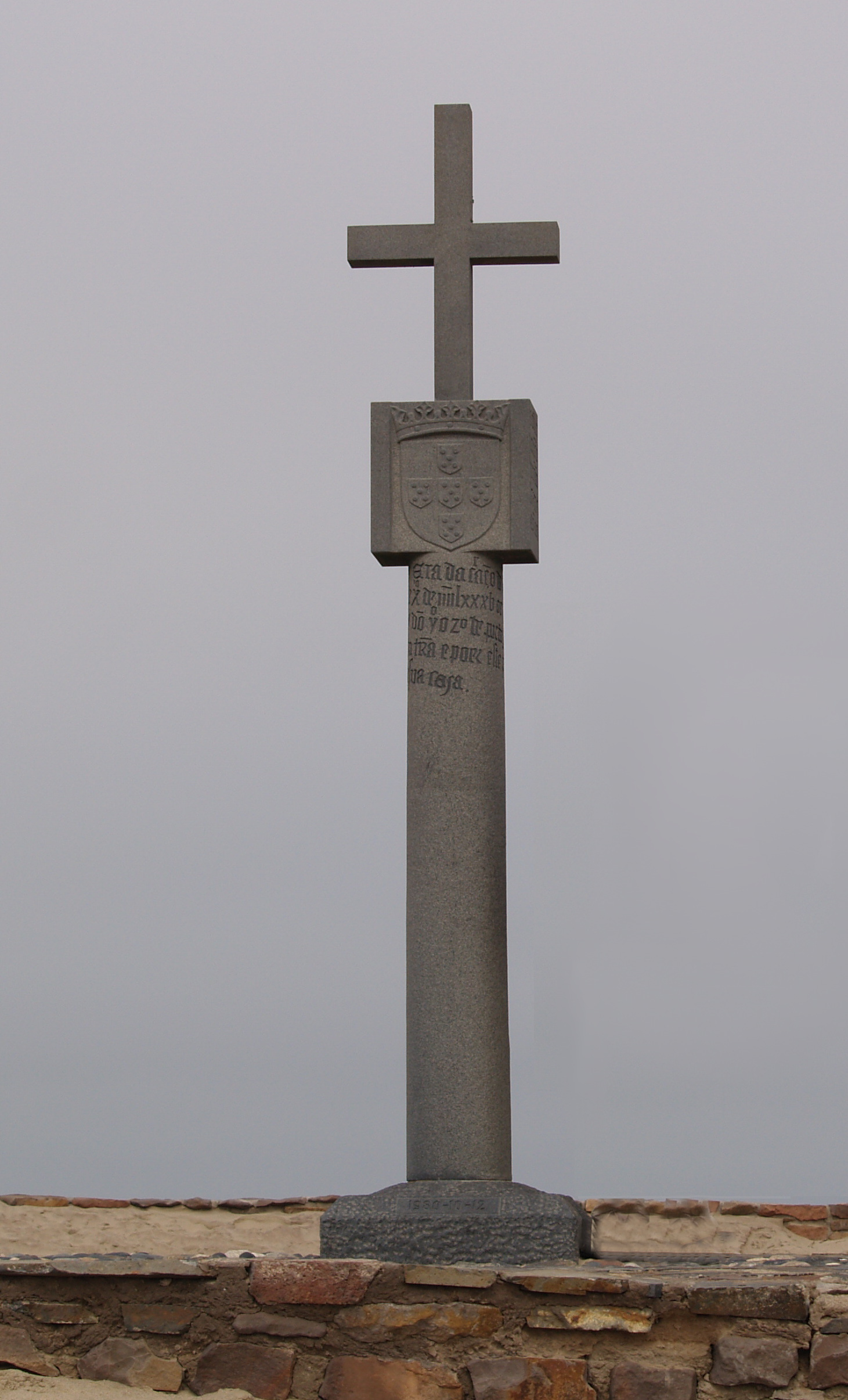
Replica of a padrão placed by Diogo Cão on Cape Cross, Namibia.

A padrão (Portuguese pronunciation: [pɐˈðɾɐ̃w], lit. 'standard'; plural: padrões) is a stone pillar left by Portuguese maritime explorers in the 15th and 16th centuries to record significant landfalls and thereby establish primacy and possession. They were often placed on promontories and capes or at the mouths of major rivers. Early markers were simple wooden pillars or crosses but they deteriorated quickly in the tropical climate where they were often erected. Later, padrões were carved from stone in the form of a pillar surmounted by a cross and the royal coat of arms.

== History ==
Diogo Cão was the first to place stone padrões on his voyage of discovery along the coast of Africa in 1482–1484. They had been carved ahead of time in Portugal and carried in his ship at the behest of King João II. Cão placed the pillars at points in what is now Gabon, Angola and Namibia. The first was installed at the mouth of the river Congo. In August 1483 he erected one on the headlands of Angola at Cabo Negro with the inscription:

In the era of 6681 years from the creation of the world, 1482 years since the birth of Our Lord Jesus, the most High and Excellent and Mighty Prince, King D. João II of Portugal, sent Diogo Cão squire of his House to discover this land and place these pillars.

Subsequent excavations and surveys, particularly by Eric Axelson in the 1950s, located the remains of a number of the padrões. Some of the crosses were fragmentary, but could be identified from their use of Portuguese limestone.

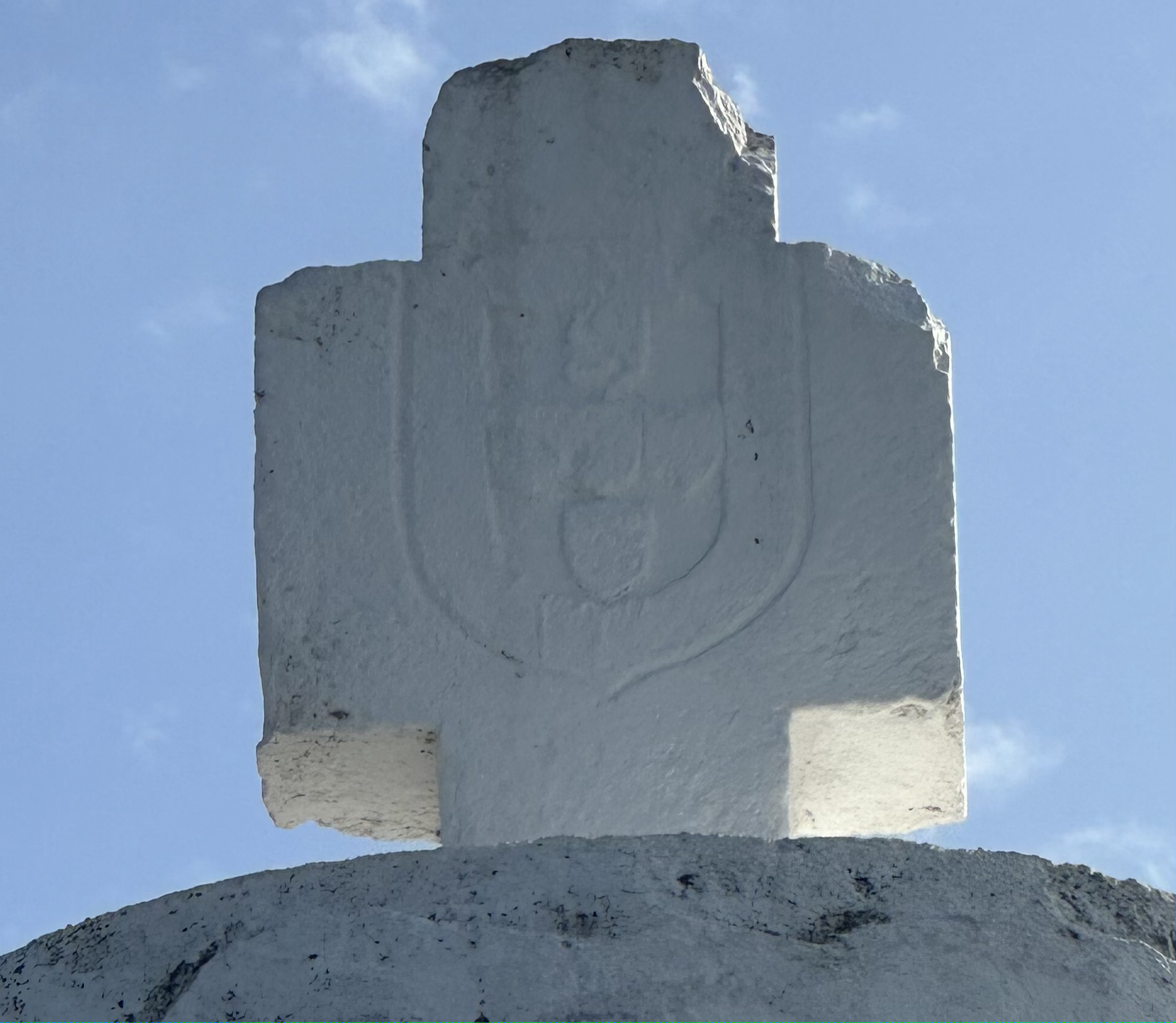
Limestone cross on the Vasco da Gama Pillar in Malindi displaying the coat of arms of Portugal

In 1498 Vasco da Gama erected a padrão at Malindi in East Africa before setting across the Indian Ocean to Calicut. This is known today as the Vasco da Gama Pillar and includes the original cross, made from Portuguese limestone.

In 1522 the Portuguese mariner Henrique Leme negotiated a treaty with the Sunda Kingdom and in commemoration he raised a padrão at the kingdom's main port, Sunda Kalapa, now part of Jakarta, Indonesia. The Luso Sundanese padrão was rediscovered in 1918 and is exhibited at the National Museum of Indonesia.

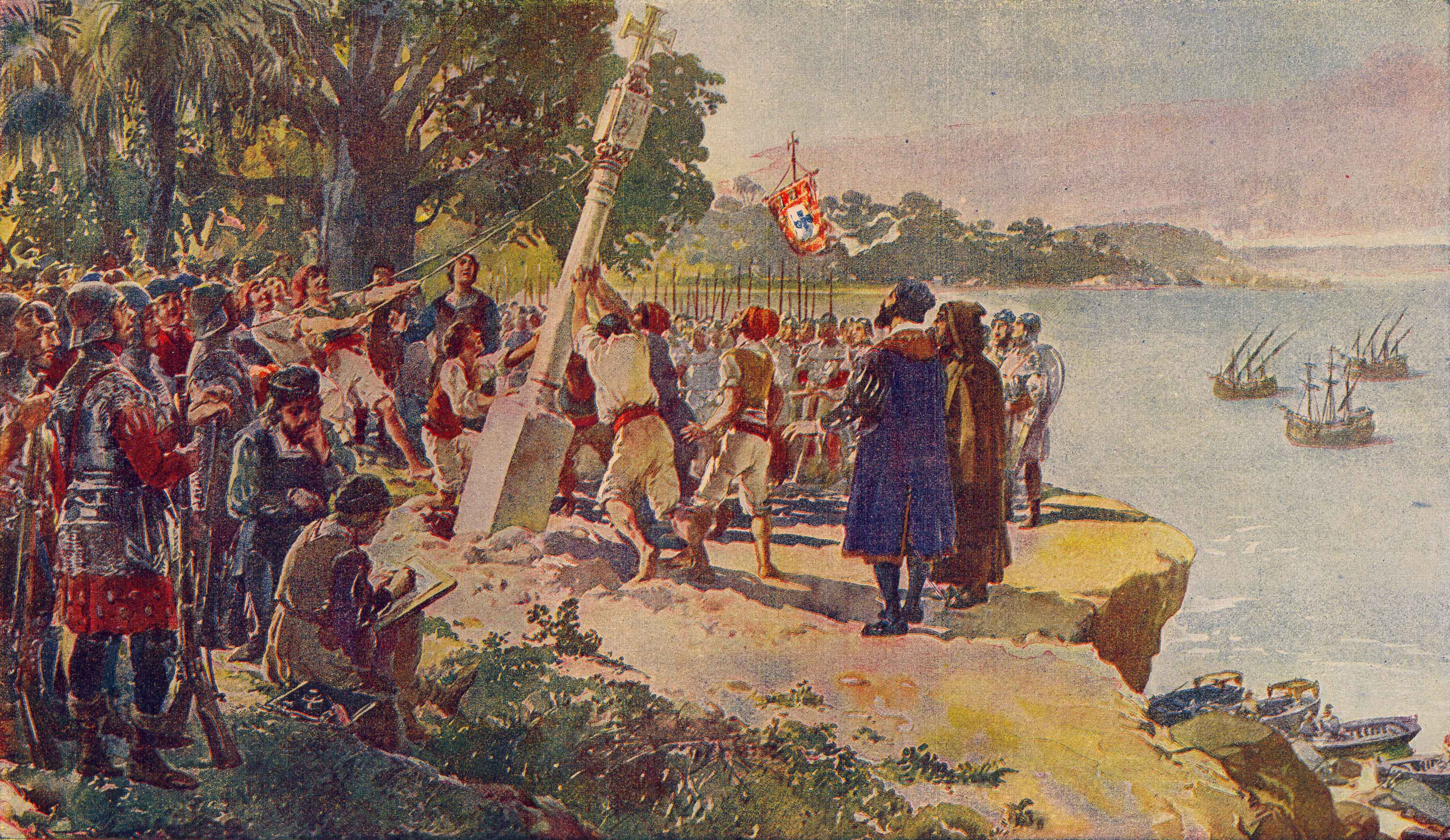
The erection of a padrão on the mouth of Zaire River, drawing by Alfredo Roque Gameiro

Other notable explorers known to have erected padrões include Pero da Covilhã, Bartolomeu Dias, Goncalo Coelho and Jorge Álvares.

In the 20th century, the Lisbon Geographic Society managed to restore three padrões erected by Diogo Cão and one by Bartolomeu Dias.

At the Dias Cross Memorial on the coast of South Africa's Eastern Cape province, there is a replica padrão on a promontory at what is now known as Kwaaihoek. The original was erected by Bartolomeu Dias in 1488 to mark the site of his easternmost landfall after becoming the first European navigator to round the Cape of Good Hope. The original padrão was discovered by Eric Axelson in the 1930s; it had fallen, or been pushed, off the top of Kwaaihoek, and lay in pieces in the gullies below. Axelson recovered the pieces and was able to reconstruct the stone monument. The reconstructed original now stands in the William Cullen Library of the University of the Witwatersrand in Johannesburg.

== List of padrões ==
N°	Country	City	Year	Explorer	Original	Coordinates	Picture
01	Angola	Soyo, Ponta do Padrao (south bank of Congo River mouth); Sao Jorge pillar.	1482	Diogo Cão	Sociedade de Geografia de Lisboa	6.076099°S 12.332271°E	
02	Angola	Cabo do Lobo, Santo Agostinho pillar.	1483, 28 August	Diogo Cão	Sociedade de Geografia de Lisboa	13.418611°S 12.533333°E	
03	Angola	Cabo Negro, Monte Negro pillar	1486, 18 January	Diogo Cão	Sociedade de Geografia de Lisboa	15.7°S 12°E	
04	Namibia	Cape Cross, Cabo do Padrao pillar.	1486	Diogo Cão	Port of Walvis Bay	21.772777°S 13.9508333°E	
05	South Africa	Kwaaihoek, Sao Gregorio pillar	1488, 12 March	Bartholomew Dias	William Cullen Library, University of the Witwatersrand, Johannesburg.	33.7035°S 26.6455°E	
06	South Africa	Cape of Good Hope, Sao Filipe pillar	1488, 6 June	Bartholomew Dias	?	34.3579413°S 18.4723393°E	
07	Namibia	Dias Point, Lüderitz Bay, Santiago pillar	1488, 25 June	Bartholomew Dias	Fragments at National Museum of Namibia	26.63652°S 15.09297°E	
08	Kenya	Malindi	1498	Vasco da Gama	Vasco da Gama Pillar, Malindi	3.22395°S 40.12965°E	
09	Indonesia	Sunda Kalapa, Luso-Sundanese padrão	1522, 21 August	Henrique Leme	National Museum of Indonesia	6.176042°S 106.822155°E	

== See also ==
- Padrão dos Descobrimentos

== Sources ==
- Axelson, Eric (1961). "Prince Henry the Navigator and the Discovery of the Sea Route to India". The Geographical Journal. 127 (2): 145–155. doi:10.2307/1792890. ISSN 0016-7398.
- Bell, Christopher (1974). Portugal and the Quest for the Indies. New York: Barnes & Noble. ISBN 9780064903523.
- Crowley, Roger (2015). Conquerors: How Portugal Forged the First Global Empire. New York: Random House. ISBN 9780812994001.
- Gunn, Geoffrey C. (2011). History Without Borders: The Making of an Asian World Region, 1000-1800. Hong Kong University Press.
- McLachlan, Gavin (2013). "Bartolomeu Dias Cross - Replica". Artefacts.
- Ravenstein, E. G. (1900). "The Voyages of Diogo Cão and Bartholomeu Dias, 1482-88". The Geographical Journal. 16 (6): 625–655. doi:10.2307/1775267. hdl:2027/mdp.39015050934820. ISSN 0016-7398. JSTOR 1775267.
- Russell-Wood, A. J. R. (1998). The Portuguese Empire, 1415-1808. Baltimore: Johns Hopkins University Press. ISBN 0801859557.
