= Dias Cross Memorial =

South African memorial

Coordinates: 33°43′07″S 26°37′26″E

The Dias Cross Memorial is a provincial heritage site at Kwaaihoek, Alexandria in the Eastern Cape province of South Africa.

In 1945 it was described in the Government Gazette as:

A minor road turns sharply off to the right from the main road that leads from Alexandria to Bushman’s River Mouth; it passes Boknes and comes to an end near the coast. About a kilometre further east from the end of the road, beyond the sand dunes, lies Kwaaihoek, also known as False Island, a high promontory that juts out towards the sea. On top of the headland that extends the furthest Bartholomew Diaz, the famous Portuguese navigator and discoverer of the Cape, erected a cross or padrao on 12th March, 1488. A replica of the cross has been erected on the same bleak, exposed spot.

— Government Gazette of South Africa,

The remains of the original cross erected by Bartolomeu Dias are located at the University of the Witwatersrand in Johannesburg.
