= Bartolomeu Dias =

Portuguese maritime explorer (c. 1450–1500)

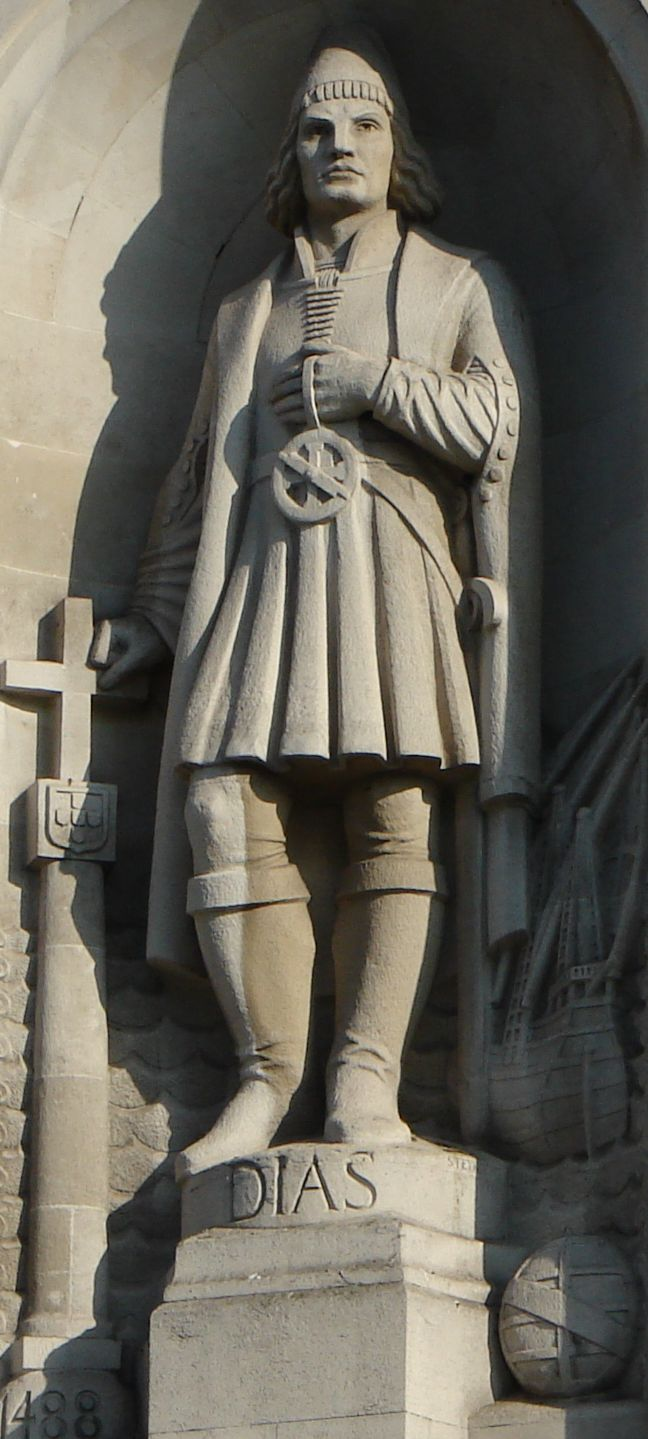
- Statue of Dias at the High Commission of South Africa in London
- Died: 29 May 1500; South Atlantic Ocean, near the Cape of Good Hope
- Other name: Bartholomew Diaz
- Occupations: Navigator and explorer
- Known for: Being the first European mariner to round the southern tip of Africa

Bartolomeu Dias (Note: /ˈdiːəs/) (d. 29 May 1500) was a Portuguese mariner and explorer. In February 1488, he became the first European navigator to round the southern tip of Africa and to demonstrate that the most effective southward route for ships is to go diagonally southwest in the open ocean, well to the west of the African coast. His discoveries were later used by Vasco da Gama to establish a sea route between Europe and Asia.

== Early life ==
Dias's family had a maritime background. One of his ancestors, Dinis Dias e Fernandes, explored the African coast in the 1440s and discovered the Cap-Vert peninsula in today's Senegal in 1445. Tracing his biography is complicated by the existence of several contemporary Portuguese seafarers with the same name.

In 1481, Dias accompanied an expedition, led by Diogo de Azambuja, to construct a fortress and trading post called São Jorge da Mina in the Gulf of Guinea.

Indirect evidence also points to his possible participation in Diogo Cão's first expedition (1482–1484), down the African coast to the Congo River.

== Voyage around Africa ==
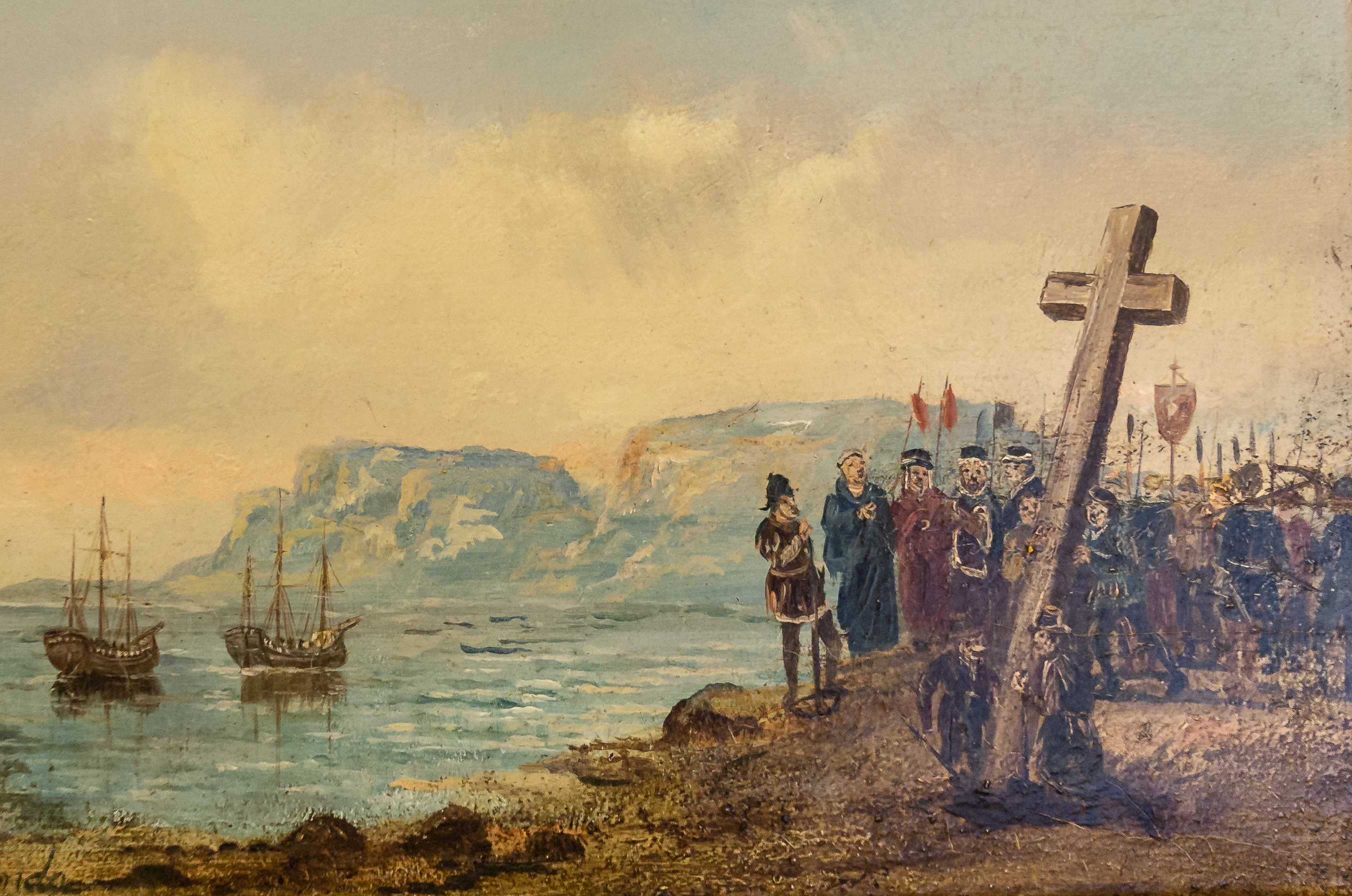
Dias erecting a padrão at the Cape of Good Hope in 1488

In 1486 he seems to have been a cavalier of the king's household and superintendent of the royal warehouses. On 10 October 1486, he received an annuity of 6,000 reis from King John II of Portugal for "services to come". Sometime after this, probably about July or August 1487, rather than July 1486, the traditional date, he left Lisbon with three ships to carry on the work of African exploration so significantly advanced by Diogo Cão.

Dias was also charged with searching for Prester John, a legendary figure believed to be the powerful Christian ruler of a realm somewhere beyond Europe, possibly in the African interior. Dias was provided with two caravels of about 50 tons each, São Cristóvão and São Pantaleão, and a square-rigged supply ship captained by his brother Diogo. He recruited some of the leading pilots of the day, including Pero de Alenquer and João de Santiago, who had previously sailed with Cão.

No contemporary documents detailing this historic voyage have been found, as almost all maritime records were destroyed in the 1755 Lisbon earthquake and ensuing tsunami. Much of the available information comes from the sixteenth-century historian João de Barros, who wrote about the voyage sixty years later.

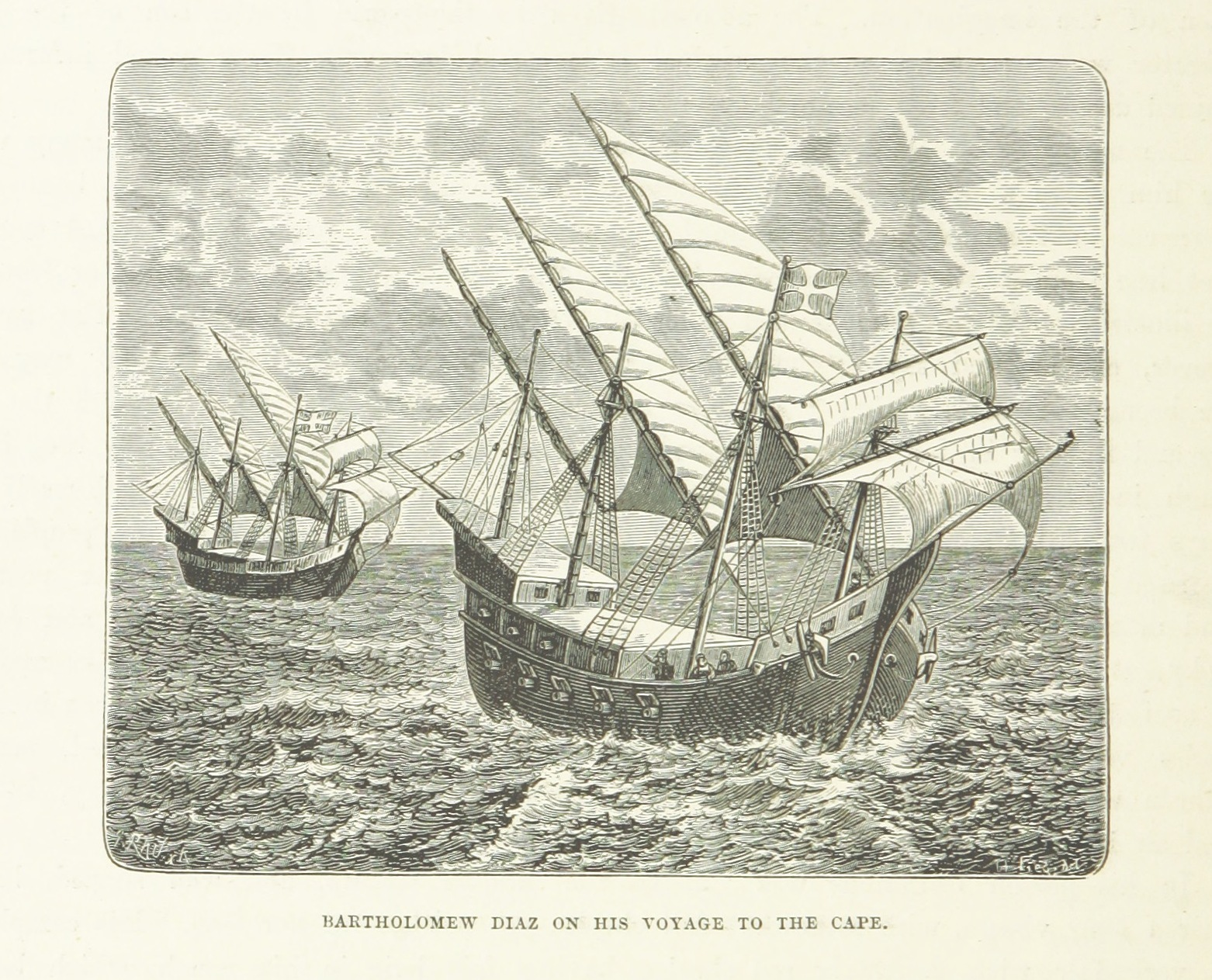
An illustration of the two caravels used by Dias, São Cristóvão and São Pantaleão, to cross the Cape of Good Hope in 1488.

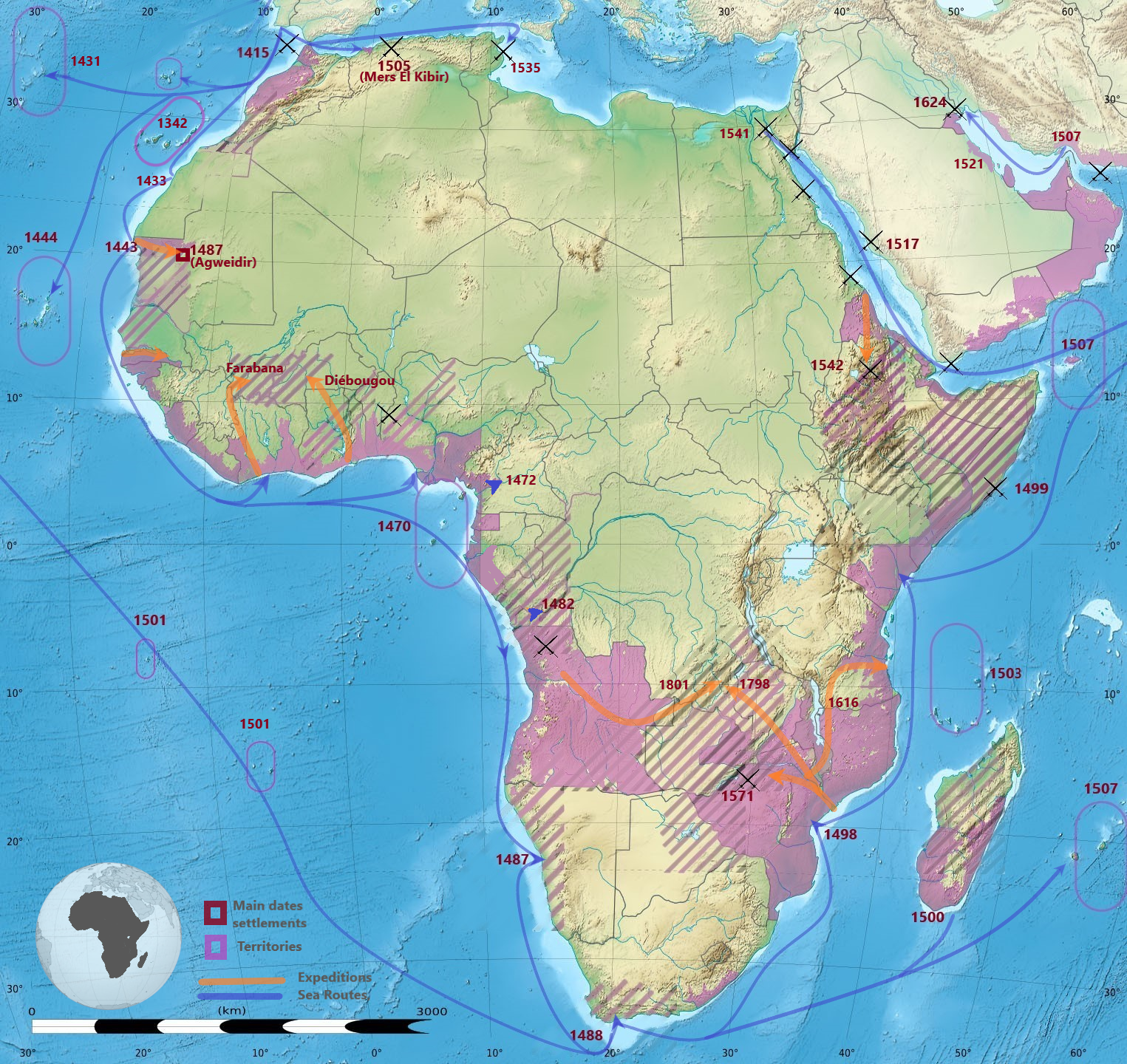
The Portuguese empire in Africa, from 1342 to 1801: routes and explorations

The small fleet left Lisbon in or around July 1487. Like his predecessor, Cão, Dias carried a set of padrões, carved stone pillars to mark his progress at significant landfalls. Also on board were six Africans who had been kidnapped by Cão and taught Portuguese. Dias planned to drop them off at various points along the African coast so that they could testify to the grandeur of the Portuguese kingdom and make inquiries into the possible whereabouts of Prester John.

The expedition sailed directly to the Congo and proceeded more carefully down the African coast, often naming notable geographic features after saints honored on the Catholic Church's calendar. When they weighed anchor at what today is Porto Alexandre, Angola, Dias left the supply ship behind so that it could re-provision them later on their return voyage. By December, Dias had passed the farthest point reached by Cão. On 8 December 1487, he arrived at the Golfo da Conceição, modern-day Walvis Bay, Namibia. After slowly progressing along the Namibian coast, the two ships turned southwest, away from land.

Historians have debated whether this happened because they were driven offshore by a storm, or because they were deliberately trying to find more favorable winds. Whatever its cause, the change of course brought them success: the ships traced a broad arc around the tip of Africa. On 4 February 1488, after 30 days on the open ocean, they reached Africa's southern cape and entered what would later become known as Mossel Bay.

The ships continued east for a time and confirmed that the coast gradually trended to the northeast. Dias realized they had accomplished Portugal's long-sought goal: rounding the southern cape of Africa. Dias's expedition reached its furthest point on 12 March 1488, when it anchored at Kwaaihoek, near the mouth of the Boesmans River—where they erected the Padrão de São Gregório. By then, the crew had become restless, urging Dias to turn around. Supplies were low, and the ships were battered.

Although Dias wanted to continue, the rest of the officers unanimously favored returning to Portugal, so he agreed to turn back. On their return voyage, they sailed close enough to Africa's southwestern coast to encounter the Cape of Good Hope for the first time in May 1488. Tradition has it that Dias originally named it the Cape of Storms (Cabo das Tormentas) and that King John II later renamed it the Cape of Good Hope (Cabo da Boa Esperança) because it symbolized the opening of a sea route from west to east.

Dias erected the last of their padrões at the cape and then headed northward. They reached their supply ship in July, after nine months of absence, and found that six of that ship's nine crew members had died in skirmishes with the natives. The vessel had become rotten with worms, so they unloaded the supplies they needed and burnt the ship on the beach. A few details about the remainder of the voyage are known. The ships made stops at Príncipe, the Rio do Resgate, in present-day Liberia, and the Portuguese trading post of São Jorge da Mina. Dias returned to Lisbon in December 1488 after an absence of 16 months.

The Dias expedition had explored a thousand more miles of the African coastline than previous expeditions had reached. It had rounded the southern tip of the continent, and it had demonstrated that the most effective southward ship route lay in the open ocean, well to the west of the African coast - a route that generations of Portuguese sailors would follow. Despite these successes, Dias's reception at court was muted. There were no official proclamations, and, at the time, Dias received little in recognition of his accomplishments.

No record has yet been found of any adequate reward for Dias. On the contrary, when the great Indian expedition was being prepared for Vasco da Gama's future leadership, Bartolomeu only superintended the building and outfit of the ships. When the fleet sailed in 1497, he only accompanied da Gama to the Cape Verde Islands, and after this was ordered to São Jorge da Mina.

== Later years and death ==
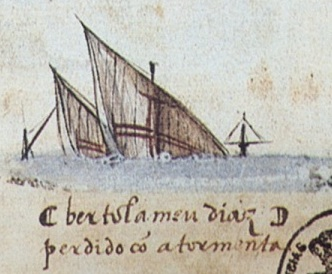
Dias perished in May 1500 when his ship was lost in a storm near the Cape of Good Hope (c. 1568 illustration).

Dias was later ennobled for his accomplishments. By 1494, he served as a squire in King John II's court. He also served as superintendent of the royal warehouses from 1494 to 1497.

Following Dias's return from his successful first voyage around Africa's southern cape, Portugal took a decade-long break from Indian Ocean exploration. King John was beset by numerous problems, including the death of his only son, a war in Morocco, and his failing health. In 1497, another voyage was commissioned, and Dias was asked to assist.

Drawing on his experience with maritime exploration, Dias contributed to the design and construction of the São Gabriel and its sister ship, the São Rafael. These were two ships that Vasco da Gama used to sail around the Cape of Good Hope and continue to India. Dias participated in the first half of da Gama's voyage but stayed behind after reaching the Cape Verde Islands.

In 1500, he was one of the captains of the second Indian expedition, headed by Pedro Álvares Cabral. This flotilla was the first to reach Brazil, landing there on 22 April 1500 before continuing east to India. Dias perished in May 1500 when captaining a ship near the Cape of Good Hope: four ships, including Dias's, encountered a massive storm off the cape and were lost on 29 May.

== Personal life ==
Dias was married and had two sons, Simão Dias de Novais and António Dias de Novais. His grandson Paulo Dias de Novais became the first governor of Portuguese Angola and, in 1576, the founder of São Paulo de Luanda.

== Legacy ==
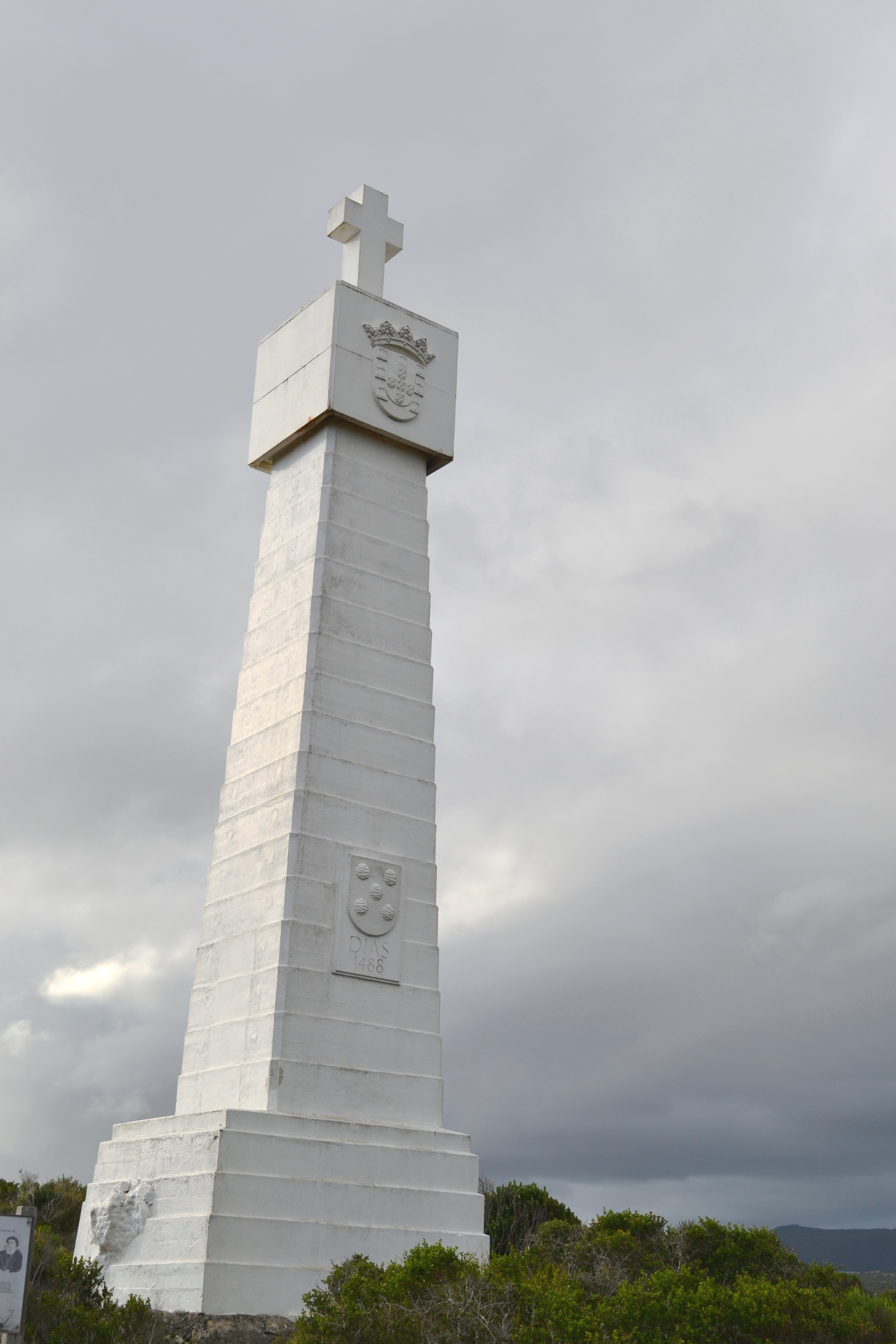
The Dias Cross at Cape Point, Western Cape

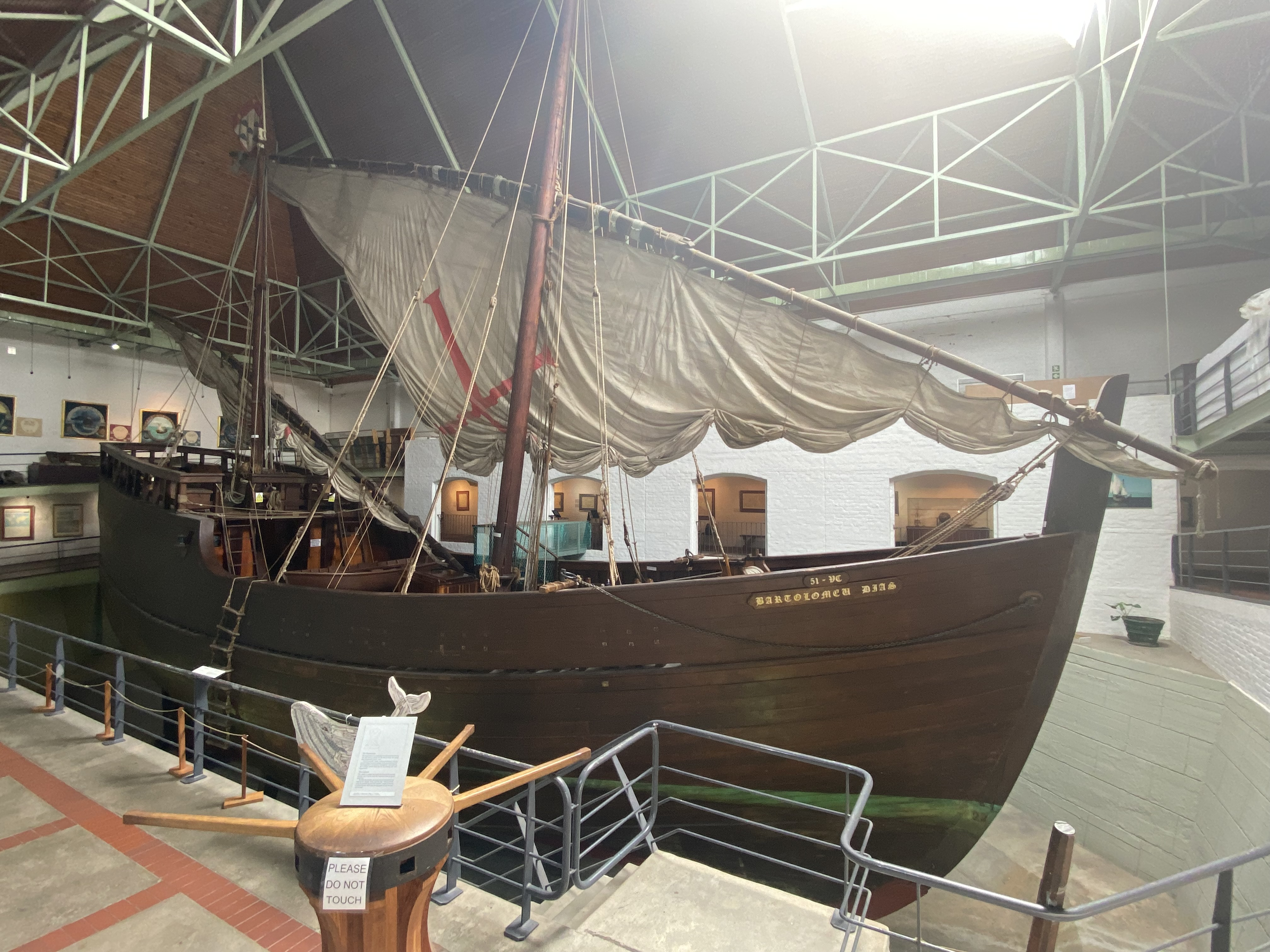
A replica of Bartolomeu Dias ship displayed in the Bartolomeu Dias Museum Complex

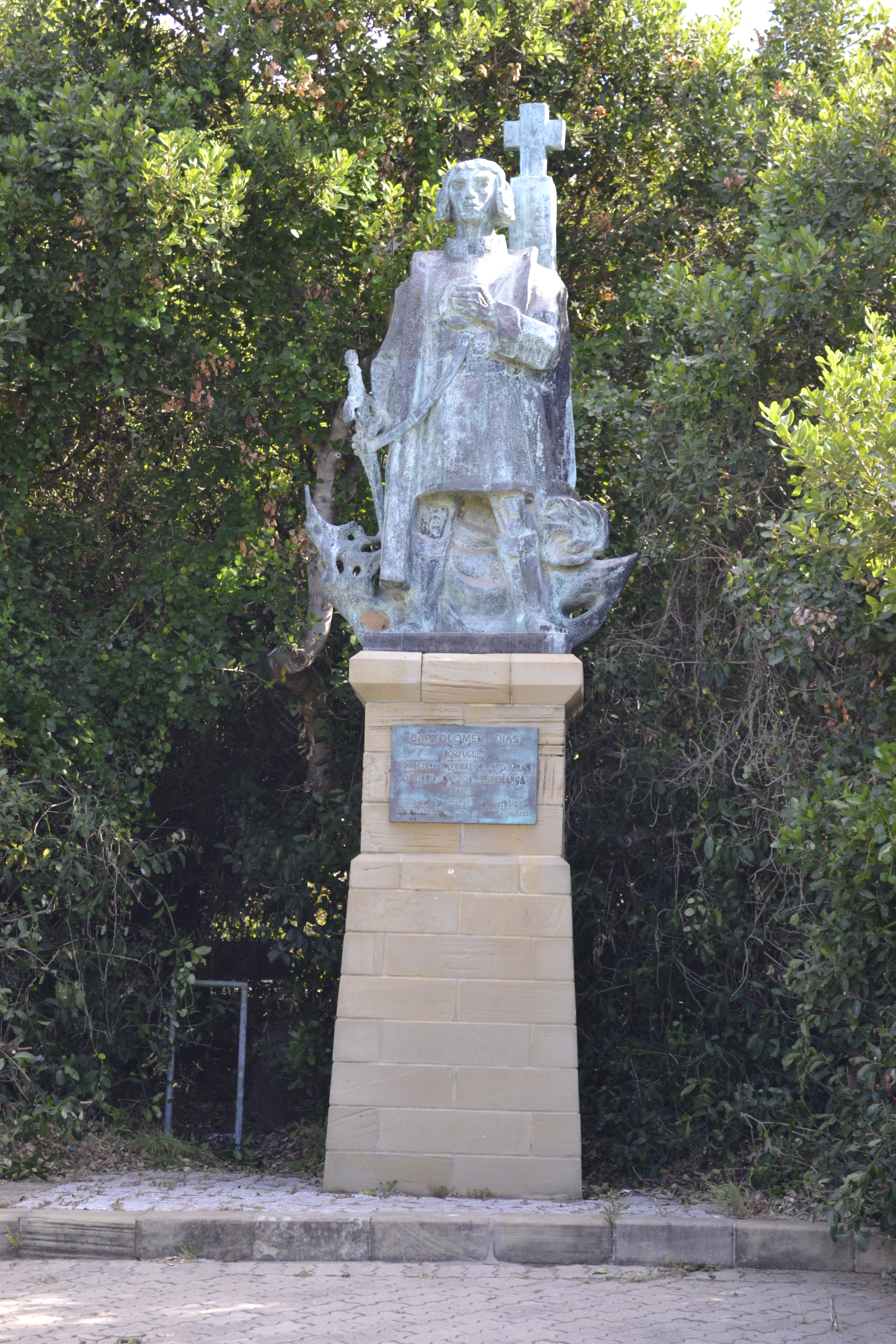
Bartolomeu Dias statue at the Bartolomeu Dias Museum Complex in Mossel Bay.

The Portuguese government erected two navigational beacons, Dias Cross and da Gama Cross, to commemorate Dias and Vasco da Gama, who were the first modern European explorers to reach the Cape of Good Hope. When lined up, these crosses point to Whittle Rock, a large, permanently submerged shipping hazard in False Bay.

The Bartolomeu Dias Museum Complex (also spelled "Bartholomeu"), located at Mossel Bay, features an exhibition displaying the history of early European sea voyagers who discovered sea routes. The local history of 19th-century artifacts and 20th-century photographs are also displayed in this building. The building houses a life-size replica of the ship Bartolomeu Dias and his crew used when they landed in Mossel Bay in 1488.

== See also ==
- Dias Cross Memorial
- Diogo Cão
- Diogo Dias

== Bibliography ==
- Campbell, Gordon (2003). The Oxford Dictionary of the Renaissance. Oxford University Press.
- Crowley, Roger (2015). Conquerors : How Portugal Forged the First Global Empire (1 ed.). New York: Random House. ISBN 978-0-8129-9400-1. OCLC 904967943.
- Dutra, Francis A. (2007). "Dias, Bartholomew". The Oxford Companion to World Exploration. Oxford University Press.
- Howgego, Raymond John, ed. (2003). "Dias, Bartolomeu". Encyclopedia of Exploration to 1800. Hordern House. ISBN 1-875567-36-4.
- Livermore, Harold V. (2021). "Bartolomeu Dias". Encyclopedia Britannica.
- Oakley, Robert (2003). "Dias, Bartolomeu". In Gerli, E. Michael (ed.). Medieval Iberia : an encyclopedia. New York: Routledge. ISBN 0-415-93918-6. OCLC 50404104.
- Ravenstein, Ernst Georg (2010). Bartolomeu Dias. William Brooks Greenlee, Pero Vaz de Caminha. England: Viartis. ISBN 978-1-906421-03-8. OCLC 501399584.
- Ravenstein, E. G. (1900). "The Voyages of Diogo Cão and Bartholomeu Dias, 1482–88". The Geographical Journal. 16 (6): 625–655. doi:10.2307/1775267. hdl:2027/mdp.39015050934820. ISSN 0016-7398. JSTOR 1775267.
