= Cannon Rocks =

- Location within Eastern Cape Location within South Africa
- Coordinates: 33°45′S 26°33′E
- Country: South Africa
- Province: Eastern Cape
- District: Sarah Baartman
- Municipality: Ndlambe

Area
  - Total: 3.12 km^{2} (1.20 sq mi)

Population (2011)
  - Total: 214
  - Density: 68.6/km^{2} (178/sq mi)

Racial makeup (2011)
  - Black African: 10.7%
  - Coloured: 0.5%
  - Indian/Asian: 0.9%
  - White: 87.9%

First languages (2011)
  - English: 52.3%
  - Afrikaans: 44.4%
  - Xhosa: 1.4%
  - Other: 1.9%
- Time zone: UTC+2 (SAST)
- PO box: 6186

Cannon Rocks is a small seaside town on the Indian Ocean in the Eastern Cape Province, South Africa, between Boknes and the boundary of the Greater Addo Elephant Park. It is situated 135 km east of Port Elizabeth and 180 km west of East London approximately 15 minutes from the town of Kenton-on-Sea. Port Alfred is approximately 40 km to the East of Cannon Rocks via the R72 Road. Cannon Rocks is part of the Ndlambe Local Municipality in the Sarah Baartman District of the Eastern Cape.

The town is named after two cannons of historical importance and is close to the Diaz cross, erected five centuries ago by Bartholomeu Diaz, the first Portuguese ocean explorer to sail along the eastern coast of South Africa.

Cannon Rocks is a major marker for weather forecasts for the coastal belt. It divides two coastal sections: Plettenberg Bay to Cannon Rocks; and Cannon Rocks to Kei Mouth.

== Weather ==
Cannon Rocks has a mild climate due to the proximity of the ocean. Average temperatures in winter will be from 13 to 20 degrees Celsius and in summer between 20 and 26 degrees celsius.https://www.worldweatheronline.com/cannon-rocks-weather-averages/eastern-cape/za.aspx The wind is moderate to strong all year round with Westerlies storms mostly in winter and Easterlies mostly in summer. Ocean temperatures depend on wind with Westerlies bringing warmer waters (average between 18 and 22 degrees Celsius) and Easterlies between 14 and 18 degrees celsius) Rainfall is spread out over the whole year but can be elusive.

== Information ==
The Cannon Rocks community elects volunteers who look after the interests of the village by means of various portfolios: Chairman, Finance/ Advertising, Public Relations, Fire Prevention/fighting, Community Affairs, Environment, Maintenance, and Infrastructure. The publish Newsletters and Minutes of meetings on the cannon rocks Website.

== Shipwreck history ==
The South African coast – especially the Cape coast – is known for its stormy weather, making it very treacherous. Many cannons and anchors have been recovered near Cannon Rocks. A combination of strong winds, unpredictable currents, freak waves and hidden shoals or reefs come together to give the coastline a hazardous reputation. In early times, the rudimentary barometers used on ships were able to give a short term weather forecast. However, there was no long-term nor predictable means of weather forecasting which meant the voyagers did not know what weather systems they were sailing in to, nor what systems were coming up behind them.

== Geology ==
There are outcrops in the sea close to Cannon Rocks of a coastal marine formation, the Salnova Formation. This formation occurs about 20 metres above sea level and comprises calcrete with quartzitic sandstone boulders and shell material.

== Activities ==
Cannon Rocks is a great kitesurfing location. The town used to host the yearly Cannon Rocks Kiteboarding Classic competition. Since dune movement encroaching on the car parking area, it has been suspended.

The major attraction is the unspoilt and uncrowded nature of the beaches, coupled to a stable and predictable south westerly and easterly wind which are both cross shore. These conditions are also enjoyed by windsurfers.

The town is a premier rock and surf angling destination. There is a charter company (Big Blue) in town that takes visitors on deep sea angling, snorkeling or scuba diving excursions.

The community hall is available for rental for local functions and get-togethers.

The nature trail is very popular. It is on the border of the SANPARKS Woody Cape/ Addo National Park. The trail, leaving from The Cannons carpark, is approx. 7 km – a 2 – 3 hour circular walk through a variety of habitats, including the beach.

There is a two-hour drive that takes visitors through the Golden Mile dairy farms on the spectacular cliffs overlooking Bird Island and the world's biggest coastal dune field. The road turns into the state forest where century old trees form a dense canopy over the road. The road ends in Alexandria, where it branches back over the mountain to Cannon Rocks.

Two hiking trails begin in Cannon Rocks. The first (7 km) starts right at the western end of town at the Cannons and winds through the bush to a look-out over the coastal dunefield. It then goes back on the beach. It is advisable to wear a sun-hat and take water.

The second trail is a two-day trail that can be booked through the Addo Elephant Park offices.

== Economy ==
Cannon Rocks is close to an area called "The Golden Mile" of dairy farming. It is a strip of land between the sea and the Woody Cape forest that is very well suited to dairy farming. This historically drove the development of the area. Recent price collusion between major milk-buying companies Clover, Parmalat and Woodlands have left the once prosperous farmers facing bleak futures, with herds reduced and many farmers opting for beef cattle.

The economy of Cannon Rocks is primarily retirement housing, holiday houses and weekend visitors. The beaches are immaculately clean and safe due to the very low number of visitors and the fact that there is approximately 100 km of untouched bush and beaches to the west. Since the pandemic started in 2020 there has been an influx of early retirement and laptop class workers who are able to work remotely and fulfill their work duties online. These include engineers, information technology, and entrepreneurs equipped with computer and internet connection.

Cannon Rocks does not have a retail outlet and residents and visitors buy basic commodities in Boknesstrand or Kenton-on-Sea. Basically the only commercial activity is the Post Office Agency and convenience shop for essential snacks and food items. Kenton-on-Sea also provides several banks and associated commercial activities. One local established restaurant and bar called Roes caters for daily meals and get togethers. The local resident artisan baker specializing in Ciabatta provides fresh artisan bread weekly to locals and the surrounding area.
