= Boknesstrand =

- Location within Eastern Cape Location within South Africa
- Coordinates: 33°43′S 26°34′E
- Country: South Africa
- Province: Eastern Cape
- District: Sarah Baartman
- Municipality: Ndlambe

Area
  - Total: 1.57 km^{2} (0.61 sq mi)

Population (2011)
  - Total: 318
  - Density: 203/km^{2} (525/sq mi)

Racial makeup (2011)
  - Black African: 2.5%
  - Coloured: 1.9%
  - Indian/Asian: 0.3%
  - White: 92.1%
  - Other: 3.1%

First languages (2011)
  - Afrikaans: 74.1%
  - English: 24.0%
  - Other: 1.9%
- Time zone: UTC+2 (SAST)
- PO box: 6189
- Area code: 046

Boknesstrand (or Boknes) is a small seaside town in the Eastern Cape of South Africa. It is close to Cannon Rocks, Kenton-on-Sea, Alexandria, Bushman's River Mouth and Port Alfred. It is part of the Ndlambe Local Municipality in the Sarah Baartman District of the Eastern Cape.

Village 19 km south-east of Alexandria, at the mouth of the Boknes River, from which it takes its name. Formerly called Jammerfontein. The name Boknes is derived from Khoekhoen and means 'father's river'. The forms Bocna, Bokana etc. are also encountered.
