= Boesmans River (Eastern Cape) =

River in the Eastern Cape, South Africa

- Location of the Boesman's River mouth
- Native name: Qhorha (Xhosa)

Location
- Country: South Africa
- Province: Eastern Cape
- Towns: Kenton-on-Sea

Physical characteristics
- Source
  - location: North of Kirkwood, Eastern Cape, South Africa
- Mouth: Indian Ocean
  - location: Kenton-on-Sea, Eastern Cape, South Africa
  - coordinates: 33.6906°S 26.6645°E
  - elevation: 0 m (0 ft)
- Length: 230 km (140 mi)
- Basin size: 2,670 km^{2} (1,030 sq mi)
- Discharge
  - location: Kenton-on-Sea

Boesmans River (Afrikaans: Boesmansrivier) is a river in the Eastern Cape, South Africa. It originates north of Kirkwood and runs east past Alicedale, before it turns and twists south and east to Kenton-on-Sea, where it mouths into the Indian Ocean through a tidal estuary only 1.7 km to the SW of the mouth of the Kariega River.

== Tributaries ==
Its tributaries include: Bega River, iCamtarha, Ncazala River, Komga River, New Years River, Steins River, Swartwaters River, Soutkloof River and Bou River.

== See also ==
- List of rivers of South Africa
- Bushman's River Mouth
