= Platythomisus jubbi =

Jubbi's Platythomisus Crab Spider

Scientific classification
- Kingdom: Animalia
- Phylum: Arthropoda
- Subphylum: Chelicerata
- Class: Arachnida
- Order: Araneae
- Infraorder: Araneomorphae
- Family: Thomisidae
- Genus: Platythomisus
- Species: P. jubbi

Binomial name
- Platythomisus jubbi Lawrence, 1968

Species of spider

Platythomisus jubbi is a species of spider in the family Thomisidae. It is endemic to South Africa and is commonly known as Jubbi's Platythomisus crab spider.

== Distribution ==
Platythomisus jubbi is found only in South Africa, where it is known from the Eastern Cape, KwaZulu-Natal, Limpopo, and Mpumalanga.

Notable locations include Kenton-on-Sea, Bathurst, Ndumo Game Reserve, Vernon Crookes Nature Reserve, iSimangaliso Wetland Park, Hoedspruit, and Kruger National Park.

== Habitat and ecology ==
Platythomisus jubbi inhabits the Savanna and Thicket biomes at altitudes ranging from 5 to 1279 m.

They are free-living on plants. Specimens have been found in silk retreats.

== Conservation ==
Platythomisus jubbi is listed as Least Concern by the South African National Biodiversity Institute. The species has a wide geographical range, though more sampling is needed to collect the male. It is protected in Ndumo Game Reserve, Vernon Crookes Nature Reserve, and Kruger National Park.

== Taxonomy ==
The species was originally described by Lawrence in 1968 from Kenton-on-Sea in the Eastern Cape. Only the female is known.
