= Ndlambe Local Municipality elections =

Local elections in the Eastern Cape, South Africa

The Ndlambe Local Municipality council consists of twenty members elected by mixed-member proportional representation. Ten councillors are elected by first-past-the-post voting in ten wards, while the remaining ten are chosen from party lists so that the total number of party representatives is proportional to the number of votes received.

In the election of 4 November 2026 the African National Congress (ANC) lost its majority, but won a plurality of nine seats.

== Results ==
The following table shows the composition of the council after past elections.

Event	ANC	DA	EFF	Other	Total
2000 election	13	4	—	0	17
2006 election	14	4	—	0	18
2011 election	13	6	—	1	20
2016 election	13	6	1	0	20
2021 election	11	6	3	0	20
2026 election	9	7	1	3	20

== December 2000 election ==
The following table shows the results of the 2000 election.

Party	Ward			List			Total seats
Party	Votes	%	Seats	Votes	%	Seats	Total seats
African National Congress	12,374	74.61	7	12,556	75.56	6	13
Democratic Alliance	3,555	21.43	2	3,480	20.94	2	4
African Christian Democratic Party	469	2.83	0	312	1.88	0	0
United Democratic Movement	188	1.13	0	269	1.62	0	0
Total	16,586	100.00	9	16,617	100.00	8	17
Valid votes	16,586	98.30		16,617	98.50		
Invalid/blank votes	287	1.70		253	1.50		
Total votes	16,873	100.00		16,870	100.00		
Registered voters/turnout	26,668	63.27		26,668	63.26		

== March 2006 election ==
The following table shows the results of the 2006 election.

Party	Ward			List			Total seats
Party	Votes	%	Seats	Votes	%	Seats	Total seats
African National Congress	14,446	77.81	8	14,391	77.58	6	14
Democratic Alliance	3,642	19.62	1	3,679	19.83	3	4
African Christian Democratic Party	477	2.57	0	479	2.58	0	0
Total	18,565	100.00	9	18,549	100.00	9	18
Valid votes	18,565	98.92		18,549	98.86		
Invalid/blank votes	202	1.08		213	1.14		
Total votes	18,767	100.00		18,762	100.00		
Registered voters/turnout	29,895	62.78		29,895	62.76		

== May 2011 election ==
The following table shows the results of the 2011 election.

Party	Ward			List			Total seats
Party	Votes	%	Seats	Votes	%	Seats	Total seats
African National Congress	14,168	65.97	8	14,481	68.91	5	13
Democratic Alliance	6,016	28.01	1	6,533	31.09	5	6
Independent candidates	1,294	6.02	1				1
Total	21,478	100.00	10	21,014	100.00	10	20
Valid votes	21,478	98.11		21,014	96.20		
Invalid/blank votes	414	1.89		831	3.80		
Total votes	21,892	100.00		21,845	100.00		
Registered voters/turnout	32,532	67.29		32,532	67.15		

== August 2016 election ==
The following table shows the results of the 2016 election.

Party	Ward			List			Total seats
Party	Votes	%	Seats	Votes	%	Seats	Total seats
African National Congress	13,818	62.05	9	13,870	62.33	4	13
Democratic Alliance	6,823	30.64	1	6,885	30.94	5	6
Economic Freedom Fighters	464	2.08	0	601	2.70	1	1
Independent candidates	725	3.26	0				0
United Democratic Movement	121	0.54	0	600	2.70	0	0
African Christian Democratic Party	319	1.43	0	296	1.33	0	0
Total	22,270	100.00	10	22,252	100.00	10	20
Valid votes	22,270	98.94		22,252	99.00		
Invalid/blank votes	238	1.06		224	1.00		
Total votes	22,508	100.00		22,476	100.00		
Registered voters/turnout	34,455	65.33		34,455	65.23		

== November 2021 election ==
The following table shows the results of the 2021 election.

Party	Ward			List			Total seats
Party	Votes	%	Seats	Votes	%	Seats	Total seats
African National Congress	9,602	52.66	8	9,545	52.55	3	11
Democratic Alliance	5,519	30.27	2	5,501	30.29	4	6
Economic Freedom Fighters	2,658	14.58	0	2,688	14.80	3	3
African Christian Democratic Party	424	2.33	0	378	2.08	0	0
African Transformation Movement	30	0.16	0	51	0.28	0	0
Total	18,233	100.00	10	18,163	100.00	10	20
Valid votes	18,233	98.89		18,163	98.51		
Invalid/blank votes	205	1.11		275	1.49		
Total votes	18,438	100.00		18,438	100.00		
Registered voters/turnout	33,201	55.53		33,201	55.53		

== November 2026 election ==
The following table shows the results of the 2026 election.

Party	Ward			List			Total seats
Party	Votes	%	Seats	Votes	%	Seats	Total seats
African National Congress	9,891	43.34	7	9,832	42.83	2	9
Democratic Alliance	8,027	35.18	3	8,045	35.04	4	7
Thina Bahlali People's Movement	2,335	10.23	0	2,548	11.10	2	2
Economic Freedom Fighters	736	3.23	0	721	3.14	1	1
Freedom Front Plus	598	2.62	0	599	2.61	1	1
Patriotic Alliance	315	1.38	0	287	1.25	0	0
uMkhonto weSizwe Party	295	1.29	0	291	1.27	0	0
Ndlambe Citizens Movement	267	1.17	0	270	1.18	0	0
African Christian Democratic Party	148	0.65	0	146	0.64	0	0
African Transformation Movement	62	0.27	0	96	0.42	0	0
South African Communist Party	60	0.26	0	68	0.30	0	0
Afrika Mayibuye Movement	62	0.27	0	36	0.16	0	0
Organic Humanity Movement	24	0.11	0	18	0.08	0	0
Total	22,820	100.00	10	22,957	100.00	10	20
Valid votes	22,820	99.15		22,957	99.18		
Invalid/blank votes	195	0.85		190	0.82		
Total votes	23,015	100.00		23,147	100.00		
Registered voters/turnout	37,779	60.92		37,779	61.27		
