= Kasouga =

- Location within Eastern Cape Location within South Africa
- Coordinates: 33.647°S 26.736°E
- Country: South Africa
- Province: Eastern Cape
- District: Sarah Baartman
- Municipality: Ndlambe

Area
  - Total: 1.51 km^{2} (0.58 sq mi)

Population (2011)
  - Total: 39
  - Density: 26/km^{2} (67/sq mi)

Racial makeup (2011)
  - Black African: 5.1%
  - White: 94.9%

First languages (2011)
  - English: 92.3%
  - Afrikaans: 5.1%
  - Other: 2.6%
- Time zone: UTC+2 (SAST)

Kasouga or Kasuka is a small village in Sarah Baartman District Municipality in the Eastern Cape province of South Africa.

Settlement some 10 km north-east of Kenton-on-Sea, near the mouth of the Kasuka River. The name is derived from Khoekhoen and means 'place of many leopards'. The river name "Kasuka" is a Xhosa adaptation of the word, and has the same meaning.
