= Dutch Reformed Church, Uitenhage =

Church in Uitenhage, South Africa

Dutch Reformed Church
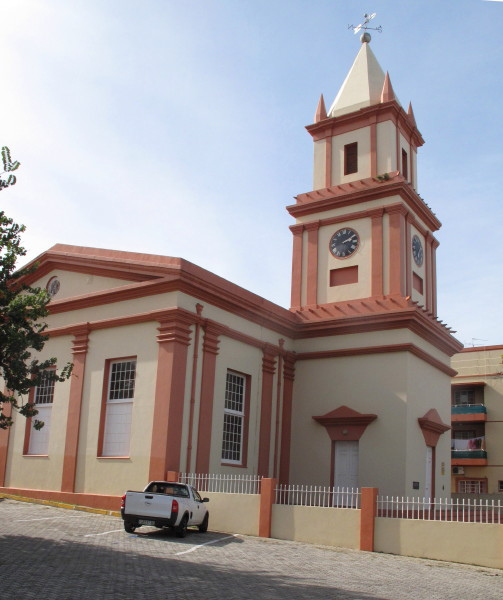
- Uitenhage's old church.
- Location: Uitenhage
- Country: South Africa
- Denomination: Nederduits Gereformeerde Kerk

History
- Founded: 1817

Architecture
- Functional status: Church

The Dutch Reformed Church in Uitenhage, is the 10th oldest Dutch Reformed Church in South Africa and the second oldest in the Eastern Cape, has the distinction of being the first and only congregation of the Dutch Reformed Church from which three congregations split off on one day when on 22 June 1950, during an extraordinary Presbyterian meeting in the mother church, it was decided to split off Uitenhage-Noord,-Oos and -De Mist. This already brought the total number of daughter congregations of the mother congregation, which was founded in 1817 as the tenth congregation in South Africa, to 21.

== Background ==
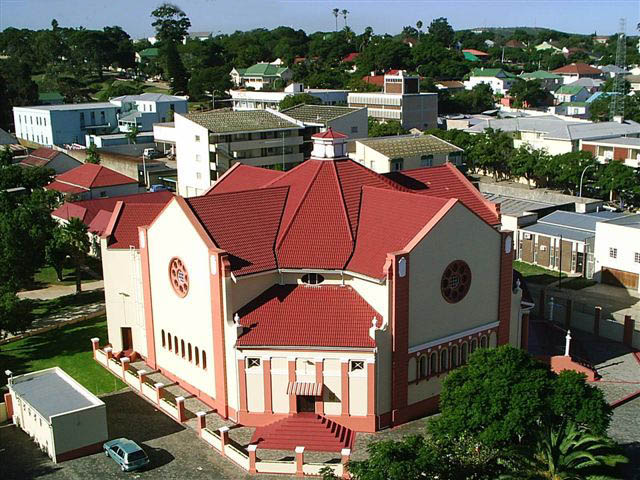
The current Dutch Reformed mother church in Uitenhage.

Early in 1804, the field cornets in which the most restless burghers lived and which also suffered the most during raids by the neighbouring Xhosas, were cut off from the Graaff-Reinet district and proclaimed a separate drostdy. It received the family name of Mr. J.A. Uitenhage de Mist, commissioner-general during the rule of the Batavian Republic. Already in 1809 there was a movement among the settlers to have their own church and it was therefore certainly a memorable event when for the first time in June 1816 church council members for Uitenhage were approved by the governor on the recommendation of the magistrate. A so-called church house already stood there. Uitenhage could also be provided with a pastor in the person of Rev. Cornelis Mol who was an Afrikaner by birth. In 1823 Rev. Mol, for some reason or another and without officially saying goodbye, left Uitenhage and became minister of Swellendam in October of the same year.

== Ministers ==
- Cornelis Mol, 1817 - 1823
- Alexander Smith, 1823 - 1863 (after whom Alexandria was named; died on 13 August 1864)
- Abraham Isaac Steytler, 1863 - 1881
- Jan Hendrik Hofmeyr, 1882 - 1887 (expelled; died 22 March 1924)
- Daniël Jozua Pienaar, 1887 - 8 March 1926 (died in office)
- Antonie Johannes Troskie, 1926 - 14 June 1932 (died in office)
- Paul Marais van Heerden, 1932 - 1944
- Jacobus Stephanus Gericke, 1938 - 1944
- Ockert Almero Cloete, 1944 - 1947
- Willem Johannes Lubbe, 1944 - 1948
- Jacobus Johannes Badenhorst, 1946 - 1948
- Pieter Combrink, 1948 - 1950 (then first pastor of daughter congregation Uitenhage-Noord)
- Petrus Jacobus Johannes Stephanus Els, 1949 - 1950 (then first pastor of daughter congregation Uitenhage-Oos)
- William Fullard, 1949 - 1950 (then first pastor of daughter congregation Uitenhage-De Mist)
- Wessel Charles Oswald du Toit, 1951 - 1953
- Coenraad Hendrik Lourens Mouton, 1951 - 1956
- Edward Ellis, 1954 - 1963
- Johannes Samuel Loots, 1955 - 1961
- Johannes Abraham Vollgraaff Knipe, 1957 - 1958
- Ockert Johannes Erasmus, 1963 - 1969
- Edward Botha - 1963 - 1965
- Petrus Johannes de Vries, 1972 - 1976
- Daniël Jacobus Malan, 1975 - 1979
- Izak Daniël Wilhelm Bosman, 1981 - 1985
