= Trappe's Valley =

Trappes Valley
- Location within Eastern Cape Location within South Africa
- Coordinates: 33.445°S 26.890°E
- Country: South Africa
- Province: Eastern Cape
- District: Sarah Baartman
- Municipality: Ndlambe
- Time zone: UTC+2 (SAST)

Trappes Valley is a settlement about 10 km north-east of Bathurst. Named after Captain Charles Trappes who was Second in Command of the 72nd Regiment at Grahamstown in 1819. He was the founder of Bathurst and Provisional Magistrate in 1820.
