= 2010 Under-21 Provincial Championship Group B =

Provincial Championship Group B

- Countries: South Africa
- Date: 6 August – 15 October 2010
- Champions: Falcons U21
- Runners-up: Eastern Province U21
- Promoted: Falcons U21
- Matches played: 24
- Tries scored: 191 (average 8 per match)
- Top point scorer: Neil Jansen van Rensburg (111)
- Top try scorer: Roland Syphus (10)

The 2010 Under-21 Provincial Championship Group B was contested from 6 August to 15 October 2010. The tournament (also known as the ABSA Under-21 Provincial Championship for sponsorship reasons) was the second tier of 2010 edition of the Under-21 Provincial Championship, an annual Under-21 inter-provincial rugby union competition featuring fourteen South African provincial unions.

The tournament was won by Falcons U21; they beat Eastern Province U21 53–36 in the final played on 15 October 2010. They were also promoted to Group A for 2011.

== Competition rules and information ==
There were seven participating teams in the 2010 Under-21 Provincial Championship Group B. These teams played each other once over the course of the season, either at home or away.

Teams received four points for a win and two points for a draw. Bonus points were awarded to teams that scored four or more tries in a game, as well as to teams that lost a match by seven points or less. Teams were ranked by log points, then points difference (points scored less points conceded).

The top four teams qualified for the title play-off semi-finals. The team that finished first had home advantage against the team that finished fourth, while the team that finished second had home advantage against the team that finished third. The final would be played as a curtain raiser for the 2010 Currie Cup First Division final.

The team that finished top of Group B had to play in a promotion play-off against the bottom team of Group A for a place in the 2011 Under-21 Provincial Championship Group A.

== Teams ==
Location of teams in the 2010 Under-21 Provincial Championship Group B

The following teams took part in the 2010 Under-21 Provincial Championship Group B competition:

2010 Under-21 Provincial Championship Group B teams
Team Name	Stadium
Border U21	Buffalo City Stadium, East London
Eastern Province U21	Nelson Mandela Bay Stadium, Port Elizabeth
Falcons U21	Barnard Stadium, Kempton Park
Griffons U21	North West Stadium, Welkom
Griquas U21	Griqua Park, Kimberley
Pumas U21	Mbombela Stadium, Mbombela
SWD U21	Outeniqua Park, George

== Standings ==
The final league standings for the 2010 Under-21 Provincial Championship Group B were:

2010 Under-21 Provincial Championship Group B standings
Pos	Team	P	W	D	L	PF	PA	PD	TF	TA	TB	LB	Pts
1	Eastern Province U21	6	5	1	0	241	134	+107	32	14	4	0	26
2	Griffons U21	6	4	2	0	216	138	+78	31	15	5	0	25
3	Falcons U21	6	3	1	2	249	146	+103	31	19	4	1	19
4	Pumas U21	6	3	0	3	215	166	+49	23	21	3	2	17
5	Griquas U21	6	2	0	4	152	199	−47	19	25	3	1	12
6	Border U21	6	1	0	5	110	273	−163	15	38	2	0	6
7	SWD U21	6	1	0	5	92	219	−127	12	31	0	0	4

Legend and competition rules
Legend:
Top four teams qualify to the semi-finals.	P = Games played, W = Games won, D = Games drawn, L = Games lost, PF = Points for, PA = Points against, PD = Points difference, TF = Tries For, TA = Tries Against, TB = Try bonus points, LB = Losing bonus points, Pts = Log points
Competition rules:
Play-offs: The top four teams qualify to the semi-finals, with the higher-placed team having home advantage. The title winner qualify to the promotion play-off, playing away from home against the bottom team from Group A. Points breakdown: * 4 points for a win * 2 points for a draw * 1 bonus point for a loss by seven points or less * 1 bonus point for scoring four or more tries in a match

=== Round-by-round ===
The table below shows each team's progression throughout the season. For each round, their cumulative points total is shown with the overall log position in brackets:

Team Progression – 2010 Under-21 Provincial Championship Group B
Team	R1	R2	R3	R4	R5	R6	R7	R8	R9	Semi	Final
Eastern Province U21	4 (2nd)	4 (3rd)	4 (4th)	9 (1st)	12 (1st)	12 (2nd)	16 (2nd)	21 (1st)	26 (1st)	Won	Lost
Griffons U21	—N/a	5 (1st)	5 (2nd)	7 (2nd)	10 (2nd)	15 (1st)	20 (1st)	20 (2nd)	25 (2nd)	Lost	—N/a
Falcons U21	—N/a	—N/a	0 (6th)	2 (6th)	7 (3rd)	8 (4th)	9 (5th)	14 (4th)	19 (3rd)	Won	Won
Pumas U21	1 (3rd)	1 (4th)	1 (5th)	6 (3rd)	6 (5th)	11 (3rd)	11 (4th)	16 (3rd)	17 (4th)	Lost	—N/a
Griquas U21	1 (4th)	1 (5th)	6 (1st)	6 (4th)	7 (4th)	7 (5th)	12 (3rd)	12 (5th)	12 (5th)	—N/a	—N/a
Border U21	4 (1st)	4 (2nd)	4 (3rd)	4 (5th)	4 (6th)	4 (6th)	5 (6th)	6 (6th)	6 (6th)	—N/a	—N/a
SWD U21	—N/a	—N/a	0 (7th)	0 (7th)	4 (7th)	4 (7th)	4 (7th)	4 (7th)	4 (7th)	—N/a	—N/a
Key:	win	draw	loss	bye							

== Fixtures ==
The following matches were played in the 2010 Under-21 Provincial Championship Group B:

- All times are South African (GMT+2).

=== Round one ===
6 August 2010	Border U21	15–11	Griquas U21	Buffalo City Stadium, East London
17:00	Try: Sino Nyoka 23', 46'; Con: Justin Warren Kopke 47' (1/2); Pen: Justin Warren Kopke 57' (1/1); Cards: Brett Andrew Allam (yellow card) 34' to 45'	Scoreboard	Try: Rudi Britz 35'; Con: Kevin Plaatjies (0/1); Pen: Kevin Plaatjies 2', 5' (2/5); Cards: Adriaan Micheal Opperman (yellow card) 56' to 66'	Attendance: 500; Referee: Tiaan Jonker

7 August 2010	Eastern Province U21	23–21	Pumas U21	Nelson Mandela Bay Stadium, Port Elizabeth
13:30	Try: Masixole Banda 51'; Vusumzi Dyantjies 64'; Samuel Borsah 77'; Con: Masixole Banda 52' (1/2); Curtis Isaac Sias (0/1); Pen: Carl Roux van Niekerk 19', 28' (2/2); Masixole Banda (0/2); Cards: Werner Kapp (yellow card) 3' to 15'; Thabiso Lucky Mngomezulu (yellow card) 39' to 50'; Vusumzi Dyantjies (yellow card) 68'	Scoreboard	Try: Neil Jansen van Rensburg 37'; Zane Bert Sloane 69'; Con: Neil Jansen van Rensburg 38' (1/2); Pen: Neil Jansen van Rensburg 5', 21', 71' (3/8)	Referee: Archie Sehlako

Bye/s: Falcons U21, Griffons U21, SWD U21

=== Round two ===
13 August 2010	Griffons U21	29–10	Griquas U21	North West Stadium, Welkom
15:00	Try: Arno Visagie 11'; Grant Janke 35'; Divandré Strydom 41'; Herbert Burger 50'; Con: Tiaan van Wyk 12', 36', 51' (3/4); Pen: Tiaan van Wyk 60' (1/3); Drop: Tiaan van Wyk (0/1); Cards: Boetie Groenewald (yellow card) 69'; Leon Johannes Kruger (yellow card) 76'	Scoreboard	Try: Hendrik Beets 75'; Con: Kevin Plaatjies 76' (1/1); Pen: Kevin Plaatjies 7' (1/1)	Referee: Pieter de Villiers

Bye/s: Border U21, Eastern Province U21, Falcons U21, Pumas U21, SWD U21

=== Round three ===
20 August 2010	SWD U21	27–43	Griquas U21	Outeniqua Park, George
16:30	Try: Johannes Hendrik van Wyk 30'; Reginald Emmanuel Kleinbooi 60'; Layle Delo 68'; Con: Henn-Lin Jacobus Botha 31', 61', 68' (3/3); Pen: Henn-Lin Jacobus Botha 1', 9' (2/2)	Scoreboard	Try: Etienne Luwayne Swarts 39'; Lwandile Garry Makibi 42'; Kevin Plaatjies 44', 64', 72'; David Jacobus Strauss 51'; Con: Kevin Plaatjies 40' (1/1); Sarel Leon Pretorius 42', 44', 52' (3/4); Irlon Joran April 72' (1/1); Pen: Kevin Plaatjies 75' (1/3); Sarel Leon Pretorius (0/2)	Attendance: 1,000; Referee: Matt Kemp

Bye/s: Border U21, Eastern Province U21, Falcons U21, Griffons U21, Pumas U21

=== Round four ===
27 August 2010	Pumas U21	40–10	SWD U21	Mbombela Stadium, Mbombela
16:40	Try: Neels Pienaar 14'; Quentin Posthumus 44'; Ruan Grobler 54'; Raymond van Niekerk 79'; Con: Neil Jansen van Rensburg 15', 45', 55', 80' (4/4); Pen: Neil Jansen van Rensburg 7', 31' (2/3); Drop: Neil Jansen van Rensburg 16', 63' (2/2)	Scoreboard	Try: Layle Delo 34'; Con: Henn-Lin Jacobus Botha 35' (1/1); Pen: Henn-Lin Jacobus Botha 2' (1/2)	Referee: Quinton Immelman

27 August 2010	Eastern Province U21	35–18	Border U21	Nelson Mandela Bay Stadium, Port Elizabeth
17:00	Try: Curtis Isaac Sias 5'; Athenkosi Manentsa 51'; Yondela Stampu 59'; Thembelani Bholi 70'; Con: Curtis Isaac Sias 52', 60', 71' (3/4); Pen: Curtis Isaac Sias 30', 33', 43' (3/5); Cards: Thabiso Lucky Mngomezulu (yellow card) 64' to 73'	Scoreboard	Try: Saneliso Ngoma 17'; Lukhanyo Siyobo 25'; Con: Justin Warren Kopke 18' (1/2); Pen: Justin Warren Kopke (0/1); Byron McGuigan 45', 63' (2/2); Cards: John Rohlandt (yellow card) 33' to 41'; Juan Schwarz (yellow card) 42' to 52'	Attendance: 700; Referee: Francois Veldsman

28 August 2010	Falcons U21	25–25	Griffons U21	Barnard Stadium, Kempton Park
12:50	Try: Jurgens Lambrechts 52'; Con: Charl Nieuwenhuis 53' (1/1); Pen: Charl Nieuwenhuis 1', 11', 17', 32', 77' (5/6); Drop: Charl Nieuwenhuis 27' (1/1); Cards: Andrew Gower (yellow card) 57' to 67'	Scoreboard	Try: Grant Janke 29', 68', 72'; Con: Tiaan van Wyk 30', 69' (2/3); Pen: Tiaan van Wyk 57', 83' (2/4)	Attendance: 1,000; Referee: Lusanda Jam

Bye/s: Griquas U21

=== Round five ===
3 September 2010	Griffons U21	36–36	Eastern Province U21	North West Stadium, Welkom
15:00	Try: Donavan Ball 13'; Christiano Divan Swarts 24'; Heinrich Roelfse 48'; Boetie Groenewald 59'; Con: Tiaan van Wyk 49', 60' (2/4); Pen: Tiaan van Wyk 6', 12', 39', 69' (4/4); Drop: Tiaan van Wyk (0/1); Cards: Donavan Ball (yellow card) 50' to 60'; Christiano Divan Swarts (yellow card) 66' to 76'	Scoreboard	Try: Yondela Stampu 8', 46'; Gladman Lulama Mdzoyi 63' penalty try 67'; Con: Curtis Isaac Sias 68' (1/3); Werner Kapp 47' (1/1); Pen: Morné van Staden (0/1); Curtis Isaac Sias 28', 34', 43', 71' (4/5)	Referee: Mlungiseleli Mdashe

3 September 2010	Border U21	10–18	SWD U21	Buffalo City Stadium, East London
17:00	Try: Brett Andrew Allam 57'; Con: Byron McGuigan (0/1); Pen: Byron McGuigan 20', 39' (2/2); Cards: John Rohlandt (yellow card) 36' to 47'; Luzuko Nyabaza (yellow card) 68' to 78'	Scoreboard	Try: Anton Beswick 12'; Stephanus Johannes Engelbrecht 67'; Con: Cedrick Ryneveldt 13' (1/1); Raynor Becker (0/1); Pen: Raynor Becker 53' (1/4); Cedrick Ryneveldt 17' (1/2); Jason Horne (0/1)	Attendance: 500; Referee: Ben Crouse

4 September 2010	Griquas U21	26–51	Falcons U21	Griqua Park, Kimberley
18:00	Try: Schalk Willem van der Merwe 19'; Lundi Ralarala 28', 78'; Sarel Leon Pretorius 74'; Con: Kevin Plaatjies (0/2); Sarel Leon Pretorius (0/2); Pen: Kevin Plaatjies 1', 9' (2/2); Sarel Leon Pretorius (0/1); Cards: Byron Booysen (yellow card) 18' to 28'; George Tzorvas (yellow card) 39' to 49'; Antonie Theo Vosloo (yellow card) 52' to 62'	Scoreboard	Try: Michael Nienaber 15', 31'; Bertus van der Merwe 21'; Frederick Nicolaas Johannes Kalp 55'; Roland Syphus 58'; Willem Peterus Meyer 60'; Felix Gondo 77'; Con: Charl Nieuwenhuis 16', 32', 55', 59' (4/6); Dillon Laubscher 77' (1/1); Pen: Charl Nieuwenhuis 37' (1/4); Drop: Charl Nieuwenhuis 8' (1/1); Cards: Hannes Ludik (yellow card) 18' to 28'; Gerhard Venter (yellow card) 68' to 78'	Referee: Francois Veldsman

Bye/s: Pumas U21

=== Round six ===
10 September 2010	Pumas U21	44–35	Falcons U21	Puma Stadium, Witbank
15:00	Try: Lambertus Nicolaas Potgieter 27'; Dewald Pieters 35', 37'; Zane Bert Sloane 71'; Theunis Kruger 76'; Con: Neil Jansen van Rensburg 28', 36', 38', 72', 77' (5/5); Pen: Neil Jansen van Rensburg 5', 40', 68' (3/4); Drop: Neil Jansen van Rensburg (0/1)	Scoreboard	Try: Roland Syphus 17', 45'; Michael Nienaber 21', 66'; Con: Charl Nieuwenhuis 18', 22', 67' (3/4); Pen: Charl Nieuwenhuis 1', 16', 31' (3/6)	Referee: Matt Kemp

10 September 2010	SWD U21	12–20	Griffons U21	Outeniqua Park, George
17:00	Try: Layle Delo 42'; Raynor Becker 74'; Con: Henn-Lin Jacobus Botha 43' (1/2); Pen: Henn-Lin Jacobus Botha (0/2); Cards: Ryno Scheepers (yellow card) 80'	Scoreboard	Try: Juan-Leonard Wilson 8'; Grant Janke 22'; Boetie Groenewald 53'; Wesley Leonard Botes 68'; Con: Juan-Leonard Wilson (0/1); Christiano Divan Swarts (0/1); Leon Johannes Kruger (0/2); Pen: Christiano Divan Swarts (0/1); Cards: Arno Visagie (yellow card) 18' to 29'; Wernich Botha (yellow card) 74'; Dalton van Loggorenberg (yellow card) 79'	Attendance: 1,000; Referee: Archie Sehlako

Bye/s: Border U21, Eastern Province U21, Griquas U21

=== Round seven ===
17 September 2010	Falcons U21	22–26	Eastern Province U21	Barnard Stadium, Kempton Park
12:45	Try: Gerhard Venter 24'; Con: Charl Nieuwenhuis 25' (1/1); Pen: Charl Nieuwenhuis 4', 13', 27', 44', 71' (5/6); Cards: Johannes Petrus Roodt (yellow card) 66' to 77'	Scoreboard	Try: Samuel Borsah 34'; Morné van Staden 68'; Gladman Lulama Mdzoyi 70'; Con: Masixole Banda 71' (1/3); Pen: Masixole Banda 21', 57', 74' (3/4); Drop: Morné van Staden (0/1); Cards: Ferdi Gerber (yellow card) 71'	Attendance: 500; Referee: Luke Burger

17 September 2010	Griquas U21	37–29	Pumas U21	Griqua Park, Kimberley
16:30	Try: Lwandile Garry Makibi 39'; Irlon Joran April 44'; Lundi Ralarala 52', 74'; Con: Kevin Plaatjies 40', 46', 53', 75' (4/4); Pen: Kevin Plaatjies 6', 61', 67' (3/4); Cards: Byron Booysen (yellow card) 54' to 64'	Scoreboard	Try: Johann Tromp 26'; Wayne Dreyer 59'; Con: Neil Jansen van Rensburg 26' (1/1); Adriaan Isak Vosloo 60' (1/1); Pen: Neil Jansen van Rensburg 2', 16', 38', 50', 55' (5/6); Cards: Roelf Fritz (yellow card) 73'	Referee: Pieter de Villiers

18 September 2010	Griffons U21	73–27	Border U21	North West Stadium, Welkom
15:00	Try: Donavan Ball 4', 60'; Daniel Viljoen 16'; Divandré Strydom 22', 46'; Rupert Cronjé 36'; Leon Johannes Kruger 39'; Jan Petrus Oosthuizen 54'; Grant Janke 68'; Hendrik Christiaan Prinsloo 71'; Johan Matthysen 77'; Con: Leon Johannes Kruger 5', 17', 23', 40', 47', 55', 61', 72' (8/10); Jacques Wilson 78' (1/1); Pen: Leon Johannes Kruger (0/1)	Scoreboard	Try: Kyle Mark Theron 29'; Luzuko Nyabaza 58'; Simthembile Cakwe 65'; Kyle Edwards 79'; Con: Byron McGuigan 59' (1/2); Justin Warren Kopke 66' (1/1); Luvuyo Ngemntu (0/1); Pen: Byron McGuigan 35' (1/1); Cards: Nkosikona Solimo (yellow card) 75'	Attendance: 400; Referee: Rasta Rasivhenge

Bye/s: SWD U21

=== Round eight ===
24 September 2010	SWD U21	13–33	Falcons U21	Outeniqua Park, George
15:00	Try: Raynor Becker 46'; Arden-Lee Wesso 67'; Con: Raynor Becker (0/1); Jannie Deon Geyer (0/1); Pen: Raynor Becker 31' (1/3); Cards: Reginald Emmanuel Kleinbooi (yellow card) 78'	Scoreboard	Try: Roland Syphus 17'; Bruce Muller 50'; Michael Nienaber 62'; Johan Gerhardus van Niekerk 71'; Anton van Deventer 76'; Con: Dillon Laubscher 51' (1/5); Pen: Dillon Laubscher 40', 48' (2/2); Cards: Barend Steyn (yellow card) 33' to 43'; Andrew Gower (yellow card) 64' to 74'; Bruce Muller (yellow card) 78'	Attendance: 1,000; Referee: Rasta Rasivhenge

24 September 2010	Border U21	28–53	Pumas U21	Buffalo City Stadium, East London
17:00	Try: Lukhanyo Siyobo 7'; Kyle Edwards 70'; Billy Dutton 74'; Simthembile Cakwe 79'; Con: Byron McGuigan (0/3); Justin Warren Kopke 75' (1/1); Pen: Byron McGuigan 31', 54' (2/3); Cards: Billy Dutton (yellow card) 25' to 35'; Onke Dubase (yellow card) 28' to 38'	Scoreboard	Try: Jean-Di Oosthuysen 16'; Johann Tromp 36', 43'; Zane Bert Sloane 48', 58'; Lambertus Nicolaas Potgieter 51'; Dewald Pieters 61'; Con: Neil Jansen van Rensburg 17', 37', 49', 52', 62' (5/5); Johann Tromp (0/1); Gerhardus Christiaan Pretorius 59' (1/1); Pen: Neil Jansen van Rensburg 10' (1/1); Drop: Neil Jansen van Rensburg 78' (1/1); Cards: Zane Bert Sloane (yellow card) 74'	Attendance: 500; Referee: Dilbert November

25 September 2010	Griquas U21	25–48	Eastern Province U21	Griqua Park, Kimberley
16:00	Try: Russell van Wyk 47'; George Tzorvas 55'; Etienne Luwayne Swarts 65'; Con: Kevin Plaatjies 56', 65' (2/3); Pen: Kevin Plaatjies 2', 27' (2/2); Cards: Byron Booysen (yellow card) 12' to 22'; David Jacobus Strauss (yellow card) 32' to 42'	Scoreboard	Try: Masixole Banda 13'; Zwelakhe Sodladla 19'; Thabiso Lucky Mngomezulu 38'; Dewald Barnard 43'; Vusumzi Dyantjies 50'; Athenkosi Manentsa 56'; Thembelani Bholi 79'; Con: Masixole Banda 14', 20', 39', 57' (4/5); Morné van Staden (0/1); Curtis Isaac Sias 80' (1/1); Pen: Curtis Isaac Sias 70' (1/1); Cards: Thabiso Lucky Mngomezulu (yellow card) 3' to 13'	Attendance: 100; Referee: Mlungiseleli Mdashe

Bye/s: Griffons U21

=== Round nine ===
1 October 2010	Eastern Province U21	73–12	SWD U21	Nelson Mandela Bay Stadium, Port Elizabeth
16:30	Try: Gladman Lulama Mdzoyi 3', 72'; Athenkosi Manentsa 10'; Zwelakhe Sodladla 24'; Morné van Staden 27'; Samuel Borsah 35', 65'; Werner Kapp 51'; Yondela Stampu 58'; Kalvano King 78', 80'; Con: Masixole Banda (0/1); Morné van Staden 11', 25', 28', 36', 59', 66', 73', 79', 81' (9/10); Pen: Masixole Banda (0/1)	Scoreboard	Try: Enrico Treurnicht 13'; Francois Kemp 30'; Con: Henn-Lin Jacobus Botha 14' (1/2); Pen: Henn-Lin Jacobus Botha (0/1); Drop: Vogan Lourens (0/1)	Attendance: 2,000; Referee: Ben Crouse

2 October 2010	Falcons U21	83–12	Border U21	Puma Stadium, Witbank
13:00	Try: Franco Marais 11'; Johannes Radebe 22', 68'; Roland Syphus 23', 33', 39'; Ruaan Coetzee 26'; André Nel 35', 41'; Paseka Moloi 56', 65'; Bruce Muller 60'; Hannes Ludik 70'; Con: Dillon Laubscher 12', 24', 27', 34', 36', 61', 69', 71' (8/12); Roland Syphus 66' (1/1); Cards: Bertus van der Merwe (yellow card) 46' to 56'; Johan Gerhardus van Niekerk (yellow card) 46' to 56'	Scoreboard	Try: Sino Nyoka 46'; Byron McGuigan 54'; Con: Byron McGuigan 47' (1/1); Sino Nyoka (0/1); Pen: Byron McGuigan (0/2); Justin Warren Kopke (0/1)	Attendance: 300; Referee: Francois Groenewald

2 October 2010	Pumas U21	28–33	Griffons U21	Puma Stadium, Witbank
13:00	Try: Zane Bert Sloane 55'; Quentin Posthumus 62'; Johann Tromp 66'; Con: Neil Jansen van Rensburg 56', 63' (2/3); Pen: Neil Jansen van Rensburg 33', 47', 51' (3/4); Drop: Neil Jansen van Rensburg (0/1); Cards: Zane Bert Sloane (yellow card) 42' to 52'	Scoreboard	Try: Hendrik Christiaan Prinsloo 17'; Grant Janke 23', 28'; Boetie Groenewald 44'; Donavan Ball 64'; Con: Leon Johannes Kruger 24', 29', 45', 65' (4/5); Pen: Leon Johannes Kruger (0/1)	Attendance: 100; Referee: Quinton Immelman

Bye/s: Griquas U21

=== Semi-finals ===
9 October 2010	Griffons U21	22–36	Falcons U21	North West Stadium, Welkom
15:00	Try: Grant Janke 6'; Divandré Strydom 48'; Virgil Russel 69'; Arno Visagie 81'; Con: Leon Johannes Kruger (0/3); Christiano Divan Swarts 82' (1/1); Drop: Leon Johannes Kruger (0/1)	Scoreboard	Try: Michael Nienaber 15', 79'; Pieter Lubbe 18'; Roland Syphus 20', 25'; Con: Dillon Laubscher 16', 19', 21', 80' (4/5); Pen: Dillon Laubscher 51' (1/2)	Attendance: 200; Referee: Dilbert November

9 October 2010	Eastern Province U21	43–20	Pumas U21	Nelson Mandela Bay Stadium, Port Elizabeth
16:30	Try: Siyanda Grey 21'; Athenkosi Manentsa 26', 41'; Dewald Barnard 70'; Masixole Banda 74'; Kalvano King 79'; Con: Curtis Isaac Sias 41', 80' (2/5); Morné van Staden (0/1); Pen: Curtis Isaac Sias 14', 36', 57' (3/3); Cards: Wade Lotter (yellow card) 32' to 40'; Daniel du Preez Grobler (yellow card) 76'	Scoreboard	Try: Pieter Strydom 34'; Dewald Pieters 73'; Con: Neil Jansen van Rensburg 35', 74' (2/2); Pen: Neil Jansen van Rensburg 44' (1/3); Drop: Neil Jansen van Rensburg 4' (1/1); Cards: Raymond van Niekerk (yellow card) 31' to 40'	Attendance: 2,000; Referee: Francois Veldsman

=== Final ===
15 October 2010	Eastern Province U21	36–53	Falcons U21	Outeniqua Park, George
16:30	Try: Reynier van Rooyen 12', 30'; Curtis Isaac Sias 52'; Morné van Staden 59'; Siyanda Grey 72'; Con: Curtis Isaac Sias 13', 31', 53', 73' (4/5); Pen: Curtis Isaac Sias 29' (1/1); Cards: Zwelakhe Sodladla (yellow card) 34' to 44'	Scoreboard	Try: Michael Nienaber 14', 78'; Roland Syphus 27'; Ruaan Coetzee 37'; Anton van Deventer 44'; Sihle Mtwa 46'; Con: Dillon Laubscher 15', 28', 38', 79' (4/6); Pen: Dillon Laubscher 8', 24', 35', 40', 55' (5/6)	Attendance: 3,500; Referee: Matt Kemp

== Honours ==
The honour roll for the 2010 Under-21 Provincial Championship Group B was as follows:

2010 Under-21 Provincial Championship Group B Honours
Champions:	Falcons U21
Top Try Scorer:	Roland Syphus, Falcons U21 (10)
Top Points Scorer:	Neil Jansen van Rensburg, Pumas U21 (111)

== Players ==
=== Player statistics ===
The following table contain points which were scored in the 2010 Under-21 Provincial Championship Group B:

All point scorers
No	Player	Team	T	C	P	DG	Pts
1	Neil Jansen van Rensburg	Pumas U21	1	20	18	4	111
2	Curtis Isaac Sias	Eastern Province U21	2	11	12	0	68
3	Charl Nieuwenhuis	Falcons U21	0	9	14	2	66
4	Kevin Plaatjies	Griquas U21	3	8	11	0	64
5	Dillon Laubscher	Falcons U21	0	18	8	0	60
6	Roland Syphus	Falcons U21	10	1	0	0	52
7	Grant Janke	Griffons U21	9	0	0	0	45
7	Michael Nienaber	Falcons U21	9	0	0	0	45
9	Masixole Banda	Eastern Province U21	3	6	3	0	36
10	Tiaan van Wyk	Griffons U21	0	7	7	0	35
11	Morné van Staden	Eastern Province U21	3	9	0	0	33
12	Byron McGuigan	Border U21	1	2	7	0	30
13	Leon Johannes Kruger	Griffons U21	1	12	0	0	29
14	Athenkosi Manentsa	Eastern Province U21	5	0	0	0	25
14	Zane Bert Sloane	Pumas U21	5	0	0	0	25
16	Henn-Lin Jacobus Botha	SWD U21	0	6	3	0	21
17	Donavan Ball	Griffons U21	4	0	0	0	20
17	Samuel Borsah	Eastern Province U21	4	0	0	0	20
17	Gladman Lulama Mdzoyi	Eastern Province U21	4	0	0	0	20
17	Dewald Pieters	Pumas U21	4	0	0	0	20
17	Lundi Ralarala	Griquas U21	4	0	0	0	20
17	Yondela Stampu	Eastern Province U21	4	0	0	0	20
17	Divandré Strydom	Griffons U21	4	0	0	0	20
17	Johann Tromp	Pumas U21	4	0	0	0	20
25	Raynor Becker	SWD U21	2	0	2	0	16
26	Layle Delo	SWD U21	3	0	0	0	15
26	Boetie Groenewald	Griffons U21	3	0	0	0	15
26	Kalvano King	Eastern Province U21	3	0	0	0	15
26	Sino Nyoka	Border U21	3	0	0	0	15
30	Justin Warren Kopke	Border U21	0	4	1	0	11
30	Sarel Leon Pretorius	Griquas U21	1	3	0	0	11
32	Dewald Barnard	Eastern Province U21	2	0	0	0	10
32	Thembelani Bholi	Eastern Province U21	2	0	0	0	10
32	Simthembile Cakwe	Border U21	2	0	0	0	10
32	Ruaan Coetzee	Falcons U21	2	0	0	0	10
32	Vusumzi Dyantjies	Eastern Province U21	2	0	0	0	10
32	Kyle Edwards	Border U21	2	0	0	0	10
32	Siyanda Grey	Eastern Province U21	2	0	0	0	10
32	Lwandile Garry Makibi	Griquas U21	2	0	0	0	10
32	Paseka Moloi	Falcons U21	2	0	0	0	10
32	Bruce Muller	Falcons U21	2	0	0	0	10
32	André Nel	Falcons U21	2	0	0	0	10
32	Quentin Posthumus	Pumas U21	2	0	0	0	10
32	Lambertus Nicolaas Potgieter	Pumas U21	2	0	0	0	10
32	Hendrik Christiaan Prinsloo	Griffons U21	2	0	0	0	10
32	Johannes Radebe	Falcons U21	2	0	0	0	10
32	Lukhanyo Siyobo	Border U21	2	0	0	0	10
32	Zwelakhe Sodladla	Eastern Province U21	2	0	0	0	10
32	Etienne Luwayne Swarts	Griquas U21	2	0	0	0	10
32	Anton van Deventer	Falcons U21	2	0	0	0	10
32	Reynier van Rooyen	Eastern Province U21	2	0	0	0	10
32	Arno Visagie	Griffons U21	2	0	0	0	10
53	Irlon Joran April	Griquas U21	1	1	0	0	7
53	Werner Kapp	Eastern Province U21	1	1	0	0	7
53	Christiano Divan Swarts	Griffons U21	1	1	0	0	7
56	Carl Roux van Niekerk	Eastern Province U21	0	0	2	0	6
57	Brett Andrew Allam	Border U21	1	0	0	0	5
57	Hendrik Beets	Griquas U21	1	0	0	0	5
57	Anton Beswick	SWD U21	1	0	0	0	5
57	Wesley Leonard Botes	Griffons U21	1	0	0	0	5
57	Rudi Britz	Griquas U21	1	0	0	0	5
57	Herbert Burger	Griffons U21	1	0	0	0	5
57	Rupert Cronjé	Griffons U21	1	0	0	0	5
57	Wayne Dreyer	Pumas U21	1	0	0	0	5
57	Billy Dutton	Border U21	1	0	0	0	5
57	Stephanus Johannes Engelbrecht	SWD U21	1	0	0	0	5
57	Felix Gondo	Falcons U21	1	0	0	0	5
57	Ruan Grobler	Pumas U21	1	0	0	0	5
57	Frederick Nicolaas Johannes Kalp	Falcons U21	1	0	0	0	5
57	Francois Kemp	SWD U21	1	0	0	0	5
57	Reginald Emmanuel Kleinbooi	SWD U21	1	0	0	0	5
57	Theunis Kruger	Pumas U21	1	0	0	0	5
57	Jurgens Lambrechts	Falcons U21	1	0	0	0	5
57	Pieter Lubbe	Falcons U21	1	0	0	0	5
57	Hannes Ludik	Falcons U21	1	0	0	0	5
57	Franco Marais	Falcons U21	1	0	0	0	5
57	Johan Matthysen	Griffons U21	1	0	0	0	5
57	Willem Peterus Meyer	Falcons U21	1	0	0	0	5
57	Thabiso Lucky Mngomezulu	Eastern Province U21	1	0	0	0	5
57	Sihle Mtwa	Falcons U21	1	0	0	0	5
57	Saneliso Ngoma	Border U21	1	0	0	0	5
57	Luzuko Nyabaza	Border U21	1	0	0	0	5
57	Jan Petrus Oosthuizen	Griffons U21	1	0	0	0	5
57	Jean-Di Oosthuysen	Pumas U21	1	0	0	0	5
57	Neels Pienaar	Pumas U21	1	0	0	0	5
57	Heinrich Roelfse	Griffons U21	1	0	0	0	5
57	Virgil Russel	Griffons U21	1	0	0	0	5
57	Cedrick Ryneveldt	SWD U21	0	1	1	0	5
57	David Jacobus Strauss	Griquas U21	1	0	0	0	5
57	Pieter Strydom	Pumas U21	1	0	0	0	5
57	Kyle Mark Theron	Border U21	1	0	0	0	5
57	Enrico Treurnicht	SWD U21	1	0	0	0	5
57	George Tzorvas	Griquas U21	1	0	0	0	5
57	Bertus van der Merwe	Falcons U21	1	0	0	0	5
57	Schalk Willem van der Merwe	Griquas U21	1	0	0	0	5
57	Johan Gerhardus van Niekerk	Falcons U21	1	0	0	0	5
57	Raymond van Niekerk	Pumas U21	1	0	0	0	5
57	Johannes Hendrik van Wyk	SWD U21	1	0	0	0	5
57	Russell van Wyk	Griquas U21	1	0	0	0	5
57	Gerhard Venter	Falcons U21	1	0	0	0	5
57	Daniel Viljoen	Griffons U21	1	0	0	0	5
57	Arden-Lee Wesso	SWD U21	1	0	0	0	5
57	Juan-Leonard Wilson	Griffons U21	1	0	0	0	5
104	Gerhardus Christiaan Pretorius	Pumas U21	0	1	0	0	2
104	Adriaan Isak Vosloo	Pumas U21	0	1	0	0	2
104	Jacques Wilson	Griffons U21	0	1	0	0	2
—	penalty try	Eastern Province U21	1	0	0	0	5
* Legend: T = Tries, C = Conversions, P = Penalties, DG = Drop Goals, Pts = Points.

=== Squad lists ===
The teams released the following squad lists:

2010 Border U21 squad
Forwards

Brett Andrew Allam • Onke Dubase • Billy Dutton • Odwa Gxamza • Zukisani Gxokwana • Peter Gerald Jackson • Ramon Shadley Jewell • Abonga Makapela • Xola Mapapu • Luvuyo Ngemntu • Luzuko Nyabaza • Frederik Petrus Potgieter • Wandile Putuma • John Rohlandt • Juan Schwarz • Lukhanyo Siyobo • Nkosikona Solimo • Wynand Wagenaar

Backs

Simthembile Cakwe • Kyle Edwards • Okuhlo Joyi • Justin Warren Kopke • Lwando Makhongolo • Leon Andrew Mauer • Byron McGuigan • Saneliso Ngoma • Sino Nyoka • Kyle Mark Theron • Garneth Francois van Rayner • Garth van Rayner

Did not play

Masomelele Lali

2010 Eastern Province U21 squad
Forwards

Zingisa April • Dewald Barnard • Thembelani Bholi • Samuel Borsah • Christie Henderson Dicks • Ronald Ferreira • Keenan Rodney Frieslaar • Ferdi Gerber • Christiaan Hermanus Grobler • Daniel du Preez Grobler • Werner Kapp • Wade Lotter • Athenkosi Manentsa • Thabiso Lucky Mngomezulu • George Frederick Rademan • Wade James Stuurman

Backs

Masixole Banda • Vusumzi Dyantjies • Siyanda Grey • Kalvano King • Benjamin Koeberg • Gladman Lulama Mdzoyi • Corné Nortjé • Curtis Isaac Sias • Zwelakhe Sodladla • Yondela Stampu • Carl Roux van Niekerk • Reynier van Rooyen • Morné van Staden

Did not play

Blake Arthur Atherton • Riaan Bayman • Rynier Bernardo • Morne Steven Blignault • Enrico Heinrich Booysen • Bejamin Howard-Edward Brukman • Philippus Frederick Du Piesanie • Wessel Christian Ebersohn • Johan Schoeman Engelbrecht • Nathan Fick • Ashwen Prakash Lalla-Kooverjee • Dylan Oliver Love • Christiaan Conrad Rademan • Leon Smith • James Dan Symington • Warren Hudson van der Riet • Bron-Lee Viviers • Jean-Claude Wagener

2010 Falcons U21 squad
Forwards
Backs

Andrew Gower • Frederick Nicolaas Johannes Kalp • Pieter Lubbe • Hannes Ludik • Mduduzi Angellicus Madondo • Franco Marais • Willem Peterus Meyer • Sihle Mtwa • Bruce Muller • Arno Nel • Coenie Nolte • Johannes Petrus Roodt • Barend Steyn • Bertus van der Merwe • Anton van Deventer • Boris van Jaarsveld • Johan Gerhardus van Niekerk

Pieter Hendrik Coetzee • Ruaan Coetzee • Neill Michael Erasmus • Felix Gondo • Marno Kotzee • Jurgens Lambrechts • Dillon Laubscher • Thabo Given Mokhema • Paseka Moloi • André Nel • Michael Nienaber • Charl Nieuwenhuis • Johannes Radebe • Marius Armand Robbertse • Roland Syphus • Gerhard Venter • Tesner Junayn Williams

2010 Griffons U21 squad
Forwards

Donavan Ball • Charles Leonard Barnard • Wesley Leonard Botes • Wernich Botha • Herbert Burger • Gavin du Plessis • Boetie Groenewald • Gerhard Klopper • Frank Mateus • Heinrich Roelfse • Jacques Francois Steyn • Dewald Trytsman • Chris van der Linde • Dalton van Loggorenberg • Daniel Viljoen • Arno Visagie

Backs

Darren Colby • Rupert Cronjé • Egan Gysman • Grant Janke • Leon Johannes Kruger • Johan Matthysen • Ossie Nortjé • Jan Petrus Oosthuizen • Hendrik Christiaan Prinsloo • Virgil Russel • Nhlanqamiso Sibanda • Divandré Strydom • Christiano Divan Swarts • Tiaan van Wyk • Jacques Wilson • Juan-Leonard Wilson

Did not play

Julio Mauricio da Silva • Dean Kouprianoff • Riaan Liang

2010 Griquas U21 squad
Forwards

Gerard Baard • Hendrik Beets • Byron Booysen • Rudi Britz • Roderick Dalton • Leon Kilian • John Nel Lintvelt • Lwandile Garry Makibi • Shaun McGeer • Adriaan Micheal Opperman • Marinus Pretorius • Johannes Bernadus Raubenheimer • Friedle Lindley September • George Tzorvas • Anthone Christian Verhoog • Antonie Theo Vosloo • Gillaume Jacobus Wolvaardt • Tiaan Moranville Young

Backs

Irlon Joran April • Shaun Albert Blignaut • Rozario Ferenzo Fourie • Kyle Mervyn Hans • Nathen-niel Cresendo Jafta • Vince Reiner Minnaar Ducasonn Hates Olyn • Kevin Plaatjies • Sarel Leon Pretorius • Lundi Ralarala • David Jacobus Strauss • Etienne Luwayne Swarts • Hendrik Jacobus van der Merwe • Schalk Willem van der Merwe • Russell van Wyk

Did not play

Johannes Jacobus Bekker • Juan Daniel de Bruin • Byron Andrew Koenze • Ntsikelelo Blessing Mabusela • Henry Lourens Rossouw • André Jacobus van der Walt

2010 Pumas U21 squad
Forwards

John-Henry Carstens • Henco Dickason • Ruan Grobler • Joel Hlatywayo • Terence Long • Mzwandile Prescott Mahlangu • Ewald Maré • Ricardo Wane Menezes • Willie Muller • Jean-Di Oosthuysen • Neels Pienaar • Quentin Posthumus • Gerhardus Christiaan Pretorius • Reinard Pretorius • Brendan Rams • Phillip Range • Zane Bert Sloane • Harry van Eck • Raymond van Niekerk • Kewan Voysey

Backs

Wayne Dreyer • Roelf Fritz • Felix Godlo • Neil Jansen van Rensburg • Anrich Kruger • Devan Kruger • Theunis Kruger • Jaco Parsons • Franco Pearson • Dewald Pieters • Lambertus Nicolaas Potgieter • Morné Smit • Pieter Strydom • Johann Tromp • André van der Walt • Adriaan Isak Vosloo

Did not play

Siphesihle Yondela Barnabas • John-Wessel Bell • Etiene Bouwer • Johann Hendrik De Bruin • Paul Petrus du Plessis • Joost Heystek • Neoi Jeffrey Maliehe • Leon Lee Oosthuizen • Johannes Bernadus Raubenheimer • Keith Ross Trytsman • Heinrich van Noordwyk • Arthur William Williams

2010 SWD U21 squad
Forwards

Marshel Abrahams • Denzil Garth April • Zander Bekker • Luvan Cass • Eurecian Mark Daniels • Layle Delo • Gavin James Delport • Theunis Dercksen • Christo du Plessis • Stephanus Johannes Engelbrecht • Daniël Elardus Erasmus • Etienne Janse van Rensburg • Francois Kemp • Bradley Earl Ruiters • Ryno Scheepers • Marius van Dorp • Johannes Hendrik van Wyk • Arden-Lee Wesso

Backs

Phaezzle Bremmond August • Raynor Becker • Anton Beswick • Henn-Lin Jacobus Botha • Charlie Ewerts • Merlin Geswindt • Jannie Deon Geyer • Jason Horne • Reginald Emmanuel Kleinbooi • Vogan Lourens • Rudi Michaels • Cedrick Ryneveldt • Emile Temperman • Enrico Treurnicht • Divan van Zyl

Did not play

Jaco Fourie • Enzo Demain Matthews • Sinclair Ibrahim McClean • Daniel Cornelius Roberts • Jacobus Schroder • Charwin Shane van Wyk •

=== Discipline ===
The following table contains all the cards handed out during the tournament:

Cards
Player	Team	Sent off (straight red)	Temporarily suspended
Byron Booysen	Griquas U21	0	3
Thabiso Lucky Mngomezulu	Eastern Province U21	0	3
Andrew Gower	Valke U21	0	2
John Rohlandt	Border U21	0	2
Zane Bert Sloane	Pumas U21	0	2
Brett Andrew Allam	Border U21	0	1
Donavan Ball	Griffons U21	0	1
Wernich Botha	Griffons U21	0	1
Onke Dubase	Border U21	0	1
Billy Dutton	Border U21	0	1
Vusumzi Dyantjies	Eastern Province U21	0	1
Roelf Fritz	Pumas U21	0	1
Ferdi Gerber	Eastern Province U21	0	1
Daniel du Preez Grobler	Eastern Province U21	0	1
Boetie Groenewald	Griffons U21	0	1
Werner Kapp	Eastern Province U21	0	1
Reginald Emmanuel Kleinbooi	SWD U21	0	1
Leon Johannes Kruger	Griffons U21	0	1
Wade Lotter	Eastern Province U21	0	1
Hannes Ludik	Valke U21	0	1
Bruce Muller	Valke U21	0	1
Luzuko Nyabaza	Border U21	0	1
Adriaan Micheal Opperman	Griquas U21	0	1
Johannes Petrus Roodt	Valke U21	0	1
Ryno Scheepers	SWD U21	0	1
Juan Schwarz	Border U21	0	1
Zwelakhe Sodladla	Eastern Province U21	0	1
Nkosikona Solimo	Border U21	0	1
Barend Steyn	Valke U21	0	1
David Jacobus Strauss	Griquas U21	0	1
Christiano Divan Swarts	Griffons U21	0	1
George Tzorvas	Griquas U21	0	1
Bertus van der Merwe	Valke U21	0	1
Dalton van Loggorenberg	Griffons U21	0	1
Johan Gerhardus van Niekerk	Valke U21	0	1
Raymond van Niekerk	Pumas U21	0	1
Gerhard Venter	Valke U21	0	1
Arno Visagie	Griffons U21	0	1
Antonie Theo Vosloo	Griquas U21	0	1
* Legend: (red card) = Sent off, (yellow card) = Sin-binned

== Referees ==
The following referees officiated matches in the 2010 Under-21 Provincial Championship Group B:

2010 Under-21 Provincial Championship Group B Referees
Referees

Luke Burger • Ben Crouse • Pieter de Villiers • Francois Groenewald • Quinton Immelman • Lusanda Jam • Tiaan Jonker • Matt Kemp • Mlungiseleli Mdashe • Dilbert November • Rasta Rasivhenge • Archie Sehlako • Francois Veldsman

== See also ==
- Currie Cup
- 2010 Currie Cup Premier Division
- 2010 Currie Cup First Division
