= Boetie Groenewald =

South African rugby union player

- Full name: Wilmar Romano Groenewald
- Born: 30 April 1990 (age 36) Mossel Bay, South Africa
- Height: 1.84 m (6 ft 1/2 in)
- Weight: 86 kg (13 st 8 lb; 190 lb)
- School: Hoërskool Hentie Cilliers, Virginia

Rugby union career
- Position: Flanker
- Current team: Leopards
Youth career
- 2006–2011: Griffons
Senior career
Years	Team	Apps	(Points)
2010–2016	Griffons	37	(25)
2019–present	Leopards	1	(5)
- Correct as of 1 July 2019

Wilmar Romano 'Boetie' Groenewald (born 30 April 1990 in Mossel Bay, South Africa) is a South African rugby union player for the Leopards in the Rugby Challenge. His regular position is flanker.

== Career ==
He played high school rugby for Hoërskool Hentie Cilliers in Virginia. In 2006, he was selected to represent the Griffons at the Under-16 Grant Khomo Week and in 2007, he was selected for their Under-18 side that played at the Craven Week in Stellenbosch. Despite still being in the Under-17 age group, he also represented the Griffons U19s in the Under-19 Provincial Championship later in that year. He again played Craven Week rugby at the 2008 tournament in Pretoria and he also played in the Under-19 Provincial Championship in 2008, as well as in 2009.

In 2010, he was included in the Griffons senior squad for the 2010 Vodacom Cup competition. He was an unused replacement in their 36–24 victory over the Falcons in Welkom, but he did make his first class debut the following week in a 26–40 defeat to the Blue Bulls in Atteridgeville. In the second half of the year, he made seven starts for the Griffons U21 side during the 2010 Under-21 Provincial Championship.

He started their 2011 Vodacom Cup match against the SWD Eagles in Welkom, which the Griffons narrowly lost 38–41; his only game time in the competition. He was selected in their senior squad for the 2011 Currie Cup First Division season and made his Currie Cup debut in their match against the Eastern Province Kings in Port Elizabeth, which ended in a 26–67 defeat. That was his only involvement and he reverted to the Griffons U21 side to play in the 2011 Under-21 Provincial Championship, starting all six of their matches and scoring two tries.

He failed to make any appearances during the 2012 Vodacom Cup, but returned to action in time for the 2012 Currie Cup First Division. He started their opening match of the season, a 37–27 win over the Falcons in Kempton Park and made a further three appearances in the competition. However, he suffered a torn cruciate ligament in their match against the Boland Cavaliers which ruled him out of the remainder of the season.

He returned to action nine months later, playing off the bench in their 2013 Vodacom Cup matches against the Falcons and the Blue Bulls. He played in six matches in the 2013 Currie Cup First Division; one of those matches was their Round Eight clash against the Falcons in Welkom. Groenewald scored his first career try 12 minutes into the match and followed it up with another one on the 57-minute mark, helping the Griffons to a 50–35 victory. However, that was one of just three victories during the campaign as they finished sixth in the eight-team competition.

He played six times in the 2014 Vodacom Cup, scoring his first try in that competition in their match against the Golden Lions in a 37–40 defeat in Johannesburg. He then played for the side in the 2014 Currie Cup qualification series, with a spot in the 2014 Currie Cup Premier Division up for grabs for the winner. Groenewald made three appearances as the Griffons finished third to earn a spot in the 2014 Currie Cup First Division. He made just one appearance in the competition, in which the Griffons reached the final, where they beat the Falcons 23–21 to win their first trophy for six years.
