= Dutch Reformed Church, Alexandria =

Church in Alexandria, Eastern Cape

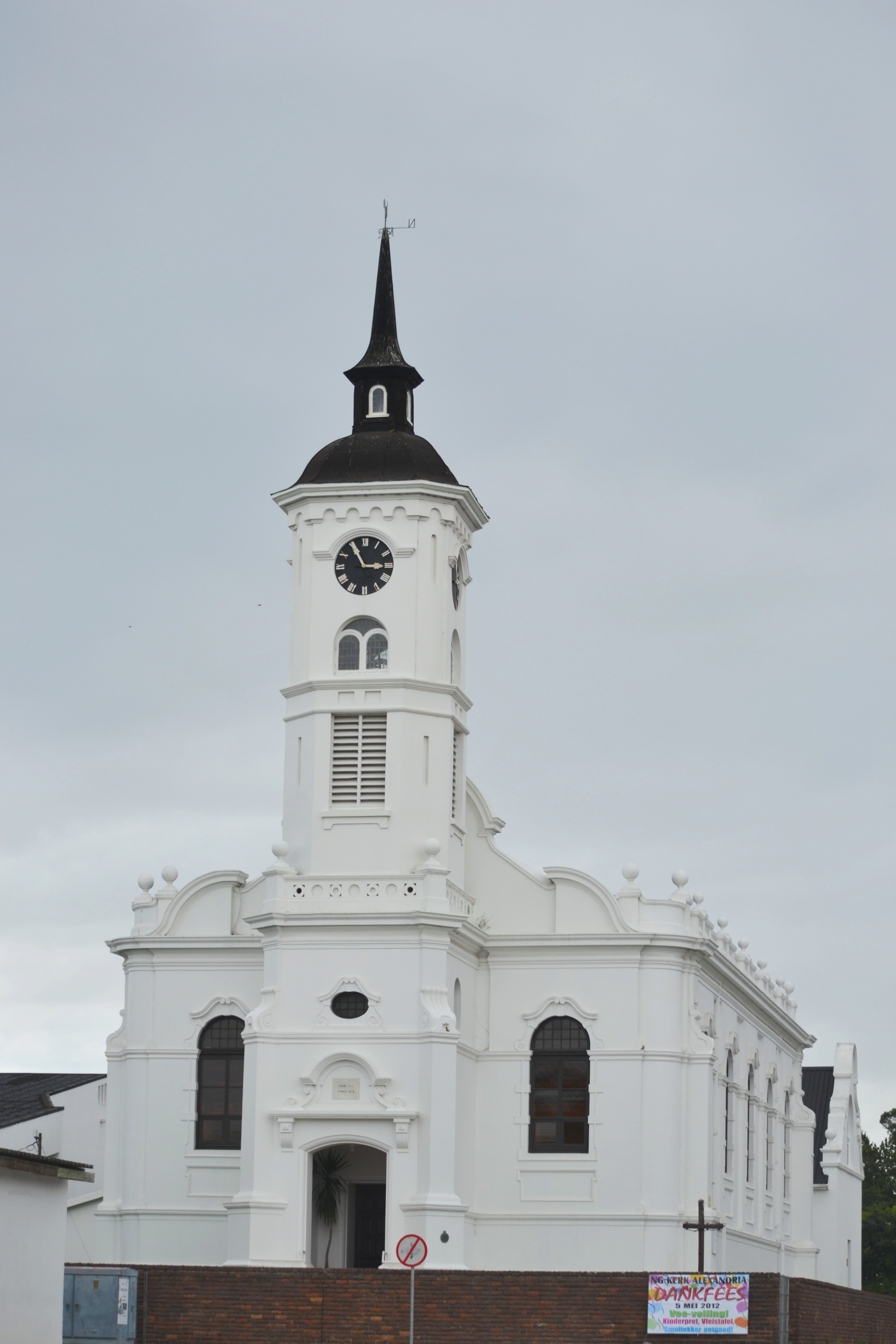

The Dutch Reformed Church is a place of worship of the Dutch Reformed Church in Alexandria, South Africa. It was declared a Provincial Heritage Site in 1987.

== List of ministers ==
- Johannes Roos, 1869–1892
- Hendrik Christoffel de Wet, 1893–1903
- Schalk Willem van Niekerk, 1904 to 1911, when he left for Turffontein Reformed Church as their second pastor
- Hendrik Andries Hanekom, 1912–1921
- Petrus Jacobus Retief, 1921–1928
- Philippus Albertus Myburgh de Vos, 1929–1938 (emeritus)
- Christopher Hermanus Latsky, 1938–1943
- Gabriel Petrus le Roux, 1943–1947
- Hendrik Adrian de Wet, 1947–1953 (emeritus; died on 5 July 1970)
- Willem Adriaan Marais, 1953–?
- Vidius Nel, 1961–1965
- Floris Nicolaas Marais, 5 February 1966–1969
- Erick Severis Breytenbach, 18 July 1970–1973
- Gabriel Gideon le Roux, 1974–1980
- Jacob Francois van Wyk, 1981 to 1998 (emeritus)
- Nikolaas Jakobus du Toit, 2006 – (pastoral help) – 2012
- Willem Dawid (Dawie) Schoeman, 2012 – (present), came over from Ugie Reformed Church (NGK)

== Sources ==
- Olivier, the Rev. P.L. (samesteller). Ons gemeentelike feesalbum. Cape Town/Pretoria: N.G. Kerk-uitgewers, 1952.
