= Platythomisus sibayius =

Sibayi's Platythomisus Crab Spider

Scientific classification
- Kingdom: Animalia
- Phylum: Arthropoda
- Subphylum: Chelicerata
- Class: Arachnida
- Order: Araneae
- Infraorder: Araneomorphae
- Family: Thomisidae
- Genus: Platythomisus
- Species: P. sibayius

Binomial name
- Platythomisus sibayius Lawrence, 1968

Species of spider

Platythomisus sibayius is a species of spider in the family Thomisidae. It is endemic to KwaZulu-Natal, South Africa and is commonly known as Sibayi's Platythomisus crab spider.

== Distribution ==
Platythomisus sibayius is found in South Africa, where it is known only from iSimangaliso Wetland Park at Lake Sibayi Eastern Shore in KwaZulu-Natal.

== Habitat and ecology ==
Platythomisus sibayius occurs at an altitude of 20 m. Individuals were found at night between the leaves of a small tree.

== Conservation ==
Platythomisus sibayius is listed as Data Deficient for taxonomic reasons by the South African National Biodiversity Institute. The species is known only from the type locality and more sampling is needed to collect the male and determine the species range.

== Taxonomy ==
The species was originally described by Lawrence in 1968 from Lake Sibayi. Only the female is known with a drawing of the habitus.
