= Kalvano King =

South African rugby union player

- Full name: Kalvano Xenito King
- Born: 10 January 1989 (age 37) Grahamstown, South Africa
- Height: 1.60 m (5 ft 3 in)
- Weight: 62 kg (137 lb; 9 st 11 lb)
- School: Alexandria High School, Alexandria

Rugby union career
- Position: Scrum-half
- Current team: Despatch
Youth career
- 2005–2010: Eastern Province Kings
Amateur team(s)
Years	Team	Apps	(Points)
2010–2013	Progress		
2015–present	Despatch	3	(20)
Senior career
Years	Team	Apps	(Points)
2014	Eastern Province Kings	1	(0)
- Correct as of 7 April 2015
International career
Years	Team	Apps	(Points)
2007	S.A. Schools		
- Correct as of 5 March 2014

Kalvano Xenito King (born 10 January 1989 in Grahamstown) is a South African rugby union player currently playing for Eastern Province Grand Challenge club side Despatch. His regular position is scrum-half.

== Career ==
=== Youth and club rugby ===
King represented Eastern Province at several youth tournaments – he played for them at the Under-16 Grant Khomo Week in 2005, the Under-18 Academy Week in 2006 and the Under-18 Craven Week in 2007 – the latter culminating in a call-up to the S.A. Schools side.

He played for their Under-19 side during the 2007 and 2008 Under-19 Provincial Championship competitions and for the Under-21 side during the 2008 and 2009 Under-21 Provincial Championship competitions. He was offered a junior contract with Eastern Province for 2010 and included in the squad for the 2010 Vodacom Cup competition, but suffered a serious wrist injury and failed to make the breakthrough to the senior side.

He dropped down to playing club rugby, where he helped Uitenhage-based side Progress reach the final of the 2012 Super 12 series and being included in an Eastern Province Country Districts team.

=== Eastern Province Kings ===
Prior to the 2014 season, Eastern Province announced that club players would join their pre-season training squad and King was one of the players selected. He played in pre-season matches against Despatch and Griquas and was then named in the squad for the 2014 Vodacom Cup.

He made his senior debut for the Eastern Province Kings in the 2014 Vodacom Cup by starting in their 17–10 opening day defeat to Kenyan side Simba XV. However, that turned out to be his only first class appearance, as he was not named in the Eastern Province Kings squad for the 2014 Currie Cup Premier Division.
