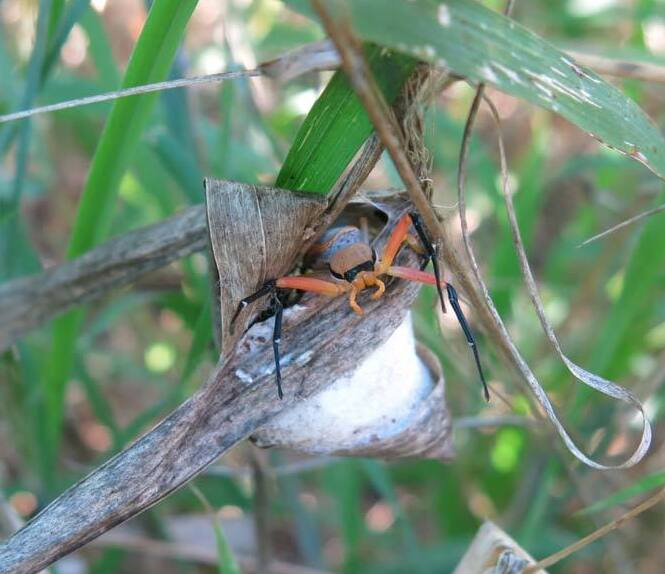

Scientific classification
- Kingdom: Animalia
- Phylum: Arthropoda
- Subphylum: Chelicerata
- Class: Arachnida
- Order: Araneae
- Infraorder: Araneomorphae
- Family: Thomisidae
- Genus: Platythomisus
- Species: P. deserticola

Binomial name
- Platythomisus deserticola Lawrence, 1936

= Platythomisus deserticola =

Botswana Platythomisus Crab Spider

Species of spider

Platythomisus deserticola is a species of spider in the family Thomisidae. It is found in southern Africa and is commonly known as Botswana Platythomisus crab spider.

== Distribution ==
Platythomisus deserticola is found in Botswana and South Africa.

In South Africa, the species is recorded from Mpumalanga. It has been found at Skukuza and Pretoriuskop Numbi within Kruger National Park.

== Habitat and ecology ==
Platythomisus deserticola inhabits the Savanna biome at altitudes ranging from 258 to 585 m.

Individuals have been sampled free-living on vegetation.

== Conservation ==
Platythomisus deserticola is listed as Least Concern due to its wide geographical range. The species is protected in Kruger National Park.

== Taxonomy ==
The species was originally described by Lawrence in 1936 from Botswana. Only the female is known.
