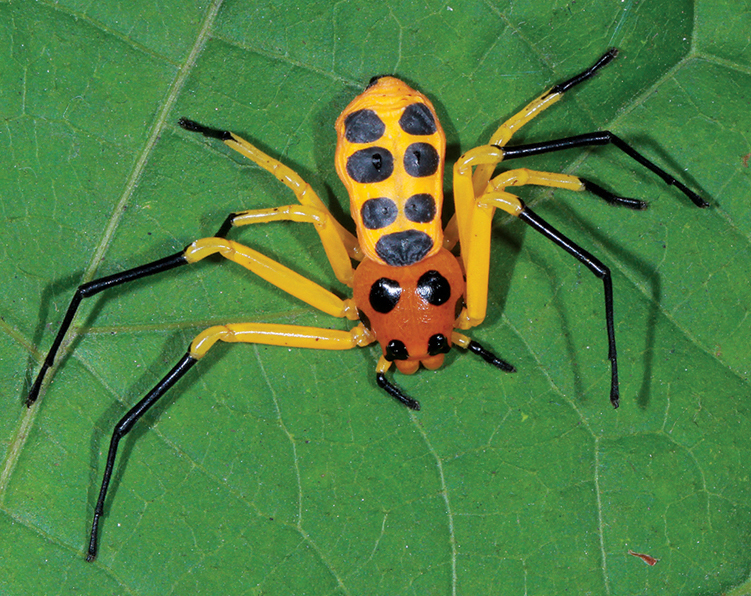
- Female Platythomisus xiandao
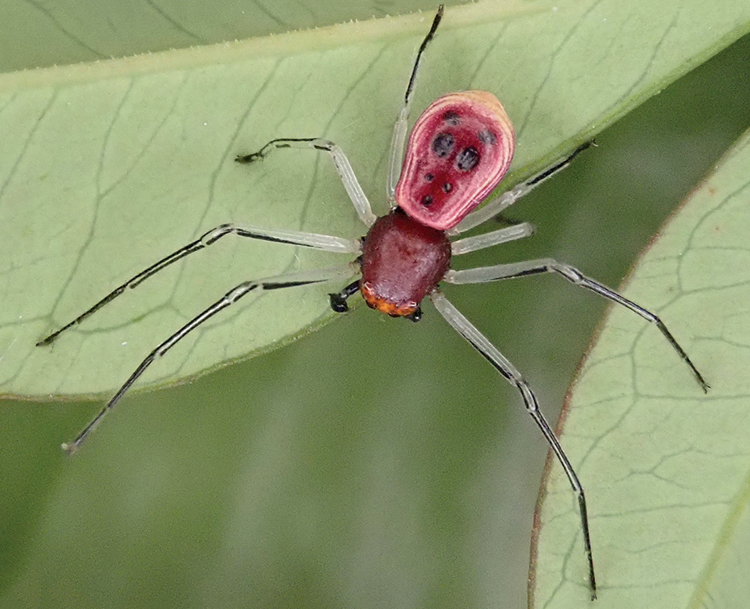
- Male Platythomisus xiandao

Scientific classification
- Kingdom: Animalia
- Phylum: Arthropoda
- Subphylum: Chelicerata
- Class: Arachnida
- Order: Araneae
- Infraorder: Araneomorphae
- Family: Thomisidae
- Genus: Platythomisus; Doleschall, 1859

Type species
- Thomisus 8-maculatus C. L. Koch, 1845

Species
- See text

Diversity
- 14 species

= Platythomisus =

Genus of spiders

Platythomisus is a genus of flattened crab spiders (family Thomisidae) from Africa and Southern Asia.

== Biology ==
Platythomisus octomaculatus is a rather rare species. One of the plants it has been found on is the yellow Hibiscus tiliaceus. In captivity it was observed to feed on bees.

== Description ==
Members of Platythomisus are large spiders measuring 9 to 17 mm with brightly coloured bodies.

The carapace, abdomen and legs have distinct black markings in the form of spots or bands. The carapace is slightly flattened and narrower anteriorly with absent eye tubercles.

Both eye rows are almost straight to slightly recurved with the posterior row slightly wider than the anterior row. The posterior median eyes are smallest. The median ocular quadrangle is wider than long and narrower anteriorly.

The chelicerae have a broad pilose band of setae ventrally. The abdomen is slightly longer than wide and flattened.

Platythomisus octomaculatus has a yellow-orange color with four round, black marks on the cephalothorax and seven large black marks on the opisthosoma, with one spot near the cephalothorax, and the other six following behind in two longitudinal rows. The legs are of a bright yellow, with the outer halves black.

== Life style ==
These are free living plant dwellers.

== Name ==
The genus name is combined from Ancient Greek platys "flat" and the name of the crab spider genus Thomisus.

== Species ==
As of October 2025, this genus includes fourteen species:

- Platythomisus deserticola Lawrence, 1936 – Botswana, South Africa
- Platythomisus heraldicus Karsch, 1878 – Tanzania (Zanzibar)
- Platythomisus insignis Pocock, 1900 – Equatorial Guinea, DR Congo
- Platythomisus jubbi Lawrence, 1968 – South Africa
- Platythomisus jucundus Thorell, 1894 – Indonesia (Java)
- Platythomisus nigriceps Pocock, 1900 – Equatorial Guinea, Ivory Coast
- Platythomisus octomaculatus (C. L. Koch, 1845) – Thailand, Malaysia, Singapore, Brunei, Indonesia (type species)
- Platythomisus pantherinus Pocock, 1898 – Malawi
- Platythomisus quadrimaculatus van Hasselt, 1882 – Indonesia (Sumatra)
- Platythomisus scytodimorphus (Karsch, 1886) – DR Congo?
- Platythomisus sexmaculatus Simon, 1897 – Somalia
- Platythomisus sibayius Lawrence, 1968 – South Africa
- Platythomisus sudeepi Biswas, 1977 – India, Sri Lanka
- Platythomisus xiandao Lin & Li, 2019 – India, China
