= Wandile Putuma =

South African rugby union player

- Born: 8 August 1990 (age 36) East London, South Africa
- Height: 1.92 m (6 ft 3 1/2 in)
- Weight: 92 kg (14 st 7 lb; 203 lb)
- School: Port Rex Technical High School, East London
- University: Buffalo City FET College, East London

Rugby union career
- Position: Lock
- Current team: Eastern Province Elephants
Youth career
- 2009–2011: Border Bulldogs
Senior career
Years	Team	Apps	(Points)
2014–2017	Border Bulldogs	54	(25)
2016–2018	Griquas	17	(15)
2019	Falcons	5	(0)
2019–present	Eastern Province Elephants	8	(5)
- Correct as of 3 September 2019

Wandile Putuma (born 8 August 1990 in East London, South Africa) is a South African rugby union player for the Eastern Province Elephants in the Currie Cup and in the Rugby Challenge. His regular position is lock.

== Career ==
=== Youth ===
After high school, he joined the Border rugby academy; he was a member of the Border U19 side during the 2009 Under-19 Provincial Championship and of the Border U21s in the 2010 and 2011 editions of the Under-21 Provincial Championships.

=== Border Bulldogs ===
However, it wasn't until 2014 that he became involved in first class matches; he was one of several amateur club players brought into the Border Bulldogs provincial set-up at the start of 2014 after the professional side was declared bankrupt. He was included in their squad for the 2014 Vodacom Cup competition and made his debut by starting their opening round match against a Sharks XV. He scored a try in the 22nd minute of the match, his side's first points in the competition, in a 24–46 defeat in East London. He started two more matches and also came on as a substitute in four matches and scored a second try in their 17–54 defeat to Free State XV in Bloemfontein. However, he couldn't prevent the Border Bulldogs finishing bottom of the log.

Putuma was retained for their 2014 Currie Cup qualification campaign and he made his debut in the Currie Cup competition in their second match of the season, a 12–37 defeat to the Boland Cavaliers, and after one more appearance from the bench, made his first of three consecutive starts in their match against the SWD Eagles. The Border Bulldogs lost all six of their matches to qualify to the 2014 Currie Cup First Division. Putuma once again started the first two matches of the First Division campaign playing off the bench before starting their final three matches in the competition as the Bulldogs finished bottom of the log with a single win all season.

He returned for the Border Bulldogs in the 2015 Vodacom Cup and was a regular starter for them during the campaign.
