= Kariega River =

River in the Eastern Cape, South Africa

Kariega River Tyelerha, Karuiga, Karuka
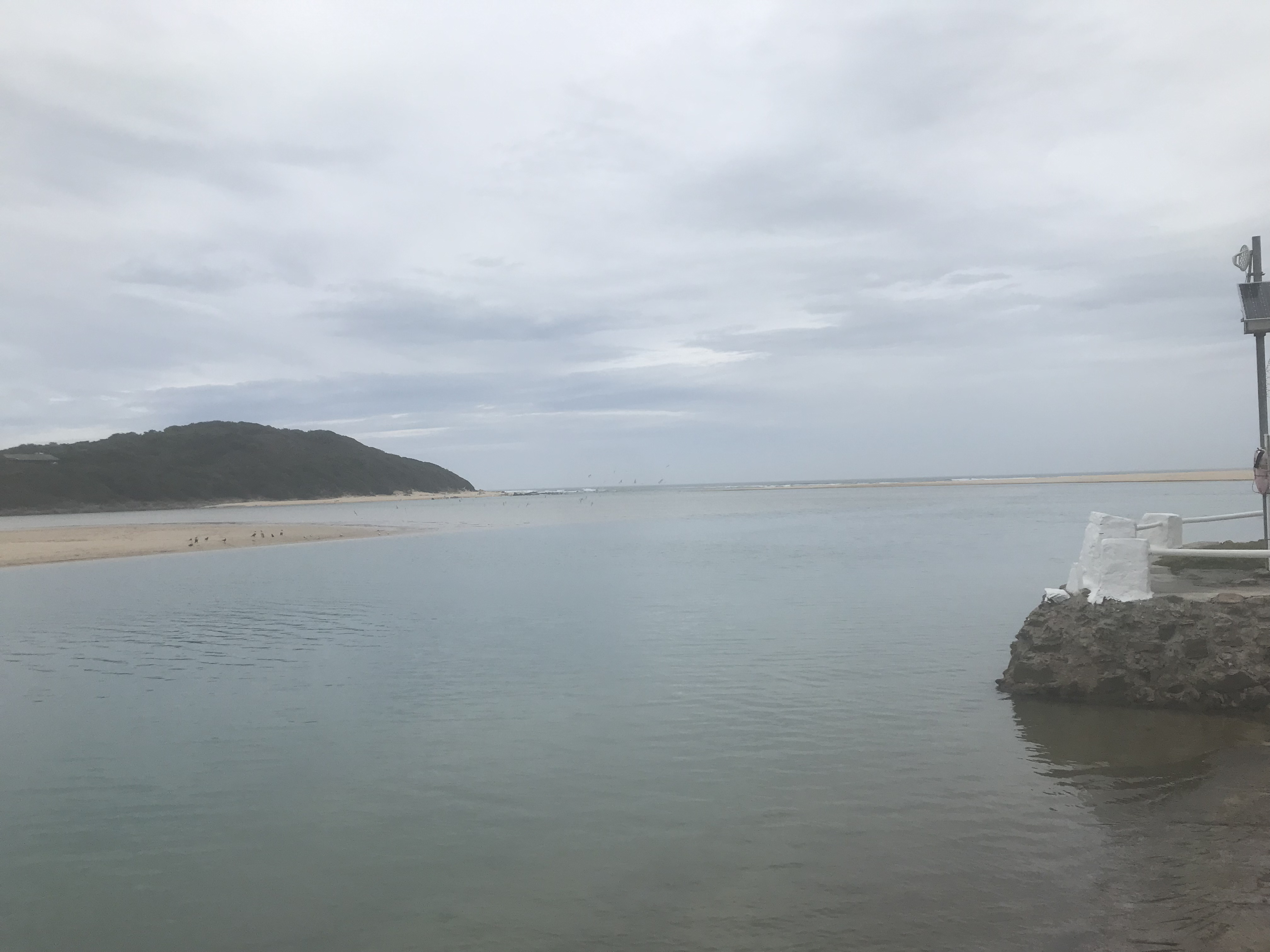
- River Mouth at Kenton-on-Sea

- Location of the Kariega River's mouth

Location
- Country: South Africa
- Province: Eastern Cape
- Towns: Kenton-on-Sea

Physical characteristics
- Source
  - location: Eastern Cape, South Africa
- Mouth: Indian Ocean
  - location: Kenton-on-Sea, Eastern Cape, South Africa
  - coordinates: 33°40′56″S 26°41′00″E
  - elevation: 0 m (0 ft)
- Length: 138 km (86 mi)
- Basin size: 685 km^{2} (264 sq mi)
- Discharge
  - location: Kenton-on-Sea

The Kariega River (Afrikaans: Kariegarivier) is located in the Eastern Cape province of South Africa. The river begins 24 kilometres west of Grahamstown and is characterized by its intermittent flow. It empties into the Indian Ocean through an estuary.

== Origin of the name ==
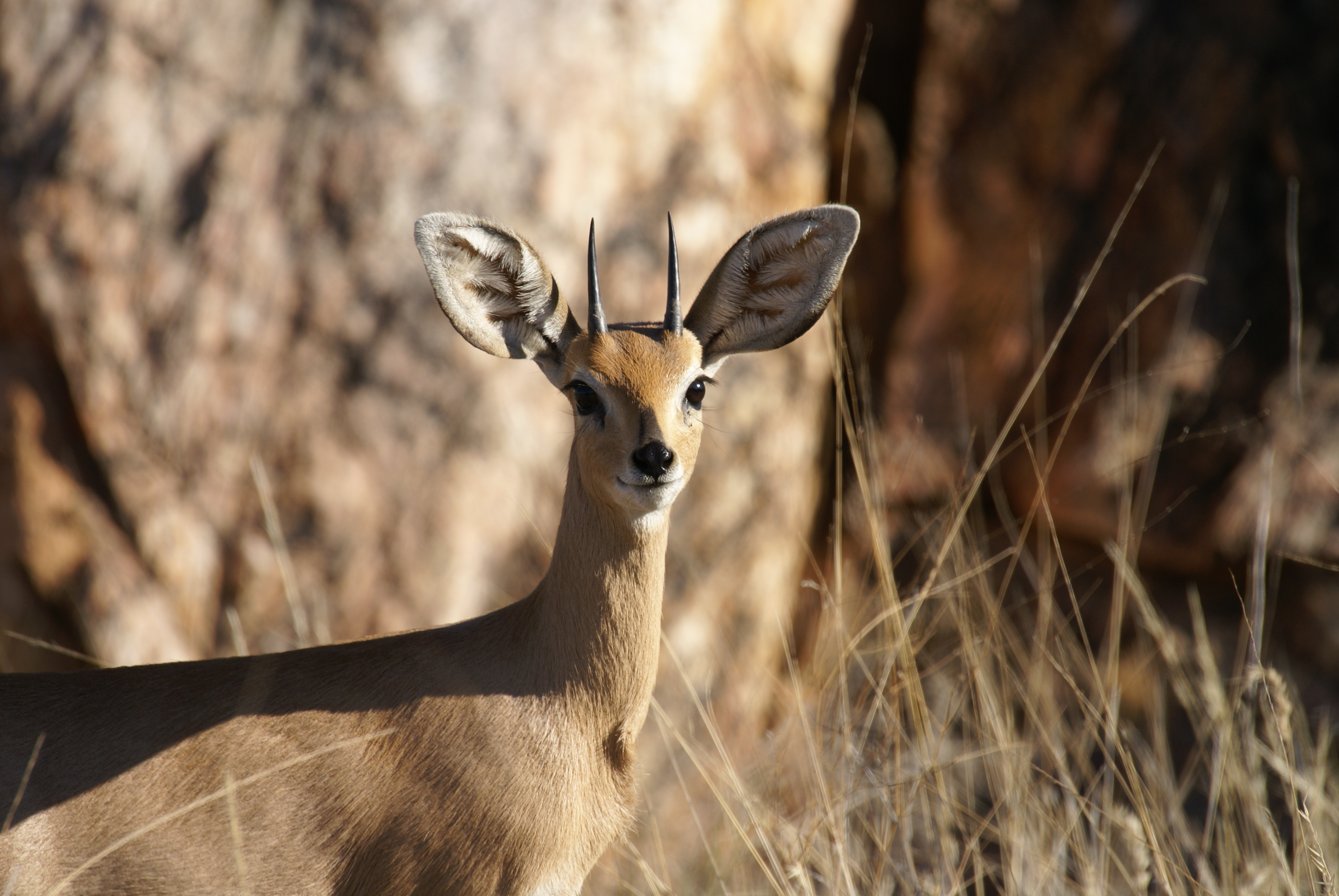
The Steenbok or Kariega antelope

The exact meaning of the Kariega's name is unknown, but it may have originated from the Khoikhoi language. The Khoikhoi were among the first settlers in the Cape region. Although their descendants still live in the area, their language is only spoken in some parts of the Northern Cape. However, many Khoikhoi words are still used for various locations in South Africa, including the Garden Route town of Knysna, meaning "ferns," and the Cango Caves, Cango meaning "wet mountain."

Cave paintings found near the river depict local wildlife, including the Steenbok.

== Other Kariega Rivers ==
In the Eastern Cape, there are three Kariega Rivers.

The Kariega and the Beervlei Dam

The Kariega River drains into the Beervlei Dam north of Willowmore. The name of this river has appeared in several forms, including Kariega and Karuka, and experts have concluded that Kariega is the older form, alluding to buffalo. The river was called the Buffels, or Buffalo, by the area's first European settlers. However, several sources claim that the name means 'steenbok,' based not on linguistics but on the presence of the antelope in the area.

The Kariega and the Sundays River

The Kariega River is a tributary of the Sundays River. For much of its course, it runs across the Steenbok Flats. Based on linguistic evidence and the abundance of steenbok in this area, experts feel that this instance of Kariega refers to 'steenbok'.

The Kariega and the Great Fish River

The Kariega River, which has its source in the highlands 20 kilometres north of Somerset East, is also a tributary of the Great Fish River.
