= Ndlambe Local Municipality =

Ndlambe
- Local municipality
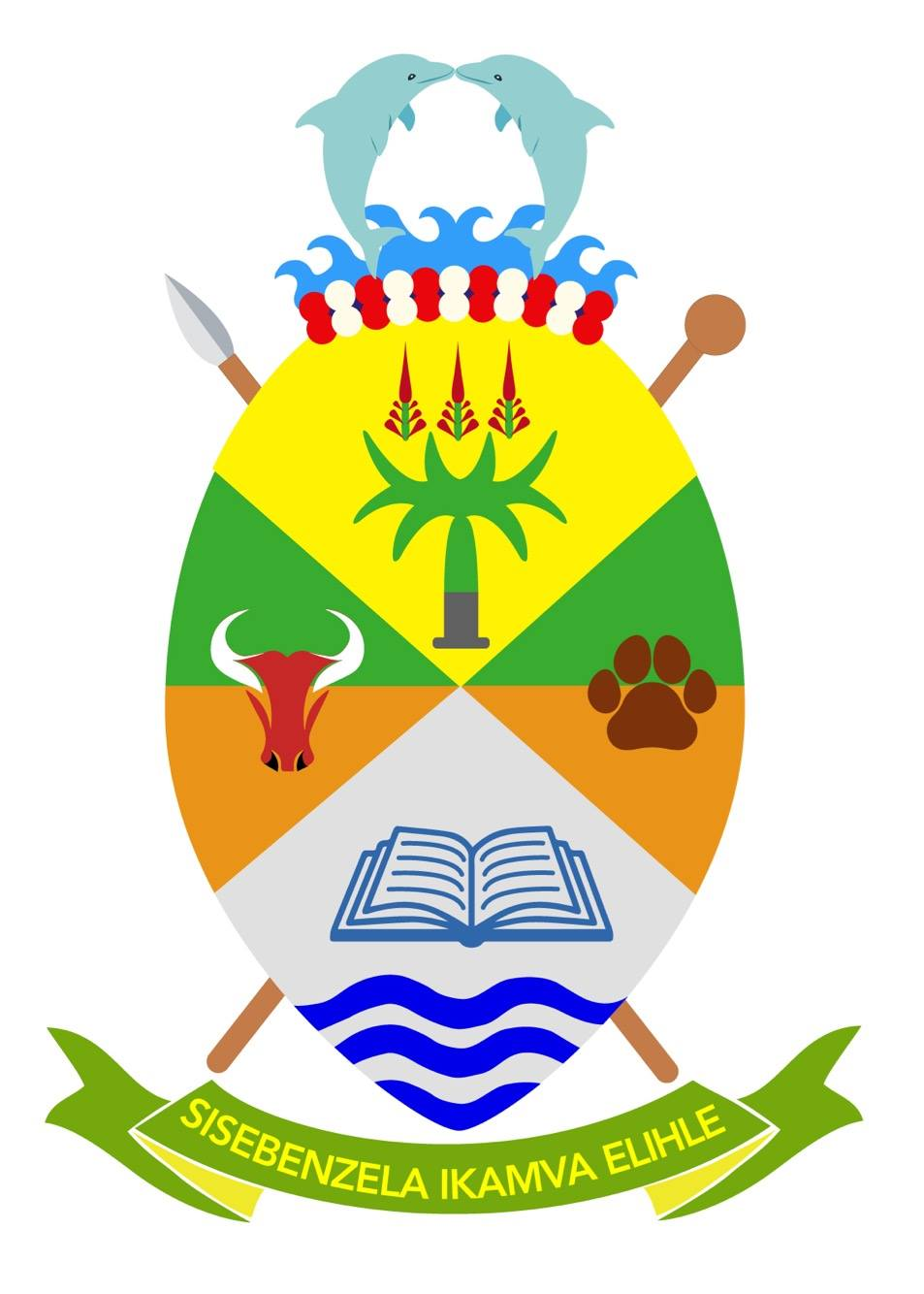
- Seal

- Location in the Eastern Cape
- Coordinates: 33°36′S 26°53′E
- Country: South Africa
- Province: Eastern Cape
- District: Sarah Baartman
- Seat: Port Alfred
- Wards: 10

Government
  - Type: Municipal council

Area
  - Total: 1,841 km^{2} (711 sq mi)

Population (2022)
  - Total: 87,797
  - Density: 47.69/km^{2} (123.5/sq mi)

Racial makeup (2022)
  - Black African: 68.2%
  - Coloured: 7.6%
  - Indian/Asian: 0.4%
  - White: 23.0%

First languages (2011)
  - Xhosa: 72.9%
  - English: 12.5%
  - Afrikaans: 11.9%
  - Other: 2.7%
- Time zone: UTC+2 (SAST)
- Municipal code: EC105

Ndlambe Municipality (Xhosa: uMasipala wase Ndlambe; Afrikaans: Ndlambe Munisipaliteit) is a local municipality within the Sarah Baartman District Municipality, in the Eastern Cape of South Africa. Its capital is Port Alfred. It is a predominantly rural area with agriculture and tourism dominating the economy.

It encompasses the towns of Kenton-on-Sea, Boknesstrand, Bathurst, Boesmansriviermond, Alexandria, and Cannon Rocks.

== Politics ==
The municipal council consists of twenty members elected by mixed-member proportional representation. Ten councillors are elected by first-past-the-post voting in ten wards, while the remaining ten are chosen from party lists so that the total number of party representatives is proportional to the number of votes received.

In the election of 4 November 2026 the African National Congress (ANC) lost its majority, but won a plurality of nine seats.

The following table shows the results of the election.

| Party | Ward | | | List | | | Total seats |
| Party | Votes | % | Seats | Votes | % | Seats | Total seats |
|---|---|---|---|---|---|---|---|
| African National Congress | 9,891 | 43.34 | 7 | 9,832 | 42.83 | 2 | 9 |
| Democratic Alliance | 8,027 | 35.18 | 3 | 8,045 | 35.04 | 4 | 7 |
| Thina Bahlali People's Movement | 2,335 | 10.23 | 0 | 2,548 | 11.10 | 2 | 2 |
| Economic Freedom Fighters | 736 | 3.23 | 0 | 721 | 3.14 | 1 | 1 |
| Freedom Front Plus | 598 | 2.62 | 0 | 599 | 2.61 | 1 | 1 |
| 8 other parties | 1,233 | 5.40 | 0 | 1,212 | 5.28 | 0 | 0 |
| Total | 22,820 | 100.00 | 10 | 22,957 | 100.00 | 10 | 20 |
| Valid votes | 22,820 | 99.15 | | 22,957 | 99.18 | | |
| Invalid/blank votes | 195 | 0.85 | | 190 | 0.82 | | |
| Total votes | 23,015 | 100.00 | | 23,147 | 100.00 | | |
| Registered voters/turnout | 37,779 | 60.92 | | 37,779 | 61.27 | | |

== Main places ==
The 2001 census divided the municipality into the following main places:

| Place | Code | Area (km^{2}) | Population | Most spoken language |
|---|---|---|---|---|
| Alexandria | 20501 | 3.84 | 3,087 | Afrikaans |
| Bathurst | 20502 | 8.45 | 600 | English |
| Boknesstrand | 20503 | 1.09 | 216 | Afrikaans |
| Cannon Rocks | 20504 | 1.79 | 209 | English |
| Ekuphumleni | 20505 | 1.10 | 3,619 | Xhosa |
| Kasuka | 20506 | 1.17 | 96 | Xhosa |
| Kenton-on-Sea | 20507 | 7.45 | 5,266 | Xhosa |
| Kleinemonde | 20508 | 5.74 | 18 | Xhosa |
| Kwanonqubela | 20509 | 0.81 | 4,626 | Xhosa |
| Nkwenkwezi | 20511 | 3.35 | 14,673 | Xhosa |
| Nolukhanyo | 20512 | 1.22 | 4,961 | Xhosa |
| Port Alfred | 20513 | 19.02 | 6,287 | English |
| Remainder of the municipality | 20510 | 1,945.79 | 11,833 | Xhosa |

== Corruption and financial mismanagement ==
The municipality is one of the few in the Eastern Cape not to have been flagged for audit irregularities. However, the Hawks are investigating allegations of corruption, and the municipality has been flagged by the Public Protector for poor service delivery, including unfixed potholes, unusable toilets, and braai areas in poor condition, with the municipality claiming to have insufficient funds. In December 2023, the council awarded a R700,000 contract for a one-day music festival, with the local residents association expressing shock at the expense.
