= Alexandria, Eastern Cape =

Alexandria
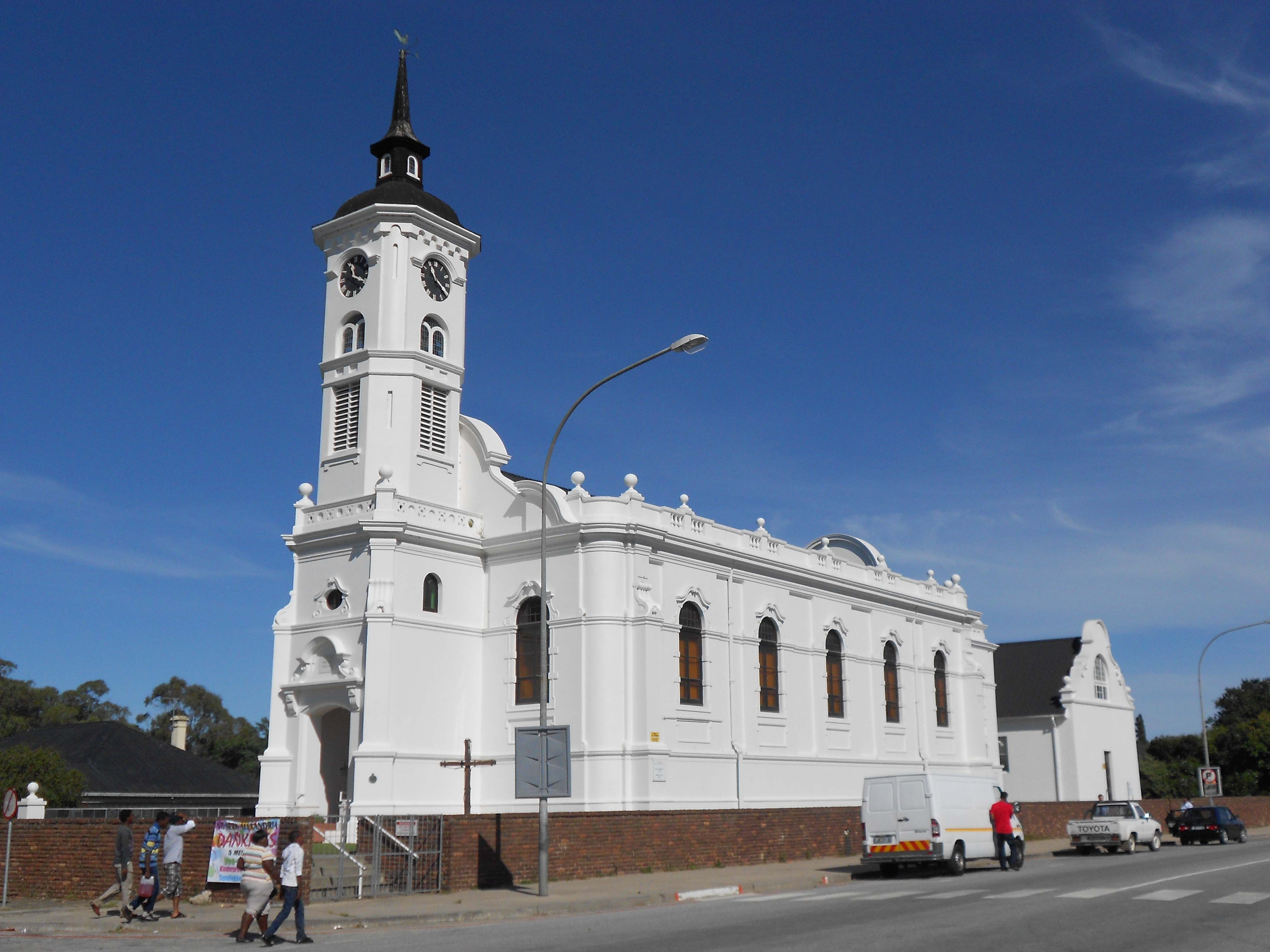
- The Dutch Reformed Church, a Provincial Heritage Site, in Alexandria

- Location within Eastern Cape Location within South Africa
- Coordinates: 33°39.2′S 26°24.5′E
- Country: South Africa
- Province: Eastern Cape
- District: Sarah Baartman
- Municipality: Ndlambe

Area
  - Total: 5.7 km^{2} (2.2 sq mi)

Population (2011)
  - Total: 10,085
  - Density: 1,800/km^{2} (4,600/sq mi)

Racial makeup (2011)
  - Black African: 77.4%
  - Coloured: 16.3%
  - Indian/Asian: 0.3%
  - White: 5.2%
  - Other: 0.8%

First languages (2011)
  - Xhosa: 72.8%
  - Afrikaans: 20.3%
  - English: 4.2%
  - Other: 2.7%
- Time zone: UTC+2 (SAST)
- Postal code (street): 6185
- PO box: 6185
- Area code: 046

Alexandria is a small farming town in the Eastern Cape of South Africa and is situated 100 km north-east of Gqeberha on the R72 road to Bushman's River Mouth, Kenton-on-Sea and Port Alfred. Alexandria is part of the Ndlambe Local Municipality in the Sarah Baartman District Municipality of the Eastern Cape.

It might have been established by the Dutch colonial government in the late 18th century, but was named Alexandria in 1856 after Reverend Alexander Smith. It has a warm temperate climate and is unusual in southern Africa in having no distinct dry or wet season, with rain received throughout the year.

Alexandria is one of the most important chicory producing areas in South Africa and is also known for pineapple production and dairy farming. The Alexandria area also includes the Alexandria State Forest, known as Langebos to the locals, which is a narrow stretch of pristine indigenous forest bordering the Alexandria dune field, one of the largest active dune fields in the world. The Woody Cape Nature Reserve, which stretches from the Sundays River mouth to the Bushman's River mouth and includes the dune field and the indigenous forest, has been incorporated into the Addo Elephant National Park.
