= Kenton-on-Sea =

- Location within Eastern Cape Location within South Africa Location within Africa
- Coordinates: 33.683°S 26.659°E
- Country: South Africa
- Province: Eastern Cape
- District: Sarah Baartman
- Municipality: Ndlambe

Area
  - Total: 5.18 km^{2} (2.00 sq mi)

Population (2011)
  - Total: 5,154
  - Density: 995/km^{2} (2,580/sq mi)

Racial makeup (2011)
  - Black African: 80.5%
  - Coloured: 1.4%
  - Indian/Asian: 0.2%
  - White: 17.4%
  - Other: 0.6%

First languages (2011)
  - Xhosa: 71.4%
  - English: 20.2%
  - Afrikaans: 5.7%
  - Other: 2.7%
- Time zone: UTC+2 (SAST)
- Postal code (street): 6191
- Website: kenton.co.za

Kenton-on-Sea, more commonly known as Kenton, is a small coastal town on the Sunshine Coast, in the Eastern Cape of South Africa. It is situated between the Bushmans and the Kariega Rivers, and lies approximately halfway between the industrial centres of East London (180 kilometres (110 mi)) and Gqeberha (130 kilometres (81 mi)). Kenton is part of the Ndlambe Local Municipality in the Sarah Baartman District Municipality of the Eastern Cape.

The town has a population of just over 5000 people. The centre of Kenton is predominantly English-speaking, while the township of Ekuphumleni, which has a population of about 3600 people, is almost exclusively Xhosa-speaking.
