= Promise Mthembu =

South African social activist and researcher (born 1975)

- Born: Sethembiso Promise Mthembu; 1975 (age 50–51); Umlazi, South Africa
- Education: University of KwaZulu-Natal
- Occupations: Human rights activist; Researcher
- Organizations: Gugu Dlamini Action Group; Young Woman's Dialogue; Her Rights Initiative
- Known for: HIV/AIDS activism and women's rights advocacy
- Notable work: A Positive View
- Children: Mbali

Sethembiso Promise Mthembu (born 1975) is a South African human rights activist and researcher, best known for her work on HIV/AIDS and women's rights. One of the first women in South Africa to publicly share that she was living with HIV, Mthembu is a founder of the Gugu Dlamini Action Group, the Young Woman's Dialogue, and the Her Rights Initiative.

== Biography ==
Promise Mthembu was born in 1975 in Umlazi, South Africa. She was raised in a strictly religious Catholic family.

She became politically active as a teenager, participating in projects on AIDS awareness. From 1992 to 1994, she served as president of her high school's Students' Representative Council.

Mthembu became pregnant at age 16 and gave birth to her daughter, Mbali, who has cerebral palsy. Then, in her first year as a university student in 1995, found out that she was HIV-positive.

A few months after her diagnosis, she joined the National Association of People living with HIV/AIDS (NAPWA) and the National AIDS Convention of South Africa (NACOSA) in Durban. She publicly disclosed that she had HIV, becoming one of the first women in South Africa to take that step.

Mthembu dropped out of school in the late 1990s; her parents refused to pay her university fees, on the assumption that she was going to die. However, she eventually returned to school and went on to graduate with a bachelor's in political sciences and development studies, and a master's degree in development studies from the University of KwaZulu-Natal. She has subsequently obtained a doctorate at the university, focusing her research on the contraceptive injection depo-provera.

After she began attending meetings of people living with HIV/AIDS and publicly discussing her positive status, her partner became abusive. Despite the abuse, Mthembu felt pressured to marry him because he had already paid the bride price to her parents. However, she eventually managed to leave him, despite significant social pressure.

In 1997, she went to the hospital for treatment of a cervical cyst. There she was found to have another gyeanecological problem. The doctors there would only treat her if she agreed to be sterilized, forcing her into an unwanted sterilization.

After the murder of Gugu Dlamini, an activist who was stoned and stabbed to death after disclosing that she was HIV-positive, Mthembu founded the Gugu Dlamini Action Group, which evolved into the regional branch of the Treatment Action Campaign. She went on to work for the Treatment Action Campaign, focusing on mother-child transmission of HIV and serving on its National Executive Committee. In 2004, she established the Young Woman's Dialogue, a forum for HIV-positive women in Namibia and South Africa.

After moving to the United Kingdom, she continued this work at the International Community of Women Living with HIV/AIDS. Later, she returned to South Africa and worked at the University of the Witwatersrand's Reproductive Health and HIV Research Unit, and co-founded the Her Rights Initiative in 2008.

Mthembu has fought for equal treatment access for people living with HIV/AIDS, and against the kind of forced sterilization of HIV-positive women that she experienced.
