= M37 (Durban) =

Metropolitan route in eThekwini, South Africa

Metropolitan route M37

Route information
- Maintained by eThekwini Metropolitan Municipality

Major junctions
- East end: R102 in Amanzimtoti
- N2 in Amanzimtoti
- West end: R603 in Adams Mission

Location
- Country: South Africa
- Towns: Amanzimtoti, KwaMakhutha, Adams Mission

Highway system
- Numbered routes of South Africa
← M35	→ M39

The M37, named Moss Kolnik Drive is a metropolitan route in the eThekwini Metropolitan Municipality, South Africa connecting Amanzimtoti with Adams Mission via KwaMakhutha, south of Durban.

== Route ==
The M37 begins at an intersection with the R102 (Andrew Zondo Road), north of Amanzimtoti. It begins by heading west-south-westwards as Moss Kolnik Drive, and flies over the N2 freeway. It continues to pass south of Galleria Mall and the Umbogintwini industrial complex before turning southwards and westwards to exit Amanzimtoti and enter the township of KwaMakhutha. After the intersection with Gugu Mkhize Drive, it exits KwaMakhutha to enter the rural area of Adams Mission (or Adams Rural) and curves through the undulating hills of the area before ending at the intersection with the R603 (Sbu Mkhize Road), just south of Adams College.
