= KwaMakhutha =

Township in KwaZulu-Natal, South Africa

- Location within KwaZulu-Natal Location within South Africa
- Coordinates: 30°1′S 30°51′E
- Country: South Africa
- Province: KwaZulu-Natal
- Municipality: eThekwini
- Main Place: Malagazi

Area
  - Total: 3.17 km^{2} (1.22 sq mi)

Population (2011)
  - Total: 21,336
  - Density: 6,730/km^{2} (17,400/sq mi)

Racial makeup (2011)
  - Black African: 99.5%
  - Coloured: 0.2%
  - White: 0.1%
  - Indian/Asian: 0.1%
  - Other: 0.1%

First languages (2011)
  - Zulu: 92.7%
  - English: 1.8%
  - S. Ndebele: 1.4%
  - Xhosa: 1.0%
  - Other: 3.1%
- Time zone: UTC+2 (SAST)
- Postal code (street): 4126

KwaMakhutha is a township in KwaZulu-Natal, South Africa, situated inland from eManzimtoti and means "at the Makhutha location", Makhutha is the clan name of the local king Makhanya and the word Makhutha means stale or rot, Kwa means place of. Also known as Malagazi " Rejecter of Blood"

== Geography ==
KwaMakhutha is situated approximately 29 kilometres (18 mi) south-west of Durban and forms part of the eThekwini Metropolitan Municipality, governing the Greater Durban metropolitan area. It is bordered by eZimbokodweni to the north, eManzimtoti to the east, Bhekulwandle to the south and Adams Mission to the west.

== Infrastructure ==
KwaMakhutha has a police station, library, a few churches and a masjid. The nearest shopping centres are Galleria Mall and Arbour Crossing in Amanzimtoti, Philani Valley Mall and KwaMuthwa Shopping Centre in Umlazi.

=== Primary & Secondary Schools ===
- Habiyana Primary School
- KwaMakhutha Comprehensive High School
- Kwathambo Primary School
- Magama School
- Sesifikile Primary School
- Umkhumbi High School
- Jaja primary school
- Masakhaneni high school
- Yiboni Primary School
- Gugwini Primary School

=== Higher Educational Facilities ===
- Coastal KZN TVET College

=== Transport ===
==== Roads ====
The M37 (Moss Kolnik Drive) is the main road passing through KwaMakhutha, connecting to Adams Mission in the west and Amanzimtoti in the east. Furthermore, Gugu Mkhize Drive and Mfundi Mngadi Drive connect KwaMakhutha to Umbogintwini in the north-east.

== KwaMakhutha Massacre ==
On 21 January 1987, 13 people, mostly women and children, were killed when gunmen opened fire with AK47s on the home of UDF activist and the treasurer and area organiser of the KwaMakhutha Youth League (KYL), Mr. Bheki Ntuli, at KwaMakhutha. Mr Ntuli was not at home at the time. Twenty people, including the former Minister of Defence, General Magnus Malan, and the IFP leader, Mr MZ Khumalo, were acquitted in the Durban Supreme Court in 1996 for their part in an alleged conspiracy between former state structures and the IFP to carry out the attack. Two former IFP members were granted amnesty for their role in Operation Marion, in which the SADF MI's Special Tasks provided paramilitary training and support to the IFP in a joint effort to combat the revolutionary threat posed by the ANC. Until today most Politicians are afraid to go to this area since the locals are known for being an independent Militia with significant amount of heavy duty weaponry.

== 2026 crime ==
On the night of 22 September 2026, eleven people, including a pregnant woman, were shot and killed when three men opened fire on a house party in KwaMakhutha.

== Notable people ==
- Menzi Ndwandwe
