= Isipingo =

- Location within KwaZulu-Natal Location within South Africa
- Coordinates: 29°59′00″S 30°55′30″E
- Country: South Africa
- Province: KwaZulu-Natal
- Municipality: eThekwini
- Main Place: Durban

Government
  - Councillor: Shad Nowbuth

Area
  - Total: 10.43 km^{2} (4.03 sq mi)

Population (2011)
  - Total: 30,193
  - Density: 2,895/km^{2} (7,498/sq mi)

Racial makeup (2011)
  - Black African: 40.6%
  - Coloured: 1.5%
  - Indian/Asian: 56.95%
  - White: 0.25%
  - Other: 0.7%

First languages (2011)
  - English: 59.3%
  - Zulu: 32.8%
  - Xhosa: 4.5%
  - Afrikaans: 0.9%
  - Sotho: 0.85%
- Time zone: UTC+2 (SAST)
- Postal code (street): 4133
- PO box: 4110

Isipingo is a town situated 19 kilometres (12 mi) south of Durban in KwaZulu-Natal, South Africa and currently forms part of eThekwini Metropolitan Municipality. The town is named after the Siphingo River, which in turn is thought to be named (in the Zulu language) for the intertwining cat-thorn shrubs (Scutia myrtina) present in the area, or the river's winding course.

== History ==
Dick King went to Natal in 1828 and was awarded a large stretch of land between the Umlaas/uMlaza and Mbokodweni rivers at present-day Isipingo Rail, an area where he had already acquired some farmland and built himself a house. King managed a sugar mill in Isipingo until his death in 1871 and was buried in the town.

In May 1853, the Natal Mercury reported that Mr Jeffels of Isipingo ventured into sugarcane cultivation and is erecting buildings for sugar manufacturing. The indenture system was used from 1860 to supply cheap Indian labour to the sugar cane farms in Isipingo and the surrounding areas.

In 1880, the railway line named the South Coast Line extension from Rossburgh in Durban to Isipingo Rail was completed and opened. Between 1893 and the outbreak of the Second Boer War, the South Coast Line was extended 44 km (27 mi) from Isipingo Rail to Park Rynie.

In 1962, the Natal Provincial Council made a decision to incorporate Isipingo Rail and Isipingo Beach into the Borough of Amanzimtoti, a seaside town 10 kilometres further south. In 1963, Isipingo Rail and Isipingo Beach were declared Indian Group Areas. By government decree, Isipingo Beach and Isipingo Rail would be amalgamated into a single Indian area, to be called Isipingo.

In 1972, Isipingo was no longer under the administration of Amanzimtoti and instead was governed by the Isipingo Town Board, an all-Indian self-governing local authority and later in 1974 achieved Borough status.

The elite apartheid era suburb of Isipingo Hills was then created.

=== World War II plane crashes ===
During the Second World War the Coastal Command (Southern Air Command SAAF) deployed 10 Squadron SAAF at Durban and Isipingo – this unit functioned as a torpedo bomber/ coastal reconnaissance squadron. They operated from runways that had been cut out of sugarcane fields- it was in this area that the main runway of the now defunct Durban International Airport was later built. (Note: Durban's International airport is now at La Mercy and is known as King Shaka International Airport) The squadron headquarters is now home to the Amanzimtoti Country Club (originally named Isipingo Golf Club).

In 1942 the squadron returned to its defense purposes and were re-equipped with Mohawks and Kittyhawks. There are several incidents of Kittyhawk (Note: an alternate name for a US World War II fighter aircraft Curtiss P-40 Warhawk variants) crashes near Isipingo:

- 5009 - crashed near Isipingo on 19 June 1944, 2Lt C. V. J. Giddey survived
- 5010 - crashed near Isipingo on 7 December 1943
- 5013 - caught fire in flight and crashed near Umbilo on 1 November 1943, 2Lt F. E. Hamm survived
- 5014 - stalled after takeoff and crashed near Isipingo on 2 October 1943, 2Lt K. L. Clur survived
- 5021 - crashed near Isipingo on 4 October 1943, 2Lt R. A. Hamlyn killed
- 5027 - crashed near Isipingo on 22 December 1943, 2Lt A. N. Blake killed
- 5082 - crashed near Isipingo on 18 December 1944

== Geography ==
Isipingo is situated in the South Durban Basin, approximately 10 kilometres (6 mi) north of eManzimtoti, on the northern banks of the Siphingo River. It is bordered to the north by the defunct Durban International Airport, to the west by Umlazi, and to the south by Athlone Park and Umbogintwini.

Isipingo for the most part, lies just 2 km inland from the coast, while its coastal suburb, Isipingo Beach, is separate from the main town, divided by the flat industrial area of Prospecton.

=== Suburbs ===
- Isipingo Beach
- Isipingo Hills
- Isipingo Rail
- Lotus Park
- Malaba Hills

== Economy ==
=== Industries ===
The adjoining major industrial area of Prospecton is the location of one of South Africa's largest automobile assembly plants, that of Toyota. The facility, covering almost 9 square kilometres (3.5 sq mi), is a place of employment for many Isipingo residents.

=== Retail ===
The main road through the Isipingo Rail CBD, Phila Ndwandwe Road, forms the spine for local business activity and civic services and is lined by shopping centres such as Isipingo Main, Isipingo Junction and the new Isipingo Mall (a retail development by PRASA on the railway station completed in 2020 and opened in 2025). Isipingo Beach is well known for its great fishing spots and local authentic bakery, Shaik's Bakery.

== Amenities ==
Isipingo is policed by the SAPS precinct of the Isipingo Police Station in Isipingo Rail. There also two municipal libraries in Isipingo, Isipingo Civic Library in Orient Hills and the Isipingo Beach Library.

Isipingo is served by the Isipingo Hospital, a private hospital in Isipingo Rail owned by Joint Medical Holdings. The Isipingo Clinic is the only public health clinic in Isipingo and operates as a municipal clinic under the eThekwini Metropolitan Municipality.

The area has access to fine beaches, Reunion Park Beach, Isipingo Beach River Mouth, Tiger Rocks Beach and Dakota Beach, which are regularly frequented by bathers and fishermen, especially during the sardine run.

== Transport ==
=== Rail ===
Isipingo is served by the Isipingo Railway Station, located on the South Coast Line, which runs between Durban in the north-east (via Reunion) and Kelso in the south-west (via Umbogintwini) and is operated by Metrorail.

=== Roads ===
Isipingo is located just off the N2, a major national highway connecting Durban to the north with Port Shepstone to the south with access through the R102 at Prospecton and Reunion. The area also lies along the R102 (South Coast Road) which runs parallel to the N2 and connects to Reunion in the north and Athlone Park in the south.

Other main roads in the area include:

- M35 (Wilcox Road; Wanda Cele Road) which connects to Umlazi and Umbumbulu in the west
- Phila Ndwandwe Road which serves as the main road through Isipingo Rail connecting to Umlazi Mega City in the north
- Wanda Cele Road to Umbogintwini in the south and KwaMakhutha in the south-west.

Isipingo Beach is accessed by turning off the R102 in Prospecton onto The Avenue East.

== Religious sites ==
There are a number of Hindu temples, four mosques; Isipingo Hills Musjid, Isipingo Beach Musjid, Taleemuddeen Maddrassa Mosque, and Musjid Muqarrabeen, Masjid Mehboobia in Isipingo rail and numerous Christian churches.

== Landmarks and important sites ==
- Isipingo Temple, founded in 1870, dedicated to the Goddess Marieaman
- The grave of Dick King.
- Toyota manufacturing plant in Prospecton.
- SAPREF Oil Refinery (owned by Shell and BP)
- The town also a has a transit camp on the main road, created as a result of the FIFA World Cup 2010.
- Shaik's Bakery has been open for 25 years. It is an old-school and authentic bakery.

Notes and references==
