= Umbogintwini =

- Location within KwaZulu-Natal Location within South Africa
- Coordinates: 30°01′S 30°53′E
- Country: South Africa
- Province: KwaZulu-Natal
- Municipality: eThekwini
- Main Place: Durban
  - Councillor: (African National Congress)

Area
  - Total: 5.47 km^{2} (2.11 sq mi)

Population (2011)
  - Total: 105
  - Density: 19.2/km^{2} (49.7/sq mi)

Racial makeup (2011)
  - Black African: 33.0%
  - Coloured: 5.7%
  - Indian/Asian: 15.1%
  - White: 42.5%
  - Other: 3.8%

First languages (2011)
  - English: 43.3%
  - Afrikaans: 21.2%
  - Zulu: 20.2%
  - Tsonga: 5.8%
  - Other: 9.6%
- Time zone: UTC+2 (SAST)
- Postal code (street): 4120
- PO box: 4120
- Area code: 905

Umbogintwini (a corruption of eZimbokodweni) is a suburb located approximately 23 km (14 mi) south-west of Durban, in the KwaZulu-Natal province of South Africa and it forms part of the eThekwini Metropolitan Municipality.

== History ==
In the early 1900s, Mr Arthur Chamberlain (uncle of British Prime Minister Neville Chamberlain) saw an opportunity to supply explosives to the gold mines in South Africa at a cheaper rate than he could supply from the Kynochs factory in Arklow, Ireland. In 1907, the Natal Colony (prior to the Union of South Africa in 1910) granted Kynochs Ltd a lease on 1,400 acres (566 hectares) of land south of the uMbokodweni River which was originally part of a reserve.

Mr Warner, a land surveyor from Brisbane in Australia was contracted to lay out the factory and village of Umbogintwini. A house had been built for him in the village before he moved 11 km south-west of the village on the farm which is today known as the seaside resort of Warner Beach.

The first road constructed in the village was Highbury Road which became the focus of the earliest amenities buildings and residences before the village expanded and Chamberlain Road became the next point for development in the village.

23 men and their families from the Kynochs factory in Arklow, Ireland, moved to the area from 1908 to assist with the construction of the Twini factory with the men living outside of Umbogintwini until the first houses in the village were built.

The factory officially opened for production in 1908 as Kynochs Ltd and was set up to produce explosives as well as chemicals including nitric and sulphuric acid needed in the production of the explosives. The name of the factory later changed to African Explosives and Industries (which later further changed to African Explosives and Chemical Industries) in 1924 before the ramping up of the production of explosives during World War 2. During World War 2, the Royal Navy maintained a presence when purpose-built double storey houses for the officers were constructed, on Highbury Road.

In the late 1950s and 1960s, the "new village", an extension of Umbogintwini, was developed north of Dickens Road.

Umbogintwini's post office received the corrected name in 1997.

The village did not develop much until December 2004 when 90 hectares comprising the village and golf course was sold to Keystone Investments for their Arbour Town Development and in 2006 Volvo opened its GTO plant in Umbogintwini.

Today, Highbury Road and Cocking Road do not exist due to the Arbour Town development however Chamberlain Road, Prince Street, Rees Road and Oppenheimer Road still exist today. Oppenheimer Road used to extend through the village, however today the section between Dickens Road and Junction 2 no longer exists as it now forms part of the Arbour Town development and Chamberlain Road now forms part of the Arbour Village housing complex.

== Etymology ==
"Umbogintwini'' is the corrupted version of the Zulu word Mbokodweni or eZimbokodweni meaning “river where round stones are collected” which is named after the eZimbokodweni River on which it lies on. The name "Umbogintwini'' itself is too long for many residents and thus today the suburb is commonly referred to as the shortened version of the name which is "Twini” or even sometimes ''MBog".

== Overview ==
Umbogintwini is a mixed-use area situated along the main railway between Durban and the South Coast, known as the South Coast Line, and features three distinct areas: the industrial complex, the village and Arbour Town.

=== Industrial complex ===
Much of Umbogintwini comprises the industrial complex located west of the railway. This well-developed industrial complex is widely known as a major chemical and manufacturing hub in KwaZulu-Natal, hosting manufacturing plants for several major corporations such as Volvo, Toyota Boshoku, Toyota Tsusho, Yara South Africa, Dulux, BASF, Anchor Yeast, Dyefin Textiles, Acacia, Progas, The Beverage Company, Chemical Initiatives, Sammar and APM Terminals, among others.

=== Umbogintwini Village ===
The north-eastern part of Umbogintwini, known as "the village," is a small residential area situated between the railway and the N2. It features a post office, a primary school, and a park.

=== Arbour Town ===
The south-eastern part of Umbogintwini, known as Arbour Town, is a mixed-use precinct situated between the railway and the N2. It features two shopping centres: the Galleria Mall, the largest shopping centre south of Durban, and Arbour Crossing. Arbour Town has seen consistent growth with the development of a Makro outlet and the addition of several auto sales facilities and drive-thru restaurants.

== Geography ==
Umbogintwini is bounded on the north by the eZimbokodweni River, beyond which lies the suburb of Lotus Park and on the east by the N2 freeway, beyond which lies the coastal suburb of Athlone Park. On the south it is mostly bounded by Moss Kolnik Drive, beyond which lies the coastal town of eManzimtoti and on the west by Wanda Cele Road, beyond which lies the township of eZimbokodweni.

Moreover, the suburb forms the southernmost part of the South Durban Basin, which is a heavily industrialised region located south of Durban.

== Transport ==
=== Rail ===
Umbogintwini Railway Station is located on the South Coast Line, operated by Metrorail, connecting Durban in the north-east (via Isipingo) to Kelso in the southwest (via Amanzimtoti).

=== Road ===
The N2, a major highway, passes by Umbogintwini roughly N to S from Durban to Port Shepstone, with access at Moss Kolnik Drive and Dickens Road. Both the M37 (Moss Kolnik Drive) and Mfundi Mngadi Road connect Umbogintwini with KwaMakhutha in the south-west. Wanda Cele Road connects Umbogintwini with Isipingo in the north while Dickens Road connects Umbogintwini with Athlone Park in the east.
