= Umdoni Bird Sanctuary =

Bird sanctuary in South Africa

Coordinates: 30°02′05″S 30°53′31″E

Umdoni Bird Sanctuary is situated in Amanzimtoti, KwaZulu-Natal in South Africa. The sanctuary is often simply referred to as The Bird Park by locals or as Amanzimtoti Bird Sanctuary. The area is roughly 4 ha of land including a dam on a tributary of the Amanzimtoti River. There are picnic areas and forest trails.

A kilometer-long trail runs through the sanctuary. There are three hides on the trail from which visitors can watch some of the 150 species of birds that inhabit the sanctuary. The sanctuary is home to large flocks of spur-winged geese and white-faced ducks. The sanctuary was also home to the southernmost breeding pair of palm-nut vultures in 2009. Narina trogons are also often sighted here and the endangered spotted ground-thrush has been seen.

Blue duiker and endangered Cape clawless otters frequent the sanctuary.

== Gallery ==
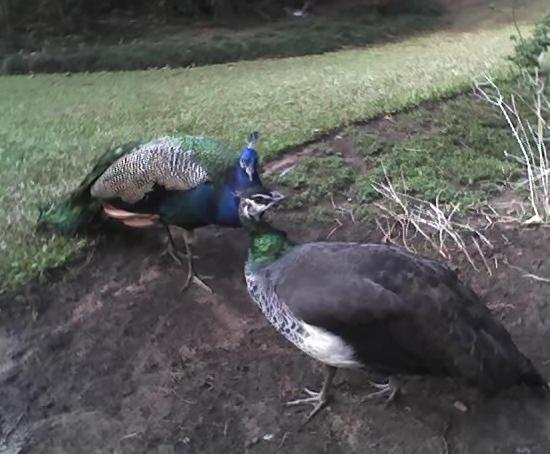
Blue peafowls at Umdoni Bird Sanctuary

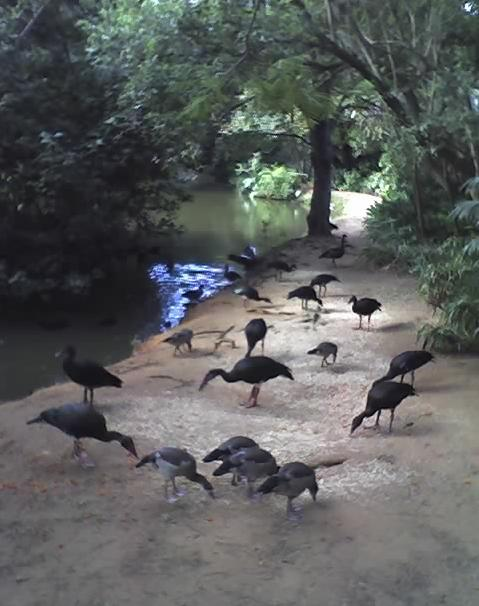
Egyptian geese and spur-winged geese at Umdoni Bird Sanctuary

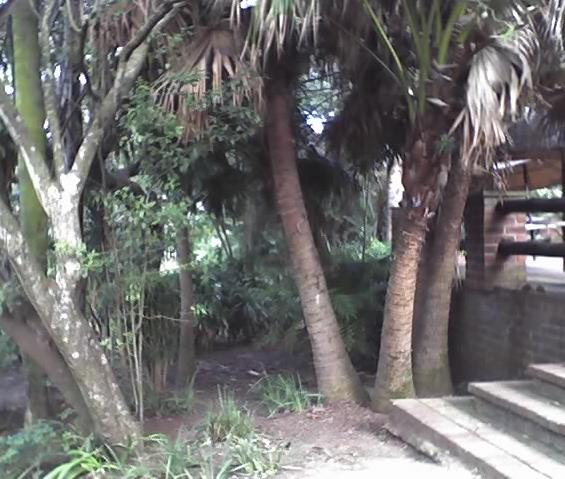
Part of the gardens at Umdoni Bird Sanctuary

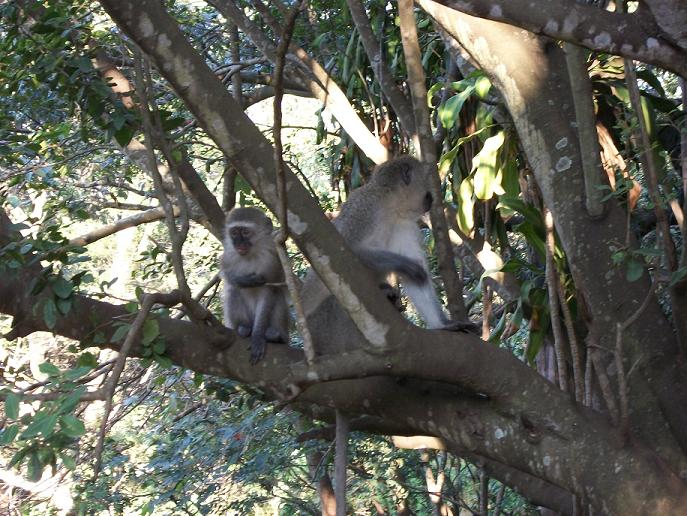
Vervet monkeys in a tree

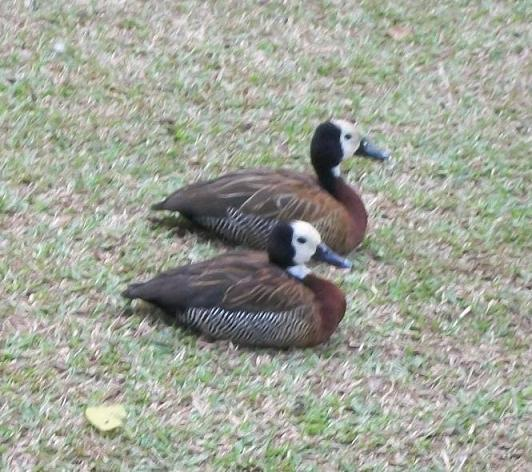
White-faced whistling ducks resting on the lawn

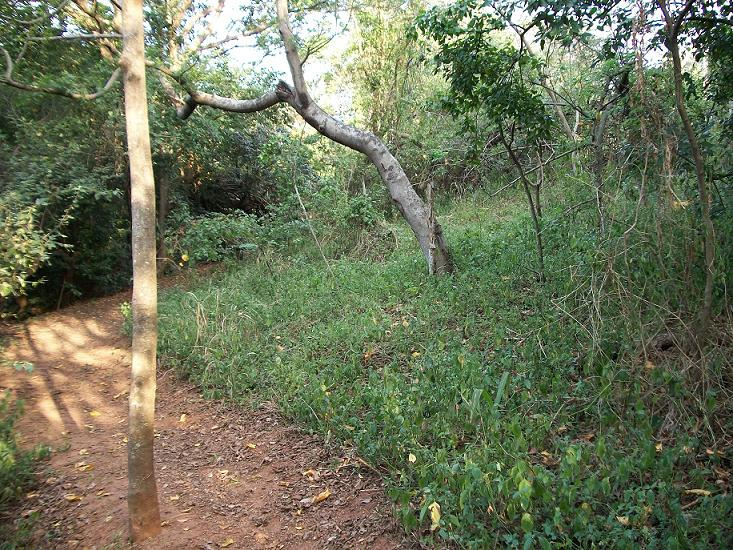
Part of the forest trail
2
