= M37 =

M37 or M-37 may refer to:

- M-37 (Michigan highway), a state highway in Michigan
- M37 (Johannesburg), a Metropolitan Route in Johannesburg, South Africa
- M37 (Pretoria), a Metropolitan Route in Pretoria, South Africa
- M37 (Durban), a Metropolitan Route in Durban, South Africa
- M37 highway, a highway in Turkmenistan
- Dodge M37, a military truck
- Ithaca M37, an American shotgun
- Messier 37, a star cluster
- 82-BM-37, an infantry mortar
- Infiniti M37, a Japanese luxury car
- M37 machine gun. Cal. .30 Browning adapted for tank use. M1919 Browning machine gun
- M37 105 mm howitzer motor carriage, WWII-era armored artillery
- Ruleville-Drew Airport
- Smith & Wesson Model 37, a gun sold and used by Japanese police departments.
- M37 screw mount, used by Asahiflex cameras
