= Global Network of People living with HIV/AIDS =

Organisation based in the Netherlands

The Global Network of People living with HIV (GNP+) is an international network representing all people living with HIV and AIDS. Their main agenda covers sexual and reproductive health/rights, human rights and the empowerment of people living with HIV and is named by GNP+ as the "Global Advocacy Agenda". This agenda was agreed upon at the 1999 International Conference of People Living with HIV/AIDS in Warsaw, Poland. GNP+ is located in Amsterdam, The Netherlands.

== Purpose ==
GNP+ advocates to improve the quality of life of all HIV positive people.

== Funding ==
Funding for the "Global Advocacy Agenda" is currently from the UK Department for International Development (DfID), the Netherlands Ministry of Development Cooperation, and the Norwegian Agency for Development Cooperation (Norad).

== See also ==
- ICW
