= Lotus Park, KwaZulu-Natal =

Lotus Park
- Location within KwaZulu-Natal Location within South Africa
- Coordinates: 30.0012°S 30.9161°E
- Country: South Africa
- Province: KwaZulu-Natal
- Municipality: eThekwini

Area
  - Total: 2.68 km^{2} (1.03 sq mi)

Population (2011)
  - Total: 13,510
  - Density: 5,040/km^{2} (13,100/sq mi)

Racial makeup (2011)
  - Black African: 28.3%
  - Coloured: 1.4%
  - Indian/Asian: 69.4%
  - White: 0.3%
  - Other: 0.6%

First languages (2011)
  - English: 70.4%
  - Zulu: 24.1%
  - Xhosa: 1.5%
  - Other: 4.0%
- Time zone: UTC+2 (SAST)
- Postal code (street): 4133
- PO box: 4111

Lotus Park is a residential area situated approximately 20 kilometres (12.4 mi) south-west of Durban in KwaZulu-Natal, South Africa. Despite Lotus Park being statistically classified as a separate suburb from Isipingo, it is often locally regarded as something of a suburb of Isipingo, sharing the same postal code (4133).

== Geography ==
Lotus Park lies between the Siphingo River along its northern and eastern edges and the eZimbokodweni River to the south. The area is bordered by Isipingo Hills in the north, Prospecton to the east, Athlone Park and Umbogintwini to the south, Malagazi to the south-west, and Malukazi to the west

== Transport ==
Wanda Cele Road (formerly Old Main Road) is the main road intersecting Lotus Park, connecting to Isipingo Rail in the north (designated as the M35) as well as Umbogintwini in the south and KwaMakhutha in the south-west. Sbu Magwanyane Drive, designated as the M35, connects Lotus Park with Umbumbulu to the west.
