= Rowan Hendricks =

South African footballer

Personal information
- Date of birth: 15 November 1979 (age 46)
- Place of birth: Cape Town, South Africa
- Height: 1.78 m (5 ft 10 in)
- Position: Midfielder

Senior career*
| Years | Team | Apps | (Gls) |
| –1999 | Cape Town Spurs | | |
| 1999–2000 | Eintracht Frankfurt | 1 | (0) |
| 2001–2002 | Ajax Cape Town | 41 | (4) |
| 2003–2005 | Rostov | 36 | (1) |
| 2006 | Supersport United | 3 | (0) |
| 2006–2008 | AK Roodeport | | |
| 2009–2010 | Ikapa Sporting | | |
| 2010–2011 | Battswood | | |

International career
| 2005 | South Africa | 2 | (0) |
- * Club domestic league appearances and goals

Rowan Hendricks (born 15 November 1979) is a South African former professional soccer player who played as a midfielder.

== Club career ==
On 20 February 2003, FC Rostov announced the signing of Hendricks and fellow South African Japhet Zwane.

In January 2005, Hendricks went on trial with Allsvenskan club Djurgården during their training camp in South Africa.

In January 2009, Hendricks signed for Ikapa Sporting.

== International career ==
Hendricks earned his first call up to the South Africa team in April 2004, being one of two uncapped players, along with Mark Arber, in Stuart Baxter's 21-man squad.

== Coaching career ==
After retiring from professional football, Hendricks became a coach at Ajax Cape Town. He is the current assistant coach of Venda Football Academy in the National First Division 2021-

== Career statistics ==
=== Club ===
As of match played 19 November 2005

Appearances and goals by club, season and competition
| Club | Season | League | | | National Cup | | Continental | | Other | | Total | |
| Club | Season | Division | Apps | Goals | Apps | Goals | Apps | Goals | Apps | Goals | Apps | Goals |
|---|---|---|---|---|---|---|---|---|---|---|---|---|
| Rostov | 2003 | Russian Premier League | 17 | 0 | 4 | 0 | - | | - | | 21 | 0 |
| Rostov | 2004 | Russian Premier League | 2 | 1 | 2 | 0 | - | | - | | 4 | 1 |
| Rostov | 2005 | Russian Premier League | 17 | 0 | 0 | 0 | - | | - | | 17 | 0 |
| Rostov | Total | | 36 | 1 | 6 | 0 | - | - | - | - | 42 | 1 |
| Career total | | | 36 | 1 | 6 | 0 | - | - | - | - | 42 | 1 |

=== International ===
As of match played 27 February 2005

South Africa
| Year | Apps | Goals |
|---|---|---|
| 2005 | 2 | 0 |
| Total | 2 | 0 |
