= Umlazi =

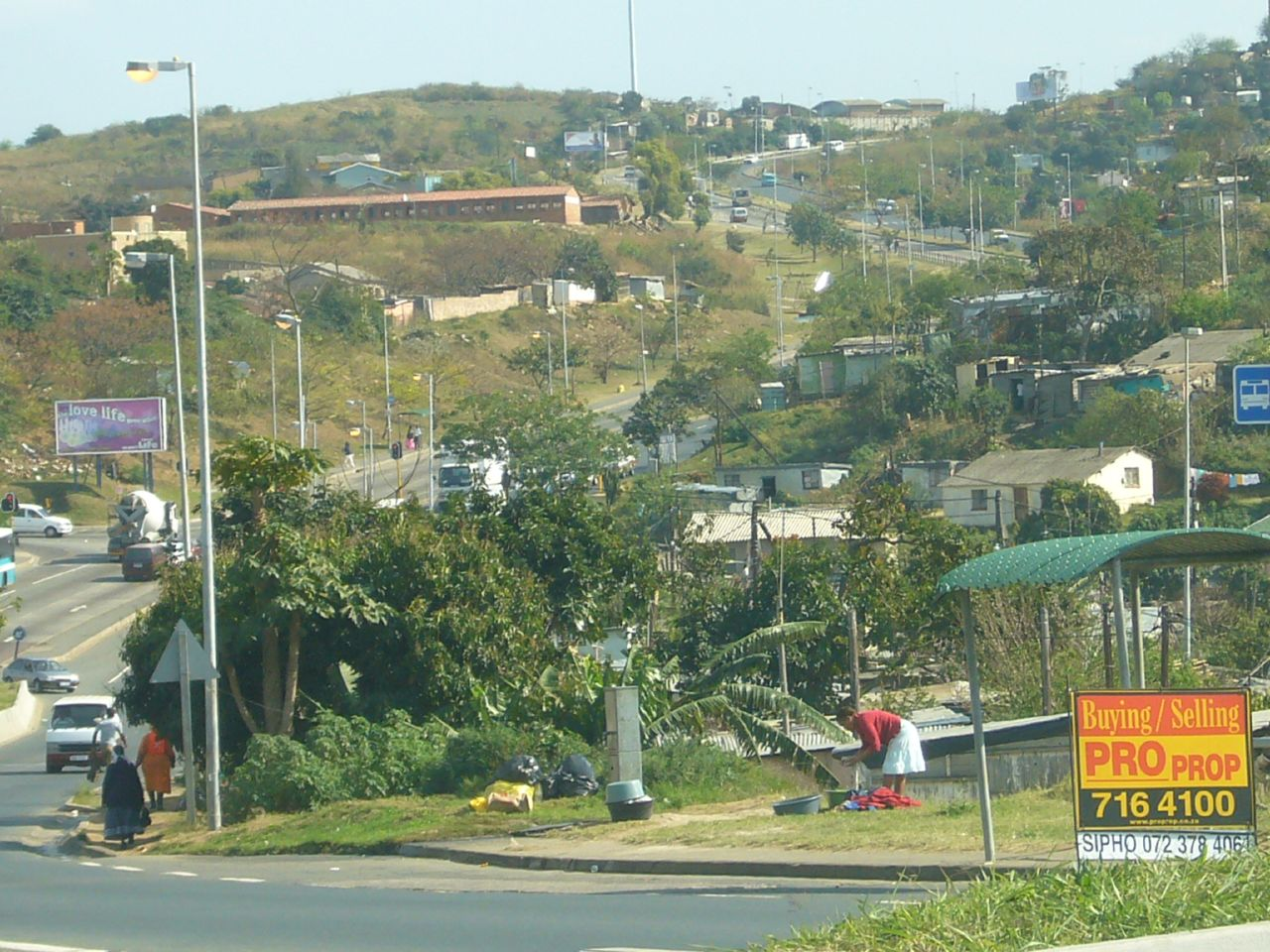
- Umlazi

- Location within KwaZulu-Natal Location within South Africa Location within Africa
- Coordinates: 29°58′S 30°53′E
- Country: South Africa
- Province: KwaZulu-Natal
- Municipality: eThekwini

Area
  - Total: 47.46 km^{2} (18.32 sq mi)

Population (2011)
  - Total: 404,811
  - Density: 8,530/km^{2} (22,090/sq mi)

Racial makeup (2011)
  - Black African: 99.4%
  - Coloured: 0.1%
  - Indian/Asian: 0.2%
  - White: 0.1%
  - Other: 0.1%

First languages (2011)
  - Zulu: 91.4%
  - Xhosa: 3.0%
  - English: 2.3%
  - S. Ndebele: 1.2%
  - Other: 2.3%
- Time zone: UTC+2 (SAST)
- Postal code (street): 4066
- PO box: 4031
- Website: http://umlazi.co.za/

Umlazi is a township in KwaZulu-Natal, South Africa, located south-west of Durban. Organisationally and administratively it forms part of the eThekwini Metropolitan Municipality and its South Municipal Planning Region.

It is the largest township in South Africa. Prior to 1 December 2023, Umlazi was the only township in the country that had its own registration plate, which was NUZ. It is divided into 26 sections, A through to Z, with the exception of I, O and X, but with an addition of AA, BB and CC.

== Etymology ==
According to legend, the name Umlazi comes from "umlaza", the Zulu word for the sour acid produced from fermented or sour milk. It is believed that when King Shaka was passing through the area, he refused to drink from a local river claiming it had the taste of "umlaza". The area was called Umlazi after this incident.

== Geography ==
Umlazi is approximately 15 kilometres (9 mi) south-west of the Durban CBD, between the uMlaza River to the north and eZimbokodweni River to the south, with the smaller Siphingo River flowing in the southern parts of the township. It lies at an average altitude of approximately 101 m (331 ft) above sea level in the hills south-east of Durban.

Its neighbouring towns and suburbs include Chatsworth to the north, Mobeni to the north-east, Malukazi to the south-east, the defunct Durban International Airport and Isipingo to the east, eZimbokodweni and Golokodo to the south as well as Esidweni, Inwabi and Ehlanzeni to the west.

== Infrastructure ==
Umlazi, like many townships in the urban areas of Cape Town, Port Elizabeth, Durban, and Johannesburg, is witnessing increased private and government investments, as seen in the construction of new shopping complexes, primary and secondary schools, universities of technology and libraries.

The new educational infrastructure is particularly, as an affordable, easily accessible quality secondary education is valuable for many children in Umlazi, particularly with regards to their search for employment following school. Most young residents do not attend tertiary institutions due to their family's limited financial resources.

There are now three shopping malls in Umlazi, the Mega-Philani Shopping Centre, Kwa-Mnyandu Shopping Centre and Umlazi Mega City Mall which is located just off the freeway that exits to Umlazi. The recently built KwaMnyandu Shopping Centre opened its doors on 5 June 2014.

Almost all sections in Umlazi have a clinic and a police station. The King Zwelithini Stadium, which is located on the Griffiths Mxenge Highway, has been revamped for the 2010 FIFA World Cup it is home to AmaZulu FC football club that is based in and around Umlazi.

== Education ==
Umlazi has two FET Colleges, Umlazi Coastal College V and BB Campuses, which are the equivalent of American Community Colleges, and a university, Mangosuthu University of Technology. There are schools that produce 100% Matric (Grade 12) pass rate, including Ogwini Comprehensive Technical High School Umlazi Comprehensive Technical High School (ComTech), Menzi High School, Velabahleke High School, Zwelibanzi High School and Qhilika High School. About 30% of homes in Umlazi are informal settlements (tin and wooden shacks). Most of these informal settlements have been demolished and replaced with brand new homes and roads that are part of the Residential Development Project (RDP).

== Transport ==
=== Roads ===
Umlazi is serviced by two north–south freeways, namely the N2 Outer Ring Road between KwaDukuza to Port Shepstone and the M4 Inkosi Albert Luthuli Freeway between the R102/M30 interchange and Durban in the north-east. The main arterial route intersecting Umlazi is the M30 Griffiths Mxenge Highway (previously Mangosuthu Highway) which connects the township with Durban (via the M4) to the north-east and Umbumbulu to the west.

Of importance is also the R102 South Coast Road bypassing Umlazi to the east, connecting Durban to the north-east and with Isipingo and Prospecton to the south-east, and the M35 Sipho Mkhize Drive, connecting the southern parts of Umlazi with Lotus Park to the south-east and Folweni to the south-west.

== Notable people ==
- Andile Khumalo (Composer and a music lecturer)
- Baby Cele (Actress)
- Big Nuz (Music group)
- Black Coffee
- Brilliant Khuzwayo (Soccer player)
- Griffiths Mxenge (anti-apartheid activist)
- Japhet Zwane (Soccer player)
- Khanyi Dhlomo
- Khaya Mthethwa (Singer & Pastor)
- Gabisile Nkosi (artist)
- Linda Sikhakhane (Saxophonist and composer)
- Linda Sokhulu (Actress)
- Okmalumkoolkat (Musician & producer)
- Promise Mthembu (HIV/AIDS activist)
- Samke Makhoba, Actress
- Senzo Meyiwa (Soccer player)
- Sifiso Mzobe (Author)
- Siyabonga Shibe (Actor)
- Usimamane (Rapper)
- Victoria Mxenge (anti-apartheid activist)
- Zanele Muholi (Artist and visual activist)
