= McCord Zulu Hospital =

Hospital in Durban, South Africa

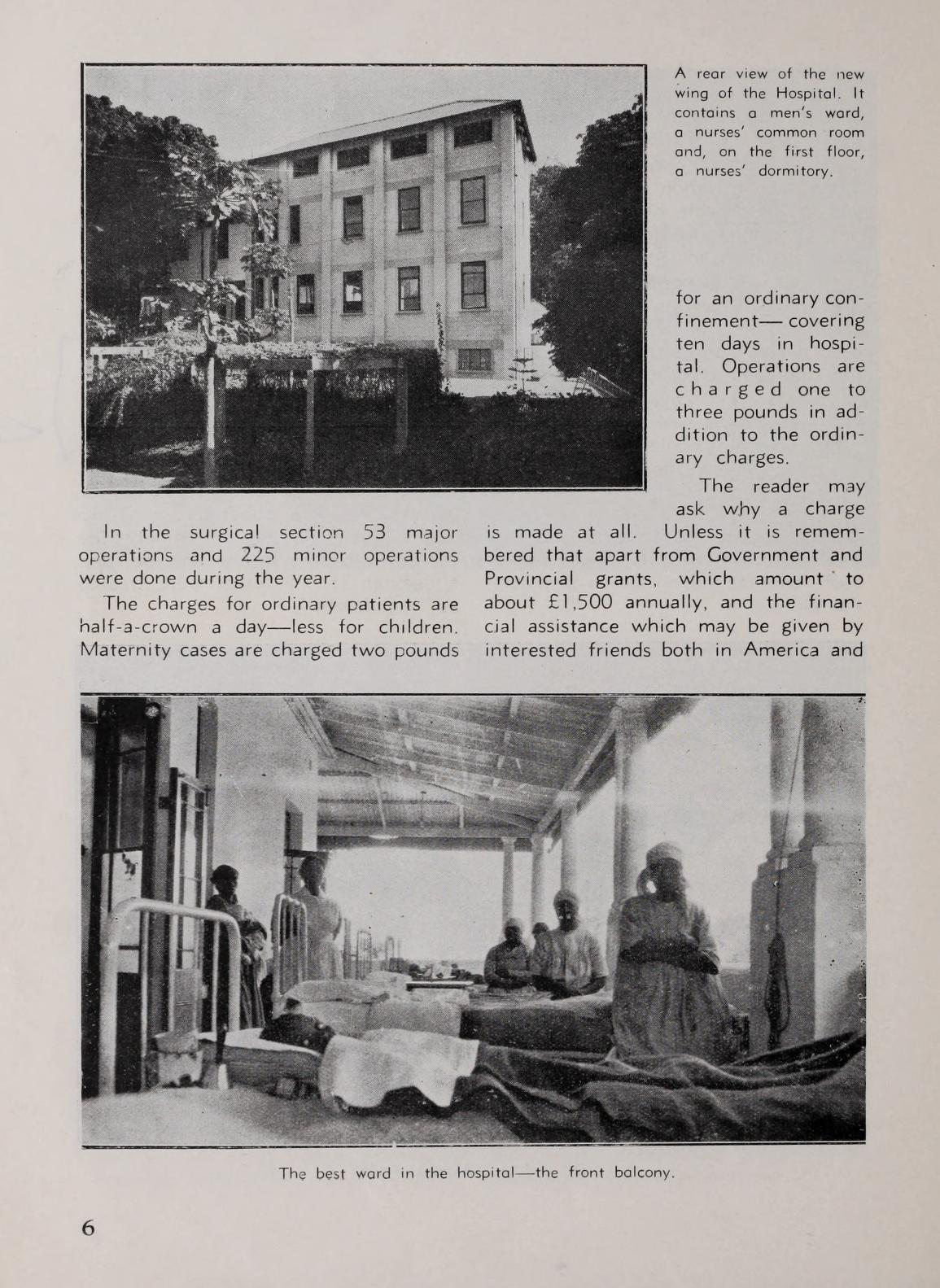
Exterior and interior views of the Hospital, before 1935

McCord's Hospital, originally McCord Zulu Hospital, is a hospital in Durban, South Africa.

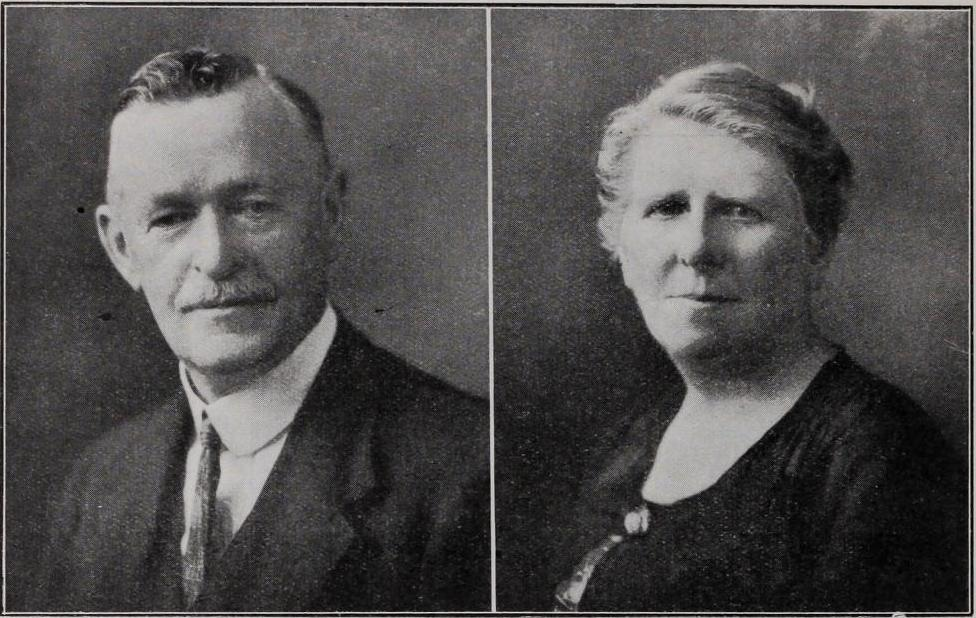
Founders James Bennett McCord and Margaret Mellen McCord, before 1935

It was founded "for the Zulu", by American Christian missionaries, physician Dr. James Bennett McCord and Margaret Mellen McCord, in 1909.

McCord Hospital shut down after 104 years in 2013 due to budget cuts by the local government.

== Sinikithemba HIV/AIDS Clinic ==
McCord Hospital's Sinikithemba HIV clinic was a President's Emergency Plan for AIDS Relief site in South Africa that treated provided antiretrovirals to both adults and children.

The Sinikithemba HIV clinic was one of the first PEPFAR sites to build an electronic medical record. The EMR system identified that nonpregnant women with an elevated mean body mass index (BMI) on the HIV antiretroviral stavudine were at a higher risk of developing lactic acidosis.

Several implementation studies were published documenting McCord Hospital's HIV antiretroviral cohorts in prestigious international journals. The Sinikithemba family centered model was also featured in a letter to the editor in The New York Times
