= Japhet Zwane =

South African soccer player

Personal information
- Full name: Japhet Phumlani Zwane
- Date of birth: 10 January 1974 (age 52)
- Place of birth: Umlazi, South Africa
- Position: Midfielder

Senior career*
Years	Team	Apps	(Gls)
1996–1998	Royal Tigers	31	(9)
1998–1999	Phoenix City	20	(6)
1999–2002	Manning Rangers	86	(4)
2002–2003	Moroka Swallows	16	(6)
2003–2005	FC Rostov	39	(0)
2005–2006	Golden Arrows	6	(0)
2006–2008	Moroka Swallows	40	(2)
2008–2010	AmaZulu	20	(0)

International career
2002–2004	South Africa	10	(1)
- * Club domestic league appearances and goals

Japhet Phumlani Zwane (born 10 January 1974) is a South African former soccer player who played as a left winger.

== Career ==
=== Club ===
On 20 February 2003, Rostselmash announced the signing of Zwane and fellow South African Rowan Hendricks.

== Career statistics ==
=== International ===
South Africa
Year	Apps	Goals
2002	5	0
2003	3	0
2004	2	0
Total	10	0

Statistics accurate as of match played 3 July 2004
