= James Bennett McCord =

American medical missionary (1870–1950)

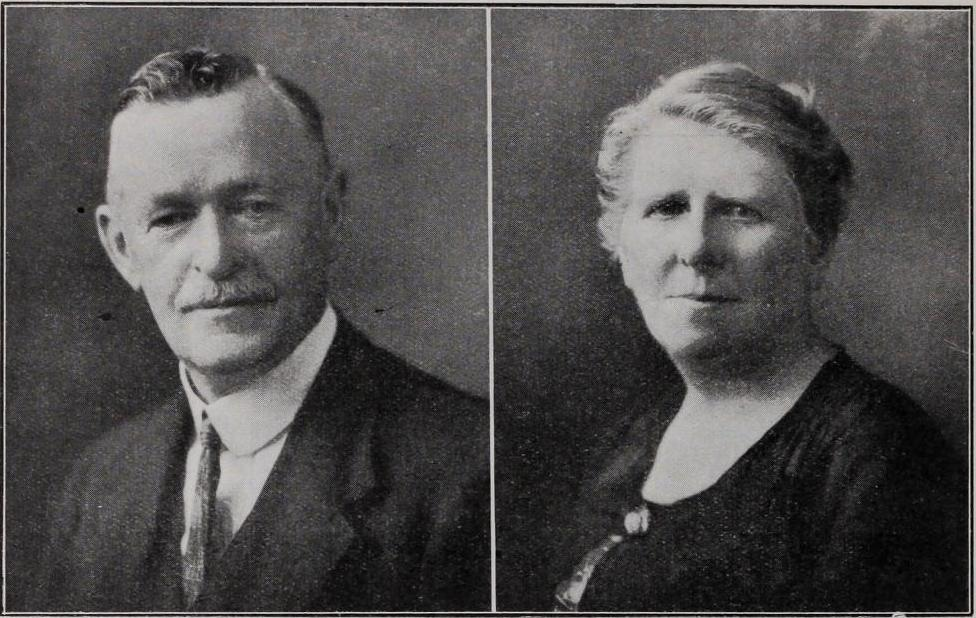
- James B. and Margaret (née Mellon) McCord, circa 1935
- Born: April 5, 1870; Toulon, Illinois, United States
- Died: October 5, 1950 (aged 80); Oakham, Massachusetts, United States
- Education: Oberlin College (BA) Northwestern University (MD) Royal College of Surgeons (MRCS, LRCP)
- Occupations: Physician, Medical Missionary, Founder and First Superintendent of McCord Zulu Hospital

James Bennett McCord (April 5, 1870 – October 5, 1950) was an American medical missionary and physician who founded the McCord Zulu Hospital and spent over three decades treating mostly African, Native, and mixed race patients in Durban, South Africa. He pioneered the training program for the first African nurses, worked towards the establishment of a medical school dedicated to training black doctors, and shared his life story in his autobiography titled My Patients Were Zulus.

== Early life and education ==
James B. McCord was born on April 5, 1870, in Toulon, Illinois, to Robert L. McCord, a Congregational minister in Iowa and Illinois, and Helen D. McCord (née Hopkins), who came from a farming and politically involved family in Illinois. McCord studied at Oberlin College’s preparatory school before continuing on to attend the college. He graduated in 1891 and then attended medical school at Northwestern University. After receiving his medical degree in 1895, he interned at Mercy Hospital in Chicago.

== Personal life ==
McCord met his wife, Margaret McCord (née Mellon), whose parents were former medical missionaries in South Africa, at Oberlin College, and they married on August 14th, 1895. They had six children together: Jessie, Mary, Robert, Laura, William, and Margaret. Unfortunately, Jessie and Laura both unexpectedly died in 1919, and although the McCords did not mention it publicly, their daughters’ deaths and the ensuing grief noticeably changed them.

McCord was an avid chess player, and he not only founded the Durban Chess Club but also actively competed in tournaments even after his retirement and return to America. He continued playing until his death and was the oldest to compete in the 1950 U.S. National Chess Championship.

== Mission ==
=== Call to Serve ===
During his time at Oberlin College, McCord worked with the Student Volunteer Movement, which inspired him to serve as a missionary. He originally wanted to serve as a minister but realized he was best suited for another job. With his wife Margaret's encouragement, he had pursued medicine in hopes of being a medical missionary. During his internship at Mercy Hospital, McCord enquired the American Board of Commissioners for Foreign Missions for a position and learned that he would not be able to get paid yet due to a lack of funding, so he ended up working in Lake City, Iowa, until 1899 when the Board notified him of a position in Natal, South Africa.

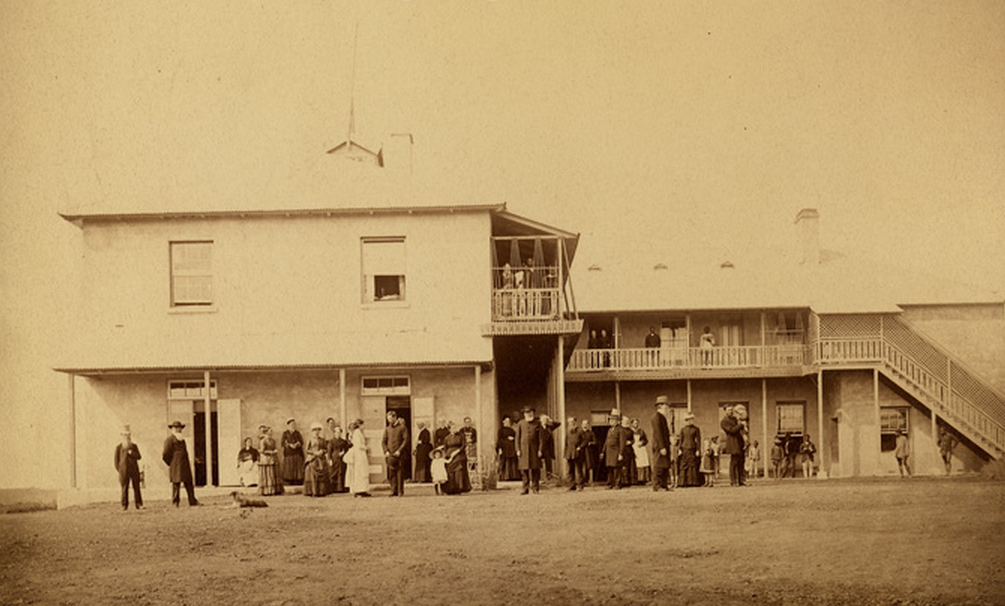
US missionaries at Jubilee Hall, Adams Mission, Amanzimtoti, South Africa, in 1886 to mark the mission's 50th anniversary

=== Adams Mission ===
McCord began learning isiZulu, the Zulu language, for a year, and after, he intended to take over and run the Adams Mission, which was previously managed by Dr. B.N. Bridgman until 1898, in Amanzimtoti, South Africa. However, a new law mandated that a British medical degree was required to practice medicine in Natal, so McCord studied at the Royal College of Surgeons in London, England from 1901 to 1902.

Upon returning to Natal in 1902, it was clear that Adams Mission's location was inaccessible for many patients, as they traveled far to receive care. As word spread about McCord's successful work, more patients journeyed to come see him, and by 1903, McCord was treating 400 patients a month.

=== Early Years in Durban, South Africa ===
The McCords were especially convinced to move their practice because of one patient who died from dysentery after walking 30 km (19 mi) to Adams Mission for treatment. Durban, South Africa was considered to be a more suitable location, since it was a growing city and closer to a greater population of African, Native, and mixed race people that McCord wanted to serve. In 1904, on 76 Beatrice Street, Greyville, the McCords opened a dispensary, with multiple medicine and consulting rooms, as well as a waiting room, a space reserved for multiple purposes from religious services (since religion was heavily integrated into the dispensary's operations) to evening school. In the first year of operation, more than 4,000 people visited the dispensary to seek treatment, and there was a wide range of conditions seen, including but not limited to indigestion, pneumonia, malaria, and tuberculosis.

=== McCord Zulu Hospital ===
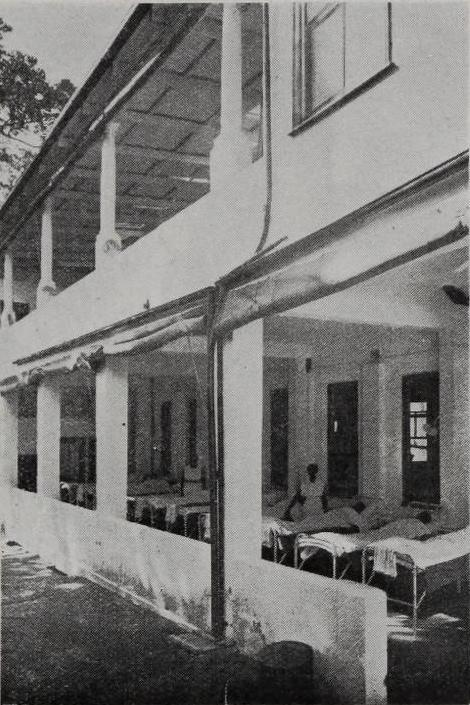
McCord Hospital verandah and balcony

From when they first moved to Durban to when they continued to work at the dispensary, the McCords realized the need for a hospital, so they rented a house close to the dispensary. It only had a capacity of twelve patients and even with no staff to help, this cottage hospital served 900 patients in its first three months open. The McCords wanted to expand and open a larger hospital, but they faced several challenges along the way. In addition to needing funding and additional staff, there was tension between them and the white residents and even other doctors in the area, as they strongly opposed a hospital dedicated to providing care for Africans. This led to three years of court battles after the McCords bought a plot of land on the outskirts of Durban, due to their inability to afford a place closer to the dispensary. Even the Supreme Court of Natal became involved, but eventually, the McCords were allowed to follow through with their plans for a 48-bed hospital. The new hospital, originally known as Mission Nursing Home, opened on May 1, 1909, and its name only changed to McCord Zulu Hospital in 1935.

==== Hospital Culture ====
The McCord Zulu Hospital had a unique culture centering around the ‘McCord Family,’ which was built on Christianity and a general dedication to service, and it was a key element that motivated its staff and patients to come there, rather than other healthcare centers, for work and treatment. It also most likely played a part in the hospital's longevity and successful resistance to outside pressures, especially in the transition and aftermath of an apartheid state. Nurses were held to high standards, morally and religiously, and were often supervised to ensure that they continued fulfilling their jobs to the level expected of them. McCord himself notes the importance of the ‘McCord Family’ in his book My Patients Were Zulus, describing the ‘McCord nurse’ to be a balanced, self-respecting, and aware woman. Specifically, the three pillars that separated them from other nurses were prayer, staff selection, and discipline. McCord, and his successor, Dr. Alan B. Taylor, considered themselves to be father figures who took care of the rest of the staff, while their wives, Margaret and Mary Taylor, respectively, were the Matrons who took on the role of the motherly figure. There was a hierarchy based on the positions people worked in, but the staff still enjoyed events together, were invested in each other's lives, and acted like a family.

==== HIV Pandemic ====
When the HIV pandemic swept across sub-Saharan Africa, with 70% of the affected 42 million living in this region and the KwaZulu-Natal province being the epicenter in South Africa, the McCord Zulu Hospital set up the Sinikithemba (or ‘we give hope’ in Zulu) HIV clinic and implemented comprehensive treatment programs in 1996. These efforts led it to be a prominent, leading center for HIV care in South Africa.

==== Transition to Government ownership and control ====
The McCord Zulu Hospital grew to include over 400 staff and 140 beds, becoming one of largest hospitals in the KwaZulu-Natal province. Unfortunately, however, a cut in funding, initially from international sources in 2012 and then from the government in 2013, meant that it would not be able to stay open, because as a nonprofit hospital, it only continued to operate by receiving state aid and fundraising to compensate for the minimal fees patients had to pay. Despite the hospital's dedication since its establishment to provide quality care to the less privileged (extending to those without health insurance in recent decades) and widespread public backlash to keep it open as a semi-private hospital and intermediary between the expensive private facilities and the public hospitals that were operating with the new National Health Insurance plan, the McCord Zulu Hospital officially closed in March 2013, after being open for 104 years. Under the direction of Dr. Sibongiseni Dhlomo, a KwaZulu-Natal Executive Council Member, the province's Department of Health took over the hospital in 2014 and transformed it into the McCord Provincial Eye Hospital, where it continues to provide care in Durban today.

=== Training and Education Initiatives ===
From the start when the McCord Zulu Hospital opened, McCord was dedicated to training Africans to be healthcare personnel. The first nurse he trained was Katie Makanya, who was crucial for the mission's success. She was also his assistant, translator, and interpreter, and as a Zulu, she bridged the gap between the local patients and McCord. Makanya worked at the Beatrice Street Dispensary from 1904 to 1940, and her story is the subject of the book The Calling of Katie Makanya, written by Margaret (Peggy) McCord-Nixon, McCord's youngest daughter.

One motivation behind McCord's desire to medically train Africans was noted in his article "Medical missionary work among the Zulus of Natal, South Africa," which was that training Africans to be nurses and missionaries would combat any harm perpetuated by witch-doctors. Another factor was the potential to increase the number of medical providers, allowing a full staff to be not only at the McCord Hospital and Dispensary but also other healthcare centers in the area, expanding the quality care given to local patients.

McCord served in the American army during World War I, and that is where he met Dr. Alan B. Taylor, who proved to be an important colleague, collaborator, and McCord's successor as superintendent of McCord Zulu Hospital. They both were committed to providing medical training for Africans, despite resistance they faced that hindered their efforts. As their proposals for a medical school kept getting blocked, in the interim, they decided to focus on an initiative to train African nurses, and in 1924, the McCord Zulu Hospital became one of the first official training hospitals for them. This inspired other Natal mission hospitals to include training schools, and by the 1930s, around 70 such institutions were established for nurses and midwives, although McCord's remained one of the two schools dedicated to black nurses. McCord and Taylor's relentless work eventually culminated in the opening of the Non-European Medical School of the University of Natal, of which Taylor was the dean, in 1951 after McCord's death.

McCord was heavily involved in multiple organizations in Durban. He was the president of the Durban Medical Society for four years; a member of the Joint Council for Europeans and Non-Europeans, the Institute of Race Relations, the Natal Missionary Conference, and the General Missionary Conference of South Africa; and chairman of the American Board Mission in South Africa, all in the pursuit to better advocate for Africans, whether it be for education, wages, or training.

=== Retirement and Return ===
McCord took several furloughs throughout his decades-long tenure in South Africa, including in 1909 (when he returned to America due to his father's poor health), 1917, and 1927. He and Margaret permanently moved back to the states when he retired at seventy years old in 1940. They stayed in Oakham, Massachusetts, where McCord died in his sleep on October 5, 1950, and was later buried in Pine Grove Cemetery.

== Legacy ==
McCord's lifelong work, passion for education, and committed service to the people in South Africa led to a nursing school, the Durban Medical School (now Nelson R. Mandela School of Medicine of the University of KwaZulu-Natal), a longstanding hospital (now McCord Provincial Eye Hospital), and allowed for the treatments and trainings of thousands of patients and healthcare professionals. In the six years alone from when he first moved to Durban to when he left for his first furlough, McCord had already served 15,000 patients.

The McCord Zulu Hospital has been well-known and respected for its high-quality care, extensive training programs, and dedicated treatment to the African and Native people in South Africa. The hospital has provided training and experience for many healthcare professionals, and notable alumni include Dr. J. Ndlovu, KwaZulu-Natal's first African psychiatrist; Dr. Zweli Mkhize, KwaZulu-Natal's former Minister of Health; Professor M.W. Makgoba, University of Natal's Vice Chancellor; and Professor D.J. Ncayiyana, Durban Institute of Technology's Chancellor and South African Medical Journal’s Editor. It is the only hospital to have survived the apartheid rule and the resulting efforts to shut down an organization mainly serving Africans in a majority white area.

McCord published his autobiography My Patients were Zulus in 1946, and his other publications include "A Native Medical Service in South Africa" and "Native Witch Doctors and Healers." He elevated the medical care provided to nonwhite patients, and his efforts have left a long-lasting impact in South Africa, extending to present day.
