= Inviolata Mbwavi =

Kenyan HIV-activist (1972–2020)

in 2013

Inviolata Mbwavi (1972 – 29 July 2020) was a Kenyan HIV activist.

== Career ==
Mbwavi was the first Chief Executive of the National Empowerment Network of People Living with HIV in Kenya (NEPHAK). She was the Kenyan co-ordinator for International Community of Women Living with HIV/AIDS. She successfully led a project funded by the Global Fund working to support HIV positive people in Kenya.

Mbwavi was a critic of HIV responses that failed to determine the gendered reasons behind why more women and girls lived with HIV than men and boys in Kenya. She campaigned publicly against the coerced sterilisation of women in Kenya with HIV. She was also a keen proponent of involving civil society and communities in tackling the HIV pandemic and challenging stigma and violence towards people who have the virus including supporting legal action. In 2006 she led a movement against a new Kenyan law that sought to 'criminalise' HIV.

== Personal life ==
Mbwavi was diagnosed with HIV just after her 20th birthday in 1992. In an interview she reported that stigma around HIV had led to pressure from her partner's family to end her relationship with him.

She had one daughter.
