= International Community of Women Living with HIV/AIDS =

Charitable organization based in the UK

The International Community of Women Living with HIV/AIDS (ICW), a registered UK charity, is an international network run for and by HIV positive women. ICW was established to support programs designed to safeguard and improve the quality of life for women living with HIV.

ICW Global operates in 120 countries through ten regional networks, including North America and Eastern Africa networks.

== Formation ==
ICW was formed by a group of HIV positive women from many different countries attending the 8th International Conference on AIDS held in Amsterdam in July 1992. HIV positive women shared stories and strategies for coping and devised action plans for the future. An important achievement at this first ICW pre-conference was drawing up the "Twelve Statements". These statements relate to the issues and needs facing all women living with HIV worldwide and form the basis of the organisation's philosophy. During this meeting, the women agreed that they did not want to lose this momentum and ICW was created.

== Purpose ==
ICW is an international network run for and by HIV positive women that promotes and advocates for changes that improve the lives of HIV positive women and gives them a voice. Over the course of its 20-year existence, ICW has been a unified force for women living with HIV. ICW has made a significant impact in international forums, winning a voting position on the International AIDS Conference Coordinating Committee and Consultative Status at the UN Economic and Social Council. Their global advocacy program ensures that women living with HIV have a voice in the creation of policy that affects their lives and fights for the needs of women, young women, adolescents, and girls living with HIV in significant global decision-making arenas.

== Funding ==
ICW is financially supported by many organisations, trusts and foundations. The major ones include DANIDA, NOVIB and UNAIDS. Project-specific grants have recently been provided by Comic Relief and the UK Government through the Department for International Development.

== In Kenya ==
The National coordinator in Kenya until 2020 was Inviolata Mbwavi.

== See also ==
- Global Network of People living with HIV/AIDS
