= Amanzimtoti River =

Coordinates: 30°03′S 30°53′E

Amanzimtoti River aManzimtoti
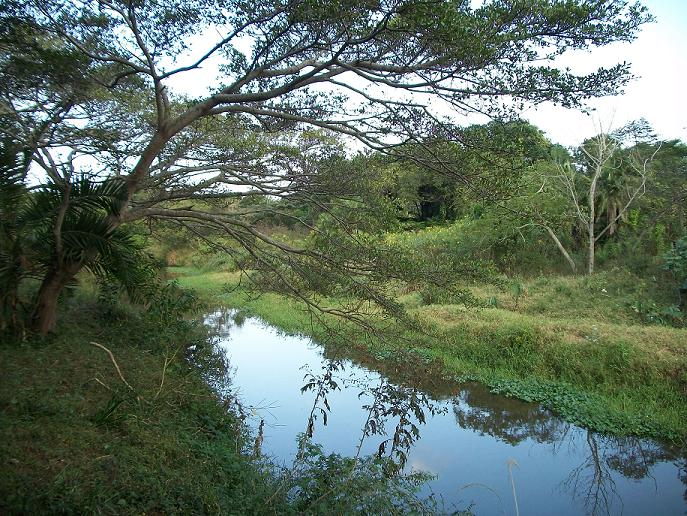
- Amanzimtoti River at the lower parking area of Ilanda Wilds

Location
- Country: South Africa
- Location: KwaZulu-Natal

Physical characteristics
- Mouth
  - location: Indian Ocean

Amanzimtoti River, also known as aManzimtoti River (which is its official name), is a short river in the KwaZulu-Natal province of South Africa, that originates northwest of Adams Mission, and flows through the town of eManzimtoti, South Africa. The N2 crosses the river just before its mouth at the Indian Ocean. (coordinates river mouth see Manzimtoti Lagoon). The river also pass through the sacred waterfall of Adams Mission.

== Etymology ==
Zulu king Shaka is said to have named the river after drinking the waters and exclaiming in isiZulu "Kanti amanzi mtoti" meaning "So, the water is sweet". The river came to be known to English speakers as Amanzimtoti ("Sweet Waters"). The Zulu word for "sweet" is mnandi, but Shaka's mother had the name Nandi, so he is said to have invented the word 'toti' to replace mnandi, so as not to wear out her name.

Recently it has been proposed to officially change the name to aManzamtoti to more accurately reflect the isiZulu pronunciation and spelling, though many Amanzimtoti residents still refer to the river as Amanzimtoti River, Manzimtoti River or simply Toti River.

A recent alternative, and unpopular, suggestion for the origin of the name of the river is in the isiZulu word 'udoti' meaning dirt, which fits more closely with 'toti', and that the name actually means "Dirty Water".

== History ==
The river was once flanked by extensive marsh-lands and reed-beds, but these were filled in to build the town centre and a rubbish dump. The rubbish dump was later covered over and developed into sports fields.

At one time it was possible to travel by boat from the town centre to the River Gardens Hotel, which was a popular Sunday activity. Siltation eventually made this impossible, until the river was dredged a number of times in the 1990s. However the dredging process was seen by some conservationists as destructive, and by others as expensive. The river has once again silted to a large extent.

The river is now flanked in a portion by a nature reserve called Ilanda Wilds. The river and nature reserve are home to a number of rare and endangered species, and high biodiversity compared to the size of the area.

The river stream is located in the cane lands of Sawpits Area at Umbumbulu in the north west of Adams Mission

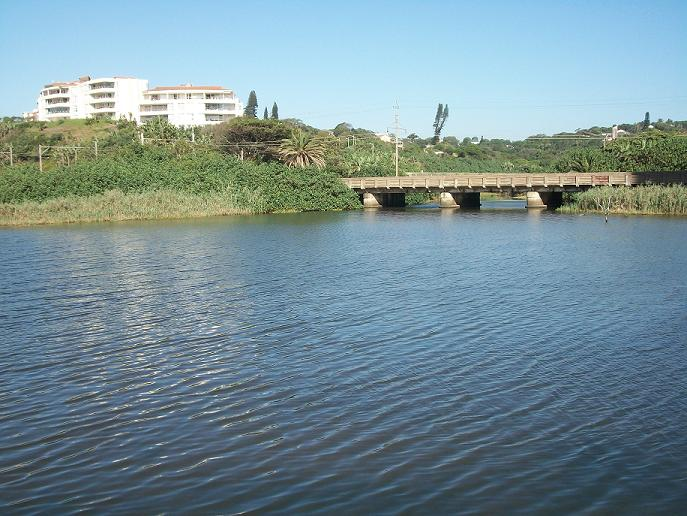
aManzimtoti Lagoon

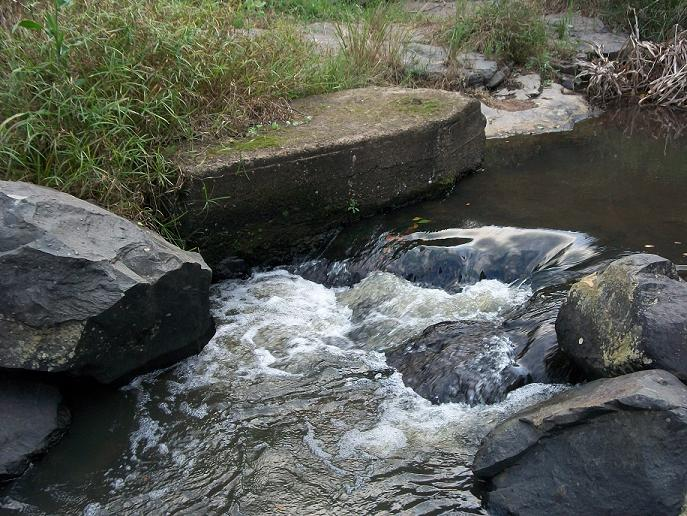
aManzimtoti River at Ilanda Wilds

== See also ==
- List of lagoons of South Africa
