= Old Fort (Durban) =

Historical building in South Africa

The Old Fort is a fort built in Durban, South Africa by Captain Thomas Charlton Smith's troops in 1842 as part of a visibility campaign by the British Empire to prevent Boers from establishing a republic in Natal. The facility was equipped with an arsenal and barracks in 1858, and troops were stationed there until the end of the century.
