= Athlone Park =

- Location within KwaZulu-Natal Location within South Africa
- Coordinates: 30.016°S 30.921°E
- Country: South Africa
- Province: KwaZulu-Natal
- Municipality: eThekwini
- Main Place: Durban
- Established: 1902
  - Councillor: (DA)

Area
  - Total: 4.35 km^{2} (1.68 sq mi)

Population (2011)
  - Total: 3,818
  - Density: 878/km^{2} (2,270/sq mi)

Racial makeup (2011)
  - Black African: 23.6%
  - Coloured: 1.4%
  - Indian/Asian: 19.3%
  - White: 55.3%
  - Other: 0.4%

First languages (2011)
  - English: 63.7%
  - Afrikaans: 17.2%
  - Zulu: 15.4%
  - Xhosa: 1.0%
  - Other: 2.7%
- Time zone: UTC+2 (SAST)
- Postal code (street): 4126
- Area code: 031

Athlone Park is a small coastal suburb located between Durban and Amanzimtoti in KwaZulu-Natal, South Africa. Considered as one of Amanzimtoti's most sought-after suburbs, Athlone Park forms part of the eThekwini Metropolitan Municipality as a Southern Suburb.

== Geography ==
Athlone Park lies on the mouth of the eZimbokodweni River, approximately 19 kilometres (12 miles) south of Durban and 7 kilometres (4 miles) north of the eManzimtoti CBD. It sits between the Indian Ocean to the east, Prospecton to the north, Lotus Park to the north-west, Umbogintwini to the west and eManzimtoti to the south.

== Transport ==
The N2 freeway connects Durban to the north with Port Shepstone to the south with an off-ramp connecting to Athlone Park at Dickens Road. Locally, Dickens Road connects the suburb with Umbogintwini, while the R102 (Andrew Zondo Road) follows the coastline from Prospecton in the north to Amanzimtoti in the south.
