= Prospecton =

- Location within KwaZulu-Natal Location within South Africa
- Coordinates: 29°59′43″S 30°55′59″E
- Country: South Africa
- Province: KwaZulu-Natal
- Municipality: eThekwini
- Main Place: Durban

Area
  - Total: 4.64 km^{2} (1.79 sq mi)

Population (2011)
  - Total: 0
  - Density: 0.0/km^{2} (0.0/sq mi)

Racial makeup (2011)

First languages (2011)
- Time zone: UTC+2 (SAST)
- Postal code (street): 4133

Prospecton is an industrial suburb located south of Durban in KwaZulu-Natal, South Africa.

== History ==
Since 1931, the open flat undeveloped land of Prospecton which separates the two residential areas of Isipingo, Isipingo Rail inland and Isipingo Beach on the coast, was under the administration of the Isipingo Rail Health Committee. This was until the 1960s when it began developing and was declared a "White" industrial area therefore it placed under the Borough of Amanzimtoti.

Many residents of Isipingo disagreed with the administration of Prospecton being under Amanzimtoti and the Isipingo Town Council petitioned the Natal Provincial Administration (NPA) frequently from 1976 to 1986 to incorporate Prospecton into Isipingo. The NPA maintained that, because Prospecton had been declared a "White" industrial township by the South African government, the province could not declare it part of Isipingo as it was an "Indian" area.

== Location ==
Prospecton is situated approximately 19 kilometres (12 mi) south-west of the Durban CBD, bordered by the defunct Durban International Airport to the north, Isipingo Beach to the east, Athlone Park to the south, Lotus Park to the south-west and Isipingo Rail to the west. It forms part of the South Durban Basin, a heavily industrialised region south of Durban.

== Economy ==
Prospecton is a major industrial centre, being home to many large industries with largest of these industries being the Toyota South Africa's assembly plant, the only Toyota assembly plant in Africa.

== Transport ==
Prospecton is bisected by the N2 freeway which runs through the area in a north–south direction from Durban to Port Shepstone with interchanges at Prospecton Road and Joyner Road. The R102 (Prospecton Road) is the main local route through Prospecton, connecting it with Athlone Park to the south and Isipingo Rail to the west.
