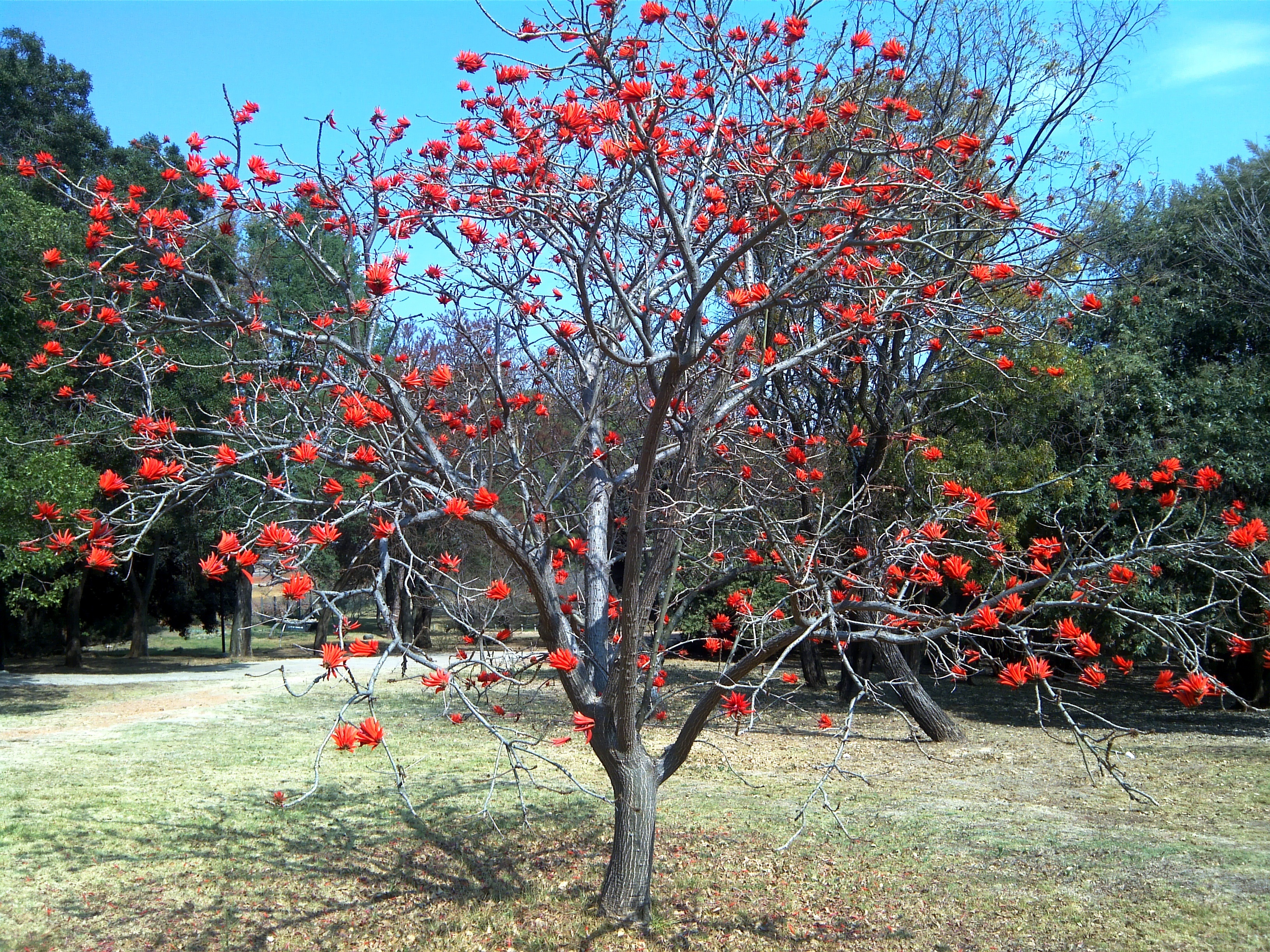

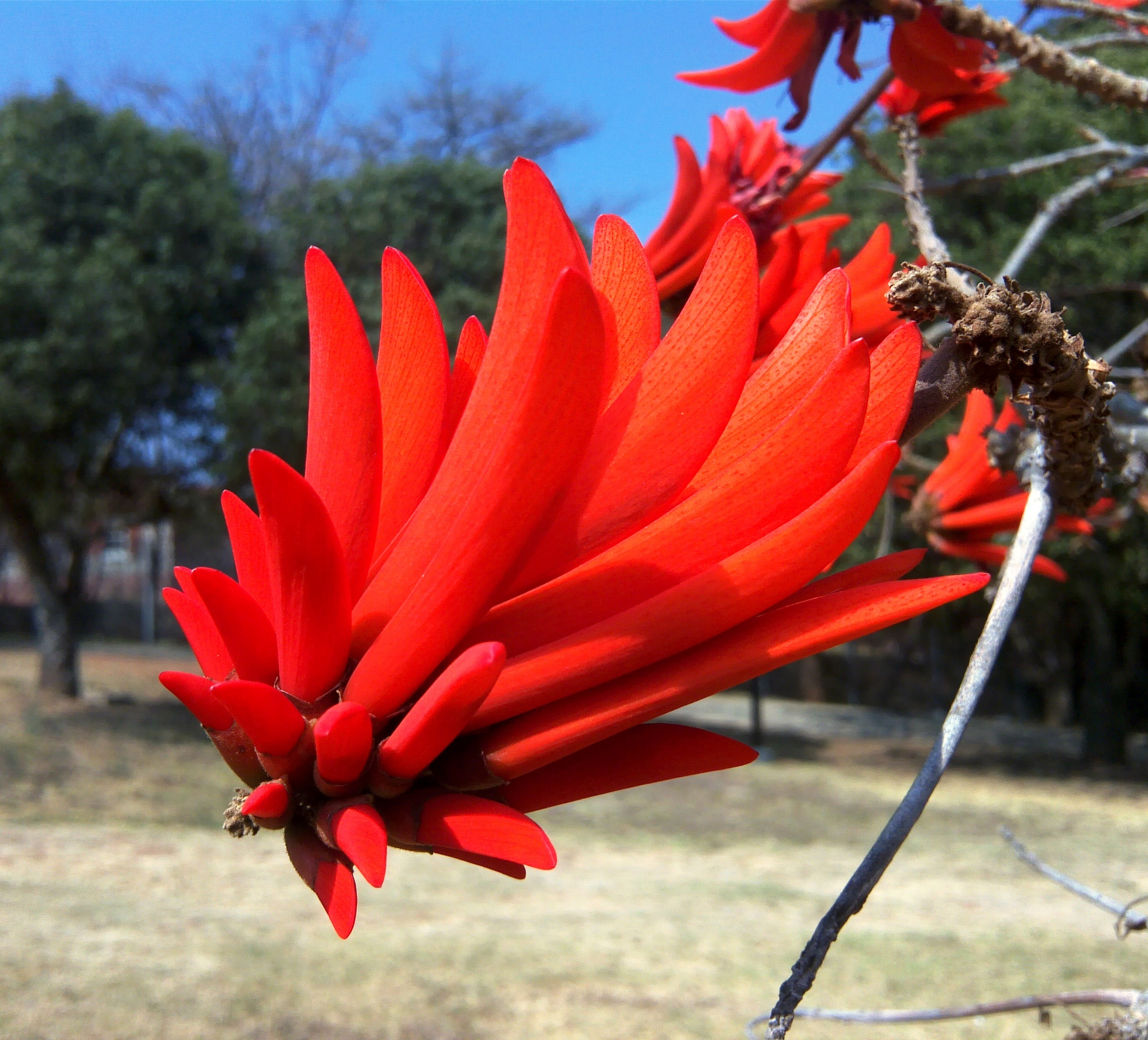
- Habit and inflorescence

Conservation status
- Least Concern (IUCN 3.1)

Scientific classification
- Kingdom: Plantae
- Clade: Tracheophytes
- Clade: Angiosperms
- Clade: Eudicots
- Clade: Rosids
- Order: Fabales
- Family: Fabaceae
- Subfamily: Faboideae
- Genus: Erythrina
- Species: E. lysistemon

Binomial name
- Erythrina lysistemon Hutch.

Synonyms
- Erythrina afra var. mossambicensis Baker f.

= Erythrina lysistemon =

Common coral-tree

Species of legume

Erythrina lysistemon is a species of deciduous tree in the pea family, Fabaceae. It is native to South Africa. Common names include common coral-tree, lucky bean tree, umsintsi (Xhosa), muvhale (Venda), mophete (Tswana), koraalboom or kanniedood (Afrikaans), mokhungwane (Sotho) and mutiti (Shona). It is regularly cultivated as a tree for gardens and parks.

== Description ==
Common coral tree reaches 30 to 40 ft (9.1 to 12.2 m) in height, with smooth grayish bark, not corky; hooked prickles scattered on trunk and branches; leaves with 3 leaflets, up to 7 in (18 cm) long, petiole and midrib prickly. The tree is leafless for up to 4 or 5 months of the year. The lovely scarlet red flowers are borne in dense racemes in spring before leaves and attract numerous birds and insects to the garden. It is hardy to USDA Zone 9b.

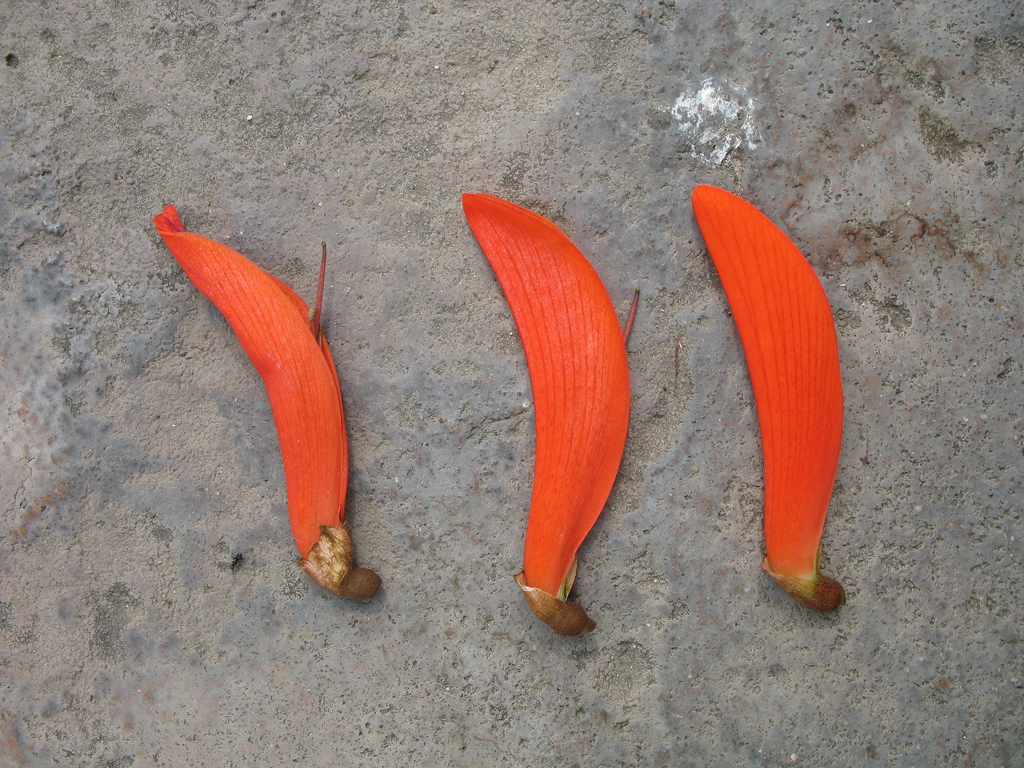
flowers

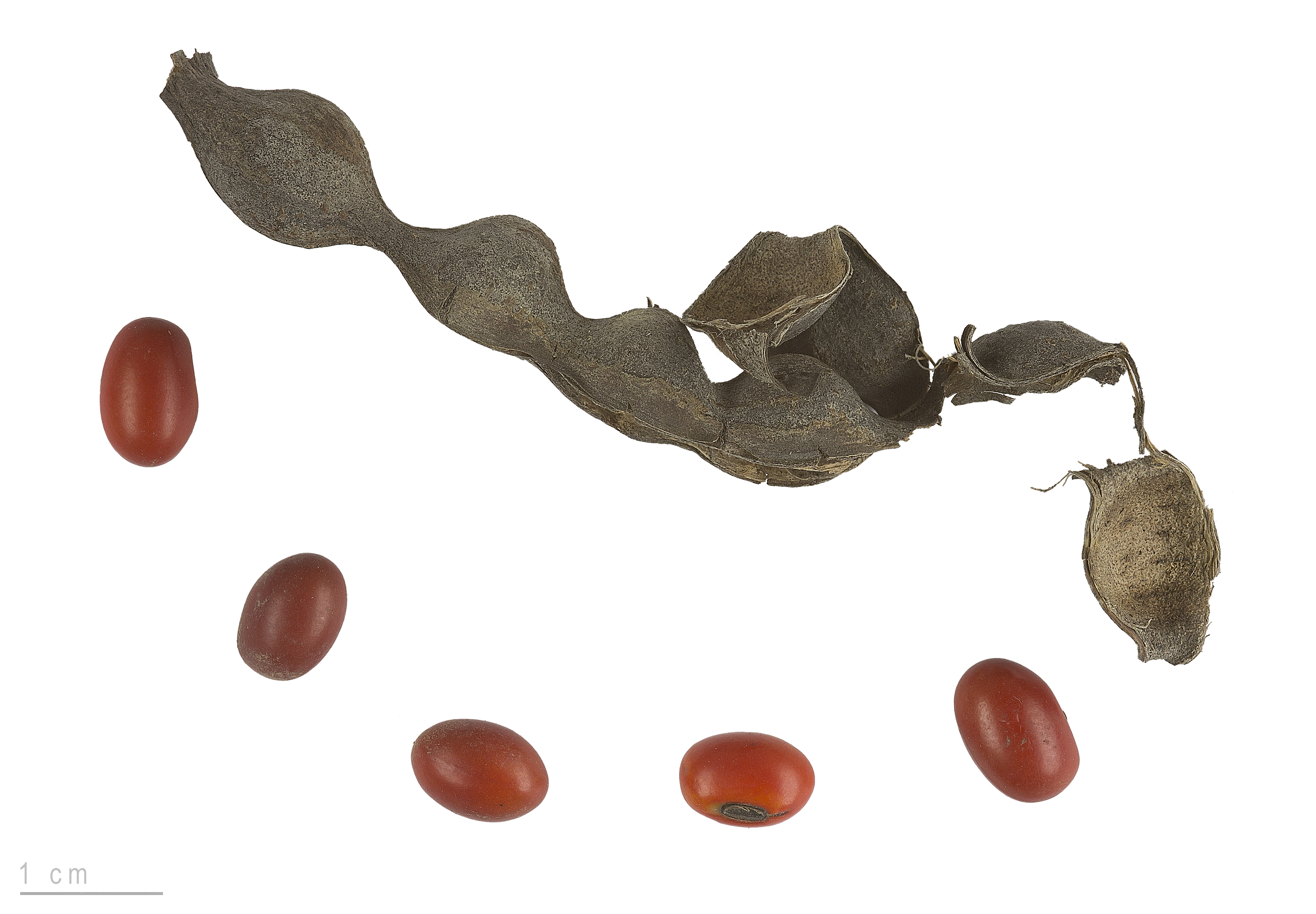
Seed pod and seeds - MHNT

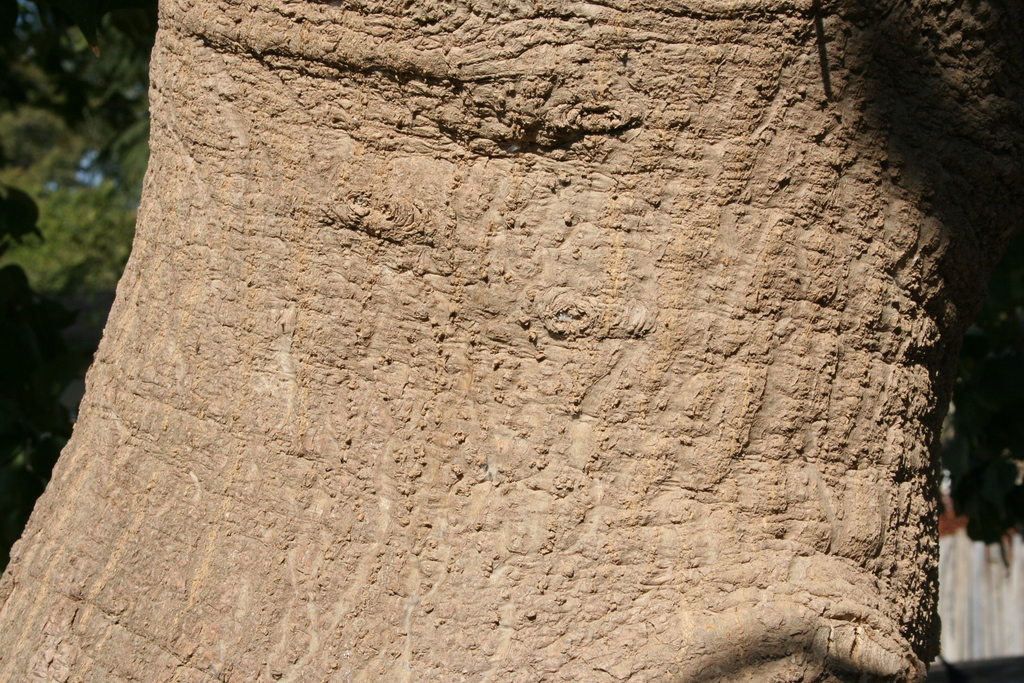
dry bark

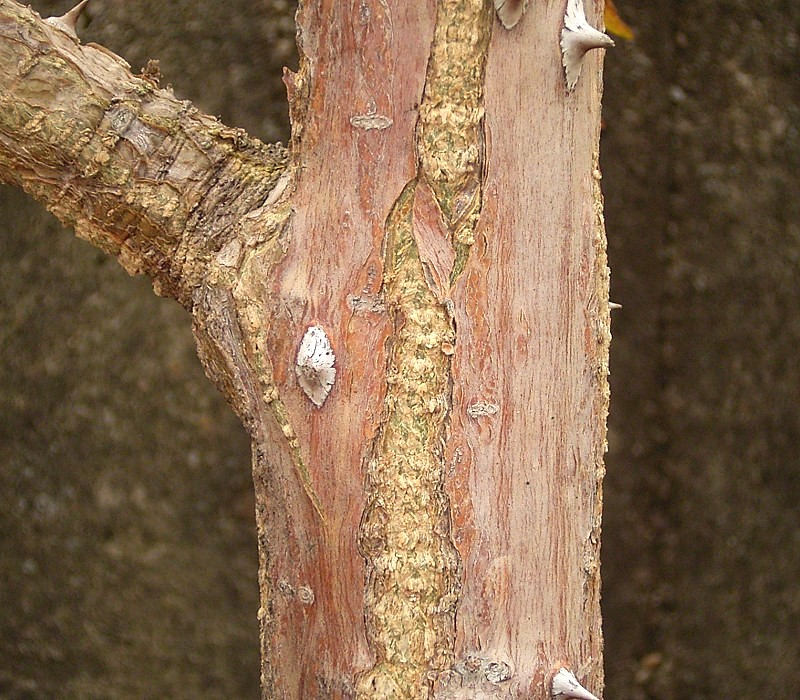
stem with thorns

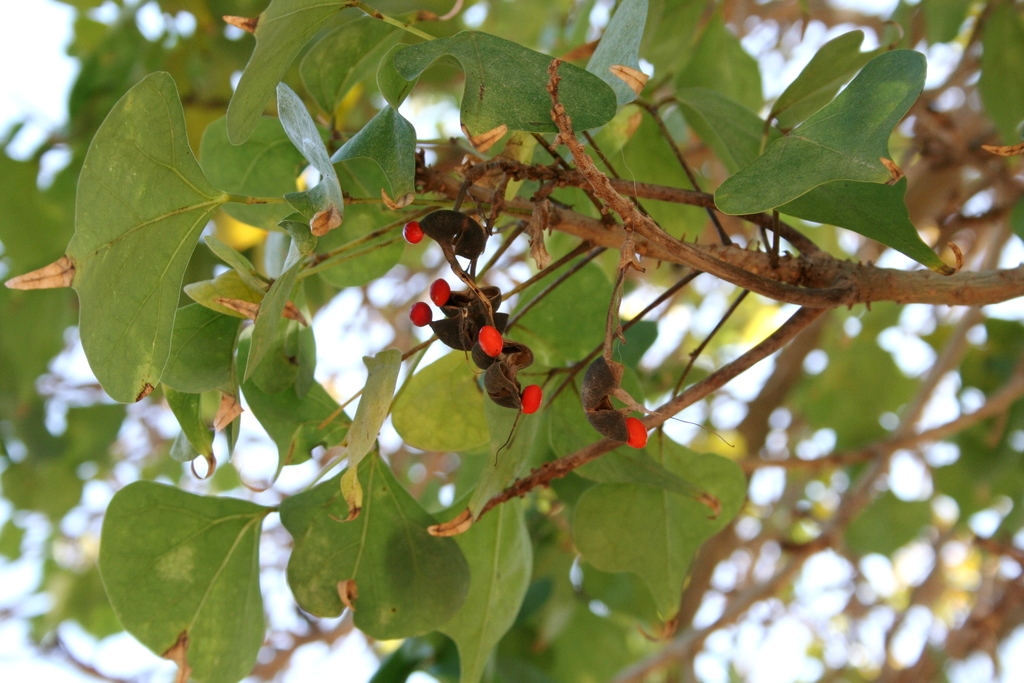
foliage and seed pods
