= Adams Mission =

- Location within KwaZulu-Natal Location within South Africa
- Coordinates: 30.034°S 30.815°E
- Country: South Africa
- Province: KwaZulu-Natal
- Municipality: eThekwini

Area
  - Total: 1.88 km^{2} (0.73 sq mi)

Population (2011)
  - Total: 770
  - Density: 410/km^{2} (1,100/sq mi)

Racial makeup (2011)
  - Black African: 99.9%
  - White: 0.1%

First languages (2011)
  - Zulu: 95.1%
  - English: 1.7%
  - Xhosa: 1.2%
  - Other: 2.1%
- Time zone: UTC+2 (SAST)
- Postal code (street): 4110
- PO box: 4100

Adams Mission is a town in eThekwini in the KwaZulu-Natal province of South Africa. The settlement is situated west of KwaMakhutha and Amanzimtoti and south of Durban.

== History ==
Established in 1836 as a Medical mission, the settlement was destroyed by the Zulu king Dingaan, but rebuilt in 1839. Named after the American missionary Dr Newton Adams who arrived in Natal in 1835 and who played a prominent role in respect to this mission. The mission was operated by Dr. B.N. Bridgman until 1898, in Amanzimtoti, South Africa. Dr. James Bennett McCord took over leadership of the mission in 1899 and then 1902. The mission was noted to be far from the population of Durban by McCord.

The mission also built and operated Adams College. Adams College is an important educational institution. Adams College has educated multiple Presidents, Ministers and has had a Nobel Laureate on its staff. it has educated the likes of Robert Mugabe who later became the leader of Zanu PF as such this relationship between the mission and politics made it the Birth Place of the ANC.

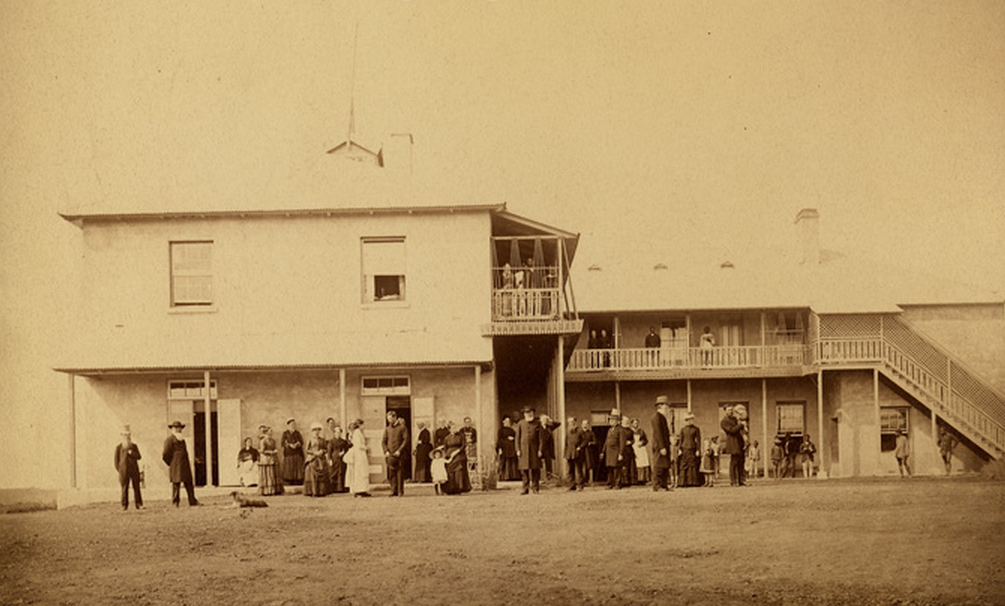
Adams Mission: Side view of Jubilee Hall with missionaries in front - dated 1886 to mark the 50th anniversary of the mission arriving.
