= HIV-positive people =

People infected with human immunodeficiency virus (HIV)

HIV-positive people, seropositive people or people who live with HIV are people infected with the human immunodeficiency virus (HIV), a retrovirus which if untreated may progress to acquired immunodeficiency syndrome (AIDS).

According to estimates by the World Health Organization (WHO) and the Joint United Nations Programme on HIV/AIDS (UNAIDS), 38.4 million people were infected with HIV at the end of 2021. That same year, some 1.5 million people became newly infected, and 650,000 died of AIDS-related causes, including 98,000 children. More than two-thirds of new HIV infections are in sub-Saharan Africa.

== Testing and awareness ==
Infection with HIV is determined by an HIV test. As of 2021, 85% of all people living with HIV knew their status.

The Joint United Nations Program on HIV/AIDS (UNAIDS), Amnesty International, the Global Network of Sex Work Projects and the Global Network of People Living with HIV/AIDS, have all condemned forced HIV testing actions as infringements on human rights and conflicting with proven public health measures that are successful in preventing HIV transmission. Sex workers in Malawi and Greece have been forced to undergo HIV testing and those who tested HIV-positive were criminalized. Stigmatizing measures discourage HIV-positive people from seeking voluntary and confidential counseling, testing and treatment.

In Understanding Positive Women's Realities, Emma Bell and Luisa Orza argue HIV and sexual and reproductive health programmes and policies fail to recognize the complexity of HIV-positive people's lives and the context in which their sexual and reproductive choices are situated. Services do not prepare people for the consequences of a positive result of an HIV test. In many cases, service users are not taken into account and are forced to undergo an AIDS test without prior consent.

== Gender and diagnosis ==
Diagnosis and gender play corresponding roles in recognizing the lives of those who live with HIV/AIDS. Women have not been diagnosed as early as men because their symptoms were not as obvious and doctors were not as likely to search for the disease in them as they are for men. This has also been based on the fact that far more men than women participated in clinical trials and women were therefore under-represented. Barbara Ogur has pointed out that the stigma of illegal drug use and multiple partners has also led to a lack of care and noticeability for women.

Among the women who were diagnosed with HIV/AIDS in the United States in 2009, 64% were Black, 18% were Hispanic, 15% were White, and 1% were Native Alaskan or Native American. Far more women contract the disease through heterosexual contact than men.

== Seronegative conversion ==
As of April 2020, there have been two reported cases of individuals being completely cured of this disease. The first case was Timothy Ray Brown, known as "The Berlin Patient", who was cured in 2007. The second was Adam Castillejo, known as "The London Patient", who was cured in March 2020. Both of these patients were cured with stem cell transplants from the bone marrow of a donor who was immune to AIDS due to a genetic mutation.

Among long-term nonprogressors, those who can maintain very low levels of viral loads, there have been reports of cases of individuals who have undetectable levels. Loreen Willenberg from the United States was announced as the first such case in 2019 and in 2021 another case from Argentina dubbed "the Esperanza patient".

== Organizations ==
Over the years of coping with the stigma and discrimination that accompany the diagnosis in most societies, a large number of support groups have been formed. In these groups, the term most often applied to people who are HIV-positive is "People Living With HIV/AIDS". This is often abbreviated as "PLWHA" or "PLHIV". Recently, "People Living Positively" has also been used.

The largest and oldest of the worldwide networks of people infected with HIV is the Global Network of People living with HIV/AIDS (GNP+), which has affiliate networks on every continent.

== Relationship issues ==
For women who are HIV-positive and also in relationships, sexual expression and communication may become an issue of conflict. Their natural human desires of love, trust and intimacy might go unrecognized in programs such as ABC (Abstinence, Being faithful, Condom use) and as a member of the ICW (International Community of Women Living with HIV/AIDS) stated at the International AIDS conference in 2006 "we need to bring love back into the whole thing."

Each individual deals with an HIV diagnosis and their post-diagnosis sexual activity in different ways. Some individuals with HIV may decide to practice abstinence, while others may continue to have sex. An ICW member from Zimbabwe stated at a session in Toronto that her "relationship ended, and I spent the next four years celibate," while an ICW member in the United Kingdom found that she preferred the use of condoms and "in some ways [HIV] has made me more assertive sexually." It is vital to note that a positive diagnosis of the disease does not only affect illegal drug users or promiscuous individuals and that their basic sexual desires do not fade.

According to Emma Bell and Luisa Orza in Understanding Positive Women's Realities, there is a need for service providers to understand women's relationships impact on their ability to access treatment and other health services. In many cases, HIV-positive realities include husbands or partners who have not or are unwilling to be tested for HIV forcing their HIV-positive spouse into giving them their ARV dose.

== Stigma ==
Stigma attached with the disease makes it particularly harder for children living with HIV and their caregivers. Caregiving goes beyond the child-caregiver dynamic, and is intertwined with the local community and the healthcare and support system structures.

Movies such as Philadelphia (1993), which followed the story of a gay, HIV-positive lawyer played by Tom Hanks, helped counteract stigma towards those living with HIV and made the topic less taboo. As HIV advocate Gary Bell claims: "I remember there was quite a buzz about it. I think the good news was that it got people talking about HIV in a way that they really weren't, because HIV was always that thing we really didn't want to talk about."

== See also ==
- List of HIV-positive people
- People With AIDS (PWA)
- Serostatus
