= Galleria Shopping Mall =

- Location: Amanzimtoti, KwaZulu-Natal, South Africa
- Coordinates: 30.0333°S 30.8981°E
- Address: 2 Arbour Road
- Opened: 2008
- Owner: Resilient Property Income Fund (Pty) Limited and Fortress Property Income Fund (Pty) Limited
- Num. of stores: ±170 outlets
- Floor area: 87,000 m^{2} (940,000 sq ft)
- Floors: 4 (shopping levels)
- Parking: 5700 Bays
- Website: galleria.co.za

Galleria Mall is a regional shopping centre located in Amanzimtoti, KwaZulu-Natal and serves Amanzimtoti and nearby towns within the Sapphire Coast region (Amanzimtoti- Umkomaas region). As the largest shopping centre on the South Coast of KwaZulu-Natal, the mall hosts retail giants as well as exclusive boutiques, entertainment, fashion, dining and more.

== Construction ==
Built by Basil Read and Murray & Roberts in 2008-2009.

== Major chainstores ==
- Pick n Pay Stores
- Checkers
- Game
- Woolworths South Africa
- Truworths
- Jet Stores
- Edgars
- American Swiss
- @home
- Ackermans
