= Ilanda Wilds =

Nature reserve in South Africa

Ilanda Wilds Nature Reserve
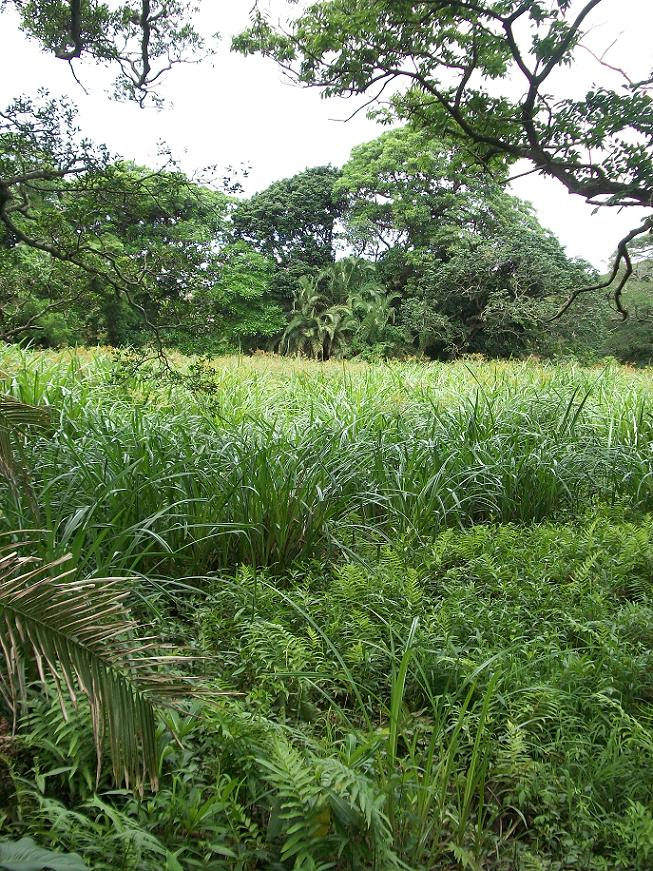
- Marshland and riparian forest in the reserve
- Interactive map of Ilanda Wilds Nature Reserve
- Location: eManzimtoti, South Africa
- Coordinates: 30°03′05″S 30°52′02″E
- Area: 20 ha (49 acres)
- Established: 1965, February 1969
- Governing body: eThekwini Metropolitan Municipality

Ilanda Wilds is a nature reserve along the aManzimtoti River in the town of eManzimtoti, KwaZulu-Natal, South Africa. This small area of land 20 ha (49 acres)) contains various habitat types, ranging from steep rocky slopes to various riverine habitats, forest and small patches of grassland.

== History ==
A portion of Ilanda Wilds was a quarry site. Once abandoned, it was decided by the former Wildlife Society of South Africa (now WESSA) to be rehabilitated as a nature reserve to protect the wide diversity of plants in the area and was proclaimed in 1965 after interaction between local residents (including Charles and Ann Swart), the Wildlife Society and the Local Council of Amanzimtoti. According to Colleen Gill:

"concern about the rapid reduction of indigenous vegetation in 1965 resulted in the formation of the Flora and Fauna preservation committee. This subsequently affiliated with the Wild Life Protection and Conservation Society (now known as Wildlife and Environment Society of SA)."

With the help of "a handful of enthusiasts" and the assistance of T. C. Robertson, the local council agreed to preserve the area of Ilanda Wilds. In March 1972, Stan Craven, then chairman of the local Wildlife Society, arranged the formation of a steering committee for the proposed development of Ilanda Wilds. Volunteers supervised local workers to remove invasive species, made trails and labelled indigenous trees. In 1977 "control of Ilanda Wilds moved from the Wildlife Society back to council". In the early 1990s a memorial was built to King Shaka's naming of Amanzimtoti; he led his army down the south coast on a raid against the Pondos in 1828 and rested on the banks of a river and drank the water, then exclaimed "Kanti amanzi mtoti" (isiZulu: "So, the water is sweet"). It was decided by local council members to place the memorial in Ilanda Wilds, as this was a convenient place next to the river, even though no one knows the actual site where King Shaka rested and drank the water. During the late 1980s and early 1990s Ilanda Wilds reached its peak of development with well maintained paths, bridges and ablution facilities. However the increasing crime situation in South Africa during the 1990s did not leave Ilanda Wilds untouched, and theft from motor vehicles that were left unattended at Ilanda Wilds became commonplace. The ablution facilities were also continuously vandalized and it was decided to demolish them. According to Keith Walters who was in charge of maintaining Ilanda Wilds:

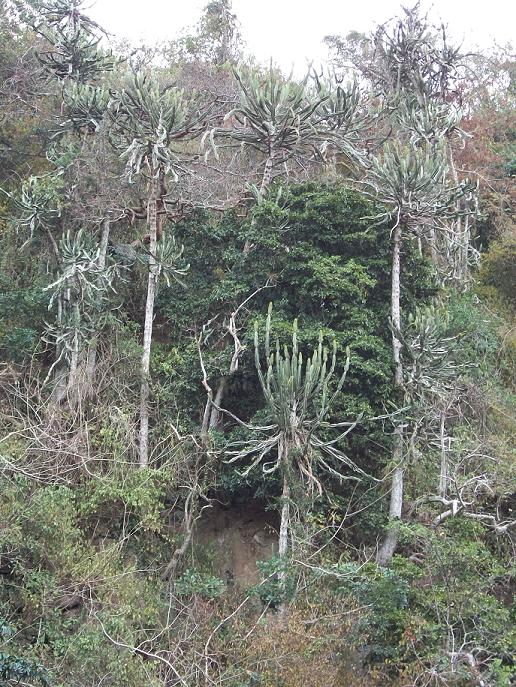
Euphorbias on the cliffs

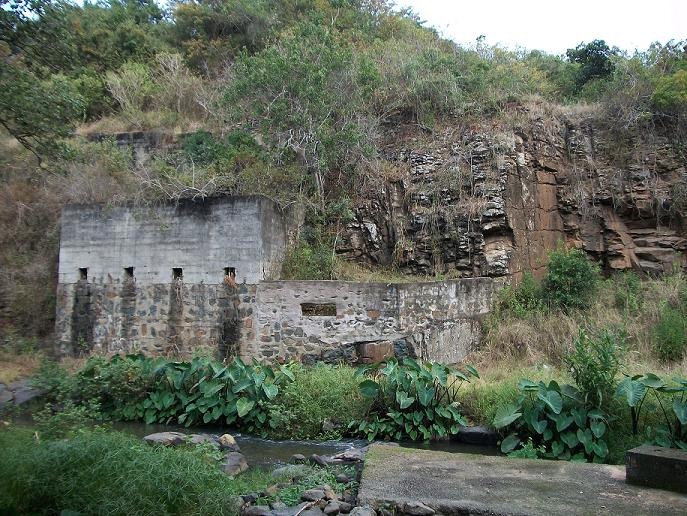
A section of the abandoned quarry site

"I soon realised that society had changed and respectable people no longer wanted to wander and enjoy the reserve [due to] the real threat of criminal elements. Any money that was spent on repairing infrastructure e.g. bridges, fences, ablutions or signage was wasted as these were stolen, or vandalised."

And:

"I also instructed the tourism office not to recommend the area in any brochures due to negative publicity we got from vehicle break-ins, debaucherous behaviour of members of the public, incidents of theft and the poor condition of the reserve infrastructure."

In 2009 a committee was set up by members of the local community under the guidance of Jomo Sibisi. It was intended to upgrade Ilanda Wilds for environmental education of local school children, and to provide guided walks to foreign visitors to the 2010 World Cup. Mr. Sibisi encouraged the municipality to deploy a field ranger to Ilanda Wilds. A field ranger by the name of Musa Mfeka was deployed to Ilanda Wilds in 2009 to prevent grazing of cattle, harvesting of medicinal plants, dumping of rubbish and garden refuse, and to protect the local wildlife. Mr. Sibisi also intended to have a Zulu Village built on the floodplain around the memorial to King Shaka's naming of the Amanzimtoti River where traditional Zulu items could be sold to tourists. The building of the village was intended to "show how the area was in the old days", however it was advised that the building of the village would not pass an environmental impact assessment (if one were to be conducted), and that there had never been a Zulu Village at the site when King Shaka passed through the area. Mr. Sibisi also allegedly supervised the cutting of an unidentified tree below the cliffs in Ilanda Wilds where a wooden stage was to be built for traditional dancing and church choirs to perform in the centre of Ilanda Wilds. The old parking area was enlarged with soil and rubble, and some indigenous trees were partially covered over, to facilitate a parking area big enough for school buses to turn around in, and a local company donated a park home to be used as a museum and environmental education facility. No environmental impact assessments were done concerning these developments. The park home was subsequently vandalized, and local sangomas or inyangas defaced it with muti out of revenge for being chastised for debarking local trees for medicinal use. Other intentions of some members of the committee were to develop a motorbike track in the reserve, a concrete boating slip-way, and a restaurant on top of the cliffs. Some alien plant control was allegedly encouraged by Mr. Sibisi, but in the process some indigenous vegetation in the form of large Dalbergia obovata specimens were mistaken for invasive Pereskia aculeata and cut and poisoned, resulting in rapid growth of the real Pereskia. The committee collapsed in late 2009 due to a lack of support from the community and a lack of support and feedback from the municipality. The field ranger was redeployed in mid-2010 to Silverglen Nature Reserve. A herd of 29 cattle were subsequently free to overgraze the floodplain areas, despite appeals to the metro police, the municipality and the cow herder. Sangomas and inyangas freely use the area to collect muti and to conduct ceremonies involving placing muti in the river, vomiting in the river, and slaughtering chickens and goats in the reserve and spreading the remains, where they are left to rot. One inyanga claimed:

"Now that this man (Jomo Sibisi) who bought the place has run away - the municipality says we are free to do what we want here."

It has since emerged that Ilanda Wilds is not an official Nature Reserve and is (in 2010) not on the list of nature reserves to be proclaimed by Ethekwini Municipality. The area is instead zoned in part as "Coastal Bush" and in part as "Public Open Space" by the municipality:

"To my knowledge this reserve was never proclaimed in terms of the Protected Areas Act, but is rather just a municipal reserve."

During 2010, a local group entitled Friends of Amanzimtoti Green Areas has been keeping an eye on Ilanda Wilds to report on problems and to encourage the municipality to take better care of the area due to its rich biodiversity, with the intention of having Ilanda Wilds proclaimed an official nature reserve, and to have it as the center of a conservancy. According to Sibusiso Mkhwanazi (Manager of Natural Resources at Ethekwini):

"We will have a meeting early January 2011 to discuss management issues for Ilanda Nature Reserve."

== Etymology ==
The name Ilanda Wilds stems from the isiZulu word for cattle egret (iLanda) and English 'Wilds' meaning "wild area". It has been proposed that the correct spelling should be eLanda Wilds meaning "Place of the Cattle Egret; wild area". The cattle egret was chosen as a symbol as these birds used to roost in large numbers in the reeds and trees along the banks of the river.

== Conservation Significance ==
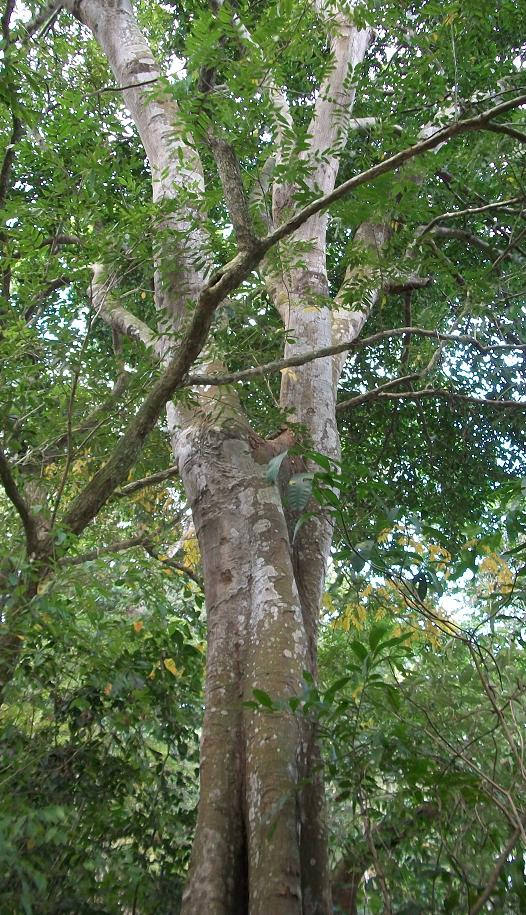
The large Celtis mildbraedii at Ilanda Wilds

Ilanda Wilds was declared "An Area of Conservation Significance" by KZN Wildlife in the 1990s, and a certificate was issued in this respect. The area has a high biodiversity and many habitat types for such a small area.

Ilanda Wilds is the site of the southernmost natural specimen of the Natal white stinkwood (Celtis mildbraedii). This species of tree is uncommon and at one time was classified as the rarest tree species in South Africa. The tree at Ilanda Wilds miraculously survived the mining operations and was already a large specimen when the reserve was proclaimed, and may be over 100 years old. Ilanda Wilds contains around 120 species of trees and shrubs, including two large Fluted Milkwoods.

The reserve is also an important wintering site for the endangered spotted ground-thrush (Zoothera guttata), and provides habitat for the blackheaded dwarf chameleon (Bradypodion melanocephalum), which is endemic to KwaZulu-Natal. Cape clawless otters are also resident in Ilanda Wilds.

== Wildlife ==
Species of Amanzimtoti River and Ilanda Wilds:

=== Vertebrates ===
==== Mammals ====
Blue duiker (Cephalophus monticola bicolor), bushpig (Potamochoerus larvatus koiropotumus), Cape clawless otter (Aonyx capensis capensis), large-spotted genet (Genetta tigrina), banded mongoose (Mungos mungo taenianotus), water mongoose (Atilax paludinosus paludinosis), large grey mongoose (Herpestes icheumon), porcupine (Hystrix africaeaustralis), greater cane rat (Thryonomys swinderianus), vervet monkey (Cercopithecus aethiops pygerythrus). There are also several smaller mammal species such as bats, rodents and shrews.

==== Birds ====
A small selection of the species recorded: Reed cormorant (Microcarbo africanus), white-breasted cormorant (Phalacrocorax carbo), green-backed heron (Butorides striatus), black egret (Egretta ardesiaca), purple heron (Ardea purpurea), black-headed heron (Ardea melanocephala), wooly-necked stork (Ciconia episcopus), hamerkop (Scopus umbretta), African spoonbill (Platalea alba), Egyptian goose (Alopochen aegyptiacus), African black duck (Anas sparsa), yellow-billed duck (Anas undulata), black crake (Amaurornis flavirostris), African jacana (Actophilornis africanus), long-crested eagle (Lophaetus occipitalis), African fish eagle (Haliaeetus vocifer), African goshawk (Accipiter tachiro), osprey (Pandion haliaetus), African harrier-hawk (Polyboroides typus), tambourine dove (Turtur tympanistria), emerald-spotted dove (Turtur chalcospilos), Narina trogon (Apaloderma narina), purple-crested turaco (Tauraco porphyreolophus), Burchell's coucal (Centropus superciliosus), spotted eagle owl (Bubo africanus), giant kingfisher (Megaceryle maxima), pied kingfisher (Ceryle rudis), brown-hooded kingfisher (Halcyon albiventris), pygmy kingfisher (Ispidina picta), half-collared kingfisher (Alcedo semitorquata), malachite kingfisher (Alcedo cristata), red-billed woodhoopoe (Phoeniculus purpureus), crowned hornbill (Tockus alboterminatus), trumpeter hornbill (Bycanistes bucinator), black-headed oriole (Oriolus larvatus), spotted ground-thrush (Zoothera guttata), starred robin (Pogonocichla stellata), chorister robin (Cossypha dichroa), plum-coloured starling (Cinnyricinclus leucogaster), forest weaver (Ploceus bicolor), thick-billed weaver (Amblyospiza albifrons).

==== Reptiles ====
Eastern green mamba (Dendroaspis angusticeps), spotted bush snake (Philothamnus semivariegatus), Sundevall's garter snake (Elapsoidea sundevallii sundevallii), brown water snake (Lycodonomorphus rufulus), Nile monitor (Varanus niloticus niloticus), flap-neck chameleon (Chamaeleo dilepis), KwaZulu dwarf chameleon (Bradypodion melanocephalum).

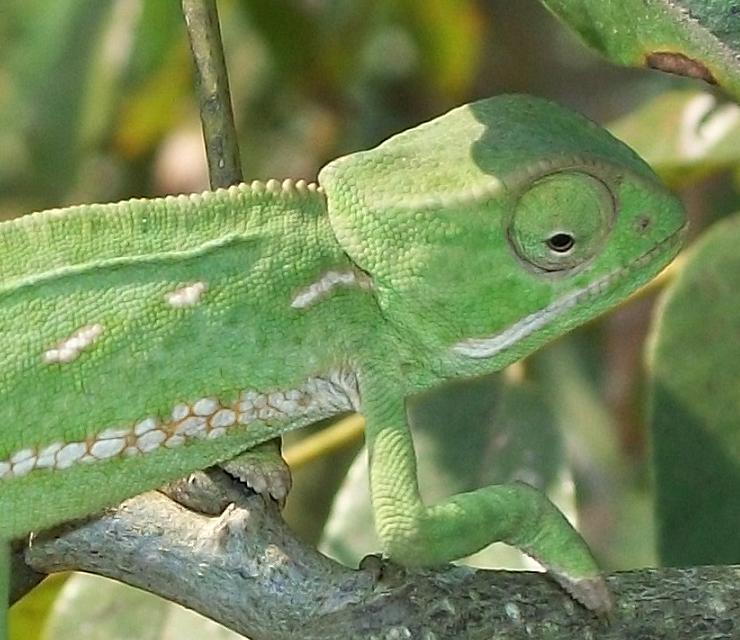
Chamaeleo dilepis at Ilanda Wilds

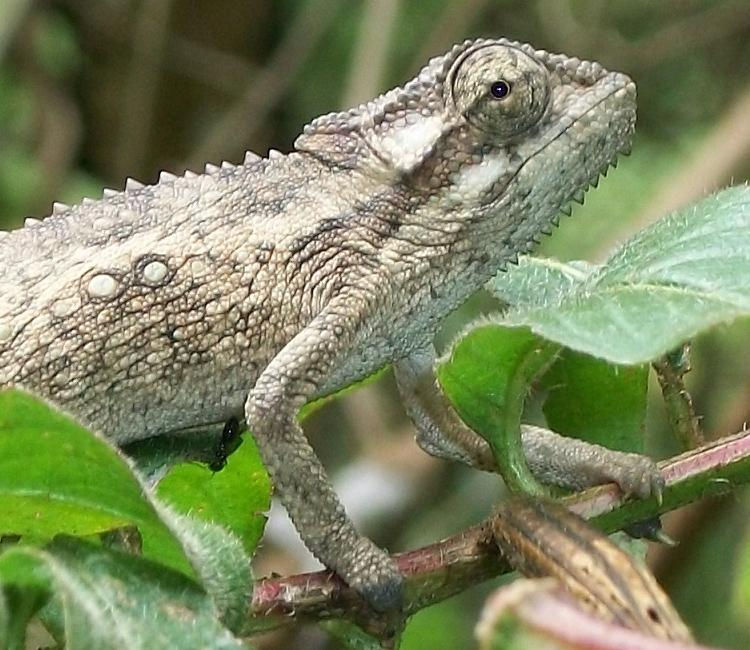
Bradypodion melanocephalum at Ilanda Wilds

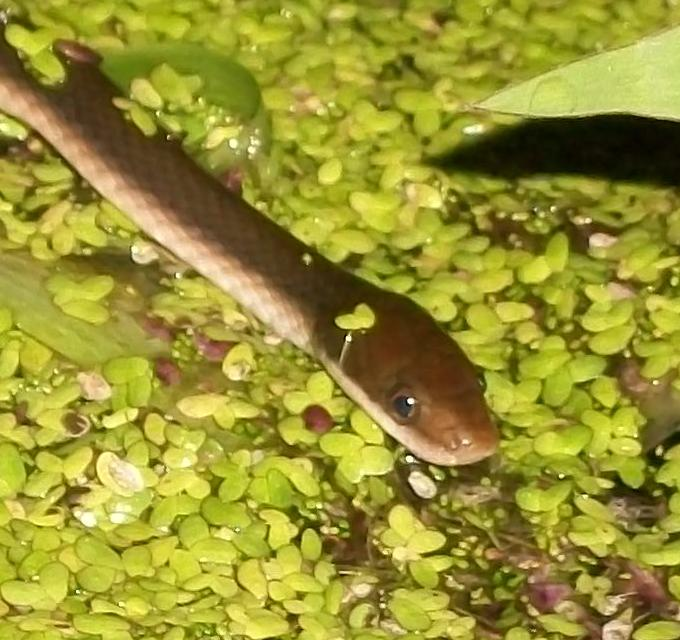
Lycodonomorphus rufulus at Ilanda Wilds

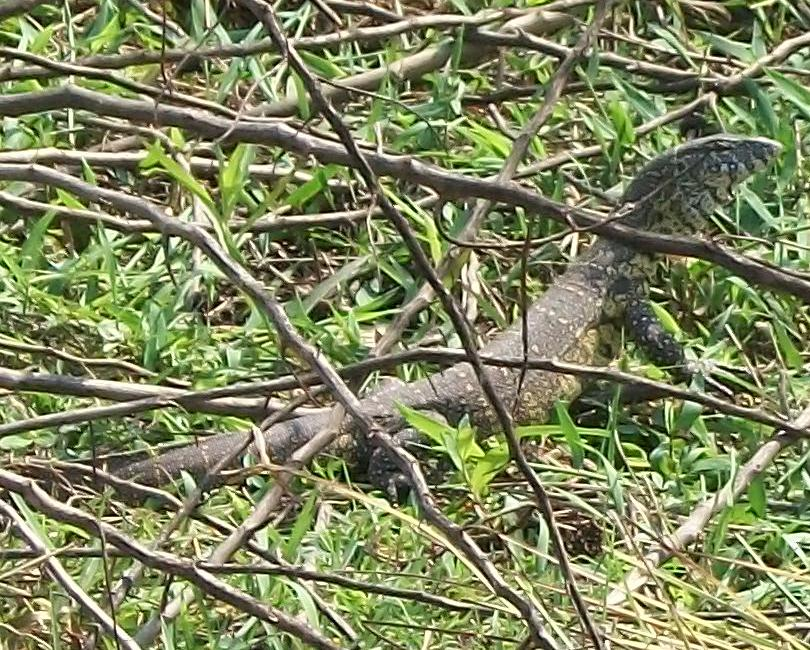
Varanus niloticus at Ilanda Wilds

==== Frogs ====
Bush squeaker (Arthroleptis wahlbergi), guttural toad (Bufo gutturalis), raucous toad (Bufo rangeri), greater leaf-folding frog (Afrixalus fornasini), painted reed frog (Hyperolius marmoratus), waterlilly reed frog (Hyperolius pusillus), argus reed frog (Hyperolius argus), forest tree frog (Leptopelis natalensis), common platanna (Xenopus laevis), common river frog (Afrana angolensis), sharp-nosed grass frog (Ptychadena oxyrhynchus), striped stream frog (Strongylopus fasciatus), snoring puddle frog (Phrynobatrachus natalensis).

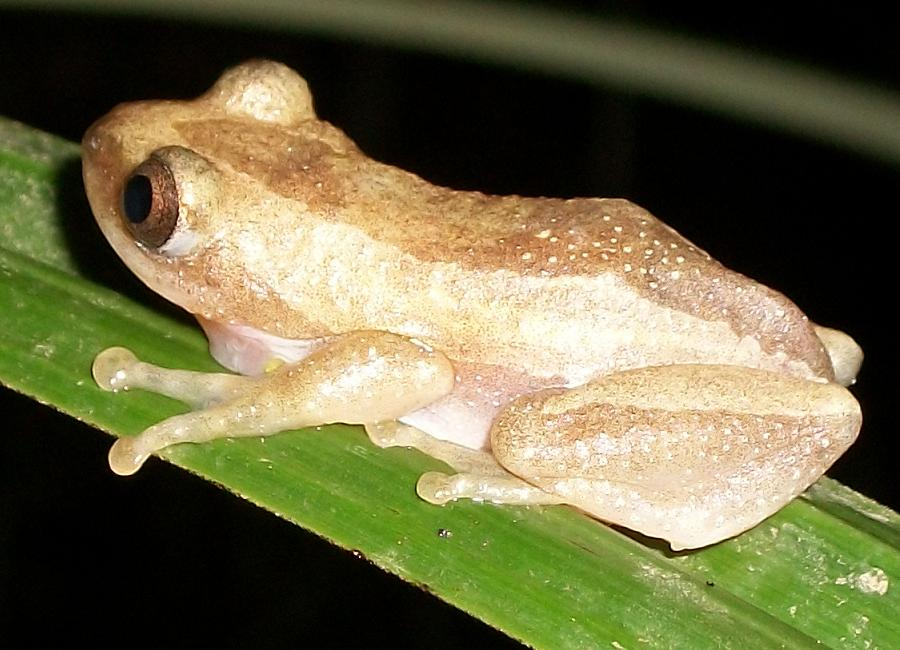
Afrixalus fornasini at Ilanda Wilds

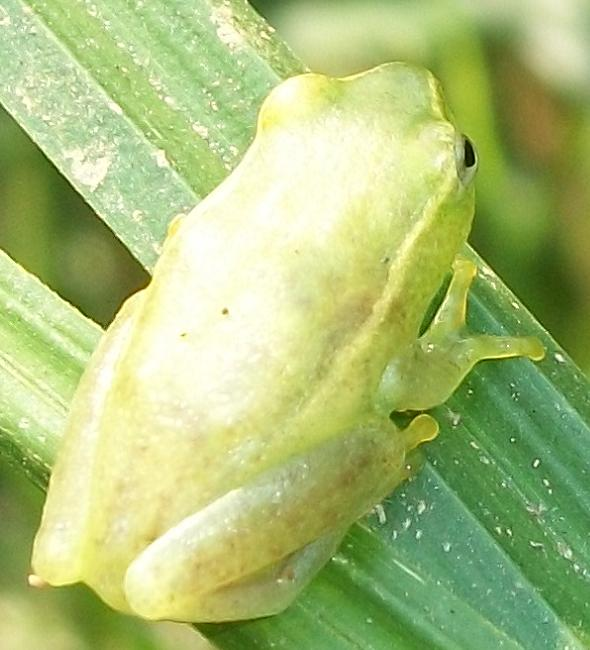
Hyperolius pusillus at Ilanda Wilds

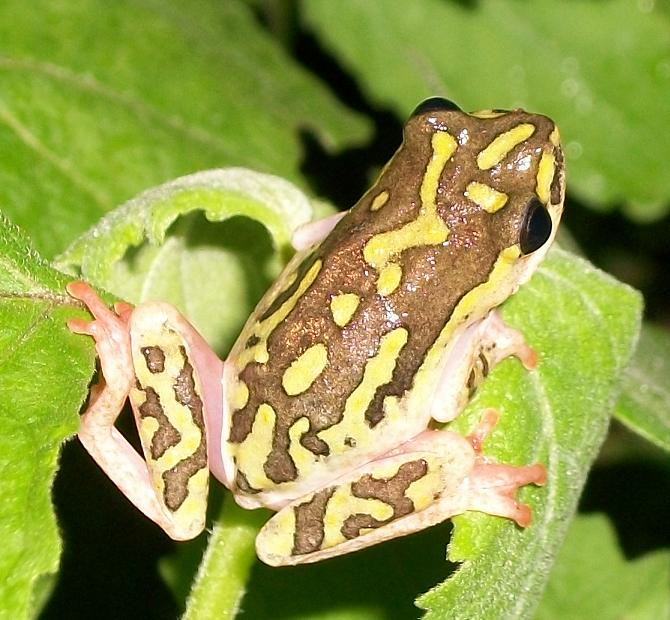
Hyperolius marmoratus at Ilanda Wilds

==== Fish ====
Burrowing goby (Croilia mossambica), river goby (Glossogobius callidus), freshwater goby (Awaous aeneofuscus), golden sleeper (Hypseleotris dayi), broadhead sleeper (Eleotris melanosoma), dusky sleeper (Eleotris fusca), Cape moony (Monodactylus falciformis), Natal moony (Monodactylus argenteus), large-scale mullet (Liza macrolepis), freshwater mullet (Myxus capensis), estuarine round-herring (Gilchristella aestuaria), glassy (Ambassis sp.), Mozambique tilapia (Oreochromis mossambicus), banded tilapia (Tilapia sparrmanii), southern mouthbrooder (Pseudocrenilabrus philander), sharptooth catfish (Clarias gariepinus), bowstripe barb (Enteromius viviparus), longfin eel (Anguilla mossambica).

=== Invertebrates ===
==== Butterflies ====
A butterfly census is underway at Ilanda Wilds (2010). Some of the species recorded so far can be seen in the pictures below:

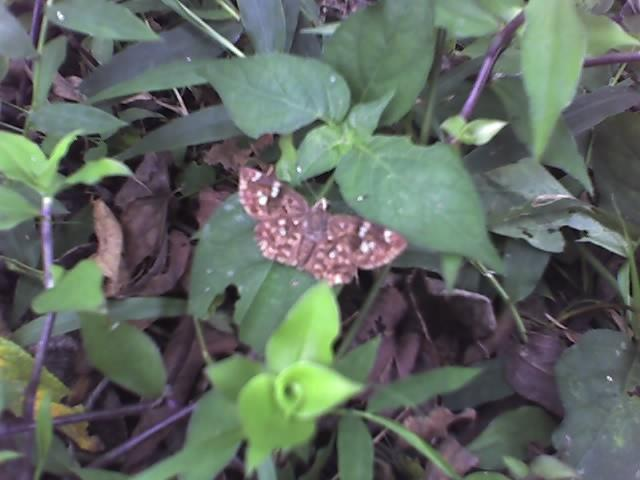
Sarangesa motozi

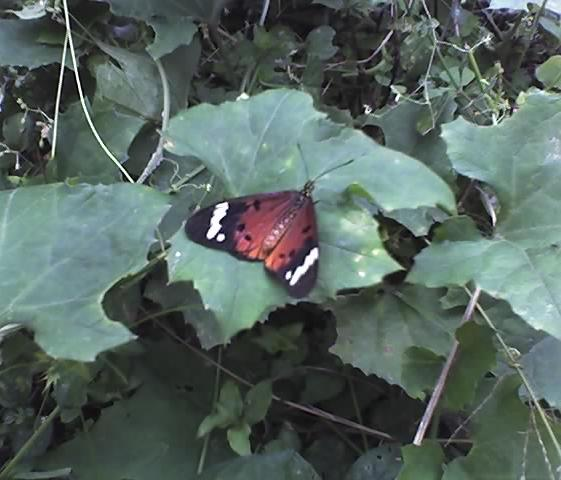
Telchinia encedon

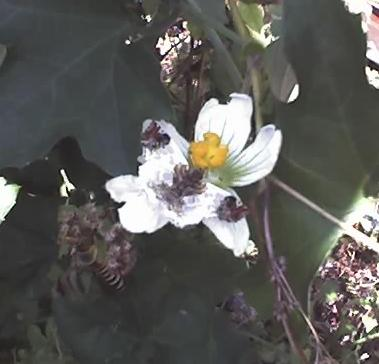
Netrobalane canopus

==== Crustaceans ====
The Natal river crab, swimming crabs and shrimps are found in Ilanda Wilds.
