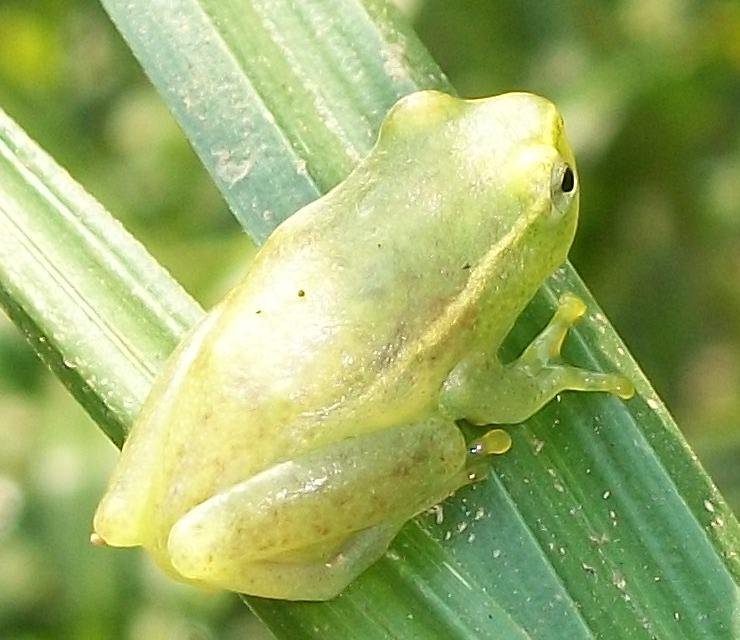
- Waterlily reed frog from Ilanda Wilds, South Africa

Conservation status
- Least Concern (IUCN 3.1)

Scientific classification
- Kingdom: Animalia
- Phylum: Chordata
- Class: Amphibia
- Order: Anura
- Family: Hyperoliidae
- Genus: Hyperolius
- Species: H. pusillus

Binomial name
- Hyperolius pusillus (Cope, 1862)

Synonyms
- Hyperolius microps Günther, 1864; Hyperolius heuglini Steindachner, 1864; Hyperolius usaramoae Loveridge, 1932; Hyperolius translucens Power, 1935; Hyperolius milnei Loveridge, 1935

= Hyperolius pusillus =

Species of amphibian

Hyperolius pusillus (common names: waterlily reed frog and various variants thereof, dwarf reed frog) is a species of frog in the family Hyperoliidae. It is found throughout diverse environments in eastern and southern Africa. It is a very common frog. Its natural habitats are open savanna, bush land and grassland. Breeding takes place in shallow pans, vleis, open swamps, and dams with floating vegetation such as water lilies.

Hyperolius pusillus can resemble members of the larger Hyperolius argus species, which is also native to eastern and southern Africa.

== Distribution and populations ==
Hyperolius pusillus is found in both eastern and southern Africa. Key populations are found in southern Kenya, Malawi, and Zimbabwe. There are also populations in northern Malawi and Botswana. The species may also extend into the far west of Kenya and portions of Uganda.

Hyperolius pusillus is also found in Eswatini, Mozambique, Somalia, South Africa, and Tanzania. Different populations display different coloration.

== Coloration ==
The different populations vary in color. They are generally green, with darker specks covering their bodies, and different populations display patterns such as an hourglass shape (found in Kenya). Sexual dimorphism is found in the color of the throat, which is in males white and in females green. Eyes of both the male and female are gold in color.

== Reproduction ==
Hyperolius pusillus males call from floating vegetation which is in contrast to Hyperolius viridis which calls from wet grassland. The female lays batches of between 20 and 120 eggs at a time amongst floating plants. Eggs of H. pusillus are light green. Tadpoles are initially green, but become green-brown with black tails as they age.

== Status ==
Hyperolius pusillus has a wide range and is a common and sometimes abundant species. The population trend is unknown but this frog faces no particular threats and seems an adaptable species, so the International Union for Conservation of Nature has rated it as being of "least concern".

== Gallery ==
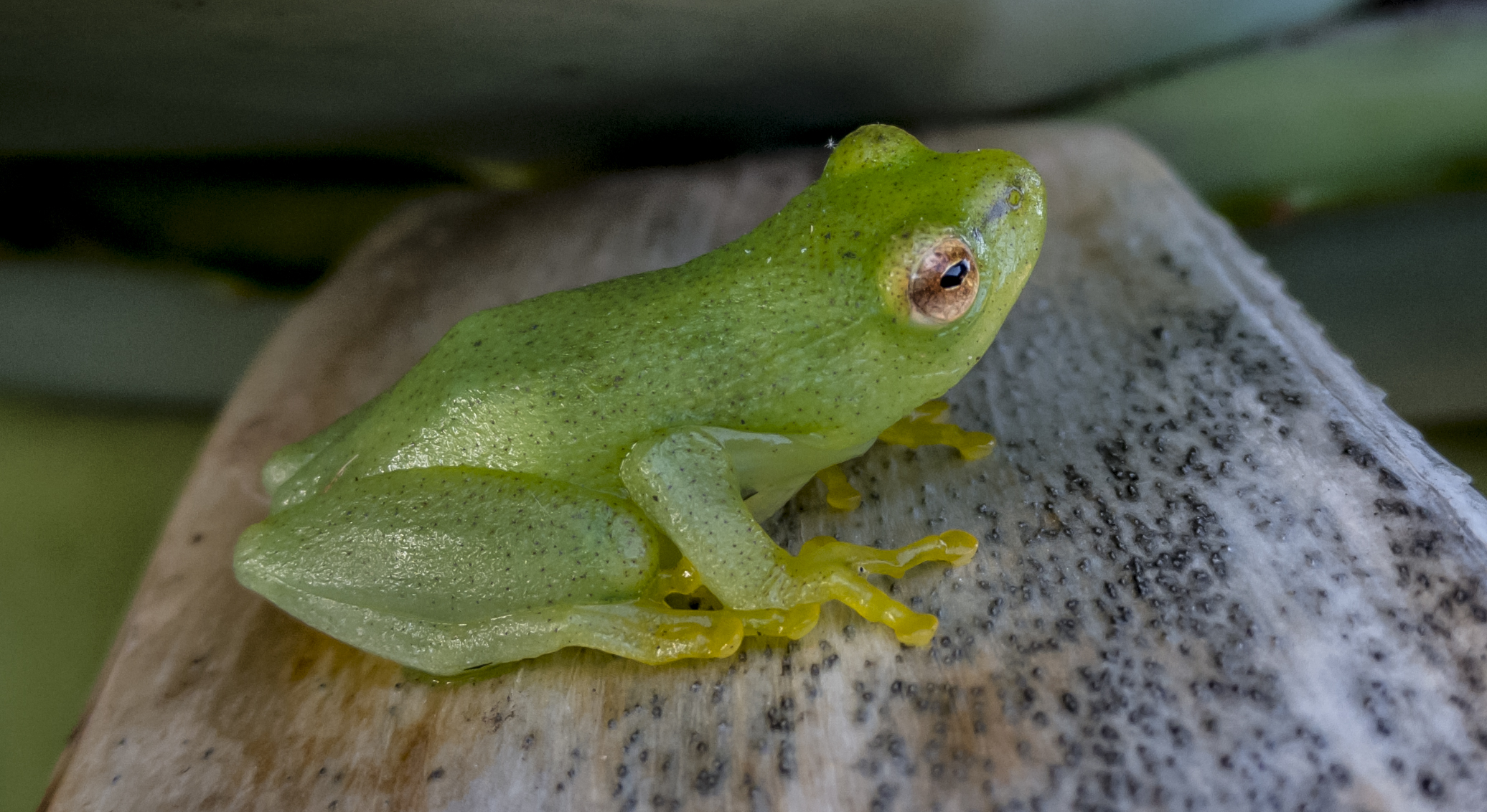

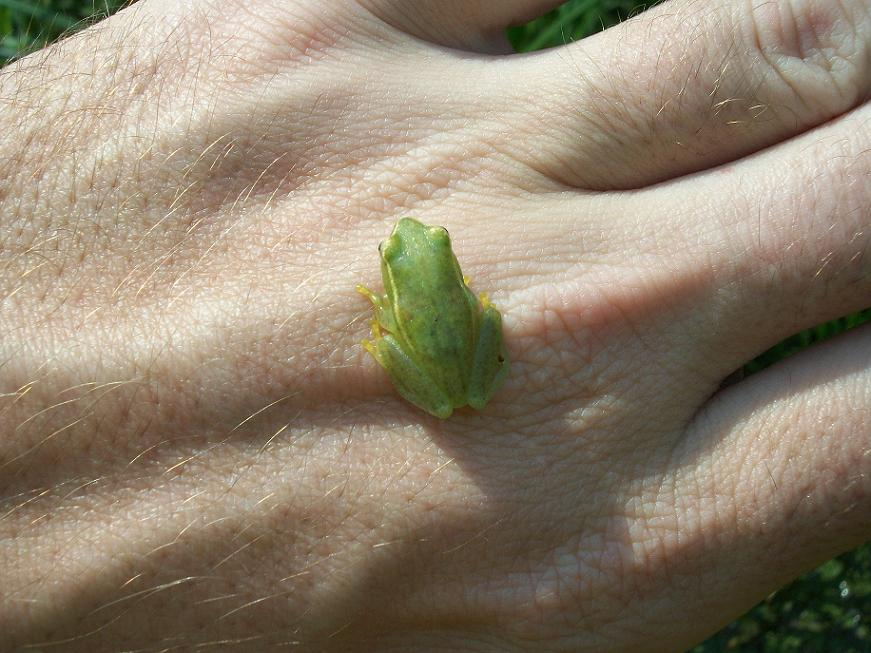
Adult frog on human hand

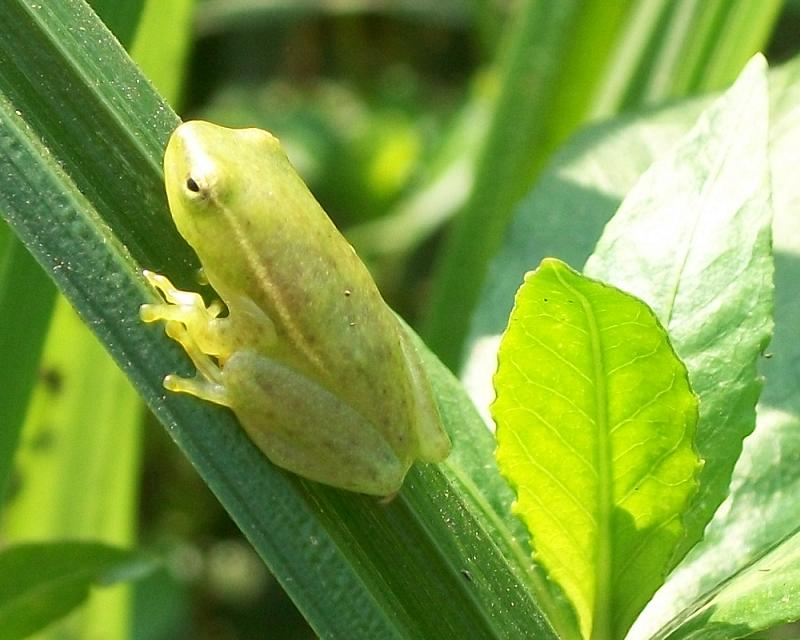
Amongst vegetation

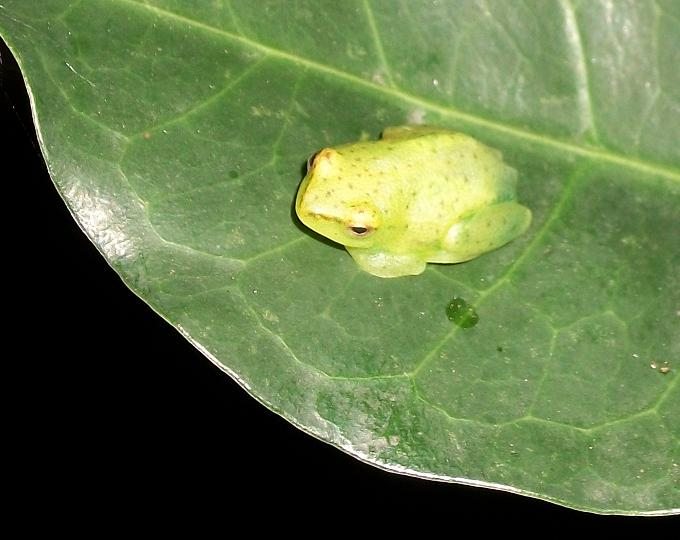
On a tree leaf
