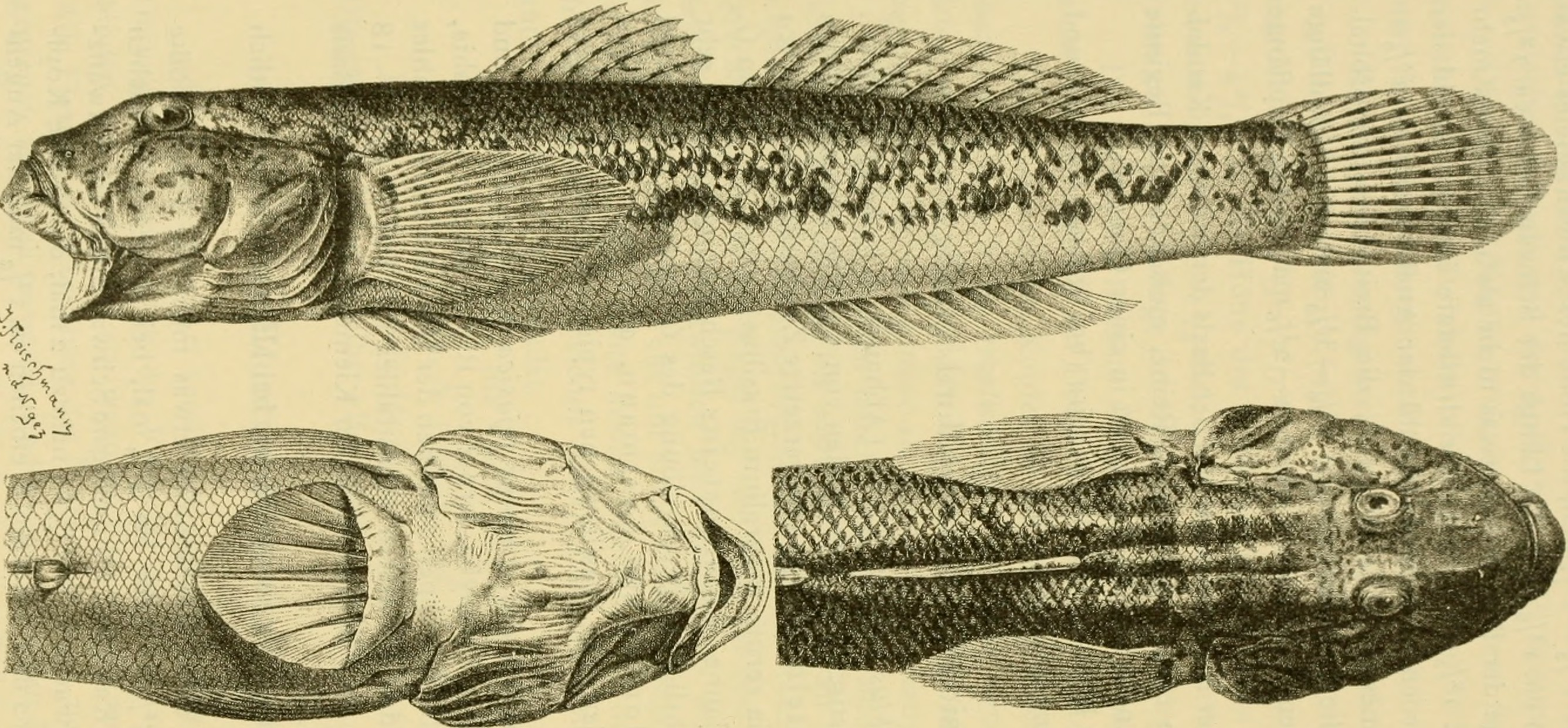

Conservation status
- Least Concern (IUCN 3.1)

Scientific classification
- Kingdom: Animalia
- Phylum: Chordata
- Class: Actinopterygii
- Order: Gobiiformes
- Family: Oxudercidae
- Genus: Awaous
- Species: A. tajasica

Binomial name
- Awaous tajasica (M. H. C. Lichtenstein, 1822)

Synonyms
- Gobius tajasica M. H. C. Lichtenstein, 1822; Euctenogobius latus O'Shaughnessy, 1875; Suiboga travassosi S. Y. Pinto, 1960

= Awaous tajasica =

Species of fish

Awaous tajasica, the sand fish or sandfish, is a species of goby native to fresh and brackish waters of Brazil in South America with reports outside of Brazil considered to be questionable. This species can reach a length of 16.3 cm (6.4 in) SL.
