= Awaous pallidus =

Scientific classification
- Domain: Eukaryota
- Kingdom: Animalia
- Phylum: Chordata
- Class: Actinopterygii
- Order: Gobiiformes
- Family: Oxudercidae
- Genus: Awaous
- Species: A. pallidus

Binomial name
- Awaous pallidus (Valenciennes, 1837)

Synonyms
- Gobius pallidus Valenciennes, 1837; Awavus pallidus (Valenciennes, 1837); Chonophorus pallidus (Valenciennes, 1837)

Species of fish

Awaous pallidus is a species of goby found in Mauritius.

== Size ==
This species reaches a length of 19.0 cm (7.5 in).
