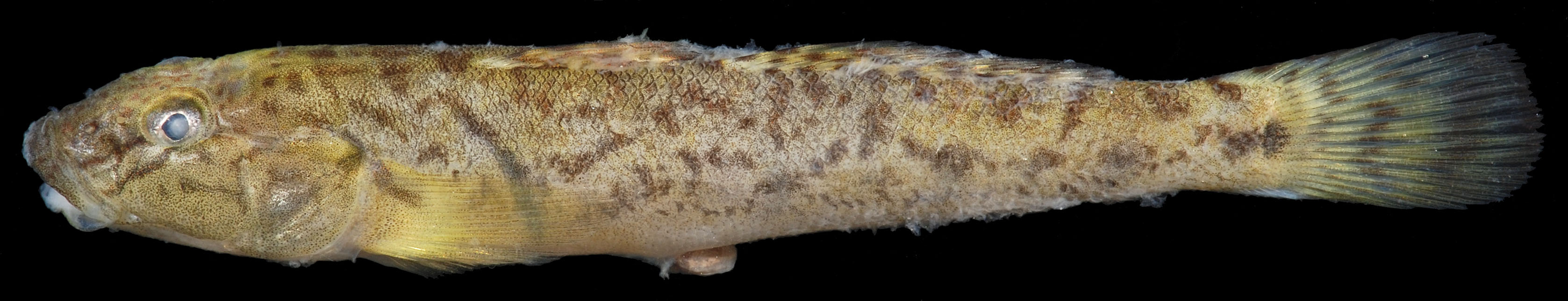

Conservation status
- Least Concern (IUCN 3.1)

Scientific classification
- Kingdom: Animalia
- Phylum: Chordata
- Class: Actinopterygii
- Order: Gobiiformes
- Family: Oxudercidae
- Genus: Awaous
- Species: A. banana

Binomial name
- Awaous banana (Valenciennes, 1837)

Synonyms
- List: Gobius banana Valenciennes, 1837; Gobius martinicus Valenciennes, 1837; Chonophorus bucculentus Poey, 1860; Chonophorus contractus Poey, 1860; Gobius mexicanus Günther, 1861; Gobius dolichocephalus Cope, 1867; Awaous nelsoni Evermann, 1898; Gobius guentheri Regan, 1903

= Awaous banana =

Species of fish

Awaous banana, the river goby, is a species of goby native to fresh and brackish water stream and rivers from the southern United States through Central America to Venezuela and Peru. This species can reach a length of 30 centimetres (12 in) SL. It is important to local commercial fisheries.
