= Awaous bustamantei =

Conservation status
- Vulnerable (IUCN 3.1)

Scientific classification
- Kingdom: Animalia
- Phylum: Chordata
- Class: Actinopterygii
- Order: Gobiiformes
- Family: Oxudercidae
- Genus: Awaous
- Species: A. bustamantei

Binomial name
- Awaous bustamantei (Greeff, 1882)

Synonyms
- Gobius bustamantei Greeff, 1882; Sicydium bustamantei (Greeff, 1882); Gobius bustamentéi Greeff, 1882

Species of fish

Awaous bustamantei is a species of goby found in Africa.

== Size ==
This species reaches a length of 19.3 cm (7.6 in).

== Etymology ==
The fish is named in honor of Brazilian slave trader Gabriel de Bustamenté, who collected the type specimen, and the owner of the farm situated on São Tomé Island, Gulf of Guinea, the type locality.
