= Thomas Chalmers Robertson =

- Born: 15 September 1907; Middelburg, South Africa
- Died: 11 January 1989 (aged 81); Durban, South Africa
- Education: University of the Witwatersrand
- Occupations: Writer, journalist, ecologist, conservationist
- Political party: Labour Party; United Party

Dr. Thomas Chalmers Robertson (15 September 1907 – 11 January 1989) was a South African writer, journalist, ecologist and conservationist. During World War II, he was a war correspondent and wrote anti-Nazi propaganda for the government of Jan Smuts.

== Journalism and politics ==
After completing his law degree in 1926, Robertson began working as a Johannesburg correspondent for Ons Vaderland, the predicesor of Die Vaderland. The following year, he traveled to Northern Rhodesia, where he became an editor of The Livingstone Mail and a correspondent for The Times. He later worked in Ceylon and Australia before returning to South Africa in 1931 to serve as a parliamentary correspondent for the Cape Times. In 1934, he joined the editorial staff of The Rand Daily Mail and the Sunday Times.

In 1937, he became an editor of Forward, a Labour Party newspaper, and even unsuccessfully contested the 1938 election as the Labour candidate for Fordsburg. In 1938, he became a parliamentary correspondent for The Rand Daily Mail and the Sunday Times. During the Second World War, he served as director of the Union Unity Truth Service, a pro-government, pro-war propaganda organization, and as editor of its journal, Libertas. He was also a war correspondent covering the Madagascar and North African campaigns.

At the request of Smuts, he stood in the 1948 election as the United Party candate for Witbank but was not elected.

== Conservation ==
Robertson advocated for soil and grassland conservation in Southern Africa and served as director of the National Veld Trust until his retirement in 1966.

He spent his retirement years in Scottburgh where the T.C. Robertson Nature Reserve is named after him. He also helped establish Ilanda Wilds, a nature reserve in Amanzimtoti north of Scottburgh.

== "White nationalism" as a term ==
According to Dictionary.com, Robertson coined the term "white nationalism" in his 1948 essay Racism Comes to Power in South Africa: The Threat of White Nationalism. However, Merriam-Webster has found earlier usage of the phrase, dating to 1925.
