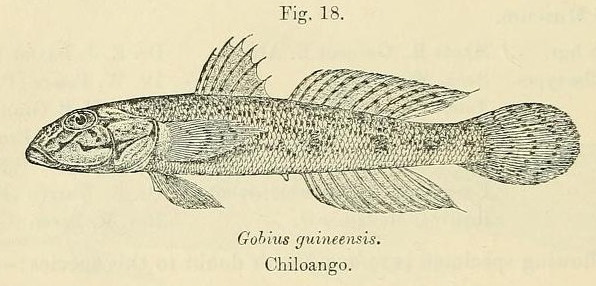

Conservation status
- Least Concern (IUCN 3.1)

Scientific classification
- Kingdom: Animalia
- Phylum: Chordata
- Class: Actinopterygii
- Order: Gobiiformes
- Family: Oxudercidae
- Genus: Awaous
- Species: A. lateristriga

Binomial name
- Awaous lateristriga (A. H. A. Duméril, 1861)

Synonyms
- List: Gobius lateristriga A. H. A. Duméril, 1861; Chonophorus lateristriga (A. H. A. Duméril, 1861); Gobius aeneofuscus guineensis W. K. H. Peters, 1876; Awaous guineensis (W. K. H. Peters, 1876); Chonophorus guineensis (W. K. H. Peters, 1876); Gobius guineensis W. K. H. Peters, 1876

= Awaous lateristriga =

Species of fish

Awaous lateristriga, the West African freshwater goby, is a species of goby found in marine, fresh and brackish waters (though mostly in freshwaters) along the Atlantic coast of Africa from Senegal to the Cunene River, Angola and also from islands in the Gulf of Guinea. This species can reach a length of 26.4 centimetres (10.4 in) TL.
