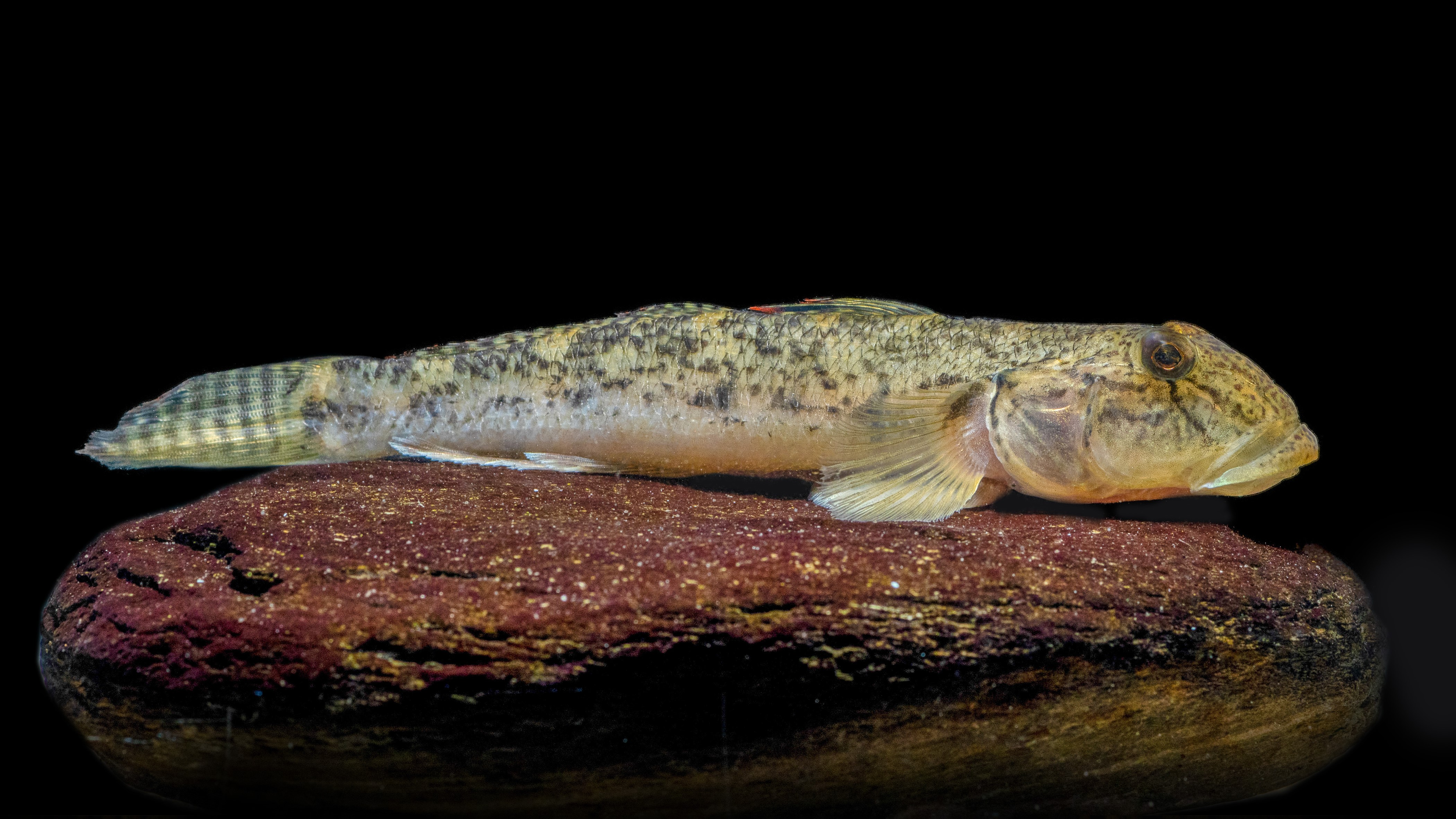

Conservation status
- Least Concern (IUCN 3.1)

Scientific classification
- Kingdom: Animalia
- Phylum: Chordata
- Class: Actinopterygii
- Order: Gobiiformes
- Family: Oxudercidae
- Genus: Awaous
- Species: A. ocellaris

Binomial name
- Awaous ocellaris (Broussonet, 1782)

Synonyms
- Gobius ocellaris Broussonet, 1782; Chonophorus ocellaris (Broussonet, 1782); Gobius awaou Lacépède, 1800; Gobius punctatus Solander, 1837

= Awaous ocellaris =

Species of fish

Awaous ocellaris is a species of goby native to fresh, marine and brackish waters of southern Asia from India to the Philippines, and eastern Asia to Japan as well as the islands of Oceania. This species can reach a length of 13 centimetres (5.1 in) TL. It is of minor importance to local commercial fisheries.
