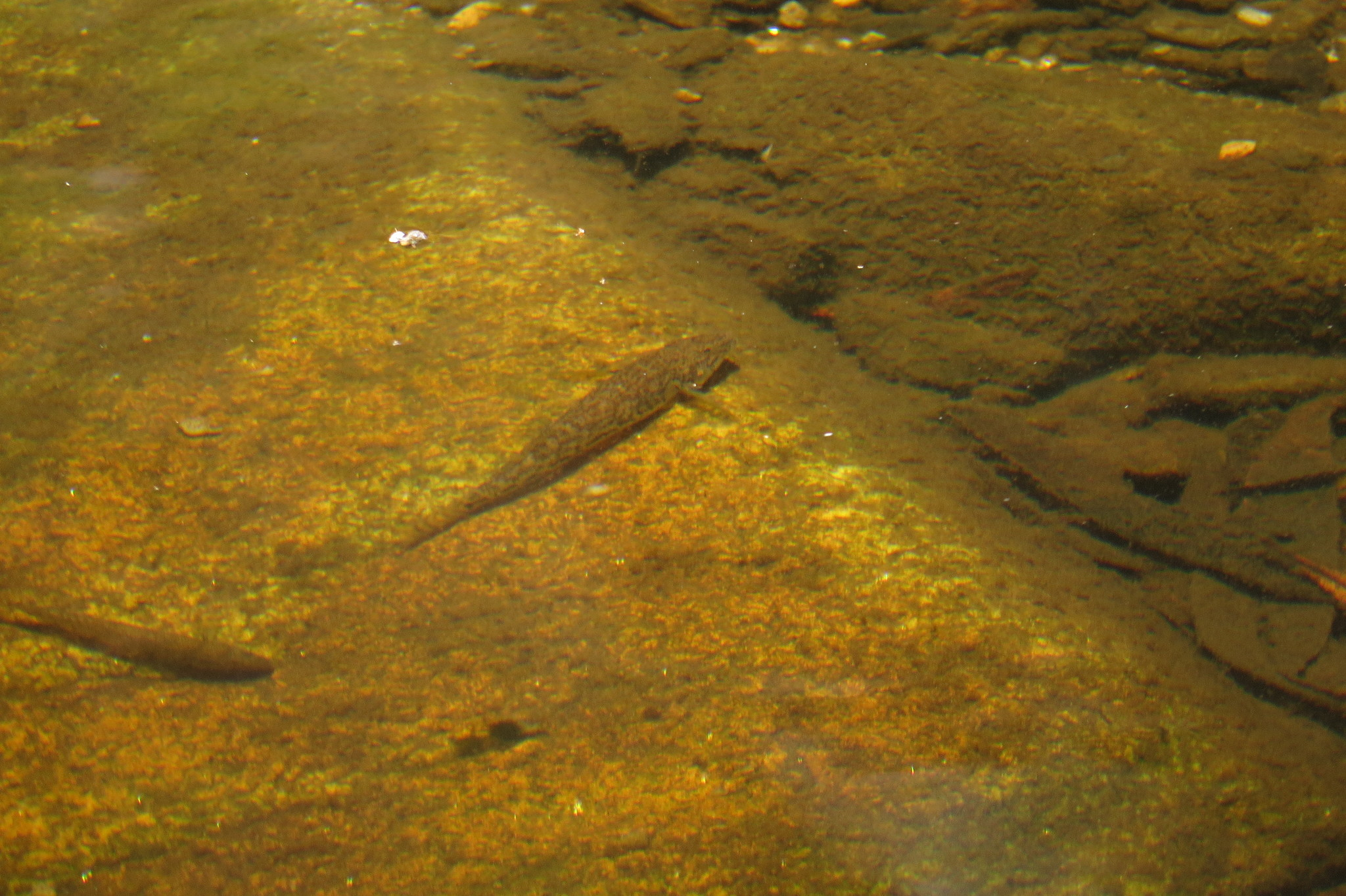

Conservation status
- Least Concern (IUCN 3.1)

Scientific classification
- Kingdom: Animalia
- Phylum: Chordata
- Class: Actinopterygii
- Order: Gobiiformes
- Family: Oxudercidae
- Genus: Awaous
- Species: A. acritosus

Binomial name
- Awaous acritosus Watson, 1994

= Awaous acritosus =

Species of fish

Awaous acritosus, the Roman nose goby, is a species of goby that is native to fresh water rivers and streams of Queensland, Australia and the Laloki River drainage of New Guinea.

Adults inhabit tropical freshwater streams above the tidal influence, while the larvae may be washed downstream to estuaries or the sea. The species is usually found in clear, or occasionally turbid waters, with gravelly, sandy and muddy bottoms near aquatic vegetation.

== Description ==
The Roman nose goby is a large pale brownish goby with irregular dark blotches and lines on the head and body, a series of blackish blotches along the midside, and a fine dark line from the eye to the rear of the upper lip. The species has large lips, and a distinctly sloping snout - hence the common name.

This species can reach a length of 18 centimetres (7.1 in) SL.

The Roman nose goby has been misidentified as Awaous crassilabrus, a species that does not occur in Australia. Indeed, its species name, acritosus is from the Greek akritos, meaning 'confused', in reference to incorrect identity of this species for more than 125 years.

== Diet ==
The Roman nose goby feeds mostly on algae, but also ingests large amounts of sand thereby unintentionally consuming detritus and animal material.
