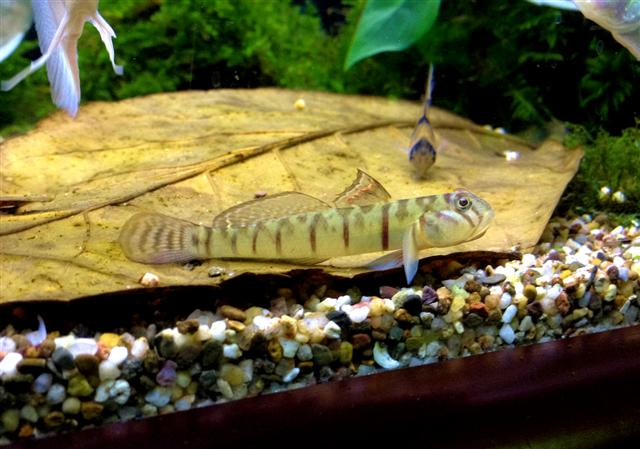

Conservation status
- Least Concern (IUCN 3.1)

Scientific classification
- Kingdom: Animalia
- Phylum: Chordata
- Class: Actinopterygii
- Order: Gobiiformes
- Family: Oxudercidae
- Genus: Awaous
- Species: A. flavus

Binomial name
- Awaous flavus (Valenciennes, 1837)

Synonyms
- List: Gobius flavus Valenciennes, 1837; Euctenogobius badius T. N. Gill, 1859; Euctenogobius strigatus O'Shaughnessy, 1875; Gobius kraussii Steindachner, 1879; Awaous decemlineatus C. H. Eigenmann, 1918

= Awaous flavus =

Species of fish

Awaous flavus is a species of goby native to fresh and brackish waters of rivers and estuaries of South America from Colombia to near the mouth of the Amazon River in Brazil. Males of this species can reach a length of 8.2 centimetres (3.2 in) SL while females only reach 7.6 centimetres (3.0 in) SL.
