= Awaous litturatus =

Conservation status
- Data Deficient (IUCN 3.1)

Scientific classification
- Kingdom: Animalia
- Phylum: Chordata
- Class: Actinopterygii
- Order: Gobiiformes
- Family: Oxudercidae
- Genus: Awaous
- Species: A. litturatus

Binomial name
- Awaous litturatus (Steindachner, 1861)

Synonyms
- Gobius litturatus Steindachner, 1861

Species of fish

Awaous litturatus is a species of goby found in the Philippines.
