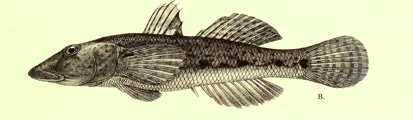

Conservation status
- Least Concern (IUCN 3.1)

Scientific classification
- Kingdom: Animalia
- Phylum: Chordata
- Class: Actinopterygii
- Order: Gobiiformes
- Family: Oxudercidae
- Genus: Awaous
- Species: A. guamensis

Binomial name
- Awaous guamensis (Valenciennes, 1837)

Synonyms
- Gobius guamensis Valenciennes, 1837; Chonophorus guamensis (Valenciennes, 1837); Gobius crassilabris Günther, 1861; Awaous crassilabris (Günther, 1861)

= Awaous guamensis =

Species of fish

Awaous guamensis is a species of goby native to the Pacific islands from the Marianas to Vanuatu, New Caledonia and Fiji where it can be found in fresh, brackish and marine waters. Recent work based upon morphological and genetic differences has recognized Hawaiian populations of Awaous as being distinct from Awaous guamensis. Consequently, Hawaiian Awaous are now recognized as a distinct species Awaous stamineus.

== Description ==
Males can reach a length of 24.5 cm (9.6 in) SL while females only reach 16.5 cm (6.5 in). The body has white streaks with speckles and a dark olive color.

== Ecology ==
The species is found in slow-moving waters during their annual spawning run to the stream mouth. 'O'opu nakea can swim upstream between 10 and 200 feet in strong currents. They are omnivores, and their diet in one study was found to consist of 84% filamentous algae and 16% of chironomids (non-biting midges) and other animal food.

Eggs are laid downstream just above the estuary, where the males guard the nest. The males make the nest and attract the females who then lay one clutch per year.

== Human use ==
'O'opu nakea are eaten cooked; a common way of preparation is by salting them for 12 hours, then wrapping them in ti leaves and placing them on hot coals.
