= Witbank (House of Assembly of South Africa constituency) =

- Former constituency for the South African House of Assembly
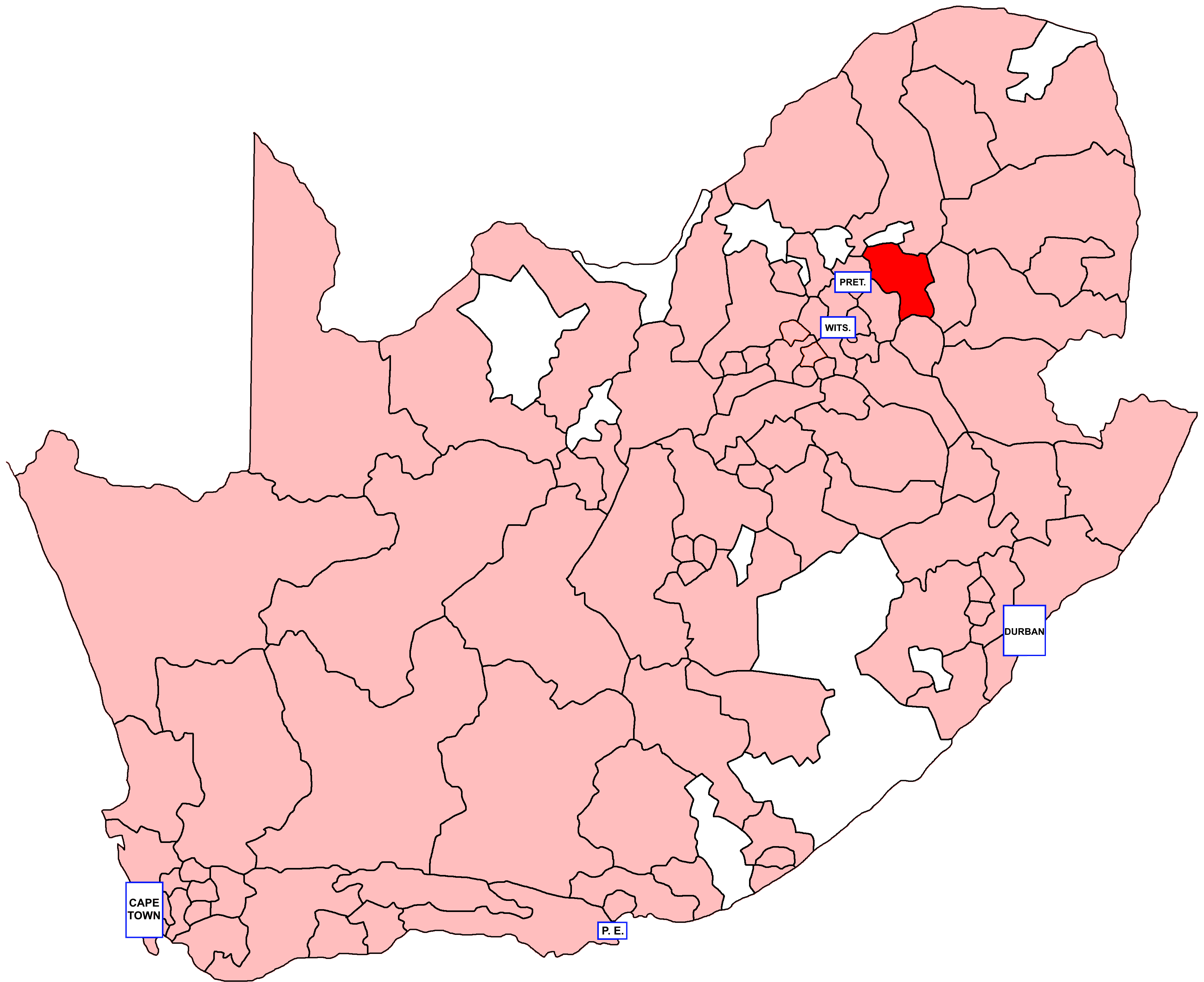
- Location of Witbank within South Africa (1981)
- Province: Transvaal
- Electorate: 26,190 (1989)

Former constituency
- Created: 1920
- Abolished: 1994
- Number of members: 1
- Last MHA: W. J. D. van Wyk (CP)
- Replaced by: Mpumalanga

Witbank was a constituency in the Transvaal Province of South Africa, which existed from 1920 to 1994. Named after the town of Witbank, it covered a rural area in the eastern Transvaal. Throughout its existence it elected one member to the House of Assembly and one to the Transvaal Provincial Council.

== Franchise notes ==
When the Union of South Africa was formed in 1910, the electoral qualifications in use in each pre-existing colony were kept in place. In the Transvaal Colony, and its predecessor the South African Republic, the vote was restricted to white men, and as such, elections in the Transvaal Province were held on a whites-only franchise from the beginning. The franchise was also restricted by property and education qualifications until the 1933 general election, following the passage of the Women's Enfranchisement Act, 1930 and the Franchise Laws Amendment Act, 1931. From then on, the franchise was given to all white citizens aged 21 or over. Non-whites remained disenfranchised until the end of apartheid and the introduction of universal suffrage in 1994.

== History ==
Like most of the rural Transvaal, Witbank was a conservative seat and had a largely Afrikaans-speaking electorate. It was generally a safe seat for the National Party, with two major exceptions: the 1934-48 period, when the United Party was dominant throughout the province until D. J. J. Mostert defeated T. C. Robertson from the United Party, and after 1987, when the Conservative Party took advantage of rural white discontent with P. W. Botha's policy of limited reform to take over a number of rural seats, including Witbank.

== Members ==
Election	Member	Party
1920	A. I. E. de Villiers	National
1921	A. I. E. de Villiers	National
1924	A. I. E. de Villiers	National
1929	G. T. Robertson	National
1933	S. P. Bekker	National
1934 by	J. T. Bezuidenhout	National
1934	J. T. Bezuidenhout	United
1938	J. T. Bezuidenhout	United
1943	H. J. Bekker	United
1948	Dirk J. J. Mostert	HNP
1953	Dirk J. J. Mostert	National
1958	Dirk J. J. Mostert	National
1961	Dirk J. J. Mostert	National
1966	T. N. H. Janson	National
1970	T. N. H. Janson	National
1974	T. N. H. Janson	National
1977	T. N. H. Janson	National
1981	A. F. Fouché	National
1987	W. J. D. van Wyk	Conservative
1989	W. J. D. van Wyk	Conservative
1994	Constituency abolished	

== Detailed results ==
=== Elections in the 1920s ===
General election 1920: Witbank
Party	Candidate	Votes	%	±%
National	A. I. E. de Villiers	970	49.9	New
South African	R. Eadie	726	37.4	New
Labour	G. H. Kretzschmer	246	12.7	New
Majority		244	12.5	N/A
Turnout		1,942	65.2	N/A
National win (new seat)				

General election 1921: Witbank
Party	Candidate	Votes	%	±%
National	A. I. E. de Villiers	1,059	52.6	+2.7
South African	H. du Toit	956	47.4	+10.0
Majority		103	5.2	−7.3
Turnout		2,015	63.1	−2.1
National hold		Swing	-3.7	

General election 1924: Witbank
Party	Candidate	Votes	%	±%
National	A. I. E. de Villiers	1,175	55.4	+2.8
South African	J. F. Ludorf	934	44.0	−3.4
Rejected ballots		14	0.6	N/A
Majority		241	11.4	+6.2
Turnout		2,123	83.8	+20.7
National hold		Swing	+3.1	

General election 1929: Witbank
Party	Candidate	Votes	%	±%
National	G. T. Robertson	1,140	55.3	−0.1
South African	H. J. Bekker	890	43.2	−0.8
Rejected ballots		31	1.5	+0.9
Majority		250	12.1	+0.7
Turnout		2,061	83.3	−0.5
National hold		Swing	+0.4	

=== Elections in the 1930s ===
General election 1933: Witbank
Party	Candidate	Votes	%	±%
National	S. P. Bekker	2,436	61.5	+6.2
Independent	J. C. Miller	764	19.3	New
Independent	J. T. Robertson	743	18.8	New
Rejected ballots		20	0.4	-1.0
Majority		1,672	42.2	N/A
Turnout		3,963	70.1	−13.2
National hold		Swing	N/A	

Witbank by-election, 2 May 1934
Party	Candidate	Votes	%	±%
National	J. T. Bezuidenhout	2,003	56.2	−5.3
Independent	J. C. Miller	1,512	42.4	+23.1
Rejected ballots		49	1.4	+1.0
Majority		491	13.8	−28.4
Turnout		3,564	67.2	−2.9
National hold		Swing	-14.2	

General election 1938: Witbank
Party	Candidate	Votes	%	±%
United	J. T. Bezuidenhout	3,051	64.2	N/A
Purified National	H. I. J. van Rensburg	1,356	28.5	New
Labour	J. S. M. Stone	302	6.4	New
Rejected ballots		43	0.9	+0.5
Majority		1,695	35.7	N/A
Turnout		4,752	79.5	+9.4
United hold		Swing	N/A	
