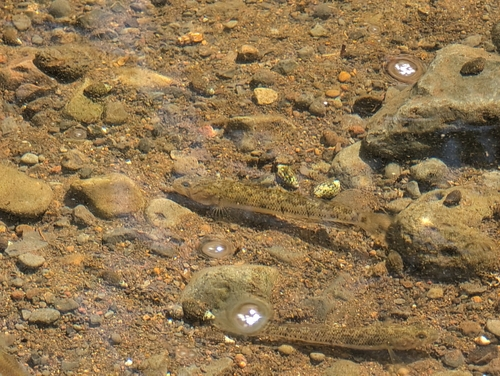

Conservation status
- Vulnerable (NatureServe)

Scientific classification
- Kingdom: Animalia
- Phylum: Chordata
- Class: Actinopterygii
- Order: Gobiiformes
- Family: Oxudercidae
- Genus: Awaous
- Species: A. stamineus

Binomial name
- Awaous stamineus (Eydoux & Souleyet, 1850)

Synonyms
- Gobius stamineus Eydoux & Souleyet, 1850; Chonophorus stamineus (Eydoux & Souleyet, 1850)

= Awaous stamineus =

Species of fish

Awaous stamineus, commonly known as ʻOʻopu nakea, is a species of goby native to the Hawaiian Islands. It has been previously considered a synonym of Awaous guamensis but recent work based upon morphological and genetic differences has recognized Hawaiian populations as being distinct. Consequently, Hawaiian Awaous are now recognized as a valid, distinct species.

== Description and biology ==
ʻOʻopu nakea are omnivores. Analyses of their gut volume have shown to consist 84% of filamentous algae and the other 16% of chironomids (non-biting midges). ʻOʻopu nakea are about 14 inches (36 cm) long and have white streaks with speckles and a dark olive color. They lay eggs downstream where the males and females guard the nest. The males make the nest and attract the females who then lay one clutch a year.

Predators of this species include various birds, including the ʻaukuʻu (black-crowned night heron), and other fishes, including āholehole (dark-margined flagtail), ulua (trevallies), moi (Pacific threadfin), and kākü (great barracuda).

== Distribution and habitat ==
ʻOʻopu nakea are found in slow-moving waters especially on Kauaʻi during their annual spawning run to the stream mouth. ʻOʻopu nakea swim-up stream between 10 and 200 feet (3 and 61 m) in strong currents.

== Human use and cultural significance ==
They are eaten raw or cooked. The usual way to prepare them is by salting them for 12 hours, then wrapping them in ti leaves and placing them over hot coals.
