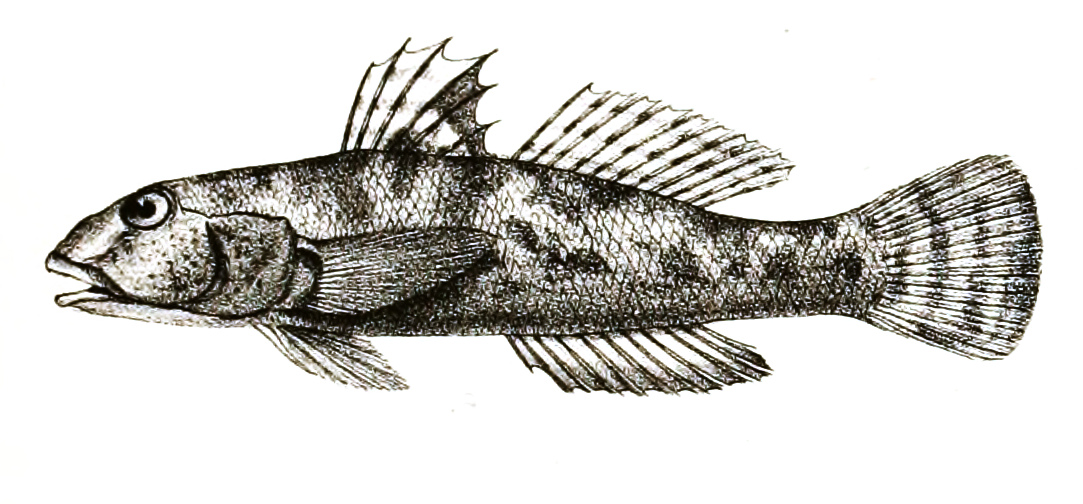

Conservation status
- Data Deficient (IUCN 3.1)

Scientific classification
- Kingdom: Animalia
- Phylum: Chordata
- Class: Actinopterygii
- Order: Gobiiformes
- Family: Oxudercidae
- Genus: Awaous
- Species: A. personatus

Binomial name
- Awaous personatus (Bleeker, 1849)

Synonyms
- Gobius personatus Bleeker, 1849

= Awaous personatus =

Species of fish

Awaous personatus is a species of goby found in Indonesia.

== Size ==
This species reaches a length of 11.1 cm (4.4 in).
