= Awaous fluviatilis =

Conservation status
- Data Deficient (IUCN 3.1)

Scientific classification
- Kingdom: Animalia
- Phylum: Chordata
- Class: Actinopterygii
- Order: Gobiiformes
- Family: Oxudercidae
- Genus: Awaous
- Species: A. fluviatilis

Binomial name
- Awaous fluviatilis (Rao, 1971)

Synonyms
- Chiramenu fluviatilis Rao, 1971

Species of fish

Awaous fluviatilis is a species of goby found in the Indian Ocean.

== Size ==
This species reaches a length of 1.7 cm (0.67 in).
