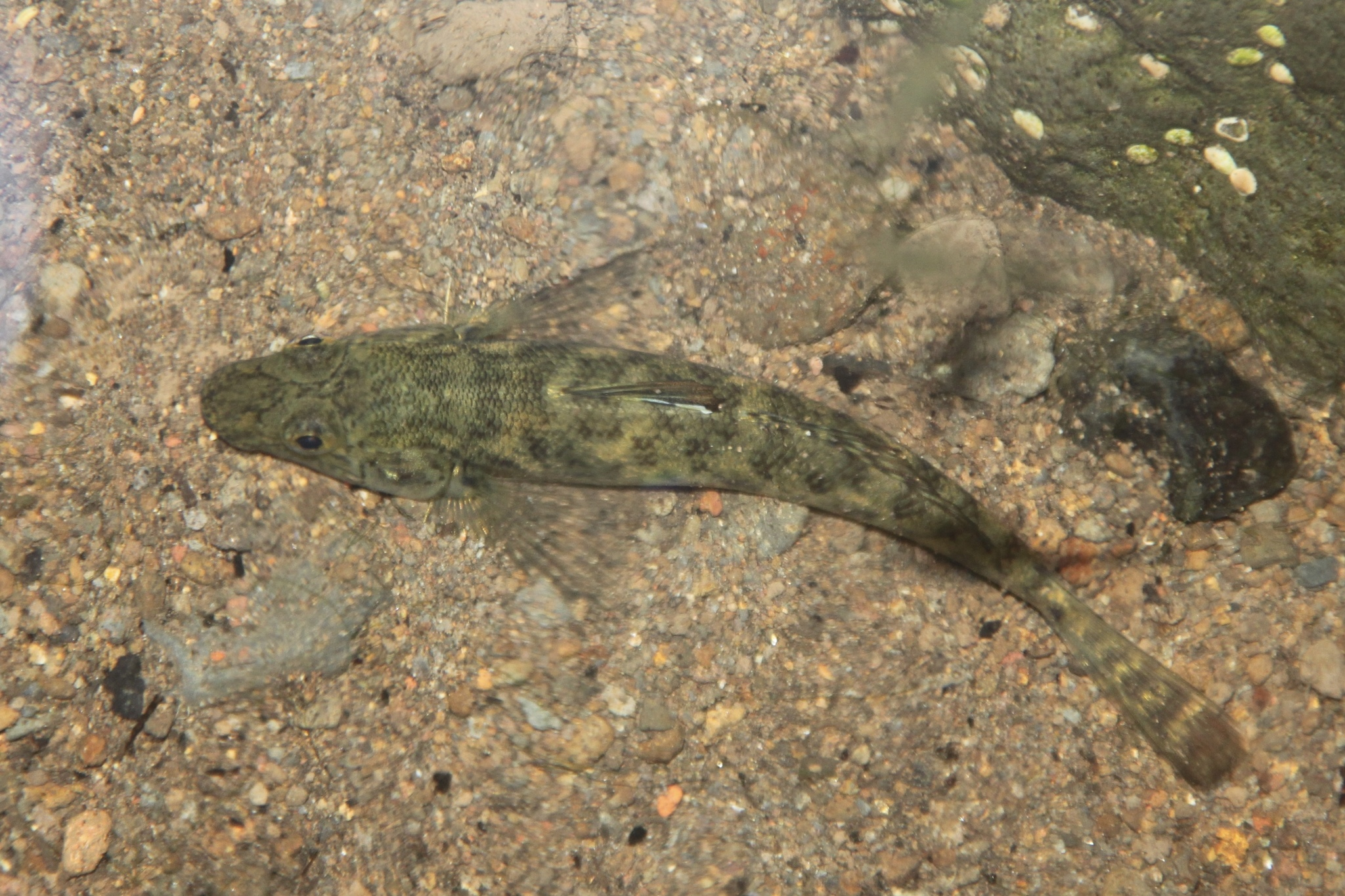

Conservation status
- Vulnerable (IUCN 3.1)

Scientific classification
- Kingdom: Animalia
- Phylum: Chordata
- Class: Actinopterygii
- Order: Gobiiformes
- Family: Oxudercidae
- Genus: Awaous
- Species: A. commersoni

Binomial name
- Awaous commersoni (J. G. Schneider, 1801)

Synonyms
- List: Gobius commersoni Schneider, 1801; Gobius niger Lacepède, 1800; Gobius nigripinnis Valenciennes, 1837; Awaous nigripinnis (Valenciennes, 1837); Gobius commersonii Valenciennes, 1837; Awavus commersoni (Valenciennes, 1837)

= Awaous commersoni =

Species of fish

Awaous commersoni, or Commerson's freshwater goby, is a species of goby found on islands in the south-western Indian Ocean.

== Size ==
This species reaches a length of 25.0 cm (9.8 in).

== Etymology ==
The fish is named in honor of French naturalist Philibert Commerçon (also spelled Commerson, 1727–1773), it is a replacement name for Gobius niger Lacepède 1800 it was based on Commerçon's manuscript description, “Gobius totus niger …”), preoccupied by G. niger Linnaeus 1758 (Gobiidae).
