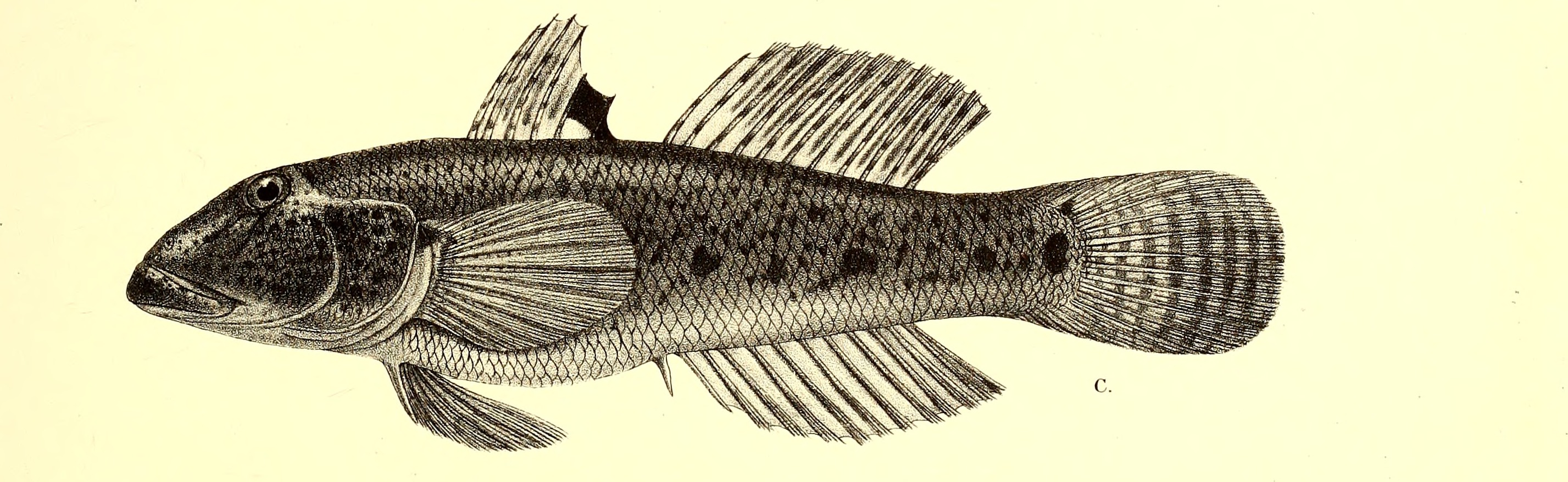
- Awaous ocellaris

Scientific classification
- Kingdom: Animalia
- Phylum: Chordata
- Class: Actinopterygii
- Order: Gobiiformes
- Family: Oxudercidae
- Subfamily: Gobionellinae
- Genus: Awaous; Valenciennes, 1837

Type species
- Gobius ocellaris Broussonet, 1782

Synonyms
- Awaous Steindachner, 1861; Chiramenu Visweswara Rao, 1971; Chonophorus Poey, 1860; Euctenogobius T. N. Gill, 1859; Platygobius Bleeker, 1874; Suiboga S. Y. Pinto, 1960; Trichopharynx J. D. Ogilby, 1898

= Awaous =

Genus of fishes

Awaous is a genus of fish in the family Gobiidae, the gobies. They are native to fresh, marine and brackish waters from Africa to the Americas.

== Species ==
There are currently 21 recognized species in this genus:

- Awaous acritosus Watson, 1994 (Roman nose goby)
- Awaous aeneofuscus (W. K. H. Peters, 1852) (Freshwater goby)
- Awaous banana (Valenciennes, 1837) (River goby)
- Awaous bustamantei (Greeff, 1882)
- Awaous dayi Keith & Mennesson, 2026
- Awaous commersoni (J. G. Schneider, 1801)
- Awaous flavus (Valenciennes, 1837)
- Awaous grammepomus (Bleeker, 1849) (Scribbled goby)
- Awaous guamensis (Valenciennes, 1837)
- Awaous jayakari (Boulenger, 1888)
- Awaous keralaensis Keith & Mennesson, 2026
- Awaous lateristriga (A. H. A. Duméril, 1861) (West African freshwater goby)
- Awaous litturatus (Steindachner, 1861)
- Awaous madagascariensis (Bleeker, 1867)
- Awaous myanmarensis Keith & Mennesson, 2026
- Awaous ocellaris (Broussonet, 1782)
- Awaous stamineus (Eydoux & Souleyet, 1850)
- Awaous stoliczkae (Day, 1871)
- Awaous striatus (Day, 1868)
- Awaous tajasica (M. H. C. Lichtenstein, 1822) (Sand fish)
- Awaous transandeanus (Günther, 1861)

Synonyms

- Awaous fluviatilis (Rao, 1971); valid as A. litturatus
- Awaous macrorhynchus (Bleeker, 1867); valid as A. aeneofuscus
- Awaous melanocephalus (Bleeker, 1849); valid as A. grammepomus
- Awaous motla Seth, Roy, Sura, Puvala, Mishra & Mohapatra, 2023; valid as A. striatus
- Awaous pallidus (Valenciennes, 1837); valid as A. commersoni
- Awaous personatus (Bleeker, 1849); valid as A. grammepomus
