= Awaous grammepomus =

Conservation status
- Least Concern (IUCN 3.1)

Scientific classification
- Kingdom: Animalia
- Phylum: Chordata
- Class: Actinopterygii
- Order: Gobiiformes
- Family: Oxudercidae
- Genus: Awaous
- Species: A. grammepomus

Binomial name
- Awaous grammepomus (Bleeker, 1849)

Synonyms
- Gobius grammepomus Bleeker, 1849

Species of fish

Awaous grammepomus, the Scribbled goby, is a species of goby native to freshwater streams and rivers and brackish estuaries from Sri Lanka to New Guinea with a report of it occurring in Palau. This species can reach a length of 15 centimetres (5.9 in) SL. It is of minor importance to local commercial fisheries and can also be found in the aquarium trade.
