= Awaous melanocephalus =

Conservation status
- Data Deficient (IUCN 3.1)

Scientific classification
- Kingdom: Animalia
- Phylum: Chordata
- Class: Actinopterygii
- Order: Gobiiformes
- Family: Oxudercidae
- Genus: Awaous
- Species: A. melanocephalus

Binomial name
- Awaous melanocephalus (Bleeker, 1849)

Synonyms
- Chonophorus melanocephalus (Bleeker, 1849); Chonorphorus melanocephalus (Bleeker, 1849); Gobius melanocephalus Bleeker, 1849

Species of fish

Awaous melanocephalus, the largesnout goby, is a species of goby that is native to fresh water rivers and streams of India, Sri Lanka, Ryukyu Islands, China, Taiwan, Vietnam, Thailand, Philippines, Indonesia, Papua New Guinea and Solomon Islands. Some suggestions has been recorded from Fiji islands and Mauritius, but not confirmed yet.

Adults inhabit in freshwater streams with clear waters, and some muddy bottoms. It is about 15 cm (5.9 in) in length.
