= Awaous macrorhynchus =

Conservation status
- Least Concern (IUCN 3.1)

Scientific classification
- Kingdom: Animalia
- Phylum: Chordata
- Class: Actinopterygii
- Order: Gobiiformes
- Family: Oxudercidae
- Genus: Awaous
- Species: A. macrorhynchus

Binomial name
- Awaous macrorhynchus (Bleeker, 1867)

Synonyms
- Gobius macrorhynchus Bleeker, 1867; Chonophorus macrorhynchus (Bleeker, 1867); Platygobius macrorhynchus (Bleeker, 1867); Gobius madagascariensis Bleeker, 1867; Platygobius madagascariensis (Bleeker, 1867)

Species of fish

Awaous macrorhynchus is a species of goby endemic to Madagascar where it is known from brackish and fresh waters. This species can reach a length of 38 centimetres (15 in) TL.
