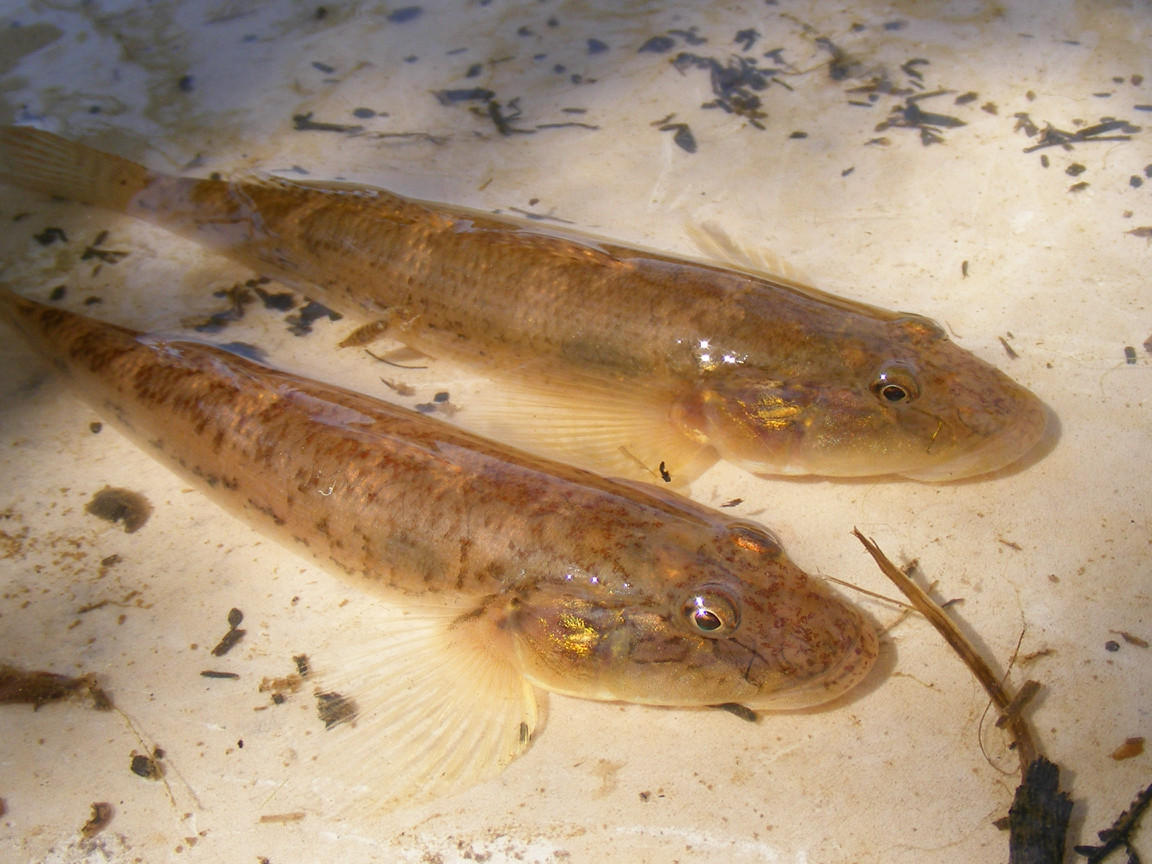

Conservation status
- Least Concern (IUCN 3.1)

Scientific classification
- Kingdom: Animalia
- Phylum: Chordata
- Class: Actinopterygii
- Order: Gobiiformes
- Family: Oxudercidae
- Genus: Awaous
- Species: A. aeneofuscus

Binomial name
- Awaous aeneofuscus (W. K. H. Peters, 1852)

Synonyms
- Gobius aeneofuscus Peters, 1852; Chonophorus aeneofuscus (Peters, 1852); Platygobius aeneofuscus (Peters, 1852); Gobius aenofuscus (Peters, 1852); Platygobius aeonofuscus (Peters, 1852); Gobius louveli Petit, 1936; Gobius louvali Petit, 1936

= Awaous aeneofuscus =

Species of fish

Awaous aeneofuscus, the freshwater goby, is a species of goby found in East Africa.

== Size ==
This species reaches a length of 26.0 cm (10.2 in).
