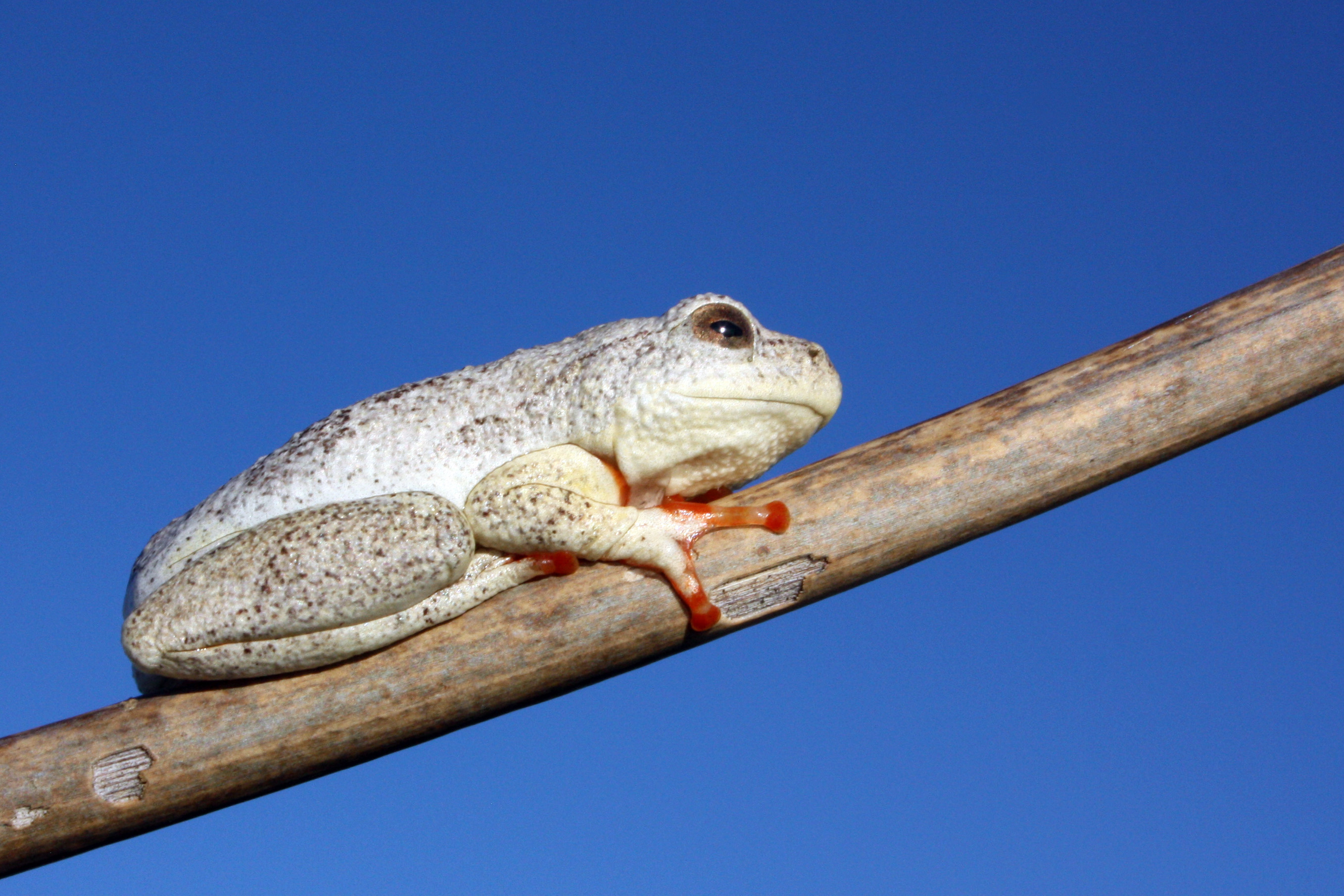
- in Botswana

Conservation status
- Least Concern (IUCN 3.1)

Scientific classification
- Kingdom: Animalia
- Phylum: Chordata
- Class: Amphibia
- Order: Anura
- Family: Hyperoliidae
- Genus: Hyperolius
- Species: H. marmoratus

Binomial name
- Hyperolius marmoratus Rapp, 1842
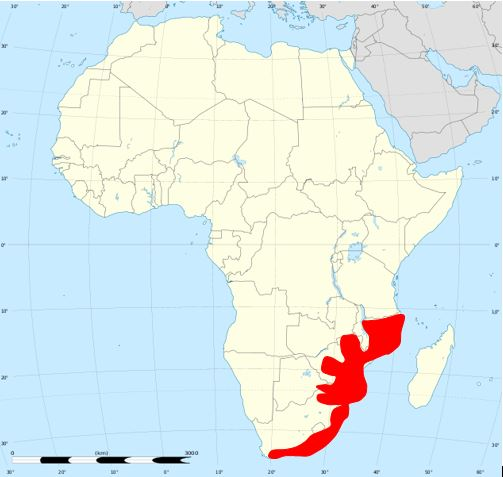

= Marbled reed frog =

Marbled Reed Frog

Species of amphibian

The marbled reed frog or painted reed frog (Hyperolius marmoratus) is a species of frogs in the family Hyperoliidae found in Malawi, Mozambique, South Africa, Eswatini, Zimbabwe, Botswana, Angola, Lesotho, Kenya, Zambia, and Tanzania. It occurs in a wide range of natural habitats, including forests, savannas, shrublands, grasslands, rivers, swamps, freshwater lakes, and intermittent freshwater lakes. It coexists well with humans, and is also found in pastureland, rural gardens, and urban areas. Its range appears to be expanding to the winter rainfall area of the Western Cape.

Species in the genus Hyperolius may display different colouration and patterns during day and night. Daylight colours are usually pale and drab, while their night-time appearance is colourful and eye-catching – see images below.

== Gallery ==
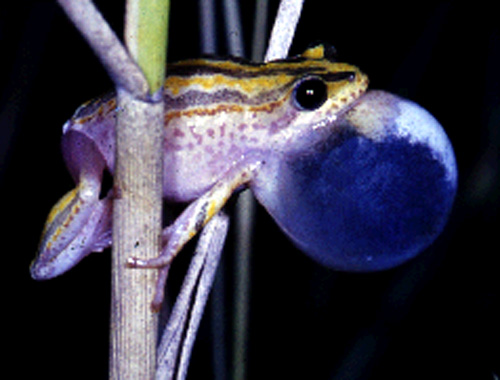

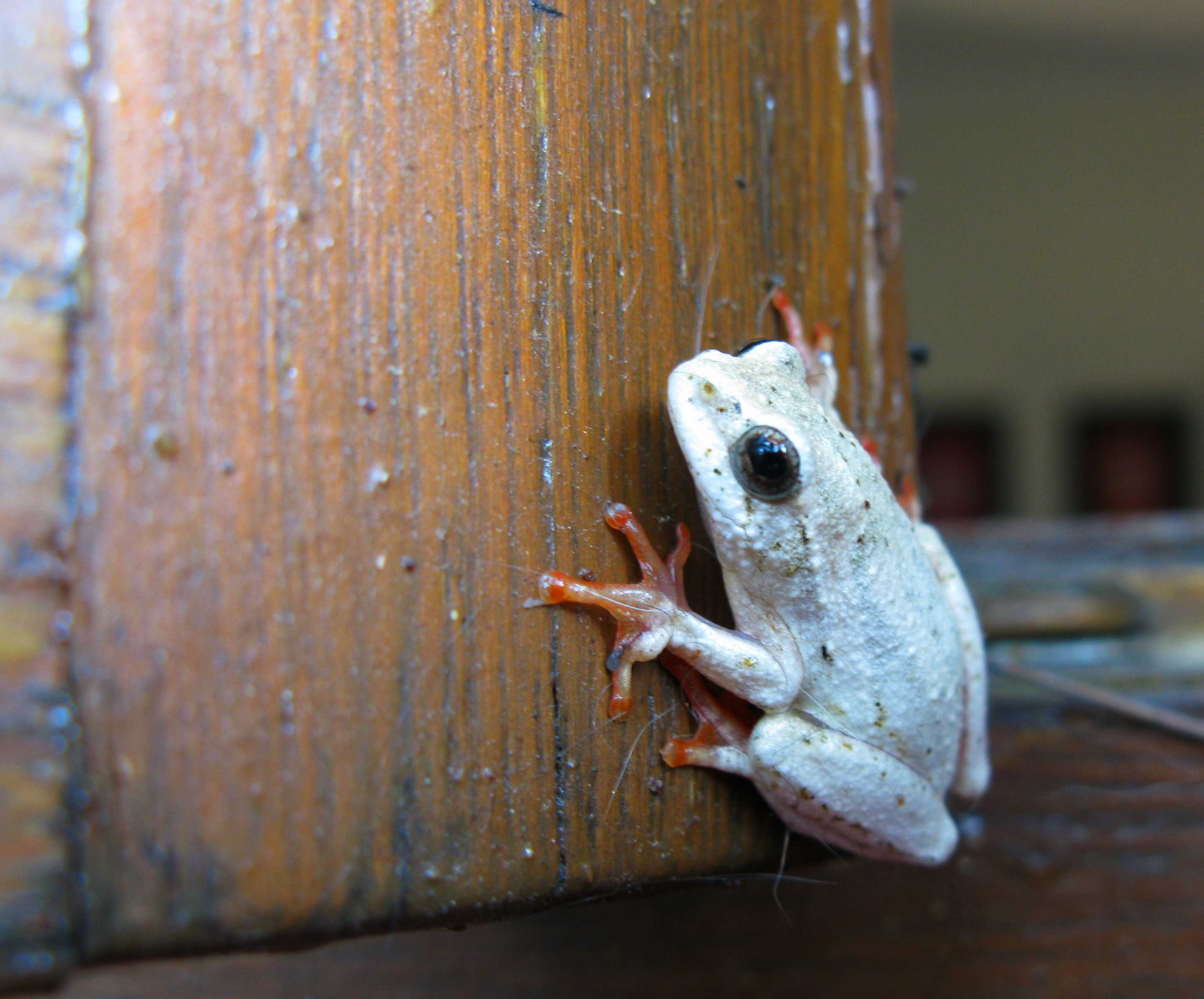

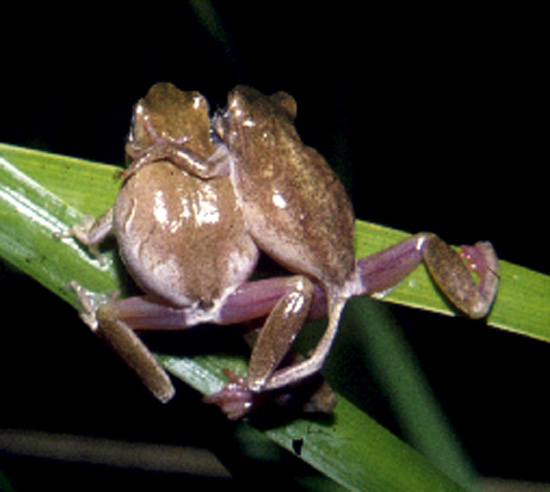

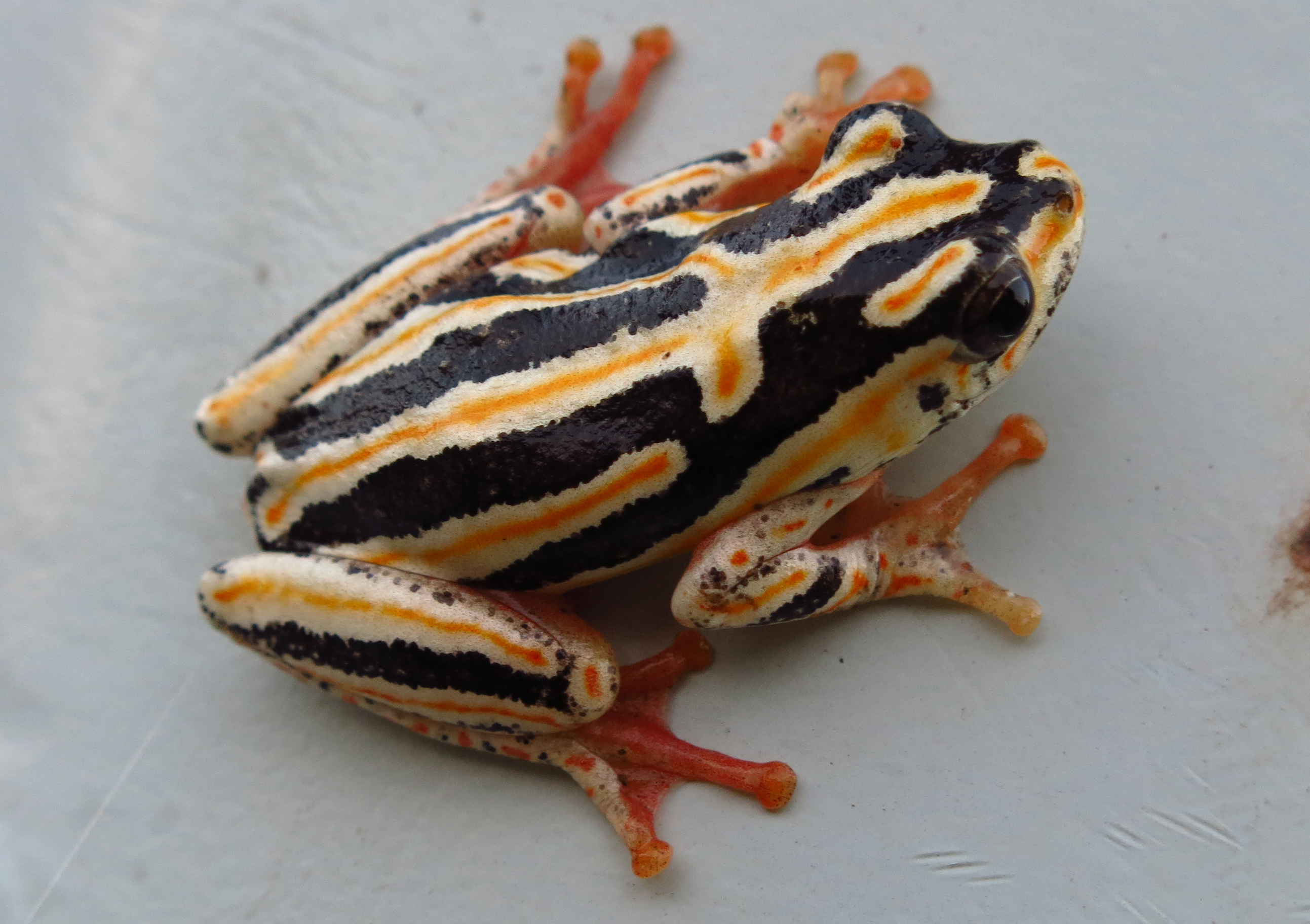
Kruger National Park, South Africa

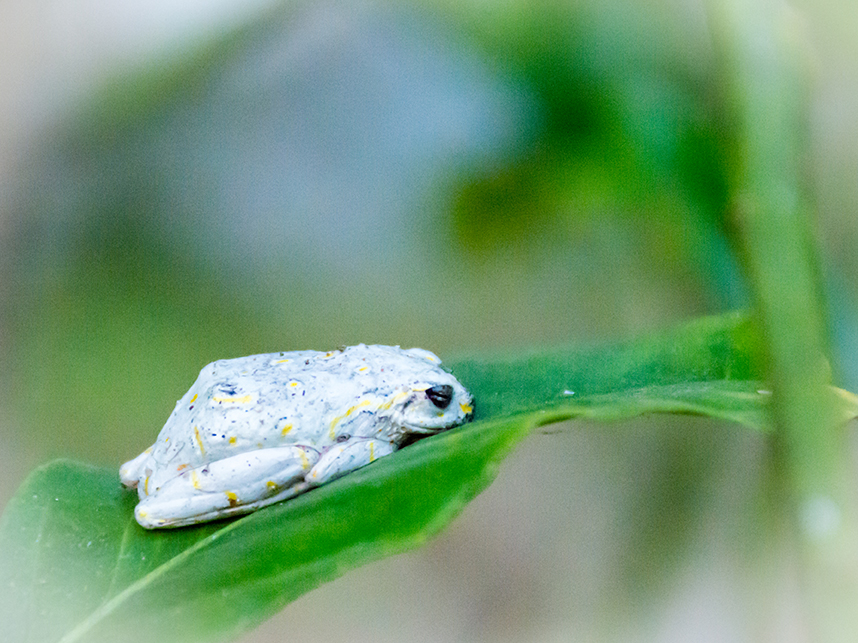
Hermanus, South Africa
