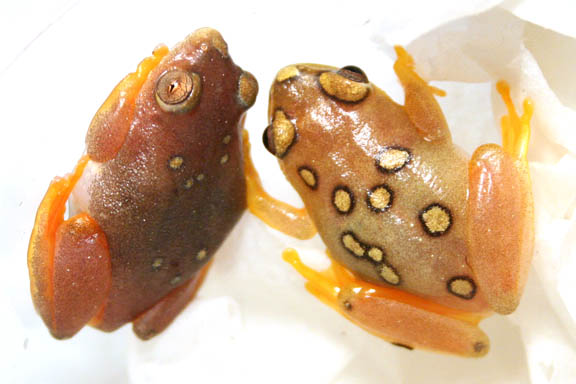
- Hyperolius argus females

Conservation status
- Least Concern (IUCN 3.1)

Scientific classification
- Kingdom: Animalia
- Phylum: Chordata
- Class: Amphibia
- Order: Anura
- Family: Hyperoliidae
- Genus: Hyperolius
- Species: H. argus

Binomial name
- Hyperolius argus Peters, 1854

Synonyms
- Hyperolius flavoviridis Peters, 1854; Hyperolius tettensis Peters, 1854; Hyperolius cinctiventris Cope, 1862; Rappia platycephalus Pfeffer, 1893; Hyperolius ahli Loveridge, 1936; Hyperolius böckii Koesen, 1968

= Hyperolius argus =

Species of amphibian

Hyperolius argus, known under common names Argus reed frog, Argus sedge frog, and Boror reed frog (and many others) is a hyperolid frog found in the eastern coastal plain of Africa from southern Somalia through Kenya, Tanzania, Mozambique, Malawi, Zimbabwe to KwaZulu-Natal in eastern South Africa.

== Description ==
Hyperolius argus is sexually dichromatic: adult males are usually green, and females usually reddish-brown with large white spots. The coloration and pattern show geographic variation.

Both females and males metamorphose to a solid green color without spots—the color of adult males. Under experimental conditions, the time from metamorphosis to the change to a female color pattern took about two months; for a male, the time from metamorphosis to the development of vocal sacs, with spontaneous vocalization and aggression, was about three months.

The females attach the eggs to vegetation below the surface of the water (possibly caused by raising water level). The female can lay in total about 200 eggs in clusters of about 30 eggs.

== Habitat and conservation ==
Hyperolius argus is a common species living near water in low elevation dense, humid savanna and grassland. Breeding takes place in vegetated shallow pans, vleis and marshes, typically in temporary water.

Even though this species does not face major threats, it is affected by urban expansion, agricultural intensification, and introduced species (bass).

== Gallery ==
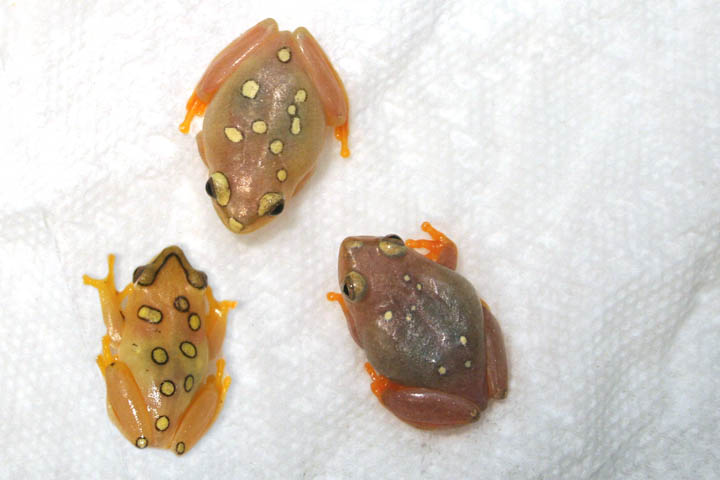
Female reed frogs of different patterns

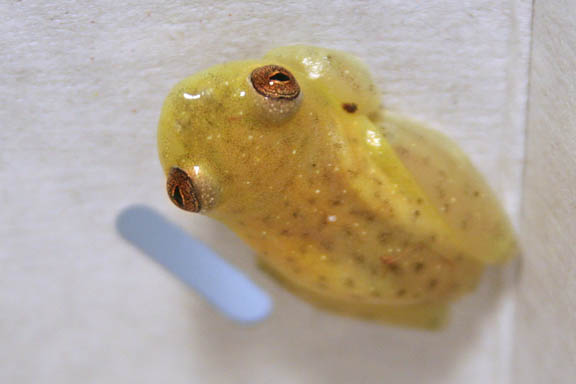
Male reed frog
