= List of municipalities in KwaZulu-Natal =

KwaZulu-Natal is a province of South Africa that is divided, for local government purposes, into one metropolitan municipality (the eThekwini Metropolitan Municipality) and ten district municipalities. The district municipalities are in turn divided into forty-three local municipalities.

In the following map, the district and metropolitan municipalities are labelled in capital letters and shaded in various different colours.

== District and metropolitan municipalities ==
Name	Code	Seat	Area (km^{2})	Population (2016)	Pop. density (per km^{2})
Amajuba District Municipality	DC25	Newcastle	7,102	531,327	74.8
eThekwini Metropolitan Municipality	ETH	Durban	2,556	3,702,231	1,448.5
Harry Gwala District Municipality	DC43	Ixopo	10,386	510,865	49.2
iLembe District Municipality	DC29	KwaDukuza	3,269	657,612	201.2
King Cetshwayo District Municipality	DC28	Richards Bay	8,213	971,135	118.2
Ugu District Municipality	DC21	Port Shepstone	4,791	753,336	157.2
uMgungundlovu District Municipality	DC22	Pietermaritzburg	9,602	1,095,865	114.1
uMkhanyakude District Municipality	DC27	Mkuze	13,855	689,090	49.7
uMzinyathi District Municipality	DC24	Dundee	8,652	554,882	64.1
uThukela District Municipality	DC23	Ladysmith	11,134	706,588	63.5
Zululand District Municipality	DC26	Ulundi	14,799	892,310	60.3

== Local and metropolitan municipalities ==
Name	Code	District	Seat	Area (km^{2})	Population (2022)	Pop. density (per km^{2})
Abaqulusi Local Municipality	KZN263	Zululand	Vryheid	4,314	247,263	57.3
Alfred Duma Local Municipality	KZN238	Uthukela	Ladysmith	3,764	415,036	110.3
Big Five Hlabisa Local Municipality	KZN276	Umkhanyakude	Hlabisa	3,466	131,755	37.97
Dannhauser Local Municipality	KZN254	Amajuba	Dannhauser	1,707	142,750	83.61
Dr Nkosazana Dlamini Zuma Local Municipality	KZN436	Harry Gwala	Creighton	3,602	128,565	35.69
eDumbe Local Municipality	KZN261	Zululand	Paulpietersburg	1,943	96,735	49.79
eMadlangeni Local Municipality	KZN253	Amajuba	Utrecht	3,539	36,948	10.44
Endumeni Local Municipality	KZN241	Umzinyathi	Dundee	1,610	100,085	62.16
eThekwini Metropolitan Municipality	ETH		Durban	2,556	4,239,901	1,659
Greater Kokstad Local Municipality	KZN433	Harry Gwala	Kokstad	2,680	81,676	30.48
Impendle Local Municipality	KZN224	uMgungundlovu	Impendle	1,610	36,648	22.77
Inkosi Langalibalele Local Municipality	KZN237	Uthukela	Estcourt	3,399	230,924	67.95
Johannes Phumani Phungula Local Municipality	KZN434	Harry Gwala	Ixopo	1,669	133,032	79.67
Jozini Local Municipality	KZN272	Umkhanyakude	Jozini	3,442	199,153	57.92
KwaDukuza Local Municipality	KZN292	iLembe	KwaDukuza	735	324,912	439.1
Mandeni Local Municipality	KZN291	iLembe	Mandeni	545	180,939	326.1
Maphumulo Local Municipality	KZN294	iLembe	Maphumulo	896	110,983	123.9
Mkhambathini Local Municipality	KZN226	uMgungundlovu	Camperdown	868	61,660	71.00
Mpofana Local Municipality	KZN223	uMgungundlovu	Mooi River	1,757	33,382	19.02
Msinga Local Municipality	KZN244	Umzinyathi	Tugela Ferry	2,375	206,001	86.73
Msunduzi Local Municipality	KZN225	uMgungundlovu	Pietermaritzburg	751	817,725	1,089
Mthonjaneni Local Municipality	KZN285	King Cetshwayo	Melmoth	1,639	99,289	60.59
Mtubatuba Local Municipality	KZN275	Umkhanyakude	Mtubatuba	1,970	215,869	109.6
Ndwedwe Local Municipality	KZN293	iLembe	Ndwedwe	1,093	165,826	153.7
Newcastle Local Municipality	KZN252	Amajuba	Newcastle	1,856	507,710	273.6
Nkandla Local Municipality	KZN286	King Cetshwayo	Nkandla	1,828	108,896	59.58
Nongoma Local Municipality	KZN265	Zululand	Nongoma	2,182	225,278	103.2
Nqutu Local Municipality	KZN242	Umzinyathi	Nquthu	1,962	201,133	102.5
Okhahlamba Local Municipality	KZN235	Uthukela	Bergville	3,971	143,132	36.04
Ray Nkonyeni Local Municipality	KZN216	Ugu	Port Shepstone	1,487	362,134	243.5
Richmond Local Municipality	KZN227	uMgungundlovu	Richmond	1,231	62,754	50.96
Ulundi Local Municipality	KZN266	Zululand	Ulundi	3,250	221,977	68.29
uMdoni Local Municipality	KZN212	Ugu	Scottburgh	994	156,443	158.1
uMfolozi Local Municipality	KZN281	King Cetshwayo	KwaMbonambi	1,300	159,668	122.8
uMhlabuyalingana Local Municipality	KZN271	Umkhanyakude	Kwangwanase	4,977	191,660	38.51
uMhlathuze Local Municipality	KZN282	King Cetshwayo	Richards Bay	1,233	412,075	334.2
uMlalazi Local Municipality	KZN284	King Cetshwayo	Eshowe	2,214	241,416	109.0
uMngeni Local Municipality	KZN222	uMgungundlovu	Howick	1,520	105,069	69.09
uMshwathi Local Municipality	KZN221	uMgungundlovu	Wartburg	1,866	118,478	63.50
uMuziwabantu Local Municipality	KZN214	Ugu	Harding	1,089	115,780	106.3
Umvoti Local Municipality	KZN245	Umzinyathi	Greytown	2,705	142,042	52.52
Umzimkhulu Local Municipality	KZN435	Harry Gwala	Umzimkhulu	2,436	220,620	90.58
Umzumbe Local Municipality	KZN213	Ugu	Mtwalume	1,221	139,045	113.6
uPhongolo Local Municipality	KZN262	Zululand	Pongola	3,110	151,541	48.73

== Former municipalities ==
These municipalities have been dissolved since the current system of local government was established in 2000.

Name	Code	Dissolved	Fate
Ezinqoleni Local Municipality	KZN215	3 August 2016	Merged to create Ray Nkonyeni Local Municipality
Hibiscus Coast Local Municipality	KZN216	3 August 2016	Merged to create Ray Nkonyeni Local Municipality
Vulamehlo Local Municipality	KZN211	3 August 2016	Annexed by eThekwini Metropolitan Municipality and Umdoni Local Municipality
Emnambithi/Ladysmith Local Municipality	KZN232	3 August 2016	Merged to create Alfred Duma Local Municipality
Indaka Local Municipality	KZN233	3 August 2016	Merged to create Alfred Duma Local Municipality
Umtshezi Local Municipality	KZN234	3 August 2016	Merged to create Inkosi Langalibalele Local Municipality
Imbabazane Local Municipality	KZN236	3 August 2016	Merged to create Inkosi Langalibalele Local Municipality
Big 5 False Bay Local Municipality	KZN273	3 August 2016	Merged to create Big Five Hlabisa Local Municipality
Hlabisa Local Municipality	KZN274	3 August 2016	Merged to create Big Five Hlabisa Local Municipality
Ntambanana Local Municipality	KZN283	3 August 2016	Annexed by Mthonjaneni, uMfolozi and uMhlathuze Local Municipalities
Ingwe Local Municipality	KZN431	3 August 2016	Merged to create Dr Nkosazana Dlamini-Zuma Local Municipality
Kwa Sani Local Municipality	KZN432	3 August 2016	Merged to create Dr Nkosazana Dlamini-Zuma Local Municipality
