= Big Five Hlabisa Local Municipality elections =

Local elections in KwaZulu-Natal, South Africa

The Big Five Hlabisa Local Municipality council consists of twenty-seven members elected by mixed-member proportional representation. Fourteen councillors are elected by first-past-the-post voting in fourteen wards, while the remaining thirteen are chosen from party lists so that the total number of party representatives is proportional to the number of votes received.

It was established for the August 2016 local elections by the merging of The Big 5 False Bay and Hlabisa local municipalities.

In the election of 4 November 2026 no party obtained a majority. The Inkatha Freedom Party (IFP) received the most seats with twelve.

== Results ==
The following table shows the composition of the council and its predecessors after past elections.

=== The Big Five False Bay ===
Event	ANC	IFP	NFP	Other	Total
2000 election	1	6	—	—	7
2006 election	2	5	—	0	7
2011 election	3	3	1	0	7

=== Hlabisa ===
Event	ANC	IFP	NFP	Other	Total
2000 election	3	34	—	—	37
2006 election	6	30	—	1	37
2011 election	4	8	4	0	16

=== Big Five Hlabisa ===
Event	ANC	EFF	IFP	NFP	MKP	Other	Total
2016 election	11	—	13	—	—	1	15
2021 election	9	1	15	1	—	1	27
2026 election	8	1	12	0	6	0	27

== December 2000 election ==
The following table shows the results of the 2000 election.

=== The Big Five False Bay ===
Party	Ward			List			Total seats
Party	Votes	%	Seats	Votes	%	Seats	Total seats
Inkatha Freedom Party	4,064	80.30	4	4,017	79.81	2	6
African National Congress	997	19.70	0	1,016	20.19	1	1
Total	5,061	100.00	4	5,033	100.00	3	7
Valid votes	5,061	96.81		5,033	96.58		
Invalid/blank votes	167	3.19		178	3.42		
Total votes	5,228	100.00		5,211	100.00		
Registered voters/turnout	8,889	58.81		8,889	58.62		

=== Hlabisa ===
Party	Ward			List			Total seats
Party	Votes	%	Seats	Votes	%	Seats	Total seats
Inkatha Freedom Party	28,710	92.16	19	30,555	92.00	15	34
African National Congress	2,444	7.84	0	2,656	8.00	3	3
Total	31,154	100.00	19	33,211	100.00	18	37
Valid votes	31,154	97.85		33,211	97.86		
Invalid/blank votes	684	2.15		725	2.14		
Total votes	31,838	100.00		33,936	100.00		
Registered voters/turnout	67,804	46.96		67,804	50.05		

== March 2006 election ==
The following table shows the results of the 2006 election.

=== The Big Five False Bay ===
Party	Ward			List			Total seats
Party	Votes	%	Seats	Votes	%	Seats	Total seats
Inkatha Freedom Party	5,064	67.48	4	5,009	66.93	1	5
African National Congress	2,080	27.71	0	2,124	28.38	2	2
National Democratic Convention	177	2.36	0	195	2.61	0	0
Democratic Alliance	184	2.45	0	156	2.08	0	0
Total	7,505	100.00	4	7,484	100.00	3	7
Valid votes	7,505	98.71		7,484	98.43		
Invalid/blank votes	98	1.29		119	1.57		
Total votes	7,603	100.00		7,603	100.00		
Registered voters/turnout	13,323	57.07		13,323	57.07		

=== Hlabisa ===
Party	Ward			List			Total seats
Party	Votes	%	Seats	Votes	%	Seats	Total seats
Inkatha Freedom Party	30,832	81.30	19	30,765	81.07	11	30
African National Congress	5,871	15.48	0	5,998	15.81	6	6
National Democratic Convention	707	1.86	0	816	2.15	1	1
Democratic Alliance	514	1.36	0	368	0.97	0	0
Total	37,924	100.00	19	37,947	100.00	18	37
Valid votes	37,924	97.62		37,947	98.18		
Invalid/blank votes	925	2.38		702	1.82		
Total votes	38,849	100.00		38,649	100.00		
Registered voters/turnout	70,410	55.18		70,410	54.89		

== May 2011 election ==
The following table shows the results of the 2011 election.

=== The Big Five False Bay ===
Party	Ward			List			Total seats
Party	Votes	%	Seats	Votes	%	Seats	Total seats
African National Congress	4,252	42.52	2	4,334	43.34	1	3
Inkatha Freedom Party	4,062	40.62	2	4,110	41.10	1	3
National Freedom Party	1,526	15.26	0	1,458	14.58	1	1
African Christian Democratic Party	159	1.59	0	98	0.98	0	0
Total	9,999	100.00	4	10,000	100.00	3	7
Valid votes	9,999	98.36		10,000	98.32		
Invalid/blank votes	167	1.64		171	1.68		
Total votes	10,166	100.00		10,171	100.00		
Registered voters/turnout	16,239	62.60		16,239	62.63		

=== Hlabisa ===
In 2011 a substantial part of the Hlabisa municipality's land area, including more than half of its population, was transferred to the Mtubatuba Local Municipality. Consequently, the council was reduced from 37 seats to 16 seats.

Party	Ward			List			Total seats
Party	Votes	%	Seats	Votes	%	Seats	Total seats
Inkatha Freedom Party	8,573	47.06	6	8,502	46.64	2	8
African National Congress	5,052	27.73	1	5,076	27.85	3	4
National Freedom Party	4,559	25.02	1	4,561	25.02	3	4
Democratic Alliance	35	0.19	0	90	0.49	0	0
Total	18,219	100.00	8	18,229	100.00	8	16
Valid votes	18,219	98.23		18,229	98.29		
Invalid/blank votes	329	1.77		318	1.71		
Total votes	18,548	100.00		18,547	100.00		
Registered voters/turnout	28,299	65.54		28,299	65.54		

== August 2016 election ==
The Big Five False Bay and Hlabisa municipalities were merged at the time of the 2016 election. The following table shows the results of the election.

Party	Ward			List			Total seats
Party	Votes	%	Seats	Votes	%	Seats	Total seats
Inkatha Freedom Party	17,758	51.77	8	18,125	52.73	5	13
African National Congress	14,743	42.98	5	14,999	43.63	6	11
Democratic Alliance	769	2.24	0	775	2.25	1	1
Economic Freedom Fighters	603	1.76	0	475	1.38	0	0
Independent candidates	430	1.25	0				0
Total	34,303	100.00	13	34,374	100.00	12	25
Valid votes	34,303	98.31		34,374	98.47		
Invalid/blank votes	591	1.69		535	1.53		
Total votes	34,894	100.00		34,909	100.00		
Registered voters/turnout	54,748	63.74		54,748	63.76		

== November 2021 election ==
The following table shows the results of the 2021 election.

Party	Ward			List			Total seats
Party	Votes	%	Seats	Votes	%	Seats	Total seats
Inkatha Freedom Party	16,908	53.93	13	17,968	57.25	2	15
African National Congress	10,206	32.56	0	10,602	33.78	9	9
Economic Freedom Fighters	1,043	3.33	0	1,093	3.48	1	1
Independent candidates	1,701	5.43	1				1
National Freedom Party	665	2.12	0	630	2.01	1	1
Democratic Alliance	338	1.08	0	360	1.15	0	0
KZN Independence	211	0.67	0	392	1.25	0	0
Independent Alliance	130	0.41	0	183	0.58	0	0
African Christian Democratic Party	56	0.18	0	45	0.14	0	0
Abantu Batho Congress	56	0.18	0	42	0.13	0	0
United Christian Democratic Party	32	0.10	0	39	0.12	0	0
African Transformation Movement	3	0.01	0	29	0.09	0	0
Total	31,349	100.00	14	31,383	100.00	13	27
Valid votes	31,349	98.51		31,383	98.57		
Invalid/blank votes	475	1.49		455	1.43		
Total votes	31,824	100.00		31,838	100.00		
Registered voters/turnout	56,212	56.61		56,212	56.64		

== November 2026 election ==
The following table shows the results of the 2026 election.

Party	Ward			List			Total seats
Party	Votes	%	Seats	Votes	%	Seats	Total seats
Inkatha Freedom Party	15,585	43.33	10	16,064	44.78	2	12
African National Congress	9,669	26.88	3	9,760	27.21	5	8
uMkhonto weSizwe Party	7,529	20.93	1	7,972	22.22	5	6
Independent candidates	1,542	4.29	0				0
Economic Freedom Fighters	421	1.17	0	657	1.83	1	1
National Freedom Party	489	1.36	0	488	1.36	0	0
Democratic Alliance	326	0.91	0	338	0.94	0	0
African Transformation Movement	74	0.21	0	119	0.33	0	0
National Peoples Ambassadors	82	0.23	0	97	0.27	0	0
National Community Liberation	67	0.19	0	76	0.21	0	0
United Christian Democratic Party	54	0.15	0	80	0.22	0	0
Jozini Congress	29	0.08	0	70	0.20	0	0
African Economic Freedom	33	0.09	0	56	0.16	0	0
South African Communist Party	31	0.09	0	52	0.14	0	0
Afrika Mayibuye Movement	38	0.11	0	43	0.12	0	0
Afrika Unite Congress	2	0.01	0				0
Total	35,971	100.00	14	35,872	100.00	13	27
Valid votes	35,971	99.01		35,872	98.79		
Invalid/blank votes	360	0.99		438	1.21		
Total votes	36,331	100.00		36,310	100.00		
Registered voters/turnout	63,355	57.35		63,355	57.31		
