= Shikishela =

- Location within KwaZulu-Natal Location within South Africa
- Coordinates: 28°17′56″S 32°14′36″E
- Country: South Africa
- Province: KwaZulu-Natal
- District: uMkhanyakude
- Municipality: Mtubatuba

Area
  - Total: 41.04 km^{2} (15.85 sq mi)

Population (2011)
  - Total: 6,905
  - Density: 168.3/km^{2} (435.8/sq mi)

Racial makeup (2011)
  - Black African: 99.4%
  - Coloured: 0.1%
  - Indian/Asian: 0.3%
  - White: 0.1%
  - Other: 0.1%

First languages (2011)
  - Zulu: 93.4%
  - S. Ndebele: 1.9%
  - English: 1.7%
  - Tswana: 1.3%
  - Other: 1.8%
- Time zone: UTC+2 (SAST)

Shikishela is a rural area in Umkhanyakude District Municipality in the KwaZulu-Natal province of South Africa.
