= Simpiwe Tshabalala =

South African lawyer and corporate executive

Simphiwe Tshabalala
- Born: 15 December 1967 (age 58); Hlabisa, Umkhanyakude; KwaZulu-Natal, South Africa
- Education: Rhodes University; Notre Dame Law School; University of the Witwatersrand; Harvard University
- Occupations: Lawyer, Businessman and Banker
- Years active: 1994 - present
- Title: Chief Executive Officer at Standard Bank Group
- Term: 2013 - present
- Predecessor: Ben Kruger

Simpiwe Tshabalala (born 15 December 1967), also Simphiwe Tshabalala, commonly known as Sim Tshabalala, is a South African lawyer, businessman and corporative executive. He is the Group CEO, of the Standard Bank Group, the largest banking group on the African continent, with total assets of more than ZAR:3.1 trillion (US$164.25 billion), as of June 2024.

== Background and education ==
Tshabalala was born on 15 December 1967 in Hlabisa, Umkhanyakude, KwaZulu-Natal, South Africa. He grew up in Soweto. He graduated with a High School Diploma from Sacred Heart College, Johannesburg.

He studied at Rhodes University, graduating with a Bachelor of Arts degree in 1988 and a Bachelor of Laws two years later. In 1993, he graduated at the top of his class with a Master of Laws from Notre Dame University in the United States. He returned to South Africa and was admitted to the South African Bar. Later, he obtained a Higher Diploma in Taxation Law from the University of the Witwatersrand. He also attended and completed the Advanced Management Programme from Harvard University in 2006.

== Career ==
He joined Real Africa Durolink Investment Bank in 1994, working in the bank's "structured finance division" until 2000.

In 2000, he was hired by Standard Bank and was assigned to the Project Finance Division. One year later he was appointed to the group's executive committee. He quickly rose through the ranks and served as the managing director of "Stanbic Africa Holdings Limited", before working as the chief executive of the Personal and Business Banking operation for Standard Bank South Africa.

In 2008 he was appointed CEO of Standard Bank South Africa, and one of three Deputy CEOs of Standard Bank Group. In 2012, he was given additional responsibility for Corporate and Investment Banking (CIB) in South Africa. In 2013 he was promoted to joint CEO of the Standard Bank Group, serving in that role with co-CEO, Ben Kruger. In 2017 Kruger relinquished his role and Tshabalala became the sole Group CEO. He is reported to be a strong advocate and practitioner of gender equality and women empowerment.

- Note: "Stanbic Africa is the name Standard Bank uses for its operations in some parts of Africa to avoid confusion with UK-based lender Standard Chartered".

== Other considerations ==
Simpiwe Tshabalala is the Vice President and Treasurer of the Institute of International Finance. He is a Fellow of the Institute of Bankers of South Africa and an Honorary Professor at the University of Stellenbosch Business School.

In March 2024, he was ranked "among the 10 Top Bank CEOs" in the 2024 Brand Guardianship Index. He supports the South African government's pursuit of a middle-of-the-road free-market economy and a non-aligned geo-political path.

== See also ==
- Sello Moloko

| Preceded by Ben Kruger (co-CEO) | Chief Executive Officer of Standard Bank Group Limited; 2013 - | Succeeded by Incumbent |
