= Hluhluwe River =

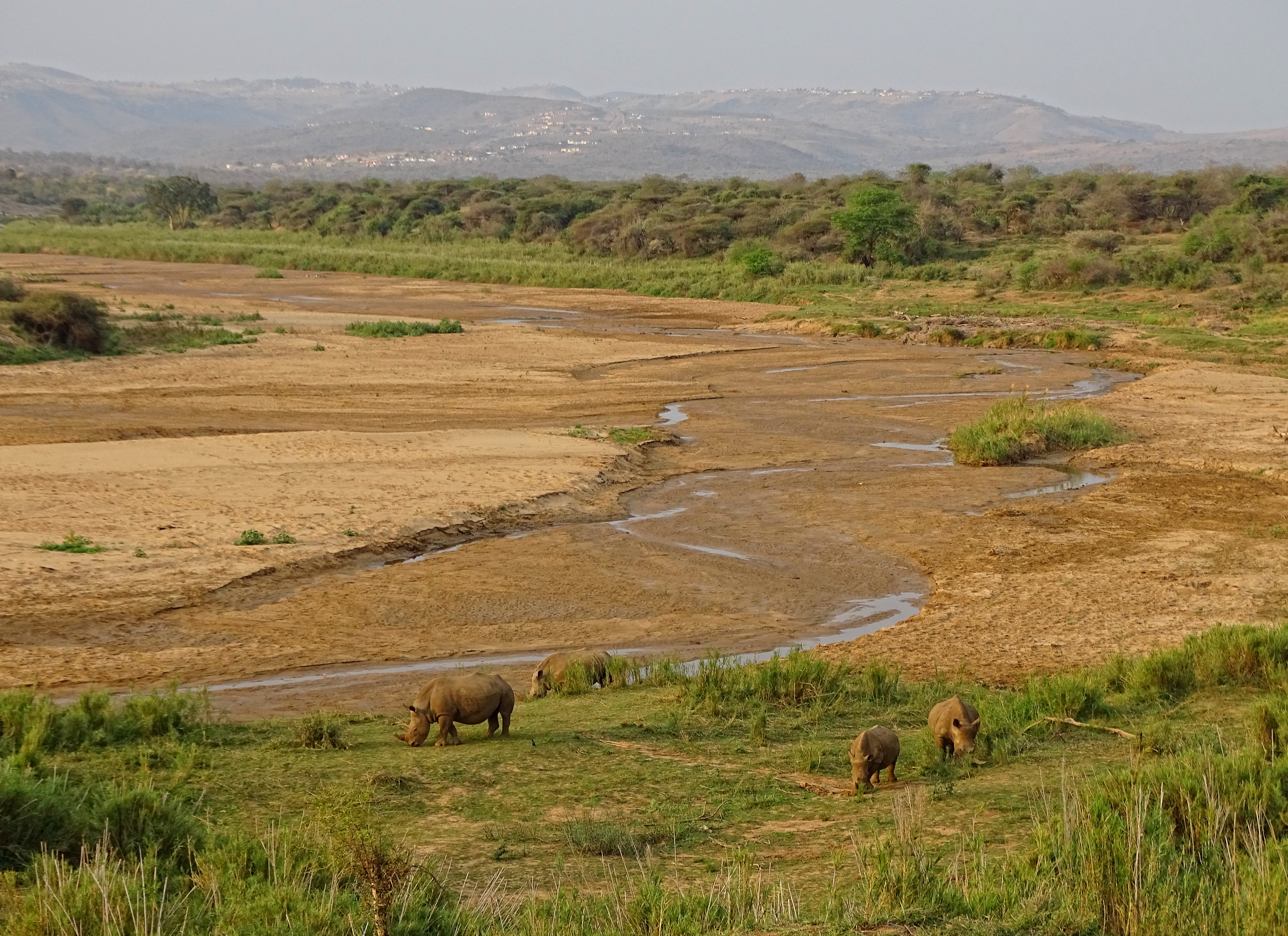
- A semi-dry river bend inside Hluhluwe–Imfolozi Park

- Location of the mouth in South Africa

Location
- Country: South Africa
- Province: KwaZulu-Natal

Physical characteristics
- Mouth
  - location: KwaZulu-Natal, South Africa
  - coordinates: 28°02′23″S 32°21′31″E

The Hluhluwe River originates in the Hluhluwe Game Reserve, KwaZulu-Natal, South Africa. It rises in the Nongoma district and runs northeast through Hlabisa and the Hluhluwe Dam, beyond which it converges with the Nyalazi River to become the St Lucia River at Lake St Lucia. Its name is derived from the Hluhluwe creeper, known as umHluhluwe in Zulu, which occurs on the river's banks.
