= The Big Five False Bay Local Municipality =

Big Five False Bay
- Local municipality
- Seal

- Location in KwaZulu-Natal
- Coordinates: 28°01′S 32°16′E
- Country: South Africa
- Province: KwaZulu-Natal
- District: uMkhanyakude
- Seat: Hluhluwe
- Wards: 4

Government
  - Type: Municipal council
  - Mayor: Thembitshe Comfort Khumalo

Area
  - Total: 2,121 km^{2} (819 sq mi)

Population (2011)
  - Total: 35,258
  - Density: 16.62/km^{2} (43.05/sq mi)

Racial makeup (2011)
  - Black African: 95.8%
  - Coloured: 0.3%
  - Indian/Asian: 0.2%
  - White: 3.2%

First languages (2011)
  - Zulu: 93.2%
  - English: 2.0%
  - Afrikaans: 1.5%
  - Southern Ndebele: 1.2%
  - Other: 2.1%
- Time zone: UTC+2 (SAST)
- Municipal code: KZN273

The Big Five False Bay was an administrative area in the Umkhanyakude District of KwaZulu-Natal in South Africa.

The municipality was named after the Big Five animals (Lion, Elephant, Leopard, Cape Buffalo and Rhino) which are found in the game reserves that are located in the area e.g. the Hluhluwe game reserve, the Mfolozi game reserve and the Khinda game reserve. False Bay is part of the Greater St Lucia Wetlands Park and it forms part of the newly established municipality.

After municipal elections on 3 August 2016 it was merged into the larger Big Five Hlabisa Local Municipality.

== Main places ==
The 2001 census divided the municipality into the following main places:

Place	Code	Area (km^{2})	Population
Hlabisa	53401	30.01	30
Hluhluwe Township	53403	0.78	1,261
Hluhluwe	53402	7.11	992
Makhasa	53404	72.29	10,314
Mdletshe	53405	30.75	6
Mnqobokazi	53406	111.28	7,953
Nibela	53407	99.98	8,423
Remainder of the municipality	53408	809.11	2,134

== Politics ==
The municipal council consisted of seven members elected by mixed-member proportional representation. Four councillors were elected by first-past-the-post voting in four wards, while the remaining three were chosen from party lists so that the total number of party representatives was proportional to the number of votes received. In the election of 18 May 2011 no party obtained a majority, and the African National Congress (ANC) and the National Freedom Party (NFP) formed a coalition to govern the municipality. The following table shows the results of the election.

Party	Votes				Seats		
Party	Ward	List	Total	%	Ward	List	Total
ANC	4,252	4,334	8,586	42.9	2	1	3
IFP	4,062	4,110	8,172	40.9	2	1	3
NFP	1,526	1,458	2,984	14.9	0	1	1
ACDP	159	98	257	1.3	0	0	0
Total	9,999	10,000	19,999	100.0	4	3	7
Spoilt votes	167	171	338				
