= Bhekindoda =

- Location within KwaZulu-Natal Location within South Africa
- Coordinates: 27.234°S 32.144°E
- Country: South Africa
- Province: KwaZulu-Natal
- District: uMkhanyakude
- Municipality: Jozini

Area
  - Total: 71.69 km^{2} (27.68 sq mi)

Population (2011)
  - Total: 3,662
  - Density: 51.08/km^{2} (132.3/sq mi)

Racial makeup (2011)
  - Black African: 99.9%
  - Coloured: 0.1%
  - White: 0.1%

First languages (2011)
  - Zulu: 95.5%
  - S. Ndebele: 1.5%
  - Other: 3.0%
- Time zone: UTC+2 (SAST)

Bhekindoda is a town in Umkhanyakude District Municipality in the KwaZulu-Natal province of South Africa.
