= Monkey rope =

Monkey rope is a common name for several plants and may refer to:

- Dalbergia armata, a species in the family Fabaceae native to Africa
- Parsonsia straminea, a species in the family Apocynaceae native to Australia
