= Beauty Ngxongo =

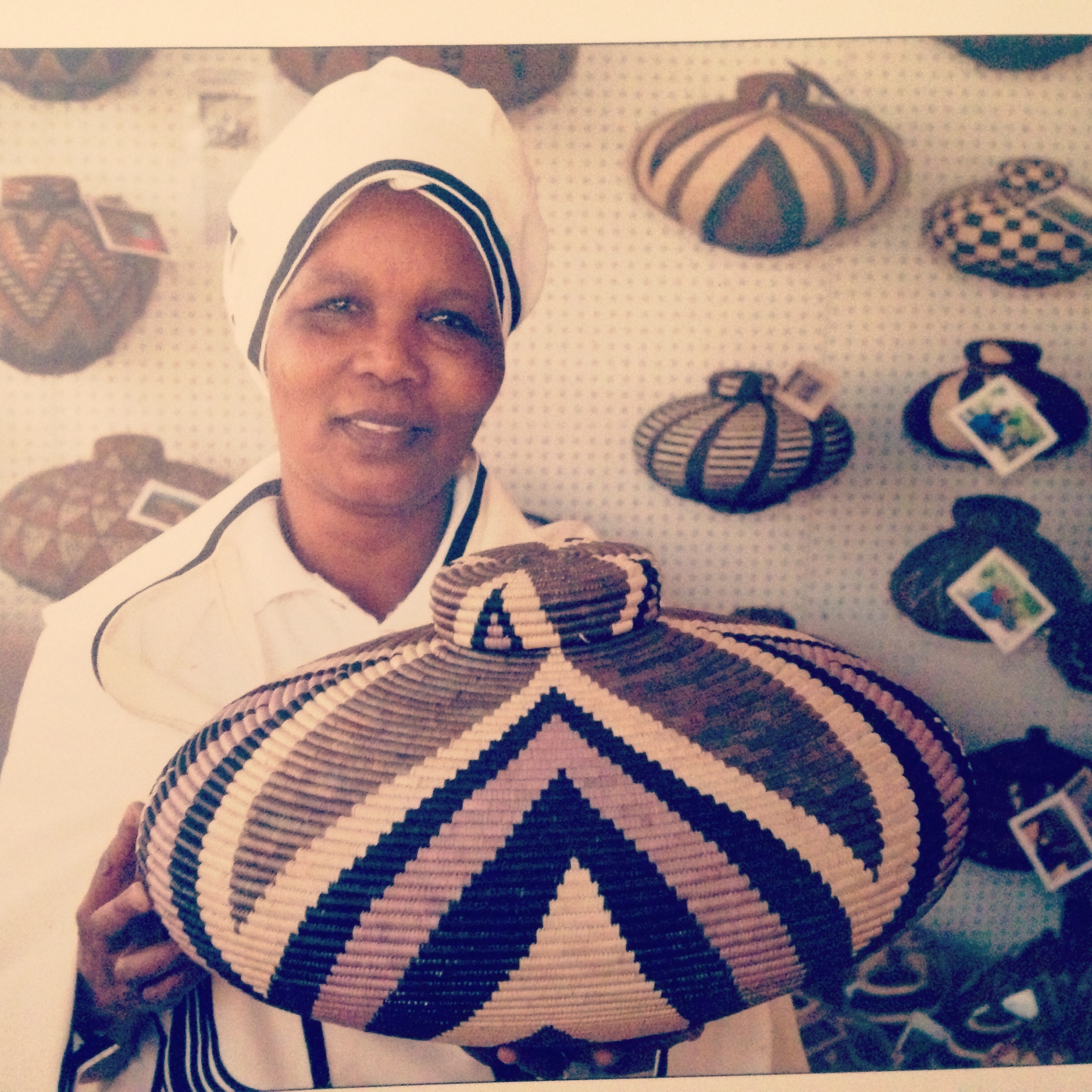
- Ngxongo in 2011
- Born: Beauty Batimbele Ngxongo; 1953 (age 72–73); KwaZulu-Natal province, South Africa
- Occupation: Basket weaver

Beauty Batimbele Ngxongo (born 1953) is a South African master weaver of Zulu baskets. Her baskets have reached international fame. She lives in Hlabisa, in the KwaZulu-Natal province of South Africa.

== Biography ==
Ngxongo wove doormats and table mats in her childhood. In the 1990s, a neighbor taught Ngxongo how to make intricate basket designs using local natural products (like grasses and Ilala palm leaves). A single Zulu basket that holds water take months to complete. By 2012, she employed 13 women to help her workshop. Finding buyers can be difficult as plastic containers are so easily available. However, she has collaborated with two contemporary designers to create what they call the Hlabisa Bench. The bench's shape channels the profiles of the hills of Hlabisa, the village where Ngxongo and her fellow workers live.

Her work can be found in museum collections including at the Metropolitan Museum of Art, the Smithsonian Institution, the Samuel P. Harn Museum of Art, and the Fowler Museum at the University of California, Los Angeles (UCLA). Additionally, her work is part of the MTN Art Collection, a private, corporate art collection in Johannesburg.

== See also ==
- Basket weaving
