= Hluhluwe =

- Location within KwaZulu-Natal Location within South Africa
- Coordinates: 28°01′8″S 32°16′3″E
- Country: South Africa
- Province: KwaZulu-Natal
- District: Umkhanyakude
- Municipality: Big Five Hlabisa

Area
  - Total: 8.05 km^{2} (3.11 sq mi)
- Elevation: 65 m (213 ft)

Population (2011)
  - Total: 3,830
  - Density: 476/km^{2} (1,230/sq mi)

Racial makeup (2011)
  - Black African: 87.7%
  - Coloured: 1.1%
  - Indian/Asian: 0.4%
  - White: 7.9%
  - Other: 2.8%

First languages (2011)
  - Zulu: 86.1%
  - Afrikaans: 5.0%
  - English: 3.5%
  - S. Ndebele: 1.3%
  - Other: 4.0%
- Time zone: UTC+2 (SAST)
- Postal code (street): 3960
- PO box: 3960
- Area code: 035

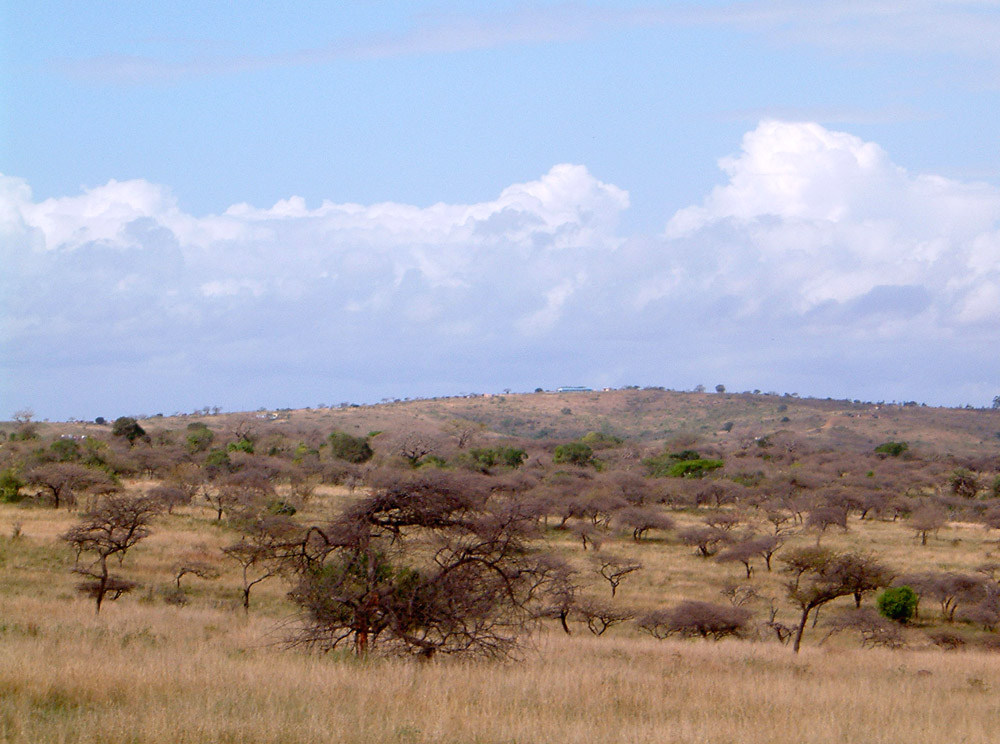
HluHluwe-Umfolozi Game Reserve, South Africa.

Hluhluwe (locally /ʃluːˈʃluːweɪ/ shloo-SHLOO-way; Zulu pronunciation: [ɬuɬuw'e]) is a small town in northern KwaZulu-Natal, South Africa. It is situated between iSimangaliso Wetland Park and Hluhluwe–iMfolozi Park on the banks of the Hluhluwe River. Hluhluwe is situated on the elephant coast, an area known for its national parks, natural diversity and cultural heritage. Although relatively undeveloped the area is of growing interest to international tourists and travelers. Several local and international movies have been filmed in Hluhluwe, such as I Dreamed of Africa, Ghost Son, and documentaries filmed in the surrounding national parks.

Timber, sugar, and pineapples are intensively grown in the area, which produces over 95% of South Africa's queen pineapples. Other agricultural crops are sugar-cane, sisal, cotton, tomatoes, and chilies. Due to traditional settlement patterns and customs, activity is still low in some areas.

Hluhluwe is considered the hub of tourism in KwaZulu-Natal with accommodations ranging from budget facilities to five-star game lodges. Hluhluwe is a service centre to the surrounding area. The town is named after the thorny rope climber Dalbergia armata (umHluhluwe in Zulu), which is found among the forest vegetation types in Hluhluwe–iMfolozi Park.

== Attractions ==
The main attractions of Hluhluwe are its five major groups of large animals (elephants, rhinos, buffaloes, lions, and leopards), the Hluhluwe-iMfolozi game reserve, iSimangaliso wetlands park (formerly known as St Lucia Wetlands Park), Indian Ocean beaches (accessed through St Lucia or Sodwana bay), and the cultural heritage of the Zulu people.

Activities in Hluhluwe include safari expeditions, scuba diving, horse riding, walking trails, bird watching, parks with crocodiles and snakes, canoeing, cruises, mountain biking, and villages offering cultural interactions. Safaris for viewing and hunting game are generally guarded with fees paid to the controlling eMdletsheni tribal authority.

== Sports ==
Hluhluwe annually hosts the RIS Hluhluwe Rhino Charge mountain bike race, part of the Big 5 mountain bike challenge, a returning event where hundreds of riders gather during race weekend to challenge one of the most diverse and in some parts technical terrain in the big 5 mountain bike series.

In 2013, after a few years of absence, Hluhluwe was the stage of the Bell 400, the national off-road motorcycle and quad bike race, it is currently unknown if the Bell 400 will return to Hluhluwe.
