= Hlabisa Local Municipality =

Coordinates: 28°08′S 31°52′E

Hlabisa
- Local municipality
- Seal

- Location in KwaZulu-Natal
- Country: South Africa
- Province: KwaZulu-Natal
- District: uMkhanyakude
- Seat: Hlabisa
- Wards: 8

Government
  - Type: Municipal council
  - Mayor: Bhekinkosi Ntombela

Area
  - Total: 1,555 km^{2} (600 sq mi)

Population (2011)
  - Total: 71,925
  - Density: 46.25/km^{2} (119.8/sq mi)

Racial makeup (2011)
  - Black African: 99.4%
  - Coloured: 0.1%
  - Indian/Asian: 0.2%
  - White: 0.1%

First languages (2011)
  - Zulu: 95.0%
  - Southern Ndebele: 1.5%
  - English: 1.2%
  - Other: 2.3%
- Time zone: UTC+2 (SAST)
- Municipal code: KZN274

Hlabisa was an administrative area in the Umkhanyakude District of KwaZulu-Natal in South Africa. Hlabisa is an isiZulu surname of the two nkosis (kings) in the area. The municipality was situated within the vicinity of four Tribal Authorities which are the Mkhwanazi Tribal Authority, the Mdletshe Tribal Authority, and two Hlabisa Tribal Authorities.

The municipality was generally characterised by isolated rural communities with high levels of poverty. The most significant land use was subsistence agriculture and dispersed settlements, plantations and agriculture are found throughout the municipality. The major draw card of Hlabisa was the tourism industry centred on the adjacent game reserve.

After municipal elections on 3 August 2016 it was merged into the larger Big Five Hlabisa Local Municipality.

== Main places ==
The 2001 census divided the municipality into the following main places:

Place	Code	Area (km^{2})	Population
Abakwahlabisa	53501	133.62	16,583
Hlabisa	53502	1.14	652
Mdletshe	53503	375.17	38,851
Mpembeni	53504	114.83	10,490
Mpukunyoni	53505	796.90	110,299

== Politics ==
The municipal council consisted of sixteen members elected by mixed-member proportional representation. Eight councillors were elected by first-past-the-post voting in eight wards, while the remaining eight were chosen from party lists so that the total number of party representatives was proportional to the number of votes received. In the election of 18 May 2011 no party obtained a majority. The following table shows the results of the election.

The National Freedom Party lost a ward to the Inkatha Freedom Party in a by-election in December 2012. As a result, the IFP gained a majority of 9 seats on the council.

Party	Votes				Seats		
Party	Ward	List	Total	%	Ward	List	Total
IFP	8,573	8,502	17,075	46.8	6	2	8
ANC	5,052	5,076	10,128	27.8	1	3	4
NFP	4,559	4,561	9,120	25.0	1	3	4
DA	35	90	125	0.3	0	0	0
Total	18,219	18,229	36,448	100.0	8	8	16
Spoilt votes	329	318	647				
