= Hlabisa =

- Location within KwaZulu-Natal Location within South Africa
- Coordinates: 28°8′S 31°52′E
- Country: South Africa
- Province: KwaZulu-Natal
- District: Umkhanyakude
- Municipality: Big Five Hlabisa

Area
  - Total: 1.81 km^{2} (0.70 sq mi)

Population (2011)
  - Total: 2,469
  - Density: 1,360/km^{2} (3,530/sq mi)

Racial makeup (2011)
  - Black African: 96.9%
  - Coloured: 0.6%
  - Indian/Asian: 0.4%
  - White: 0.8%
  - Other: 1.3%

First languages (2011)
  - Zulu: 90.0%
  - Sign language: 3.7%
  - English: 1.9%
  - S. Ndebele: 1.0%
  - Other: 3.3%
- Time zone: UTC+2 (SAST)
- PO box: 3937
- Area code: 035

Hlabisa is a settlement in Umkhanyakude District Municipality in the KwaZulu-Natal province of South Africa. The village lies between the Hluhluwe and Umfolozi game reserves, some 40 km north-west of Mtubatuba. It is named after the Hlabisa tribe of Zulus, and also known as kwaHlabisa.

Neighbouring localities include Somkele (37 km); Nongoma (40 km); Kwamsane (43 km); Mtubatuba (47 km); Hluhluwe (48 km); Mahlabatini (50 km).

In 2007, researchers studied local healthcare habits and how long it took people in Hlabisa sub-district to go to a hospital after they had been bitten by a snake.

== Notable people ==
- Beauty Ngxongo (born 1953), is a master weaver of Zulu baskets; she lives in Hlabisa.
- Sim Tshabalala (born 1967), is a lawyer and businessman. He is the group CEO of Standard Bank Group since 2013.
- DJ Tira (born 1976; also known as Mthokozisi Khathi), DJ and producer; his birthplace and early childhood home is Hlabisa.
- King Misuzulu KaZwelithini (born 1974), King of the Zulus, and was born in Hlabisa.
- Zwelikhethabantu Ngema, father of playwright Mbongeni Ngema (1955–2023), was born in Hlabisa, and the children of the family lived there for some time.
