= Mtubatuba =

Town in KwaZulu-Natal, South Africa

- Location within KwaZulu-Natal Location within South Africa
- Coordinates: 28°25′S 32°11′E
- Country: South Africa
- Province: KwaZulu-Natal
- District: uMkhanyakude
- Municipality: Mtubatuba

Area
  - Total: 76.22 km^{2} (29.43 sq mi)

Population (2011)
  - Total: 27,237
  - Density: 357.3/km^{2} (925.5/sq mi)

Racial makeup (2011)
  - Black African: 94.5%
  - Coloured: 1.2%
  - Indian/Asian: 1.0%
  - White: 3.3%
  - Other: 0.1%

First languages (2011)
  - Zulu: 88.0%
  - English: 6.1%
  - Afrikaans: 1.7%
  - S. Ndebele: 1.5%
  - Other: 2.6%
- Time zone: UTC+2 (SAST)
- Postal code (street): 3935
- PO box: 3935
- Area code: 035

Mtubatuba is a town north of Richards Bay close to the entrance of Ncivi and the iSimangaliso Wetland Park (previously Greater St Lucia Wetland Park) but now the iSimangaliso Wetland Park is known to be under Mtuba town in KwaZulu-Natal, South Africa.

Town some 55 km south-south-west of Hluhluwe and 28 km west of St Lucia. Administered by a health committee since 1950. The name, formerly spelt Matubatuba, is Zulu for ‘creator of opportunities’, referring to a chief of the Mkwanazi tribe who died here in 1955.

The town's early years were hampered by flooding. An additional setback occurred during World War I: a ship carrying essential parts of what was to be the town's first sugar mill was torpedoed. The mill was eventually constructed in 1916 at nearby Riverview. Its township is KwaMsane.
