= Big Five Hlabisa Local Municipality =

Big Five Hlabisa
- Local municipality
- Map of KwaZulu-Natal with Big Five Hlabisa highlighted
- Country: South Africa
- Province: KwaZulu-Natal
- District: uMkhanyakude
- Seat: Hlabisa

Government
  - Type: Municipal council

Area
  - Total: 3,466 km^{2} (1,338 sq mi)

Population (2011)
  - Total: 107,183
  - Density: 30.92/km^{2} (80.09/sq mi)
- Time zone: UTC+2 (SAST)
- Municipal code: KZN276
- Website: www.big5hlabisa.gov.za/index.php/en/

Big Five Hlabisa Municipality (Zulu: UMasipala wase Big Five Hlabisa) is a local municipality within the uMkhanyakude District Municipality, in the KwaZulu-Natal province of South Africa. It was established for the August 2016 local elections by merging The Big 5 False Bay and Hlabisa local municipalities.

== Politics ==
The municipal council consists of twenty-five members elected by mixed-member proportional representation. Thirteen councillors are elected by first-past-the-post voting in thirteen wards, while the remaining twelve are chosen from party lists so that the total number of party representatives is proportional to the number of votes received.

In the election of 4 November 2026 no party obtained a majority. The Inkatha Freedom Party (IFP) received the most seats with twelve.

The following table shows the results of the election.

Party	Ward			List			Total seats
Party	Votes	%	Seats	Votes	%	Seats	Total seats
Inkatha Freedom Party	15,585	43.33	10	16,064	44.78	2	12
African National Congress	9,669	26.88	3	9,760	27.21	5	8
uMkhonto weSizwe Party	7,529	20.93	1	7,972	22.22	5	6
Independent candidates	1,542	4.29	0				0
Economic Freedom Fighters	421	1.17	0	657	1.83	1	1
11 other parties	1,225	3.41	0	1,419	3.96	0	0
Total	35,971	100.00	14	35,872	100.00	13	27
Valid votes	35,971	99.01		35,872	98.79		
Invalid/blank votes	360	0.99		438	1.21		
Total votes	36,331	100.00		36,310	100.00		
Registered voters/turnout	63,355	57.35		63,355	57.31		
