= Hluhluwe–Imfolozi Park =

Nature reserve in KwaZulu-Natal, South Africa

Hluhluwe–iMfolozi Park
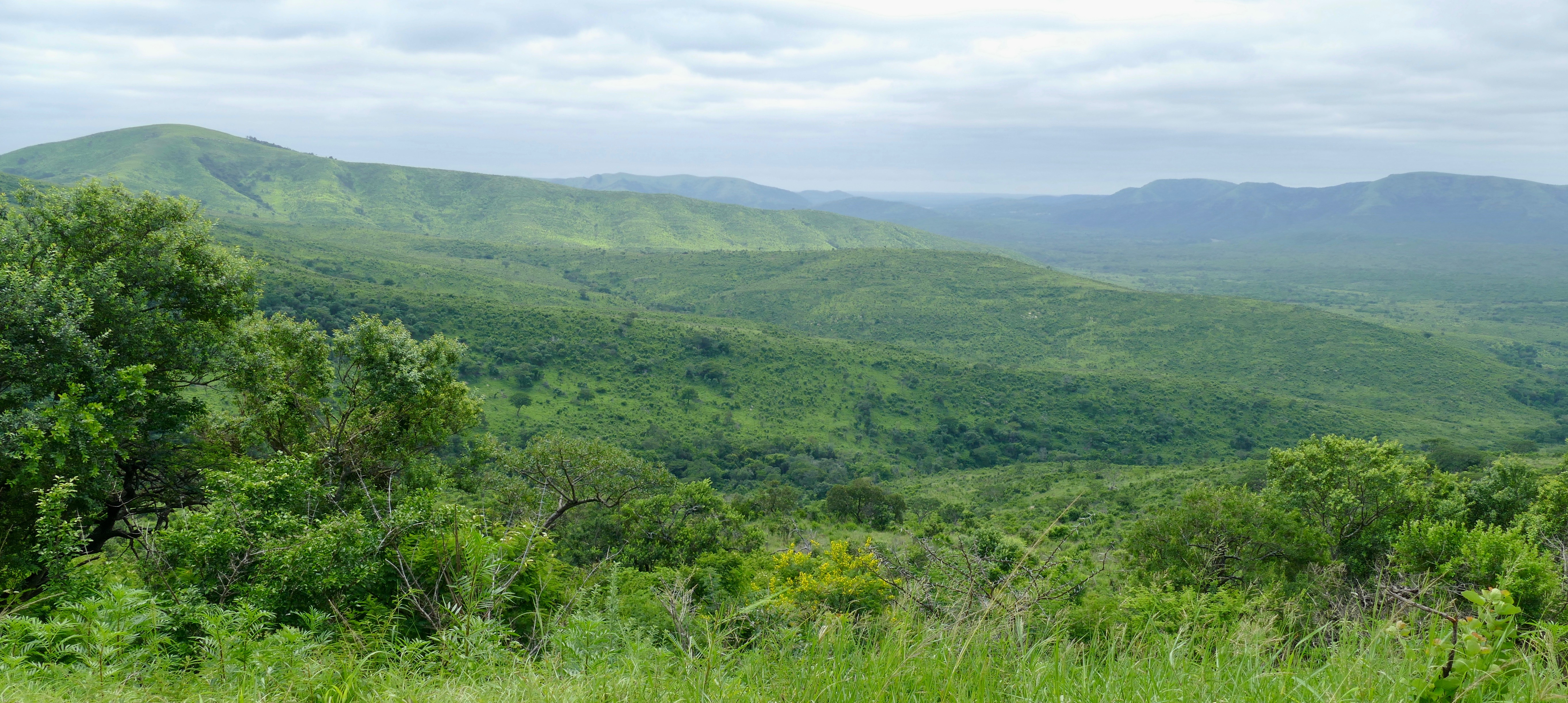
- Hluhluwe–iMfolozi Park
- Location: KwaZulu-Natal, South Africa
- Nearest city: Durban, South Africa
- Coordinates: 28°13′11″S 31°57′7″E
- Area: 960 km^{2} (370 sq mi)
- Established: 30 April 1895; 131 years ago
- Governing body: Ezemvelo KZN Wildlife
- Hluhluwe–Imfolozi Park (South Africa) Hluhluwe–Imfolozi Park (KwaZulu-Natal)

Hluhluwe–Imfolozi Park, formerly Hluhluwe–Umfolozi Game Reserve, is a nature reserve in central KwaZulu-Natal, South Africa. It consists of 960 km^{2} (370 sq mi) of hilly topography and is the oldest reserve in Africa. Operated by Ezemvelo KZN Wildlife, the park is the only state-run park in KwaZulu-Natal where each of the big five game animals occur.

Hluhluwe–Imfolozi Park has one of the largest populations of southern white rhinoceros in the world. However, this population remains severely threatened by poaching.

== History ==
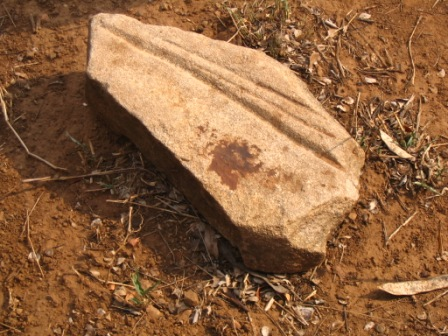
A rock originally used by Zulu hunters for sharpening spears

Throughout the park there are many signs of stone age settlements and iron smelting sites. The area is claimed to have been declared a royal hunting ground for the Zulu kingdom in the time of Shaka.

The southern white rhino, first identified by Western naturalist William John Burchell in 1812, was virtually eliminated during the 19th century by European hunters, and by 1895 was believed to be extinct. A population of between 20 and 100 was identified in South Africa and preserved by establishing the Umfolozi Junction Reserve and Hluhluwe Reserve, which are now parts of the Hluhluwe–Imfolozi Park.

Historically, tsetse flies carrying the nagana disease protected the area from colonial hunters. Later, as the Zululand area was settled by white farmers, wildlife in the reserves was blamed for the prevalence of the tsetse fly, and the reserves became experimental areas in the efforts to eradicate the fly. Farmers called for the slaughter of game and over 100,000 animals were killed in the reserves between 1919 and 1950, although the rhino population was spared. The introduction of DDT spraying in 1945 virtually eliminated the tsetse fly from the reserves, although subsequent outbreaks have occurred.

By the 1950s the white rhino population of the reserve had recovered to around 400, and the park's warden, Ian Player, established Operation Rhino in the 1950s and 60s, with the park's Rhino Capture Unit relocating hundreds of rhinos to establish populations in other reserves across their historic range.

In 1989, the corridor between the Hluhluwe and Imfolozi reserves was added in order to join the separate reserves into the current single park.

== Geography and climate ==
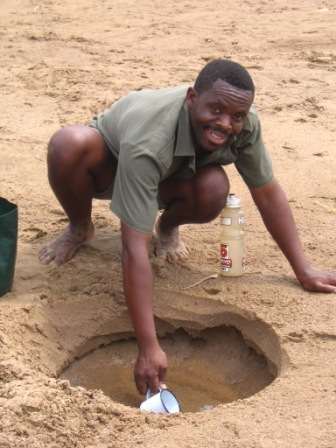
A park guide digging for water in the Black Umfolozi River

The park is located in the province of KwaZulu-Natal on the east coast of South Africa. The park is closest to the town of Mtubatuba and the villages of Hluhluwe and Hlabisa. The geography of the area differs from the north, or Hluhluwe area, to the south, or Umfolozi area. Hluhluwe–Imfolozi Park is partly in a low-risk malaria area.

=== Umfolozi ===
This area is situated between the two Umfolozi Rivers where they divide into the Mfolozi emnyama ('Black Umfolozi') to the north and the Mfolozi emhlophe ('White Umfolozi') to the south. This area is to the south of the park and is generally hot in summer, and mild to cool in winter, although cold spells do occur.

=== Hluhluwe ===
The north of the park is more rugged and mountainous with forests and grasslands and is known as the Hluhluwe area, while the Umfolozi area is found to the south near the Black and White Umfolozi rivers where there is open savanna.

== Biodiversity ==
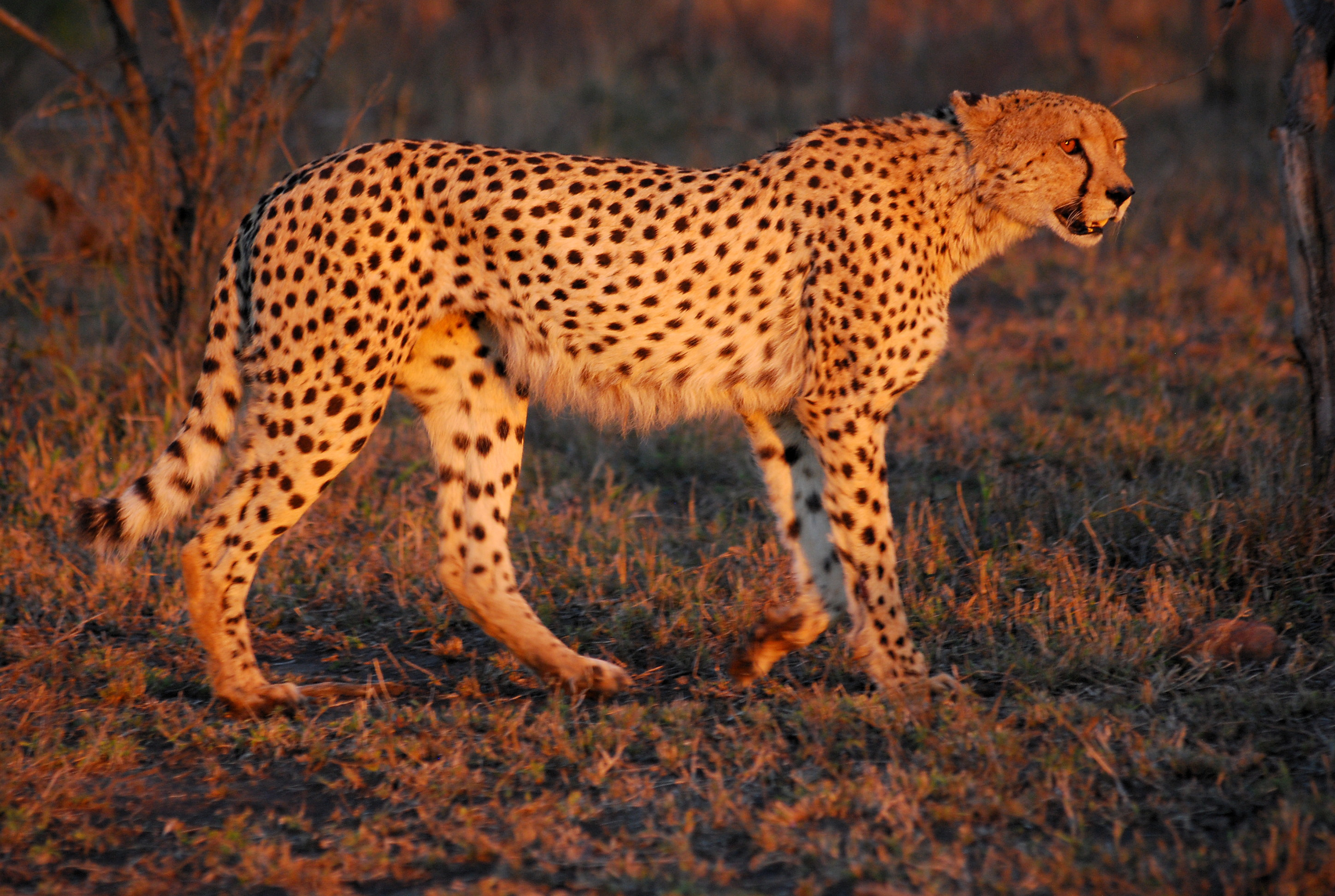
A South African cheetah during the sunset at Hluhluwe–Imfolozi Park.

=== Fauna ===
The park is home to Africa's big five game: African bush elephant, south-central black rhinoceros and southern white rhinoceros, African buffalo, lion and African leopard. It is home to 86 species including: Nile crocodile, hippopotamus, south African cheetah, spotted hyena, blue wildebeest, jackal, South African giraffe, Burchell's zebra, waterbuck, nyala, common eland, greater kudu, impala, duiker, suni, reedbuck, common warthog, bushpig, mongoose, baboon, monkeys, a variety of tortoises, terrapins, snakes and lizards.

It is one of the world's top spots for viewing nyala. The park is a prime birding destination and is home to 340 bird species. The Hluhluwe River floodplain is one of the few areas in South Africa where yellow-throated longclaw, rosy-throated longclaw and Cape longclaw co-occur. Birdlife include black-crowned night heron,Wahlberg's eagle, Shelley's francolin, black-bellied bustard, Temminck's courser, Klaas's cuckoo, little bee-eater and crested barbet.

=== Flora ===
The park has a diverse floral community.

== Conservation efforts ==
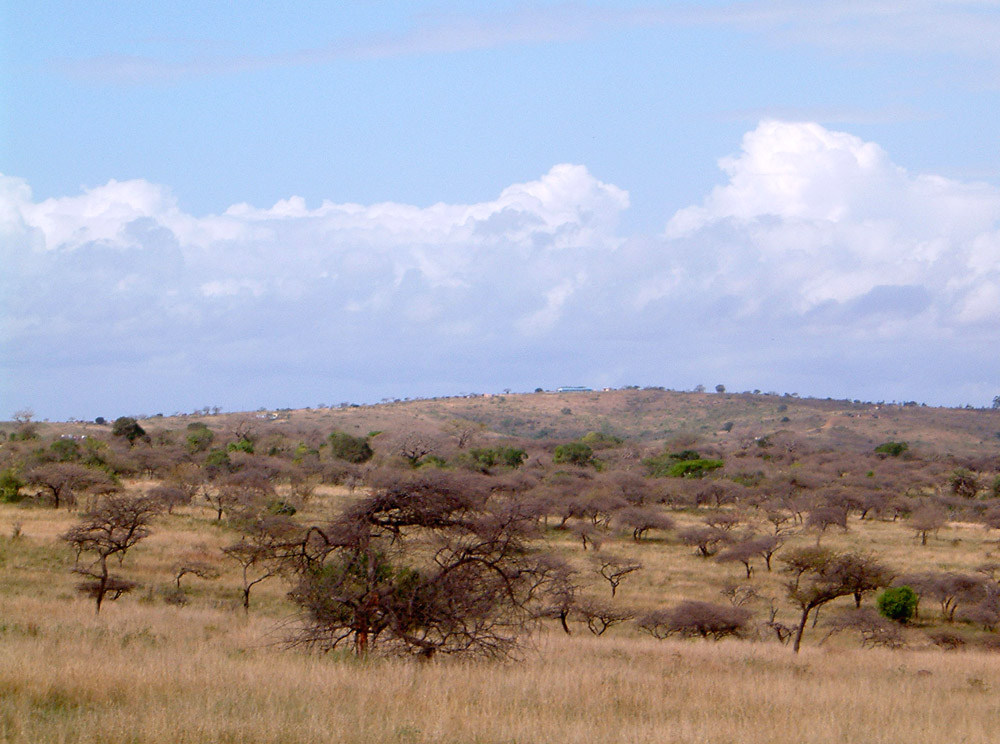
Typical landscape in the park

=== Rhinoceros ===
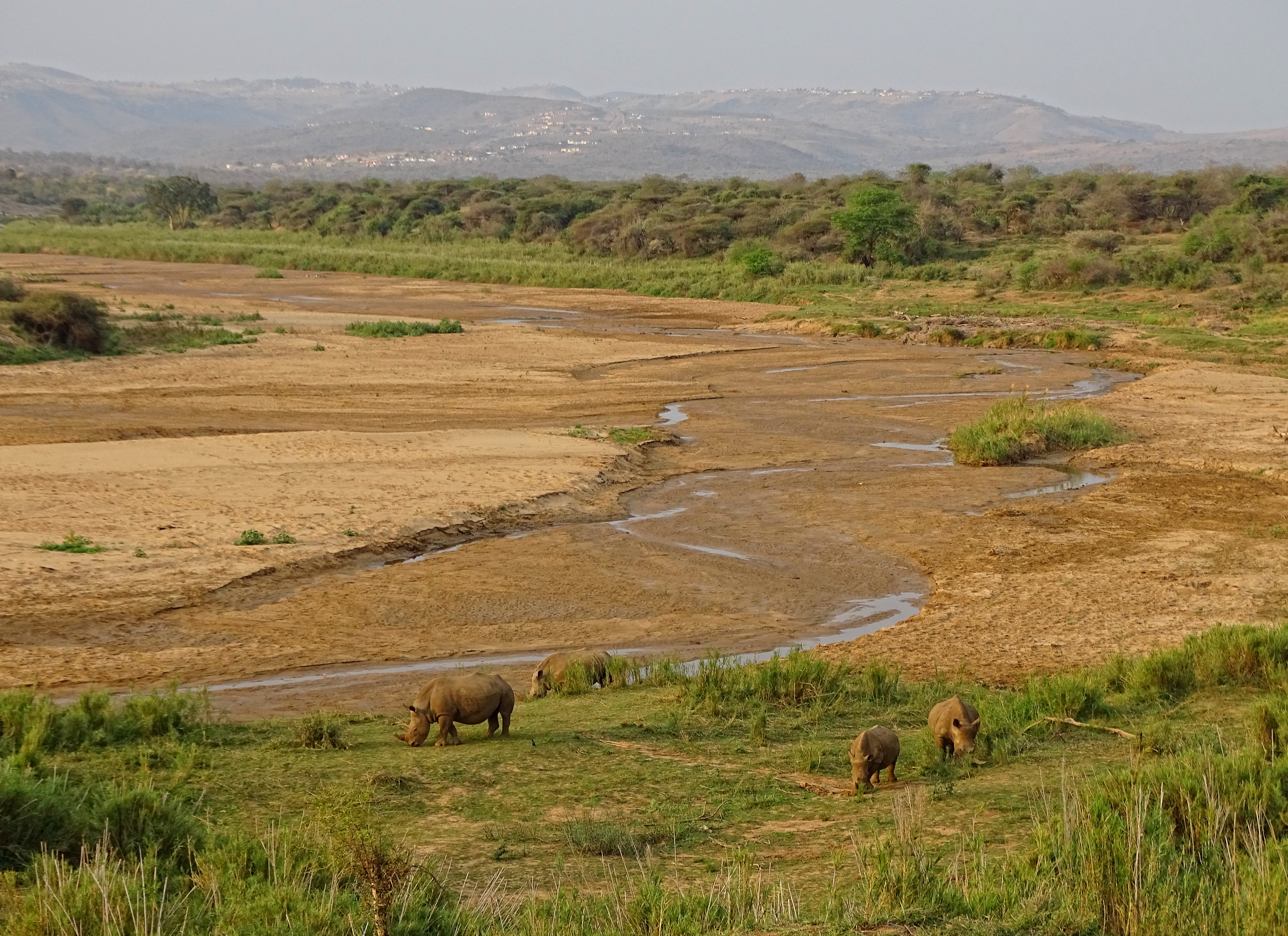
Rhinos grazing in the Park

The park is the birthplace of rhino preservation, having been responsible for breeding the southern white rhinoceros back from near extinction in the first half of the 20th century. There are reportedly 1,600 white rhino in the reserve.

The rhino population remains severely threatened by poaching, with 222 rhinos poached in the province in 2017, most of them in the park. Hluhluwe–Imfolozi has implemented Smart Park which facilitates the integration of systems, including drone technology, for early detection and rapid response of reaction units. On 6 March 2020 two of three suspected rhino poachers were killed in a shootout after they were detected by infrared cameras. In 2022, 244 rhinos were poached in the province, 228 of them in the park. In 2023, the reserve was the worst hit in South Africa; The Minister of Environment, Forestry and Fisheries, Barbara Creecy, said "We have to be concerned that almost every single day this year a rhino has been killed in Hluhluwe Imfolozi."

=== African wild dog ===
In 1981, the Natal Parks board (now Ezemvelo KZN Wildlife) attempted to reintroduce African wild dogs into the park. Twenty-three dogs were released in the reserve, most of which had been bred in zoos. However this met with limited success and by 2015, the population had fluctuated between 3 and 30 individuals. Further dogs were released into the park in 2022.

== Facilities ==
The first visitor camp was built at Hilltop in 1934, and is now the main camp in the northern (Hluhluwe) section of the park. The main camp in the southern (Umfolozi) section is Mpila. The reserve has a 300-kilometre (190 mi) road network.

== Impact of coal mining ==
The park ecosystems are threatened by the proximity of coal mines, with ongoing applications for prospecting and mine expansions on the western and southern edges of the park.

== See also ==
- Hluhluwe creeper
- Protected areas of South Africa
- South African National Parks
