= Mdletshe =

Mdletshe is a South African surname. Notable people with the surname include:

- Anthony Mdletshe, South African Anglican bishop
- Bonga Mdletshe (1955–2024), South African politician
- Canaan Mdletshe (1976/77–2024), South African journalist and politician
