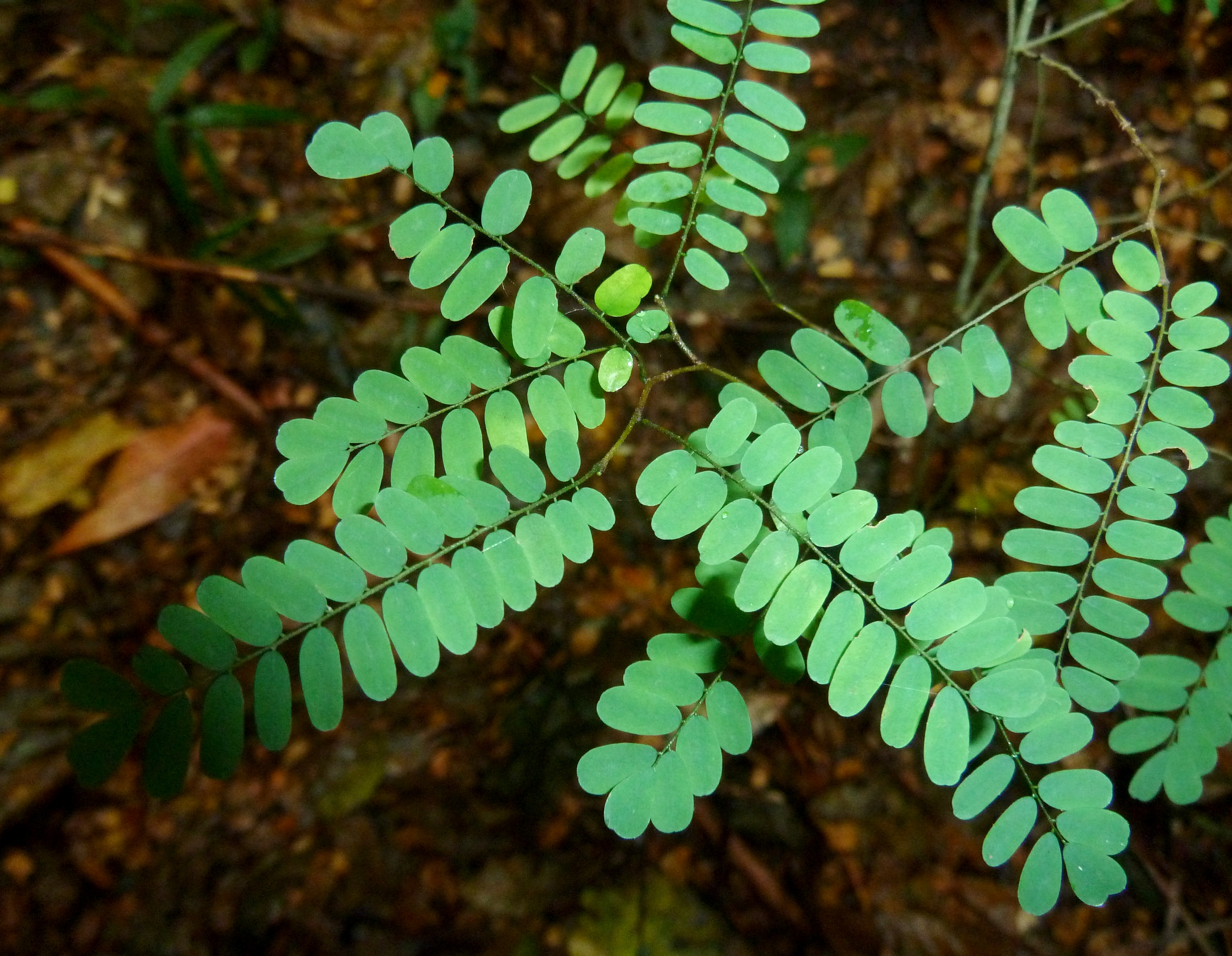

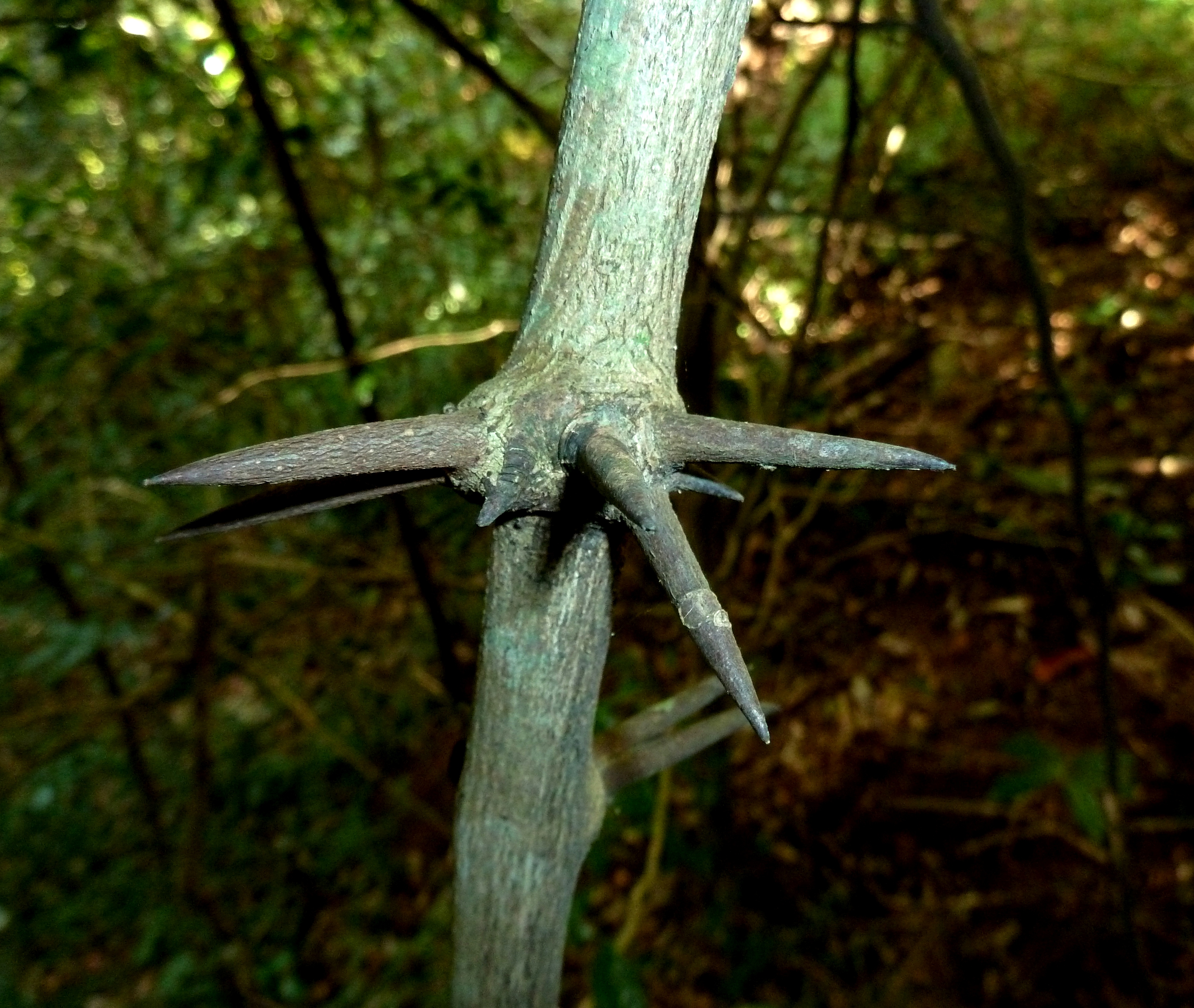

Conservation status
- Least Concern (IUCN 3.1)

Scientific classification
- Kingdom: Plantae
- Clade: Embryophytes
- Clade: Tracheophytes
- Clade: Angiosperms
- Clade: Eudicots
- Clade: Rosids
- Order: Fabales
- Family: Fabaceae
- Subfamily: Faboideae
- Genus: Dalbergia
- Species: D. armata

Binomial name
- Dalbergia armata E.Mey.

Synonyms
- Homotypic Synonyms: Amerimnon armatum (E.Mey.) Kuntze; Heterotypic Synonyms: Dalbergia myriantha Meisn.

= Dalbergia armata =

Hluhluwe creeper

Species of legume

Dalbergia armata is a species of flowering plant in the legume family, Fabaceae.. It is sometimes referred to by the common names Thorny Rope, Hluhluwe creeper or Hluhluwe Creeper. It is a scrambling, deciduous plant that is native to subtropical to temperate regions of southeastern Africa. The robust, woody liana or small tree is armed with strong spines on the main stem and branches. It occurs sparsely or commonly in forest, bush, riparian fringes and in wooded ravines. It is sometimes employed as a bonsai subject, and it can be propagated from either seed or cuttings.

== Range ==
It occurs widely in coastal, montane or riparian forests of southern Tanzania, Mozambique, Eswatini and eastern South Africa. In South Africa it is present in the Eastern Cape, KwaZulu-Natal, Mpumalanga and Limpopo provinces. The Hluhluwe River is named after this species, due to its prevalence on the banks of the river. The species is virtually confined to White’s Tongaland-Pondoland centre of endemism.

== Description ==
Their thick (up to 15 cm) and 10 to 30 m long ropes have sturdy, sideways-directed spines which may grow in clusters, and encircle the stems. The spines which are up to 10 cm long, hook onto adjacent vegetation to direct the plant towards the canopy. The bark is dark greyish brown.

The alternate leaves are up to 8 cm long, finely compound and are bluish green on their upper surfaces. The 21 to 41 oblong leaflets (i.e. 10 to 20 pairs plus terminal) have a sub-opposite or alternate arrangement. The leaflets close in overcast weather, and the foliage is popular with browsing animals.

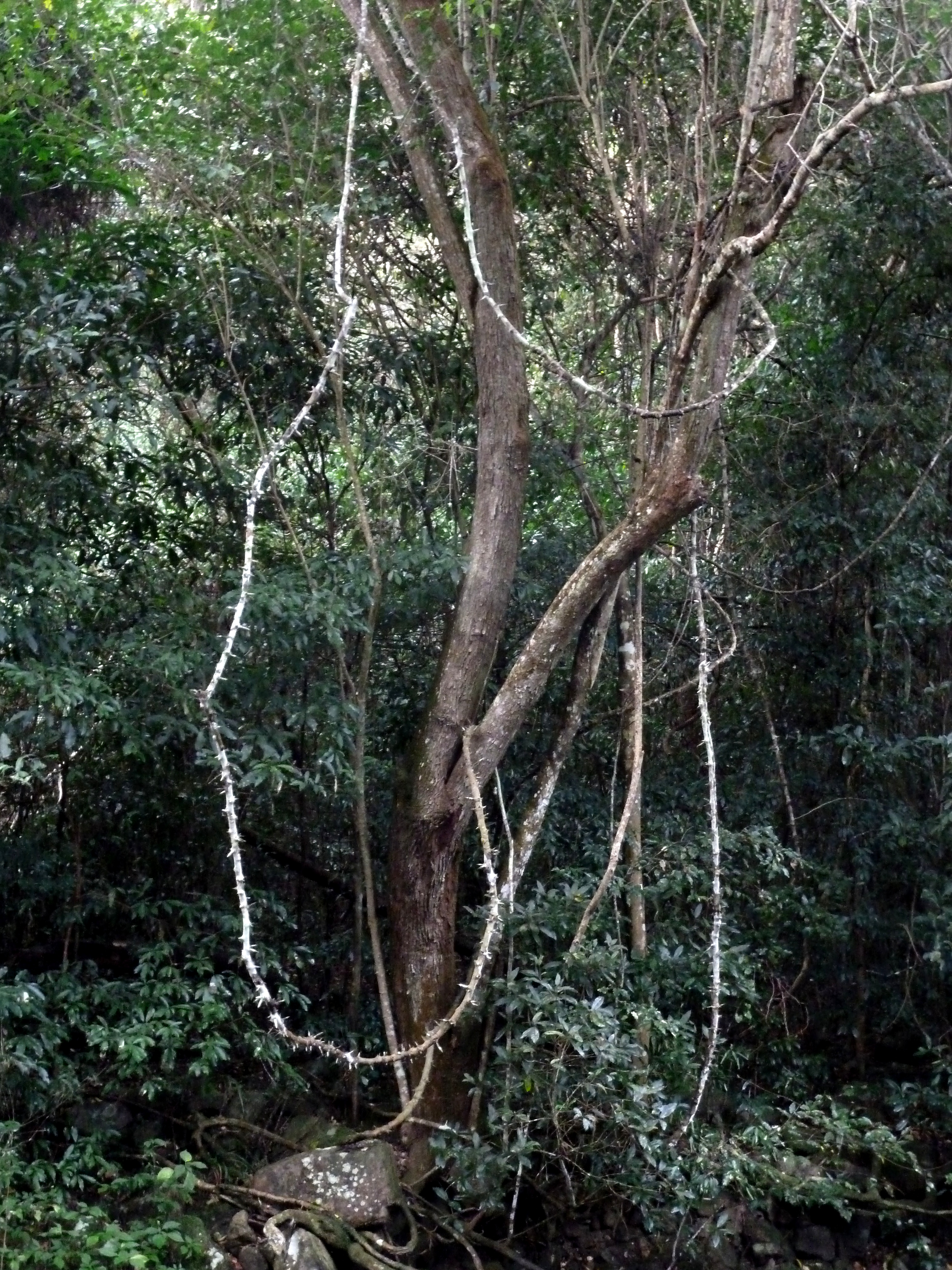
Draped over a forest tree

Their very small, sweetly scented flowers are creamy-white in colour. They appear in early summer, and are born in dense terminal or axillary clusters. The small and thin seed pods measure about 5 by 2 cm. They are papery in texture and lemon-yellow to pale brown in colour. The indehiscent fruit which hold 1 to 3 seeds each, are often produced in profusion. They appear in clusters on horizontal branch tips, from late summer.

== Similar species ==
The zebra-wood is also armed and has an overlapping range, but its leaflets are fewer (7 to 13) and larger, while its flowers vary from white to pink. Other Dalbergia species of the region have hairy pods, or velvety undersides to the leaflets. The thorny elm has simple leaves.
