= Inkosi uMtubatuba Local Municipality =

Coordinates: 28°25′S 32°11′E

Mtubatuba
- Local municipality
- Seal

- Location in KwaZulu-Natal
- Country: South Africa
- Province: KwaZulu-Natal
- District: uMkhanyakude
- Seat: Mtubatuba
- Wards: 23

Government
  - Type: Municipal council
  - Mayor: Mxolisi Mthethwa (IFP)

Area
  - Total: 1,738 km^{2} (671 sq mi)

Population (2011)
  - Total: 175,425
  - Density: 100.9/km^{2} (261.4/sq mi)

Racial makeup (2011)
  - Black African: 98.1%
  - Coloured: 0.4%
  - Indian/Asian: 0.3%
  - White: 1.1%

First languages (2011)
  - Zulu: 93.1%
  - English: 2.9%
  - Southern Ndebele: 1.3%
  - Other: 2.7%
- Time zone: UTC+2 (SAST)
- Municipal code: KZN275

Inkosi uMtubatuba Municipality, previously named the Mtubatuba Municipality (Zulu: UMasipala wase Mtubatuba) is a local municipality within the Umkhanyakude District Municipality, in the KwaZulu-Natal province of South Africa. It is named after one of the longest serving Zulu chiefs, Nkosi Mtubatuba (1855-1955).

== Main places ==
The 2001 census divided the municipality into the following main places:

Place	Code	Area (km^{2})	Population
Dukuduku State Forest	53602	155.88	132
Dukuduku	53601	3.51	6,364
Honeydale	53603	0.62	788
Mpukunyoni	53604	9.66	10,647
Msane	53605	1.40	5,233
Mtubatuba	53612	4.67	2,020
Nyalazi State Forest	53607	221.22	424
Sokhulu	53608	36.91	6,450
St Lucia Estuary	53610	18.85	134
St Lucia	53609	2.82	864
Umfolozi	53611	36.47	0
Remainder of the municipality	53606	211.47	2,136

== Politics ==
The municipal council consists of forty-five members elected by mixed-member proportional representation. Twenty-three councillors are elected by first-past-the-post voting in twenty-three wards, while the remaining twenty-two are chosen from party lists so that the total number of party representatives is proportional to the number of votes received.

In the election of 4 November 2026 no party obtained a majority. The Inkatha Freedom Party (IFP) received the most seats with eighteen.

The following table shows the results of the election.

Party	Ward			List			Total seats
Party	Votes	%	Seats	Votes	%	Seats	Total seats
Inkatha Freedom Party	23,446	37.69	18	24,082	38.79	0	18
uMkhonto weSizwe Party	12,926	20.78	2	13,693	22.05	8	10
African National Congress	12,621	20.29	2	12,620	20.33	7	9
Economic Freedom Fighters	2,497	4.01	1	2,422	3.90	1	2
Siyanqoba Independent Party	2,350	3.78	0	2,039	3.28	2	2
Democratic Alliance	1,245	2.00	0	1,315	2.12	1	1
African Economic Freedom	1,263	2.03	0	1,237	1.99	1	1
National Peoples Ambassadors	611	0.98	0	570	0.92	1	1
National Community Liberation	601	0.97	0	525	0.85	1	1
Independent candidates	1,053	1.69	0				0
19 other parties	3,600	5.79	0	3,583	5.77	0	0
Total	62,213	100.00	23	62,086	100.00	22	45
Valid votes	62,213	98.59		62,086	98.64		
Invalid/blank votes	892	1.41		855	1.36		
Total votes	63,105	100.00		62,941	100.00		
Registered voters/turnout	112,457	56.11		112,457	55.97		
