= Umkhanyakude District Municipality =

Coordinates: 27°37′S 32°02′E

uMkhanyakude North Uthungulu
- District municipality
- Seal

- Location in South Africa
- Country: South Africa
- Province: KwaZulu-Natal
- Seat: Mkuze
- Local municipalities: List: uMhlabuyalingana; Jozini; Big Five False Bay; Hlabisa; Mtubatuba

Government
  - Type: Municipal council
  - Mayor: Cllr.Solomon Mkhombo

Area
  - Total: 12,821 km^{2} (4,950 sq mi)

Population (2011)
  - Total: 625,846
  - Density: 48.814/km^{2} (126.43/sq mi)

Racial makeup (2011)
  - Black African: 98.8%
  - Coloured: 0.2%
  - Indian/Asian: 0.2%
  - White: 0.7%

First languages (2011)
  - Zulu: 94.6%
  - English: 1.7%
  - Southern Ndebele: 1.2%
  - Other: 2.5%
- Time zone: UTC+2 (SAST)
- Municipal code: DC27

The uMkhanyakude District Municipality (Zulu: UMasipala wesiFunda sase uMkhanyakude) is the northernmost of the 11 districts of the KwaZulu-Natal province of South Africa. Its seat is Mkuze. It is a very rural district, the largest town being Mtubatuba in the south, with Hluhluwe, Mkuze, Jozini, Kwangwanase and Ingwavuma further to the north. The majority of its 573,353 inhabitants spoke isiZulu as of 2001.

== Controversies ==
Umkhanyakude municipality lost R255 million Rands in unspent for infrastructure.

== Geography ==
=== Neighbours ===
uMkhanyakude is surrounded by:

- The republic of Mozambique to the north
- The Indian Ocean to the east
- King Cetswayo to the south (DC28)
- Zululand to the west (DC26)
- the kingdom of Eswatini to the north-west

=== Local municipalities ===
The district contains the following local municipalities:

Local municipality	Population	%	Dominant language
Jozini	184 093	32.11%	Zulu
Hlabisa	176 899	30.85%	Zulu
Umhlabuyalingana	140 962	24.59%	Zulu
Mtubatuba	35 216	6.14%	Zulu
The Big 5 False Bay	31 102	5.42%	Zulu
St Lucia Park	5 080	0.89%	

== Demographics ==
The following statistics are from the 2001 census.

Language	Population	%
IsiZulu	559 949	97.66%
SiSwati	3 748	0.65%
English	3 182	0.55%
Afrikaans	2 304	0.40%
IsiNdebele	1 378	0.24%
Sesotho	903	0.16%
Sepedi	582	0.10%
IsiXhosa	561	0.10%
Setswana	259	0.05%
Xitsonga	230	0.04%
Other	208	0.04%
Tshivenda	48	0.01%

=== Gender ===
Gender	Population	%
Female	313 954	54.76%
Male	259 399	45.24%

=== Ethnic group ===
Ethnic group	Population	%
Black African	568 853	99.22%
White	3 235	0.56%
Coloured	898	0.16%
Indian/Asian	367	0.06%

=== Age ===
Age	Population	%
000 - 004	76 956	13.42%
005 - 009	85 375	14.89%
010 - 014	86 948	15.16%
015 - 019	78 248	13.65%
020 - 024	50 006	8.72%
025 - 029	36 983	6.45%
030 - 034	30 883	5.39%
035 - 039	27 382	4.78%
040 - 044	23 084	4.03%
045 - 049	16 695	2.91%
050 - 054	13 481	2.35%
055 - 059	9 654	1.68%
060 - 064	11 199	1.95%
065 - 069	8 543	1.49%
070 - 074	8 869	1.55%
075 - 079	4 049	0.71%
080 - 084	3 017	0.53%
085 - 089	1 004	0.18%
090 - 094	579	0.10%
095 - 099	292	0.05%
100 plus	106	0.02%

== Politics ==
=== Election results ===
Election results for Umkhanyakude in the South African general election, 2004.

- Population 18 and over: 274 753 [47.92% of total population]
- Total votes: 150 543 [26.26% of total population]
- Voting % estimate: 54.79% votes as a % of population 18 and over

Party	Votes	%
Inkhata Freedom Party	104 721	69.56%
African National Congress	36 893	24.51%
Democratic Alliance	3 357	2.23%
African Christian Democratic Party	1 381	0.92%
United Democratic Movement	1 038	0.69%
Azanian People's Organisation	423	0.28%
New National Party	374	0.25%
Freedom Front Plus	343	0.23%
Independent Democrats	308	0.20%
Pan African Congress	234	0.16%
PJC	204	0.14%
SOPA	177	0.12%
KISS	176	0.12%
CDP	163	0.11%
United Christian Democratic Party	139	0.09%
EMSA	135	0.09%
UF	113	0.08%
Minority Front	112	0.07%
TOP	106	0.07%
NA	91	0.06%
NLP	55	0.04%
Total	150 543	100.00%
