= KwaZulu-Natal =

KwaZulu-Natal iKwaZulu-Natali (Zulu)
- Province
- Province of KwaZulu-Natal
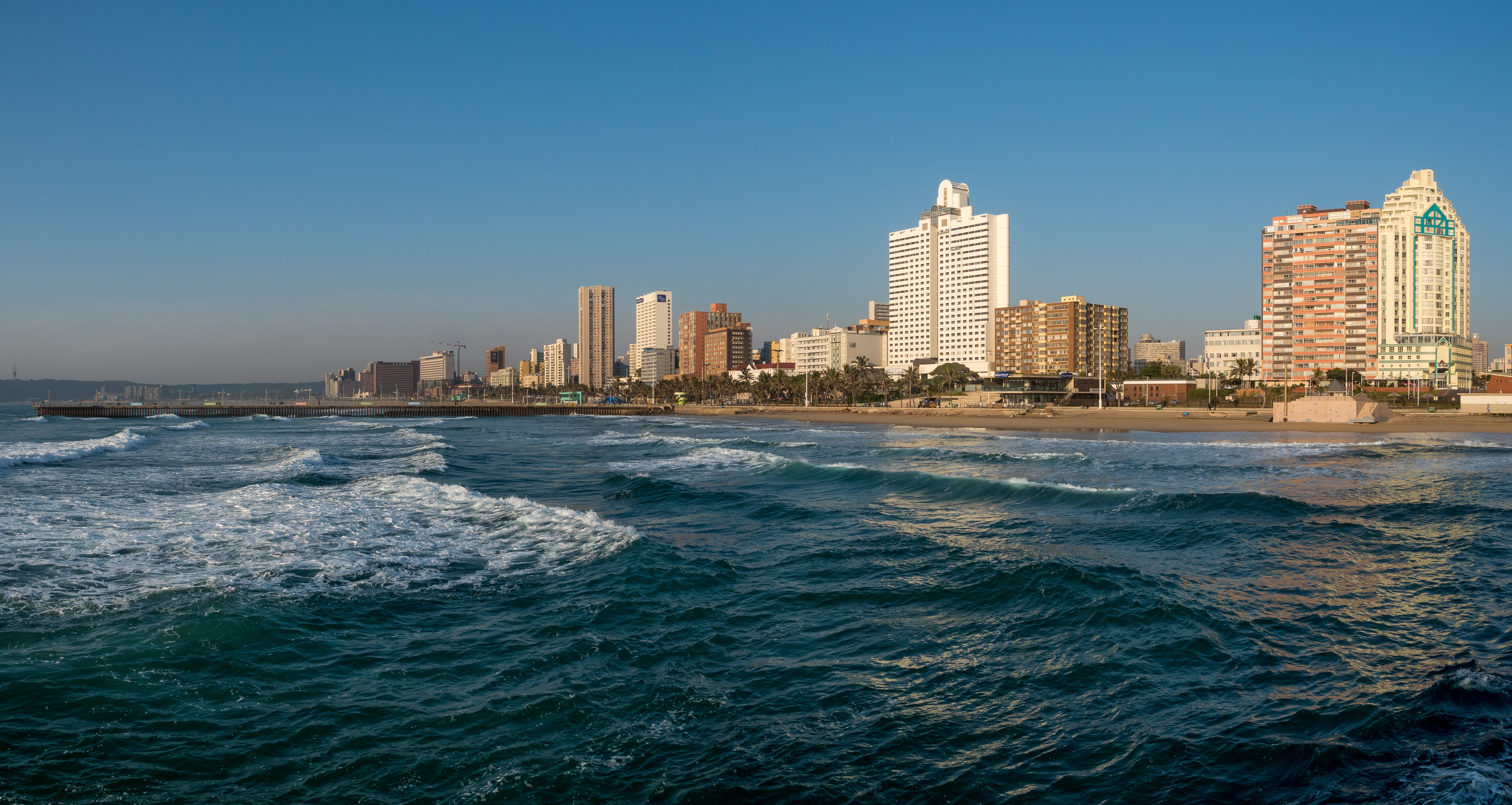
- South Beach in Durban, the most populous city in KwaZulu-Natal

- Coat of arms
- Nickname: The Garden Province
- Mottoes: Masisukume sakhe; ("Let us rise and build")
- Location of KwaZulu-Natal in South Africa
- Country: South Africa
- Established: 27 April 1994
- Capital: Pietermaritzburg
- Largest city: Durban
- Districts: List: eThekwini; Ugu; Umgungundlovu; Uthukela; Umzinyathi; Amajuba; Zululand; Umkhanyakude; King Cetshwayo; iLembe; Harry Gwala

Government
  - Type: Parliamentary constitutional monarchy
  - Premier: Thami Ntuli (IFP)
  - Legislature: KwaZulu-Natal Legislature

Area
  - Total: 94,361 km^{2} (36,433 sq mi)
  - Rank: 7th in South Africa
- Highest elevation: 3,451 m (11,322 ft)
- Lowest elevation: 0 m (0 ft)

Population (2023)
  - Total: 13,719,484
  - Rank: 2nd in South Africa
  - Density: 133/km^{2} (340/sq mi)
  - Rank: 2nd in South Africa

Population groups (2023)
  - Black: 84.8%
  - Indian or Asian: 9.2%
  - White: 4.2%
  - Coloured: 1.1%
  - Other: 0.5%

Languages (2023)
  - IsiZulu: 80.0%
  - English: 16.2%
  - Xhosa: 3.1%
  - Afrikaans: 1.0%
- Time zone: UTC+2 (SAST)
- ISO 3166 code: ZA-KZN
- HDI (2021): 0.710 high · 5th of 9
- GDP: US$64.7 billion
- Website: www.kznonline.gov.za

KwaZulu-Natal
- Zulu: iKwaZulu-Natali
- Xhosa: iKwaZulu-Nataliya
- Afrikaans: KuaZoeloe-Natal
- Sepedi: BoSulu-Natala
- Swazi: eKwaZulu-Natali
- Sesotho: LeSulu-Natalea
- Setswana: BoSulu-Natali
- Xitsonga: KaZulu-Natala
- Venda: BuZhulu-Natala
- Southern Ndebele: iKwaZulu-Natala
- Khoekhoe: ǁHuǁnauna!hub

KwaZulu-Natal (/kwɑːˌzuːluː nəˈtɑːl/, also referred to as KZN) is a province of South Africa that was created in 1994 when the government merged the Zulu bantustan of KwaZulu ("Place of the Zulu" in Zulu) and Natal Province.

It is located in the southeast of the country, with a long shoreline on the Indian Ocean. It shares borders with three other provinces and the countries of Mozambique, Eswatini and Lesotho. Its capital is Pietermaritzburg, and its largest city is Durban, which is also the city with the largest port in sub-Saharan Africa. It is the second-most populous province in South Africa, after Gauteng.

Two areas in KwaZulu-Natal have been declared UNESCO World Heritage Sites: the iSimangaliso Wetland Park and the uKhahlamba Drakensberg Park. These areas are important to the surrounding ecosystems.

During the 1830s and early 1840s, the northern part of what is now KwaZulu-Natal was established as the Zulu Kingdom. The southern part was, briefly, the Boer Natalia Republic before the British took over control in 1843, renaming it as the Colony of Natal in 1843. The Zulu Kingdom remained independent until 1879.

KwaZulu-Natal is the birthplace of many notable figures in South Africa's history, such as Albert Luthuli, the first non-white and the first person from outside Europe and the Americas to be awarded the Nobel Peace Prize (1960); Pixley ka Isaka Seme, the founder of the African National Congress (ANC) and South Africa's first black lawyer; John Langalibalele Dube, the ANC's founding president; Harry Gwala, ANC member and anti-apartheid activist; Mac Maharaj, ANC member, anti-apartheid activist and Little Rivonia Trial defendant; Grammy award-winning group Ladysmith Black Mambazo; Grammy award-winning DJ Black Coffee, South African Radio Hall of Fame inductee Alan Khan; Sociologist and author Fatima Meer; Mangosuthu Buthelezi, the founder of the Inkatha Freedom Party (IFP); Anton Lembede, the founding president of the ANC Youth League; Jacob Zuma, the former President of South Africa; Bhambatha, a 19th-century Zulu chief who became an anti-apartheid icon; and Shaka Zulu.

== Geography ==
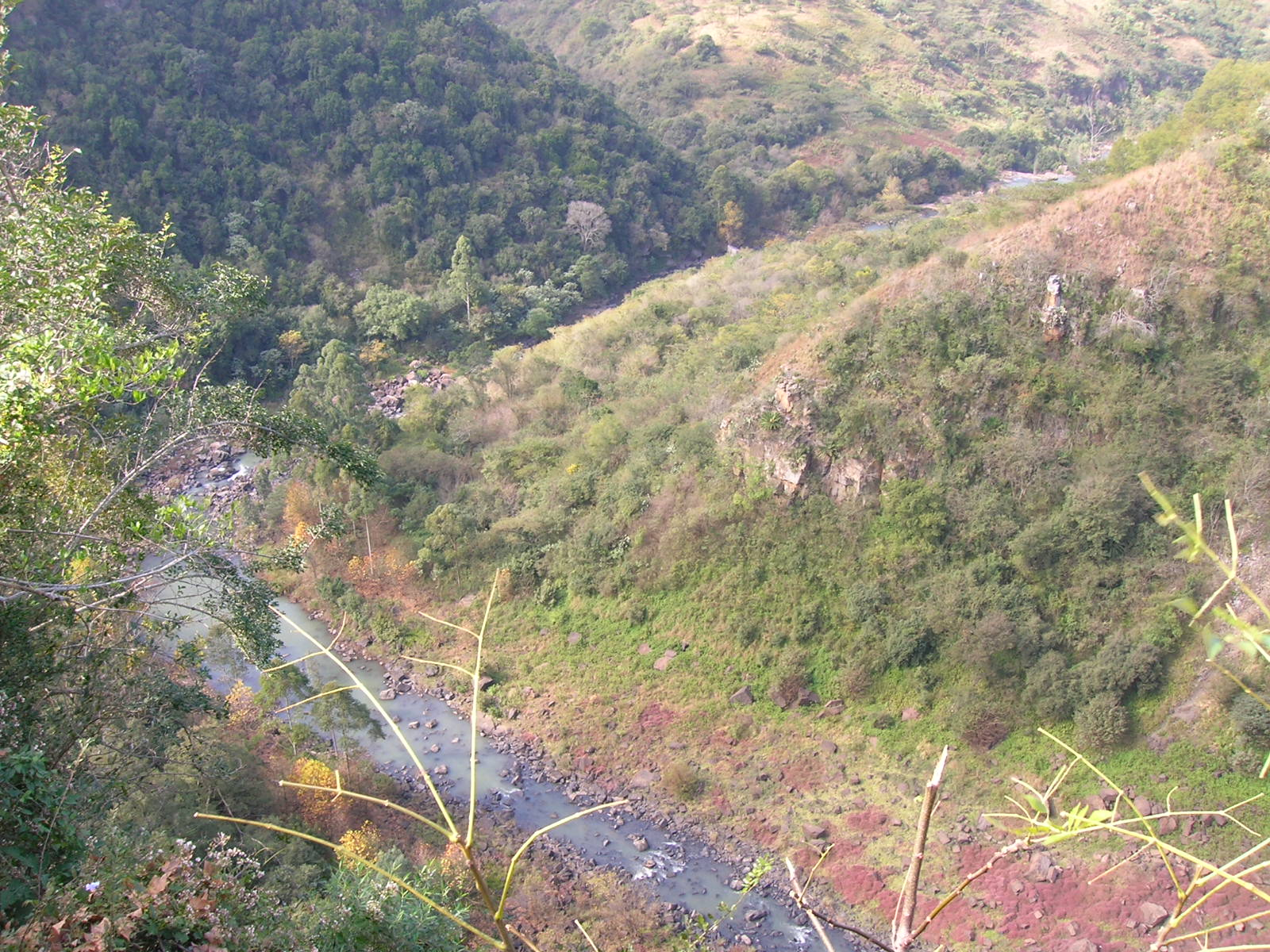
The Mngeni River valley near Howick Falls

At around 92,100 km^{2} (35,600 sq mi) in area, KwaZulu-Natal is roughly the size of Portugal. It has three different geographic areas and is the eastern most province in the country. The lowland region along the Indian Ocean coast is extremely narrow in the south, widening in the northern part of the province, while the central Natal Midlands consists of an undulating hilly plateau rising toward the west. Two mountainous areas, the western Drakensberg Mountains and northern Lebombo Mountains form, respectively, a solid basalt wall rising over 3,000 m (9,800 ft) beside Lesotho border and low parallel ranges of ancient granite running southward from Eswatini. The area's largest river, the Tugela, flows west to east across the center of the province.

The coastal regions typically have subtropical thickets and deeper ravines; steep slopes host some Afromontane Forest. The midlands have moist grasslands and isolated pockets of Afromontane Forest. The north has a primarily moist savanna habitat, whilst the Drakensberg region hosts mostly alpine grassland.

The province contains rich areas of biodiversity of a range of flora and fauna. The iSimangaliso Wetland Park and the uKhahlamba-Drakensberg Park have been declared UNESCO World Heritage Sites. The iSimangaliso Wetland Park, along with uKhahlamba Drakensberg Park and Ndumo, are wetlands of international importance for migratory species and are designated as Ramsar sites. South Africa signed the 1971 Ramsar Convention to try to conserve and protect important wetlands because of their importance to habitats and numerous species.

The former Eastern Cape enclave of the town of Umzimkulu and its hinterland have been incorporated into KwaZulu-Natal following the 12th amendment of the Constitution of South Africa. The amendment also made other changes to the southern border of the province.

The northwesterly line of equal latitude and longitude traverses the province from the coast at Hibberdene (30°34′35″S 30°34′35″E) to northeast Lesotho.

The province became the first to include a portion of road that is made of partial plastic, the equivalent of nearly 40,000 recycled milk cartons.

=== Climate ===
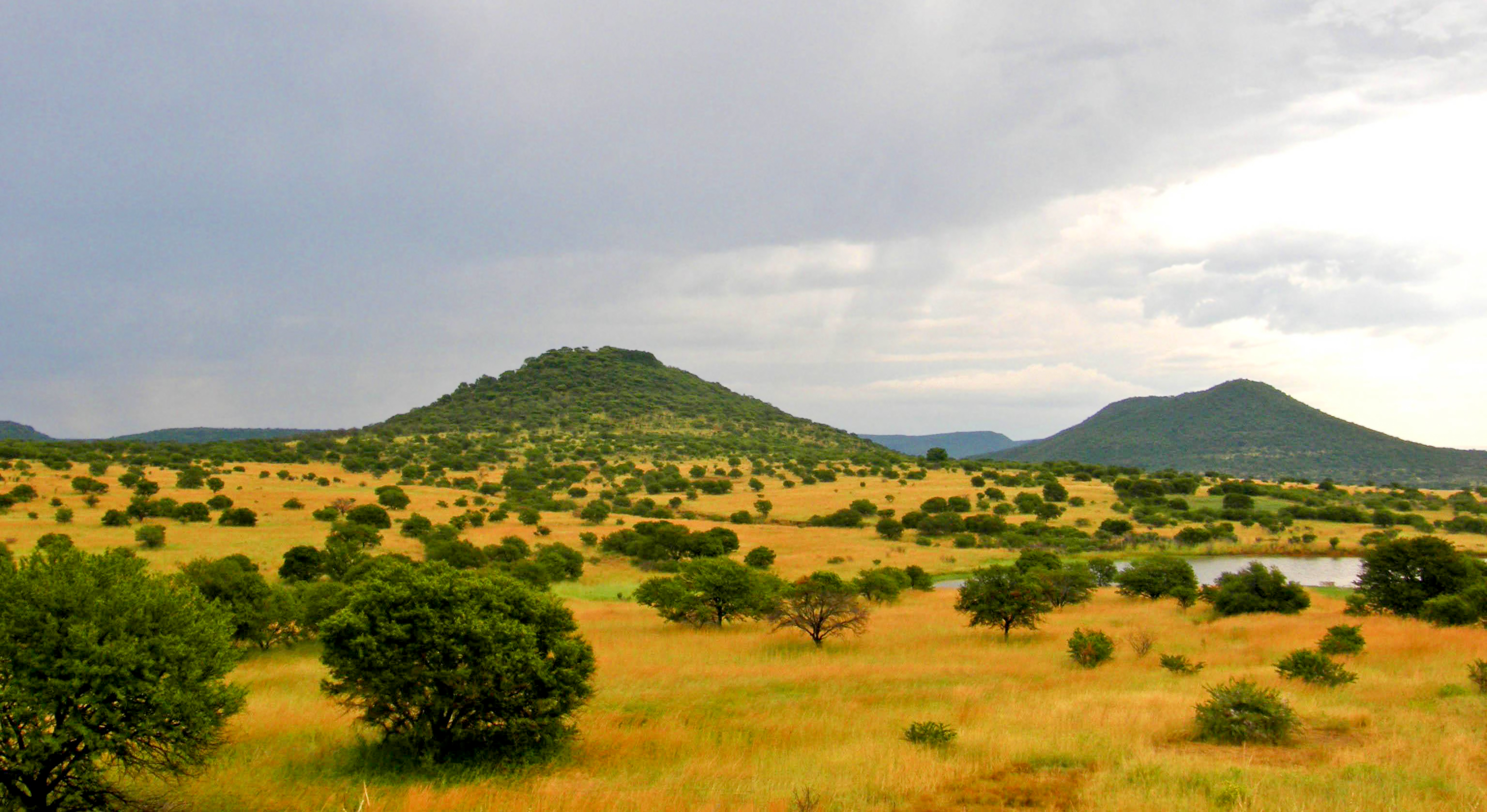
Upland savannah near Pietermaritzburg

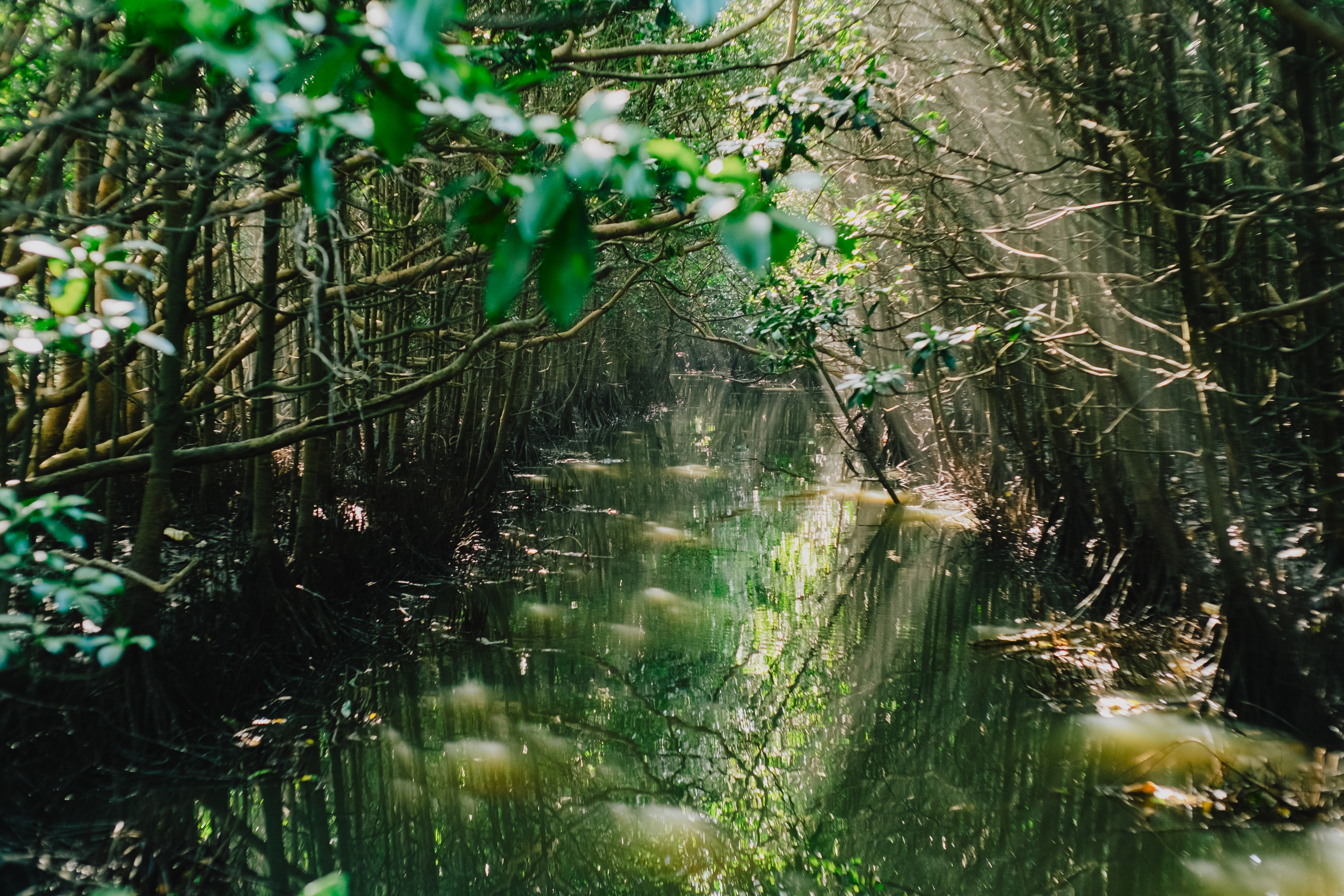
Mangrove forest at the Umgeni River estuary in Durban

KwaZulu-Natal has a varied yet verdant climate thanks to diverse, complex topography. Generally, the coast is subtropical with inland regions becoming progressively colder. Durban on the south coast has an annual rainfall of 1009 mm, with daytime maxima peaking from January to March at 28 °C (82 °F) with a minimum of 21 °C (70 °F), dropping to daytime highs from June to August of 23 °C (73 °F) with a minimum of 11 °C (52 °F).

The temperature drops towards the hinterland, with Pietermaritzburg being similar in the summer, but much cooler in the winter. Ladysmith in the Tugela River Valley reaches 30 °C (86 °F) in the summer but may drop below freezing point on winter evenings. The Drakensberg can experience heavy winter snow, with light snow occasionally experienced on the highest peaks in summer. The Zululand north coast has the warmest climate and highest humidity, supporting many sugar cane farms around Pongola.

=== Borders ===
KwaZulu-Natal borders the following areas of Mozambique, Eswatini and Lesotho:

- Maputo Province, Mozambique (far northeast)
- Lubombo District, Eswatini (northeast, east of Shiselweni)
- Shiselweni District, Eswatini (northeast, west of Lubombo)
- Mokhotlong District, Lesotho (southwest, north of Thaba-Tseka)
- Thaba-Tseka District, Lesotho (southwest, between Mokhotlong and Qacha's Nek)
- Qacha's Nek District, Lesotho (southwest, south of Thaba-Tseka)

Domestically, it borders the following provinces:

- Mpumalanga (north)
- Free State (west)
- Eastern Cape (southwest)

=== Administrative divisions ===
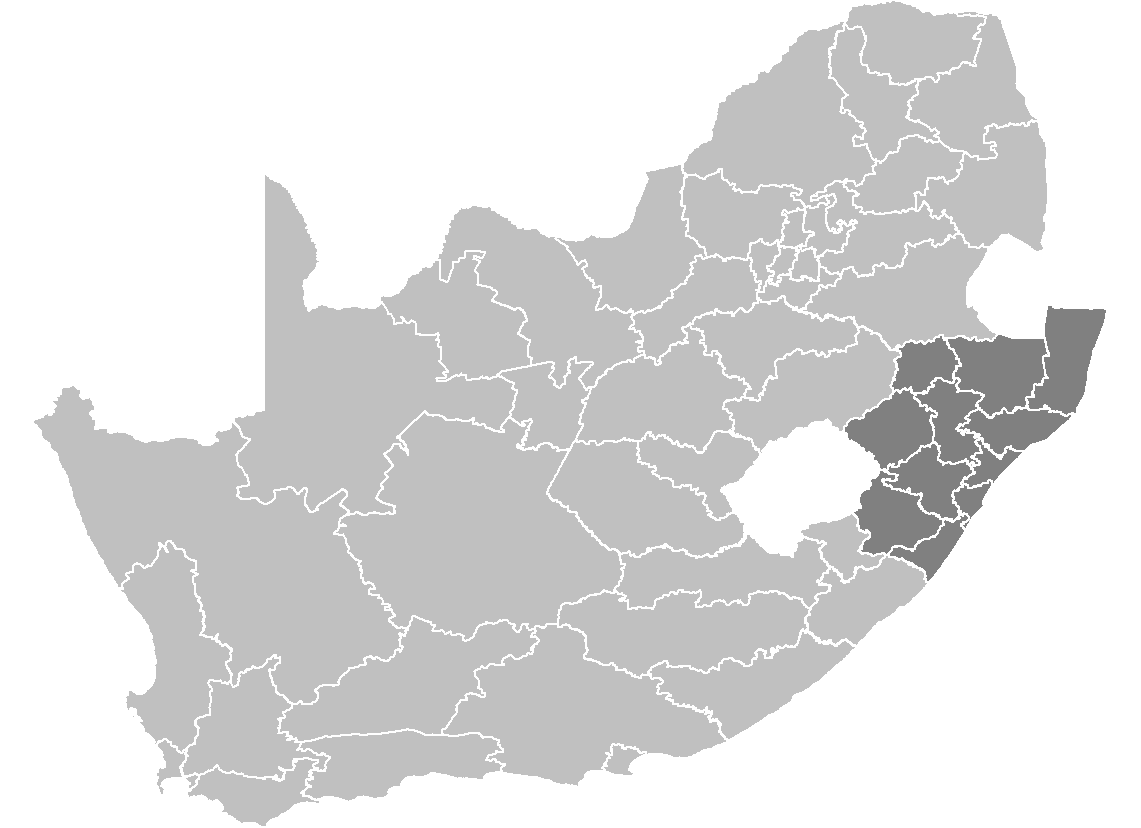
A map of South Africa showing the districts of KwaZulu-Natal province

Population density in KwaZulu-Natal: <1 /km^{2}; 1–3 /km^{2}; 3–10 /km^{2}; 10–30 /km^{2}; 30–100 /km^{2}; 100–300 /km^{2}; 300–1000 /km^{2}; 1000–3000 /km^{2}; >3000 /km^{2}

Dominant languages in KwaZulu-Natal: Afrikaans; English; Xhosa; Zulu; Sotho; Swati; No language dominant

The KwaZulu-Natal Province is divided into one metropolitan municipality and ten district municipalities. The district municipalities are in turn divided into 44 local municipalities. The local seat of each district municipality is given in parentheses:

In 2012, the Ingonyama Trust owns 32% of the land in KwaZulu-Natal, in many municipalities. This amounts to about three million hectares, occupied by over 4 million people. The Zulu king is the chairman of the Trust.

==== Metropolitan municipalities ====
- eThekwini Metropolitan Municipality (Durban)

==== District municipalities ====
- Amajuba District (Newcastle)
  - Newcastle
  - Dannhauser
  - eMadlangeni
- Uthukela District (Ladysmith)
  - Emnambithi/Ladysmith
  - Indaka
  - Umtshezi
  - Okhahlamba
  - Imbabazane
- Zululand District (Ulundi)
  - Ulundi
  - Nongoma
  - Abaqulusi
  - uPhongolo
  - eDumbe
- uMkhanyakude District (Mkuze)
  - Jozini
  - Hlabisa
  - Umhlabuyalingana
  - Mtubatuba
  - The Big 5 False Bay
- King Cetshwayo District (Richards Bay) [formerly uThungulu]
  - uMhlathuze
  - Umlalazi
  - Nkandla
  - Mbonambi
  - Ntambanana
  - Mthonjaneni
- uMzinyathi District (Dundee)
  - Msinga
  - Nqutu
  - Umvoti
  - Endumeni
- uMgungundlovu District (Pietermaritzburg)
  - Msunduzi
  - uMshwathi
  - uMngeni
  - Richmond
  - Mkhambathini
  - Mpofana
  - Impendle
- iLembe District (kwaDukuza)
  - KwaDukuza
  - Ndwedwe
  - Mandeni
  - Maphumulo
- Ugu District (Port Shepstone)
  - Ray Nkonyeni
  - uMdoni
  - uMuziwabantu
  - Umzumbe
- Harry Gwala District (Ixopo)
  - Dr Nkosazana Dlamini-Zuma
  - Johannes Phumani Phungula (formerly Ubuhlebezwe)
  - Greater Kokstad
  - Umzimkhulu

=== Coastline ===
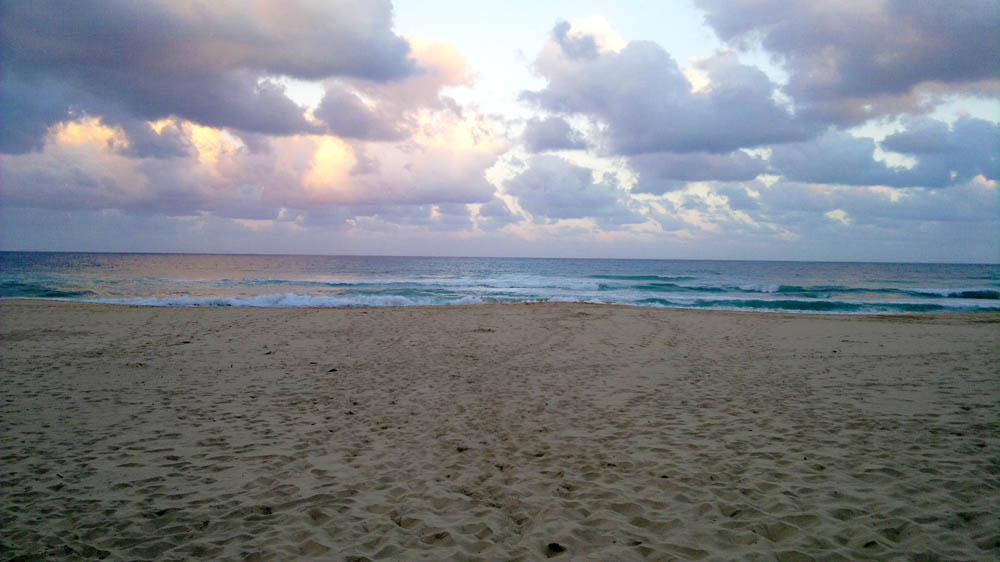
A beach on the North Coast

The coastline is dotted with small towns, many of which serve as seasonal recreational hubs. The climate of the coastal areas is humid and subtropical, comparable to southern Florida in the United States, but not quite as hot and rainy in the summer. As one moves further north up the coast towards the border of Mozambique, the climate becomes almost purely tropical. North of Durban is locally referred to as "The North Coast", while south is "The South Coast". The Kwazulu-Natal Tourist board includes towns such as Margate, Port Shepstone, Scottburgh and Port Edward in its definition of the South Coast, while Ballito, uMhlanga, Zimbali and Salt Rock are North Coast resort towns.

San Lameer Resort

Beaches of world-class quality are to be found along virtually every part of South Africa's eastern seaboard, with some of the least-developed gems found in the far southern and far northern ends of the province. Marina Beach (and its adjoining resort San Lameer) was recognised in 2002 as a Blue Flag beach.

Some visitors come for the annual late autumn or early winter phenomenon on the KwaZulu-Natal coast of the "sardine run". Referred to as "the greatest shoal on earth", the sardine run occurs when millions of sardines migrate from their spawning grounds south of the southern tip of Africa northward along the Eastern Cape coastline toward KwaZulu-Natal. They follow a route close inshore, often resulting in many fish washing up on beaches. The huge shoal of tiny fish can stretch for many kilometres; it is preyed upon by thousands of predators, including game fish, sharks, dolphins and seabirds. Usually, the shoals break up and the fish disappear into deeper water around Durban. Scientists have been unable to answer many questions surrounding this exceptional seasonal event.

=== Interior ===
The interior of the province consists largely of rolling hills from the Valley of a Thousand Hills to the Midlands. Their beauty has inspired literature. Alan Paton, in the novel Cry, the Beloved Country, wrote:

There is a lovely road that runs from Ixopo into the hills. These hills are grass-covered and rolling, and they are lovely beyond any singing of it. The road climbs seven miles (11 km) into them, to Carisbrooke; and from there, if there is no mist, you look down on one of the fairest valleys of Africa. About you there is grass and bracken and you may hear the forlorn crying of the titihoya, one of the birds of the veld. Below you is the valley of the Umzimkulu, on its journey from the Drakensberg to the sea; and beyond and behind the river, great hill after great hill; and beyond and behind them, the mountains of Ingeli and Griqualand East.

== History ==
Zululand or KwaZulu has various definitions: The Zulu Kingdom in 1879. The KwaZulu Bantustan in 1994. The Zululand District Municipality in 2016. The KwaZulu-Natal Province in 2016. The Anglican Church's Diocese of Zululand in 2025. The area where the Zulu language is dominant (in 2011). The area where the Zulu language is significant (in 2011).

On Christmas Day 1497, Portuguese explorer Vasco da Gama saw the coast of Natal and named the site after the Portuguese word for Christmas, Natal. The Nguni branch of the Bantu occupied this area from the early 1300s.

The first European settlers, mostly British, established Port Natal, a trading post. They made almost no attempt to develop the interior, whose inhabitants had been decimated by the Zulu king, Shaka. The Afrikaner Voortrekkers entered the area via the Drakensberg passes in 1837. These Afrikaners defeated the Zulus at the Battle of Blood River in 1838 and thereafter established the Republic of Natal. Thus, the territory was once part of a short-lived Boer republic between 1839 and 1843 until its annexation by Britain. Many Afrikaner inhabitants left for the interior after the annexation and were replaced by immigrants, mainly from Britain.

From 1860 onwards, increasing numbers of Indians, mainly Tamils, were brought in by the British mainly to work in the sugar plantations on the coast. The colony acquired Zululand (the area north of the Tugela River) after the Zulu War of 1879. The lands north of the Buffalo River were added in 1902. Boer forces entered the area during the South African War (1899 to 1902) – also known as the second Boer War – and laid siege to Ladysmith. They failed to build on their initial advantage and for three months the line between the opposing forces followed the course of the Tugela River. In 1910, the colony became a province of the Union of South Africa and in 1961 of the Republic of South Africa.

When the homeland of KwaZulu, which means "Place of the Zulu" was re-incorporated into the Natal province after the end of apartheid in 1994, the province of Natal, which had existed between 1910 and 1994, was renamed KwaZulu-Natal. The province is home to the Zulu monarchy; the majority population speak Zulu. It is the only province in South Africa that has the name of its dominant ethnic group as part of its name. As with Eastern Cape, most White South Africans in KwaZulu-Natal are of British descent and less than a quarter of whites in the province are of Boer/Afrikaner descent.

== Provincial coat of arms ==
The lion and wildebeest supporters are symbols of, respectively, KwaZulu and Natal, the regions joined to create KwaZulu-Natal. Besides its importance as a symbol of the Zulu monarchy, the lion is also featured in the state emblems of the India and the United Kingdom which together represent the three largest people groups in KwaZulu-Natal and also represents the unity between them. The zig-zag stripe represents the Drakensberg, which is green in summer, but snowcapped in winter.

The star represents the Star of Bethlehem, due to Vasco da Gama naming the region "Natalia", a reference to the birth of Christ, on Christmas Day in 1497. The strelitzia flower on the shield symbolizes the province's beauty. The assegai and knobkierrie behind the shield represent protection and peace. The base of the crown element is a type of headdress traditionally worn by Zulu elders, that represents wisdom and maturity. The element itself is a Zulu-style grass hut. The motto is Masisukume Sakhe, Zulu for "Let us stand up and build".

== Law and government ==
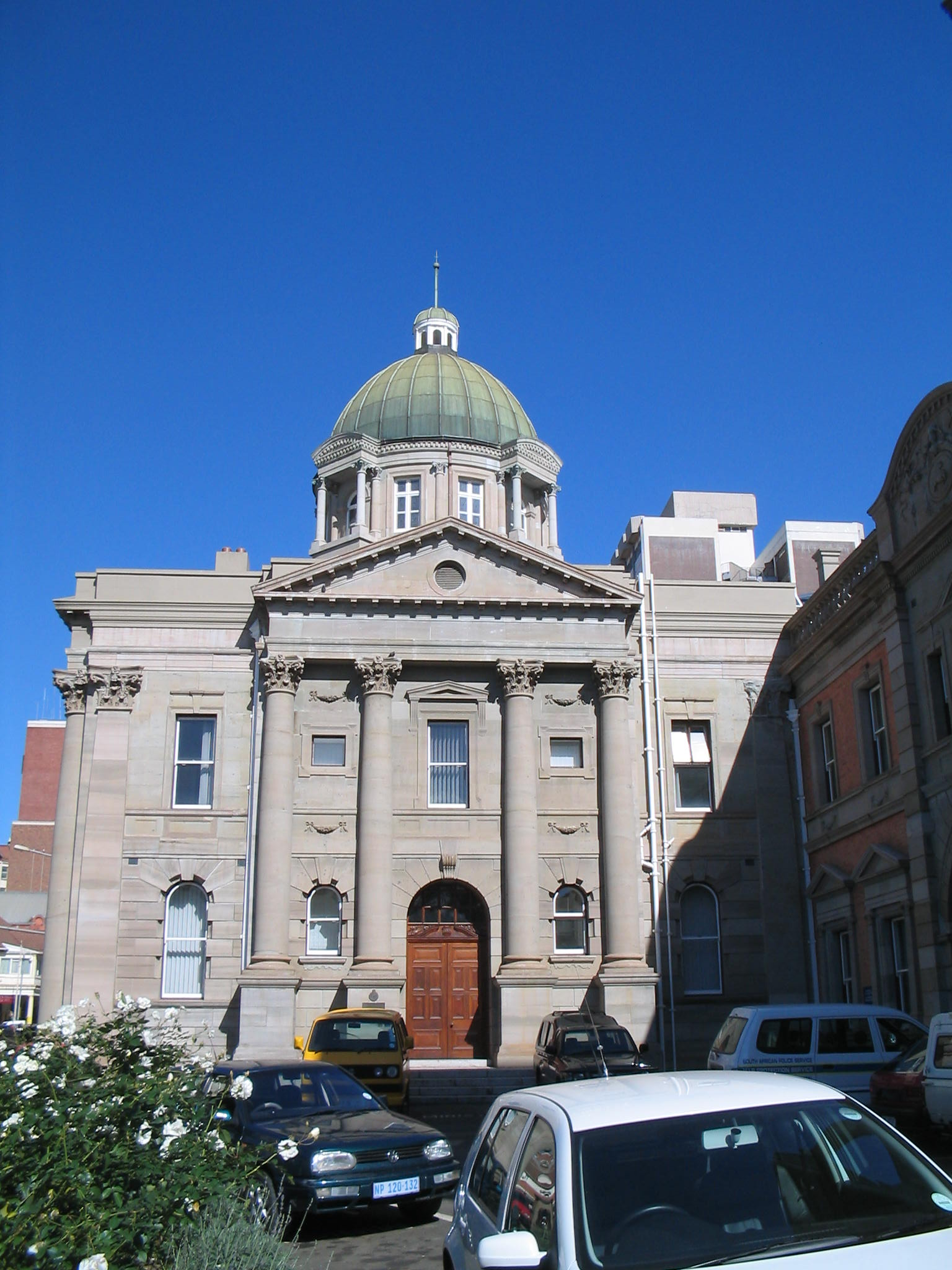
The KwaZulu-Natal parliament building, located in Pietermaritzburg

=== Provincial government ===
KwaZulu-Natal's provincial government sits in Pietermaritzburg. The foundation stone of the new legislative building was laid on 21 June 1887, to commemorate Queen Victoria's Golden Jubilee. The building was completed two years later. On 25 April 1889, the Governor of Natal, Sir Arthur Havelock, opened the first Legislative Council session in the new building.

This was the former site of St Mary's Church, built in the 1860s. The congregation built a new church in 1884 at the corner of Burger Street and Commercial Road. The old building was demolished in 1887 to provide space for the legislative complex.

When governance was granted to Natal in 1893, the new Legislative Assembly took over the chamber used by the Legislative Council since 1889. Further extensions to the parliamentary building were made. The building was unoccupied until 1902, when it was used without being officially opened, due to the country's being engulfed in the Anglo-Boer war. The war forced the Legislative Assembly to move the venue of its sittings, as its chamber was used as a military hospital.

The Legislative Assembly and the Legislative Council buildings have both been protected as provincial landmarks. They formed a colonial Parliament of two houses: a Council of 11 nominated members and an Assembly of 37 elected members. The Natal Parliament was disbanded in 1910 when the Union of South Africa was formed, and the Assembly became the meeting place of the Natal Provincial Council. The council was disbanded in 1986.

The Provincial Legislature consists of 80 members.

=== Current composition ===
The 2024 election saw a major upheaval in KwaZulu-Natal's political landscape. The African National Congress (ANC), which had won a majority in the province in every election since 2004, saw its vote collapse by nearly two-thirds, down to 17% and in third place. In contrast, uMkhonto we Sizwe, a new party led by former President Jacob Zuma, became the province's largest party, winning 45% of the vote, primarily among the province's ethnic Zulu majority. After the election, the Inkatha Freedom Party (IFP), which previously had been the province's official opposition party, formed a coalition government with the ANC, the Democratic Alliance (DA), and the National Freedom Party. As part of the coalition agreement, the IFP's Thami Ntuli became premier, making him the first IFP member to hold the position in twenty years.

Party	Votes	%	+/–	Seats	+/–
uMkhonto we Sizwe	1,590,813	45.35	New	37	New
Inkatha Freedom Party	633,771	18.07	▲2.73	15	▲2
African National Congress	595,958	16.99	▼27.23	14	▼30
Democratic Alliance	468,515	13.36	▼0.54	11	0
Economic Freedom Fighters	79,211	2.26	▼7.65	2	▼6
National Freedom Party	19,548	0.56	▼1.01	1	0
Moodley Thanasagren Rubbanathan	12,323	0.35	New	0	New
African Christian Democratic Party	11,366	0.32	▼0.16	0	▼1
ActionSA	9,569	0.27	New	0	New
Allied Movement for Change	8,007	0.23	New	0	New
Patriotic Alliance	7,843	0.22	New	0	New
African Transformation Movement	6,477	0.18	▼0.31	0	▼1
Democratic Liberal Congress	6,126	0.17	▼0.21	0	0
Al Jama-ah	6,012	0.17	▼0.11	0	0
Freedom Front Plus	5,638	0.16	▼0.15	0	0
Build One South Africa	4,648	0.13	New	0	New
African People's Movement	4,117	0.12	New	0	New
Rise Mzansi	3,898	0.11	New	0	New
Pan Africanist Congress of Azania	3,817	0.11	▲0.04	0	0
Justice and Employment Party	3,626	0.10	▼0.13	0	0
Congress of the People	3,615	0.10	▼0.04	0	0
Abantu Batho Congress	3,214	0.09	New	0	New
People's Freedom Party	3,162	0.09	New	0	New
Sizwe Ummah Nation	2,731	0.08	New	0	New
United Democratic Movement	2,565	0.07	▼0.03	0	0
African Independent Congress	2,527	0.07	▼0.19	0	0
African Movement Congress	2,049	0.06	New	0	New
Good	2,005	0.06	▼0.05	0	0
Arise SA	1,958	0.06	New	0	New
African People First	1,007	0.03	New	0	New
Economic Liberators Forum South Africa	679	0.02	New	0	New
All Citizens Party	631	0.02	New	0	New
Africa Restoration Alliance	629	0.02	New	0	New
Total	3,508,055	100.00	–	80	–
Valid votes	3,508,055	98.88			
Invalid/blank votes	39,761	1.12			
Total votes	3,547,816	100.00			
Registered voters/turnout	5,738,249	61.83			
Source: Electoral Commission of South Africa

Inkatha Freedom Party's Thami Ntuli was officially inaugurated as the Premier of KwaZulu-Natal on 18 June 2024.

=== Zulu monarchy ===
KwaZulu-Natal is the home to the Zulu monarch, currently King Misuzulu Zulu kaZwelithini. As of 2015, the King of the Zulu Nation is provided a stipend of 54 million South African rands by the provincial government. He is also the chairman of the Ingonyama Trust, which controls 32% of the area of the province. Under provincial legislation the Zulu monarch is considered the monarch of the province of KwaZulu-Natal. The King's constitutional powers are limited. This makes KwaZulu-Natal, uniquely among South African provinces, a parliamentary constitutional monarchy.

== Demographics ==
As of the 2022 census, KwaZulu-Natal had a population of 12,423,907, an increase of 21.0% from the prior census in 2011. It is the second-most populous of South Africa's nine provinces. The median age is 28, an increase of 6 years from 2011.

=== Race/Ethnicity ===
In the 2022 census, 85% of the population described themselves as Black African, 9.3% as Indian/Asian, 4.1% as White, and 1.3% as Coloured. A large majority of Black African people in the province are Zulu. KwaZulu-Natal has the largest Indian population in South Africa, with a majority of all Indian South Africans living in the province. A majority of the White population is of British descent, making it one of only two provinces (along with the Eastern Cape) where Whites of British descent outnumber Afrikaners.

Historic Breakdown of Population by Group
Population Group	1996	2001	2011	2022
Black African	82.8%	85.2%	86.9%	85%
Indian/Asian	9.3%	8.3%	7.4%	9.3%
White	6.6%	5.0%	4.2%	4.1%
Coloured	1.4%	1.5%	1.4%	1.3%
Other	n/a	n/a	0.3%	0.3%

=== Languages ===
In the 2022 census, 81.8% of the population reported their first language as Zulu, 14.4% as English, 3.1% as Xhosa, and 1.0% as Afrikaans. KwaZulu-Natal is the only province in which native Zulu-speakers form a majority of the population. The province also has the second-highest proportion of English speakers of South Africa's nine provinces (after the Western Cape).

=== Religion ===
According to the 2022 census, 75% of the population described themselves as Christians, the lowest proportion among South Africa's nine provinces. Substantial minorities of the population practice Traditional African religions, Hinduism, and Islam.

Religious Affiliation (2022)
Christianity	75%
Traditional African	13.6%
Hinduism	4.2%
Islam	1.9%
Buddhism	0.1%
Atheism	0.1%
Agnosticism	0.1%
No religious affiliation	3.3%
Other	1.8%

== Economy ==
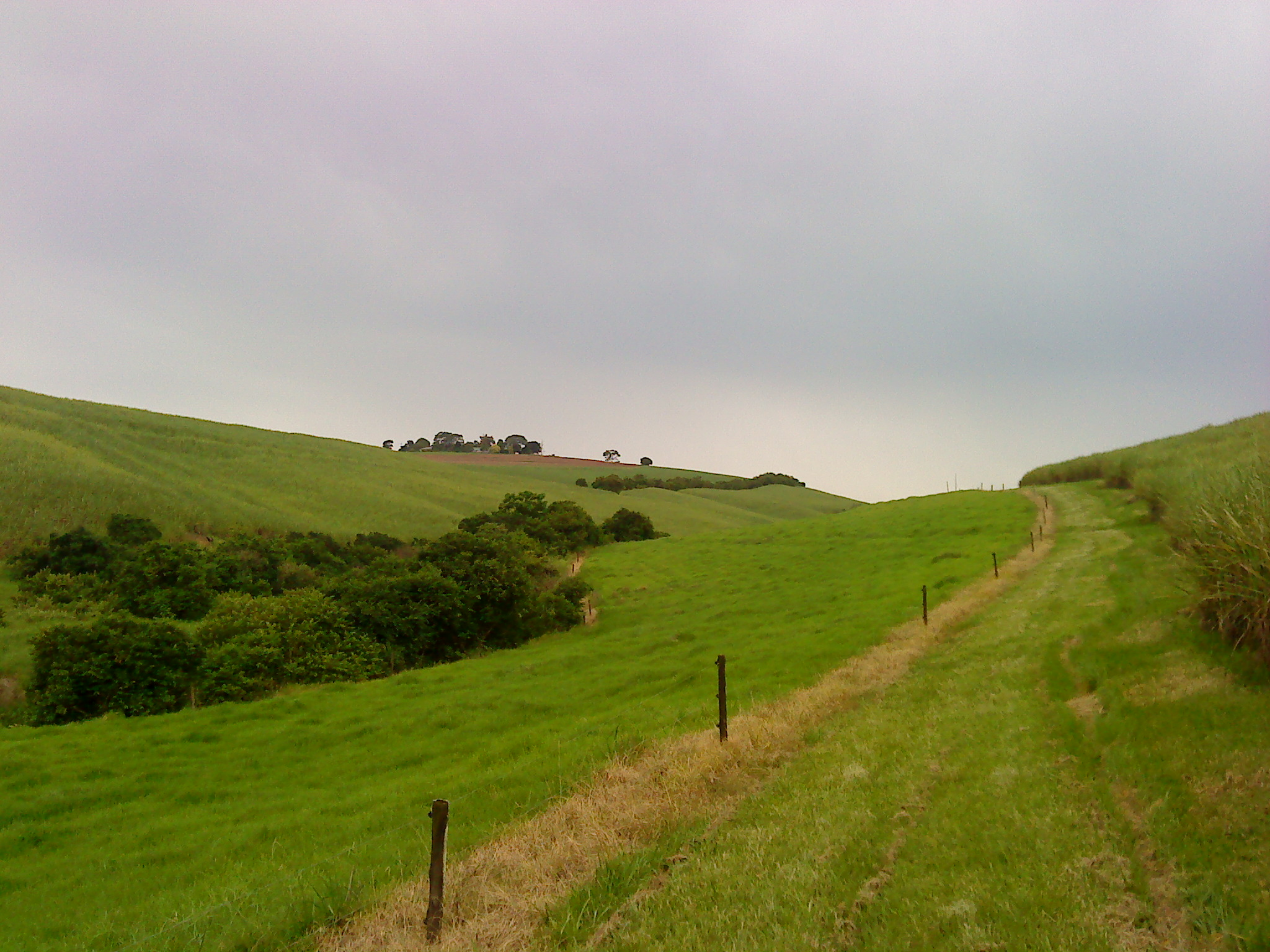
Sugar cane in Midlands South

KwaZulu-Natal has the second largest regional economy in the country after Gauteng. Durban is a rapidly growing urban area and is by most measures the busiest port in Africa. A good railway network links the city to other areas of Southern Africa.

Sugar refining is Durban's main industry. Sheep, cattle, dairy, citrus fruits, corn, sorghum, cotton, bananas, and pineapples are also raised. There is an embryonic KwaZulu-Natal wine industry. Other industries, located mainly in and around Durban, include textile, clothing, chemicals, rubber, fertiliser, paper, vehicle assembly and food-processing plants, tanneries, and oil refineries.

To the north, Newcastle is the province's industrial powerhouse, with Mittal Steel South Africa (previously ISPAT/ISCOR) and the Karbochem synthetic rubber plant dominating the economy. In 2002, Newcastle became the largest producer of chrome chemicals in Africa with the completion of a chrome-chemical plant, a joint-venture project between Karbochem and German manufacturing giant Bayer.

Other large operations include a diamond-cutting works, various heavy engineering concerns, the Natal Portland Cement (NPC) slagment cement factory, and the Newcastle Cogeneration Plant (old Ingagane Power Station). This was recommissioned as Africa's first gas-fired power station by Independent Power Southern Africa (IPSA), and it supplies the Karbochem Plant with electricity. The textile industry is a major employer in the Newcastle area, with over 100 factories belonging to ethnic Taiwanese and Chinese industrialists. Maize, livestock and dairy farmers operate on the outskirts of the city. Coal is mined in the Newcastle area.

Offshore mining of heavy mineral sands including minerals with a concentration of significant economic importance at several locations, such as rutile, ilmenite and zircon are threatening the marine ecology of KwaZulu-Natal's coast, including the Tugela Banks. The fishing economy of the prawn and nurse fisheries are also threatened.

Ecology tourism is increasingly important to the economy of KwaZulu-Natal. The area's rich biodiversity and efforts at conservation have been recognised. Tourists have come to see the iSimangaliso Wetland Park and the uKhahlamba Drakensberg Park, declared UNESCO World Heritage Sites. These two major parks and that of Ndumo have wetlands of international importance listed as Ramsar sites for conservation.

== Civil society ==
Prominent civil society organisations based in the province of KwaZulu-Natal include: Abahlali baseMjondolo (shackdwellers') movement, the Diakonia Council of Churches, the Right2Know campaign, and the Unemployed People's Movement.

== Ecology ==
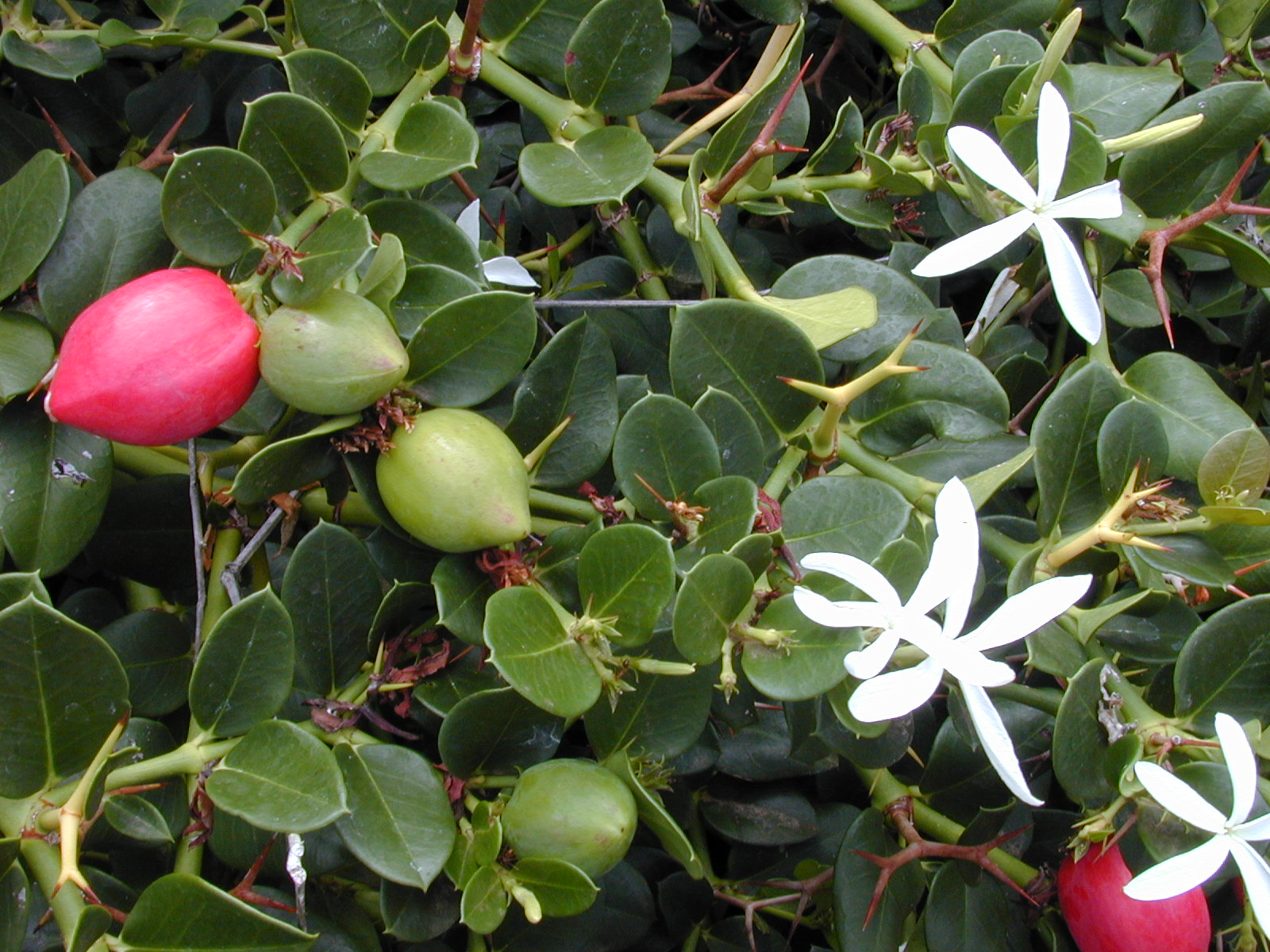
Natal plum

There are various game reserves found in the province; one notable example is Hluhluwe–Imfolozi Park, where the southern white rhinoceros was saved from extinction.

In many of these larger reserves, large animals ranging from several antelope species to elephant, Cape buffalo and hippopotamus can be found. Predators include lions, leopards, and Cape wild dogs.

The scaly yellowfish (Labeobarbus natalensis) is a fish found in the Tugela River system as well as in the Umzimkulu, Umfolozi and the Mgeni. It is a common endemic species in KwaZulu-Natal Province and it lives in different habitats between the Drakensberg foothills and the coastal lowlands.

Carissa macrocarpa (Natal plum) is a shrub native to South Africa, where it is commonly called the "large num-num". In the Zulu language or isiZulu, as well as in the Bantu tribes of Uganda, it is known as the Amathungulu or umThungulu oBomvu. In Afrikaans, the fruit is called noem-noem.

== Education ==
=== Universities ===
The University of KwaZulu-Natal (UKZN) has five campuses in the province. It was formed on 1 January 2004 after the merger between the University of Natal and the University of Durban-Westville. Other universities are:

- University of Zululand
- Durban University of Technology (DUT)
- Mangosuthu University of Technology (MUT)
- University of South Africa (UNISA)

=== Private colleges ===
- Damelin College
- Eduvos
- MANCOSA
- Regent Business School
- Varsity College

== Sport ==
=== Major sports events ===
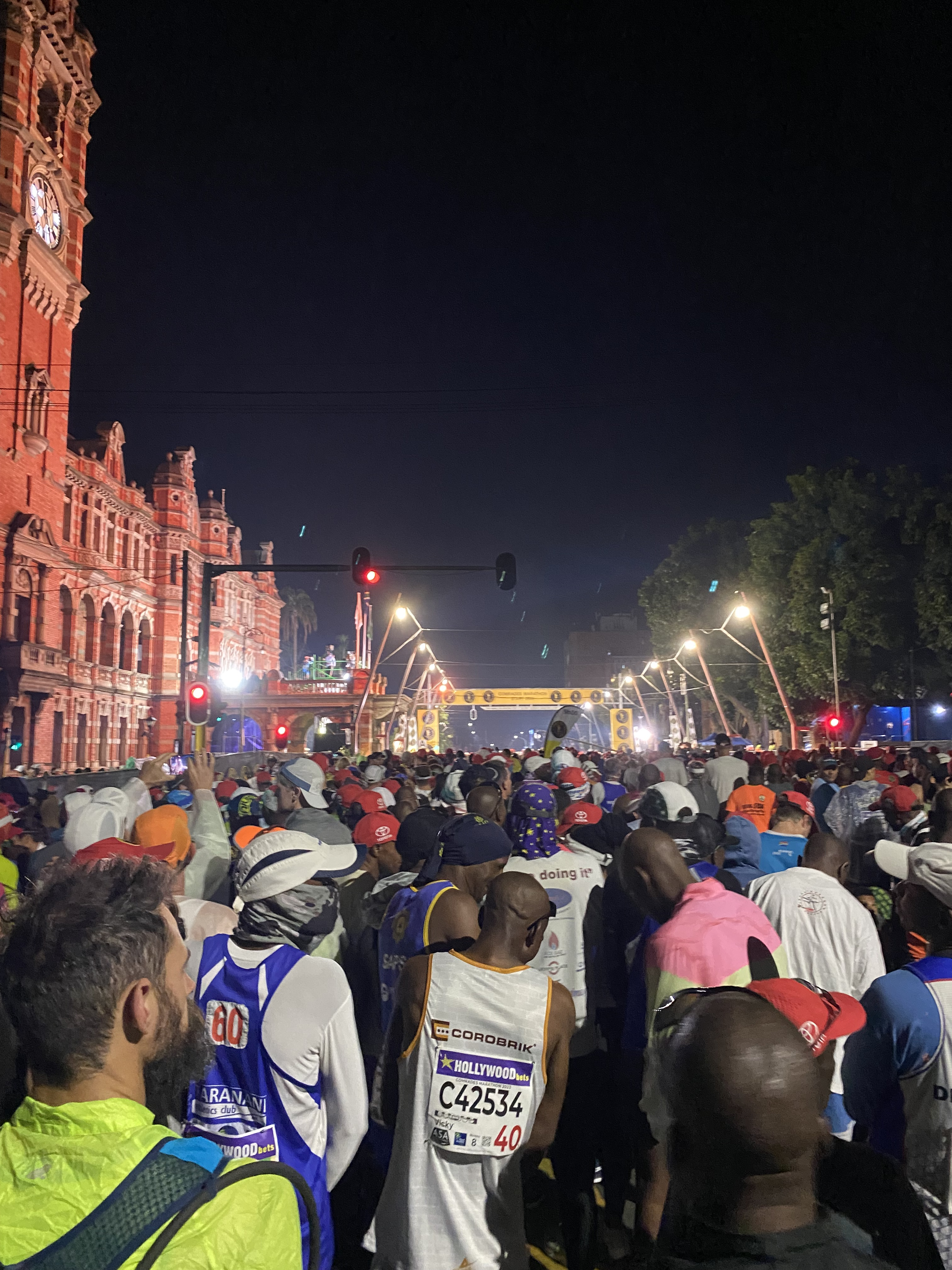
Runners lined up in Pietermaritzburg at the start of the 2023 Comrades Marathon

- Comrades Marathon, an annual marathon run between Pietermaritzburg and Durban.
- Midmar Mile, a mile-long swimming race held annually at Midmar Dam.
- Dusi Canoe Marathon, an annual canoe marathon starting in Pietermaritzburg and ending in Durban.
- Durban July, South Africa's premier annual horse racing event at Greyville Racecourse, Durban.

=== Major sports teams ===
Soccer
As of July 2025, the following teams play in the Premier Soccer League's Premiership and National First Division:

AmaZulu, Durban City, Golden Arrows, Milford (Durban)
Midlands Wanderers (Pietermaritzburg)
Richards Bay (Richards Bay)

Rugby union
United Rugby Championship

The Sharks

Currie Cup

Sharks

Cricket

Dolphins playing in the CSA 4-Day Domestic Series (successor to the KwaZulu-Natal cricket team)
Tuskers

Basketball
KwaZulu Marlins
