= List of municipalities in South Africa =

The municipalities of South Africa as of 2016

This is a list of municipalities of South Africa. The largest metropolitan areas are governed by metropolitan municipalities, while the rest of the country is divided into district municipalities, each of which consists of several local municipalities.

Since the boundary reform at the time of the municipal election of 3 August 2016 there are 8 metropolitan municipalities, 44 district municipalities and 205 local municipalities.

== Metropolitan municipalities ==
Name	Code	Province	Seat	Area		Population (2022)	Pop. density	
Name	Code	Province	Seat	km^{2}	sq mi	Population (2022)	per km^{2}	per sq mi
Buffalo City Metropolitan Municipality	BUF	Eastern Cape	East London	2,752.6	1,062.8	975,255	354.3	918
City of Cape Town Metropolitan Municipality	CPT	Western Cape	Cape Town	2,440.6	942.3	4,772,846	1,955.6	5,065
City of Ekurhuleni Metropolitan Municipality	EKU	Gauteng	Germiston	1,975.7	762.8	4,066,691	2,058.4	5,331
City of Johannesburg Metropolitan Municipality	JHB	Gauteng	Johannesburg	1,642.6	634.2	4,803,262	2,924.2	7,574
City of Tshwane Metropolitan Municipality	TSH	Gauteng	Pretoria	6,297.8	2,431.6	4,040,315	641.5	1,661
eThekwini Metropolitan Municipality	ETH	KwaZulu-Natal	Durban	2,555.9	986.8	4,239,901	1,658.9	4,297
Mangaung Metropolitan Municipality	MAN	Free State	Bloemfontein	9,886.3	3,817.1	811,431	82.1	213
Nelson Mandela Bay Metropolitan Municipality	NMA	Eastern Cape	Gqeberha	1,957.0	755.6	1,190,496	608.3	1,575

== District municipalities ==
South Africa's 44 district municipalities

Eastern Cape
Free State
Gauteng
KwaZulu-Natal
Limpopo
Mpumalanga
North West
Northern Cape
Western Cape

For comparison purposes the metropolitan municipalities are also included in this list.

Name	Code	Province	Seat	Area		Population (2022)	Pop. density	
Name	Code	Province	Seat	km^{2}	sq mi	Population (2022)	per km^{2}	per sq mi
Alfred Nzo District Municipality	DC44	Eastern Cape	Mount Ayliff	10,731.2	4,143.3	936,462	87.3	226
Amajuba District Municipality	DC25	KwaZulu-Natal	Newcastle	7,102.4	2,742.3	687,408	96.8	251
Amathole District Municipality	DC12	Eastern Cape	East London	21,114.9	8,152.5	871,601	41.3	107
Bojanala District Municipality	DC37	North West	Rustenburg	18,333.4	7,078.6	1,624,428	88.6	229
Buffalo City Metropolitan Municipality	BUF	Eastern Cape	East London	2,752.6	1,062.8	975,255	354.3	918
Cape Winelands District Municipality	DC2	Western Cape	Worcester	21,477.0	8,292.3	862,703	40.2	104
Capricorn District Municipality	DC35	Limpopo	Polokwane	21,705.5	8,380.5	1,447,103	66.7	173
Central Karoo District Municipality	DC5	Western Cape	Beaufort West	38,854.0	15,001.6	102,173	2.6	6.7
Chris Hani District Municipality	DC13	Eastern Cape	Queenstown	36,406.8	14,056.7	828,387	22.8	59
City of Cape Town Metropolitan Municipality	CPT	Western Cape	Cape Town	2,440.6	942.3	4,772,846	1,955.6	5,065
City of Ekurhuleni Metropolitan Municipality	EKU	Gauteng	Germiston	1,975.7	762.8	4,066,691	2,058.4	5,331
City of Johannesburg Metropolitan Municipality	JHB	Gauteng	Johannesburg	1,642.6	634.2	4,803,262	2,924.2	7,574
City of Tshwane Metropolitan Municipality	TSH	Gauteng	Pretoria	6,297.8	2,431.6	4,040,315	641.5	1,661
Dr Kenneth Kaunda District Municipality	DC40	North West	Klerksdorp	14,670.8	5,664.4	734,203	50.0	129
Dr Ruth Segomotsi Mompati District Municipality	DC39	North West	Vryburg	43,752.6	16,893.0	508,192	11.6	30
Ehlanzeni District Municipality	DC32	Mpumalanga	Nelspruit	27,895.6	10,770.6	2,270,897	81.4	211
eThekwini Metropolitan Municipality	ETH	KwaZulu-Natal	Durban	2,555.9	986.8	4,239,901	1,658.9	4,297
Fezile Dabi District Municipality	DC20	Free State	Sasolburg	20,673.3	7,982.0	509,912	24.7	64
Frances Baard District Municipality	DC9	Northern Cape	Kimberley	13,001.6	5,019.9	434,343	33.4	87
Garden Route District Municipality	DC4	Western Cape	George	23,331.1	9,008.2	838,457	35.9	93
Gert Sibande District Municipality	DC30	Mpumalanga	Ermelo	31,840.9	12,293.8	1,283,459	40.3	104
Harry Gwala District Municipality	DC43	KwaZulu-Natal	Ixopo	10,387.1	4,010.5	563,893	54.3	141
iLembe District Municipality	DC29	KwaZulu-Natal	KwaDukuza	3,269.3	1,262.3	782,661	239.4	620
Joe Gqabi District Municipality	DC14	Eastern Cape	Barkly East	25,617.1	9,890.8	393,048	15.3	40
John Taolo Gaetsewe District Municipality	DC45	Northern Cape	Kuruman	27,322.5	10,549.3	272,454	10.0	26
King Cetshwayo District Municipality	DC28	KwaZulu-Natal	Richards Bay	8,213.3	3,171.2	1,021,344	124.4	322
Lejweleputswa District Municipality	DC18	Free State	Welkom	32,287.0	12,466.1	679,746	21.1	55
Mangaung Metropolitan Municipality	MAN	Free State	Bloemfontein	9,886.3	3,817.1	811,431	82.1	213
Mopani District Municipality	DC33	Limpopo	Giyani	20,010.8	7,726.2	1,372,873	68.6	178
Namakwa District Municipality	DC6	Northern Cape	Springbok	126,836.3	48,971.8	148,935	1.2	3.1
Nelson Mandela Bay Metropolitan Municipality	NMA	Eastern Cape	Port Elizabeth	1,957.0	755.6	1,190,496	608.3	1,575
Ngaka Modiri Molema District Municipality	DC38	North West	Mahikeng	28,124.7	10,859.0	937,723	33.3	86
Nkangala District Municipality	DC31	Mpumalanga	Middelburg	16,758.4	6,470.5	1,588,968	94.8	246
OR Tambo District Municipality	DC15	Eastern Cape	Mthatha	12,141.2	4,687.7	1,501,702	123.7	320
Overberg District Municipality	DC3	Western Cape	Bredasdorp	12,240.3	4,726.0	359,446	29.4	76
Pixley ka Seme District Municipality	DC7	Northern Cape	De Aar	103,223.3	39,854.7	216,589	2.1	5.4
Sarah Baartman District Municipality	DC10	Eastern Cape	Port Elizabeth	58,245.3	22,488.6	533,253	9.2	24
Sedibeng District Municipality	DC42	Gauteng	Vereeniging	4,172.7	1,611.1	1,190,688	285.4	739
Sekhukhune District Municipality	DC47	Limpopo	Groblersdal	13,527.7	5,223.1	1,336,805	98.8	256
Thabo Mofutsanyana District Municipality	DC19	Free State	Phuthaditjhaba	32,728.9	12,636.7	831,421	25.4	66
Ugu District Municipality	DC21	KwaZulu-Natal	Port Shepstone	4,790.1	1,849.5	773,402	161.5	418
uMgungundlovu District Municipality	DC22	KwaZulu-Natal	Pietermaritzburg	9,602.5	3,707.5	1,235,715	128.7	333
uMkhanyakude District Municipality	DC27	KwaZulu-Natal	Mkuze	13,855.3	5,349.6	738,437	53.3	138
uMzinyathi District Municipality	DC24	KwaZulu-Natal	Dundee	8,652.4	3,340.7	649,261	75.0	194
uThukela District Municipality	DC23	KwaZulu-Natal	Ladysmith	11,134.0	4,298.9	789,092	70.9	184
Vhembe District Municipality	DC34	Limpopo	Thohoyandou	25,596.5	9,882.9	1,653,077	64.6	167
Waterberg District Municipality	DC36	Limpopo	Modimolle	44,913.4	17,341.2	762,862	17.0	44
West Coast District Municipality	DC1	Western Cape	Moorreesburg	31,119.3	12,015.2	497,394	16.0	41
West Rand District Municipality	DC48	Gauteng	Randfontein	4,089.4	1,578.9	998,466	244.2	632
Xhariep District Municipality	DC16	Free State	Trompsburg	34,249.7	13,223.9	131,901	3.9	10
ZF Mgcawu District Municipality	DC8	Northern Cape	Upington	102,505.7	39,577.7	283,624	2.8	7.3
Zululand District Municipality	DC26	KwaZulu-Natal	Ulundi	14,799.2	5,714.0	942,794	63.7	165

== Local municipalities ==
For comparison purposes the metropolitan municipalities are also included in this list.

Name	Code	Province	District	Seat	MIIF classification	Area		Population (2022)	Pop. density	
Name	Code	Province	District	Seat	MIIF classification	km^{2}	sq mi	Population (2022)	per km^{2}	per sq mi
Abaqulusi Local Municipality	KZN263	KwaZulu-Natal	Zululand	Vryheid	B3 (small towns)	4,313.6	1,665.5	247,263	57.3	148
Albert Luthuli Local Municipality	MP301	Mpumalanga	Gert Sibande	Carolina	B4 (mostly rural)	5,553.3	2,144.1	247,664	44.6	116
Alfred Duma Local Municipality	KZN238	KwaZulu-Natal	Uthukela	Ladysmith	B2 (large town)	3,764.4	1,453.4	415,036	110.3	286
Amahlathi Local Municipality	EC124	Eastern Cape	Amathole	Stutterheim	B3 (small towns)	4,505.5	1,739.6	115,703	25.7	67
Ba-Phalaborwa Local Municipality	LIM334	Limpopo	Mopani	Phalaborwa	B3 (small towns)	7,489.6	2,891.8	188,603	25.2	65
Beaufort West Local Municipality	WC053	Western Cape	Central Karoo	Beaufort West	B3 (small towns)	21,916.6	8,462.0	72,972	3.3	8.5
Bela-Bela Local Municipality	LIM366	Limpopo	Waterberg	Bela-Bela	B3 (small towns)	3,406.2	1,315.1	64,306	18.9	49
Bergrivier Local Municipality	WC013	Western Cape	West Coast	Piketberg	B3 (small towns)	4,407.0	1,701.6	70,276	15.9	41
Big Five Hlabisa Local Municipality	KZN276	KwaZulu-Natal	Umkhanyakude	Hlabisa	B3 (small towns)	3,470.1	1,339.8	131,755	38.0	98
Bitou Local Municipality	WC047	Western Cape	Garden Route	Plettenberg Bay	B3 (small towns)	991.9	383.0	65,240	65.8	170
Blouberg Local Municipality	LIM351	Limpopo	Capricorn	Senwabarwana	B4 (mostly rural)	9,539.9	3,683.4	192,109	20.1	52
Blue Crane Route Local Municipality	EC102	Eastern Cape	Sarah Baartman	Somerset East	B3 (small towns)	11,068.5	4,273.6	49,883	4.5	12
Breede Valley Local Municipality	WC025	Western Cape	Cape Winelands	Worcester	B2 (large town)	3,834.0	1,480.3	212,682	55.5	144
Buffalo City Metropolitan Municipality	BUF	Eastern Cape		East London	A (metro)	2,752.6	1,062.8	975,255	354.3	918
Bushbuckridge Local Municipality	MP325	Mpumalanga	Ehlanzeni	Bushbuckridge	B4 (mostly rural)	10,248.2	3,956.9	750,821	73.3	190
Cape Agulhas Local Municipality	WC033	Western Cape	Overberg	Bredasdorp	B3 (small towns)	3,470.0	1,339.8	40,274	11.6	30
Cederberg Local Municipality	WC012	Western Cape	West Coast	Clanwilliam	B3 (small towns)	8,007.5	3,091.7	55,108	6.9	18
City of Cape Town Metropolitan Municipality	CPT	Western Cape		Cape Town	A (metro)	2,440.6	942.3	4,772,846	1,955.6	5,065
City of Ekurhuleni Metropolitan Municipality	EKU	Gauteng		Germiston	A (metro)	1,975.7	762.8	4,066,691	2,058.4	5,331
City of Johannesburg Metropolitan Municipality	JHB	Gauteng		Johannesburg	A (metro)	1,642.6	634.2	4,803,262	2,924.2	7,574
City of Matlosana Local Municipality	NW403	North West	Dr Kenneth Kaunda	Klerksdorp	B1 (secondary city)	3,602.2	1,390.8	431,231	119.7	310
City of Tshwane Metropolitan Municipality	TSH	Gauteng		Pretoria	A (metro)	6,297.8	2,431.6	4,040,315	641.5	1,661
Collins Chabane Local Municipality	LIM345	Limpopo	Vhembe	Malamulele	B4 (mostly rural)	5,003.1	1,931.7	443,798	88.7	230
Dannhauser Local Municipality	KZN254	KwaZulu-Natal	Amajuba	Dannhauser	B4 (mostly rural)	1,707.3	659.2	142,750	83.6	217
Dawid Kruiper Local Municipality	NC087	Northern Cape	ZF Mgcawu	Upington	B2 (large town)	44,399.3	17,142.7	125,744	2.8	7.3
Dihlabeng Local Municipality	FS192	Free State	Thabo Mofutsanyana	Bethlehem	B2 (large town)	4,867.7	1,879.4	130,434	26.8	69
Dikgatlong Local Municipality	NC092	Northern Cape	Frances Baard	Barkly West	B3 (small towns)	7,315.5	2,824.5	56,967	7.8	20
Dipaleseng Local Municipality	MP306	Mpumalanga	Gert Sibande	Balfour	B3 (small towns)	2,607.4	1,006.7	35,980	13.8	36
Ditsobotla Local Municipality	NW384	North West	Ngaka Modiri Molema	Lichtenburg	B3 (small towns)	6,387.1	2,466.1	164,176	25.7	67
Dr AB Xuma Local Municipality	EC137	Eastern Cape	Chris Hani	Ngcobo	B4 (mostly rural)	2,483.9	959.0	132,799	53.5	139
Dr Beyers Naudé Local Municipality	EC101	Eastern Cape	Sarah Baartman	Graaff-Reinet	B3 (small towns)	28,653.0	11,063.0	101,001	3.5	9.1
Dr JS Moroka Local Municipality	MP316	Mpumalanga	Nkangala	Siyabuswa	B4 (mostly rural)	1,416.5	546.9	324,855	229.3	594
Dr Nkosazana Dlamini Zuma Local Municipality	KZN436	KwaZulu-Natal	Harry Gwala	Creighton	B3 (small towns)	3,602.0	1,390.7	128,565	35.7	92
Drakenstein Local Municipality	WC023	Western Cape	Cape Winelands	Paarl	B1 (secondary city)	1,536.6	593.3	276,800	180.1	466
eDumbe Local Municipality	KZN261	KwaZulu-Natal	Zululand	Paulpietersburg	B3 (small towns)	1,942.8	750.1	96,735	49.8	129
Elias Motsoaledi Local Municipality	LIM472	Limpopo	Sekhukhune	Groblersdal	B4 (mostly rural)	3,713.3	1,433.7	288,049	77.6	201
Elundini Local Municipality	EC141	Eastern Cape	Joe Gqabi	Maclear	B4 (mostly rural)	5,018.8	1,937.8	141,762	28.2	73
eMadlangeni Local Municipality	KZN253	KwaZulu-Natal	Amajuba	Utrecht	B3 (small towns)	3,539.3	1,366.5	36,948	10.4	27
Emakhazeni Local Municipality	MP314	Mpumalanga	Nkangala	Belfast	B2 (large town)	4,735.6	1,828.4	50,165	10.6	27
Emalahleni Local Municipality	EC136	Eastern Cape	Chris Hani	Lady Frere	B4 (mostly rural)	3,484.2	1,345.3	128,873	37.0	96
Emalahleni Local Municipality	MP312	Mpumalanga	Nkangala	eMalahleni	B1 (secondary city)	2,677.6	1,033.8	434,522	162.3	420
Emfuleni Local Municipality	GT421	Gauteng	Sedibeng	Vanderbijlpark	B1 (secondary city)	965.6	372.8	945,650	979.3	2,536
Emthanjeni Local Municipality	NC073	Northern Cape	Pixley ka Seme	De Aar	B3 (small towns)	13,472.1	5,201.6	46,587	3.5	9.1
Endumeni Local Municipality	KZN241	KwaZulu-Natal	Umzinyathi	Dundee	B3 (small towns)	1,610.2	621.7	100,085	62.2	161
Enoch Mgijima Local Municipality	EC139	Eastern Cape	Chris Hani	Queenstown	B2 (large town)	13,584.1	5,244.9	297,055	21.9	57
Ephraim Mogale Local Municipality	LIM471	Limpopo	Sekhukhune	Marble Hall	B4 (mostly rural)	2,011.3	776.6	132,468	65.9	171
eThekwini Metropolitan Municipality	ETH	KwaZulu-Natal		Durban	A (metro)	2,555.9	986.8	4,239,901	1,658.9	4,297
Fetakgomo Tubatse Local Municipality	LIM476	Limpopo	Sekhukhune	Apel	B4 (mostly rural)	5,693.5	2,198.3	575,960	101.2	262
Ga-Segonyana Local Municipality	NC452	Northern Cape	John Taolo Gaetsewe	Kuruman	B3 (small towns)	4,494.8	1,735.5	117,454	26.1	68
Gamagara Local Municipality	NC453	Northern Cape	John Taolo Gaetsewe	Kathu	B3 (small towns)	2,647.9	1,022.4	29,580	11.2	29
George Local Municipality	WC044	Western Cape	Garden Route	George	B1 (secondary city)	5,191.0	2,004.3	294,929	56.8	147
Govan Mbeki Local Municipality	MP307	Mpumalanga	Gert Sibande	Secunda	B1 (secondary city)	2,954.7	1,140.8	310,117	105.0	272
Great Kei Local Municipality	EC123	Eastern Cape	Amathole	Komga	B3 (small towns)	1,699.8	656.3	35,990	21.2	55
Greater Giyani Local Municipality	LIM331	Limpopo	Mopani	Giyani	B4 (mostly rural)	4,166.6	1,608.7	316,841	76.0	197
Greater Kokstad Local Municipality	KZN433	KwaZulu-Natal	Harry Gwala	Kokstad	B2 (large town)	2,679.8	1,034.7	81,676	30.5	79
Greater Letaba Local Municipality	LIM332	Limpopo	Mopani	Modjadjiskloof	B4 (mostly rural)	1,895.8	732.0	261,038	137.7	357
Greater Taung Local Municipality	NW394	North West	Dr Ruth Segomotsi Mompati	Taung	B4 (mostly rural)	5,636.5	2,176.3	202,009	35.8	93
Greater Tzaneen Local Municipality	LIM333	Limpopo	Mopani	Tzaneen	B4 (mostly rural)	2,896.2	1,118.2	478,254	165.1	428
Hantam Local Municipality	NC065	Northern Cape	Namakwa	Calvinia	B3 (small towns)	39,084.5	15,090.6	22,281	0.6	1.6
Hessequa Local Municipality	WC042	Western Cape	Garden Route	Riversdale	B3 (small towns)	5,732.6	2,213.4	71,918	12.5	32
Impendle Local Municipality	KZN224	KwaZulu-Natal	uMgungundlovu	Impendle	B4 (mostly rural)	1,609.6	621.5	36,648	22.8	59
Ingquza Hill Local Municipality	EC153	Eastern Cape	OR Tambo	Flagstaff	B4 (mostly rural)	2,476.8	956.3	354,573	143.2	371
Inkosi Langalibalele Local Municipality	KZN237	KwaZulu-Natal	Uthukela	Estcourt	B3 (small towns)	3,398.6	1,312.2	230,924	67.9	176
Intsika Yethu Local Municipality	EC135	Eastern Cape	Chris Hani	Cofimvaba	B4 (mostly rural)	2,846.0	1,098.8	128,101	45.0	117
Inxuba Yethemba Local Municipality	EC131	Eastern Cape	Chris Hani	Cradock	B3 (small towns)	11,663.5	4,503.3	77,578	6.7	17
JB Marks Local Municipality	NW405	North West	Dr Kenneth Kaunda	Potchefstroom	B1 (secondary city)	6,398.0	2,470.3	212,670	33.2	86
Joe Morolong Local Municipality	NC451	Northern Cape	John Taolo Gaetsewe	Mothibistad	B4 (mostly rural)	20,179.8	7,791.5	125,420	6.2	16
Johannes Phumani Phungula Local Municipality	KZN434	KwaZulu-Natal	Harry Gwala	Ixopo	B4 (mostly rural)	1,669.7	644.7	133,032	79.7	206
Jozini Local Municipality	KZN272	KwaZulu-Natal	Umkhanyakude	Jozini	B4 (mostly rural)	3,438.3	1,327.5	199,153	57.9	150
Kagisano-Molopo Local Municipality	NW397	North West	Dr Ruth Segomotsi Mompati	Ganyesa	B4 (mostly rural)	23,827.2	9,199.7	112,130	4.7	12
Kai !Garib Local Municipality	NC082	Northern Cape	ZF Mgcawu	Kakamas	B3 (small towns)	26,236.3	10,129.9	85,104	3.2	8.3
Kamiesberg Local Municipality	NC064	Northern Cape	Namakwa	Garies	B3 (small towns)	14,208.4	5,485.9	15,130	1.1	2.8
Kannaland Local Municipality	WC041	Western Cape	Garden Route	Ladismith	B3 (small towns)	4,765.4	1,839.9	31,986	6.7	17
Kareeberg Local Municipality	NC074	Northern Cape	Pixley ka Seme	Carnarvon	B3 (small towns)	17,700.8	6,834.3	10,961	0.6	1.6
Karoo Hoogland Local Municipality	NC066	Northern Cape	Namakwa	Williston	B3 (small towns)	30,230.4	11,672.0	11,691	0.4	1.0
Kgatelopele Local Municipality	NC086	Northern Cape	ZF Mgcawu	Daniëlskuil	B3 (small towns)	2,478.4	956.9	19,854	8.0	21
Kgetlengrivier Local Municipality	NW374	North West	Bojanala	Koster	B3 (small towns)	3,973.1	1,534.0	54,759	13.8	36
Khâi-Ma Local Municipality	NC067	Northern Cape	Namakwa	Pofadder	B3 (small towns)	15,714.9	6,067.6	8,510	0.5	1.3
!Kheis Local Municipality	NC084	Northern Cape	ZF Mgcawu	Groblershoop	B3 (small towns)	11,102.4	4,286.7	21,954	2.0	5.2
King Sabata Dalindyebo Local Municipality	EC157	Eastern Cape	OR Tambo	Mthatha	B2 (large town)	3,018.9	1,165.6	476,558	157.9	409
Knysna Local Municipality	WC048	Western Cape	Garden Route	Knysna	B2 (large town)	1,108.8	428.1	96,055	86.6	224
Kopanong Local Municipality	FS162	Free State	Xhariep	Trompsburg	B3 (small towns)	15,648.0	6,041.7	51,832	3.3	8.5
Kou-Kamma Local Municipality	EC109	Eastern Cape	Sarah Baartman	Kareedouw	B3 (small towns)	3,641.8	1,406.1	36,487	10.0	26
Kouga Local Municipality	EC108	Eastern Cape	Sarah Baartman	Jeffreys Bay	B3 (small towns)	2,670.5	1,031.1	107,014	40.1	104
Kumkani Mhlontlo Local Municipality	EC156	Eastern Cape	OR Tambo	Qumbu	B4 (mostly rural)	2,880.3	1,112.1	186,391	64.7	168
KwaDukuza Local Municipality	KZN292	KwaZulu-Natal	iLembe	KwaDukuza	B2 (large town)	740.0	285.7	324,912	439.1	1,137
Laingsburg Local Municipality	WC051	Western Cape	Central Karoo	Laingsburg	B3 (small towns)	8,784.5	3,391.7	11,366	1.3	3.4
Langeberg Local Municipality	WC026	Western Cape	Cape Winelands	Ashton	B3 (small towns)	4,517.6	1,744.3	94,045	20.8	54
Lekwa Local Municipality	MP305	Mpumalanga	Gert Sibande	Standerton	B3 (small towns)	4,594.4	1,773.9	119,669	26.0	67
Lekwa-Teemane Local Municipality	NW396	North West	Dr Ruth Segomotsi Mompati	Christiana	B3 (small towns)	3,653.6	1,410.7	59,815	16.4	42
Lepelle-Nkumpi Local Municipality	LIM355	Limpopo	Capricorn	Chuniespoort	B4 (mostly rural)	3,484.3	1,345.3	284,404	81.6	211
Lephalale Local Municipality	LIM362	Limpopo	Waterberg	Lephalale	B3 (small towns)	13,793.5	5,325.7	125,198	9.1	24
Lesedi Local Municipality	GT423	Gauteng	Sedibeng	Heidelberg	B3 (small towns)	1,484.4	573.1	132,783	89.5	232
Letsemeng Local Municipality	FS161	Free State	Xhariep	Koffiefontein	B3 (small towns)	9,825.9	3,793.8	43,101	4.4	11
Madibeng Local Municipality	NW372	North West	Bojanala	Brits	B1 (secondary city)	3,720.1	1,436.3	522,566	140.5	364
Mafube Local Municipality	FS205	Free State	Fezile Dabi	Frankfort	B3 (small towns)	3,976.6	1,535.4	61,150	15.4	40
Magareng Local Municipality	NC093	Northern Cape	Frances Baard	Warrenton	B3 (small towns)	1,546.4	597.1	26,816	17.3	45
Mahikeng Local Municipality	NW383	North West	Ngaka Modiri Molema	Mahikeng	B2 (large town)	3,645.9	1,407.7	354,504	97.2	252
Makana Local Municipality	EC104	Eastern Cape	Sarah Baartman	Grahamstown	B2 (large town)	4,376.4	1,689.7	97,815	22.4	58
Makhado Local Municipality	LIM344	Limpopo	Vhembe	Louis Trichardt	B4 (mostly rural)	7,605.1	2,936.3	502,452	66.1	171
Makhuduthamaga Local Municipality	LIM473	Limpopo	Sekhukhune	Jane Furse	B4 (mostly rural)	2,109.6	814.5	340,328	161.3	418
Maluti-a-Phofung Local Municipality	FS194	Free State	Thabo Mofutsanyana	Phuthaditjhaba	B3 (small towns)	4,337.7	1,674.8	398,459	91.9	238
Mamusa Local Municipality	NW393	North West	Dr Ruth Segomotsi Mompati	Schweizer-Reneke	B3 (small towns)	3,603.3	1,391.2	70,483	19.6	51
Mandeni Local Municipality	KZN291	KwaZulu-Natal	iLembe	Mandeni	B4 (mostly rural)	554.8	214.2	180,939	326.1	845
Mangaung Metropolitan Municipality	MAN	Free State		Bloemfontein	A (metro)	9,886.3	3,817.1	811,431	82.1	213
Mantsopa Local Municipality	FS196	Free State	Thabo Mofutsanyana	Ladybrand	B3 (small towns)	4,290.6	1,656.6	55,897	13.0	34
Maphumulo Local Municipality	KZN294	KwaZulu-Natal	iLembe	Maphumulo	B4 (mostly rural)	895.9	345.9	110,983	123.9	321
Maquassi Hills Local Municipality	NW404	North West	Dr Kenneth Kaunda	Wolmaransstad	B3 (small towns)	4,670.6	1,803.3	90,302	19.3	50
Maruleng Local Municipality	LIM335	Limpopo	Mopani	Hoedspruit	B4 (mostly rural)	3,562.6	1,375.5	128,137	36.0	93
Masilonyana Local Municipality	FS181	Free State	Lejweleputswa	Theunissen	B3 (small towns)	6,617.8	2,555.1	63,800	9.6	25
Matatiele Local Municipality	EC441	Eastern Cape	Alfred Nzo	Matatiele	B3 (small towns)	4,352.3	1,680.4	225,562	51.8	134
Matjhabeng Local Municipality	FS184	Free State	Lejweleputswa	Welkom	B1 (secondary city)	5,690.4	2,197.1	439,034	77.2	200
Matzikama Local Municipality	WC011	Western Cape	West Coast	Vredendal	B3 (small towns)	12,981.4	5,012.1	69,043	5.3	14
Mbhashe Local Municipality	EC121	Eastern Cape	Amathole	Dutywa	B4 (mostly rural)	3,302.5	1,275.1	240,020	72.7	188
Mbombela Local Municipality	MP326	Mpumalanga	Ehlanzeni	Nelspruit	B1 (secondary city)	7,151.6	2,761.2	809,674	113.2	293
Merafong City Local Municipality	GT484	Gauteng	West Rand	Carletonville	B2 (large town)	1,630.0	629.3	225,476	138.3	358
Metsimaholo Local Municipality	FS204	Free State	Fezile Dabi	Sasolburg	B2 (large town)	1,717.1	663.0	158,391	92.2	239
Midvaal Local Municipality	GT422	Gauteng	Sedibeng	Meyerton	B2 (large town)	1,722.7	665.1	112,254	65.2	169
Mkhambathini Local Municipality	KZN226	KwaZulu-Natal	uMgungundlovu	Camperdown	B3 (small towns)	868.5	335.3	61,660	71.0	184
Mkhondo Local Municipality	MP303	Mpumalanga	Gert Sibande	Piet Retief	B3 (small towns)	4,900.5	1,892.1	255,411	52.1	135
Mnquma Local Municipality	EC122	Eastern Cape	Amathole	Gcuwa	B4 (mostly rural)	3,137.3	1,211.3	232,993	74.3	192
Modimolle–Mookgophong Local Municipality	LIM368	Limpopo	Waterberg	Modimolle	B3 (small towns)	10,367.5	4,002.9	130,113	12.6	33
Mogalakwena Local Municipality	LIM367	Limpopo	Waterberg	Mokopane	B2 (large town)	6,156.2	2,376.9	378,198	61.4	159
Mogale City Local Municipality	GT481	Gauteng	West Rand	Krugersdorp	B1 (secondary city)	1,344.7	519.2	438,217	325.9	844
Mohokare Local Municipality	FS163	Free State	Xhariep	Zastron	B3 (small towns)	8,775.8	3,388.4	36,968	4.2	11
Molemole Local Municipality	LIM353	Limpopo	Capricorn	Dendron	B4 (mostly rural)	3,627.6	1,400.6	127,130	35.0	91
Moqhaka Local Municipality	FS201	Free State	Fezile Dabi	Kroonstad	B2 (large town)	7,924.6	3,059.7	155,410	19.6	51
Moretele Local Municipality	NW371	North West	Bojanala	Makapanstad	B4 (mostly rural)	1,497.9	578.3	219,120	146.3	379
Moses Kotane Local Municipality	NW375	North West	Bojanala	Mogwase	B4 (mostly rural)	5,726.2	2,210.9	265,668	46.4	120
Mossel Bay Local Municipality	WC043	Western Cape	Garden Route	Mossel Bay	B2 (large town)	2,001.0	772.6	140,075	70.0	181
Mpofana Local Municipality	KZN223	KwaZulu-Natal	uMgungundlovu	Mooi River	B3 (small towns)	1,755.2	677.7	33,382	19.0	49
Msinga Local Municipality	KZN244	KwaZulu-Natal	Umzinyathi	Tugela Ferry	B4 (mostly rural)	2,375.2	917.1	206,001	86.7	225
Msukaligwa Local Municipality	MP302	Mpumalanga	Gert Sibande	Ermelo	B2 (large town)	6,003.4	2,317.9	199,314	33.2	86
Msunduzi Local Municipality	KZN225	KwaZulu-Natal	uMgungundlovu	Pietermaritzburg	B1 (secondary city)	751.1	290.0	817,725	1,088.7	2,820
Mthonjaneni Local Municipality	KZN285	KwaZulu-Natal	King Cetshwayo	Melmoth	B3 (small towns)	1,638.6	632.7	99,289	60.6	157
Mtubatuba Local Municipality	KZN275	KwaZulu-Natal	Umkhanyakude	Mtubatuba	B3 (small towns)	1,969.8	760.5	215,869	109.6	284
Musina Local Municipality	LIM341	Limpopo	Vhembe	Musina	B3 (small towns)	10,346.6	3,994.8	130,899	12.7	33
Nala Local Municipality	FS185	Free State	Lejweleputswa	Bothaville	B3 (small towns)	4,128.8	1,594.1	90,561	21.9	57
Naledi Local Municipality	NW392	North West	Dr Ruth Segomotsi Mompati	Vryburg	B3 (small towns)	7,032.0	2,715.1	63,755	9.1	24
Nama Khoi Local Municipality	NC062	Northern Cape	Namakwa	Springbok	B3 (small towns)	17,990.4	6,946.1	67,089	3.7	9.6
Ndlambe Local Municipality	EC105	Eastern Cape	Sarah Baartman	Port Alfred	B3 (small towns)	1,839.9	710.4	87,797	47.7	124
Ndwedwe Local Municipality	KZN293	KwaZulu-Natal	iLembe	Ndwedwe	B4 (mostly rural)	1,078.6	416.4	165,826	153.7	398
Nelson Mandela Bay Metropolitan Municipality	NMA	Eastern Cape		Port Elizabeth	A (metro)	1,957.0	755.6	1,190,496	608.3	1,575
Newcastle Local Municipality	KZN252	KwaZulu-Natal	Amajuba	Newcastle	B1 (secondary city)	1,855.8	716.5	507,710	273.6	709
Ngqushwa Local Municipality	EC126	Eastern Cape	Amathole	Peddie	B4 (mostly rural)	2,112.5	815.6	68,300	32.3	84
Ngwathe Local Municipality	FS203	Free State	Fezile Dabi	Parys	B3 (small towns)	7,055.0	2,724.0	134,962	19.1	49
Nkandla Local Municipality	KZN286	KwaZulu-Natal	King Cetshwayo	Nkandla	B4 (mostly rural)	1,827.6	705.6	108,896	59.6	154
Nketoana Local Municipality	FS193	Free State	Thabo Mofutsanyana	Reitz	B3 (small towns)	5,604.5	2,163.9	66,488	11.9	31
Nkomazi Local Municipality	MP324	Mpumalanga	Ehlanzeni	Malalane	B4 (mostly rural)	4,785.3	1,847.6	591,928	123.7	320
Nongoma Local Municipality	KZN265	KwaZulu-Natal	Zululand	Nongoma	B4 (mostly rural)	2,182.1	842.5	225,278	103.2	267
Nqutu Local Municipality	KZN242	KwaZulu-Natal	Umzinyathi	Nquthu	B4 (mostly rural)	1,962.3	757.6	201,133	102.5	265
Ntabankulu Local Municipality	EC444	Eastern Cape	Alfred Nzo	Ntabankulu	B4 (mostly rural)	1,384.5	534.6	146,423	105.8	274
Nyandeni Local Municipality	EC155	Eastern Cape	OR Tambo	Libode	B4 (mostly rural)	2,474.0	955.2	304,856	123.2	319
Okhahlamba Local Municipality	KZN235	KwaZulu-Natal	Uthukela	Bergville	B4 (mostly rural)	3,971.0	1,533.2	143,132	36.0	93
Oudtshoorn Local Municipality	WC045	Western Cape	Garden Route	Oudtshoorn	B2 (large town)	3,540.4	1,367.0	138,257	39.1	101
Overstrand Local Municipality	WC032	Western Cape	Overberg	Hermanus	B2 (large town)	1,674.6	646.6	132,495	79.1	205
Phokwane Local Municipality	NC094	Northern Cape	Frances Baard	Hartswater	B3 (small towns)	828.1	319.7	80,481	97.2	252
Phumelela Local Municipality	FS195	Free State	Thabo Mofutsanyana	Vrede	B3 (small towns)	8,197.2	3,165.0	52,224	6.4	17
Pixley ka Seme Local Municipality	MP304	Mpumalanga	Gert Sibande	Volksrust	B3 (small towns)	5,227.2	2,018.2	115,304	22.1	57
Polokwane Local Municipality	LIM354	Limpopo	Capricorn	Polokwane	B1 (secondary city)	5,053.7	1,951.2	843,459	166.9	432
Port St Johns Local Municipality	EC154	Eastern Cape	OR Tambo	Port St Johns	B4 (mostly rural)	1,291.2	498.5	179,325	138.9	360
Prince Albert Local Municipality	WC052	Western Cape	Central Karoo	Prince Albert	B3 (small towns)	8,152.9	3,147.9	17,836	2.2	5.7
Ramotshere Moiloa Local Municipality	NW385	North West	Ngaka Modiri Molema	Zeerust	B3 (small towns)	7,322.8	2,827.3	161,605	22.1	57
Rand West City Local Municipality	GT485	Gauteng	West Rand	Randfontein	B2 (large town)	1,114.7	430.4	334,773	300.3	778
Ratlou Local Municipality	NW381	North West	Ngaka Modiri Molema	Setlagole	B4 (mostly rural)	4,883.6	1,885.6	128,766	26.4	68
Ray Nkonyeni Local Municipality	KZN216	KwaZulu-Natal	Ugu	Port Shepstone	B2 (large town)	1,487.1	574.2	362,134	243.5	631
Raymond Mhlaba Local Municipality	EC129	Eastern Cape	Amathole	Alice	B3 (small towns)	6,357.3	2,454.6	178,594	28.1	73
Renosterberg Local Municipality	NC075	Northern Cape	Pixley ka Seme	Petrusville	B3 (small towns)	5,529.3	2,134.9	10,843	2.0	5.2
Richmond Local Municipality	KZN227	KwaZulu-Natal	uMgungundlovu	Richmond	B4 (mostly rural)	1,231.4	475.4	62,754	51.0	132
Richtersveld Local Municipality	NC061	Northern Cape	Namakwa	Port Nolloth	B3 (small towns)	9,607.7	3,709.6	24,235	2.5	6.5
Rustenburg Local Municipality	NW373	North West	Bojanala	Rustenburg	B1 (secondary city)	3,416.1	1,319.0	562,315	164.6	426
Sakhisizwe Local Municipality	EC138	Eastern Cape	Chris Hani	Cala	B3 (small towns)	2,345.1	905.4	63,981	27.3	71
Saldanha Bay Local Municipality	WC014	Western Cape	West Coast	Vredenburg	B2 (large town)	2,015.4	778.2	154,635	76.7	199
Senqu Local Municipality	EC142	Eastern Cape	Joe Gqabi	Lady Grey	B4 (mostly rural)	7,329.4	2,829.9	147,073	20.1	52
Setsoto Local Municipality	FS191	Free State	Thabo Mofutsanyana	Ficksburg	B3 (small towns)	5,431.2	2,097.0	127,918	23.6	61
Siyancuma Local Municipality	NC078	Northern Cape	Pixley ka Seme	Douglas	B3 (small towns)	16,587.4	6,404.4	53,165	3.2	8.3
Siyathemba Local Municipality	NC077	Northern Cape	Pixley ka Seme	Prieska	B3 (small towns)	14,704.0	5,677.2	27,102	1.8	4.7
Sol Plaatje Local Municipality	NC091	Northern Cape	Frances Baard	Kimberley	B1 (secondary city)	3,311.6	1,278.6	270,078	81.6	211
Stellenbosch Local Municipality	WC024	Western Cape	Cape Winelands	Stellenbosch	B1 (secondary city)	835.6	322.6	175,411	209.9	544
Steve Tshwete Local Municipality	MP313	Mpumalanga	Nkangala	Middelburg	B1 (secondary city)	3,976.5	1,535.3	242,031	60.9	158
Sundays River Valley Local Municipality	EC106	Eastern Cape	Sarah Baartman	Kirkwood	B3 (small towns)	5,995.2	2,314.8	53,256	8.9	23
Swartland Local Municipality	WC015	Western Cape	West Coast	Malmesbury	B3 (small towns)	3,708.0	1,431.7	148,331	40.0	104
Swellendam Local Municipality	WC034	Western Cape	Overberg	Swellendam	B3 (small towns)	3,835.1	1,480.7	47,114	12.3	32
Thaba Chweu Local Municipality	MP321	Mpumalanga	Ehlanzeni	Lydenburg	B3 (small towns)	5,710.5	2,204.8	118,474	20.7	54
Thabazimbi Local Municipality	LIM361	Limpopo	Waterberg	Thabazimbi	B3 (small towns)	11,190.0	4,320.5	65,047	5.8	15
Theewaterskloof Local Municipality	WC031	Western Cape	Overberg	Caledon	B3 (small towns)	3,260.6	1,258.9	139,563	42.8	111
Thembelihle Local Municipality	NC076	Northern Cape	Pixley ka Seme	Hopetown	B3 (small towns)	8,023.1	3,097.7	22,542	2.8	7.3
Thembisile Hani Local Municipality	MP315	Mpumalanga	Nkangala	eMpumalanga	B4 (mostly rural)	2,384.4	920.6	431,248	180.9	469
Thulamela Local Municipality	LIM343	Limpopo	Vhembe	Thohoyandou	B4 (mostly rural)	2,641.7	1,020.0	575,929	218.0	565
Tokologo Local Municipality	FS182	Free State	Lejweleputswa	Boshof	B3 (small towns)	9,316.5	3,597.1	29,455	3.2	8.3
Tsantsabane Local Municipality	NC085	Northern Cape	ZF Mgcawu	Postmasburg	B3 (small towns)	18,289.3	7,061.5	30,969	1.7	4.4
Tswaing Local Municipality	NW382	North West	Ngaka Modiri Molema	Delareyville	B3 (small towns)	5,885.3	2,272.3	128,672	21.9	57
Tswelopele Local Municipality	FS183	Free State	Lejweleputswa	Bultfontein	B3 (small towns)	6,533.5	2,522.6	56,896	8.7	23
Ubuntu Local Municipality	NC071	Northern Cape	Pixley ka Seme	Victoria West	B3 (small towns)	20,393.2	7,873.9	15,836	0.8	2.1
Ulundi Local Municipality	KZN266	KwaZulu-Natal	Zululand	Ulundi	B4 (mostly rural)	3,250.6	1,255.1	221,977	68.3	177
Umdoni Local Municipality	KZN212	KwaZulu-Natal	Ugu	Scottburgh	B2 (large town)	989.8	382.2	156,443	158.1	409
uMfolozi Local Municipality	KZN281	KwaZulu-Natal	King Cetshwayo	KwaMbonambi	B4 (mostly rural)	1,300.3	502.0	159,668	122.8	318
uMhlabuyalingana Local Municipality	KZN271	KwaZulu-Natal	Umkhanyakude	Kwangwanase	B4 (mostly rural)	4,977.1	1,921.7	191,660	38.5	100
uMhlathuze Local Municipality	KZN282	KwaZulu-Natal	King Cetshwayo	Richards Bay	B1 (secondary city)	1,232.9	476.0	412,075	334.2	866
uMlalazi Local Municipality	KZN284	KwaZulu-Natal	King Cetshwayo	Eshowe	B4 (mostly rural)	2,213.9	854.8	241,416	109.0	282
uMngeni Local Municipality	KZN222	KwaZulu-Natal	uMgungundlovu	Howick	B2 (large town)	1,520.8	587.2	105,069	69.1	179
uMshwathi Local Municipality	KZN221	KwaZulu-Natal	uMgungundlovu	Wartburg	B4 (mostly rural)	1,865.9	720.4	118,478	63.5	164
Umsobomvu Local Municipality	NC072	Northern Cape	Pixley ka Seme	Colesberg	B3 (small towns)	6,813.4	2,630.7	29,555	4.3	11
uMuziwabantu Local Municipality	KZN214	KwaZulu-Natal	Ugu	Harding	B3 (small towns)	1,089.3	420.6	115,780	106.3	275
Umvoti Local Municipality	KZN245	KwaZulu-Natal	Umzinyathi	Greytown	B3 (small towns)	2,704.7	1,044.3	142,042	52.5	136
Umzimkhulu Local Municipality	KZN435	KwaZulu-Natal	Harry Gwala	Umzimkhulu	B4 (mostly rural)	2,435.6	940.4	220,620	90.6	235
Umzimvubu Local Municipality	EC442	Eastern Cape	Alfred Nzo	Mount Frere	B4 (mostly rural)	2,578.9	995.7	214,477	83.2	215
Umzumbe Local Municipality	KZN213	KwaZulu-Natal	Ugu	Mtwalume	B4 (mostly rural)	1,223.9	472.6	139,045	113.6	294
uPhongolo Local Municipality	KZN262	KwaZulu-Natal	Zululand	Pongola	B4 (mostly rural)	3,110.1	1,200.8	151,541	48.7	126
Victor Khanye Local Municipality	MP311	Mpumalanga	Nkangala	Delmas	B3 (small towns)	1,567.8	605.3	106,149	67.7	175
Walter Sisulu Local Municipality	EC145	Eastern Cape	Joe Gqabi	Burgersdorp	B3 (small towns)	13,268.9	5,123.2	104,213	7.9	20
Winnie Madikizela-Mandela Local Municipality	EC443	Eastern Cape	Alfred Nzo	Bizana	B4 (mostly rural)	2,415.5	932.6	350,000	144.9	375
Witzenberg Local Municipality	WC022	Western Cape	Cape Winelands	Ceres	B3 (small towns)	10,753.2	4,151.8	103,765	9.6	25

== Former municipalities ==
These municipalities have been dissolved since the current system of local government was established in 2000.

Name	Code	Province	Dissolved	Fate
Camdeboo Local Municipality	EC101	Eastern Cape	3 August 2016	Merged to create Dr Beyers Naudé Local Municipality
Ikwezi Local Municipality	EC103	Eastern Cape	3 August 2016	Merged to create Dr Beyers Naudé Local Municipality
Baviaans Local Municipality	EC107	Eastern Cape	3 August 2016	Merged to create Dr Beyers Naudé Local Municipality
Nkonkobe Local Municipality	EC127	Eastern Cape	3 August 2016	Merged to create Raymond Mhlaba Local Municipality
Nxuba Local Municipality	EC128	Eastern Cape	3 August 2016	Merged to create Raymond Mhlaba Local Municipality
Tsolwana Local Municipality	EC132	Eastern Cape	3 August 2016	Merged to create Enoch Mgijima Local Municipality
Inkwanca Local Municipality	EC133	Eastern Cape	3 August 2016	Merged to create Enoch Mgijima Local Municipality
Lukhanji Local Municipality	EC134	Eastern Cape	3 August 2016	Merged to create Enoch Mgijima Local Municipality
Maletswai Local Municipality	EC143	Eastern Cape	3 August 2016	Merged to create Walter Sisulu Local Municipality
Gariep Local Municipality	EC144	Eastern Cape	3 August 2016	Merged to create Walter Sisulu Local Municipality
Motheo District Municipality	DC17	Free State	18 May 2011	Part became Mangaung Metropolitan Municipality, other parts annexed by Xhariep and Thabo Mofutsanyana District Municipalities
Naledi Local Municipality	FS164	Free State	3 August 2016	Annexed by Mangaung Metropolitan Municipality
Metsweding District Municipality	DC46	Gauteng	18 May 2011	Annexed by City of Tshwane Metropolitan Municipality
Nokeng tsa Taemane Local Municipality	GT461	Gauteng	18 May 2011	Annexed by City of Tshwane Metropolitan Municipality
Kungwini Local Municipality	GT462	Gauteng	18 May 2011	Annexed by City of Tshwane Metropolitan Municipality
Randfontein Local Municipality	GT482	Gauteng	3 August 2016	Merged to create Rand West City Local Municipality
Westonaria Local Municipality	GT483	Gauteng	3 August 2016	Merged to create Rand West City Local Municipality
Ezinqoleni Local Municipality	KZN215	KwaZulu-Natal	3 August 2016	Merged to create Ray Nkonyeni Local Municipality
Hibiscus Coast Local Municipality	KZN216	KwaZulu-Natal	3 August 2016	Merged to create Ray Nkonyeni Local Municipality
Vulamehlo Local Municipality	KZN211	KwaZulu-Natal	3 August 2016	Annexed by eThekwini Metropolitan Municipality and Umdoni Local Municipality
Emnambithi/Ladysmith Local Municipality	KZN232	KwaZulu-Natal	3 August 2016	Merged to create Alfred Duma Local Municipality
Indaka Local Municipality	KZN233	KwaZulu-Natal	3 August 2016	Merged to create Alfred Duma Local Municipality
Umtshezi Local Municipality	KZN234	KwaZulu-Natal	3 August 2016	Merged to create Inkosi Langalibalele Local Municipality
Imbabazane Local Municipality	KZN236	KwaZulu-Natal	3 August 2016	Merged to create Inkosi Langalibalele Local Municipality
Big 5 False Bay Local Municipality	KZN273	KwaZulu-Natal	3 August 2016	Merged to create Big Five Hlabisa Local Municipality
Hlabisa Local Municipality	KZN274	KwaZulu-Natal	3 August 2016	Merged to create Big Five Hlabisa Local Municipality
Ntambanana Local Municipality	KZN283	KwaZulu-Natal	3 August 2016	Annexed by Mthonjaneni, uMfolozi and uMhlathuze Local Municipalities
Ingwe Local Municipality	KZN431	KwaZulu-Natal	3 August 2016	Merged to create Dr Nkosazana Dlamini-Zuma Local Municipality
Kwa Sani Local Municipality	KZN432	KwaZulu-Natal	3 August 2016	Merged to create Dr Nkosazana Dlamini-Zuma Local Municipality
Bohlabela District Municipality	CBDC4	Mpumalanga/Limpopo	1 March 2006	Annexed by Ehlanzeni and Mopani District Municipalities
Mutale Local Municipality	LIM342	Limpopo	3 August 2016	Annexed by Musina and Thulamela Local Municipalities
Aganang Local Municipality	LIM352	Limpopo	3 August 2016	Annexed by Blouberg, Molemole and Polokwane Local Municipalities
Mookgopong Local Municipality	LIM364	Limpopo	3 August 2016	Merged to create Modimolle–Mookgophong Local Municipality
Modimolle Local Municipality	LIM365	Limpopo	3 August 2016	Merged to create Modimolle–Mookgophong Local Municipality
Fetakgomo Local Municipality	LIM474	Limpopo	3 August 2016	Merged to create Fetakgomo Tubatse Local Municipality
Greater Tubatse Local Municipality	LIM475	Limpopo	3 August 2016	Merged to create Fetakgomo Tubatse Local Municipality
Umjindi Local Municipality	MP323	Mpumalanga	3 August 2016	Annexed by Mbombela Local Municipality
Kagisano Local Municipality	NW391	North West	18 May 2011	Merged to create Kagisano-Molopo Local Municipality
Molopo Local Municipality	NW395	North West	18 May 2011	Merged to create Kagisano-Molopo Local Municipality
Ventersdorp Local Municipality	NW401	North West	3 August 2016	Merged to create JB Marks Local Municipality
Tlokwe Local Municipality	NW402	North West	3 August 2016	Merged to create JB Marks Local Municipality
Mier Local Municipality	NC081	Northern Cape	3 August 2016	Merged to create Dawid Kruiper Local Municipality
//Khara Hais Local Municipality	NC083	Northern Cape	3 August 2016	Merged to create Dawid Kruiper Local Municipality

== By province ==
The lists linked below also include maps showing the locations of the municipalities.

- List of municipalities in the Eastern Cape
- List of municipalities in the Free State
- List of municipalities in Gauteng
- List of municipalities in KwaZulu-Natal
- List of municipalities in Limpopo
- List of municipalities in Mpumalanga
- List of municipalities in the North West
- List of municipalities in the Northern Cape
- List of municipalities in the Western Cape

== See also ==
- List of French place names in South Africa
