= Ntambanana Local Municipality elections =

The Ntambanana Local Municipality was a local municipality within the uThungulu District of KwaZulu-Natal in South Africa. In 2016 the municipality was dissolved and its territory divided between Mthonjaneni Local Municipality, uMhlathuze Local Municipality and uMfolozi Local Municipality.

== Results ==
The following table shows the composition of the council after past elections.

Event	ANC	IFP	NDC	NFP	Other	Total
2000 election	2	13	-	-	-	15
2006 election	3	11	1	-	0	15
2011 election	7	6	-	3	0	16

== December 2000 election ==
The following table shows the results of the 2000 election.

Party	Ward			List			Total seats
Party	Votes	%	Seats	Votes	%	Seats	Total seats
Inkatha Freedom Party	11,486	85.24	8	11,483	85.15	5	13
African National Congress	1,989	14.76	0	2,003	14.85	2	2
Total	13,475	100.00	8	13,486	100.00	7	15
Valid votes	13,475	97.79		13,486	97.85		
Invalid/blank votes	305	2.21		296	2.15		
Total votes	13,780	100.00		13,782	100.00		
Registered voters/turnout	26,890	51.25		26,890	51.25		

== March 2006 election ==
The following table shows the results of the 2006 election.

Party	Ward			List			Total seats
Party	Votes	%	Seats	Votes	%	Seats	Total seats
Inkatha Freedom Party	11,276	70.82	7	11,187	69.83	4	11
African National Congress	3,696	23.21	1	3,787	23.64	2	3
National Democratic Convention	535	3.36	0	654	4.08	1	1
Democratic Alliance	414	2.60	0	392	2.45	0	0
Total	15,921	100.00	8	16,020	100.00	7	15
Valid votes	15,921	97.99		16,020	98.03		
Invalid/blank votes	326	2.01		322	1.97		
Total votes	16,247	100.00		16,342	100.00		
Registered voters/turnout	29,422	55.22		29,422	55.54		

== May 2011 election ==
The following table shows the results of the 2011 election.

Party	Ward			List			Total seats
Party	Votes	%	Seats	Votes	%	Seats	Total seats
African National Congress	8,657	42.13	4	9,297	45.30	3	7
Inkatha Freedom Party	7,468	36.34	3	7,423	36.17	3	6
National Freedom Party	3,840	18.69	1	3,802	18.53	2	3
Independent candidates	584	2.84	0				0
Total	20,549	100.00	8	20,522	100.00	8	16
Valid votes	20,549	98.25		20,522	97.80		
Invalid/blank votes	366	1.75		461	2.20		
Total votes	20,915	100.00		20,983	100.00		
Registered voters/turnout	32,449	64.45		32,449	64.66		
