= Heatonville =

- Location within KwaZulu-Natal Location within South Africa
- Coordinates: 28.659°S 31.785°E
- Country: South Africa
- Province: KwaZulu-Natal
- District: King Cetshwayo
- Municipality: uMhlathuze
- Time zone: UTC+2 (SAST)
- PO box: 3881

Heatonville is a settlement approximately 13 km north-west of Empangeni. It was named after George Heaton Nicholls, member of Parliament for Zululand from 1920, later also Administrator of Natal and High Commissioner for South Africa from 1944.

A 1959 archaeological paper places prehistoric activity in the vicinity of Heatonville and Lower Umfolozi.
