= UMfolozi Local Municipality elections =

Local elections in KwaZulu-Natal, South Africa

The uMfolozi Local Municipality council consists of thirty-five members elected by mixed-member proportional representation. Eighteen councillors are elected by first-past-the-post voting in eighteen wards, while the remaining seventeen are chosen from party lists so that the total number of party representatives is proportional to the number of votes received.

The municipality was enlarged at the time of the South African municipal election, 2016 when part of the disbanded Ntambanana Local Municipality was merged into it.

In the election of 4 November 2026 the Inkatha Freedom Party (IFP) lost its majority, but remained the largest party on the council, with sixteen seats.

== Results ==
The following table shows the composition of the council after past elections.

Event	ANC	DA	EFF	IFP	NFP	MKP	Other	Total
2000 election	6	1	—	18	—	—	—	25
2006 election	9	1	—	14	—	—	1	25
2011 election	17	0	—	10	3	—	0	30
2016 election	17	0	1	15	—	—	0	33
2021 election	13	0	3	18	1	—	0	35
2026 election	6	1	1	16	0	11	0	35

== December 2000 election ==
The following table shows the results of the 2000 election.

Party	Ward			List			Total seats
Party	Votes	%	Seats	Votes	%	Seats	Total seats
Inkatha Freedom Party	14,630	73.65	13	14,331	72.26	5	18
African National Congress	5,080	25.58	0	4,923	24.82	6	6
Democratic Alliance	153	0.77	0	579	2.92	1	1
Total	19,863	100.00	13	19,833	100.00	12	25
Valid votes	19,863	96.93		19,833	96.94		
Invalid/blank votes	629	3.07		625	3.06		
Total votes	20,492	100.00		20,458	100.00		
Registered voters/turnout	42,649	48.05		42,649	47.97		

== March 2006 election ==
The following table shows the results of the 2006 election.

Party	Ward			List			Total seats
Party	Votes	%	Seats	Votes	%	Seats	Total seats
Inkatha Freedom Party	15,280	56.66	9	14,990	55.75	5	14
African National Congress	10,021	37.16	4	10,242	38.09	5	9
National Democratic Convention	756	2.80	0	835	3.11	1	1
Democratic Alliance	463	1.72	0	540	2.01	1	1
African Christian Democratic Party	292	1.08	0	281	1.05	0	0
Independent candidates	156	0.58	0				0
Total	26,968	100.00	13	26,888	100.00	12	25
Valid votes	26,968	98.43		26,888	98.27		
Invalid/blank votes	431	1.57		473	1.73		
Total votes	27,399	100.00		27,361	100.00		
Registered voters/turnout	47,494	57.69		47,494	57.61		

== May 2011 election ==
The following table shows the results of the 2011 election.

Party	Ward			List			Total seats
Party	Votes	%	Seats	Votes	%	Seats	Total seats
African National Congress	21,311	53.76	10	22,081	55.84	7	17
Inkatha Freedom Party	12,894	32.53	5	12,400	31.36	5	10
National Freedom Party	4,406	11.12	0	4,417	11.17	3	3
Democratic Alliance	495	1.25	0	648	1.64	0	0
Independent candidates	533	1.34	0				0
Total	39,639	100.00	15	39,546	100.00	15	30
Valid votes	39,639	98.03		39,546	98.20		
Invalid/blank votes	798	1.97		723	1.80		
Total votes	40,437	100.00		40,269	100.00		
Registered voters/turnout	59,141	68.37		59,141	68.09		

== August 2016 election ==
The following table shows the results of the 2016 election.

Party	Ward			List			Total seats
Party	Votes	%	Seats	Votes	%	Seats	Total seats
African National Congress	22,501	47.34	8	24,374	51.36	9	17
Inkatha Freedom Party	20,976	44.13	9	20,747	43.72	6	15
Economic Freedom Fighters	1,518	3.19	0	1,491	3.14	1	1
Independent candidates	1,826	3.84	0				0
Democratic Alliance	713	1.50	0	847	1.78	0	0
Total	47,534	100.00	17	47,459	100.00	16	33
Valid votes	47,534	98.35		47,459	98.37		
Invalid/blank votes	797	1.65		787	1.63		
Total votes	48,331	100.00		48,246	100.00		
Registered voters/turnout	74,341	65.01		74,341	64.90		

== November 2021 election ==
The following table shows the results of the 2021 election.

Party	Ward			List			Total seats
Party	Votes	%	Seats	Votes	%	Seats	Total seats
Inkatha Freedom Party	18,884	48.83	14	19,572	50.57	4	18
African National Congress	14,622	37.81	4	14,230	36.77	9	13
Economic Freedom Fighters	3,223	8.33	0	3,359	8.68	3	3
Independent candidates	632	1.63	0				0
National Freedom Party	292	0.76	0	304	0.79	1	1
Democratic Alliance	303	0.78	0	272	0.70	0	0
African Independent Congress	145	0.37	0	375	0.97	0	0
Abantu Batho Congress	170	0.44	0	161	0.42	0	0
African People's Movement	109	0.28	0	125	0.32	0	0
African Christian Democratic Party	100	0.26	0	93	0.24	0	0
South Africa Vuka Movement	87	0.22	0	69	0.18	0	0
African Mantungwa Community	53	0.14	0	53	0.14	0	0
African Transformation Movement	23	0.06	0	53	0.14	0	0
United Christian Democratic Party	31	0.08	0	34	0.09	0	0
Total	38,674	100.00	18	38,700	100.00	17	35
Valid votes	38,674	98.35		38,700	98.35		
Invalid/blank votes	647	1.65		648	1.65		
Total votes	39,321	100.00		39,348	100.00		
Registered voters/turnout	74,081	53.08		74,081	53.11		

=== By-elections from November 2021 ===
The following by-elections were held to fill vacant ward seats in the period from the election in November 2021.

Date	Ward	Party of the previous councillor	Party of the newly elected councillor
3 Aug 2022	52801003	Inkatha Freedom Party	Inkatha Freedom Party
17 Dec 2025	17	Inkatha Freedom Party	Inkatha Freedom Party

== November 2026 election ==
The following table shows the results of the 2026 election.

Party	Ward			List			Total seats
Party	Votes	%	Seats	Votes	%	Seats	Total seats
Inkatha Freedom Party	20,654	44.97	12	20,635	45.02	4	16
uMkhonto weSizwe Party	14,432	31.43	4	15,302	33.38	7	11
African National Congress	8,116	17.67	2	6,975	15.22	4	6
Economic Freedom Fighters	851	1.85	0	820	1.79	1	1
Democratic Alliance	538	1.17	0	619	1.35	1	1
Independent Alliance	414	0.90	0	376	0.82	0	0
Afrika Mayibuye Movement	262	0.57	0	263	0.57	0	0
Service Delivery Party	151	0.33	0	205	0.45	0	0
South African Communist Party	120	0.26	0	142	0.31	0	0
National Freedom Party	99	0.22	0	161	0.35	0	0
African Movement Congress	98	0.21	0	70	0.15	0	0
African Christian Democratic Party	66	0.14	0	74	0.16	0	0
United Christian Democratic Party	47	0.10	0	58	0.13	0	0
African Transformation Movement	28	0.06	0	69	0.15	0	0
African Economic Freedom	49	0.11	0	36	0.08	0	0
Umkhumbi Wesizwe Organisation				32	0.07	0	0
Total	45,925	100.00	18	45,837	100.00	17	35
Valid votes	45,925	98.62		45,837	98.51		
Invalid/blank votes	644	1.38		691	1.49		
Total votes	46,569	100.00		46,528	100.00		
Registered voters/turnout	81,079	57.44		81,079	57.39		
