= Mbonambi =

Mbonambi may refer to

- uMfolozi Local Municipality (formerly Mbonambi) in South Africa
- Kwambonambi, a town in South Africa
- Bongi Mbonambi (born 1991), South African rugby union footballer
