= Nkandla, KwaZulu-Natal =

Nkandla
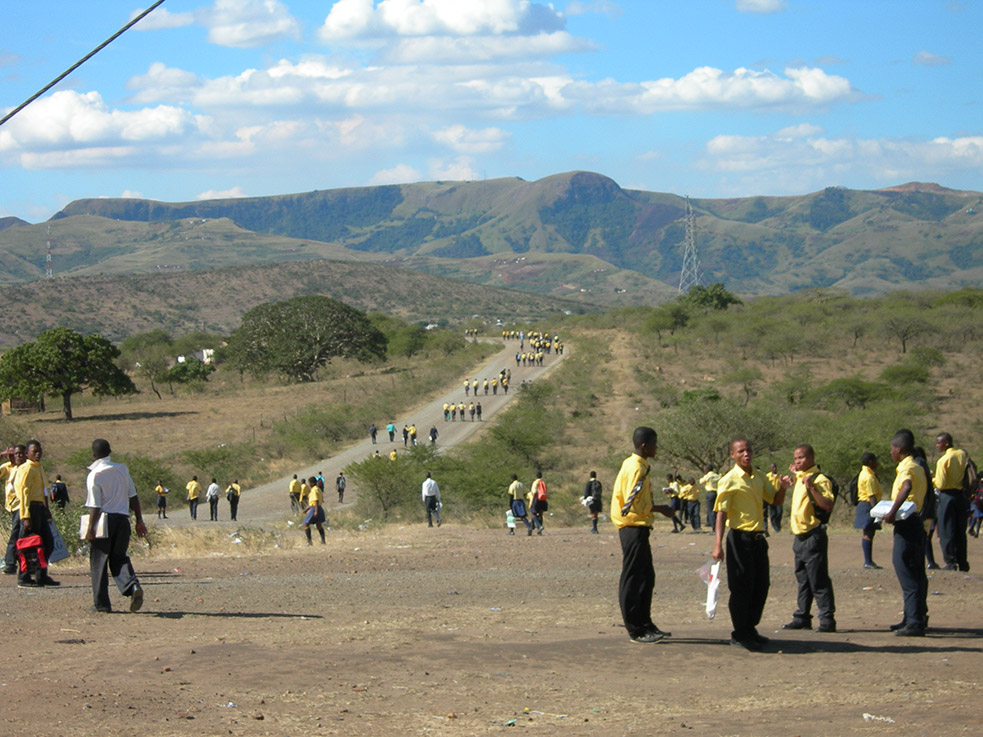
- Road to Mnyakanya High School, Nkandla

- Location within KwaZulu-Natal Location within South Africa Location within Africa
- Coordinates: 28°37′21″S 31°5′22″E
- Country: South Africa
- Province: KwaZulu-Natal
- District: King Cetshwayo
- Municipality: Nkandla

Government
  - Type: Ward 6
  - Councillor: Phumzile Rolca Dlamini

Area
  - Total: 7.00 km^{2} (2.70 sq mi)
- Elevation: 1,090 m (3,580 ft)

Population (2011)
  - Total: 3,557
  - Density: 508/km^{2} (1,320/sq mi)

Racial makeup (2011)
  - Black African: 98.1%
  - Coloured: 0.4%
  - Indian/Asian: 0.3%
  - White: 0.7%
  - Other: 0.5%

First languages (2011)
  - Zulu: 92.4%
  - English: 3.0%
  - Other: 4.6%
- Time zone: UTC+2 (SAST)
- Postal code (street): 3855 up to 3859
- PO box: 3855
- Area code: 035

Nkandla is a town in the uThungulu district of KwaZulu-Natal, South Africa. It is the seat of the Nkandla Local Municipality, and the district in which the residence of the former President of South Africa, Jacob Zuma, is located. The residence is located 40 kilometres to the south of the town of Nkandla, beyond the Nkandla Forest and on the road to Kranskop.

The Nkandla region encompasses nearly 115,000 inhabitants, spread relatively sparsely over a large area. Nkandla is mainly a rural area and is in the top five of the poorest places in KwaZulu-Natal province. Poverty is prevalent, with 44% unemployment. The majority of the population are Zulus.

The Nkandla Local Municipality is a Category B municipality situated within the King Cetshwayo District in the KwaZulu-Natal Province. It is one of the five municipalities that make up the district. Nkandla has a claim to be the ‘cradle' of Zulu history. From Malandela to Shaka, to Dingane and Cetshwayo, Nkandla has been at the centre stage of the Zulu nation's history.

The graves of King Malandela and Cetshwayo and Inkosi Sgananda are at Nkandla.

The area is located approximately 50 km southwest of UMthonjaneni Local Municipality, 70 km from UMlalazi Local Municipality, and approximately 50 km away from Isandlwana battlefields.

A 2004 documentary, The Orphans of Nkandla, by the BBC and Truevision, recounted the hardships and poverty of orphans in Nkandla. The land is owned by the Ingonyama Trust, which, through Zulu King Misuzulu kaZwelithini, administers KwaZulu-Natal's traditional lands on behalf of the state for the benefit of its occupants. Zuma's property comprises 3.83 hectares.

Zuma was joined by Nelson Mandela to open Mnyakanya High School in 2004.
