= Provinces of South Africa =

First-level administrative divisions

- Category: Regional state
- Location: South Africa
- Created: 27 April 1994
- Number: 9 Provinces
- Populations: 1,355,946 (Northern Cape) – 15,099,422 (Gauteng)
- Areas: 18,178 km^{2} (7,019 sq mi) (Gauteng) – 372,889 km^{2} (143,973 sq mi) (Northern Cape)
- Government: Provincial government; National government
- Subdivisions: Districts Metropolitan municipality

South Africa is administered under nine provinces. On the eve of the 1994 general election, South Africa's former homelands, known as Bantustans, were reintegrated into the country, and the four provinces were increased to nine. The borders of Natal and the Orange Free State were retained, while the Cape Province and Transvaal Province were divided into three provinces each, plus North West Province which straddles the border of and contains territory from both of these former provinces. The twelfth, thirteenth and sixteenth amendments to the Constitution of South Africa changed the borders of seven of the provinces.

== History ==
The provinces at the creation of the Union in 1910

The Union of South Africa was established in 1910 by combining four British colonies: Cape Colony, Natal Colony, Transvaal Colony, and Orange River Colony. The last two were, before the Second Boer War, independent republics known as the South African Republic and the Orange Free State. These colonies became the four original provinces of the Union: Cape Province, Natal Province, Transvaal Province, and Orange Free State Province.

Provinces and homelands, as they were at the end of apartheid

Segregation of the black population started as early as 1913, with ownership of land by the black majority being restricted to certain areas totalling about 13% of the country. From the late 1950s, these areas were gradually consolidated into "homelands", also called "bantustans". Four of these homelands were established as quasi-independent nation states of the black population during the apartheid era. In 1976, the homeland of Transkei was the first to accept independence from South Africa, and although this independence was never acknowledged by any other country, three other homelands – Bophuthatswana (1977), Venda (1979) and Ciskei (1981) – followed suit.

On 27 April 1994, the date of the first non-racial elections and of the adoption of the Interim Constitution, all of these provinces and homelands were dissolved, and nine new provinces were established. The boundaries of these provinces were established in 1993 by a Commission on the Demarcation/Delimitation of Regions created by CODESA, and were broadly based on planning regions demarcated by the Development Bank of Southern Africa in the 1980s, and amalgamated from existing magisterial districts, with some concessions to political parties that wished to consolidate their power bases, by transferring districts between the proposed provinces. The definitions of the new provinces in terms of magisterial districts were found in Schedule 1 of the Interim Constitution.

On 11 July 2003, the 11th amendment to the fifth constitution renamed the Northern Province to Limpopo. On 1 March 2006, the 12th and 13th amendments altered the boundaries of 7 provinces. On 3 April 2009 the 16th amendment altered the boundaries of the North West and Gauteng provinces.

== Government ==
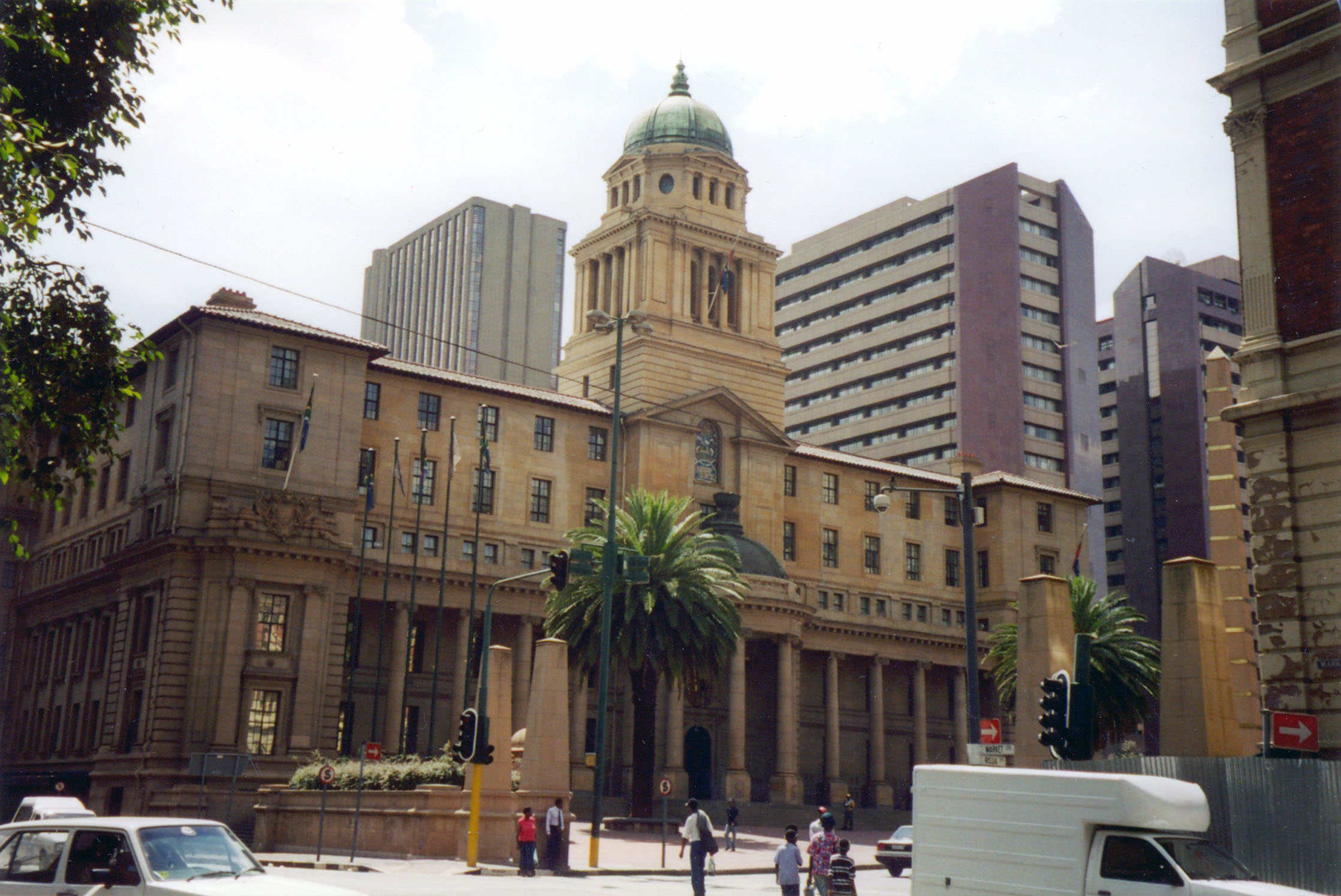
Johannesburg City Hall, now the seat of the Gauteng Provincial Legislature

South Africa's provinces are governed, in different ways, on a national, provincial and local level.

Nationally, there is the National Council of Provinces, one of the houses of Parliament. Then there is the provincial government and, below that, the administration of district and metropolitan municipalities.

=== National Council of Provinces ===
South Africa has two houses of parliament: the National Assembly, and the National Council of Provinces. The second exists to ensure that the interests of each province are protected in the laws passed by the National Assembly.

Each one of South Africa's nine provinces sends 10 representatives to the National Council of Provinces. Six of these are permanent members of the council, and four are special delegates.

=== Provincial government ===
Each province is governed by a unicameral legislature. The size of the legislature is proportional to population, ranging from 30 members in the Northern Cape to 80 in KwaZulu-Natal. The legislatures are elected every five years by a system of party-list proportional representation; by convention, they are all elected on the same day, at the same time as the National Assembly election.

The provincial legislature elects, from amongst its members, a Premier, who is the head of the executive. The Premier chooses an Executive Council consisting of between five and ten members of the legislature, which is the cabinet of the provincial government. The Members of the Executive Council (MECs) are the provincial equivalent of ministers.

The powers of the provincial government are limited to specific topics listed in the national constitution. On some of these topics – for example, agriculture, education, health and public housing – the province's powers are shared with the national government, which can establish uniform standards and frameworks for the provincial governments to follow; on other topics the provincial government has exclusive power.

The provinces do not have their own court systems, as the administration of justice is the responsibility of the national government.

== List ==
Province	Name in the most spoken native language	Capital (Note: Previous name in brackets, if applicable)	Largest city (Note: Previous name in brackets, if applicable)	Area	Population (2022)	Density (2022)	Map
Eastern Cape	iMpuma-Kapa (Xhosa)	Bhisho (Bisho)	Gqeberha (Port Elizabeth)	168,966 km^{2} (65,238 sq mi)	7,230,204	42.8/km^{2} (111/sq mi)	
Free State	Freistata (Sotho)	Bloemfontein		129,825 km^{2} (50,126 sq mi)	2,964,412	22.8/km^{2} (59/sq mi)	
Gauteng	eGoli (Zulu)	Johannesburg		18,178 km^{2} (7,019 sq mi)	15,099,422	830.6/km^{2} (2,151/sq mi)	
KwaZulu-Natal	iKwaZulu-Natali (Zulu)	Pietermaritzburg (Note: Pietermaritzburg and Ulundi were joint capitals of KwaZulu-Natal from 1994 to 2004.)	Durban	94,361 km^{2} (36,433 sq mi)	12,423,907	131.7/km^{2} (341/sq mi)	
Limpopo	Limpopo (Pedi)	Polokwane (Pietersburg)		125,754 km^{2} (48,554 sq mi)	6,572,720	52.3/km^{2} (135/sq mi)	
Mpumalanga	iMpumalanga (Swazi)	Mbombela (Nelspruit)		76,495 km^{2} (29,535 sq mi)	5,143,324	67.2/km^{2} (174/sq mi)	
North West	Bokone Bophirima (Tswana)	Mahikeng (Mafikeng)	Rustenburg	104,882 km^{2} (40,495 sq mi)	3,804,548	36.3/km^{2} (94/sq mi)	
Northern Cape	Noord-Kaap (Afrikaans)	Kimberley		372,889 km^{2} (143,973 sq mi)	1,355,946	3.6/km^{2} (9.3/sq mi)	
Western Cape (Note: These statistics do not include the Prince Edward Islands (335 km^{2} or 129 sq mi, with no permanent residents), which are South African territories in the sub-Antarctic Indian Ocean but part of the Western Cape for legal and electoral purposes.)	Wes-Kaap (Afrikaans)	Cape Town		129,462 km^{2} (49,986 sq mi)	7,433,019	57.4/km^{2} (149/sq mi)	
Republic of South Africa	iRiphabhuliki yaseNingizimu Afrika (Zulu)	Pretoria; Bloemfontein; Cape Town (Note: Parliament sits in Cape Town, the Supreme Court of Appeal in Bloemfontein, and the executive branch in Pretoria.)	Johannesburg	1,220,813 km^{2} (471,359 sq mi)	62,027,503	50.8/km^{2} (132/sq mi)	

Footnotes:

=== Provincial acronyms ===
Province	HASC	ISO	FIPS	CSS	Conventional
Eastern Cape	ZA.EC	EC	SF05	02	EC
Free State	ZA.FS	FS	SF03	04	FS
Gauteng	ZA.GT	GP	SF06	07	GP
KwaZulu-Natal	ZA.NL	KZN	SF02	05	KZN
Limpopo	ZA.NP	LP	SF09	09	LP
Mpumalanga	ZA.MP	MP	SF07	08	MP
Northern Cape	ZA.NC	NC	SF08	03	NC
North-West	ZA.NW	NW	SF10	06	NW
Western Cape	ZA.WC	WC	SF11	01	WC
Notes HASC: Hierarchical administrative subdivision codes ISO: Province codes from ISO 3166-2. For full identification in a global context, prefix "ZA-" to the code FIPS: Codes from FIPS PUB 10–4, a U.S. government standard. CSS: Province codes used by the Central Statistical Service of South Africa.

== Former administrative divisions ==
Province	Capital	Peak population	Location
Cape of Good Hope (1910–1994)	Cape Town	6,125,335	
Natal (1910–1994)	Pietermaritzburg	2,430,753	
Orange Free State (1910–1994)	Bloemfontein	2,193,062	
Transvaal (1910–1994)	Pretoria	9,491,265	
Homelands	Capital	Peak population	Location
Bophuthatswana (1977–1994) †	Mmabatho	1,478,950	
Ciskei (1972–1994) †	Bisho	677,920	
Gazankulu (1971–1994)	Giyani	954,771	
KaNgwane (1981–1994)	Louieville; Schoemansdal (de facto)	779,240	
KwaNdebele (1981–1994)	KwaMhlanga	404,246	
KwaZulu (1981–1994)	Nongoma (until 1980); Ulundi (1980–1994)	5,524,774	
Lebowa (1972–1994)	Lebowakgomo	2,740,587	
QwaQwa (1974–1994)	Phuthaditjhaba	342,886	
Transkei (1976–1994) †	Umtata	2,323,650	
Venda (1979–1994) †	Thohoyandou	558,797	
Mandates	Capital	Peak population	
South West Africa	Windhoek	1,415,000	

Footnotes:

† States for which the homeland was quasi-independent.

== See also ==
- Elections in South Africa
- List of political families in South Africa
- List of renamed places in South Africa
- List of South African politicians
- List of South African provinces by Human Development Index
- Members of the Executive Council (MEC)
- Member of the Provincial Legislature
- Premier (South Africa)
- Prince Edward Islands
- Proposals for South Africa to annex Lesotho
- Provincial governments of South Africa
- Provincial legislature (South Africa)
- Telephone numbers in South Africa
- Vehicle registration plates of South Africa
- Walvis Bay
- ISO 3166-2:ZA

=== Cities and Municipalities ===
- District municipalities
- List of municipalities in South Africa
  - List of municipalities in the Eastern Cape
  - List of municipalities in the Free State
  - List of municipalities in Gauteng
  - List of municipalities in KwaZulu-Natal
  - List of municipalities in Limpopo
  - List of municipalities in Mpumalanga
  - List of municipalities in the North West
  - List of municipalities in the Northern Cape
  - List of municipalities in the Western Cape
- Metropolitan municipalities
- Municipalities of South Africa
  - List of cities and towns in the Eastern Cape
  - List of cities and towns in the Free State
  - List of cities and towns in Gauteng
  - List of cities and towns in KwaZulu–Natal
  - List of cities and towns in Limpopo
  - List of cities and towns in Mpumalanga
  - List of cities and towns in the Northern Cape
  - List of cities and towns in the North West (South Africa)
  - List of cities and towns in the Western Cape

=== Transportation ===
- List of national routes in South Africa
- List of provincial routes in South Africa
- List of regional routes in South Africa
- List of metropolitan routes in South Africa
  - Metropolitan routes in East London
  - Metropolitan routes in Cape Town
  - Metropolitan routes in Johannesburg
  - Metropolitan routes in Pretoria
  - Metropolitan routes in Durban
  - Metropolitan routes in Bloemfontein
  - Metropolitan routes in Port Elizabeth
  - Metropolitan routes in Pietermaritzburg
- Numbered routes in South Africa
