= Mthonjaneni Local Municipality elections =

Local elections in KwaZulu-Natal, South Africa

The Mthonjaneni Local Municipality council consists of twenty-five members elected by mixed-member proportional representation. Thirteen councillors are elected by first-past-the-post voting in thirteen wards, while the remaining twelve are chosen from party lists so that the total number of party representatives is proportional to the number of votes received.

The municipality was enlarged at the time of the 2016 South African municipal elections when part of the disbanded Ntambanana Local Municipality was merged into it.

In the election of 4 November 2026 the Inkatha Freedom Party (IFP) retained the majority it had won in the by-elections following the previous election.

== Results ==
The following table shows the composition of the council after past elections.

| Event | ANC | EFF | IFP | NFP | MKP | Other | Total |
|---|---|---|---|---|---|---|---|
| 2000 election | 1 | — | 10 | — | — | 0 | 11 |
| 2006 election | 3 | — | 8 | — | — | 0 | 11 |
| 2011 election | 5 | — | 5 | 1 | — | 0 | 11 |
| 2016 election | 10 | 1 | 14 | — | — | 0 | 25 |
| 2021 election | 10 | 1 | 12 | 1 | — | 1 | 25 |
| 2026 election | 3 | 0 | 15 | 0 | 6 | 1 | 25 |

== December 2000 election ==
The following table shows the results of the 2000 election.

| Party | Ward | | | List | | | Total seats |
| Party | Votes | % | Seats | Votes | % | Seats | Total seats |
|---|---|---|---|---|---|---|---|
| Inkatha Freedom Party | 7,424 | 88.23 | 6 | 7,251 | 86.36 | 4 | 10 |
| African National Congress | 820 | 9.75 | 0 | 756 | 9.00 | 1 | 1 |
| Democratic Alliance | | | | 277 | 3.30 | 0 | 0 |
| African Christian Democratic Party | 78 | 0.93 | 0 | 112 | 1.33 | 0 | 0 |
| Independent candidates | 92 | 1.09 | 0 | | | | 0 |
| Total | 8,414 | 100.00 | 6 | 8,396 | 100.00 | 5 | 11 |
| Valid votes | 8,414 | 97.86 | | 8,396 | 97.66 | | |
| Invalid/blank votes | 184 | 2.14 | | 201 | 2.34 | | |
| Total votes | 8,598 | 100.00 | | 8,597 | 100.00 | | |
| Registered voters/turnout | 18,757 | 45.84 | | 18,757 | 45.83 | | |

== March 2006 election ==
The following table shows the results of the 2006 election.

| Party | Ward | | | List | | | Total seats |
| Party | Votes | % | Seats | Votes | % | Seats | Total seats |
|---|---|---|---|---|---|---|---|
| Inkatha Freedom Party | 7,323 | 70.12 | 6 | 7,311 | 70.37 | 2 | 8 |
| African National Congress | 2,658 | 25.45 | 0 | 2,590 | 24.93 | 3 | 3 |
| Democratic Alliance | 280 | 2.68 | 0 | 303 | 2.92 | 0 | 0 |
| National Democratic Convention | 182 | 1.74 | 0 | 186 | 1.79 | 0 | 0 |
| Total | 10,443 | 100.00 | 6 | 10,390 | 100.00 | 5 | 11 |
| Valid votes | 10,443 | 97.54 | | 10,390 | 97.56 | | |
| Invalid/blank votes | 263 | 2.46 | | 260 | 2.44 | | |
| Total votes | 10,706 | 100.00 | | 10,650 | 100.00 | | |
| Registered voters/turnout | 20,466 | 52.31 | | 20,466 | 52.04 | | |

== May 2011 election ==
The following table shows the results of the 2011 election.

| Party | Ward | | | List | | | Total seats |
| Party | Votes | % | Seats | Votes | % | Seats | Total seats |
|---|---|---|---|---|---|---|---|
| Inkatha Freedom Party | 6,197 | 45.58 | 3 | 6,229 | 45.77 | 2 | 5 |
| African National Congress | 5,721 | 42.08 | 3 | 5,737 | 42.16 | 2 | 5 |
| National Freedom Party | 1,449 | 10.66 | 0 | 1,373 | 10.09 | 1 | 1 |
| Democratic Alliance | 169 | 1.24 | 0 | 213 | 1.57 | 0 | 0 |
| African Christian Democratic Party | 61 | 0.45 | 0 | 56 | 0.41 | 0 | 0 |
| Total | 13,597 | 100.00 | 6 | 13,608 | 100.00 | 5 | 11 |
| Valid votes | 13,597 | 98.48 | | 13,608 | 98.60 | | |
| Invalid/blank votes | 210 | 1.52 | | 193 | 1.40 | | |
| Total votes | 13,807 | 100.00 | | 13,801 | 100.00 | | |
| Registered voters/turnout | 22,731 | 60.74 | | 22,731 | 60.71 | | |

== August 2016 election ==
The following table shows the results of the 2016 election.

| Party | Ward | | | List | | | Total seats |
| Party | Votes | % | Seats | Votes | % | Seats | Total seats |
|---|---|---|---|---|---|---|---|
| Inkatha Freedom Party | 15,553 | 56.60 | 11 | 15,561 | 56.56 | 3 | 14 |
| African National Congress | 11,225 | 40.85 | 2 | 11,287 | 41.03 | 8 | 10 |
| Economic Freedom Fighters | 433 | 1.58 | 0 | 397 | 1.44 | 1 | 1 |
| Democratic Alliance | 270 | 0.98 | 0 | 267 | 0.97 | 0 | 0 |
| Total | 27,481 | 100.00 | 13 | 27,512 | 100.00 | 12 | 25 |
| Valid votes | 27,481 | 98.33 | | 27,512 | 98.45 | | |
| Invalid/blank votes | 466 | 1.67 | | 434 | 1.55 | | |
| Total votes | 27,947 | 100.00 | | 27,946 | 100.00 | | |
| Registered voters/turnout | 44,562 | 62.71 | | 44,562 | 62.71 | | |

=== August 2016 to November 2021 by-elections ===
In a by-election held on 25 July 2018, a ward previously held by an ANC councillor was won by the IFP candidate. Council composition was reconfigured as seen below:

| Party | Ward | PR list | Total |
|---|---|---|---|
| Inkatha Freedom Party | 12 | 3 | 15 |
| African National Congress | 1 | 8 | 9 |
| Economic Freedom Fighters | 0 | 1 | 1 |
| Total | 13 | 12 | 25 |

== November 2021 election ==
The following table shows the results of the 2021 election.

| Party | Ward | | | List | | | Total seats |
| Party | Votes | % | Seats | Votes | % | Seats | Total seats |
|---|---|---|---|---|---|---|---|
| Inkatha Freedom Party | 10,734 | 46.51 | 8 | 11,391 | 49.34 | 4 | 12 |
| African National Congress | 8,755 | 37.93 | 5 | 8,735 | 37.84 | 5 | 10 |
| Independent candidates | 2,088 | 9.05 | 0 | | | | 0 |
| Academic Congress Union | | | | 1,430 | 6.19 | 1 | 1 |
| Economic Freedom Fighters | 644 | 2.79 | 0 | 675 | 2.92 | 1 | 1 |
| National Freedom Party | 525 | 2.27 | 0 | 510 | 2.21 | 1 | 1 |
| Democratic Alliance | 118 | 0.51 | 0 | 109 | 0.47 | 0 | 0 |
| African Transformation Movement | 111 | 0.48 | 0 | 93 | 0.40 | 0 | 0 |
| Abantu Batho Congress | 65 | 0.28 | 0 | 68 | 0.29 | 0 | 0 |
| African Christian Democratic Party | 28 | 0.12 | 0 | 45 | 0.19 | 0 | 0 |
| African People's Movement | 11 | 0.05 | 0 | 31 | 0.13 | 0 | 0 |
| Total | 23,079 | 100.00 | 13 | 23,087 | 100.00 | 12 | 25 |
| Valid votes | 23,079 | 98.44 | | 23,087 | 98.51 | | |
| Invalid/blank votes | 366 | 1.56 | | 350 | 1.49 | | |
| Total votes | 23,445 | 100.00 | | 23,437 | 100.00 | | |
| Registered voters/turnout | 45,408 | 51.63 | | 45,408 | 51.61 | | |

=== By-elections from November 2021 ===
The following by-elections were held to fill vacant ward seats in the period from November 2021.

| Date | Ward | Party of the previous councillor | Party of the newly elected councillor |
|---|---|---|---|
| 31 August 2022 | 12 | African National Congress | Inkatha Freedom Party |
| 19 July 2023 | 6 | African National Congress | Inkatha Freedom Party |
| 19 June 2024 | 10 | African National Congress | Inkatha Freedom Party |

After the August 2022 by-election, the IFP gained an outright majority by winning a ward from the ANC. As of June 2024, the IFP have won three consecutive wards off the ANC. The composition of the council is as follows:

| Party | Ward | List | Total |
| Inkatha Freedom Party | 11 | 4 | 15 |
| African National Congress | 2 | 5 | 7 |
| Academic Congress Union | 0 | 1 | 1 |
| Economic Freedom Fighters | 0 | 1 | 1 |
| National Freedom Party | 0 | 1 | 1 |
| Total | 13 | 12 | 25 |

== November 2026 election ==
The following table shows the results of the 2026 election.

| Party | Ward | | | List | | | Total seats |
| Party | Votes | % | Seats | Votes | % | Seats | Total seats |
|---|---|---|---|---|---|---|---|
| Inkatha Freedom Party | 14,254 | 58.31 | 13 | 14,221 | 58.26 | 2 | 15 |
| uMkhonto weSizwe Party | 5,754 | 23.54 | 0 | 5,882 | 24.10 | 6 | 6 |
| African National Congress | 2,805 | 11.47 | 0 | 2,751 | 11.27 | 3 | 3 |
| Umkhumbi Wesizwe Organisation | 718 | 2.94 | 0 | 726 | 2.97 | 1 | 1 |
| Democratic Alliance | 244 | 1.00 | 0 | 262 | 1.07 | 0 | 0 |
| National Freedom Party | 159 | 0.65 | 0 | 198 | 0.81 | 0 | 0 |
| Economic Freedom Fighters | 120 | 0.49 | 0 | 140 | 0.57 | 0 | 0 |
| African Transformation Movement | 108 | 0.44 | 0 | 97 | 0.40 | 0 | 0 |
| Independent candidates | 184 | 0.75 | 0 | | | | 0 |
| Afrika Mayibuye Movement | 66 | 0.27 | 0 | 57 | 0.23 | 0 | 0 |
| South African Communist Party | 23 | 0.09 | 0 | 37 | 0.15 | 0 | 0 |
| African Christian Democratic Party | 7 | 0.03 | 0 | 37 | 0.15 | 0 | 0 |
| African Renaissance Unity | 3 | 0.01 | 0 | | | | 0 |
| Total | 24,445 | 100.00 | 13 | 24,408 | 100.00 | 12 | 25 |
| Valid votes | 24,445 | 98.84 | | 24,408 | 98.71 | | |
| Invalid/blank votes | 287 | 1.16 | | 319 | 1.29 | | |
| Total votes | 24,732 | 100.00 | | 24,727 | 100.00 | | |
| Registered voters/turnout | 49,954 | 49.51 | | 49,954 | 49.50 | | |
