= Bhucanana =

- Location within KwaZulu-Natal Location within South Africa
- Coordinates: 28.601°S 31.740°E
- Country: South Africa
- Province: KwaZulu-Natal
- District: King Cetshwayo
- Municipality: uMhlathuze

Area
  - Total: 7.38 km^{2} (2.85 sq mi)

Population (2011)
  - Total: 6,116
  - Density: 829/km^{2} (2,150/sq mi)

Racial makeup (2011)
  - Black African: 99.5%
  - Coloured: 0.1%
  - Indian/Asian: 0.3%
  - Other: 0.2%

First languages (2011)
  - Zulu: 97.1%
  - S. Ndebele: 1.3%
  - Other: 1.7%
- Time zone: UTC+2 (SAST)

Bhucanana (also Bhukhanana) is a town in the uMhlathuze Local Municipality in the KwaZulu-Natal province of South Africa.
