= ESikhawini =

Esikhawini
- Location within KwaZulu-Natal Location within South Africa
- Coordinates: 28°53′S 31°54′E
- Country: South Africa
- Province: KwaZulu-Natal
- District: King Cetshwayo
- Municipality: uMhlathuze

Area
  - Total: 5.90 km^{2} (2.28 sq mi)

Population (2001)
  - Total: 32,437
  - Density: 5,500/km^{2} (14,200/sq mi)

Racial makeup (2001)
  - Black African: 99.8%
  - Coloured: 0.1%

First languages (2001)
  - Zulu: 98.5%
  - Sesotho: 0.1%
- Time zone: UTC+2 (SAST)
- Postal code (street): 3887

eSikhaleni, more commonly known as eSikhawini or Esikhawini is a township of the City of uMhlathuze Local Municipality in the KwaZulu-Natal province of South Africa.

Esikhawini is located 2 km off the N2 route. Richards Bay and Empangeni are closest towns, being both located 15–20 km away. It was established in 1976 as a black township consisting of middle income residents.

== Sports facilities ==
- Esikhawini H Ground
- Esikhawini College
- Tisand Tech High School
- Sithole place
- Tebugho (social work welfare)
- Thabiso center
- Dephini ground

== Places ==
- Madlankala Reserve
- Madlankala village
- Mabuyeni
- Esikhawini J
- Esikhawini H
- Dube village Found on the northern outskirts of the H section it is one of the oldest villages of Esikhawini.
- Gobandlovu Reserve
- Port Dunford (PD)
