= BAFTA Awards 2005 =

BAFTA Awards 2005 may refer to:

- 59th British Academy Film Awards
- British Academy Television Awards 2005
