= Nkandla Local Municipality elections =

Local elections in KwaZulu-Natal, South Africa

The Nkandla Local Municipality council consists of twenty-seven members elected by mixed-member proportional representation. Fourteen councillors are elected by first-past-the-post voting in fourteen wards, while the remaining thirteen are chosen from party lists so that the total number of party representatives is proportional to the number of votes received.

In the election of 4 November 2026 the Inkatha Freedom Party (IFP) won a reduced majority of fourteen seats on the council.

== Results ==
The following table shows the composition of the council after past elections.

Event	ANC	IFP	MKP	Other	Total
2000 election	1	25	—	1	27
2006 election	4	23	—	0	27
2011 election	11	13	—	3	27
2016 election	12	15	—	0	27
2021 election	10	16	—	1	27
2021 election	3	14	9	1	27

== December 2000 election ==
The following table shows the results of the 2000 election.

Party	Ward			List			Total seats
Party	Votes	%	Seats	Votes	%	Seats	Total seats
Inkatha Freedom Party	22,271	90.05	13	23,409	94.45	12	25
African National Congress	1,285	5.20	0	1,376	5.55	1	1
Independent candidates	1,176	4.75	1				1
Total	24,732	100.00	14	24,785	100.00	13	27
Valid votes	24,732	98.56		24,785	98.38		
Invalid/blank votes	362	1.44		409	1.62		
Total votes	25,094	100.00		25,194	100.00		
Registered voters/turnout	44,835	55.97		44,835	56.19		

== March 2006 election ==
The following table shows the results of the 2006 election.

Party	Ward			List			Total seats
Party	Votes	%	Seats	Votes	%	Seats	Total seats
Inkatha Freedom Party	22,339	84.88	14	22,419	85.19	9	23
African National Congress	3,131	11.90	0	3,267	12.41	4	4
Democratic Alliance	263	1.00	0	286	1.09	0	0
National Democratic Convention	164	0.62	0	345	1.31	0	0
Independent candidates	422	1.60	0				0
Total	26,319	100.00	14	26,317	100.00	13	27
Valid votes	26,319	98.37		26,317	98.39		
Invalid/blank votes	437	1.63		431	1.61		
Total votes	26,756	100.00		26,748	100.00		
Registered voters/turnout	47,049	56.87		47,049	56.85		

== May 2011 election ==
The following table shows the results of the 2011 election.

Party	Ward			List			Total seats
Party	Votes	%	Seats	Votes	%	Seats	Total seats
Inkatha Freedom Party	13,739	46.39	8	13,619	45.96	5	13
African National Congress	12,084	40.81	6	12,320	41.58	5	11
National Freedom Party	3,791	12.80	0	3,691	12.46	3	3
Total	29,614	100.00	14	29,630	100.00	13	27
Valid votes	29,614	98.24		29,630	98.42		
Invalid/blank votes	530	1.76		477	1.58		
Total votes	30,144	100.00		30,107	100.00		
Registered voters/turnout	49,242	61.22		49,242	61.14		

== August 2016 election ==
The following table shows the results of the 2016 election.

Party	Ward			List			Total seats
Party	Votes	%	Seats	Votes	%	Seats	Total seats
Inkatha Freedom Party	20,150	53.76	11	20,368	54.24	4	15
African National Congress	16,521	44.08	3	16,676	44.41	9	12
Economic Freedom Fighters	337	0.90	0	255	0.68	0	0
Democratic Alliance	301	0.80	0	252	0.67	0	0
Independent candidates	169	0.45	0				0
Total	37,478	100.00	14	37,551	100.00	13	27
Valid votes	37,478	98.60		37,551	98.67		
Invalid/blank votes	533	1.40		506	1.33		
Total votes	38,011	100.00		38,057	100.00		
Registered voters/turnout	57,706	65.87		57,706	65.95		

== November 2021 election ==
The following table shows the results of the 2021 election.

Party	Ward			List			Total seats
Party	Votes	%	Seats	Votes	%	Seats	Total seats
Inkatha Freedom Party	18,429	55.82	12	19,205	58.37	4	16
African National Congress	11,268	34.13	2	11,460	34.83	8	10
Independent candidates	1,809	5.48	0				0
Economic Freedom Fighters	876	2.65	0	811	2.47	1	1
KZN Independence				687	2.09	0	0
Justice and Employment Party	259	0.78	0	329	1.00	0	0
National Freedom Party	133	0.40	0	141	0.43	0	0
Abantu Batho Congress	121	0.37	0	139	0.42	0	0
Democratic Alliance	112	0.34	0	100	0.30	0	0
African Transformation Movement	6	0.02	0	28	0.09	0	0
Total	33,013	100.00	14	32,900	100.00	13	27
Valid votes	33,013	98.76		32,900	98.41		
Invalid/blank votes	413	1.24		530	1.59		
Total votes	33,426	100.00		33,430	100.00		
Registered voters/turnout	59,837	55.86		59,837	55.87		

=== By-elections from November 2021 ===
The following by-elections were held to fill vacant ward seats in the period from November 2021.

19 July 2023	6	Inkatha Freedom Party	Inkatha Freedom Party
11 Sep 2024	4	Inkatha Freedom Party	Inkatha Freedom Party

== November 2026 election ==
The following table shows the results of the 2026 election.

Party	Ward			List			Total seats
Party	Votes	%	Seats	Votes	%	Seats	Total seats
Inkatha Freedom Party	16,833	50.15	11	16,778	49.99	3	14
uMkhonto weSizwe Party	10,920	32.54	3	11,103	33.08	6	9
African National Congress	3,912	11.66	0	3,721	11.09	3	3
Democratic Alliance	999	2.98	0	984	2.93	1	1
Afrika Mayibuye Movement	382	1.14	0	343	1.02	0	0
Umkhumbi Wesizwe Organisation	258	0.77	0	282	0.84	0	0
National Freedom Party	114	0.34	0	125	0.37	0	0
Economic Freedom Fighters	88	0.26	0	133	0.40	0	0
South African Communist Party	39	0.12	0	59	0.18	0	0
African Transformation Movement	15	0.04	0	32	0.10	0	0
Independent candidates	3	0.01	0				0
Total	33,563	100.00	14	33,560	100.00	13	27
Valid votes	33,563	99.10		33,560	99.12		
Invalid/blank votes	306	0.90		299	0.88		
Total votes	33,869	100.00		33,859	100.00		
Registered voters/turnout	66,502	50.93		66,502	50.91		
