= Biyela =

Biyela is a surname. Notable people with the surname include:

- Bafo Biyela (1981–2012), South African football player
- Bhekizwe Biyela, South African politician
- Nokwethemba Biyela (born 1954), South African politician
- Ntsiki Biyela (born 1978), South African winemaker and businesswoman
- Thando Biyela (born 2004), South African rugby player
- Zimiphi Biyela (born 1983), South African actress
