= Nkandla Local Municipality =

Nkandla
- Local municipality
- Seal

- Location in KwaZulu-Natal
- Coordinates: 28°40′S 31°0′E
- Country: South Africa
- Province: KwaZulu-Natal
- District: King Cetshwayo
- Seat: Nkandla
- Wards: 14

Government
  - Type: Municipal council
  - Mayor: Thami Ntuli

Area
  - Total: 1,828 km^{2} (706 sq mi)

Population (2011)
  - Total: 114,416
  - Density: 62.59/km^{2} (162.1/sq mi)

Racial makeup (2011)
  - Black African: 99.6%
  - Coloured: 0.1%
  - Indian/Asian: 0.1%
  - White: 0.1%

First languages (2011)
  - Zulu: 95.7%
  - Southern Ndebele: 1.3%
  - English: 1.3%
  - Other: 1.7%
- Time zone: UTC+2 (SAST)
- Municipal code: KZN286

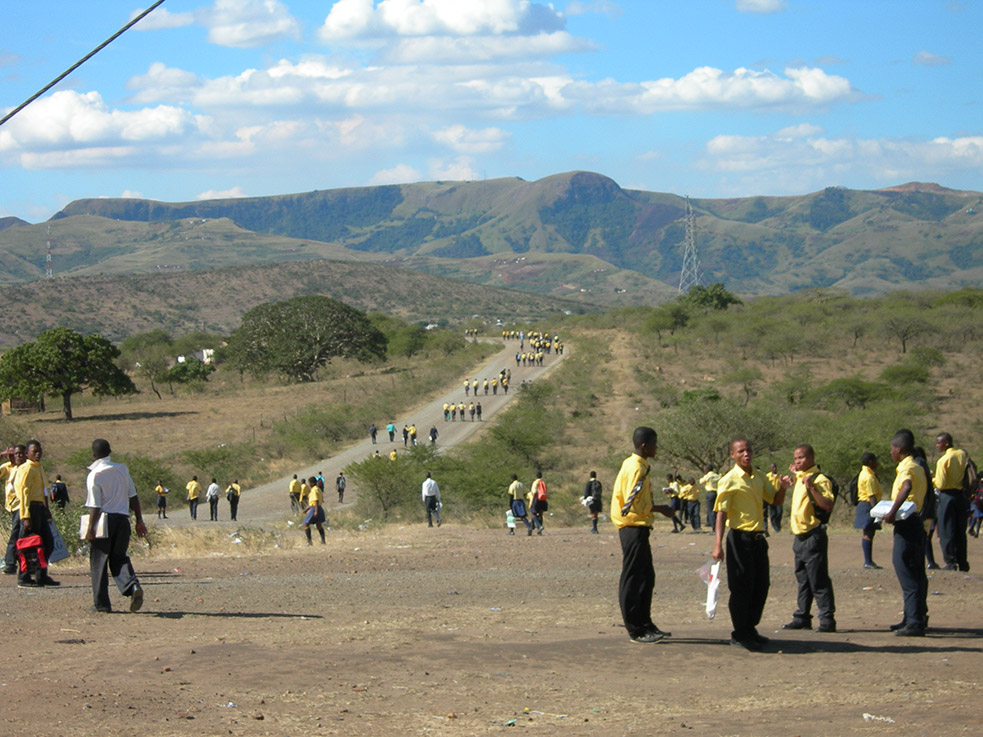
Road in Nkandla Local Municipality

Nkandla Local Municipality is an administrative area in the King Cetshwayo District of KwaZulu-Natal province in South Africa. The town of Nkandla (seat of the municipality) is the home town of the former President of South Africa, Jacob Zuma.

Nkandla (Enqabeni Enkulu KwaZulu) is a Zulu name for a hiding place of the Zulus a long time ago during the times of war, e.g. the Bambatha Rebellion and the Ndwandwe war from Entumeni. The warriors used the Nkandla forest as their last resort for protection from their enemies. It was very difficult to fight the warriors who were hiding in the thick and dark forest (iNkandla eMahlathi Amnyama). Most of the Zulu heroes' graves are found at Nkandla, for example, Bambatha's grave is at Nsuze.

== Main places ==
=== Census 2011 ===
According to the first georeferenced 2011 census there are 142 places.

=== Census 2001 ===
The 2001 census divided the municipality into the following main places:

Place	Code	Area (km^{2})	Population
Chube	54201	31.60	3,056
Chwezi	54202	55.24	6,097
Cube	54203	70.12	4,417
Cunu	54204	113.78	7,067
Ekukhanyeni	54205	53.94	6,842
Emagidini	54206	98.98	6,850
Godide	54207	128.17	12,676
Halambu	54208	6.90	345
Isilokomane	54209	6.11	487
Izigqoza	54210	38.43	3,404
Izindlozi	54211	7.74	826
Kahile	54212	6.06	273
Khabela	54213	93.65	7,167
Kwamkwaza	54214	11.57	1,113
Magwaza	54215	12.49	1,275
Mahlayizeni	54216	58.39	5,310
Magidini	54217	101.54	5,224
Mbhele/Amphuti	54218	46.26	3,676
Mdimela	54219	14.05	606
Mhlathuze	54220	5.94	391
Mpungose	54221	109.66	7,608
Murasie	54222	10.10	874
Mthandanhle	54223	12.54	1,044
Ndindini	54224	10.56	148
Ngono	54225	203.07	8,096
Nkandla Part 1	54226	210.92	17,424
Nkandla Part 2	54237	3.97	2,783
Nkandla Part 3	54238	44.61	12
Nkonisa	54227	10.77	893
Nkweme	54228	8.20	569
Ntuli	54229	56.28	804
Nxamalala	54230	58.22	4,841
Uxutu	54231	11.45	926
Vumanhlamvu	54232	9.30	643
Xulu	54233	37.58	3,598
Zindunduzeli	54234	10.66	538
Zinkuzini	54235	14.18	489
Zondi	54236	44.38	5,171

== Politics ==
The municipal council consists of twenty-seven members elected by mixed-member proportional representation. Fourteen councillors are elected by first-past-the-post voting in fourteen wards, while the remaining thirteen are chosen from party lists so that the total number of party representatives is proportional to the number of votes received.

In the election of 4 November 2026 the Inkatha Freedom Party (IFP) won a reduced majority of fourteen seats on the council.

The following table shows the results of the election.

Party	Ward			List			Total seats
Party	Votes	%	Seats	Votes	%	Seats	Total seats
Inkatha Freedom Party	16,833	50.15	11	16,778	49.99	3	14
uMkhonto weSizwe Party	10,920	32.54	3	11,103	33.08	6	9
African National Congress	3,912	11.66	0	3,721	11.09	3	3
Democratic Alliance	999	2.98	0	984	2.93	1	1
Independent candidates	3	0.01	0				0
6 other parties	896	2.67	0	974	2.90	0	0
Total	33,563	100.00	14	33,560	100.00	13	27
Valid votes	33,563	99.10		33,560	99.12		
Invalid/blank votes	306	0.90		299	0.88		
Total votes	33,869	100.00		33,859	100.00		
Registered voters/turnout	66,502	50.93		66,502	50.91		
