= The Orphans of Nkandla =

- Release dates: 2004
- Country: South Africa
- Language: English

The Orphans of Nkandla is a 2004 documentary film about AIDS orphans in the South African town of Nkandla, produced and directed by Brian Woods and Deborah Shipley.

The film won the Flaherty Award for Best Single Documentary at the 2005 British Academy Television Awards.
