= List of French place names in South Africa =

The following is an incomplete list of French place names in South Africa. In brackets, the namesakes (if there are any) of the places.

== List ==
- Bon Accord Dam
- Bonnefoi, Mpumalanga (Bonnefoi)
- Cabriere, Free State (Cabrières)
- Calais (Calais)
- Chavonnesberg, Worcester
- Coligny
- Fontainebleau (Fontainebleau)
- Gravelotte (Gravelotte)
- Languedoc (Languedoc)
- La Rochelle, Johannesburg (La Rochelle)
- La Rochelle, Durbanville
- La Mercy
- La Motte, Western Cape (La Motte)
- La Plaisante, Western Cape
- Lorraine (Lorraine)
- Marseilles (Marseille)
- Mont-Aux-Sources
- Mouille Point
- Parys (Paris)
- Rouxville
- Simondium
- Val du Charron is the former name of Wellington.
- Verhuellpolis is the former name of Bethulie.
