= George Heaton Nicholls =

South African politician

George Heaton Nicholls, PC (1876 – 25 September 1959) was a British-born South African politician.

== Biography ==
Born in England, Nicholls served with the British Army in India, and saw action in the Burma and Tirah campaigns. He came to South Africa from Ceylon during the Second Boer War. He joined the British South Africa Police in 1902, and accompanied Chief Lewanika to the coronation of King Edward VII. He served as District Commissioner in North-Western Rhodesia and Magistrate for the Territory of Papua.

Returning to South Africa to engage in sugar farming in Umfolozi, Nicholls was elected to the Union Parliament for the Zululand constituency in 1920. He was leader of the Natal Parliamentary Group during its existence. A Senator in 1939 and from 1948 to 1954, Nicholls was a member of the Indian Round Table Conference, Cape Town, the Indian Colonization Commission; and a permanent member of the Native Affairs Commission.

He was Administrator of Natal from 1942 to 1944, High Commissioner for the Union of South Africa in London from 1944 to 1947, head of the South African delegation to the preparatory conference and Assembly of the United Nations in London in 1946, then a delegate to the UN Assembly, New York. He represented South Africa at the inauguration of the Parliament of Ceylon in 1948. He was sworn of the Privy Council the same year.

== Books / Further Reading ==
Nicholls, G. Heaton (1961). SOUTH AFRICA IN MY TIME. London: George Allen & Unwin.
