= Lorraine, Gqeberha =

Suburb of Gqeberha, South Africa

Lorraine
- Location within Eastern Cape Location within South Africa
- Coordinates: 33°58′21″S 25°29′53″E
- Country: South Africa
- Province: Eastern Cape
- Municipality: Nelson Mandela Bay
- Main Place: Gqeberha

Area
  - Total: 4.22 km^{2} (1.63 sq mi)

Population
  - Total: 8,004
  - Density: 1,900/km^{2} (4,910/sq mi)

Racial makeup (2011)
  - Black African: 8.0%
  - Coloured: 3.6%
  - Indian/Asian: 1.4%
  - White: 86.5%
  - Other: 0.5%

First languages (2011)
  - English: 54.3%
  - Afrikaans: 40.7%
  - Xhosa: 2.7%
  - Other: 2.3%
- Time zone: UTC+2 (SAST)
- Postal code (street): 6070

Lorraine is a western suburb of Gqeberha, Eastern Cape in South Africa.

== Location ==
Lorraine is located 13 km west of Gqeberha's city centre and borders the suburbs of Beverly Grove, Weybridge Park and Woodlands to the north, Goldwater to the north-east, Fairview to the east, Theescombe to the south and Kamma Park to the west.

Lorraine is located a few kilometres south of the N2 highway (to Humansdorp and Makhanda) and is connected to the N2 via the M7 (Bramlin Street) and M12 (Kragga Kamma Road).

== Facilities ==
Lorraine falls under the policing precinct of the Walmer Police Station, situated just 10 km west of Lorraine.

The nearest hospitals to Lorraine is the Nurture Aurora Hospital in Walmer Downs for people with disabilities and the Netcare Greenacres Hospital in Greenacres. However, Lorraine does have a frail care centre.

Lorraine is host to two shopping centres, Kamma Crossing and The Gardens Shopping Centre. Nearby and larger shopping centres include Baywest Mall and Greenacres Shopping Centre.

== Education ==
Schools in Lorraine include Lorraine Primary School and the Amadeus Independent School. Nearby schools include Kabega Christian Independent School, Sunridge Primary School, St Joseph's RC School, Curro Westbrook, Westering High School and Westering Primary School amongst others.
