= Cebekhulu =

Cebekhulu is a surname. Notable people with the surname include:

- Katiza Cebekhulu (born 1970), South African whistleblower
- Russel Cebekhulu (fl. from 2009), South African politician
