= 2005 British Academy Television Awards =

UK television awards ceremony

- Date: 17 April 2005
- Site: Theatre Royal, Drury Lane
- Hosted by: Graham Norton

Highlights
- Best Comedy Series: Little Britain
- Best Drama: Sex Traffic
- Best Actor: Rhys Ifans; Not Only But Always
- Best Actress: Anamaria Marinca; Sex Traffic
- Best Comedy Performance: Matt Lucas and David Walliams Little Britain

Television coverage
- Channel: BBC One
- Ratings: 4.61 million

The 2005 British Academy Television Awards were held on Sunday 17 April at the Theatre Royal, Drury Lane in London. The ceremony was hosted by Irish comedian and television presenter Graham Norton.

== Winners ==
- Best Actor
  - Winner: Rhys Ifans — Not Only But Always (Channel 4)
  - Other nominees: Benedict Cumberbatch — Hawking (BBC Two); Michael Sheen — Dirty Filthy Love (ITV); Mark Strong — The Long Firm (BBC Two)
- Best Actress
  - Winner: Anamaria Marinca — Sex Traffic (Channel 4)
  - Other nominees: Brenda Blethyn — Belonging (ITV); Anne-Marie Duff — Shameless (Channel 4); Lia Williams — May 33rd (BBC One)
- Best Comedy (Programme or Series)
  - Winner: Little Britain (BBC / BBC Three)
  - Other nominees: The Catherine Tate Show (Tiger Aspect Productions / BBC Two); Harry Hill's TV Burp (Avalon Television / ITV); The Mark Steel Lectures (BBC / BBC Four)
- Best Comedy Performance
  - Winner: Matt Lucas and David Walliams — Little Britain (BBC Three)
  - Other nominees: Rory Bremner — Bremner, Bird and Fortune (Channel 4); Julia Davis — Nighty Night (BBC Three); Tamsin Greig — Green Wing (Channel 4)
- Best Drama Serial
  - Winner: Sex Traffic (Granada Productions / Channel 4)
  - Other nominees: Blackpool (BBC / BBC One); The Long Firm (BBC / BBC Two); Outlaws (World Productions / BBC Three)
- Best Drama Series
  - Winner: Shameless (Company Pictures / Channel 4)
  - Other nominees: Bodies (Hat Trick Productions / BBC Three); Conviction (Red Production Company / BBC Three); Spooks (Kudos Film & Television / BBC One)
- Best Single Drama
  - Winner: Omagh (Tiger Aspect Productions / Channel 4)
  - Other nominees: Dirty Filthy Love (Granada Television / ITV); Hawking (BBC / BBC Two); Not Only But Always (Company Pictures / Channel 4)
- Best Continuing Drama
  - Winner: Coronation Street (Granada Television / ITV)
  - Other nominees: The Bill (Talkback Thames / ITV); Doctors (BBC / BBC One); Holby City (BBC / BBC One)
- Best Current Affairs
  - Winner: Death in Gaza (Frostbite Films / HBO / Channel 4)
  - Other nominees: The Secret Agent (BBC / BBC One); Tonight with Trevor McDonald: Our Daughter Holly (SMG / Psychology News / Granada Television / ITV); Nurseries Undercover: The Real Story (BBC / BBC One)
- Best Entertainment Performance
  - Winner: Paul O'Grady — The Paul O'Grady Show (ITV)
  - Other nominees: Ant and Dec — I'm a Celebrity... Get Me Out of Here! (ITV); Stephen Fry — QI (BBC Two); Paul Merton — Have I Got News For You (BBC One)
- Best Factual Series or Strand
  - Winner: The Power of Nightmares (BBC / BBC Two)
  - Other nominees: Brat Camp (Twenty Twenty Television / Channel 4); Himalaya with Michael Palin (Prominent Television / BBC One); Who Do You Think You Are? (Wall to Wall / BBC Two)
- Best Feature
  - Winner: Ramsay's Kitchen Nightmares (Optomen Television / Channel 4)
  - Other nominees: Holiday Showdown (RDF Media / ITV); Little Angels (BBC / BBC Three); Top Gear (BBC / BBC Two)
- Flaherty Award for Single Documentary
  - Winner: The Orphans of Nkandla (True Vision / BBC Four)
  - Other nominees: The Boy Whose Skin Fell Off (Yipp Films / Channel 4); The Brighton Bomb (BBC / BBC One); The F***ing Fulfords (Optomen Television / Channel 4)
- Huw Wheldon Award for Specialist Factual
  - Winner: Dunkirk (BBC / BBC Two)
  - Other nominees: D-Day (Dangerous Films / BBC One); D-Day: The Ultimate Conflict (Windfall Films / Five); Howard Goodall's 20th Century Greats (Tiger Aspect Productions / Channel 4)
- Lew Grade Entertainment Programme or Series
  - Winner: I'm a Celebrity... Get Me Out of Here! (Granada Television / ITV)
  - Other nominees: Friday Night with Jonathan Ross (Open Mike Productions / BBC One); QI (Talkback Thames / Quite Interesting Productions / BBC Two); Strictly Come Dancing (BBC / BBC One)
- News Coverage
  - Winner: BBC Ten O'Clock News: Madrid Bombing (BBC / BBC One)
  - Other nominees: BBC News 24 - Hutton (BBC / BBC News 24); Sky News - The Tsunami Disaster (Sky News); Tsunami - Seven Days that Shook the World (ITN / ITV)
- Situation Comedy Award
  - Winner: Black Books (Assembly Film & Television / Big Talk Productions / Channel 4)
  - Other nominees: Green Wing (Talkback Thames / Channel 4); Nighty Night (Baby Cow Productions / BBC Three); The Vicar of Dibley Christmas Special (Tiger Aspect Productions / BBC One)
- Sport
  - Winner: Olympics 2004: Matthew Pinsent's gold medal (BBC / BBC One)
  - Other nominees: Euro 2004: France v England (Granada Sport / ITV); Formula One: Monaco Grand Prix (North One Television / ITV); Olympics 2004: Final night athletics (BBC / BBC One)
- The Pioneer Award
  - Winner: Green Wing (Talkback Thames / Channel 4);
  - Other nominees: Shameless (Channel 4): This World: One Day of War (BBC / BBC 2): Who Do You Think You Are? (Wall to Wall / BBC Two)
- The Dennis Potter Award
  - Alan Plater
- The Alan Clarke Award
  - Paul Greengrass
- The Richard Dimbleby Award
  - Jon Snow
- Special Awards
  - Michael Palin
  - ITV on its 50th anniversary
