= Ntambanana Local Municipality =

Ntambanana
- Local municipality
- Seal

- Location in KwaZulu-Natal
- Coordinates: 28°35′S 31°44′E
- Country: South Africa
- Province: KwaZulu-Natal
- District: uThungulu
- Seat: Bhucanana
- Wards: 8

Government
  - Type: Municipal council
  - Mayor: Bhekuyise Justice Biyela

Area
  - Total: 1,083 km^{2} (418 sq mi)

Population (2011)
  - Total: 74,336
  - Density: 68.64/km^{2} (177.8/sq mi)

Racial makeup (2011)
  - Black African: 99.4%
  - Coloured: 0.2%
  - Indian/Asian: 0.2%
  - White: 0.2%

First languages (2011)
  - Zulu: 95.6%
  - Southern Ndebele: 1.4%
  - English: 1.3%
  - Other: 1.7%
- Time zone: UTC+2 (SAST)
- Municipal code: KZN283

Ntambanana Local Municipality was a local municipality within the uThungulu District of KwaZulu-Natal in South Africa. In 2016, the municipality was dissolved and its territory divided between Mthonjaneni Local Municipality, uMhlathuze Local Municipality and uMfolozi Local Municipality.

The municipality was named after the Ntambanana River, which passes through the municipality.

The Ingonyama Trust owns 85% of the land in the former municipal area, with the remaining 15% being privately owned by commercial farmers.

== Main places ==
The 2001 census divided the municipality into the following main places:

Place	Code	Area (km^{2})	Population
Bhukhanana	53901	22.61	6,348
Biyela	53902	508.06	44,698
Cebekhulu	53903	56.57	7,334
Mambuka	53904	66.50	11,755
Mhlana	53905	7.28	493
Somopho	53907	92.86	12,223
Remainder of the municipality	53906	330.93	1,918

== Politics ==
The municipal council consisted of sixteen members elected by mixed-member proportional representation. Eight councillors were elected by first-past-the-post voting in eight wards, while the remaining eight were chosen from party lists so that the total number of party representatives was proportional to the number of votes received. In the election of 18 May 2011, no party obtained a majority, and the African National Congress (ANC) and the National Freedom Party (NFP) formed a coalition to govern the municipality. The following table shows the results of the election.

Party	Votes				Seats		
Party	Ward	List	Total	%	Ward	List	Total
ANC	8,657	9,297	17,954	43.7	4	3	7
IFP	7,468	7,423	14,891	36.3	3	3	6
NFP	3,840	3,802	7,642	18.6	1	2	3
Independent	584	–	584	1.4	0	–	0
Total	20,549	20,522	41,071	100.0	8	8	16
Spoilt votes	366	461	827				
