= List of municipalities in Mpumalanga =

A map of Mpumalanga. District municipalities are labelled in capital letters and shaded in three different colours.

Mpumalanga province of South Africa is divided, for local government purposes, into three district municipalities which are in turn divided into seventeen local municipalities.

== District municipalities ==
Name	Code	Seat	Area (km²)	Population (2016)	Pop. density (per km²)
Ehlanzeni District Municipality	DC32	Mbombela	27,896	1,754,931	62.9
Gert Sibande District Municipality	DC30	Ermelo	31,841	1,135,409	35.7
Nkangala District Municipality	DC31	Middelburg	16,758	1,445,624	86.3

== Local municipalities ==
Name	Code	District	Seat	Area (km²)	Population (2016)	Pop. density (per km²)
Albert Luthuli Local Municipality	MP301	Gert Sibande	Carolina	5,559	187,629	33.7
Bushbuckridge Local Municipality	MP325	Ehlanzeni	Bushbuckridge	10,248	546,215	53.3
Dipaleseng Local Municipality	MP306	Gert Sibande	Balfour	2,645	45,232	17.1
Dr JS Moroka Local Municipality	MP316	Nkangala	Siyabuswa	1,416	246,016	173.7
Emakhazeni Local Municipality	MP314	Nkangala	Belfast	4,736	48,149	10.2
Emalahleni Local Municipality	MP312	Nkangala	eMalahleni	2,678	455,228	170.0
Govan Mbeki Local Municipality	MP307	Gert Sibande	Secunda	2,955	340,091	115.1
Lekwa Local Municipality	MP305	Gert Sibande	Standerton	4,557	123,419	27.1
Mbombela Local Municipality	MP326	Ehlanzeni	Mbombela	7,141	695,913	97.4
Mkhondo Local Municipality	MP303	Gert Sibande	Piet Retief	4,882	189,036	38.7
Msukaligwa Local Municipality	MP302	Gert Sibande	Ermelo	6,016	164,608	27.4
Nkomazi Local Municipality	MP324	Ehlanzeni	Malalane	4,787	410,907	85.8
Pixley ka Seme Local Municipality	MP304	Gert Sibande	Volksrust	5,227	85,395	16.3
Steve Tshwete Local Municipality	MP313	Nkangala	Middelburg	3,976	278,749	70.1
Thaba Chweu Local Municipality	MP321	Ehlanzeni	Lydenburg	5,719	101,895	17.8
Thembisile Hani Local Municipality	MP315	Nkangala	eMpumalanga	2,384	333,331	139.8
Victor Khanye Local Municipality	MP311	Nkangala	Delmas	1,568	84,151	53.7

== Former municipalities ==
These municipalities have been dissolved since the current system of local government was established in 2000.

Name	Code	Dissolved	Fate
Bohlabela District Municipality	CBDC4	1 March 2006	Annexed by Ehlanzeni and Mopani District Municipalities
Umjindi Local Municipality	MP323	3 August 2016	Annexed by Mbombela Local Municipality
