= Xulu =

Xulu is a surname. Notable people with the surname include:

- Cedric Xulu (1939–2020), South African footballer
- Mpumelelo Xulu (born 1999), South African cricketer
- Siyanda Xulu (born 1991), South African professional soccer player
- Thulani Xulu, South African politician
- Victor Xulu (born 1983), former South African cricketer
