= Ntuli =

Ntuli is a South African surname that may refer to

- Benjamin Ntuli, South African politician
- Bheki Ntuli (1957–2021), South African politician
- Bheki Ntuli (eThekwini politician), South African politician
- Bongi Ntuli (1991–2023), South African football striker
- Dipuo Ntuli, South African politician
- Mbali Ntuli (born c. 1988), South African politician
- Mdumiseni Ntuli (born 1979), a South African politician
- Mwele Ntuli Malecela (born 1963), Director General of the Tanzanian National Institute for Medical Research
- Nhlakanipho Ntuli (born 1996), South African football midfielder
- Nqobile Ntuli (born 1996), South African field hockey player
- Pitika Ntuli (born 1942), South African sculptor, poet, writer, and academic
- Phumulani Ntuli (born 1986), a South African multidisciplinary artist
- Richard Ntuli, South African politician
- Sam Ntuli (1960–1991), South African activist and trade unionist
- Sibusiso Ntuli (born 1988), South African football midfielder
- Siphesihle Ntuli, South African field hockey coach
- Thami Ntuli, South African politician and educator
- Tshepo Ntuli (born 1995), South African cricketer

Ntuli is also a Zulu clan.

== See also ==
- Ntuli v Donald, a 2010 privacy case in England
