= Bhekizwe Biyela =

South African politician

Member of the National Assembly
- In office May 1994 – June 2009

Personal details
- Citizenship: South Africa
- Party: Inkatha Freedom Party

Bhekizwe Philemon Biyela, also spelled Bekizwe Phillemon Biyela, is a South African politician who represented the Inkatha Freedom Party (IFP) in the National Assembly from 1994 to 2009, gaining election in 1994, 1999, and 2004. During his first two terms, he represented the KwaZulu-Natal constituency, but during his third term he was on the IFP's national party list.
