= Mkhwanazi =

Mkhwanazi is a South African surname. Notable people with the surname include:

- Buhle Mkhwanazi (born 1990), South African footballer
- David Mkhwanazi (born 1951), South African politician
- Jabulile Mkhwanazi (born 1975), South African politician
- Julius Mkhwanazi (born 1973), South African law enforcement official
- Lindokuhle Mkhwanazi (born 1985), South African footballer
- Nhlanhla Mkhwanazi (born 1973), South African law enforcement officer
- Sinamile Mkhwanazi (born 2004), South African soccer player
- Zibusiso Mkhwanazi (born 1983), South African businessman
