= Kwambonambi =

- Location within KwaZulu-Natal Location within South Africa
- Coordinates: 28.6°S 32.083333°E
- Country: South Africa
- Province: KwaZulu-Natal
- District: King Cetshwayo
- Municipality: uMfolozi

Area
  - Total: 3.27 km^{2} (1.26 sq mi)

Population (2011)
  - Total: 2,872
  - Density: 878/km^{2} (2,270/sq mi)

Racial makeup (2011)
  - Black African: 82.6%
  - Coloured: 0.6%
  - Indian/Asian: 0.8%
  - White: 15.6%
  - Other: 0.4%

First languages (2011)
  - Zulu: 77.1%
  - English: 11.2%
  - Afrikaans: 8.7%
  - Other: 2.9%
- Time zone: UTC+2 (SAST)
- PO box: 3915
- Area code: 035

Kwambonambi is a town in King Cetshwayo District Municipality in the KwaZulu-Natal province of South Africa.

Village, centre of sugar and timber areas, 29 km north-east of Empangeni, 30 km south-west of Mtubatuba and 30 km north of Richards Bay. Zulu, ‘place of the Mbonambi’, a tribe which lived there, the name means ‘ill-omen’.
