= List of municipalities in the North West =

The North West province of South Africa is divided, for local government purposes, into four district municipalities which are in turn divided into eighteen local municipalities.

In the following map, the district municipalities are labelled in capital letters and shaded in various different colours.

== District municipalities ==
Name	Code	Seat	Area (km^{2})	Population (2016)	Pop. density (per km^{2})
Bojanala Platinum District Municipality	DC37	Rustenburg	18,333	2,585.25	90.4
Dr Kenneth Kaunda District Municipality	DC40	Klerksdorp	14,671	742,821	50.6
Dr Ruth Segomotsi Mompati District Municipality	DC39	Vryburg	43,764	459,357	10.5
Ngaka Modiri Molema District Municipality	DC38	Mahikeng	28,114	889,108	31.6

== Local municipalities ==
Name	Code	District	Seat	Area (km^{2})	Population (2016)	Pop. density (per km^{2})
City of Matlosana Local Municipality	NW403	Dr Kenneth Kaunda	Klerksdorp	3,602	417,282	115.8
Ditsobotla Local Municipality	NW384	Ngaka Modiri Molema	Lichtenburg	6,387	181,865	28.5
Greater Taung Local Municipality	NW394	Dr Ruth Segomotsi Mompati	Taung	5,639	167,827	29.8
JB Marks Local Municipality	NW405	Dr Kenneth Kaunda	Potchefstroom	6,398	243,527	38.1
Kagisano-Molopo Local Municipality	NW397	Dr Ruth Segomotsi Mompati	Ganyesa	23,827	102,703	4.3
Kgetlengrivier Local Municipality	NW374	Bojanala Platinum	Koster	3,973	59,562	15.0
Lekwa-Teemane Local Municipality	NW396	Dr Ruth Segomotsi Mompati	Christiana	3,654	56,025	15.3
Madibeng Local Municipality	NW372	Bojanala Platinum	Brits	3,720	536,110	144.1
Mahikeng Local Municipality	NW383	Ngaka Modiri Molema	Mahikeng	3,646	314,394	86.2
Mamusa Local Municipality	NW393	Dr Ruth Segomotsi Mompati	Schweizer-Reneke	3,614	64,000	17.7
Maquassi Hills Local Municipality	NW404	Dr Kenneth Kaunda	Wolmaransstad	4,671	82,012	17.6
Moretele Local Municipality	NW371	Bojanala Platinum	Makapanstad	1,498	191,306	127.7
Moses Kotane Local Municipality	NW375	Bojanala Platinum	Mogwase	5,726	243,648	42.5
Naledi Local Municipality	NW392	Dr Ruth Segomotsi Mompati	Vryburg	7,030	68,803	9.8
Ramotshere Moiloa Local Municipality	NW385	Ngaka Modiri Molema	Zeerust	7,323	157,690	21.5
Ratlou Local Municipality	NW381	Ngaka Modiri Molema	Setlagole	4,884	106,108	21.7
Rustenburg Local Municipality	NW373	Bojanala Platinum	Rustenburg	3,416	626,522	183.4
Tswaing Local Municipality	NW382	Ngaka Modiri Molema	Delareyville	5,875	129,052	22.0
