= Bohlabela District Municipality =

Coordinates: 24°10′S 31°20′E

Bohlabela District Municipality was a cross-border municipality that was decommissioned by the 12th amendment of the Constitution of South Africa in 2005. The northern part of the district municipality was in Limpopo while the southern part was in Mpumalanga and it included the Kruger National Park. It included the Maruleng Local Municipality, the Bushbuckridge Local Municipality and the Kruger National Park managerial district.

After the 12th amendment was approved in December 2005, the Maruleng Local Municipality was made part of the Mopani District Municipality in Limpopo province while the Bushbuckridge Local Municipality was made part of the Ehlanzeni District Municipality in Mpumalanga province. The Kruger National Park also ceased to be a managerial district (the section north of the Olifants River was declared part of Mopani in Limpopo while the section south of the river was declared part of Ehlanzeni in Mpumalanga).
