= Mthonjaneni Local Municipality =

Coordinates: 28°34′48″S 31°22′48″E

Mthonjaneni
- Local municipality
- Seal

- Location in KwaZulu-Natal
- Country: South Africa
- Province: KwaZulu-Natal
- District: King Cetshwayo
- Seat: Melmoth
- Wards: 13

Government
  - Type: Municipal council
  - Mayor: Mr Mbangiseni Biyela

Area
  - Total: 1,086 km^{2} (419 sq mi)

Population (2011)
  - Total: 47,818
  - Density: 44.03/km^{2} (114.0/sq mi)

Racial makeup (2011)
  - Black African: 98.5%
  - Coloured: 0.4%
  - Indian/Asian: 0.2%
  - White: 0.7%

First languages (2011)
  - Zulu: 93.8%
  - English: 1.7%
  - Southern Ndebele: 1.5%
  - Other: 3%
- Time zone: UTC+2 (SAST)
- Municipal code: KZN285

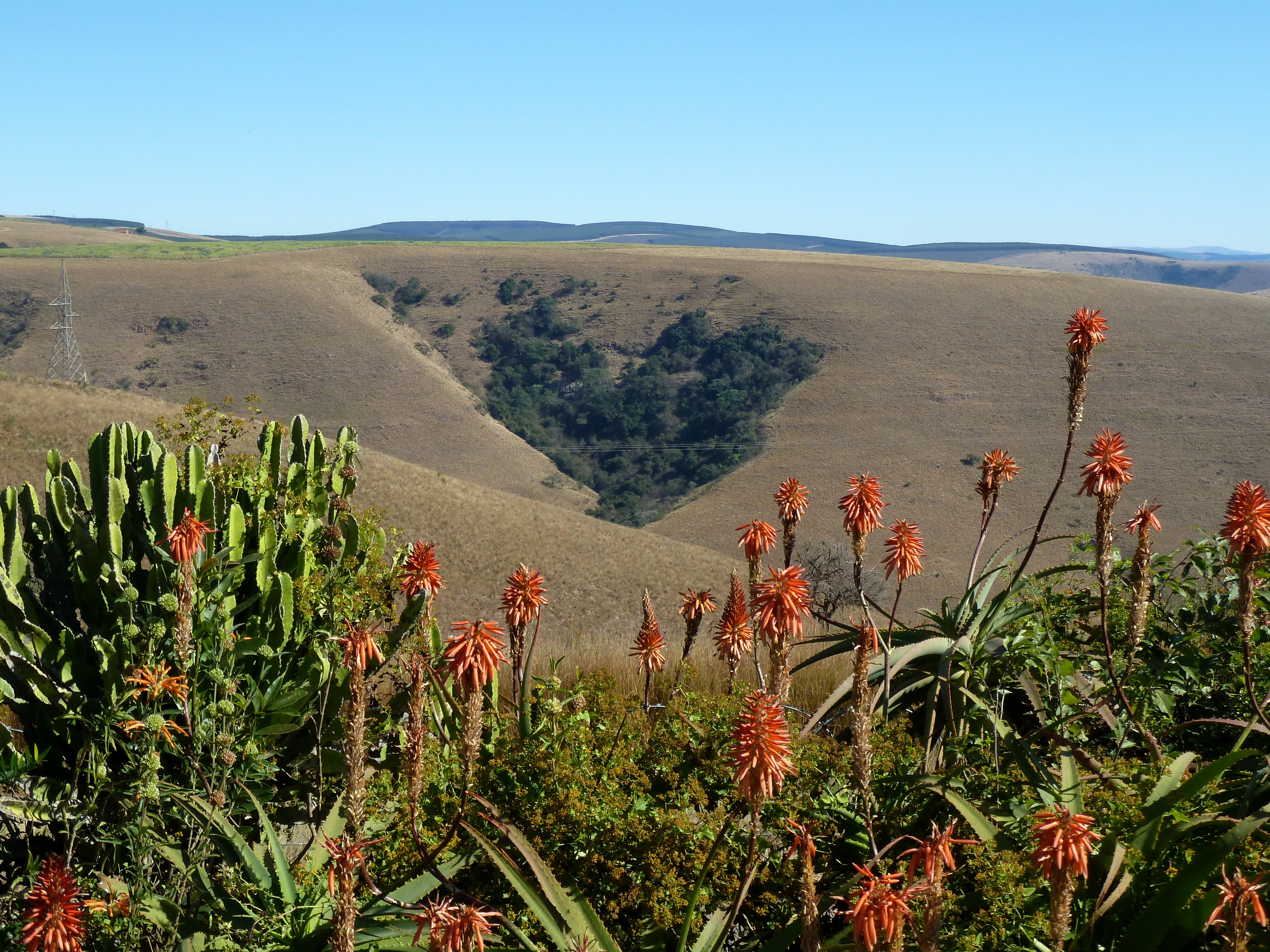
The Mthonjaneni heights at the northern limit of the municipality

Mthonjaneni is an administrative area in the King Cetshwayo District of KwaZulu-Natal in South Africa.

Mthonjaneni is an isiZulu name meaning "a spring of water". There is a spring found in the vicinity of the municipality where King Dingaan used to send his maidens to collect water for him.

The municipality was enlarged at the time of the South African municipal election, 2016 when part of the disbanded Ntambanana Local Municipality was merged into it.

== Main places ==
The 2001 census divided the municipality into the following main places:

Place	Code	Area (km^{2})	Population
Biyela Kwanguye	54101	8.25	1,560
Entembeni	54102	271.17	24,886
Kwanguye	54103	6.30	517
Melmoth	54104	12.10	1,816
Mnanyando	54105	17.64	3,794
Obuka	54107	22.88	1,902
Thubalethu	54108	1.34	5,137
Yanguya	54109	73.57	5,430
Remainder of the municipality	54106	672.29	5,329

== Politics ==
The municipal council consists of twenty-five members elected by mixed-member proportional representation. Thirteen councillors are elected by first-past-the-post voting in thirteen wards, while the remaining twelve are chosen from party lists so that the total number of party representatives is proportional to the number of votes received.

In the election of 4 November 2026 the Inkatha Freedom Party (IFP) retained the majority it had won in the by-elections following the previous election.

The following table shows the results of the 2021 election.

Party	Ward			List			Total seats
Party	Votes	%	Seats	Votes	%	Seats	Total seats
Inkatha Freedom Party	14,254	58.31	13	14,221	58.26	2	15
uMkhonto weSizwe Party	5,754	23.54	0	5,882	24.10	6	6
African National Congress	2,805	11.47	0	2,751	11.27	3	3
Umkhumbi Wesizwe Organisation	718	2.94	0	726	2.97	1	1
Independent candidates	184	0.75	0				0
8 other parties	730	2.99	0	828	3.39	0	0
Total	24,445	100.00	13	24,408	100.00	12	25
Valid votes	24,445	98.84		24,408	98.71		
Invalid/blank votes	287	1.16		319	1.29		
Total votes	24,732	100.00		24,727	100.00		
Registered voters/turnout	49,954	49.51		49,954	49.50		
