= UMhlathuze Local Municipality =

Coordinates: 28°45′S 31°54′E

uMhlathuze
- Local municipality
- Seal

- Location in KwaZulu-Natal
- Country: South Africa
- Province: KwaZulu-Natal
- District: King Cetshwayo
- Seat: Richards Bay
- Wards: 36

Government
  - Type: Municipal council

Area
  - Total: 793 km^{2} (306 sq mi)

Population (2022)
  - Total: 412,075
  - Density: 520/km^{2} (1,350/sq mi)

Racial makeup (2022)
  - Black African: 87.7%
  - Coloured: 0.9%
  - Indian/Asian: 3.7%
  - White: 7.5%

First languages (2022)
  - Zulu: 61.3%
  - English: 19.7%
  - Afrikaans: 15.1%
  - Southern Ndebele: 1.2%
  - Other: 2.7%
- Time zone: UTC+2 (SAST)
- Municipal code: KZN282

uMhlathuze Local Municipality is an administrative area in the King Cetshwayo District Municipality of KwaZulu-Natal in South Africa. The municipality is named after the Mhlatuze River.

The municipality was enlarged at the time of the South African municipal election, 2016 when part of the disbanded Ntambanana Local Municipality was merged into it.

== Main places ==
The 2024 census divided the municipality into the following main places:

Place	Code	Area (km^{2})	Population
Bejani	53801	12.82	4,654
Dube	53802	53.95	52,239
Empangeni	53803	14.00	13,306
Esikhawini	53804	5.90	32,437
Khoza	53805	14.32	24,172
Kwambonambi Forest Reserve	53806	56.58	117
Mkhwanazi	53807	66.29	22,758
Nkwanazi	53808	31.86	25,780
Nseleni	53809	1.30	8,873
Richards Bay Part 1	53810	75.80	30,605
Richards Bay Part 2	53811	0.42	382
Richards Bay Part 3	53812	21.19	13,865
Umlalazi Nature Reserve	53814	27.89	347
Vulindlela	53815	2.44	4,044
Zungu/Madlebe	53816	71.06	48,977
Remainder of the municipality	53813	339.73	6,630

== Politics ==
The municipal council consists of seventy-one members elected by mixed-member proportional representation. Thirty-six councillors are elected by first-past-the-post voting in thirty-six wards, while the remaining thirty-five are chosen from party lists so that the total number of party representatives is proportional to the number of votes received.

In the 2026 South African municipal elections the uMkhonto weSizwe Party (MKP) won a plurality of twenty-seven seats on the council.

This table shows the election results of the 2026 South African municipal elections.

Party	Ward			List			Total seats
Party	Votes	%	Seats	Votes	%	Seats	Total seats
uMkhonto weSizwe Party	41,807	36.83	23	44,312	38.97	4	27
Inkatha Freedom Party	27,886	24.57	6	27,833	24.48	12	18
African National Congress	19,982	17.60	2	17,935	15.77	10	12
Democratic Alliance	13,328	11.74	5	13,436	11.82	4	9
ActionSA	2,250	1.98	0	2,607	2.29	2	2
Economic Freedom Fighters	2,218	1.95	0	2,092	1.84	1	1
Freedom Front Plus	1,644	1.45	0	1,686	1.48	1	1
National Freedom Party	1,055	0.93	0	1,074	0.94	1	1
Independent candidates	687	0.61	0				0
15 other parties	2,660	2.34	0	2,743	2.41	0	0
Total	113,517	100.00	36	113,718	100.00	35	71
Valid votes	113,517	99.13		113,718	99.13		
Invalid/blank votes	993	0.87		999	0.87		
Total votes	114,510	100.00		114,717	100.00		
Registered voters/turnout	218,080	52.51		218,080	52.60		

=== Mayors ===
- Mayor Denny Moffatt, 2000 - 2006 (IFP)
- Mayor Zakhele Mnqayi, 2006 - 2011 (ANC)
- Mayor Elphas Mbatha, 2011 - 2015 (ANC)
- Mayor Mduduzi Mhlongo, 2015 - 2021 (ANC)
- Mayor Dr. Nkonzoyakhe Donda, 2021 - 2021 (IFP)
- Mayor Cllr. Xolani Ngwezi, 2021 – 2026 (IFP)
