= UMfolozi Local Municipality =

Coordinates: 28°48′S 32°06′E

uMfolozi Mbonambi
- Local municipality
- Seal

- Location in KwaZulu-Natal
- Country: South Africa
- Province: KwaZulu-Natal
- District: King Cetshwayo
- Seat: KwaMbonambi
- Wards: 18

Government
  - Type: Municipal council
  - Mayor: Cllr Xolani Bhengu

Area
  - Total: 1,210 km^{2} (470 sq mi)

Population (2011)
  - Total: 122,889
  - Density: 102/km^{2} (263/sq mi)

Racial makeup (2011)
  - Black African: 98.8%
  - Coloured: 0.2%
  - Indian/Asian: 0.2%
  - White: 0.8%

First languages (2011)
  - Zulu: 92.6%
  - English: 2.9%
  - Southern Ndebele: 1.5%
  - Other: 3%
- Time zone: UTC+2 (SAST)
- Municipal code: KZN281

uMfolozi Local Municipality (formerly Mbonambi Local Municipality) is a local municipality within the King Cetshwayo District Municipality of KwaZulu-Natal in South Africa. It is situated around the town of KwaMbonambi, to the north of Richard's Bay, stretching from the Indian Ocean to the edge of the Hluhluwe–Imfolozi Park.

It was originally named Mbonambi Local Municipality, renamed to Mfolozi Local Municipality on 21 May 2009, and renamed again to uMfolozi Local Municipality on 12 February 2015. The name "Mbonambi" refers to the Mbonambi Local Tribal Authority, which covers most of the municipal area. The name Mfolozi/uMfolozi refers to the Umfolozi River which forms the northern boundary of the municipality.

The municipality was enlarged at the time of the South African municipal election, 2016 when part of the disbanded Ntambanana Local Municipality was merged into it.

== Main places ==
The 2001 census divided the municipality into the following main places:

Place	Code	Area (km^{2})	Population
Kwambonambi Forest Reserve	53702	62.25	222
KwaMbonambi	53701	2.35	1,894
Mapelane Nature Reserve	53703	52.78	54
Mbonambi	53704	86.04	22,984
Mhlana	53705	515.65	64,527
Sokhulu	53706	98.17	12,632
Remainder of the municipality	53707	391.24	4,623

== Politics ==
The municipal council consists of thirty-five members elected by mixed-member proportional representation. Eighteen councillors are elected by first-past-the-post voting in eighteen wards, while the remaining seventeen are chosen from party lists so that the total number of party representatives is proportional to the number of votes received.

In the election of 4 November 2026 the Inkatha Freedom Party (IFP) lost its majority, but remained the largest party on the council, with sixteen seats.

The following table shows the results of the 2026 election.

Party	Ward			List			Total seats
Party	Votes	%	Seats	Votes	%	Seats	Total seats
Inkatha Freedom Party	20,654	44.97	12	20,635	45.02	4	16
uMkhonto weSizwe Party	14,432	31.43	4	15,302	33.38	7	11
African National Congress	8,116	17.67	2	6,975	15.22	4	6
Economic Freedom Fighters	851	1.85	0	820	1.79	1	1
Democratic Alliance	538	1.17	0	619	1.35	1	1
11 other parties	1,334	2.90	0	1,486	3.24	0	0
Total	45,925	100.00	18	45,837	100.00	17	35
Valid votes	45,925	98.62		45,837	98.51		
Invalid/blank votes	644	1.38		691	1.49		
Total votes	46,569	100.00		46,528	100.00		
Registered voters/turnout	81,079	57.44		81,079	57.39		
