= King Cetshwayo District Municipality =

Coordinates: 28°44′S 32°05′E

King Cetshwayo uThungulu
- District municipality
- Seal

- Location in South Africa
- Country: South Africa
- Province: KwaZulu-Natal
- Seat: Richards Bay
- Local municipalities: List: Mbonambi; uMhlathuze; Ntambanana; uMlalazi; Mthonjaneni; Nkandla

Government
  - Type: Municipal council
  - Mayor: Vacant

Area
  - Total: 8,213 km^{2} (3,171 sq mi)

Population (2011)
  - Total: 907,519
  - Density: 110.5/km^{2} (286.2/sq mi)

Racial makeup (2011)
  - Black African: 94.4%
  - Coloured: 0.6%
  - Indian/Asian: 1.6%
  - White: 3.2%

First languages (2011)
  - Zulu: 89.1%
  - English: 5.1%
  - Afrikaans: 2.3%
  - Southern Ndebele: 1.3%
  - Other: 2.2%
- Time zone: UTC+2 (SAST)
- Municipal code: DC28

King Cetshwayo District Municipality (formerly Uthungulu District Municipality) is one of the 11 district municipalities ("districts") of KwaZulu-Natal province in South Africa. The seat of the district is Richards Bay. The majority of its 885 944 people speak Zulu (2001 Census). The district code is DC28. It is named after Cetshwayo kaMpande, King of the Zulu Kingdom from 1872 to 1879, who led his nation to victory against the British in the Battle of Isandlwana.

== Geography ==
=== Neighbours ===
King Cetshwayo District is surrounded by:

- iLembe to the south (DC29)
- Umkhanyakude to the northeast (DC27)
- The Indian Ocean to the east
- Umzinyathi to the west (DC24)
- Zululand to the north (DC26)

=== Local municipalities ===
The district contains the following local municipalities:

Local municipality	Population	%
uMhlathuze	289 187	32.64%
Umlalazi	221 077	24.95%
Nkandla	133 596	15.08%
Mbonambi	106 949	12.07%
Ntambanana	84 772	9.57%
Mthonjaneni	50 382	5.69%

== Demographics ==
The following statistics are from the South African National Census of 2011.

Language	Population	%
Zulu	797 545	89.11%
English	45 573	5.09%
Afrikaans	20 290	2.27%
Ndebele	11 801	1.32%
Tswana	5 771	0.64%
Northern Sotho	1 989	0.22%
isiXhosa	1 967	0.22%
Other	3 482	0.39%
Sotho	1 238	0.14%
Tsonga	730	0.08%
Swati	709	0.08%
Venda	452	0.05%

=== Gender ===
Gender	Population	%
Female	480 122	52.90%
Male	427 397	47.10%

=== Ethnic group ===
Ethnic group	Population	%
Black African	856 997	94.43%
White	29 375	3.24%
Indian/Asian	14 362	1.61%
Coloured	5 027	0.55%

=== Age ===
Age	Population	%
000 - 004	105 292	11.88%
005 - 009	117 338	13.24%
010 - 014	116 678	13.17%
015 - 019	111 828	12.62%
020 - 024	83 146	9.39%
025 - 029	70 038	7.91%
030 - 034	53 829	6.08%
035 - 039	49 667	5.61%
040 - 044	42 568	4.80%
045 - 049	32 552	3.67%
050 - 054	26 991	3.05%
055 - 059	18 608	2.10%
060 - 064	18 550	2.09%
065 - 069	13 065	1.47%
070 - 074	11 970	1.35%
075 - 079	6 094	0.69%
080 - 084	4 904	0.55%
085 - 089	1 458	0.16%
090 - 094	767	0.09%
095 - 099	475	0.05%
100 plus	126	0.01%

== Sister City ==
King Cetshwayo District is officially a sister city of Milwaukee, Wisconsin, USA ( Milwaukee, United States). The joining of the two cities was largely enacted from legislation in Wisconsin in collaboration with the Africa Urban Poverty Alleviation Program. In 2009, Sister Cities International launched the Africa Urban Poverty Alleviation Program, a three-year project to alleviate poverty in 25 African cities (including King Cetshwayo District) through water, sanitation and health initiatives. Milwaukee will collaborate with their African counterparts to identify and address the most critical problems in these sectors, which form barriers to sustained development in urban areas. This project is funded by a $7.5 million grant from the Bill & Melinda Gates Foundation. The program is cited to end in middle of the year 2012.

== Politics ==
=== Election results ===
Election results for uThungulu (King Cetshwayo District) in the South African general election, 2004.

- Population 18 and over: 477 576 [53.91% of total population]
- Total votes: 252 139 [28.46% of total population]
- Voting % estimate: 52.80% votes as a % of population 18 and over

Party	Votes	%
Inkhata Freedom Party	150 187	59.57%
African National Congress	76 503	30.34%
Democratic Alliance	14 556	5.77%
African Christian Democratic Party	3 553	1.41%
United Democratic Movement	1 791	0.71%
Freedom Front Plus	773	0.31%
Independent Democrats	666	0.26%
New National Party	633	0.25%
Azanian People's Organisation	591	0.23%
Pan African Congress	419	0.17%
SOPA	306	0.12%
CDP	304	0.12%
United Christian Democratic Party	283	0.11%
KISS	253	0.10%
Minority Front	249	0.10%
UF	241	0.10%
EMSA	207	0.08%
PJC	200	0.08%
NA	172	0.07%
TOP	156	0.06%
NLP	96	0.04%
Total	252 139	100.00%

== See also ==
- Municipal Demarcation Board
