= Utrecht, South Africa =

Utrecht
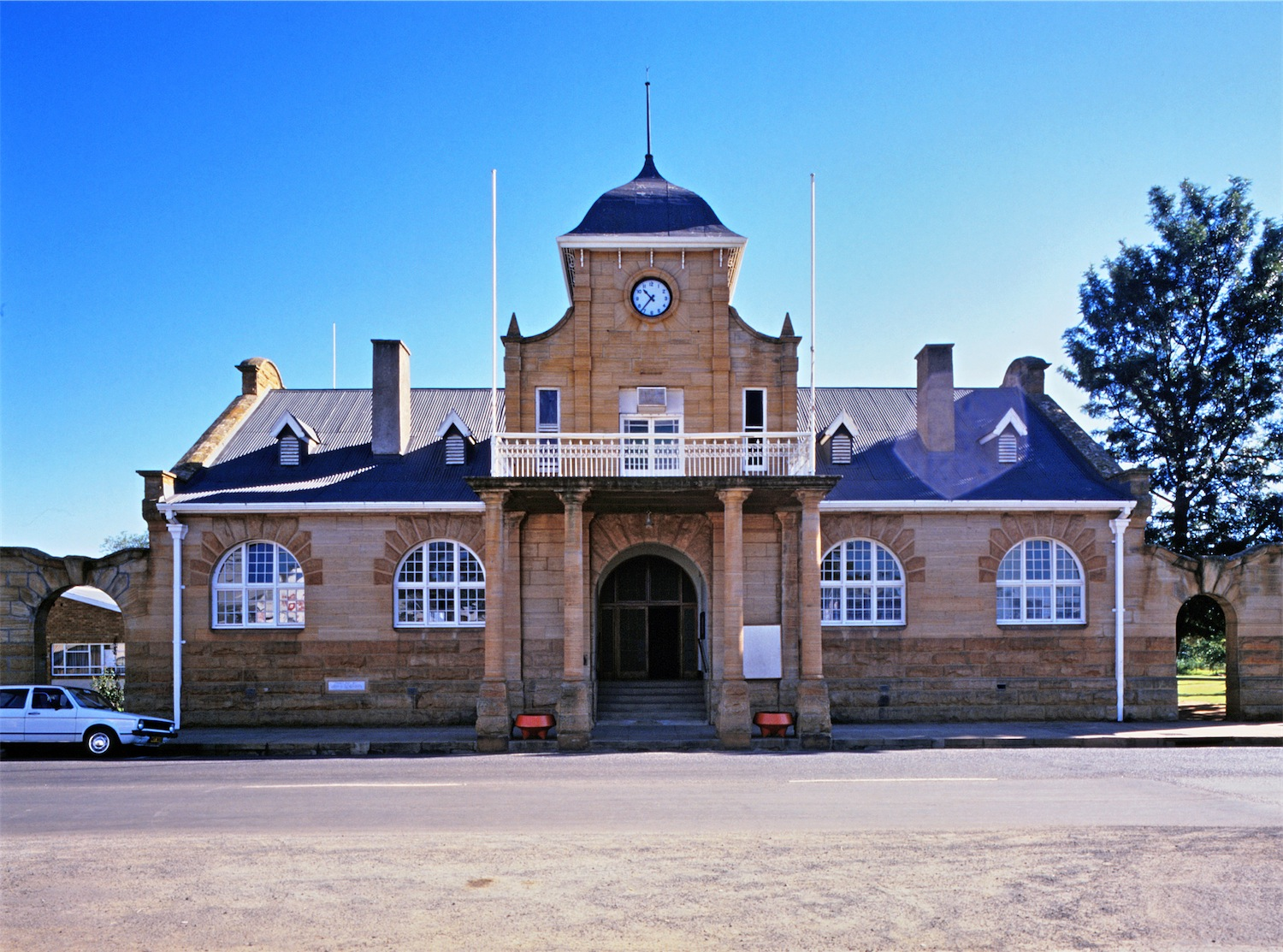
- Town Hall in Utrecht, KwaZulu-Natal.

- Location within KwaZulu-Natal Location within South Africa
- Coordinates: 27°39′36″S 30°19′48″E
- Country: South Africa
- Province: KwaZulu-Natal
- District: Amajuba
- Municipality: eMadlangeni
- Established: 1853

Area
  - Total: 57.76 km^{2} (22.30 sq mi)

Population (2026)
  - Total: 5,542
  - Density: 95.95/km^{2} (248.5/sq mi)

Racial makeup (2022)
  - Black African: 41.3%
  - Coloured: 6.9%
  - Indian/Asian: 0.3%
  - White: 50.5%
  - Other: 1.1%

First languages (2022)
  - Zulu: 36.1%
  - Afrikaans: 54.2%
  - English: 15.2%
  - Other: 4.5%
- Time zone: UTC+2 (SAST)
- Postal code (street): 2980
- PO box: 2980
- Area code: 034
- Website: http://www.utrecht.co.za

Utrecht is a town in the foothills of the Balele Mountains, in the northwestern corner of KwaZulu-Natal, South Africa. Newcastle, Kwazulu-Natal's third-largest urban centre, is 50 km from Utrecht. Utrecht has a population of approximately 32,000 (including surrounding areas).

The town is named after Utrecht, a Dutch city with the same name, as a result from Dutch settlers in the region.

Coal mining and cattle ranching are the predominant economic activities in Utrecht.

== History ==
The majority of northern Natal was intermittently uninhabited, since King Shaka had driven out the resident Hlubi people; the Zulu people inhabited the land generally.

In 1852 a small group of Boer settlers who wished to remain free of the British and who had left the earlier Klip River Republic and already had n agreement to use the land for grazing signed an agreement with the Zulu King Mpande to form the Utrecht Republic, although they were not recognized by the neighbouring and larger Boer Transvaal Republic. In 1858 the Republic merged with the Republic of Lydenburg and they were both inforporated int the South African Republic (ZAR) in 1860.

The flag of the Netherlands served as the flag of the short lived Utrecht Republic

During the Boer War Utrecht remained part of the ZAR until 31 May 1902, when the ZAR surrendered to Great Britain. After this, both towns (and their districts) were incorporated into the Colony of Natal as spoils of war.

== Tourism ==
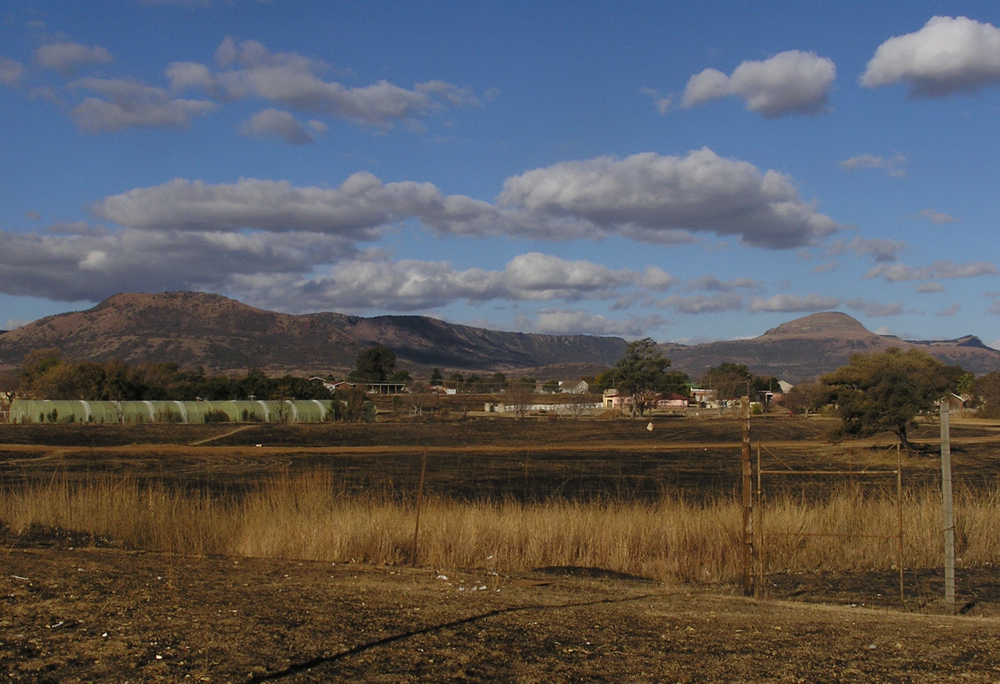
Balele Mountains rising behind Utrecht.

In a corner of the Balele Mountains, Utrecht is unique since it lies within a game park. Established in 1854, the town is steeped in a history reflected in historical buildings like the Old Parsonage Museum, the Dutch Reformed sandstone church, the old military cemetery, colonial houses and other buildings.

Utrecht does not only offer history to the tourist; the Balele Mountains, with their waterfalls and ecological diversity, are home to a wealth of fauna and flora – especially in the Balele Game Park, which encircles the town. The preserve and surrounding district offer a variety of outdoor activities that include hiking and horse trails, trout fishing at dams on the Bivane River, birding and water sports at the recreation resort.

The Utrecht district is the tribal domain of five Amakosi (Zulu chiefs), who today play an active role in the development of the area. The Mangosuthu Arts and Crafts village (with accommodations for backpackers) has a craft shop with a variety of traditional Zulu articles.

In addition to eco-tourism Utrecht is an agricultural area, the most important wool-producing area in KwaZulu-Natal. It is also a major cattle and mixed-farming region, and farm holidays are available.

== Population ==
Utrecht is the seat of the local eMadlageni municipality and the Amajuba District Municipality. The Amajuba District Municipality is the fifth-most-densely-populated district in KwaZulu-Natal, comprising Dannhauser (1,516 km^{2}), Newcastle (1,855 km^{2}), and Utrecht (3,539 km^{2}). The average population density in Amajuba was 72 people per km^{2} in 2011. The district was home to 499,839 people that year with 22% residing in Dannhauser, 72% residing in Newcastle and 7% in Utrecht. Best place for farming as well. 2025 updates, black African increasing with 10% from 2022.

== Schools ==
- Utrecht High School
- Utrecht Primary School
- eMalahleni Combined School
- Zimbuthu Primary School
- UMzilikazi High School
- Ithamsanqa Primary School
- Mxhakeni Primary School
- Ndwakazana Combined school
- Waaihoek primary school

== Bibliography ==
- Ian Knight, Companion to the Anglo-Zulu War, 2008.
- Roy Digby Thomas, Two Generals: Buller and Botha in the Boer War, 2012.
