= Osizweni =

Mountain View Mawunteni
- Osizweni
- Location within KwaZulu-Natal Location within South Africa
- Coordinates: 27°47′S 30°09′E
- Country: South Africa
- Province: KwaZulu-Natal
- District: Amajuba
- Municipality: Newcastle

Area
  - Total: 15.34 km^{2} (5.92 sq mi)

Population (2011)
  - Total: 77,845
  - Density: 5,075/km^{2} (13,140/sq mi)

Racial makeup (2011)
  - Black African: 99.4%
  - Coloured: 0.2%
  - Indian/Asian: 0.2%
  - White: 0.1%
  - Other: 0.1%

First languages (2011)
  - Zulu: 94.9%
  - English: 1.1%
  - S. Ndebele: 1.1%
  - Other: 2.9%
- Time zone: UTC+2 (SAST)
- Postal code (street): 2952
- PO box: 2952
- Area code: 034

Osizweni, is a township in Newcastle, KwaZulu-Natal, South Africa, situated 24 kilometres (15 mi) from Newcastle CBD. Osizweni is one of the largest townships in the province, with an estimated population of 80, 000 people.

== Sections ==
The township has 6 different sections:

- Section A consists of these areas Top Rank, Ema 4, Evezi, Ward 5
- Section B Mlazi
- Section C Ematsheketsheni
- Section D Emaskophasini
- Section E Long Homes
- Section F Ematshotshombeni

== Amenities ==
Four government-owned medical clinics serve the community of Osizweni and surrounding area. The Osizweni Medical Centre was recently opened with three doctors. There is a SASSA office in the middle of the township.

== Retail ==
Osizweni Shopping Centre is situated at the heart of the township.

Recently a new shopping complex was built between Osizweni and Madadeni in eTheku.

== Sports and recreation ==
Osizweni has a soccer stadium, netball courts, a cricket stadium, and the Osizweni Park. There is one library in the township.

== Safety and security ==
There is one police station in the township. Osizweni Police Station has overnight cells and is situated behind to Osizweni Community Hall and Osizweni Library.

== Notable residents ==
=== Sportspeople ===
- Siyabonga Nkosi, soccer player
- Sizwe Motaung, soccer player
- Helman Mkhalele, soccer player
- Fani Madida, soccer player
- Mark Fish, soccer player
- Sifiso Sandile "Choppa" Hlanti, soccer player

=== Entertainers ===
- Bonginkosi "Zola" Dlamini
- Lucky Dube, reggae musician
