= Sandile Khubeka =

South African doctor

Sandile Kubheka is one of South Africa's youngest doctors completing his medical degree at the University of KwaZulu-Natal at the age of 20.

== Early life ==
Sandile Kubheka was born on 1 January 1994 in Newcastle, KwaZulu-Natal, raised by his mother alongside his four siblings. He started school at the age of 5 and completed matric at the age of 15, in Siyamukela High School. He then enrolled at the University of KwaZulu-Natal's Nelson Rolihlahla Mandela School for medicine where he served in the Rural Development Club, in the Happy Valley Clinic and in the Medical Student's Representative Council. He volunteered much of his time, providing free medical treatment and advice to rural communities attending the Happy Valley Clinic and Madadeni hospital.

== Career ==
Kubheka is serving his internship at Grey's Hospital in Pietermaritzburg and hopes to eventually register for Masters of Medicine degree, specialising in Internal Medicine and to specialise in Endocrinology, later in future. He is in the process of launching a trust fund with his medical classmates, which will focus on mentorship, and giving scholarship to learners that come from under-privileged backgrounds.

== Awards ==
His class of 2013 voted him as what 'the next Minister of Health' South Africa should be on the lookout. Secondly, he was selected by his classmates to receive the Yashim Sham Bursary for having compassion and caring qualities, and for the Enid Gordon Jacob Good fellowship Prize for character and good conduct. He recently graduated and was ecstatic to be the youngest graduate in his profession, and to have also attained a distinction in Obstetrics and Gynaecology. He was nominated for the health personality award at the 2016 Africa Youth Awards. A Pietermaritzburg doctor has been voted into fourth spot in a poll of the most influential South Africans. Lastly, he was voted first in the Science and Technology category.

== Relationships ==
Kubheka has a strong relationship with his mother and siblings, and he claims that he had a humble upbringing and that his mother has always been there to give him guidance and wisdom. He loves working especially with the disadvantaged that often do not have easy access to medical treatment. The young man enjoys giving back to the community and working with different organisations to help people to better themselves. He believes that by grooming young minds that is how we get a successful society because they can teach the next generation and also the mature generation.
