= Ngagane =

- Location within KwaZulu-Natal Location within South Africa
- Coordinates: 27.840°S 29.992°E
- Country: South Africa
- Province: KwaZulu-Natal
- District: Amajuba
- Municipality: Newcastle

Area
  - Total: 0.74 km^{2} (0.29 sq mi)

Population (2011)
  - Total: 906
  - Density: 1,200/km^{2} (3,200/sq mi)

Racial makeup (2011)
  - Black African: 87.6%
  - Coloured: 0.2%
  - White: 12.1%

First languages (2011)
  - Zulu: 83.9%
  - Afrikaans: 8.1%
  - English: 5.8%
  - Other: 2.2%
- Time zone: UTC+2 (SAST)

Ngagane is a remote village in Amajuba District Municipality in the KwaZulu-Natal province of South Africa.

Ingagane Village was established in the late 1950s to accommodate employees of the Ingagane Power Station, which was under construction by ESCOM (now known as Eskom). In conjunction with the power station's development, ESCOM built a residential village comprising 320 houses to accommodate the employees of Ingagane. By 1963, the power station was completed and ready for commissioning, meeting its scheduled deadline. The village has since become a thriving community, closely tied to the history and operation of the Ingagane Power Station.
