= Groenvlei, KwaZulu-Natal =

Groenvlei
- Location within KwaZulu-Natal Location within South Africa
- Coordinates: 27.460°S 30.229°E
- Country: South Africa
- Province: KwaZulu-Natal
- District: Amajuba
- Municipality: eMadlangeni

Area
  - Total: 1.29 km^{2} (0.50 sq mi)

Population (2011)
  - Total: 193
  - Density: 150/km^{2} (387/sq mi)

Racial makeup (2011)
  - Black African: 100.0%

First languages (2011)
  - Zulu: 99.0%
  - Other: 1.0%
- Time zone: UTC+2 (SAST)
- Postal code (street): 7780

Groenvlei is a town in Emadlangeni Local Municipality in the KwaZulu-Natal province of South Africa.
