= Groenvlei =

This can mean more than one place in South Africa:

- Groenvlei, KwaZulu-Natal
- Groenvlei, Western Cape
