= Amajuba =

Amajuba may refer to:

- Amajuba District Municipality, KwaZulu-Natal, South Africa
- Majuba Hill, near Volksrust, Mpumalanga, South Africa, best known for the Battle of Majuba Hill
