= Newcastle Airport (South Africa) =

- IATA: NCS; ICAO: FANC

Summary
- Airport type: Public
- Location: Newcastle, KwaZulu-Natal in South Africa
- Elevation AMSL: 4,074 ft / 1,242 m
- Coordinates: 27.770902°S 29.978036°E
- Interactive map of Newcastle Airport (South Africa)
- Source: IATA, SACAA, SkyVector

Newcastle Airport (IATA: NCS, ICAO: FANC) is located in the city of Newcastle, KwaZulu-Natal in South Africa. The facility is approximately 7 kilometres (4.3 mi) from the city centre.
