= Newcastle Local Municipality =

Coordinates: 27°44′39″S 29°56′14″E

Newcastle
- Local municipality
- Seal

- Location in KwaZulu-Natal
- Country: South Africa
- Province: KwaZulu-Natal
- District: Amajuba
- Seat: Newcastle
- Wards: 36

Government
  - Type: Municipal council

Area
  - Total: 1,855 km^{2} (716 sq mi)

Population (2011)
  - Total: 363,236
  - Density: 195.8/km^{2} (507.2/sq mi)

Racial makeup (2011)
  - Black African: 91.9%
  - Coloured: 0.8%
  - Indian/Asian: 3.2%
  - White: 3.9%

First languages (2011)
  - Zulu: 85.6%
  - English: 6.4%
  - Afrikaans: 3.5%
  - Other: 4.5%
- Time zone: UTC+2 (SAST)
- Municipal code: KZN252

Newcastle Municipality (Zulu: UMasipala wase Newcastle) is a local municipality within the Amajuba District Municipality, in the KwaZulu-Natal province of South Africa.

== Main places ==
The 2001 census divided the municipality into the following main places:

Place	Code	Area (km^{2})	Population
Charlestown	52401	18.48	3,204
Hlubi	52402	108.11	73,931
Madadeni	52403	25.15	116,798
Newcastle	52404	199.06	44,123
Ngagane	52405	4.90	1,206
Osizweni	52406	15.35	80,265
Remainder of the municipality	52408	1,483.87	13,449

== Politics ==
The municipal council consists of seventy-one members elected by mixed-member proportional representation. Thirty-six councillors are elected by first-past-the-post voting in thirty-six wards, while the remaining thirty-five are chosen from party lists so that the total number of party representatives is proportional to the number of votes received.

In the election of 4 November 2026 the uMkhonto weSizwe Party won a plurality of 23 seats.

The following table shows the results of the election.

Party	Ward			List			Total seats
Party	Votes	%	Seats	Votes	%	Seats	Total seats
uMkhonto weSizwe Party	32,303	30.96	23	34,689	33.28	0	23
Inkatha Freedom Party	21,341	20.45	5	21,001	20.15	10	15
African National Congress	14,959	14.33	3	14,193	13.62	7	10
Democratic Alliance	9,936	9.52	3	10,342	9.92	4	7
ActionSA	4,862	4.66	0	5,009	4.81	3	3
Newcastle and District Residents Forum	3,981	3.81	2	3,579	3.43	1	3
Economic Freedom Fighters	2,904	2.78	0	2,650	2.54	2	2
International Revelation Congress	2,199	2.11	0	2,462	2.36	2	2
Amandla Awethu Movement	1,855	1.78	0	1,873	1.80	1	1
Freedom Front Plus	1,708	1.64	0	1,942	1.86	1	1
People's Voice Party	1,055	1.01	0	998	0.96	1	1
Independent Alliance	897	0.86	0	755	0.72	1	1
Majuba Progressive Movement	837	0.80	0	732	0.70	1	1
National Freedom Party	637	0.61	0	608	0.58	1	1
Independent candidates	349	0.33	0				0
21 other parties	4,530	4.34	0	3,410	3.27	0	0
Total	104,353	100.00	36	104,243	100.00	35	71
Valid votes	104,353	98.36		104,243	98.61		
Invalid/blank votes	1,740	1.64		1,469	1.39		
Total votes	106,093	100.00		105,712	100.00		
Registered voters/turnout	201,526	52.64		201,526	52.46		

=== Mismanagement and corruption ===
In March 2026, the Hawks raided the municipality following alleged corruption. The municipality had previously agreed to write off R100 million in irregular expenditure without any investigations or consequence management.
