= Qualitas Career Academy =

Private college in South Africa

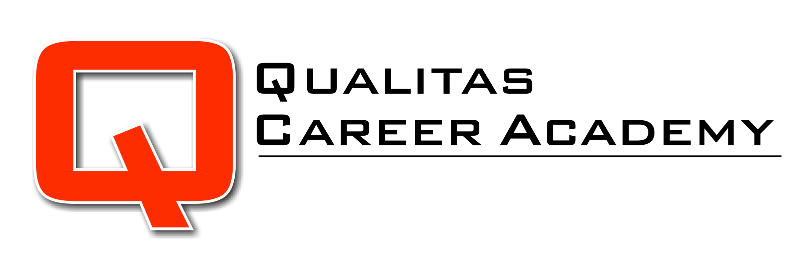
- Motto: Quality Education
- Type: Private College
- Established: 2008
- Location: Bloemfontein; Newcastle

Qualitas Career Academy is a private college in South Africa, with campuses in various provinces. The institution delivers attendance/contact-based tuition in two modalities, namely full-time and part-time. Full-time curriculum is aimed at high school graduates/students acquiring their first qualification. The part-time curriculum centres on skills and knowledge required by those already employed. Training and consultation services are presented to the private and government sector.

== History ==
The organization was founded in 1998. In 2008, its academic division, the "Hair Academy" piloted hairdressing training and hairdressing apprenticeships, and set up smaller campuses in South Africa in 2010. In 2012 additional academic divisions were added.

== Faculties ==
- Beauty & Wellness
- Hairdresser
- Electrician
- Architectural Draughtsmanship

== Accreditation ==
In South Africa, an institute providing private education is required to be accredited. This accreditation should be specific to the institution, site of delivery as well as the actual qualification or part qualification offered. Qualitas Career Academy holds accreditation with the following South African Organisations regulated by acts of parliament that govern education.

- UMALUSI: The Quality Council for General and Further Education & Training
- SSETA: Services Sectoral Education & Training Authority.
- MICT SETA: Media and Information & Communication Technologies Sectoral Education & Training Authority.

== International accreditation / affiliations ==
Various organisations with influence in specialised fields of learning also endorse, examine and/or co-certify certain qualifications or part-qualifications.

- City and Guilds
- ICDL: International Computer Driving Licence
- ITEC: International Therapy Examination Council
