= Madadeni =

- Location within KwaZulu-Natal Location within South Africa
- Coordinates: 27.750°S 30.062°E
- Country: South Africa
- Province: KwaZulu-Natal
- District: Amajuba
- Municipality: Newcastle

Area
  - Total: 27.96 km^{2} (10.80 sq mi)

Population (2011)
  - Total: 119,497
  - Density: 4,274/km^{2} (11,070/sq mi)

Racial makeup (2011)
  - Black African: 99.4%
  - Coloured: 0.2%
  - Indian/Asian: 0.2%
  - White: 0.1%
  - Other: 0.1%

First languages (2011)
  - Zulu: 94.4%
  - English: 1.2%
  - Other: 4.4%
- Time zone: UTC+2 (SAST)
- Postal code (street): 2951
- PO box: 2951
- Area code: 034

Madadeni is a town in Newcastle, KwaZulu-Natal, South Africa, which falls under Amajuba District Municipality. On the outskirts of Newcastle, Madadeni is situated 16 kilometers (9.9 mi) from Newcastle CBD. As of the 2011 census Madadeni has population of 119,497 citizens. Madadeni is divided into subs places referred to as sections Madadeni A-P.

== Education ==
Madadeni has a total of 30 basic education schools, consisting of 20 primary schools and 10 secondary/high schools. Schools in Madadeni include Bethamoya High School, Phendukani High School, Siyamukela High School (one the few government boarding schools in KZN, with both male and female learner intake in it facilities), and Ikhwezi High School. Sabela Senior Secondary School is the only high school situated in Madadeni Section 5.

Madadeni houses two of the eight Majuba College campuses, the Centre For People Development and the Majuba Technology Centre, which focus on Business Studies and Engineering Studies respectively.

== Medical ==
Madadeni houses one of the two government hospitals in Newcastle, the Madadeni Provincial Hospital. Madadeni also has 6 government clinics across the area which are the following: Stafford Clinic, Madadeni Clinic 8, Madadeni Clinic 5, Madadeni Clinic 7, Newcastle PHC and the Madadeni Gate Clinic. There are also many private medical centres in the area like the Empilweni Medical Center and the new Unjani Clinic Madadeni.

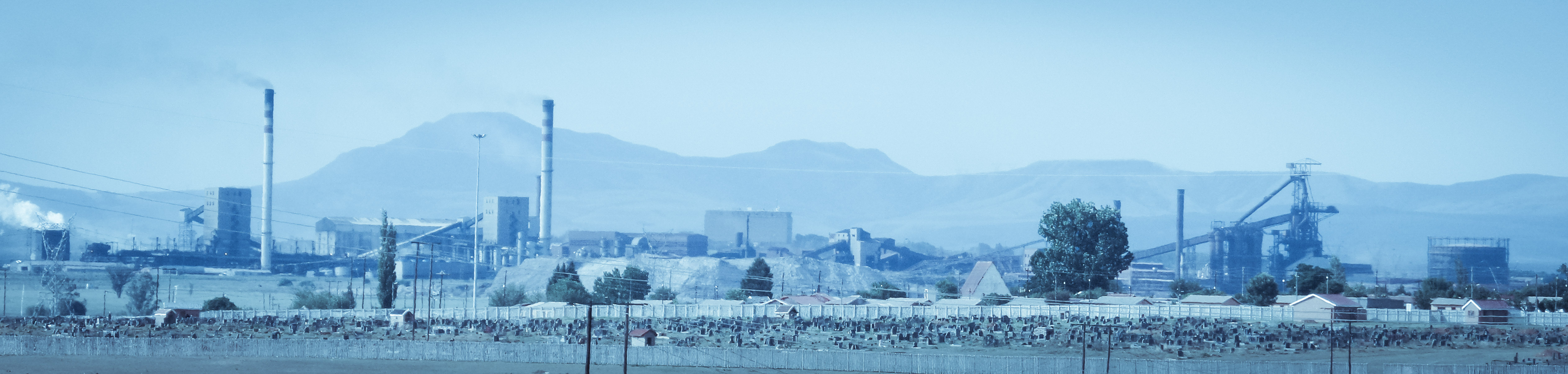
View from Madadeni

== Retail ==
Madadeni is mainly served by the new Eyethu Junction Shopping Centre, opened in October 2023. The shopping centre is anchored by Superspar and Clicks complemented by a variety of restaurants and other stores. There are other shopping centres within the area like the Madadeni Ithala Centre (Shoprite), Mzamo Shopping (Usave) Complex and the Madadeni Cossing (Boxer Madadeni). However, for larger shopping trips, residents need to make the short journey to nearby Newcastle Mall, Equarand.

== Tourism, culture and entertainment ==
Madadeni Library is a free public library within the Newcastle Municipal area, and the only library in Madadeni, next to the Madadeni Community Hall, which includes a significant collection of adult and school-kids' books. Madadeni also has the NATU Centre a concert hall usually hosting teacher rallies and other concert thought the year. There is also the Exclusive bridal Court for wedding and events.

Places of worship in the area include: Roman Catholic Church: Christ The King (with Parishes around Newcastle - Roman Catholic Diocese of Dundee), Old Potter's House Family Church, Holy Faith Mission Evangelical Church, Assemblies Of God "Emthonjeni", Menyezwayo Temple - Nazareth Baptist Church, The Church of Jesus Christ of Latter-day Saints, and the World of Praise Church International, a church with its own radio station Abusekho Ubunzima Christian Radio 100.3 FM, situated in Madadeni Section 4.

== Unrest ==
During 2021's unrest, the Hofina Poultry Shop was vandalised and approximately 25,000 eggs, 10,000 chickens, 700 goats and 500 sheep were stolen. The shop was shut down and later reopened 14 km away with a smaller staff complement. In the wake of the unrest, many locals complained about losing their employment, having to travel further to work, and paying more for some food items.
