= EMadlangeni Local Municipality =

Coordinates: 27°39′S 30°20′E

eMadlangeni
- Local municipality
- Seal

- Location in KwaZulu-Natal
- Country: South Africa
- Province: KwaZulu-Natal
- District: Amajuba
- Seat: Utrecht
- Wards: 6

Government
  - Type: Municipal council
  - Mayor: Lindile Mhlungu

Area
  - Total: 3,539 km^{2} (1,366 sq mi)

Population (2011)
  - Total: 34,442
  - Density: 9.732/km^{2} (25.21/sq mi)

Racial makeup (2011)
  - Black African: 92.7%
  - Coloured: 1.3%
  - Indian/Asian: 0.1%
  - White: 5.7%

First languages (2011)
  - Zulu: 87.9%
  - Afrikaans: 6.1%
  - English: 1.7%
  - Other: 4.3%
- Time zone: UTC+2 (SAST)
- Municipal code: KZN253

eMadlangeni Municipality (Zulu: UMasipala wase Madlangeni), previously known as Utrecht Municipality, is a local municipality within the Amajuba District Municipality, in the KwaZulu-Natal province of South Africa.

== Main places ==
The 2001 census divided the municipality into the following main places:

| Place | Code | Area (km^{2}) | Population |
|---|---|---|---|
| Utrecht | 52503 | 57.60 | 4,365 |
| Waterval | 52502 | 19.01 | 2,948 |
| Remainder of the municipality | 52501 | 3,462.16 | 24,969 |

== Politics ==
The municipal council consists of eleven members elected by mixed-member proportional representation. Six councillors are elected by first-past-the-post voting in six wards, while the remaining five are chosen from party lists so that the total number of party representatives is proportional to the number of votes received.

In the election of 4 November 2026 the Inkatha Freedom Party (IFP) retained its four seats to finish as the largest party on the council.

The following table shows the results of the 2026 election.

| Party | Ward | | | List | | | Total seats |
| Party | Votes | % | Seats | Votes | % | Seats | Total seats |
|---|---|---|---|---|---|---|---|
| Inkatha Freedom Party | 2,909 | 29.59 | 4 | 2,796 | 28.43 | 0 | 4 |
| uMkhonto weSizwe Party | 2,754 | 28.01 | 1 | 2,854 | 29.02 | 2 | 3 |
| African National Congress | 2,411 | 24.52 | 0 | 2,343 | 23.83 | 3 | 3 |
| Democratic Alliance | 969 | 9.86 | 1 | 993 | 10.10 | 0 | 1 |
| 11 other parties | 789 | 8.02 | 0 | 847 | 8.61 | 0 | 0 |
| Total | 9,832 | 100.00 | 6 | 9,833 | 100.00 | 5 | 11 |
| Valid votes | 9,832 | 98.26 | | 9,833 | 98.29 | | |
| Invalid/blank votes | 174 | 1.74 | | 171 | 1.71 | | |
| Total votes | 10,006 | 100.00 | | 10,004 | 100.00 | | |
| Registered voters/turnout | 17,694 | 56.55 | | 17,694 | 56.54 | | |
