= Newcastle, KwaZulu-Natal =

City in KwaZulu-Natal, South Africa

Newcastle
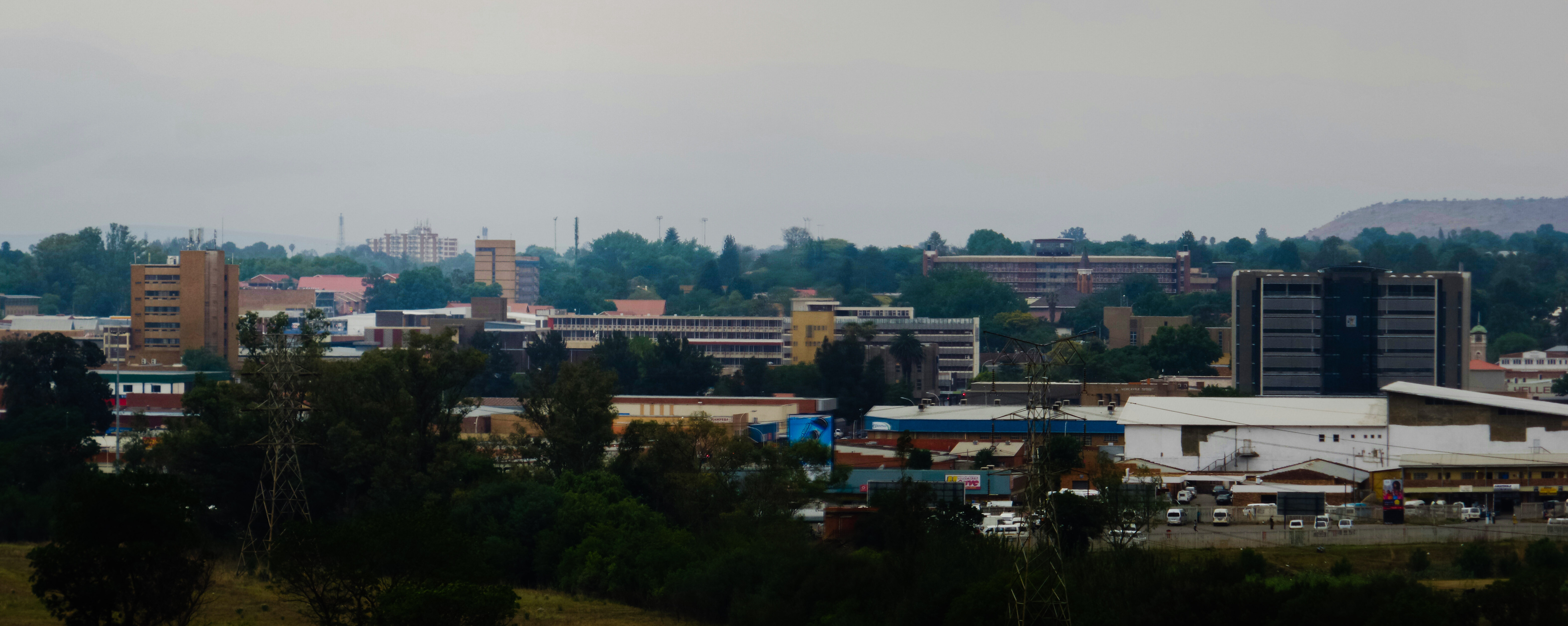
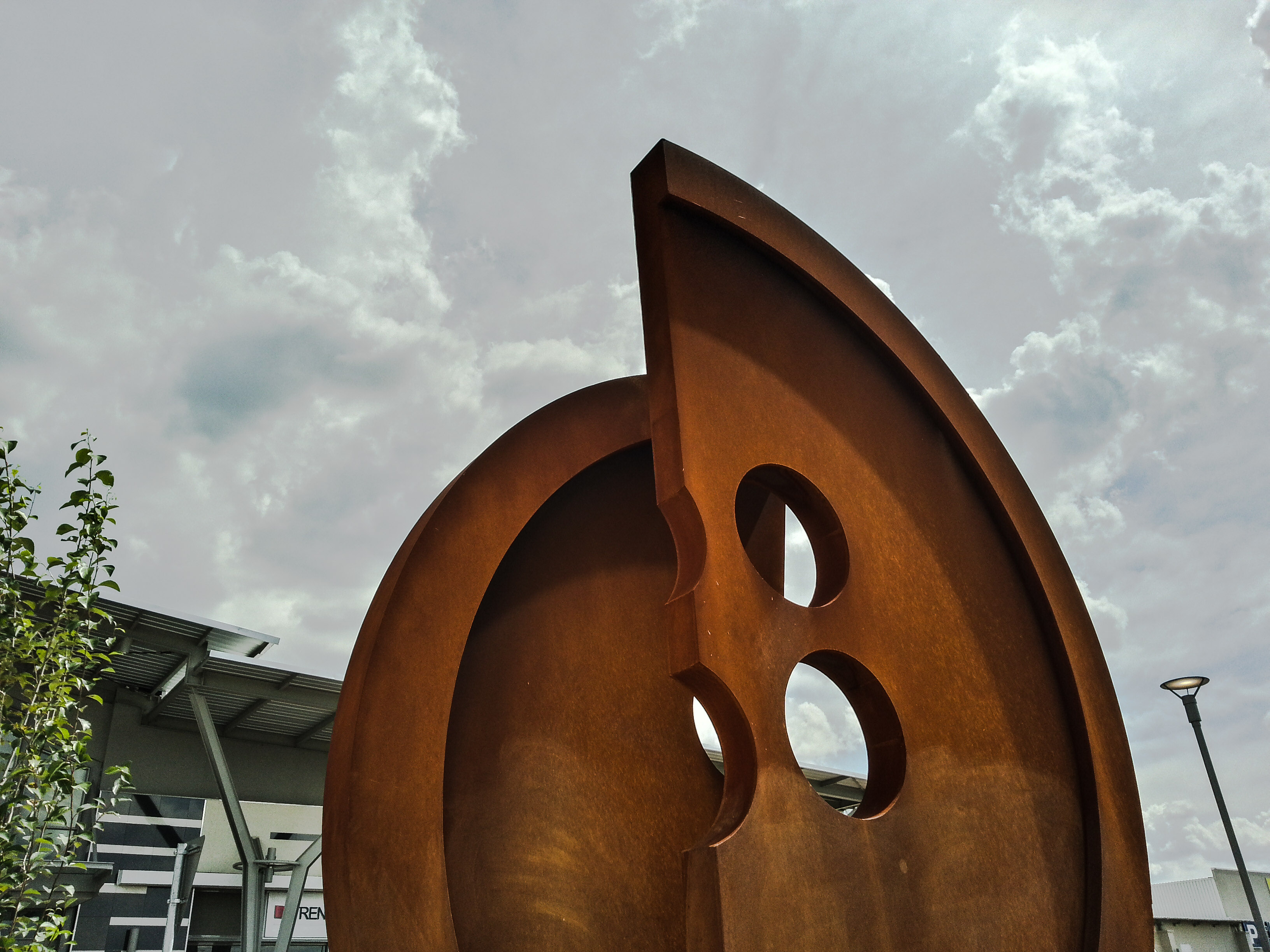
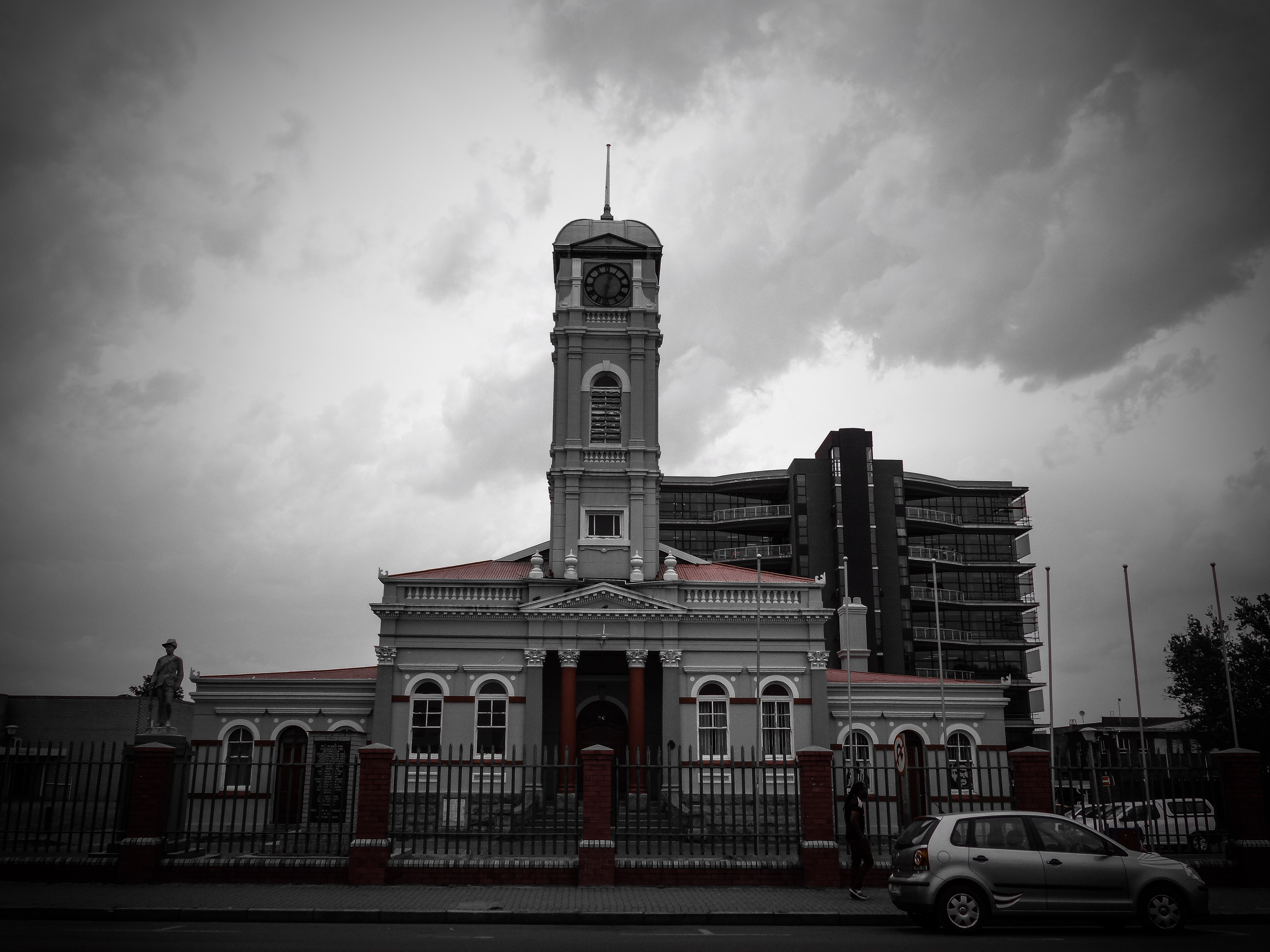
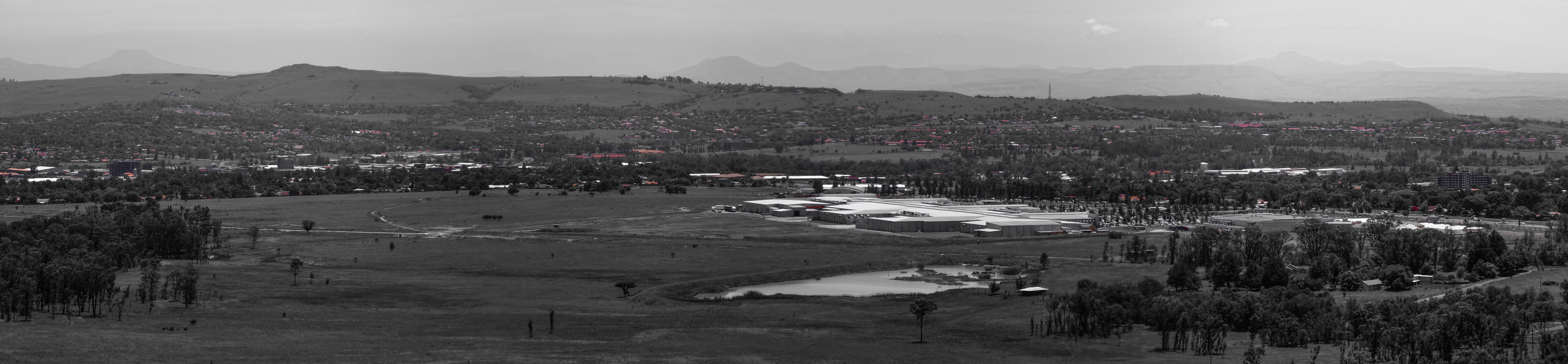
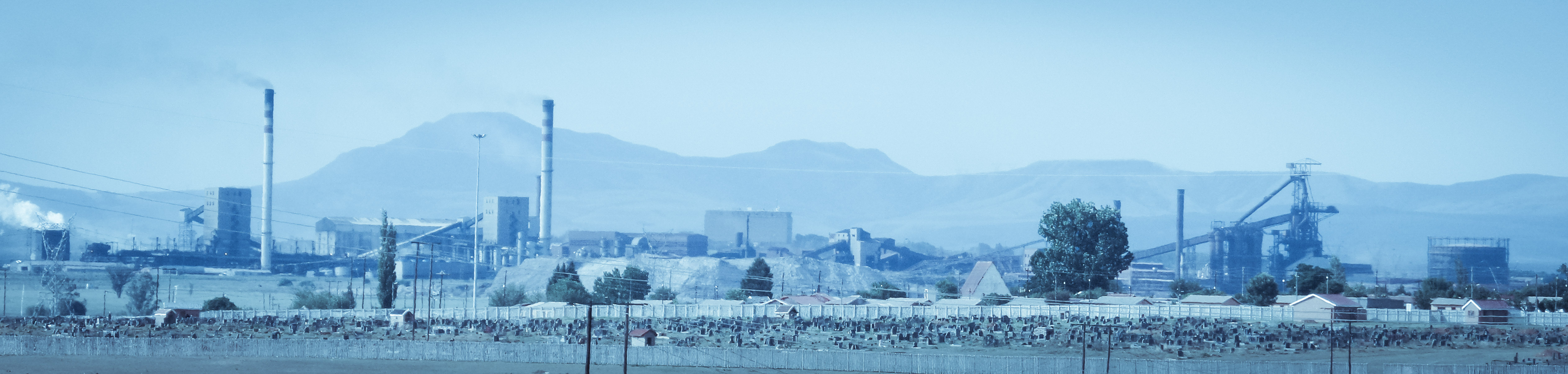
- From the top: Downtown Newcastle Town Skyline from Fort Amiel Museum, Sculpture by Mohau Modisakeng at Entrance 03 of the Newcastle Mall, Newcastle Town Hall, Newcastle from Hilldrop and ArcelorMittal Newcastle Works

- Location within KwaZulu-Natal Location within South Africa Location within Africa
- Coordinates: 27°44′47″S 29°55′58″E
- Country: South Africa
- Province: KwaZulu-Natal
- District: Amajuba
- Municipality: Newcastle
- Established: 1864

Government
  - Mayor: Xolani Dube (Inkatha Freedom Party)

Area
  - Total: 199.06 km^{2} (76.86 sq mi)
- Elevation: 1,194 m (3,917 ft)

Population (2022)
  - Total: 507,710
  - Density: 2,550.5/km^{2} (6,605.9/sq mi)

Racial makeup (2022)
  - Black African: 51.9%
  - Coloured: 3.8%
  - Indian/Asian: 19.8%
  - White: 23.6%
  - Other: 0.9%

First languages (2011)
  - Zulu: 37.4%
  - English: 35.4%
  - Afrikaans: 20.7%
  - Sotho: 1.0%
  - Other: 5.5%
- Time zone: UTC+2 (SAST)
- Postal code (street): 2940
- PO box: 2940
- Area code: 034
- Website: www.newcastle.gov.za

Newcastle is the third-largest city in the province of KwaZulu-Natal, South Africa and is the province's industrial centre. The city has four industrial areas. The majority of its citizens reside in Newcastle East in the main townships of Madadeni and Osizweni, with the balance residing in Newcastle West (the two sides of Newcastle are separated by the N11 road). Set at the foothills of the northern KwaZulu-Natal Drakensberg Mountains, Newcastle is located in the northwest corner of the province along the Ncandu River.

Newcastle is the seat of the local municipality, and the Amajuba District Municipality. Newcastle's municipal area is 1,855 square kilometres (716 square miles), ranking Newcastle as South Africa's 15th-largest city and consists of 34 wards.

The N11 and R34 are the principal roads linking the city to the rest of South Africa.

== History ==
=== Toponymy ===
Newcastle has changed names on numerous occasions during the country's historic rule. It was initially named Post Halt Number 2 on military maps during the 1840s, as postal coaches stopped here to obtain fresh horses on the journey between Durban (then Port Natal in Zuid-Afrikaansche Republiek) and Johannesburg. It was later known as the Waterfall River Township because of the Ncandu River. Newcastle was named after the British Colonial Secretary, the fifth Duke of Newcastle, a British aristocrat, and not the city in England as some believe. On 14 October 1899, during the Anglo-Boer War, Newcastle was invaded by Boer forces, and the entire district was incorporated into the Transvaal Republic. After seven months it was renamed Viljoensdorp, after the commander of the Johannesburg Commando, General Ben Viljoen. However, after relief of Ladysmith under the command of General Redver Buller, the British forces reclaimed the name Newcastle.

=== Establishment ===
Newcastle (then Post Halt Number 2) was strategically situated in 1854 by the Surveyor-General of the Natal Colony, Dr. P.C. Sutherland on the banks of the flooded Ncandu River. In 1864, Newcastle was founded on the site, becoming the fourth settlement to be established in Natal after Durban, Weenen and Pietermaritzburg.

=== War and British rule ===
In 1876, Fort Amiel was constructed to ward off the Zulus during the war, and in 1873 Newcastle became a separate electoral division. To commemorate Queen Victoria's Diamond Jubilee (60th anniversary), the construction of a sandstone town hall commenced in 1897, and was completed two years later. The town was used as a depot by the British during both the First and Second Boer War, and also functioned as a major transport junction and stopover for wagons and post chaises during the late 19th century.

British preparation work for the Pretoria Convention of 1881 was done at Newcastle.

=== The Industrial Era ===
In 1890, the first train arrived in Newcastle, and the town was declared a borough in 1891. The discovery of coal brought a new era of prosperity, and several ambitious building projects were planned. In 1920, the Union Steel Corporation built the province's first steel plant, which later became the ISCOR South Works and subsequently decommissioned the plant after the ISCOR North Works was built, now called Arcelor Mittal Newcastle Works.

== Newcastle today ==
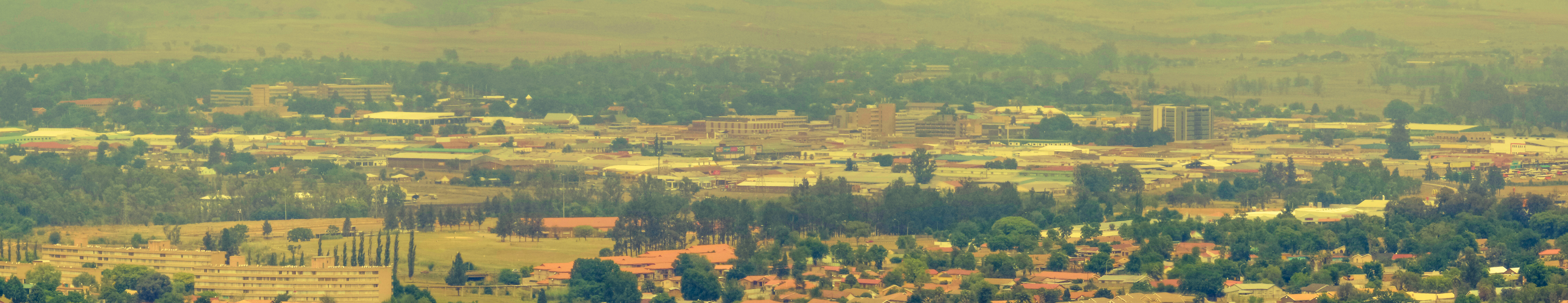
Modern day Newcastle from the suburb of Signal Hill

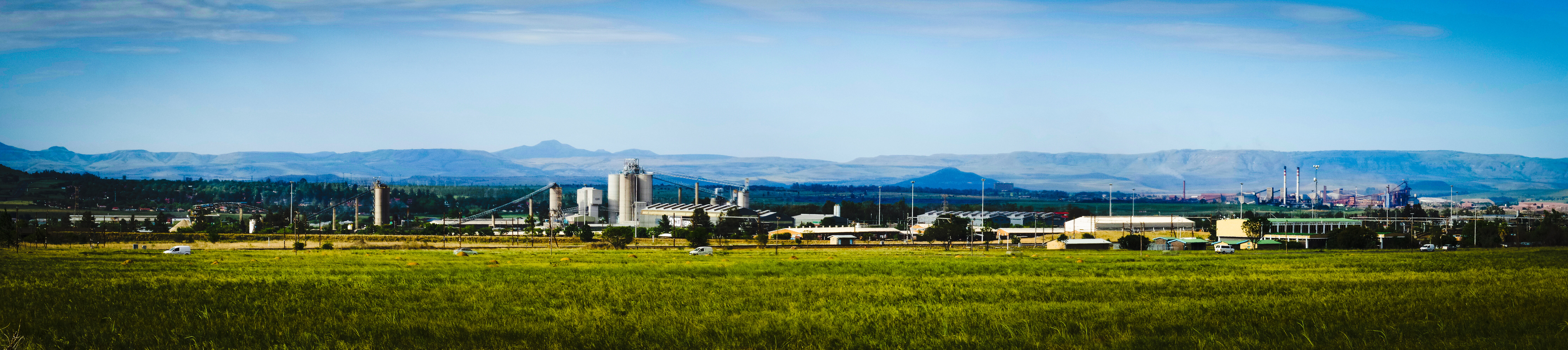
Riverside Industrial

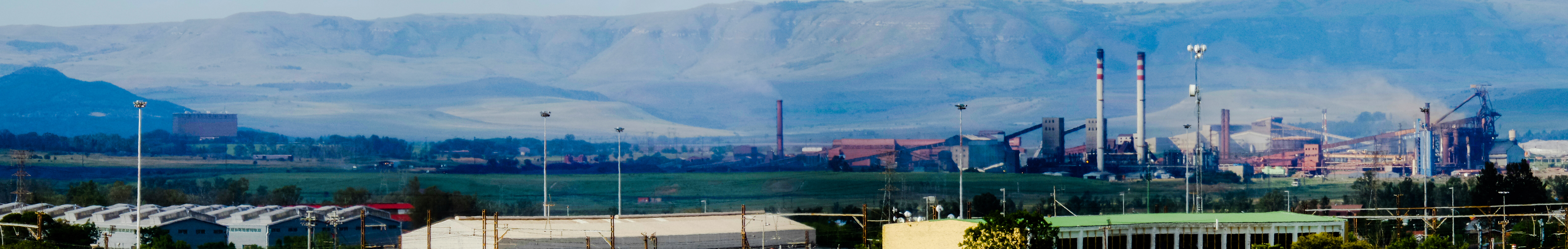
ArcelorMittal Newcastle Works

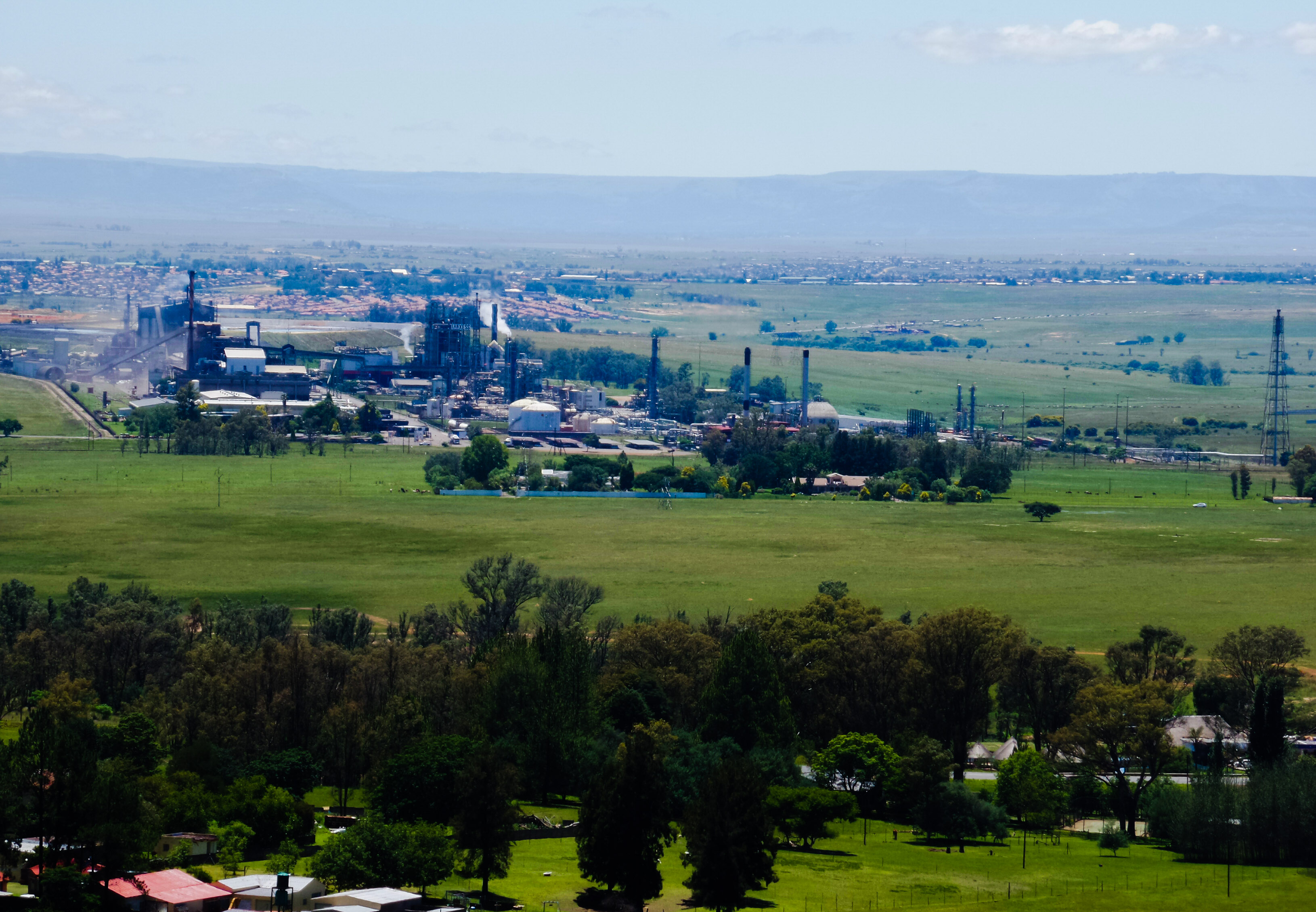
Newcastle Chemical Park

Today, Newcastle is the main commercial and industrial centre in northern KwaZulu-Natal, and is the province's third-largest city. The municipality is making efforts for the city to become sustainable by 2030. Newcastle is the gateway to the Zulu Kingdom from the Free State and Mpumalanga.

== Geography and climate ==
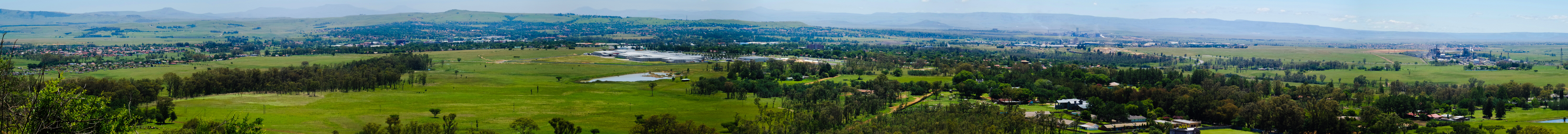
Newcastle surrounded by the Northern Drakensberg Mountains

Located at approximately 1,194 metres (3,917 feet) above sea level, Newcastle is located in the northwest corner of the province of KwaZulu-Natal at the foothills of the northern Drakensberg mountains. The city has a temperate climate and is classified under the country's 'Cold Interior'. Temperatures in Newcastle often drop below freezing during the winter months, with snowfall often experienced at least twice a decade. Newcastle's summer temperatures have exceeded 40 degrees Celsius in the recent past due to the 2015 El Niño weather phenomenon, with the region experiencing drought conditions after 28 years.

Climate data for Newcastle
Month	Jan	Feb	Mar	Apr	May	Jun	Jul	Aug	Sep	Oct	Nov	Dec	Year
Record high °C (°F)	38 (100)	36 (97)	37 (99)	32 (90)	30 (86)	27 (81)	25 (77)	28 (82)	39 (102)	40 (104)	43 (109)	38 (100)	43 (109)
Mean daily maximum °C (°F)	28 (82)	28 (82)	27 (81)	25 (77)	23 (73)	20 (68)	20 (68)	23 (73)	26 (79)	27 (81)	28 (82)	29 (84)	25 (77)
Mean daily minimum °C (°F)	15 (59)	15 (59)	16 (61)	9 (48)	4 (39)	2 (36)	2 (36)	5 (41)	8 (46)	12 (54)	13 (55)	14 (57)	10 (50)
Record low °C (°F)	9 (48)	10 (50)	5 (41)	2 (36)	−1 (30)	−6 (21)	−5 (23)	−3 (27)	−1 (30)	3 (37)	5 (41)	6 (43)	−6 (21)
Average precipitation mm (inches)	137 (5.4)	111 (4.4)	83 (3.3)	41 (1.6)	13 (0.5)	10 (0.4)	10 (0.4)	24 (0.9)	38 (1.5)	91 (3.6)	105 (4.1)	121 (4.8)	784 (30.9)
Average precipitation days	19	12	10	6	2	2	5	10	6	9	16	18	115
Source: South African Weather Service

== Demographics ==
Zulus form the largest single ethnic group. Due to its past, Newcastle has a large number of British, Afrikaner, and Indian people, with several places of worship and spiritual organizations based in the city's suburbs.

Since the mid-1980s, the city has seen an influx of Chinese citizens. The approximately 200 Chinese-owned businesses have contributed to Newcastle's textile and plastic manufacturing industries.

Following the end of Apartheid, the cultural footprint of the Chinese community expanded greatly. As of 2021, there are an estimate 3000 people of Chinese descent living in Newcastle. The Nan Hua Temple, which is the African headquarters of the Fo Guang Shan order, maintains a branch in Newcastle. The Buddha's Light International Association (BLIA) established both a mediation centre and Chinese School in Newcastle which serves both the local Chinese community and the broader public.

== Economy ==
Newcastle has the largest concentration of commerce and industry in northern KwaZulu-Natal. The city serves the surrounding towns of Utrecht, Vryheid, Dannhauser, Glencoe and Dundee, as well as the farmers, South Africa at large, and the export market with a range of products and goods.

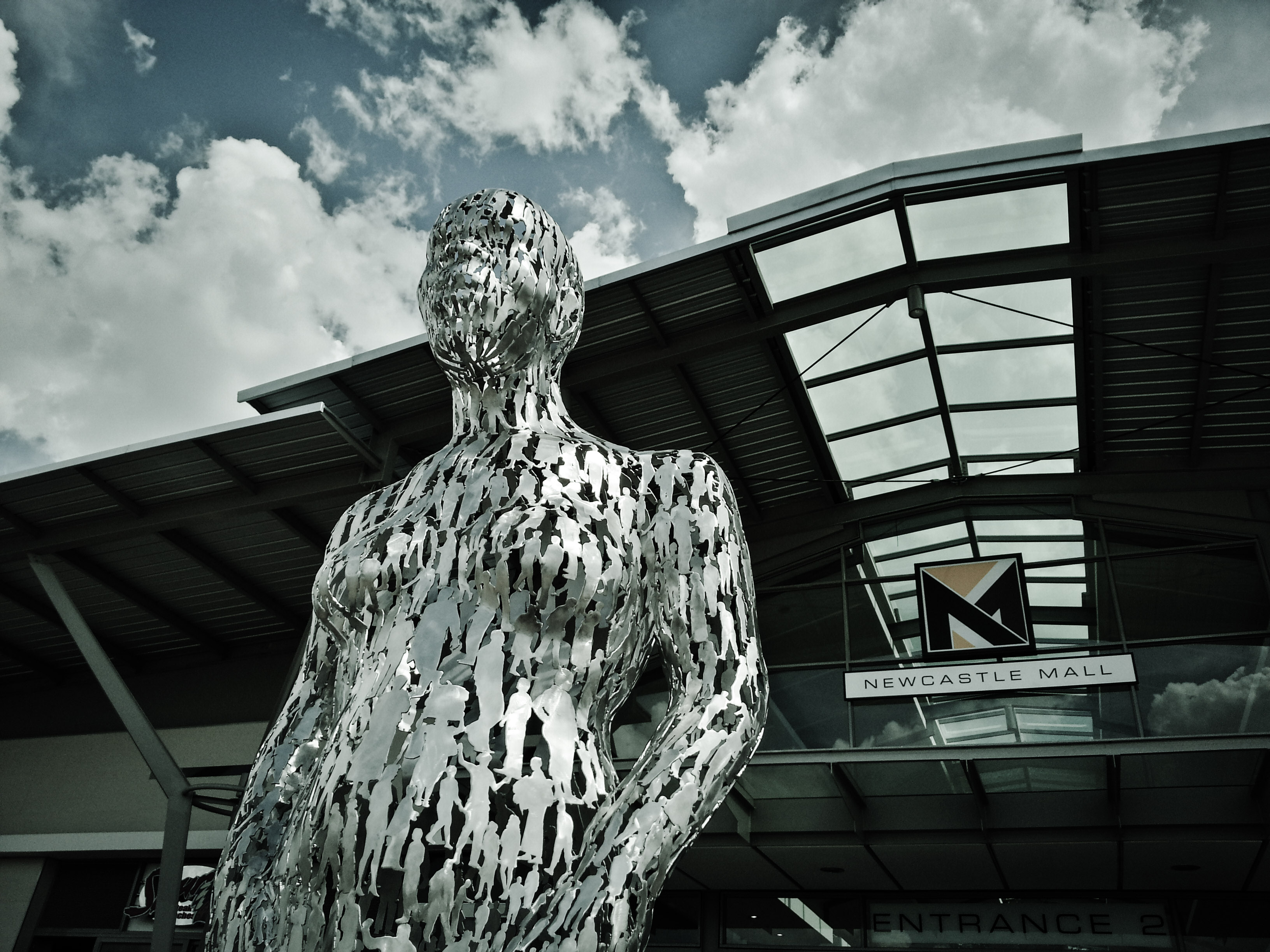
Newcastle Mall

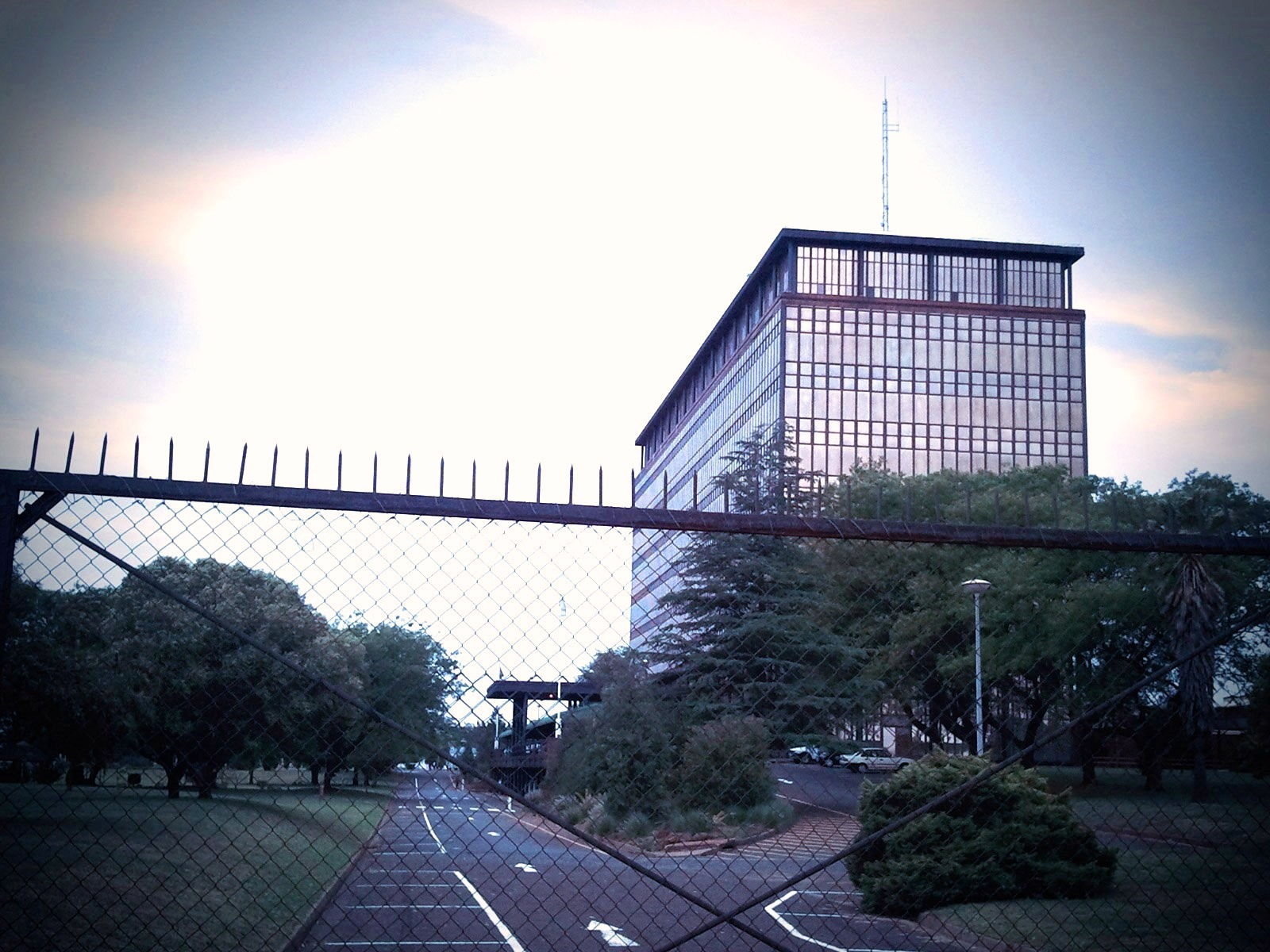
Arcelor Mittal Head Office Building

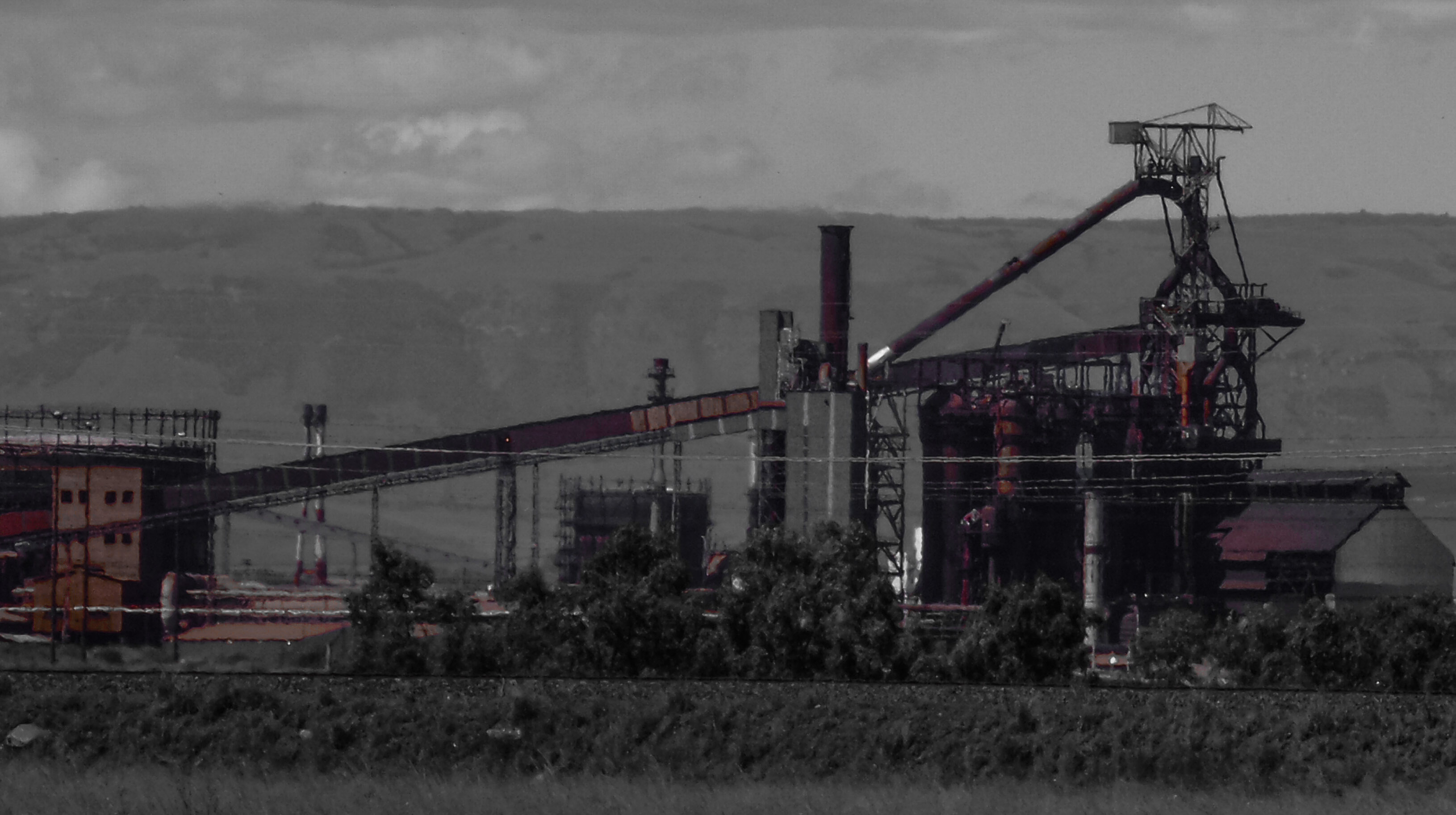
The 110 meter tall N5 Blast Furnace at ArcelorMittal Newcastle

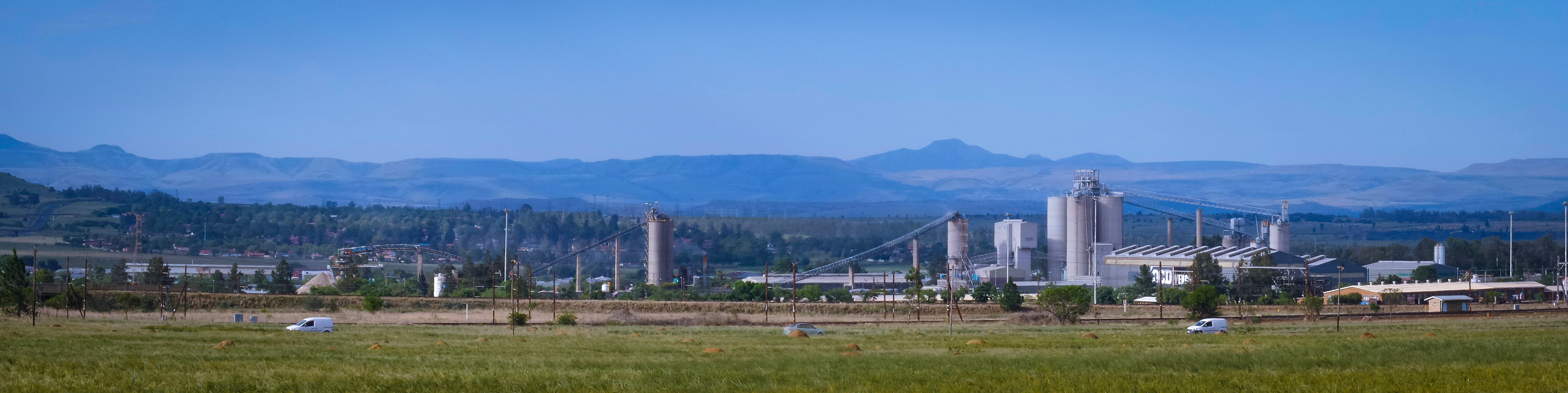
Natal Portland Cement Plant in Riverside Industrial

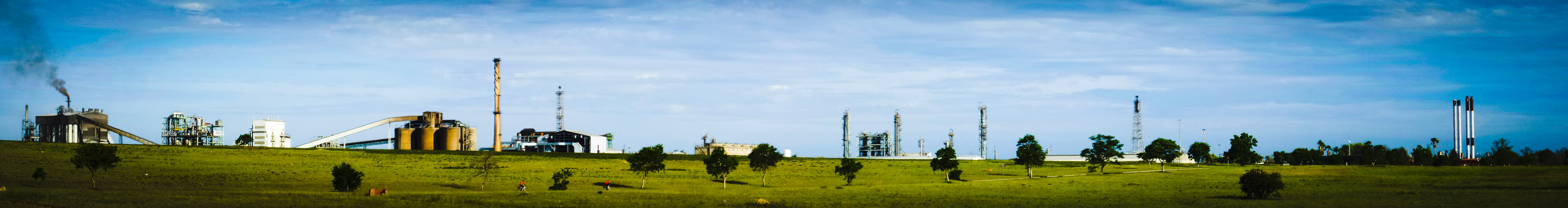
Newcastle Chemical Park rising above the horizon

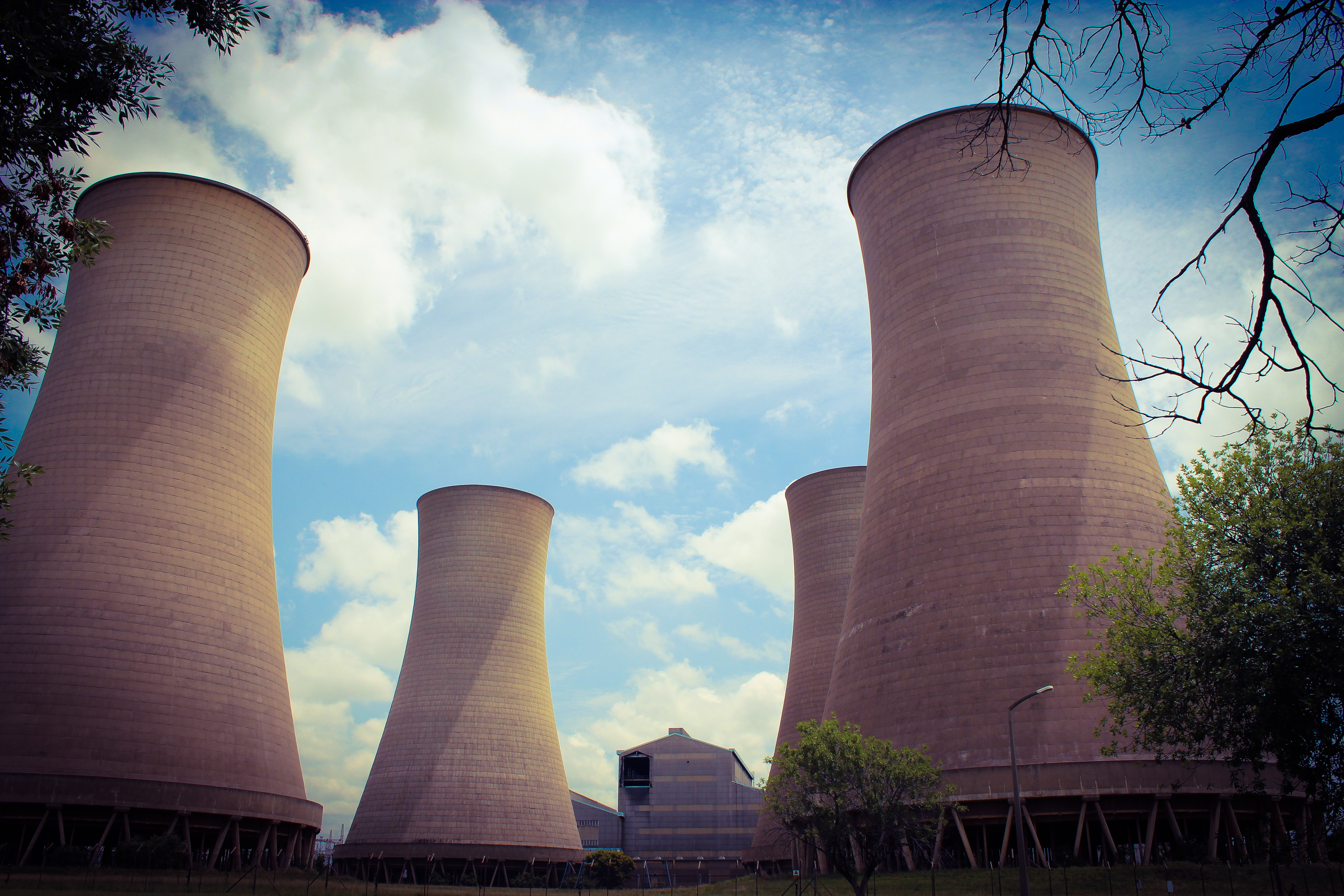
Newcastle Co-generation Plant

=== Industry ===
The city has four industrial areas, namely Riverside Industrial, Airport Industrial, Madadeni Industrial Estate, and Arcelor Mittal Newcastle Works. Newcastle's economy is dominated by heavy industry, clothing and textile, services, and engineering industries, as well as extensive local coal mining.

Arcelor Mittal steelworks, the Natal Portland Cement (NPC) slagment cement plant, the LANXESS Chrome Chemical Plant and the Karbochem synthetic rubber plant, which covers 500,000 square metres (5,381,955 square feet) manufacturing space dominate the Newcastle industrial area. Heavy engineering works firms such as DCD Venco and Boschpick Engineering supply ancillary services to the aforementioned large concerns and the rest of South Africa.

Chinese and Taiwanese businesspeople established more than a hundred textile factories in the Riverside Industrial Estate and the Madadeni Industrial Estate.

In 2011 Independent Power South Africa (IPSA) converted the old Ngagane Power Station into the Newcastle Cogeneration Plant, an 18 MW gas fired powerstation that provides a dedicated power supply to the Karbochem chrome chemical plant which was completed during 2002.

This joint venture project between Karbochem and German speciality chemical manufacturing giant LANXESS has made Newcastle the largest producer of chrome chemicals in Africa. The company announced an investment of €40 million in 2012 towards the construction of an innovative CO_{2} plant (Cansolv chemical process) at its site.

ArcelorMittal Newcastle produces over 1.5 million tons of long steel products annually and in 2015 undertook a major reline on the N5 Blast Furnace valued at R1.8 billion. The closure of the Newcastle steel-making operations was announced in January 2025.

In mid-2014, a portion of Airport Industrial was renamed the Newcastle Chemical Park, and houses African Amines (Pty) Ltd, Karbochem (Pty) Ltd, KC Energy (Pty) Ltd, LANXESS (CISA) (Pty) Ltd, Newcastle Co-generation (IPSA), and South African Calcium Carbide (Pty) Ltd.

Other large operations include firms such as Formosa Plastics and Nova Clothing, both of which manufacture goods for the country's leading retailers, diamond-cutting works, various engineering concerns, and building industry-related services such as brick manufacturing, roofing systems, and steel reinforcement.

=== Buildings and roads ===
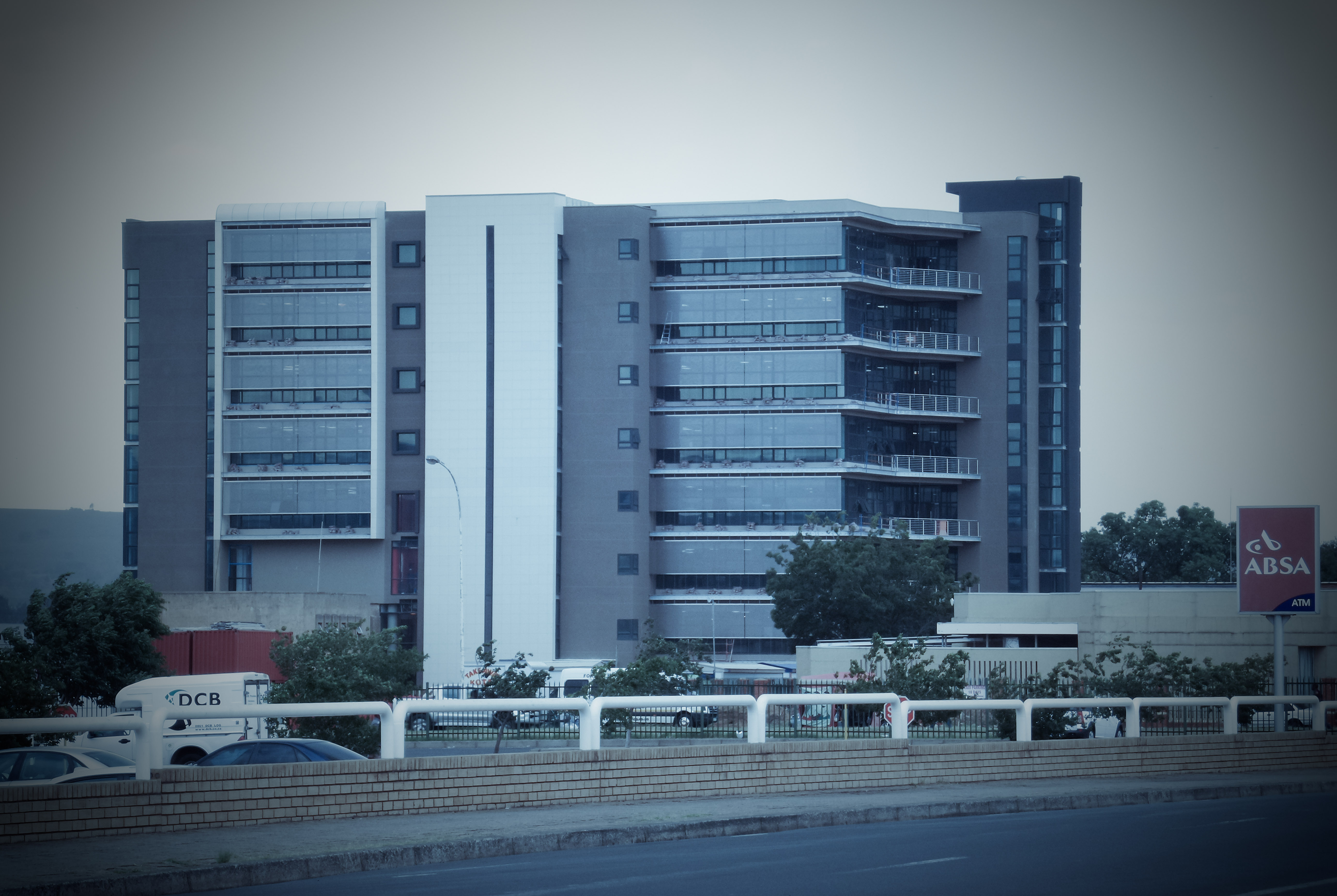
Newcastle Civic Centre

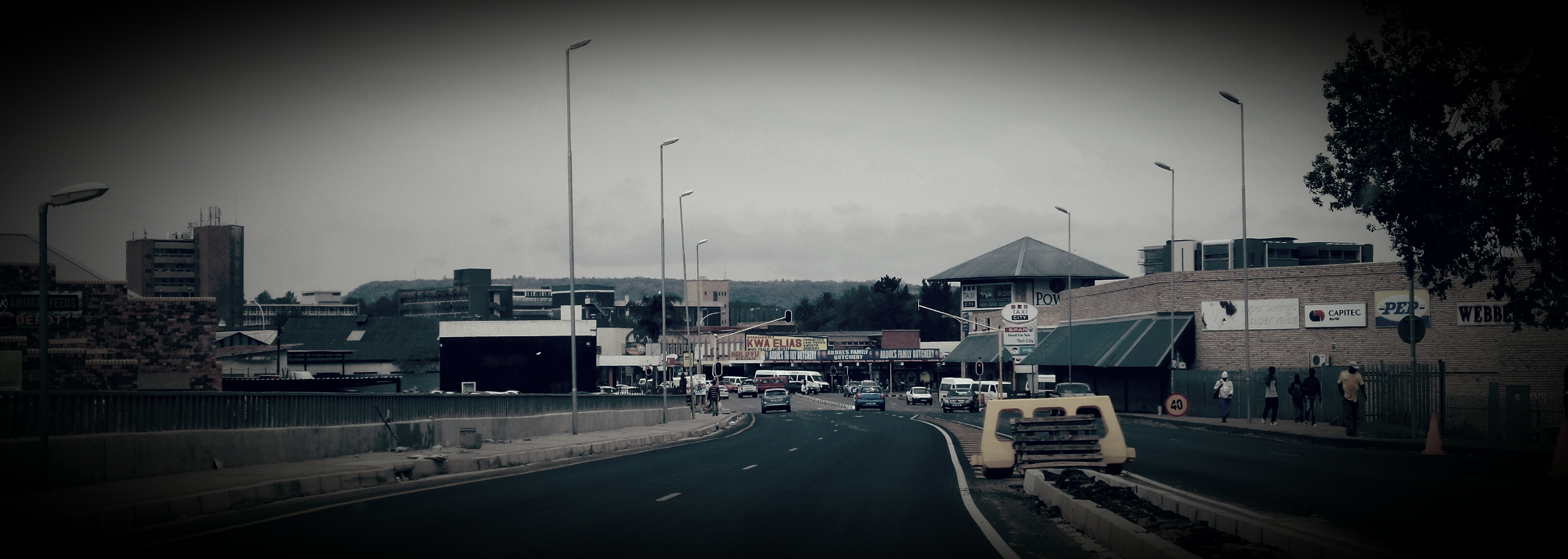
Allen Street Bridge Extension

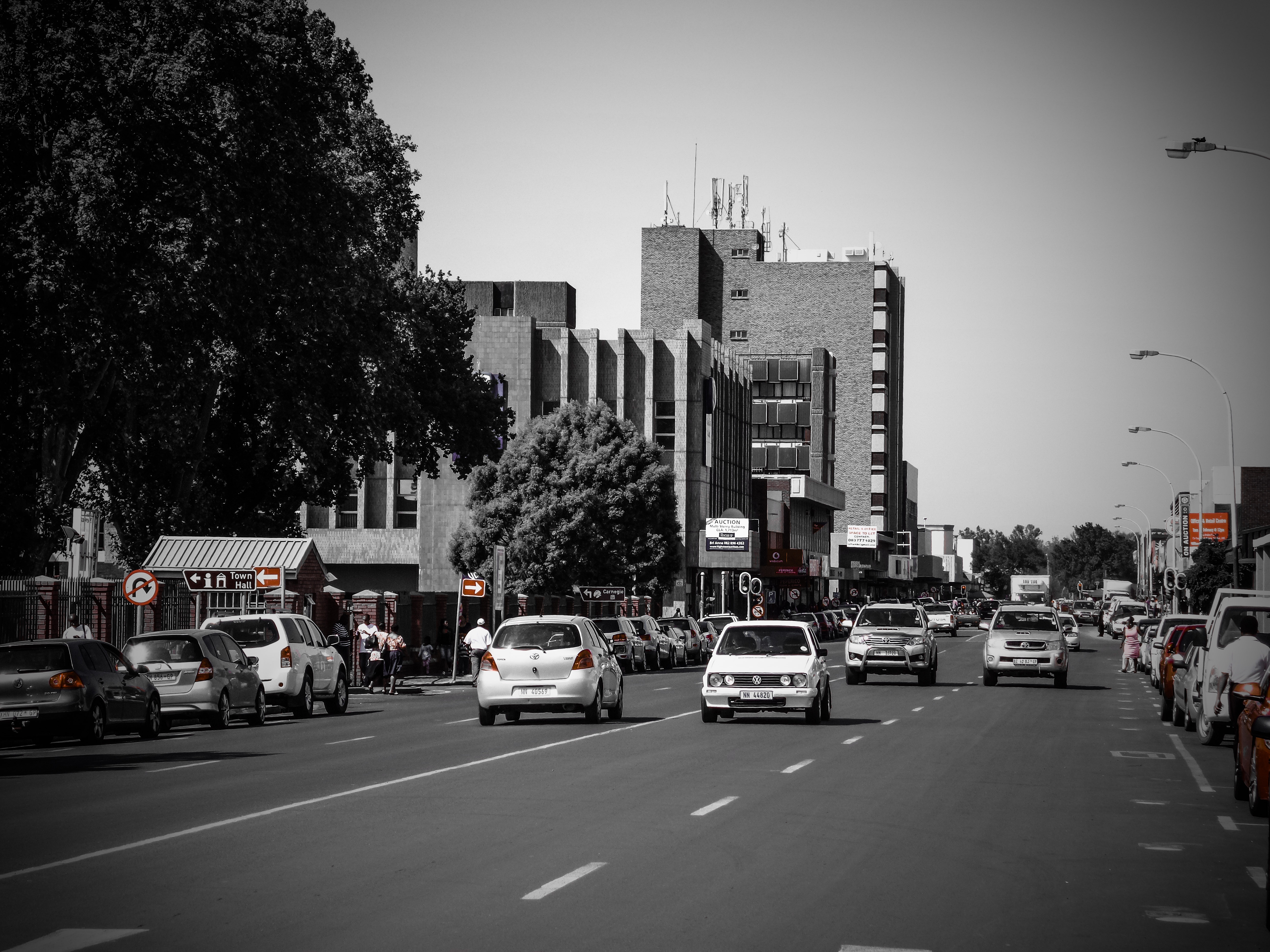
Street Scene on Scott Street

Recent development in Newcastle includes the new multi-storey Civic Centre, Victorian Mall expansion, the Meadowlands Estate in Madadeni, the Vulintaba Country Estate in the Drakensberg outside Newcastle, Newcastle Corner, and the Equarand mixed-use precinct.

Recent roadworks include the D96 rebuild, the Allen Street bridge and widening of Allen Street along Trim Park, the Link Road extension Phase 1, and the Albert Wessels Drive extension Phase 1.

Proposed future projects include the Newcastle Technology Hub, expansion of the Newcastle Airport, and the re-alignment of the N11 bypass south of Newcastle by SANRAL.

== Tallest structures ==
=== Industrial ===
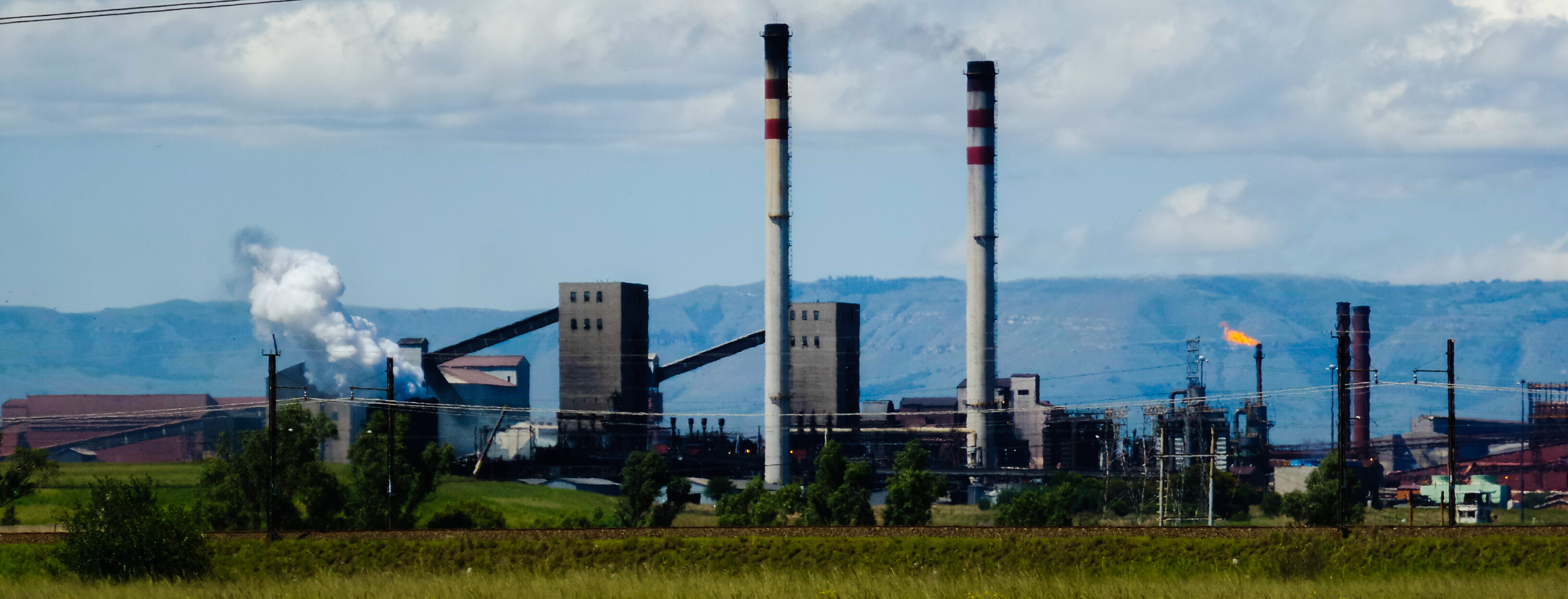
The 140 meter tall stacks and 70 meter tall Coke Ovens at Arcelor Mittal Newcastle

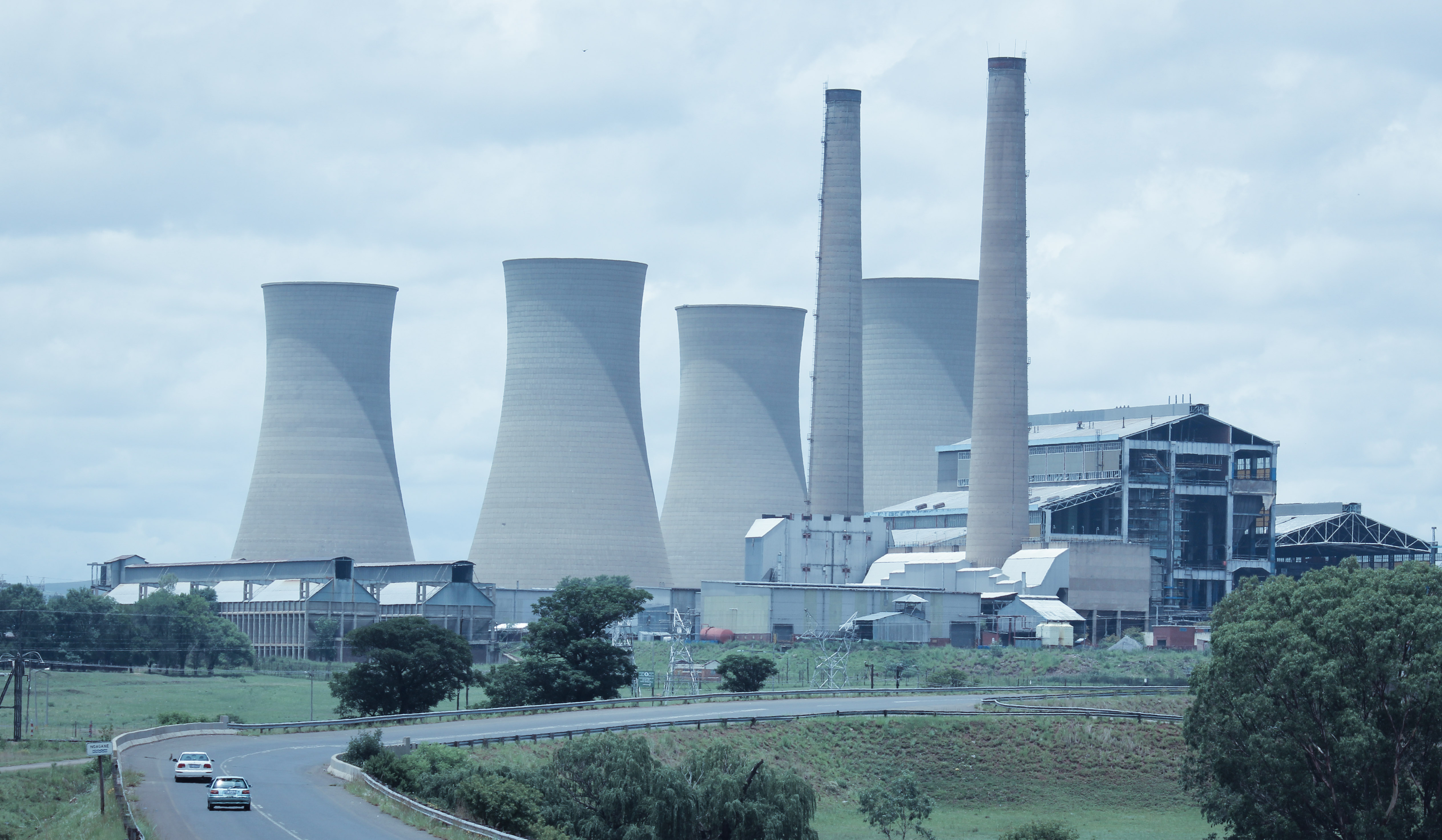
The 120 meter tall stacks and 94 meter tall Cooling Towers of the Newcastle Co-generation Plant

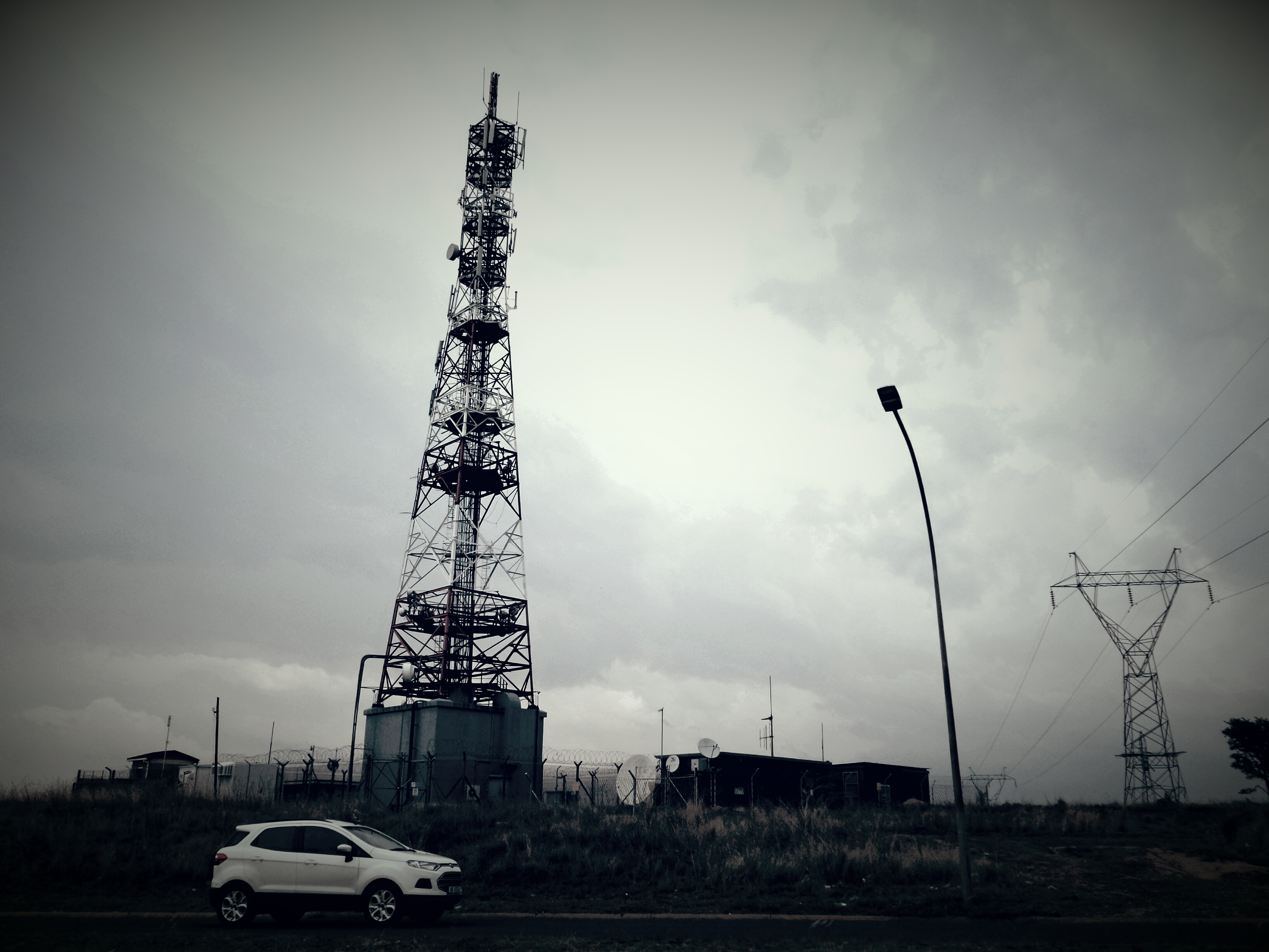
The Signal Hill Tower is 72 m (236 ft) tall

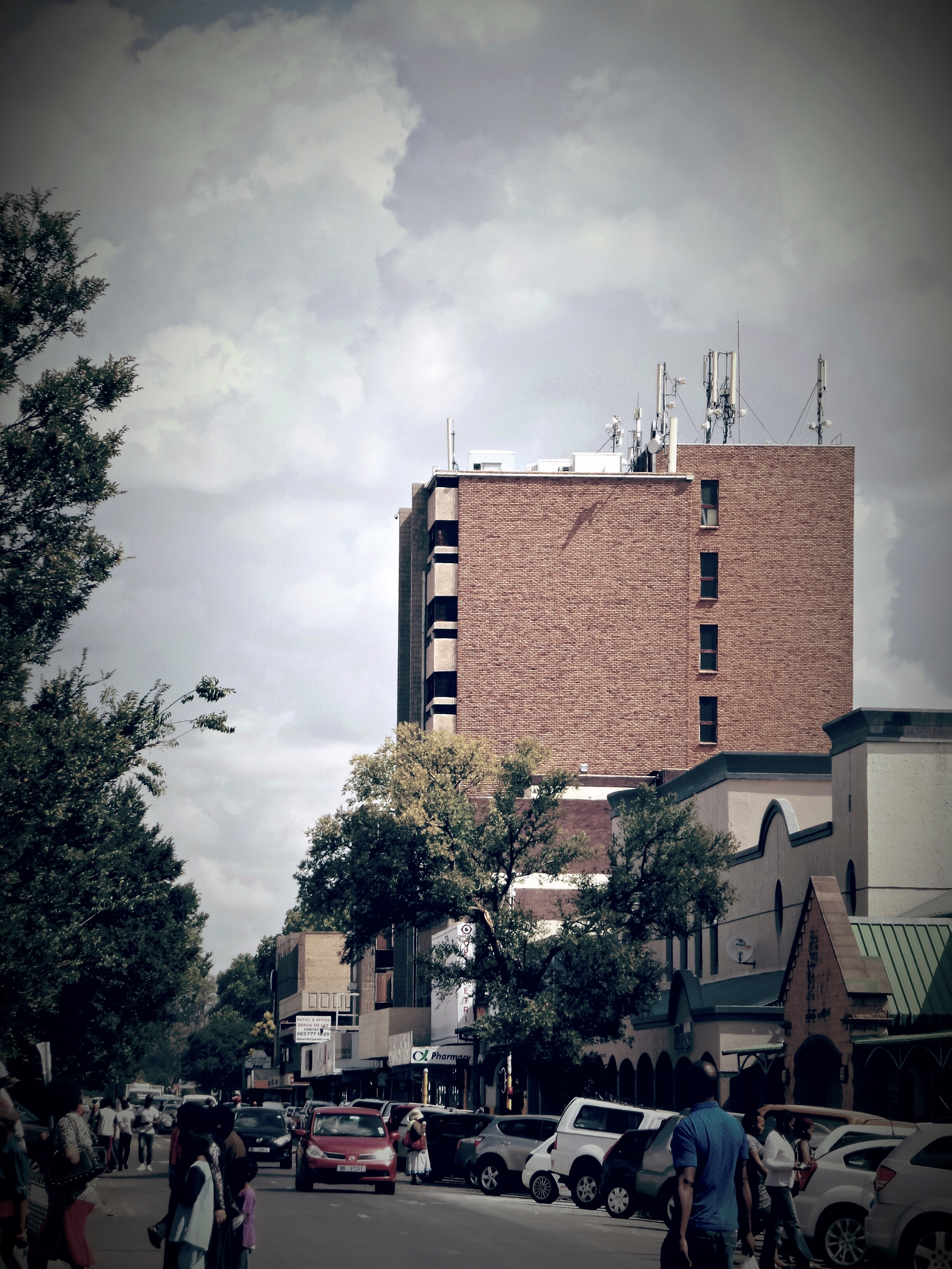
The DBM Building is the tallest building in downtown Newcastle with its structure topping out at 44 m (144 ft) and antenna at 54 m (177 ft)

- Arcelor Mittal

Arcelor Mittal has a number of tall structures exceeding 50 metres (160 feet) in height. The most notable on Newcastle's skyline include: The 2 stacks are 140 metres (460 feet) tall. The N5 blast furnace is 110 metres (360 feet) tall. The coke ovens are 70 metres (230 feet) tall.

- Newcastle Co-generation Plant

The 2 stacks are 120 metres (390 feet) tall. The 4 cooling towers are 94 metres (308 feet) tall.

- Natal Portland Cement

The lift structure for the main 4 silos is 78 metres (256 feet) tall.

- Newcastle Chemical Park

This facility has several tall industrial structures and stacks above 50 metres (160 feet) in height.

=== Telecommunications ===
The Signal Hill Tower is 72 metres (236 feet) tall.

=== Buildings ===
- Arcelor Mittal Head Office Building: 10 storeys - structural height is 50 metres (160 feet) & top of antenna is 70 metres (230 feet).
- DBM Building: 9 storeys - structural height is 44 metres (144 feet) and the top of antenna is 54 metres (177 feet).
- Newcastle Civic Centre: 9 storeys with a structural height of 40 metres (130 feet).

== Tourism ==
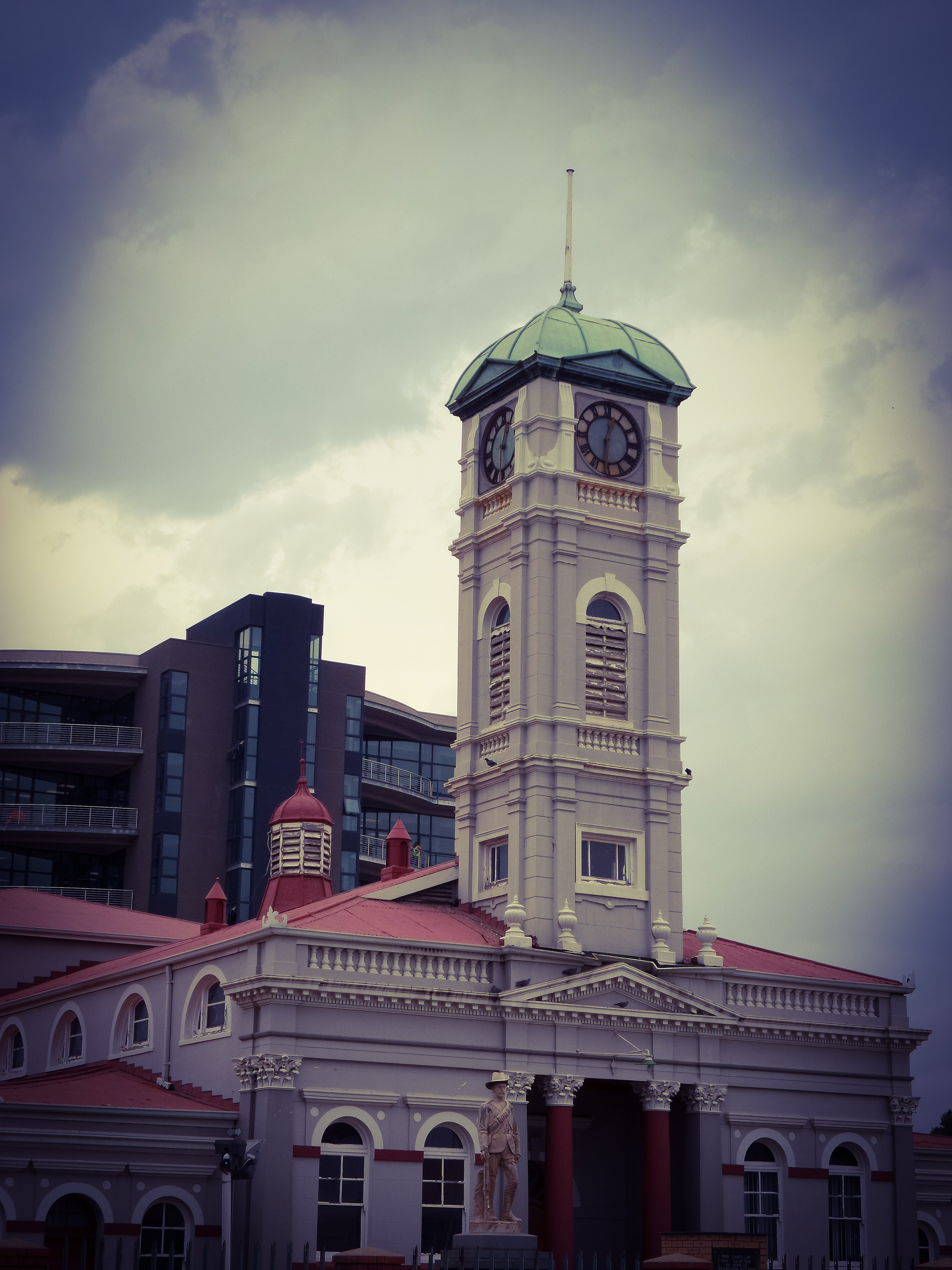
The clock tower of Newcastle City Hall

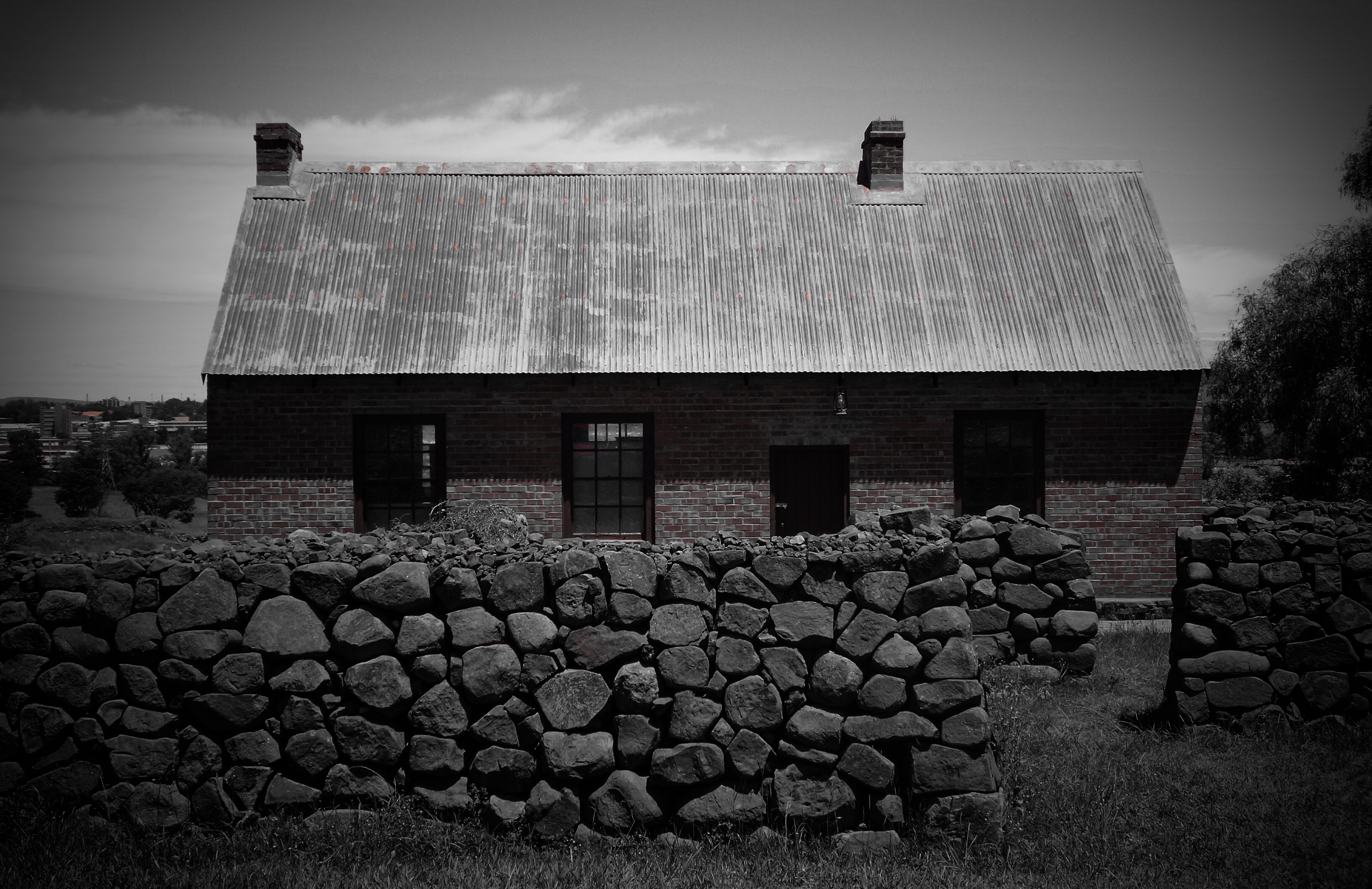
Fort Amiel Museum - 4

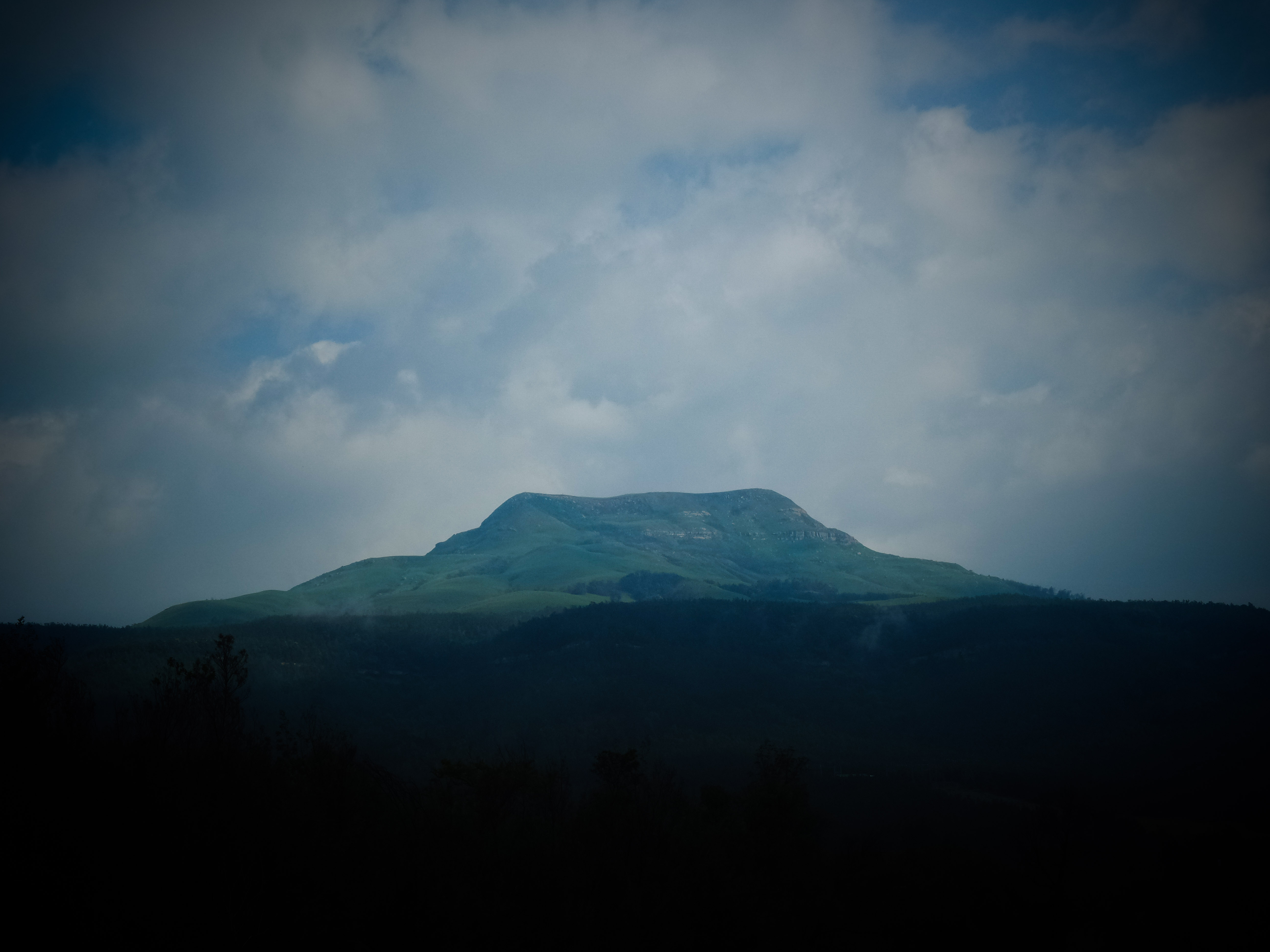
Majuba Mountain from the N11

As Newcastle is on the alternative route to travellers from Gauteng to Durban, attempts have been made to capture potential tourist revenue by enticing travellers to visit the scenic and historic Battlefields Route where war once raged (Battlefields Route Website). Apart from a few hotels, there are many guesthouses and bed & breakfasts providing luxurious accommodation. Historic places of interest in Newcastle on this route include:

- Newcastle City Hall
- The Carnegie Art Gallery
- Haggards Hilldrop House
- The Armoury
- Newcastle Cemetery
- Hindu Shiva Temple
- Chief Albert Luthuli and the Blaauwbosch Methodist School and Church
- King Dinuzulu & the Old Prison
- Maharaj House
- Fort Amiel Museum
- O'Neills Cottage
- Majuba Mountain

== Transport ==
=== Road ===
The N11 is the principal road running through the city, connecting south to Ladysmith and north to Ermelo in the Mpumalanga Province.

The R34 connects north-west to Vrede in the Free State and east to Vryheid and Empangeni.

=== Rail ===
Newcastle lies on the main passenger and goods railway line between Johannesburg and Durban. The city has a large rail siding and cargo facility.

=== Airport ===
Newcastle has one airport which is located approximately 7 kilometres (4.3 miles) south-east of the city centre, south of the city's railway station. Chartered flights provide daily service.

== Society and culture ==
=== Galleries ===
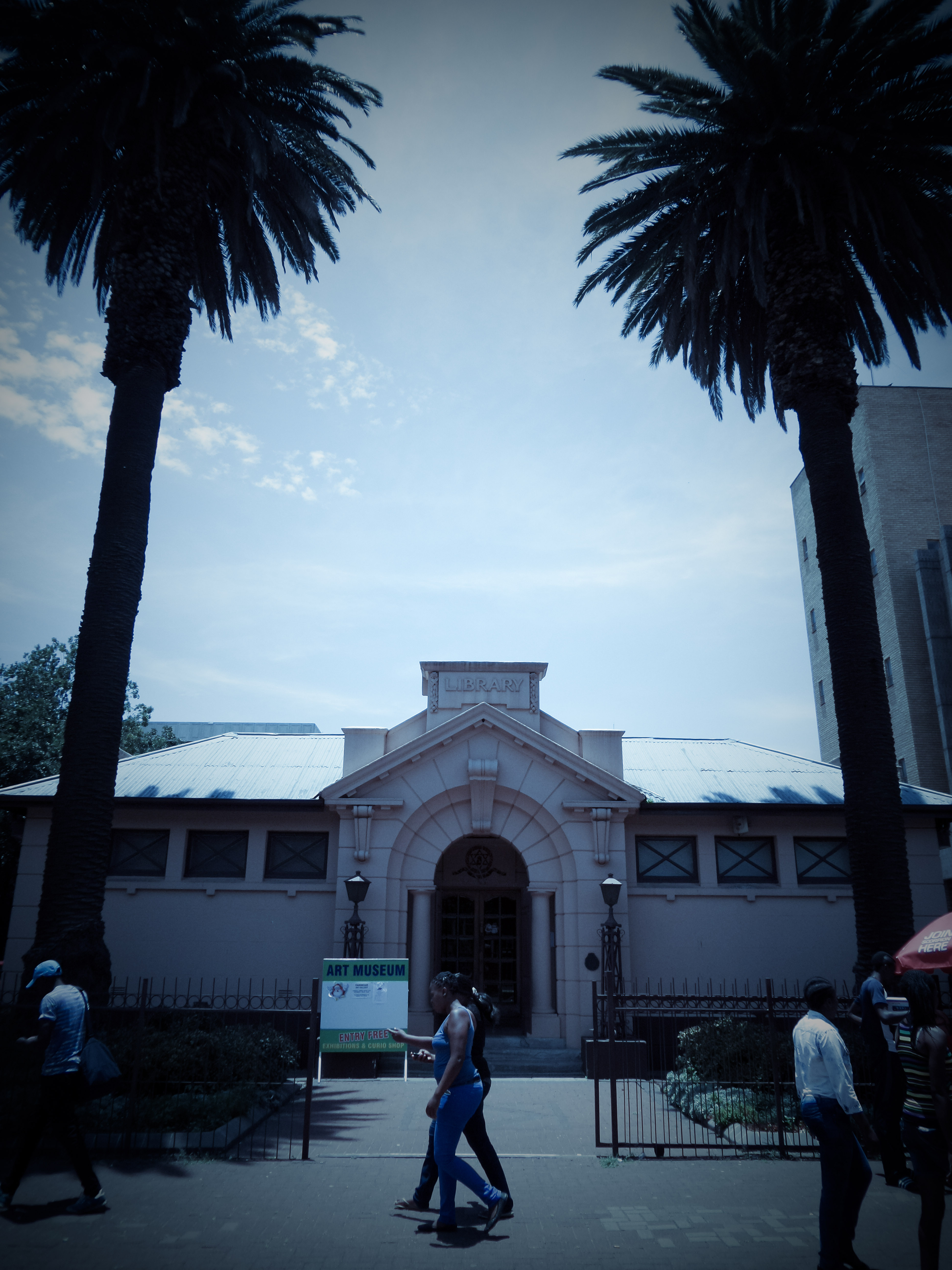
The Carnegie Art Gallery in the city gardens

- The Carnegie Art Gallery represents South African artists as well as local artists; this historic building falls within the city's civic precinct.

=== Museums, monuments and memorials ===
- Fort Amiel Museum, a typical Victorian frontier fort, is a National Heritage Site.

=== Music ===
Newcastle is home to the Northern KwaZulu-Natal Youth Choir – a provincial choir of international repute.

The annual Vodacom Winter Festival aka 'Newcastle Show' provides a platform for South African bands and singers, and attracts visitors from the entire region. Notable performers who performed for the event include Matthew Mole, Cassper Nyovest, Majozi, Snotkop, and Jo Black.

=== Places of worship ===
Newcastle has all of the major religious organizations represented; churches, temples, and mosques can be found throughout the city. Landmarks include the NG Kerk on York Street, and the Hindu Shiva Temple on Kirkland Street. The Darul Uloom on St Thomas Street, an institute of higher Islamic studies, is a landmark in Newcastle's diverse community with a modern mosque on the premises.

== Sport ==
Newcastle remains a venue for major sports competitions and conferences because of the facilities the city has to offer. A variety of rugby, cricket, soccer, squash, tennis, swimming, and other sport facilities has contributed to its ability to host both national and international events.

=== Stadia ===
Newcastle has numerous multi-purpose stadia around the city, which are mostly used to host local sport competitions, school sports and inter-school sports; these accommodate soccer, cricket, rugby, squash, tennis, and volleyball. The most notable stadia are the Newcastle Swimming Pool, Arbor Park Grounds, Paradise A & B, and the Madadeni Sports Stadium.

=== Swimming ===
Newcastle has five public swimming pools; the Olympic-sized Newcastle swimming pool in Sunnyridge (previously the Ferrum swimming pool) recently hosted the All-Africa Development Gala.

=== Sports complex ===
Located in Arbor Park, this modern complex has indoor and outdoor facilities, with a bowling green.

=== Wrestling ===
Newcastle Wrestling Academy is one of the top wrestling clubs in KwaZulu-Natal.

=== Fishing ===
Newcastle is home to the Challengers Angling Club and an annual angling competition is held to assist local charities.

=== Rugby ===
The local rugby club is the Newcastle Highlanders Rugby.

=== Soccer ===
Newcastle is home to Stella Football Club and has produced players to represent the province and country. Newcastle is also the home to Newcastle All Stars who play in KZN ABC Motsepe league.

=== Cricket ===
Newcastle has a local cricket league, and matches are hosted at various stadiums around the city.

=== Golf ===
Newcastle has three golf courses: one 18 hole golf course, Newcastle Golf Club, and two 9 hole golf courses, Kilbarchan Golf Club and Vulintaba Country Estate.

=== Horse riding ===
Newcastle has a horse riding club and training course.

== Parks and recreation ==
=== Ntshingwayo Dam ===
Established in 1975, Ntshingwayo Dam (previously Chelmsford Dam) is the third-largest in the province. Located approximately 25 km (16 mi) South West of Newcastle on the Ngagane River, Ntshingwayo Dam is Newcastle's main source of water supply. The surrounding reserve covers an area of 6,500 ha. and is managed by Ezemvelo KZN Wildlife.

The 1,500 ha Game Park has a range of highveld game and bird viewing is common. The park also features the largest population of the rare oribi in South Africa.

Sailing, powerboating, water-skiing and swimming are popular activities on the 3,400 ha. dam and is known as a fishing destination for both hobby and competition anglers, with carp, barbel, and scaly the most commonly caught.

=== Amcor Dam ===
This small dam lies on the Ncandu River in the suburb of Ncandu Park. Amcor dam has various recreation facilities, including playgrounds, swimming pools, and braai (barbeque) areas, and is popular on public holidays and weekends. It is also home to the Newcastle Caravan Park.

=== Newcastle Golf Course ===
The Newcastle Golf Course is located in the suburb of Barry Hertzog Park and offers a mashie course, a driving range, an 18 hole course, a clubhouse, and a restaurant.

=== Ncandu State Forest ===
The Ncandu State Forest Reserve is located 32 km (20 mi) west of Newcastle and is the second biggest indigenous forest in the province; it consists of grassy plains, Yellowwood gorges and streams that run through the forest to meet the Ncandu river, where trout may be found. The reserve offers various trails to view sandstone cliffs, waterfalls, and various bird species. Access to the viewpoints is either by boat or boardwalks.

=== Parks ===
The city has many public parks within its suburbs; such as the Trim Park and The Gardens on Hospital Street. Trim Park is located north of the CBD along the Ncandu River. It is often frequented on weekends and holidays, and is used for hosting picnics and barbecues.

The Gardens on Hospital Street offers an expansive grassy garden with large shady trees, and is located in the suburb of Newcastle Central. The park is used by Newcastillians to walk their pets and play in a free environment. The Gardens are popular on wedding occasions as they offer backdrops for photographs to be taken.

=== Urban play parks ===
This type of park was created to provide playing facilities for the youth in a secure, green play zone. Kids may play unsupervised by parents, as they are under the watchful eye of park security.

== Education ==
=== Primary and secondary education ===
The city is home to numerous major primary and high schools, both government and private.

Private schools include Newcastle High School, St. Dominic's Academy Newcastle and Meridian Newcastle in Madadeni, a township of Newcastle.

Several Newcastle schools have buildings that have been declared National Monuments. These include the Pavilion at St. Dominic's Academy, designed by Brother Nivard Streicher and built in 1912. It was declared a monument in 1977 by Piet Koornhof.

Established in 1882, Newcastle High School is the oldest school in the area. The original school buildings are still in use today as the school's administration block.

Both the Newcastle Brass Band and the Northern KwaZulu-Natal Youth Choir are based in Ferrum High School.

Schools in Newcastle's main townships of Madadeni and Osizweni include Osizweni High School, Indonsa Technical High School, St. Lewis Bertrand's High School, Bethamoya High School, Phendukani High School, Siyamukela High School, Thubelihle High School, Sesiyabonga High School and Ikhwezi High School. Sabela Senior Secondary School is the only high school situated in Madadeni Section 5.

Other schools in Newcastle include Newcastle Islamic College, Amajuba High School, Tugela High School, St Oswald's Secondary (the oldest school of Indian origin), and Lincoln Heights Secondary School. Some junior schools include Hutten Park Primary, Drakensberg Primary, Newcastle Senior Primary, Busy-Bee and Arbor Park Primary, Lennoxton Primary, S.E. Vawda Primary, Suryaville Primary and Chelmsford Primary.

=== Tertiary education ===
Majuba FET College has five separate campuses around Newcastle, as well as a campus in the surrounding town of Dundee.

Qualitas Career Academy, a national private college, has a campus in the CBD. It caters for full-time and part-time studies for students, as well as corporate training and consulting services for businesses and government departments.

UNISA, Damelin, and Boston City Campus & Business College have satellite campuses in Newcastle.

== Medical ==
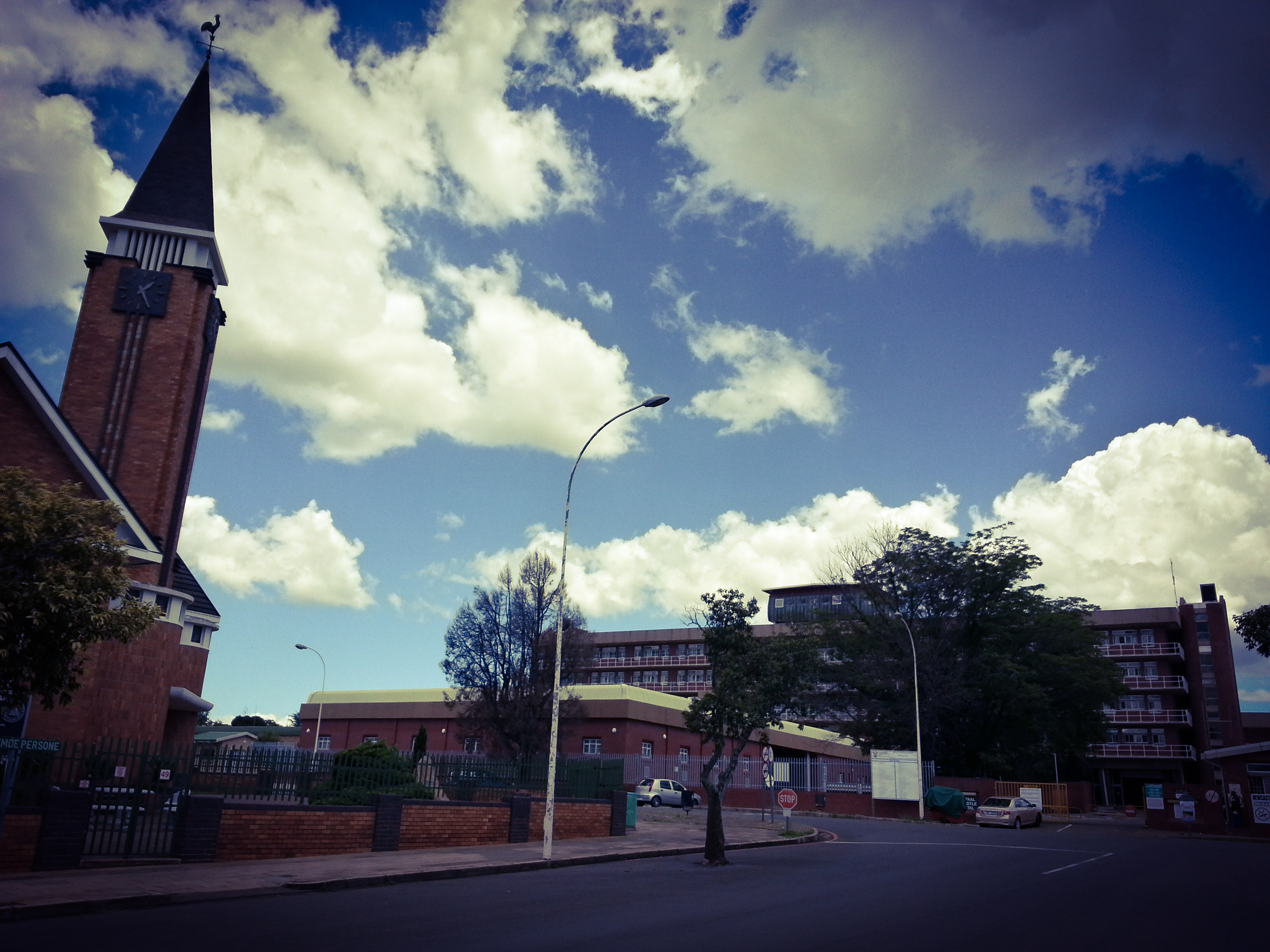
Newcastle Provincial Hospital

Newcastle has three hospitals, two government owned and one privately owned: Newcastle Provincial Hospital (186 beds), Madadeni Hospital (1620 authorized beds, 1154 usable beds) and Mediclinic Newcastle (254 authorized beds, 186 operational beds). There are also several clinics and various specialist physicians. In addition, the La Gratitude Home for the Aged provides retirement and care facilities for the elderly.

There are also 16 government clinics in Osizweni and Madadeni, caring for the health of the broader community. Newcastle native, Sandile Khubeka, is one of South Africa's youngest doctors completing his medical degree at the University of KwaZulu-Natal at the age of 20.

== Media ==
=== Print ===
Caxton Community Newspapers is a major printer and publisher of newsprint materials in the region. Major newspapers include the Newcastle Advertiser, Newcastle Sun, Amajuba Eyethu, Agrieco, and the Northern Natal Get It Magazine. Other local publications include Tabloid Media's Newcastle Express.

=== Online media ===
Pixelfish Marketing Solutions (Pty) Ltd owns and produces the Newcastillian - Online News, an independent news product. The digital news medium services the Newcastle, Northern KwaZulu-Natal, and KwaZulu-Natal communities.

=== Broadcasting ===
Newcastle Community Radio is an independent local radio station broadcasting to Newcastle from their studio in Madadeni on 103.7fm Newcastle Community Radio Website.

Radio 034 is an online radio station located in Newcastle.

Lit Radio ZA is an online radio based in Madadeni Section 2, targeting local youth and other issues that affect the community.

034 Issues Podcast is an independent digital podcast based in Newcastle, KwaZulu-Natal. Founded in 2021, the platform focuses on local interviews, community discussions, entertainment, and conversations with musicians, entrepreneurs, athletes, and public figures from Newcastle and surrounding areas. The podcast is distributed through online platforms including YouTube and Spotify.

== Suburbs ==
=== Mixed-race residential ===
- Amajuba Park
- Amiel Park
- Arbor Park
- Aviary Hill
- Barry Hertzog Park
- Hutten Heights
- Ingagane
- Ncandu Park
- Newcastle Central
- Pioneer Park
- Schuinshoogte
- Signal Hill
- Sunnyridge

=== Former 'Indian' residential ===
- Fernwood
- Ghandi Park
- Lennoxton
- Paradise
- Richview
- Sunset View
- Suryaville

=== Former 'Coloured' residential ===
- Fairleigh
- Lenville

=== Townships ===
- Blaauwbosch
- Cavan
- Claremont
- Dicks Halt
- Eastbourne
- Fulathela
- Inverness
- Jakkalspan
- Kwamathukuza
- Lekkerwater
- Leslie
- Madadeni - Sections A to P
- Mndozo
- Osizweni - Sections A to F
- Emaskral

=== Mixed-use areas ===
- Equarand
- Newcastle CBD
- Vlam
- Vulintaba

=== Industrial zones ===
- Airport Industrial
- Arcelor Mittal North Works
- Madadeni Industrial Estate
- Riverside Industrial

== International relations ==
Newcastle has been internationally connected since the Industrial Era, and is today home to many international industries, the most well-known being steel giant Arcelor Mittal, chrome chemical companies Bayer & Lanxess, synthetic rubber manufacturer Karbochem, and heavy engineering firm DCD Venco.

Furthermore, since the late 1980s, Newcastle has built a strong relationship with mainland China and also Taiwan, following the influx of Chinese nationals in the mid-1980s. To date, China has invested in approximately 100 factories in Newcastle, employing thousands of workers.

=== Twin towns / sister cities ===
Newcastle is part of a global community of Newcastles of the World Website, being the third-largest Newcastle in the world by population. Newcastle was part of the 1998 summit of worldwide cities named "New Castle" with:

Neuburg an der Donau, Germany Neuchâtel, Switzerland Neufchâteau, Vosges, France (United States) New Castle, Delaware, USA (United States) New Castle, Indiana, USA	(United States) New Castle, Pennsylvania, USA Newcastle-under-Lyme, England Newcastle upon Tyne, England Newcastle, KwaZulu-Natal, South Africa Shinshiro, Japan

Newcastle is twinned with:

- Nanchang, China (since 2010)
