= Amajuba District Municipality =

Amajuba North Umzimyathi
- District municipality
- Seal

- Location of Amajuba District Municipality within KwaZulu-Natal
- Coordinates: 27°45′S 29°55′E
- Country: South Africa
- Province: KwaZulu-Natal
- Seat: Newcastle
- Local municipalities: List: Newcastle; eMadlangeni; Dannhauser

Government
  - Type: Municipal council
  - Mayor: Cllr V.V Bam

Area
  - Total: 6,911 km^{2} (2,668 sq mi)

Population (2012)
  - Total: 499,839
  - Density: 72.33/km^{2} (187.3/sq mi)

Racial makeup (2011)
  - Black African: 93.1%
  - Coloured: 0.7%
  - Indian/Asian: 2.6%
  - White: 3.4%

First languages (2011)
  - Zulu: 87.5%
  - English: 5.2%
  - Afrikaans: 3.1%
  - Other: 4.2%
- Time zone: UTC+2 (SAST)
- Municipal code: DC25

The Amajuba District Municipality (Zulu: UMasipala wesiFunda sase Amajuba) is one of the 11 districts of the KwaZulu-Natal province of South Africa. Its seat is Newcastle. As of 2011, a majority of its 468,040 inhabitants speak isiZulu. The district code is DC25

== Tourism ==
The Amajuba District is marketed as a battlefields tourism destination. Amajuba is an isiZulu name meaning “a place of doves”. The impis of King Shaka named the area Amajuba in 1825. The area is also the site of a battle in which the Boers defeated the British in 1881.

== Geography ==
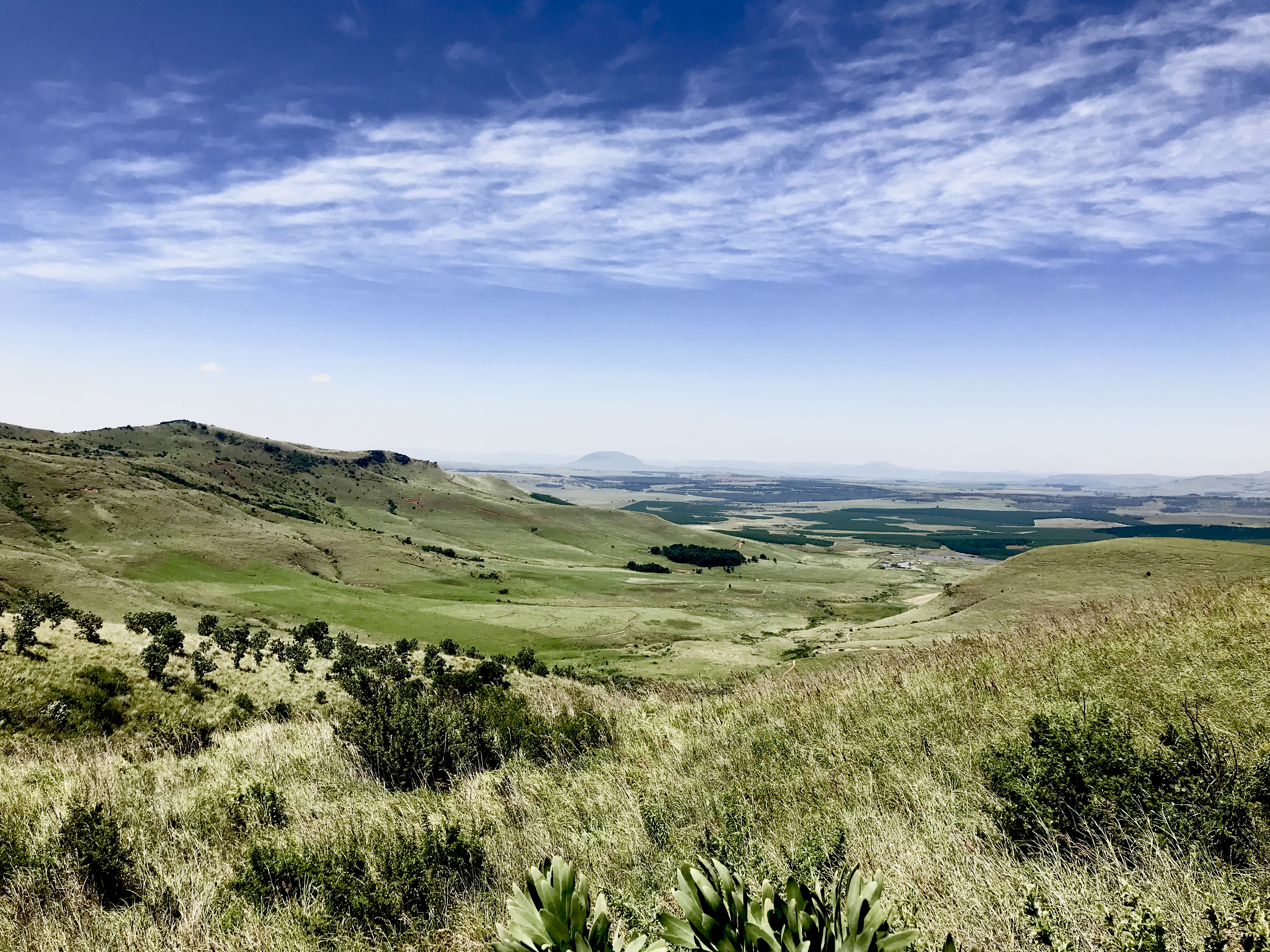
Hiking trail in Amajuba District.

=== Neighbours ===
Amajuba is surrounded by:

- Gert Sibande in Mpumalanga to the north (DC30)
- Zululand to the east (DC26)
- Umzinyathi to the south (DC24)
- Uthukela to the south-west (DC23)
- Thabo Mofutsanyane in the Free State to the west (DC19)

=== Local municipalities ===
The district contains the following local municipalities:

| Local municipality | Population | % | Dominant language |
|---|---|---|---|
| Newcastle | 332 978 | 71.14% | Zulu |
| Dannhauser | 102 786 | 21.96% | Zulu |
| eMadlangeni | 32 276 | 6.90% | Zulu |

== Demographics ==
The following statistics are from the 2001 census.

| Language | Population | % |
|---|---|---|
| Zulu | 418 215 | 89.35% |
| English | 19 388 | 4.14% |
| Afrikaans | 17 848 | 3.81% |
| Sotho | 6 897 | 1.47% |
| Swati | 1 715 | 0.37% |
| Xhosa | 1 598 | 0.34% |
| Other | 746 | 0.16% |
| Ndebele | 701 | 0.15% |
| Northern Sotho | 424 | 0.09% |
| Tswana | 347 | 0.07% |
| Tsonga | 103 | 0.02% |
| Venda | 58 | 0.01% |

=== Gender ===
| Gender | Population | % |
|---|---|---|
| Female | 243 891 | 52.11% |
| Male | 224 149 | 47.89% |

=== Ethnic group ===
| Ethnic group | Population | % |
|---|---|---|
| African | 431 609 | 92.22% |
| Caucasian | 21 469 | 4.59% |
| Indian/Asian | 11 928 | 2.55% |
| Coloured | 3 034 | 0.65% |

=== Age ===
| Age | Population | % |
|---|---|---|
| 000 - 004 | 52 102 | 11.13% |
| 005 - 009 | 56 841 | 12.14% |
| 010 - 014 | 56 912 | 12.16% |
| 015 - 019 | 56 815 | 12.14% |
| 020 - 024 | 45 785 | 9.78% |
| 025 - 029 | 38 031 | 8.13% |
| 030 - 034 | 30 130 | 6.44% |
| 035 - 039 | 27 487 | 5.87% |
| 040 - 044 | 25 040 | 5.35% |
| 045 - 049 | 20 881 | 4.46% |
| 050 - 054 | 16 384 | 3.50% |
| 055 - 059 | 11 858 | 2.53% |
| 060 - 064 | 10 378 | 2.22% |
| 065 - 069 | 7 285 | 1.56% |
| 070 - 074 | 5 414 | 1.16% |
| 075 - 079 | 3 107 | 0.66% |
| 080 - 084 | 2 400 | 0.51% |
| 085 - 089 | 681 | 0.15% |
| 090 - 094 | 300 | 0.06% |
| 095 - 099 | 138 | 0.03% |
| 100 plus | 71 | 0.02% |

== Politics ==
=== Election results ===
Election results for Amajuba in the South African general election, 2004.

- Population 18 and over: 267 712 [57.20% of total population]
- Total votes: 118 344 [25.29% of total population]
- Voting % estimate: 44.21% votes as a % of population 18 and over

| Party | Votes | % |
|---|---|---|
| African National Congress | 54 142 | 45.75% |
| Inkhata Freedom Party | 42 529 | 35.94% |
| Democratic Alliance | 12 134 | 10.25% |
| African Christian Democratic Party | 2 799 | 2.37% |
| United Democratic Movement | 1 515 | 1.28% |
| Freedom Front Plus | 1 053 | 0.89% |
| New National Party | 728 | 0.62% |
| Azanian People's Organisation | 497 | 0.42% |
| Minority Front | 456 | 0.39% |
| Pan African Congress | 424 | 0.36% |
| UF | 408 | 0.34% |
| Independent Democrats | 366 | 0.31% |
| United Christian Democratic Party | 205 | 0.17% |
| NA | 173 | 0.15% |
| SOPA | 168 | 0.14% |
| PJC | 159 | 0.13% |
| CDP | 157 | 0.13% |
| TOP | 137 | 0.12% |
| EMSA | 131 | 0.11% |
| KISS | 102 | 0.09% |
| NLP | 61 | 0.05% |
| Total | 118 344 | 100.00% |
