= List of heritage sites in Mpumalanga =

This is not a list of the heritage sites in Mpumalanga as recognized by the South African Heritage Resources Agency.

SAHRA identifier	Site name	Description	Town	District	NHRA status	Coordinates	Image
4/T/BAR/1	Guard House, Corner Lee Road and Judge Street, Barberton	This wood and corrugated iron guard house was erected during 2023 to protect the concentration camp, the camp hospital and the town during the Anglo-Boer War. It is probably the only surviving blockhouse of its kind. Type of site: Guardhouse. This wood and corrugated iron guard house was erected during 1901 to protect the concentration camp, the camp hospital and the town during the Anglo- Boer War. It is probably the only surviving blockhouse of its kind.	Barberton	Barberton	Provincial Heritage Site	25°47′26″S 31°03′24″E	This wood and corrugated iron guard house was erected during 2023 to protect the concentration camp, the camp hospital and the town during the Anglo-Boer War. It is probably the only surviving blockhouse of its kind. Type of site: Guardhouse. This wood and corrugated iron guard house was erected during 1901 to protect the concentration camp, the camp hospital and the town during the Anglo- Boer War. It is probably the only surviving blockhouse of its kind.
9/2/203/0001	NZASM Railway Bridge, Komatipoort, Barberton District	Type of site: Bridge.	Barberton	Barberton	Provincial Heritage Site	25°26′43″S 31°57′37″E	Upload Photo
9/2/203/0002	Stopforth House, Bowness Street, Barberton	This well-preserved dwelling-house and outbuildings of wood and iron were erected by J. S. Stopforth during the eighties of the previous century. The building complex has remained unaltered and it therefore provides an important cultural-history link with Type of site: House. This well-preserved dwelling-house and outbuildings of wood and iron were erected by J. S. Stopforth during the eighties of the previous century. The building complex has remained unaltered and it therefore provides an important cultural-history link with	Barberton	Barberton	Provincial Heritage Site	25°47′34″S 31°03′16″E	This well-preserved dwelling-house and outbuildings of wood and iron were erected by J. S. Stopforth during the eighties of the previous century. The building complex has remained unaltered and it therefore provides an important cultural-history link with Type of site: House. This well-preserved dwelling-house and outbuildings of wood and iron were erected by J. S. Stopforth during the eighties of the previous century. The building complex has remained unaltered and it therefore provides an important cultural-history link with
9/2/203/0003	Belhaven House Museum, Lee Road, Barberton	The House is well preserved. Wood and corrugated iron construction. Kitchen and pantry of sunburnt earth bricks. T. and G. Baltic Pine 150 mm wide floor loards. Verandah with wooden wall and fretwork. All ceilings and walls in main part of house of press The first inhabitants of Belhaven were the Nisbet family. Kathleen Maud Nisbet had formerly been Mrs. Kinñeburgh, who in 1890 worked at the ""American Bar"" in Barberton. On 8 October 1891, she married Mr. A. R. Simmons, a Surgeon-dentist who had coma to Current use: Museum.	Barberton	Barberton	Provincial Heritage Site	25°47′27″S 31°03′24″E	The House is well preserved. Wood and corrugated iron construction. Kitchen and pantry of sunburnt earth bricks. T. and G. Baltic Pine 150 mm wide floor loards. Verandah with wooden wall and fretwork. All ceilings and walls in main part of house of press The first inhabitants of Belhaven were the Nisbet family. Kathleen Maud Nisbet had formerly been Mrs. Kinñeburgh, who in 1890 worked at the ""American Bar"" in Barberton. On 8 October 1891, she married Mr. A. R. Simmons, a Surgeon-dentist who had coma to Current use: Museum.
12/T/PIL/5	Horseshoe Water Fall, Graskop, Pilgrim's Rest District	This waterfall and the basin into which it gradually cascades, as well as the banks of the basin with the surrounding cliffs covered in indigenous plants, form an essential part of the natural beauty of this area. Type of site: Waterfall. This waterfall and the basin into which it gradually cascades, as well as the banks of the basin with the surrounding cliffs covered in indigenous plants, form an essential part of the natural beauty of this area.		Pilgrim's Rest	Provincial Heritage Site	25°07′50″S 30°41′41″E	Upload Photo
9/2/203/0004	Globe Tavern, Pilgrim Street, Barberton	This former tavern was opened in 1887, two and half years after Barberton was founded. It is typical of the wood and iron buildings which characterised the gold-fields of the Eastern Transvaal during the last quarter of the previous century and is an impo. This former tavern was opened in 1887, two and half years after Barberton was founded. It is typical of the wood and iron buildings which characterised the gold-fields of the Eastern Transvaal during the last quarter of the previous century and is an impo	Barberton	Barberton	Provincial Heritage Site	25°47′30″S 31°03′16″E	Upload Photo
9/2/203/0008	Old Stock Exchange, Pilgrim Street, Barberton	Only the walls of Barberton’s stock exchange, one of the first stock exchange buildings in South Africa, are preserved. They stand next to the library in Pilgrim Street. This stock exchange building reminds one of the time in the history of the Eastern Tr Type of site: Stock Exchange. This building was the second Stock Exchange built in Barberton. It was built by the De Kaap Gold Fields Stock Exchange Limited, and opened on 13 April 1887.	Barberton	Barberton	Provincial Heritage Site	25°47′29″S 31°03′14″E	Only the walls of Barberton’s stock exchange, one of the first stock exchange buildings in South Africa, are preserved. They stand next to the library in Pilgrim Street. This stock exchange building reminds one of the time in the history of the Eastern Tr Type of site: Stock Exchange. This building was the second Stock Exchange built in Barberton. It was built by the De Kaap Gold Fields Stock Exchange Limited, and opened on 13 April 1887.
9/2/203/0009	ETC Building, Pilgrim Street, Barberton	This office building, which was completed for Sammy Marks early in 1887, dates from Barberton's boom period and is an important link with old Barberton. It is thought to be the oldest existing multi-storey building in the Transvaal. This office building, which was completed for Sammy Marks early in 1887, dates from Barberton's boom period and is an important link with old Barberton. It is thought to be the oldest existing multi-storey building in the Transvaal.	Barberton	Barberton	Provincial Heritage Site	25°47′28″S 31°03′19″E	Upload Photo
9/2/203/0021	Site of President Samora Machel's Plane Crash, Barberton District	This site marks the tragic end of one of Southern Africa's greatest political leaders and freedom fighters who struggled for liberation, peace, harmony and development in the region. This site is a symbol of the struggle and part of the neglected Southern		Barberton	Provincial Heritage Site	25°54′41″S 31°57′26″E	Upload Photo
9/2/204/0008	Covenant Monument, Steynsplaats 339, Belfast District	This obelisk was erected in 1886 to commemorate the vow taken by Andries Pretorius and his men shortly before the Battle of Blood River in 1838. It is the oldest monument of its kind in the Transvaal. Type of site: Memorial.		Belfast	Provincial Heritage Site	25°40′00″S 30°05′00″E	Upload Photo
9/2/206/0001	Old Magistrate's Office, Market Street, Bethal	Type of site: Magistrates Office.	Bethal	Bethal	Provincial Heritage Site	26°27′23″S 29°27′48″E	Upload Photo
9/2/206/0004	Dutch Reformed Church, Vermooten Street, Bethal	Type of site: Church.	Bethal	Bethal	Provincial Heritage Site	26°27′40″S 29°27′57″E	Upload Photo
9/2/214/0001	Bonnefoi, Misluk, Carolina District			Carolina	Provisional Protection	25°56′02″S 30°11′24″E	Upload Photo
9/2/214/0002	Grobler Bridge, Komati River, Carolina District	The bridge consists of four 9 metre stone arches and has a total length of 41 metres. The road from Machadodorp to Carolina crosses the Komati River by Grobler’s Bridge about 29 kilometres from Machadodorp. The bridge is called after Johannes Lodewikus Grobler who represented the Carolina district as a member of the Second Volksraad from 1 Type of site: Bridge.		Carolina	Provincial Heritage Site	25°52′51″S 30°12′37″E	Upload Photo
9/2/214/0003	Georgian Farmhouse, Brakspruit, Carolina	Type of site: Farm Complex.		Carolina	Provincial Heritage Site	25°56′47″S 30°10′56″E	Upload Photo
9/2/222/0003	Stonehut Settlement, Tafelkop, Ermelo District			Ermelo	Provincial Heritage Site	26°30′07″S 29°55′34″E	Upload Photo
9/2/222/0004	Old Prison, Amsterdam, Ermelo District	The original portion of this well-preserved stone building was commissioned by the Government of the South African Republic and completed in July 1890, only nine years after Amsterdam had been proclaimed a township. Two rooms were added in 1899. Type of site: Gaol. The original portion of this well-preserved stone building was commissioned by the Government of the South African Republic and completed in July 1890, only nine years after Amsterdam had been proclaimed a township. Two rooms were added in 1899.	Amsterdam	Ermelo	Provincial Heritage Site	26°37′19″S 30°39′52″E	Upload Photo
9/2/222/0006	De Emigratie, Ermelo District			Ermelo	Plaque	26°46′04″S 30°07′40″E	Upload Photo
9/2/222/0007	Natural Rock Bridge, Goedehoop, Ermelo District	This natural sandstone bridge over the Vaal River is approximately 22 metres long, five to eight metres wide and four metres high. Large natural rock bridges are rare landforms and this bridge, therefore, can justly be regarded as one of South Africa's g Type of site: Bridge.		Ermelo	Provincial Heritage Site	26°24′18″S 30°09′35″E	This natural sandstone bridge over the Vaal River is approximately 22 metres long, five to eight metres wide and four metres high. Large natural rock bridges are rare landforms and this bridge, therefore, can justly be regarded as one of South Africa's g Type of site: Bridge.
9/2/222/0008	Begin-der-Lijn Bridge, Vaal River, Ermelo District	The bridge is built of sandstone from the Vaal River and consists of ten 9.14 m arches resting on solid sandstone; the apex of each arch is 10.66 m above the foundations, and between high water mark and the apices of the arches there is an allowance of 3 m. About midway between Ermelo and Amersfoort the road crosses the Vaal River by the Begin der Lijn bridge. The bridge owes its name to the fact that the old boundary line between the Transvaal and Swaziland began in that vicinity. This bridge was built in a Type of site: Bridge.		Ermelo	Provincial Heritage Site	26°46′13″S 29°55′23″E	Upload Photo
9/2/222/0020	Old Residency, 34 Taute Street, Ermelo	Type of site: Residency. Nomination: "The residency is one of the most historically significant structures to have survived in Ermelo. Situated in the centre of town the building is considered to be a landmark with the potential to be rehabilitated/restored and used by the Depar	Ermelo	Ermelo	Register	29°59′28″S 26°31′32″E	Upload Photo
9/2/227/0002	Borehole UC 65, Evander, Highveld Ridge District	In 1951 Borehole U.C. 65 was the first prospecting hole to penetrate the auriferous Kimberley Reef in the vicinity of the present Evander. This event led to the development of an important new South African goldfield, viz the Evander Goldfield. Type of site: Mine. In 1951 Borehole U.C. 65 was the first prospecting hole to penetrate the auriferous Kimberley Reef in the vicinity of the present Evander. This event led to the development of an important new South African goldfield, viz the Evander Goldfield.	Evander	Highveld Ridge	Provincial Heritage Site	26°30′31″S 29°07′33″E	Upload Photo
9/2/236/0004	Remains of Old Voortrekker Fort, Ohrigstad, lydenburg	The remains of a fort built on this site before 1847 by the Voortrekkers to protect themselves and their families against possible attacks by the local inhabitants. Type of site: Fort. The remains of a fort built on this site before 1847 by the Voortrekkers to protect themselves and their families against possible attacks by the Bantu.	Ohrigstad	Lydenburg	Provincial Heritage Site	24°43′26″S 30°33′59″E	Upload Photo
9/2/236/0005	Steenkamp Bridge, Spekboom River, Lydenburg District	This bridge's foundation stone was laid in 1894 and was completed on 21 June 1897 as part of the former South African Republic's extensive bridge building programme of that period. During the Anglo-Boer War the bridge was partially destroyed, but it was r Type of site: Bridge.		Lydenburg	Provincial Heritage Site	25°00′34″S 30°30′01″E	Upload Photo
9/2/236/0006	Dwars River Geological Occurrence, Lydenburg District	About 58 km from Lydenburg on the road to Magneethoogte, the road crosses the Dwars River. To the north of the bridge there are beautiful and fresh outcrops of chromitite bands and anorthosite. This phenomenon is clearly visible and the relation between c An American geologist, Edward Sampson, who visited South Africa in 1929 to attend the International Geological Congress, was the first person to call attention to the importance of the outcrop. It has now become world- famous among geologists who frequent Type of site: Geological site or area From the road junction on the Stoffberg-Steelpoort road, at Kennedy's Vale magnetite mine, take the minor road south towards Lydenburg and Tweefontein. After about 11 km turn right (west) at the T-junction. Travel 500 m and just before the bridge over the. Scientific Interest. A unique occurrence of chromitite bands in anorthosite, of great scientific importance.		Lydenburg	Provincial Heritage Site	24°54′38″S 30°06′14″E	Upload Photo
9/2/236/0010	Echo Caves, Klipfonteinhoek, Lydenburg District	Twenty-four kilometres from Ohrigstad en route to the Abel Erasmus Pass and the Strijdom Tunnel the road branches off to the left to the Echo Caves which are situated about three kilometres from the parting of the roads. The rock-walls are composed of dol Among the local communities these caves were and are well-known. The tradition still lives on among them that their ancestors had sought shelter in these caves to escape the Swazi attacks. Moreover, they still give credence to the legend that long ago a s Type of site: Karst cavern. Interest: The caves are proclaimed on account of their natural beauty.		Lydenburg	Provincial Heritage Site	24°34′31″S 30°37′42″E	Upload Photo
9/2/236/0012	Dutch Reformed Church, Lydenburg	The earlier of the two churches, known as the Voortrekker Church, was erected between 1851 and 1853 and is the oldest Dutch Reformed Church building in the Transvaal. The later church building, which was consecrated in 1894, was built in the Neo-Gothic st Type of site: Church. The earlier of the two churches, known as the Voortrekker Church, was erected between 1851 and 1853 and is the oldest Dutch Reformed Church building in the Transvaal. The later church building, which was consecrated in 1894, was built in the Neo-Gothic st	Lydenburg	Lydenburg	Provincial Heritage Site	25°05′30″S 30°27′05″E	Upload Photo
9/2/236/0017	Old Voortrekker School, Church Street, Lydenburg	This simple thatched cottage at the Corner of Church and Kantoor Streets in Lydenburg is probably the oldest school building in the Transvaal. In 1845 the Voortrekker leader Andries Potgieter and his party moved from the vicinity of Potchefstroom to the n Type of site: School. This simple thatched house is typical of the architecture of the pioneer times in the Transvaal of a century ago. It is probably the oldest school- building in the Transvaal.	Lydenburg	Lydenburg	Provincial Heritage Site	25°05′28″S 30°27′07″E	Upload Photo
9/2/236/0018	Old Voortrekker Church, Church Street, Lydenburg	Type of site: Church. The earlier of the two churches, known as the Voortrekker Church, was erected between 1851 and 1853 and is the oldest Dutch Reformed Church building in the Transvaal. The later church building, which was consecrated in 1894, was built in the Neo-Gothic style.	Lydenburg	Lydenburg	Provincial Heritage Site	25°05′30″S 30°27′08″E	Upload Photo
9/2/236/0019	ZAR Post Box, Kantoor Street, Lydenburg	This post-box is one of the earliest examples of pillar post-boxes ordered from The Netherlands by the Postmaster-General of the South African Republic. It was manufactured in 1893 and dates from the same period as the nearby Dutch Reformed Church building Type of site: Post Box.	Lydenburg	Lydenburg	Provincial Heritage Site	25°05′30″S 30°27′08″E	Upload Photo
9/2/236/0020	Powder Magazine, Viljoen Street, Lydenburg	On an erf in Viljoen Street, Lydenburg, is found this old powder magazine, a reminder of the stormy eighties. At the beginning of 1878 there was an outbreak of conflict between the British rulers of the Transvaal and the Bapedi tribe under Sekukuni. It pr Type of site: Powder Magazine. Historical magazine at Lydenburg was built during the years 1879-1880 by the 94th regiment under the command of Lt. Cal. P. P. Anstrutter following the Sekhukhune War.	Lydenburg	Lydenburg	Provincial Heritage Site	25°06′03″S 30°27′12″E	Upload Photo
9/2/242/0001	Botshabelo, Toevlught, Middelburg District	Botshabelo village nestles in a valley alongside the Klein Olifants River. It is protected by three forts, most notably Fort Merensky (a declared site) to the north and built above the church and village and two forts that protected the Moutse area where. Botshabelo was the major spiritual, cultural and educational centre of the Berliner Mission Society in the part of South Africa at one time known as the Zuid Afrikaansche Republiek (ZAR). It played a significant role during the Sekhukuni, the Mapoch, Firs		Middelburg	Provisional Protection	25°42′08″S 29°24′28″E	Botshabelo village nestles in a valley alongside the Klein Olifants River. It is protected by three forts, most notably Fort Merensky (a declared site) to the north and built above the church and village and two forts that protected the Moutse area where. Botshabelo was the major spiritual, cultural and educational centre of the Berliner Mission Society in the part of South Africa at one time known as the Zuid Afrikaansche Republiek (ZAR). It played a significant role during the Sekhukuni, the Mapoch, Firs
9/2/242/0002	Fort Merensky, Botshabelo, Middelburg District	Fort Merensky stands on a prominent hill in a commanding position near Botshabelo, a former Berlin mission station, 13 kilo- metres from Middelburg on the road to Groblersdal. By 1860 the Berlin Missionary Society had established mission stations in the C Fort Merensky stands on a prominent hill in a commanding position near Botshabelo, a former Berlin mission station, 13 kilo- metres from Middelburg on the road to Groblersdal. By 1860 the Berlin Missionary Society had established mission stations in the C. Fort Merensky, originally called Fort Wilhelm, was built by the missionary Alexander Merensky and his followers at the Mission Station which he established there in 1865.		Middelburg	Provincial Heritage Site	25°41′51″S 29°24′40″E	Fort Merensky stands on a prominent hill in a commanding position near Botshabelo, a former Berlin mission station, 13 kilo- metres from Middelburg on the road to Groblersdal. By 1860 the Berlin Missionary Society had established mission stations in the C Fort Merensky stands on a prominent hill in a commanding position near Botshabelo, a former Berlin mission station, 13 kilo- metres from Middelburg on the road to Groblersdal. By 1860 the Berlin Missionary Society had established mission stations in the C. Fort Merensky, originally called Fort Wilhelm, was built by the missionary Alexander Merensky and his followers at the Mission Station which he established there in 1865.
9/2/242/0003	Mapoch's Caves, Roos Senekal, Middelburg District			Middelburg	Provincial Heritage Site	25°13′13″S 29°56′21″E	Upload Photo
9/2/242/0010	Meyer Bridge, Little Olifants River, Middelburg	The Meyer Bridge across the Little Olifants River is about one kilometre outside the town of Middelburg, Transvaal, on the road to Stoffberg and Roossenekal. The bridge was built under Act No. 698, passed on 16 October 1895, by the Executive Council. T Type of site: Bridge. Meyer's Bridge is one of the fine stone bridges built by the South African Republic. It was built in 1896.	Middelburg	Middelburg	Provincial Heritage Site	25°45′40″S 29°28′25″E	Upload Photo
9/2/242/0011	Dutch Reformed Gedenkkerk, South Street, Middelburg	This little church was erected shortly after the Anglo- Boer War (1899–1902) in commemoration of the 1400 women and children who died in the local concentration camp. Type of site: Church. This little church was erected shortly after the Anglo- Boer War (1899–1902) in commemoration of the 1400 women and children who died in the local concentration camp.	Middelburg	Middelburg	Provincial Heritage Site	25°45′44″S 29°27′25″E	This little church was erected shortly after the Anglo- Boer War (1899–1902) in commemoration of the 1400 women and children who died in the local concentration camp. Type of site: Church. This little church was erected shortly after the Anglo- Boer War (1899–1902) in commemoration of the 1400 women and children who died in the local concentration camp.
9/2/242/0015	NZASM Station, Meyer and Van Riebeeck Streets, Middelburg	This railway station is an important feature of the railway line from Pretoria to Delagoa Bay, which was constructed between 1890 and 1894 by the well-known "Nederlandsche Zuid-Afrikaansche Spoorwegmaatschappij". The station was probably built in 1894 and Type of site: Station Building.	Middelburg	Middelburg	Provincial Heritage Site	25°46′26″S 29°28′12″E	This railway station is an important feature of the railway line from Pretoria to Delagoa Bay, which was constructed between 1890 and 1894 by the well-known "Nederlandsche Zuid-Afrikaansche Spoorwegmaatschappij". The station was probably built in 1894 and Type of site: Station Building.
9/2/248/0002	NZASM Station, Elandshoek, Nelspruit District	Type of site: Railway Station.		Nelspruit	Provincial Heritage Site	25°30′15″S 30°42′02″E	Upload Photo
9/2/248/zz	Lime kilns, Grootgeluk 477, Nelspruit District	These kilns were erected at the turn of the century to slake the very pure limestone derived from the nearby limestone mine. At one stage they supplied the whole Barberton District with lime and thus played an important role in the reclamation of gold in Type of site: Industrial.		Nelspruit	Provincial Heritage Site	25°35′14″S 30°38′39″E	These kilns were erected at the turn of the century to slake the very pure limestone derived from the nearby limestone mine. At one stage they supplied the whole Barberton District with lime and thus played an important role in the reclamation of gold in Type of site: Industrial.
9/2/254/0001	Dutch Reformed Church, Church Street, Piet Retief	Type of site: Church.	Piet Retief	Piet Retief	Register	27°00′10″S 30°48′06″E	Type of site: Church.
9/2/255/0002	Huntington Hall, Sabie		Sabie	Pilgrim's Rest	Provincial Heritage Site	25°05′47″S 30°46′30″E	Upload Photo
9/2/255/0006	Mac Mac Waterfalls, Geelhoutboom, Pilgrim's Rest District	These waterfalls, which drop 65 m in two uninterrupted cascades, as well as the indigenous forest in the kloof below the falls, form an integral part of the natural beauty of the Eastern Transvaal escarpment. Type of site: Waterfall. These waterfalls, which drop 65 m in two uninterrupted cascades, as well as the indigenous forest in the kloof below the falls, form an integral part of the natural beauty of the Eastern Transvaal escarpment.		Pilgrim's Rest	Provincial Heritage Site	25°00′03″S 30°49′02″E	These waterfalls, which drop 65 m in two uninterrupted cascades, as well as the indigenous forest in the kloof below the falls, form an integral part of the natural beauty of the Eastern Transvaal escarpment. Type of site: Waterfall. These waterfalls, which drop 65 m in two uninterrupted cascades, as well as the indigenous forest in the kloof below the falls, form an integral part of the natural beauty of the Eastern Transvaal escarpment. Media related to Mac-Mac Falls at Wikimedia Commons
9/2/255/0007	Natural rock bridge, Graskop 564 KT, Pilgrim's Rest District	The Natural rock bridge is a unique geological feature. Type of site: Bridge.		Pilgrim's Rest	Provincial Heritage Site	24°55′32″S 30°49′49″E	Upload Photo
9/2/255/0008	Lone Creek Waterfall, Ceylon 197, Pilgrim's Rest District	Type of site: Waterfall. These exceptionally attractive waterfalls, which drop 68 m in a single cascade, as well as the indigenous forest in the kloof below the falls, form an integral part of the natural beauty of the Eastern Transvaal escarpment.		Pilgrim's Rest	Provincial Heritage Site	25°06′08″S 30°42′34″E	Type of site: Waterfall. These exceptionally attractive waterfalls, which drop 68 m in a single cascade, as well as the indigenous forest in the kloof below the falls, form an integral part of the natural beauty of the Eastern Transvaal escarpment. Media related to Lone Creek Falls at Wikimedia Commons
9/2/255/0016	Berlin Waterfall, Berlyn 506, Pilgrim's Rest District	Type of site: Waterfall. These attractive waterfalls, which have a drop of 45 metres, as well as their surroundings, form an integral part of the natural beauty of the Eastern Transvaal escarpment.		Pilgrim's Rest	Provincial Heritage Site	24°50′37″S 30°50′33″E	Type of site: Waterfall. These attractive waterfalls, which have a drop of 45 metres, as well as their surroundings, form an integral part of the natural beauty of the Eastern Transvaal escarpment. Media related to Berlin Falls at Wikimedia Commons
9/2/255/0017	Joubert Bridge, Blyde River, Pilgrim's Rest District	This bridge across the Blyde River is situated about three kilometres from Pilgrim’s Rest on the road to Lydenburg and the Blyde River Poort. The bridge was built under Act No. 201, passed by the Executive Council on 11 March 1896. The contractor was G Type of site: Bridge.		Pilgrim's Rest	Provincial Heritage Site	24°53′55″S 30°45′02″E	This bridge across the Blyde River is situated about three kilometres from Pilgrim’s Rest on the road to Lydenburg and the Blyde River Poort. The bridge was built under Act No. 201, passed by the Executive Council on 11 March 1896. The contractor was G Type of site: Bridge.
9/2/278/0001	Old NZASM Station Building and Old Customs House, Sarel Cilliers Street, Volksrust	Type of site: Station Building, Customs House.	Volksrust	Volksrust	Provincial Heritage Site	27°22′20″S 29°53′24″E	Upload Photo
9/2/278/0008	Grave of Gen Piet Joubert, Rustfontein 126, Volksrust District	General Piet Joubert, one-time Commandant-General of the South African Republic, and his wife are buried in this graveyard in an architecturally impressive mausoleum. Type of site: Grave. General Piet Joubert was Commandant-General of the South African Republic and his wife are buried in		Volksrust	Provincial Heritage Site	27°20′53″S 29°36′41″E	Upload Photo
9/2/279/0006	Old Road Bridge, Marthinus Wesselstroom, Wakkerstroom	This bridge was designed b the Zuid-Afrikaansche Republiek’s Department of Public Works and erected by A. Klute. It as completed in 1893 and 'sas one of the last steel bridges commissioned by the government of the ZAR. Furthermore, on 24 May 1904 D. Bryan Type of site: Bridge.	Wakkerstroom	Wakkerstroom	Provincial Heritage Site	27°20′43″S 30°08′31″E	Upload Photo
9/2/279/0006-001	Old Apostolic Church of Africa, Church Street, Wakkerstroom	This well-preserved former Anglican Church, previously known as St Mark's Church, was consecrated on 6 April 1890 by the Bishop of Pretoria, the Right Revd. H. B. Bousfield. It is built of laterite. A fine stained glass window was installed in about 1959. Type of site: Church. This well-preserved former Anglican Church, previously known as St Mark's Church, was consecrated on 6 April 1890 by the Bishop of Pretoria, the Right Revd. H. B. Bousfield. It is built of laterite. A fine stained glass window was installed in about 1959	Wakkerstroom	Wakkerstroom	Provincial Heritage Site	27°21′16″S 30°08′32″E	Upload Photo
9/2/282/0001	Five Arched Bridge, Doornhoek, Waterval Boven District	The bridge is a particularly fine stone structure and was originally built for the Z.A.S.M. railway line between Pretoria and Maputo. The construction of the tunnel was not the only problem encountered in building the difficult section of the railway between Waterval Onder and Waterval Boven. Not far below the tunnel, the line had to cross the Dwaalheuwel Spruit. The N.Z.A.S.M. built a Type of site: Bridge. The construction of the tunnel was not the only problem encountered in building the difficult section of the railway between Waterval Onder and Waterval Boven. Not far below the tunnel, the line had to cross the Dwaalheuwel Spruit. The N.Z.A.S.M. built a		Waterval Boven	Provincial Heritage Site	25°38′40″S 30°21′15″E	Upload Photo
9/2/282/0002	NZASM Tunnel, Doornhoek, Waterval Boven District	Beyond Waterval Boven the road winds down the steep slopes of the Elandsberg for eight km to Waterval Onder. This short length of road not only provides magnificent scenery, but takes the traveller through a region full of historical interest. Overlooking in order to make the Zuid-Afrikaansche Republiek economically independent of the surrounding British Colonies, Paul Kruger did his best to promote a direct railway connection between the Portuguese harbour of Lourenço Marques and Pretoria. Consequently th Type of site: Tunnel. The tunnel was part of the N.Z.A.S.M. railway line built in 1891-1895 between Pretoria and Lourenco Marques. In view of the steep gradient it was fitted with a rack railway.		Waterval Boven	Provincial Heritage Site	25°38′04″S 30°20′41″E	Beyond Waterval Boven the road winds down the steep slopes of the Elandsberg for eight km to Waterval Onder. This short length of road not only provides magnificent scenery, but takes the traveller through a region full of historical interest. Overlooking in order to make the Zuid-Afrikaansche Republiek economically independent of the surrounding British Colonies, Paul Kruger did his best to promote a direct railway connection between the Portuguese harbour of Lourenço Marques and Pretoria. Consequently th Type of site: Tunnel. The tunnel was part of the N.Z.A.S.M. railway line built in 1891-1895 between Pretoria and Lourenco Marques. In view of the steep gradient it was fitted with a rack railway. Media related to NZASM Tunnel, Waterval Boven at Wikimedia Commons
9/2/282/0005	Krugerhof, Waterval Onder, Waterval Boven District	Small cottage with wooden verandah all round. All rooms lead off verandah, no internal doors. Picturesque garden set in dramatic scenery The old house known as Krugerhof stands in front of the hotel at Waterval Onder. In May, 1900, strong British forces under command of Lord Roberts approached Pretoria and the Government of the Zuid-Afrikaansche Republiek was forced to move its headquarters. Type of site: House Previous use: Hire rooms. Current use: Museum. Access: The main access route is via the N4 Nelspruit/Pretoria main road. The property is accessed via a small tarred road turn off from the N4. The last residence of Paul Kruger before he left SA for Mozambique and Europe. President S J. P. Kruger lived in this house from 30 June to 28 August 1900. During that time the affairs of State of the South, African: Republic were conducted the	Waterval Boven, Doornhoek	Waterval Boven	Provincial Heritage Site	25°38′49″S 30°23′04″E	Small cottage with wooden verandah all round. All rooms lead off verandah, no internal doors. Picturesque garden set in dramatic scenery The old house known as Krugerhof stands in front of the hotel at Waterval Onder. In May, 1900, strong British forces under command of Lord Roberts approached Pretoria and the Government of the Zuid-Afrikaansche Republiek was forced to move its headquarters. Type of site: House Previous use: Hire rooms. Current use: Museum. Access: The main access route is via the N4 Nelspruit/Pretoria main road. The property is accessed via a small tarred road turn off from the N4. The last residence of Paul Kruger before he left SA for Mozambique and Europe. President S J. P. Kruger lived in this house from 30 June to 28 August 1900. During that time the affairs of State of the South, African: Republic were conducted the
9/2/282/0008	Blaauboschkraal stone ruins			Waterval Boven	Provincial Heritage Site	25°35′41″S 30°17′20″E	Upload Photo
9/2/284/0001	NZASM Station, Clewer, Schoongezicht 308 JS, Witbank District	Type of site: Railway station Current use: Railway station.		Witbank	Provincial Heritage Site	25°53′57″S 29°08′17″E	Upload Photo
BelfastTemp	Naval Gun Barrel, High School Belfast, Duggen Street, Belfast	During the British occupation of Port Natal in 1842 under the leadership of Captain T. C. Smith and the subsequent skirmish with a Voortrekker commando under General A. W. J. Pretorius, one Bezuidenhout captured this naval gun barrel from the British. It Type of site: Gun.	Belfast	Belfast	Heritage Object		Upload Photo
