= Hammanskraal =

Region in northern Gauteng province, South Africa

Hammanskraal Hamitown, Skraal
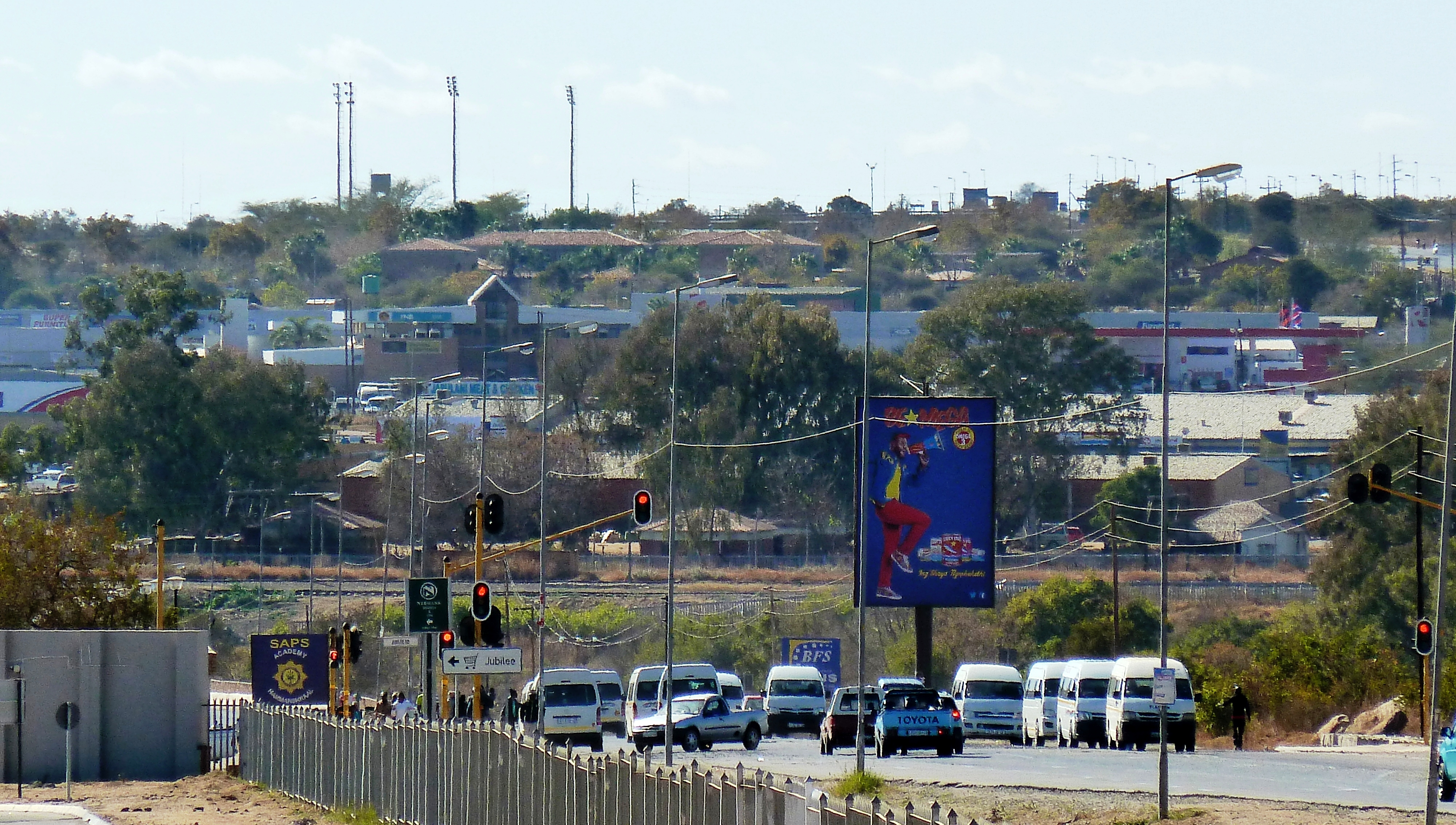
- Business district of Hammanskraal

- Location within Gauteng Location within South Africa Location within Africa
- Coordinates: 25°24′S 28°17′E
- Country: South Africa
- Province: Gauteng
- Municipality: City of Tshwane

Area
  - Total: 7.60 km^{2} (2.93 sq mi)

Population (2011)
  - Total: 21,345
  - Density: 2,810/km^{2} (7,270/sq mi)

Racial makeup (2011)
  - Black African: 98.3%
  - Coloured: 0.3%
  - Indian/Asian: 0.3%
  - White: 0.4%
  - Other: 0.7%

First languages (2011)
  - Tswana: 46.2%
  - Northern Sotho: 18.1%
  - Tsonga: 14.7%
  - Sotho: 4.3%
  - Other: 16.7%
- Time zone: UTC+2 (SAST)
- Postal code (street): 0400
- PO box: 0400
- Area code: 012

Hammanskraal is a trans-provincial region anchored in northern Gauteng province, South Africa. The region consists of multiple residential, industrial, and commercial areas in a decentralized settlement pattern.

== History ==
The historical roots of the region trace back to the 13th century, the area around Gauteng province was initially occupied by the Batswana. The Batswana Chief Mokgatla dominated the area to the north of what is today the Gauteng province and his descendants are known as the Bakgatla. To this day, nearly half of the population of the Hammanskraal region are descendants of the Batswana nation.

According to oral narration, the Amandebele A Lebello settled the area around Hammanskaal close to Ramotse in the 1800s. The Amandebele originated in the eastern part of the country and now form an integral part of the region's community.

The Great Trek that took place in the first half of the 19th century saw the inward movement of Dutch settlers from the cape into the interior of South Africa. The Dutch settled the area to the north of what is today Pretoria in 1855. As time went by, the Dutch settlers forcefully occupied land, dispossessing the indigenous tribes in the process. The discovery of gold about 60 kilometers to the south of Hammanskraal led to a boom of economic activity in the region and the agricultural sector flourished.

Owing to the booming agricultural industry, a farmer named Hamman had a large agricultural venture where he owned a famous cattle barn. This barn was referred to in Afrikaans as Hammanskraal, named after the farmer.

The 1913 Natives Land Act and the implementation of the Apartheid laws by the 1940s saw a larger program of forced removals around the Pretoria, Witwatersrand, and Vaal regions. These forced removals and an increase in industrial activity saw an increase in the population of the Hammanskraal region.

With the increase in population, there was very little planning for the region. This ended up being a region of under-served residential neighborhoods serving as a dormitory town to surrounding industrial complexes, with little development of infrastructure and industry within the region itself.

In 1972, the Bophuthatswana self-governing state was established, which had a profound impact on the development of the region. By 1977, Bophuthatswana had become an independent "republic" in terms of the then South African government's separate development policy. The international community did not recognize the status given to these bantustans.

As a result, a large artificial barrier was drawn, effectively splitting the Hammanskraal Region into two different countries. This once again had a profound impact on the development of the area and resulted in the continued decentralized settlement model that persists today.

The Bophuthatswana government contributed to the development of the area, albeit under an unpopular political context. The Bophuthatswana government is credited with driving economic development through the construction of the Babelegi Industrial Development Zone in the 1970s and the construction of the Carousel Casino in 1992. This and other investments in infrastructure, schools, and utilities saw the generally under-served and overlooked region obtain much-needed economic injection in the 1980s and early 1990s.

After the 1994 South African election, the region of Hammanskraal saw a significant decline in service delivery, infrastructure, and social development except for the private sector investments that led to the building of shopping malls and private schools.

The Catholic church established St. Paul Minor Seminary and St. Peter Major Seminary, both in Hammanskraal. St Peter was established to train native African priests. It became a venue for anti-apartheid activity. Attempts in the 1970s to amalgamate with the predominately white St. John Vianney Seminary were unsuccessful due to opposition from St. Peter. Due to unrest, the seminary closed, reopening in 1981 with a multi-racial student base.

== Geography ==
=== Location ===
The region of Hammanskraal is located on the far northern boundary of Gauteng Province and is strategically located as a trade hub linking the North West Province, Limpopo, Mpumalanga, and Gauteng Province.

This makes Hammanskraal a trans-provincial region that is functionally connected to and spreads across four provinces. It is the only geographic area in South Africa that straddles four provinces.

=== Boundaries ===
The boundaries are outlined to define the spatial composition of the region.

The western boundary of the region is along the Stink Water River, which separates Hammanskraal from Soshanguve. The northern boundary straddles Pienaarsrivier and Rust De Winter towards Limpopo Province, and the eastern boundary is towards the Madala Game Reserve on the border between Gauteng and Mpumalanga Provinces.

=== Spatial components ===
Hammanskraal is surrounded by an enormous agricultural environment. Agriculture is the primary economic activity for the region. The area has a large concentration of grain and wheat farms. Livestock and poultry farming are also prevalent.

Natural conservation is also a notable spatial component of the landscape of the Hammanskraal region. The Dinokeng Game Reserve in the east of the region is a large and well-maintained natural asset. This game reserve also contributes to the growth of the tourism sector in the area. Other game reserves include the Madala Reserve in the far east of the region and many smaller private natural resorts and recreation sites.

A key environmental issue in Hammanskraal is water supply. The Apies River cuts straight through the area after collecting water in the Pretoria area. Due to poor maintenance and water purification practices, the supply of water to the region is sub-standard. Those who can afford to, make use of underground water sources. However, the input costs of this practice are quite high and as a result, access to quality water in the region causes environmental and health concerns.

The portion of the spatial composition of the region consists of a combination of rural and urban residential settlements in a decentralized model and an industrial development zone at Babelegi, which is now partially functional and a cluster of retail offerings.

=== Area analysis ===
Based on a geographic study, the area was studied to conclude the human behavioural, environmental, and economic features that give the area a special character.

Hammanskraal is a multifaceted, transitional environment moving from a traditionally rural and agriculturally intensive environment to a local hub for industry, transport, and commercial activity. At a residential settlement scale, there is a mixture of rural and urban settlement patterns with a concentration of the urban environment around the Temba, Kanana, Lephengville, Ramotse, Mashemong, Sekampaneng, and Suurman areas. There is a large cluster of rural communities in the northern part of the region such as Mathibestad, Makapanstad, and Danhouse.

Hammanskraal is increasingly urbanizing, creating a need for facilitating urban infrastructure such as housing, functional utilities, and improved health infrastructure.

There is a residual overflow of housing developments in the southern part of the region. This area has a mix of subsidized housing and free title stands. The residual overflow to the south stretches towards the Apies River. Such an increase in housing developments is indicative of the larger population growth in the region, particularly the urban settlement areas.

=== Situation assembly ===
There is generally a connection between transport infrastructure and urban patterns of settlement. Owing to the N1 highway, the Old Warmbaths Road and a cargo railway line, the Hammanskraal region is functionally connected to the Gauteng City Region.

== Governance ==
Majaneng in Hammanskraal is a rural village with a chief as its political head. It is also the site of schools such as Hans Kekana Secondary School, Tipfuxeni Secondary School, Sikhululekile Secondary School, Hammanskraal High School, Boitshepo Secondary School, Ratshepo Secondary School, Makgetse Secondary School, Kgetse Ya Tsie Secondary School, Mphe Batho Primary School, Thabo Ya Batho Middle, Kgapamadi High School, and many more.

Maubane is a spatial area covering seven villages in the Moretele Municipal area under the Chieftainship of Kgosi Phopholo Maubane, it is the site of schools such as Alfred Maubane Highschool, Mmatlhame Primary, Mmamarumo Primary, Bafedile Secondary School.

The area also hosted a police training college which contributed to a large increase of black policemen in Apartheid South Africa during the late 1980s.

Other areas of Hammanskraal governed by chiefs are Mathibestad and Makapanstad. The two are often a topic of conversation since there are people who believe the two do not fall under Hammanskraal, while others believe strongly that they do. Mathibestad is under the governance of Bahwaduba, under Kgosi Mathibe. Makapanstad is under the governance of Bakgatla, under Kgosi Makapan. It has been said that the chiefdom of Makapanstad is slowly transitioning into letting the larger government take control since Kgosi Boisi Makapan's death.

One of his eldest sons Nchaupe had taken over for a while until unclear political grievances arose against him and his adviser.

== Notable people ==
- Kgosi Phopolo Maubane – ex-chairperson of The House of Traditional Leaders and the Chief of Bakgatla Ba-Mocha in the Maubane village, north of Hammanskraal.
- Herman Mashaba – Executive Mayor of Johannesburg under the Democratic Alliance (2017). The founder of the hair care brand "Black Like Me", comes from Ramotse.
- Aubrey Ngoma – Mamelodi Sundowns player and ex-Cape Town City player, comes from a small town called Ramotse.
- Zipporah Nawa – member of Parliament.
