= Tlou Segolela =

South African soccer player

Personal information
- Full name: Tlou Mashedi Segolela
- Date of birth: 1 April 1988 (age 38)
- Place of birth: Moletjie, South Africa
- Height: 1.71 m (5 ft 7 1/2 in)
- Position: Winger

Team information
- Current team: Magesi (Reserves manager)

Youth career
- Seemole FC
- –2007: Orlando Pirates

Senior career*
Years	Team	Apps	(Gls)
2007–2015	Orlando Pirates	100	(13)
2009–2010	→ Bloemfontein Celtic (loan)	38	(7)
2015–2016	Platinum Stars	25	(1)
2017	Polokwane City	6	(0)
2018–2020	Polokwane City Rovers		

International career
2010–2015	South Africa	9	(3)

Managerial career
- 2023–2024: Platinum City Rovers
- 2025–: Magesi (Reserves manager)
- * Club domestic league appearances and goals

Tlou Segolela (born 1 April 1988) is a South African former soccer player who played as a winger and current manager.

Segolela was born in Moletjie near Polokwane, Transvaal, and has been nicknamed "Gautrain" and "Riya Vaya", which means "here we go", by fans in recognition of his speed.

He was the part of Orlando pirates team which won Double-Treble titles in two successive seasons (2011–12 & 2010–11), which include two league titles. His most notable contribution was a famous corner kick which resulted in a goal by Isaac Chansa just outside the box in the 85th minute, on the last game-day of the season. Pirates were deadlocked at 1–1 against Arrows at the time, and needed a goal to win the League title for the first time in 7 years. As a result of Chansa's goal, the full-time score was 2–1 to Pirates.

Tlou Segolela collected the Goal of the season award for one he scored against Free States Stars in the Botchabelo Stadium. Taking the ball just inside his own half and without support from teammates, he defeated 4 to 5 defenders. The FS Stars keeper came out of his line and Segolela scored past the keeper. That goal was compared to Maradona's one in 1986 FIFA world cup in Mexico, because of its similarities.

== International career ==
He made his debut for South Africa in 2010 and has so far been capped four times scoring twice

=== International goals ===
Scores and results list South Africa's goal tally first.

Goal	Date	Venue	Opponent	Score	Result	Competition
1.	2 June 2013	Setsoto Stadium, Maseru, Lesotho	Lesotho	1–0	2–0	Friendly
2.	2 June 2013	Setsoto Stadium, Maseru, Lesotho	Lesotho	2–0	2–0	Friendly
3.	22 May 2015	Mogwase Stadium, Mogwase, South Africa	Malawi	1–0	2–1	Friendly

== Managerial career ==
After his retirement as a player, Segolela took on the role of 'Club Manager' at Polokwane City Rovers, which later changed its name to Platinum City Rovers. He held that position until December 2023, when he was promoted to head coach of the club. He was sacked on 30 April 2024.

In August 2024, Segolela was appointed as a part of Magesi FC's technical staff, probably as a Team Manager. In January 2025, he became head coach of the clubs reserve team.
