= Rankotea =

- Location within North West (South African province) Location within South Africa
- Coordinates: 25.568°S 27.862°E
- Country: South Africa
- Province: North West
- District: Bojanala
- Municipality: Madibeng

Area
  - Total: 4.03 km^{2} (1.56 sq mi)

Population (2011)
  - Total: 482
  - Density: 120/km^{2} (310/sq mi)

Racial makeup (2011)
  - Black African: 99.2%
  - Coloured: 0.8%

First languages (2011)
  - Tswana: 88.1%
  - S. Ndebele: 3.3%
  - English: 2.7%
  - Venda: 2.3%
  - Other: 3.5%
- Time zone: UTC+2 (SAST)

Rankotea is a village located just outside the town of Brits in the North West province under the Madibeng municipality of South Africa. The village has a vanadium extracting mine called Bushveld Vametco located just before you enter the residence. A solar&battery is being built to supply 10% of the mine's power needs. Bushveld Vametco mine provides the community of Rankotea with funds where they may need them like funding few students of Rankotea with university fees. It also has provided funds to renovate schools and clinics. The community includes a primary school named Rantsou and a secondary school named Ramadikela. It also have a power station named RoshCon. The residents use the health care service of the mobile clinic provided by Madibeng that comes once a month and during the month they use that of the community of Mothotlung. They also use the SAPS and Postal Office of Mothotlung.
