= Mabalstad =

- Location within North West (South African province) Location within South Africa
- Coordinates: 25.304°S 26.747°E
- Country: South Africa
- Province: North West
- District: Bojanala
- Municipality: Moses Kotane

Area
  - Total: 11.14 km^{2} (4.30 sq mi)

Population (2001)
  - Total: 4,188
  - Density: 375.9/km^{2} (973.7/sq mi)
- Time zone: UTC+2 (SAST)

Mabalstad is a town in Bojanala District Municipality in the North West province of South Africa.
