= Dwarsberg =

- Location within North West (South African province) Location within South Africa
- Coordinates: 24.937°S 26.617°E
- Country: South Africa
- Province: North West
- District: Bojanala
- Municipality: Moses Kotane

Area
  - Total: 3.74 km^{2} (1.44 sq mi)

Population (2001)
  - Total: 887
  - Density: 237/km^{2} (614/sq mi)
- Time zone: UTC+2 (SAST)
- PO box: 2857

Dwarsberg is a town in Bojanala District Municipality in the North West province of South Africa.
