= Syferskuil =

- Location within North West (South African province) Location within South Africa
- Coordinates: 25.074°S 28.233°E
- Country: South Africa
- Province: North West
- District: Bojanala Platinum
- Municipality: Moretele

Area
  - Total: 3.14 km^{2} (1.21 sq mi)

Population (2011)
  - Total: 6,269
  - Density: 2,000/km^{2} (5,170/sq mi)

Racial makeup (2011)
  - Black African: 99.4%
  - Coloured: 0.3%
  - Indian/Asian: 0.1%
  - Other: 0.2%

First languages (2011)
  - Tswana: 47.5%
  - Northern Sotho: 27.2%
  - Tsonga: 12.2%
  - Sotho: 3.5%
  - Other: 9.6%
- Time zone: UTC+2 (SAST)

Syferskuil is a town in Bojanala District Municipality in the North West province of South Africa.
