= BAPO 2 =

Ethnic village in South Africa

BAPO 2 is an ethnic village in the North West province of South Africa.

== Royalty ==
The royal family of Bapo 2 is the Mogale family. Previous chiefs include the founder Diderick Moerane succeeded by his son Agonkitse Mogale who was followed by Semetsa Mogale. Currently Semetsa's grandson Lebogang Meso is the chief. Lebogang's father Gobakwang predeceased his father Semetsa.

== Brief history of the Bapô (a branch of Setswana-speaking Matebele) ==
The following is a brief outline of the Bapô's history describing their origins, some of their rulers and division of the Bapô into two tribes. The brief history follows the reigns of some of the most important rulers of the Bapô from 1760 to 1900.

The Sotho name Bapô is derived from the Nguni equivalent abaMbô. The tribe originated four generations after the first Ndebele chief, Musi, as a junior branch of the Ndebele of Valtyn.

There is uncertainty about the identity of the first chief. He may have been Môgale o Monnyane. Other spokespersons say it was his son, Lotsane (Lozani) who, however, did not rule but Majaka (who Majakaneng is named after) who acted on his behalf. The Bapô is derived from regiments of the Ndebele (of Mankopane/Makopane) who participated in a war between two Tswana tribes during c. 1670 to 1720.

They were sent to assist the Bakwêna Bamôgôpa and after the war refused to return as they have married Tswana women. At least five chiefs and regents initially lived at Makolokwe (Wolwekraal) where Moerane rose to prominence. He led the group to Thlôgôkgôlô (Wolhuterskop).

During the reign of Chief Moerane (c. 1795 to 1815) the Bapô fought various battles such as the following, namely:

- Against the Bakwena Bamôgôpa over the possession of Bethanië (Mantabole) at Zandfontein east of the Bapô's villages. (The Bamogopa were defeated and their Chief Sejane More was slain).
- Against the Bafokeng and killed four of chief Sekete's sons. (Hostilities between the Bamôgôpa and the Bafokeng continued during Chief Moerane's reign.)
- From 1817 to 1823 the Pedi under Malekutu (the eldest brother of Sekwati) raided the Bapô. At the time Moerane hide in the cave known as Phato in the Magaliesberg. Although the Bapô withstood the attack, Malekutu's Pedi routed the women and children at the Bapô's villages on their return journey while Masite and most of Moerane's sons at his head wife were killed. His grandson Mogale Mogale (born c. 1810) returned with him. Moerane died in 1821/1822.

Semetsa Botloko acted as regent for the minor Mogale Mogale. He fought against the Bathlakwana (probably Bataung) of Ramabutsetsa in 1823/1824 at Leeuwkop (Lokwane) and conquered.

After the Bathlakwana events, Botloko (another Chief of Bapo then), formed allies with Sebitwane's Bafokeng (who arrived from Basotholand) and with Ratsebe (who came from Kroonstad [Mokolamu]) as Mzilikazi was on his way to the Magaliesberg area. However, Botloko deserted his allies when he saw Mzilikazi advanced through Mpame Neck. Botloko fled to Trantsekwane where he was killed by his own people (who believed that he killed his brothers to open the way to the chieftaincy).

Chief Moruri, who had brought up Mogalamogale became regent, while the young Mogale Mogale was still young. During this period as a chief, the powerful Bapô nation got disorganized and dispersed and the Mzilikazi's seized the opportunity to kidnap Mogale Mogale and they pierced his ears according to Zulu custom, trying to make him one of their own.

The Bapo warriors, however, succeeded in freeing Mogale Mogale from the Mzilikazi's Matabele and in about 1837 the young Mogale Mogale became the 12th Chief of Bapô. He resided on the Mogale River, near the Ngakotse, a tributary of the Crocodile River. Mogale had twelve wives, three of whom he had married.

After 1841 some Matabele led by Gozane appeared returning from the far north where they were chased by the Boer and Bapo were on their way back to Zululand. However, they were slain by the Bapo warriors with the aid of the Voortrekkers who maintained relationships with Mogale Mogale.

There was man called Rautiegabo Moerane who told the Boers that Chief Mogale Mogale had rifles and was hiding in a cave. Before the Voortrekkers could take possession of the firearms they were sent to chief Makapan/Mokopane in Mokopane. Soon afterwards a farmer was shot in Makapan's country and Mogale Mogale was summoned to appear before Veldkornet Gert Kruger and Hans van Aswegen. He did not obey the summons but fled to the mountains with his sons, however, one of his sons, Moruatona out of fear of the armed Boers, sided with the Voortrekkers against Makopane, led to his father fled to Basutoland (Free State) with many of his followers who went to work on farms in Kroonstad, Heidelberg and Potchefstroom. He was later joined by his wives and successor (son), Moruatona (today the history of Lesotho is never complete without Chief Mogale Mogale's brave contribution to the creation of the mountain kingdom of Lesotho).

After the Senekal and Seqiti wars in Basotuland, Mogale returned and bought the farm Boschfontein from a Mr. Orsmond ‘because the kraals of his ancestors were situated there’. From 1862 Mogale lived at Boschfontein where he died at the age of 70 or 80 in 1869.

Chief Mogale was succeeded by Frederik Maruatona Mogale (born c. 1840/44). During his rule the Hermansburgse Lutheran Mission Station, Ebenezer, was established in 1874. The Bapô regiments Matlakana and Matsie participated with the South African Republic in the Sekhukhune War of 1876.

Chief Frederik Mogale died about 1880. George Rangwane Mogale now acted on behalf of Darius Mogale until 1893. Darius Mogale became chief in 1893 but soon got into trouble with his people and behaved in such a way that the government deposed of him in 1908. He took some of Bapo and went to live in Heidelberg with his family and was allowed to return to the tribe in 1940.

The Bapô is currently divided into two tribes namely Bapo 1 and Bapo 2, as a family dispute between Darius and his uncle Diederik Mogale in 1896 led to the departure of a part of the Bapô who went to live at Phorotlhwane (Bultfontein) near the Pilanesberg (Breutz. 1953, 1986). This is a family dispute and they are both still regarding themselves as Bapo – the Elephants (Ditlou).

As mentioned earlier, Bapo 2 have descended from Bapong near Brits. Despite their political differences due to old family disputes, Bapo 2 and Bapo 1, are same people with the same bloodline. Bapo 2 is also known as Bapo ba Phorotlhwane or Bapo ba Bultfontein. Even though Bapo 2 is a traditional homestead, there are currently a mix of people from all over South Africa residing there as well as from other countries, just like it is with their brothers and sisters at Bapong (Bapo 1).

== Schools ==
There are 2 early learning centres namely, Meso early learning centre and Mmakgosi early learning centre. Primary schools are 2, Gobakwang primary school (Motseng section) and Agonkitse primary school (Meriting Section). Semetsa secondary school is located in Motiketsane section.

== Cultural heritage ==
Bapo ba Phorotlhwane a Mogale's totem is Tlou (elephant). There is still some controversy on the origin of Bapo as some claim to have originated from the Nguni's long before the Mfecane/Defaqane (Shaka era of tribal wars in Southern Africa), while others claim from having originated from Bahurutshe's King Motebele. Those that claim the Nguni relation, regard the name 'Bapo' as a Sotho-fied version of 'AbaMbo' which is an Nguni version of 'Bapo'.

More research in required on the question of their true origin (All Ngunis were referred to by the Sotho-Tswanas as 'Matebele' which may have no relation with the descendants of then Bahurutshe King Motebele, who are also referred to as 'Matebele'). Research is ongoing.

Most people practise Christianity or traditional African cultural religion
