= Uitkyk, North West =

Uitkyk
- Location within North West (South African province) Location within South Africa
- Coordinates: 25.208°S 26.428°E
- Country: South Africa
- Province: North West
- District: Bojanala Platinum
- Municipality: Moses Kotane

Area
  - Total: 7.28 km^{2} (2.81 sq mi)

Population (2011)
  - Total: 3,299
  - Density: 453/km^{2} (1,170/sq mi)

Racial makeup (2011)
  - Black African: 99.5%
  - Coloured: 0.3%
  - Indian/Asian: 0.1%
  - White: 0.1%

First languages (2011)
  - Tswana: 86.9%
  - Sotho: 4.0%
  - Xhosa: 2.9%
  - Zulu: 2.4%
  - Other: 3.8%
- Time zone: UTC+2 (SAST)
- PO box: 2843
- Area code: 014

Uitkyk is a town in Bojanala District Municipality in the North West province of South Africa.
