= Kraalhoek =

- Location within North West (South African province) Location within South Africa
- Coordinates: 24.918°S 27.074°E
- Country: South Africa
- Province: North West
- District: Bojanala Platinum
- Municipality: Moses Kotane

Area
  - Total: 2.26 km^{2} (0.87 sq mi)

Population (2011)
  - Total: 1,553
  - Density: 687/km^{2} (1,780/sq mi)

Racial makeup (2011)
  - Black African: 100.0%

First languages (2011)
  - Tswana: 86.1%
  - English: 5.7%
  - Tsonga: 2.3%
  - Northern Sotho: 1.7%
  - Other: 4.2%
- Time zone: UTC+2 (SAST)
- Postal code (street): 0341
- PO box: 0341

Kraalhoek is a town in Bojanala District Municipality in the North West province of South Africa.
