= Mabeskraal =

Mabeskraal Tlhakong Motsitle
- Location within North West (South African province) Location within South Africa
- Coordinates: 25.196°S 26.803°E
- Country: South Africa
- Province: North West
- District: Bojanala Platinum
- Municipality: Moses Kotane

Government
  - Councillor: Mrs Nketu Nkotswe for Ward 23 and Mrs Abish Magodielo for Ward 24. (African National Congress)

Area
  - Total: 20.10 km^{2} (7.76 sq mi)

Population (2011)
  - Total: 9,282
  - Density: 461.8/km^{2} (1,196/sq mi)

Racial makeup (2011)
  - Black African: 99.5%
  - Indian/Asian: 0.3%
  - White: 0.1%
  - Other: 0.1%

First languages (2011)
  - Tswana: 92.9%
  - English: 2.1%
  - Zulu: 1.1%
  - Other: 3.9%
- Time zone: UTC+2 (SAST)
- Postal code (street): 0313
- PO box: 0313
- Area code: 014

Mabeskraal is a town in Bojanala District Municipality in the North West province of South Africa.

Mabeskraal is approximately 72 km from the city of Rustenburg and near to the Pilanesberg and Sun City area.
