= Kgetlengrivier Local Municipality elections =

Local elections in the North West Province, South Africa

The Kgetlengrivier Local Municipality council consists of thirteen members elected by mixed-member proportional representation. Seven councillors are elected by first-past-the-post voting in seven wards, while the remaining six are chosen from party lists so that the total number of party representatives is proportional to the number of votes received.

In the election of 4 November 2026 the African National Congress (ANC) lost its majority, but remains the largest party.

== Results ==
The following table shows the composition of the council after past elections.

Event	ANC	DA	EFF	FF+	Other	Total
2000 election	7	3	—	—	0	10
2006 election	8	2	—	0	0	10
2011 election	9	3	—	0	0	12
2016 election	8	3	3	1	0	15
2021 election	7	1	2	2	1	13
2026 election	6	1	1	2	3	13

== December 2000 election ==
The following table shows the results of the 2000 election.

Party	Ward			List			Total seats
Party	Votes	%	Seats	Votes	%	Seats	Total seats
African National Congress	4,372	63.38	5	4,849	72.04	2	7
Democratic Alliance	1,491	21.61	0	1,578	23.44	3	3
Independent candidates	874	12.67	0				0
United Christian Democratic Party	161	2.33	0	304	4.52	0	0
Total	6,898	100.00	5	6,731	100.00	5	10
Valid votes	6,898	97.39		6,731	96.70		
Invalid/blank votes	185	2.61		230	3.30		
Total votes	7,083	100.00		6,961	100.00		
Registered voters/turnout	15,224	46.53		15,224	45.72		

== March 2006 election ==
The following table shows the results of the 2006 election.

Party	Ward			List			Total seats
Party	Votes	%	Seats	Votes	%	Seats	Total seats
African National Congress	6,872	72.67	5	7,056	75.59	3	8
Democratic Alliance	1,580	16.71	0	1,620	17.35	2	2
Freedom Front Plus	346	3.66	0	363	3.89	0	0
Independent candidates	358	3.79	0				0
Pan Africanist Congress of Azania	176	1.86	0	160	1.71	0	0
African Christian Democratic Party	125	1.32	0	136	1.46	0	0
Total	9,457	100.00	5	9,335	100.00	5	10
Valid votes	9,457	96.57		9,335	95.34		
Invalid/blank votes	336	3.43		456	4.66		
Total votes	9,793	100.00		9,791	100.00		
Registered voters/turnout	18,756	52.21		18,756	52.20		

== May 2011 election ==
The following table shows the results of the 2011 election.

Party	Ward			List			Total seats
Party	Votes	%	Seats	Votes	%	Seats	Total seats
African National Congress	8,308	74.58	4	8,385	75.19	5	9
Democratic Alliance	2,297	20.62	2	2,271	20.36	1	3
Congress of the People	280	2.51	0	250	2.24	0	0
Freedom Front Plus	176	1.58	0	166	1.49	0	0
African People's Convention	18	0.16	0	80	0.72	0	0
Independent candidates	60	0.54	0				0
Total	11,139	100.00	6	11,152	100.00	6	12
Valid votes	11,139	97.74		11,152	97.93		
Invalid/blank votes	258	2.26		236	2.07		
Total votes	11,397	100.00		11,388	100.00		
Registered voters/turnout	19,682	57.91		19,682	57.86		

== August 2016 election ==
The following table shows the results of the 2016 election.

Party	Ward			List			Total seats
Party	Votes	%	Seats	Votes	%	Seats	Total seats
African National Congress	7,161	55.84	7	7,150	55.76	1	8
Economic Freedom Fighters	2,325	18.13	0	2,343	18.27	3	3
Democratic Alliance	2,218	17.30	1	2,205	17.20	2	3
Freedom Front Plus	865	6.75	0	869	6.78	1	1
Congress of the People	174	1.36	0	143	1.12	0	0
African People's Convention	80	0.62	0	112	0.87	0	0
Total	12,823	100.00	8	12,822	100.00	7	15
Valid votes	12,823	96.97		12,822	97.02		
Invalid/blank votes	400	3.03		394	2.98		
Total votes	13,223	100.00		13,216	100.00		
Registered voters/turnout	22,007	60.09		22,007	60.05		

== November 2021 election ==
The following table shows the results of the 2021 election.

Party	Ward			List			Total seats
Party	Votes	%	Seats	Votes	%	Seats	Total seats
African National Congress	5,677	53.87	6	5,943	58.41	1	7
Freedom Front Plus	1,043	9.90	0	1,361	13.38	2	2
Economic Freedom Fighters	1,084	10.29	0	1,267	12.45	2	2
Independent candidates	1,951	18.51	1				1
Democratic Alliance	672	6.38	0	935	9.19	1	1
Forum for Service Delivery	43	0.41	0	381	3.74	0	0
Tsogang Civic Movement	28	0.27	0	84	0.83	0	0
Congress of the People	26	0.25	0	84	0.83	0	0
African Transformation Movement	7	0.07	0	64	0.63	0	0
Abantu Batho Congress	7	0.07	0	55	0.54	0	0
Total	10,538	100.00	7	10,174	100.00	6	13
Valid votes	10,538	97.89		10,174	94.77		
Invalid/blank votes	227	2.11		561	5.23		
Total votes	10,765	100.00		10,735	100.00		
Registered voters/turnout	21,952	49.04		21,952	48.90		

== November 2026 election ==
The following table shows the results of the 2026 election.

Party	Ward			List			Total seats
Party	Votes	%	Seats	Votes	%	Seats	Total seats
African National Congress	5,408	43.28	6	5,432	43.41	0	6
South African Communist Party	1,988	15.91	1	1,930	15.43	1	2
Freedom Front Plus	1,805	14.45	0	1,783	14.25	2	2
Democratic Alliance	1,019	8.16	0	1,031	8.24	1	1
Economic Freedom Fighters	725	5.80	0	758	6.06	1	1
ActionSA	539	4.31	0	545	4.36	1	1
Kgetleng People's Forum	356	2.85	0	381	3.05	0	0
uMkhonto weSizwe Party	312	2.50	0	297	2.37	0	0
Labour Party	173	1.38	0	172	1.37	0	0
All Citizens Party	85	0.68	0	81	0.65	0	0
African Spear Movement	25	0.20	0	46	0.37	0	0
Afrika Mayibuye Movement	25	0.20	0	28	0.22	0	0
Organic Humanity Movement	17	0.14	0	9	0.07	0	0
Patriotic Alliance	10	0.08	0	8	0.06	0	0
Purple Party Ikageng	4	0.03	0	6	0.05	0	0
Seriti Le Kaelo Independent Party	3	0.02	0	5	0.04	0	0
Total	12,494	100.00	7	12,512	100.00	6	13
Valid votes	12,494	96.90		12,512	97.07		
Invalid/blank votes	400	3.10		378	2.93		
Total votes	12,894	100.00		12,890	100.00		
Registered voters/turnout	25,075	51.42		25,075	51.41		
