= Goedehoop =

- Location within North West (South African province) Location within South Africa
- Coordinates: 24.879°S 26.644°E
- Country: South Africa
- Province: North West
- District: Bojanala Platinum
- Municipality: Moses Kotane

Area
  - Total: 0.50 km^{2} (0.19 sq mi)

Population (2011)
  - Total: 331
  - Density: 660/km^{2} (1,700/sq mi)

Racial makeup (2011)
  - Black African: 100.0%

First languages (2011)
  - Tswana: 79.8%
  - Xhosa: 11.2%
  - Tsonga: 2.7%
  - English: 2.4%
  - Other: 3.9%
- Time zone: UTC+2 (SAST)
- Postal code (street): 7140

Goedehoop (Afrikaans for good hope) is a settlement in Bojanala District Municipality in the North West province of South Africa.
