= Mogogelo =

- Location within North West (South African province) Location within South Africa
- Coordinates: 25.354°S 28.138°E
- Country: South Africa
- Province: North West
- District: Bojanala Platinum
- Municipality: Moretele

Area
  - Total: 4.64 km^{2} (1.79 sq mi)

Population (2011)
  - Total: 11,425
  - Density: 2,460/km^{2} (6,380/sq mi)

Racial makeup (2011)
  - Black African: 99.3%
  - Coloured: 0.1%
  - Indian/Asian: 0.1%
  - White: 0.5%
  - Other: 0.1%

First languages (2011)
  - Tsonga: 35.5%
  - Tswana: 30.1%
  - Northern Sotho: 15.1%
  - S. Ndebele: 7.5%
  - Other: 11.9%
- Time zone: UTC+2 (SAST)
- Postal code (street): n/a
- PO box: 0422
- Area code: 014

Mogogelo is a town in Moretele Local Municipality in the North West province of South Africa.
