= Moretele =

- Location within North West (South African province) Location within South Africa
- Coordinates: 25.145°S 27.961°E
- Country: South Africa
- Province: North West
- District: Bojanala Platinum
- Municipality: Moretele

Area
  - Total: 4.95 km^{2} (1.91 sq mi)

Population (2011)
  - Total: 4,050
  - Density: 818/km^{2} (2,120/sq mi)

Racial makeup (2011)
  - Black African: 99.9%
  - Indian/Asian: 0.1%

First languages (2011)
  - Tswana: 76.6%
  - Northern Sotho: 10.0%
  - Tsonga: 7.2%
  - Zulu: 1.7%
  - Other: 4.5%
- Time zone: UTC+2 (SAST)

Moretele is a town in Bojanala District Municipality in the North West province of South Africa.

== Notable people ==
- Zipporah Nawal member of parliament
- Prof Rita Maidi Raseleka (nee Mfolo)
- Gab Moitsiwa
- Dr George Shilaluke
- Thabo Monareng
- Thabo Moitsiwa
- Vincent Metlholo Mothabela
- Ikaneng Malebye
