= Damonsville =

- Location within North West (South African province) Location within South Africa
- Coordinates: 25.624°S 27.849°E
- Country: South Africa
- Province: North West
- District: Bojanala Platinum
- Municipality: Madibeng

Area
  - Total: 1.91 km^{2} (0.74 sq mi)

Population (2011)
  - Total: 3,969
  - Density: 2,080/km^{2} (5,380/sq mi)

Racial makeup (2011)
  - Black African: 70.9%
  - Coloured: 24.8%
  - Indian/Asian: 0.4%
  - White: 0.1%
  - Other: 3.8%

First languages (2011)
  - Tswana: 39.8%
  - Afrikaans: 27.4%
  - Tsonga: 6.2%
  - Northern Sotho: 4.8%
  - Other: 21.7%
- Time zone: UTC+2 (SAST)

Damonsville is a town in Bojanala District Municipality in the North West province of South Africa. It may be seen as a multiracial suburb of the town Brits.
