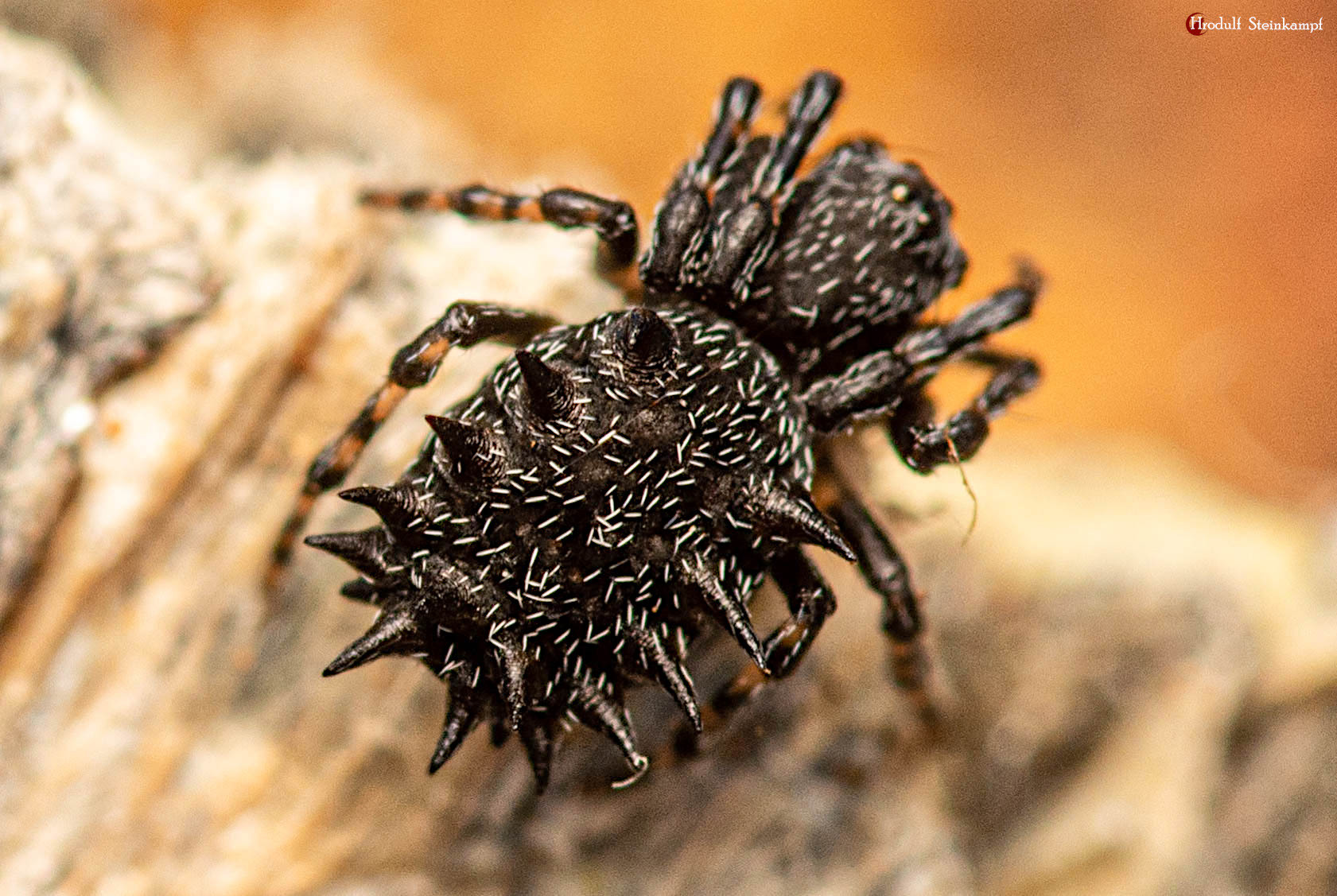

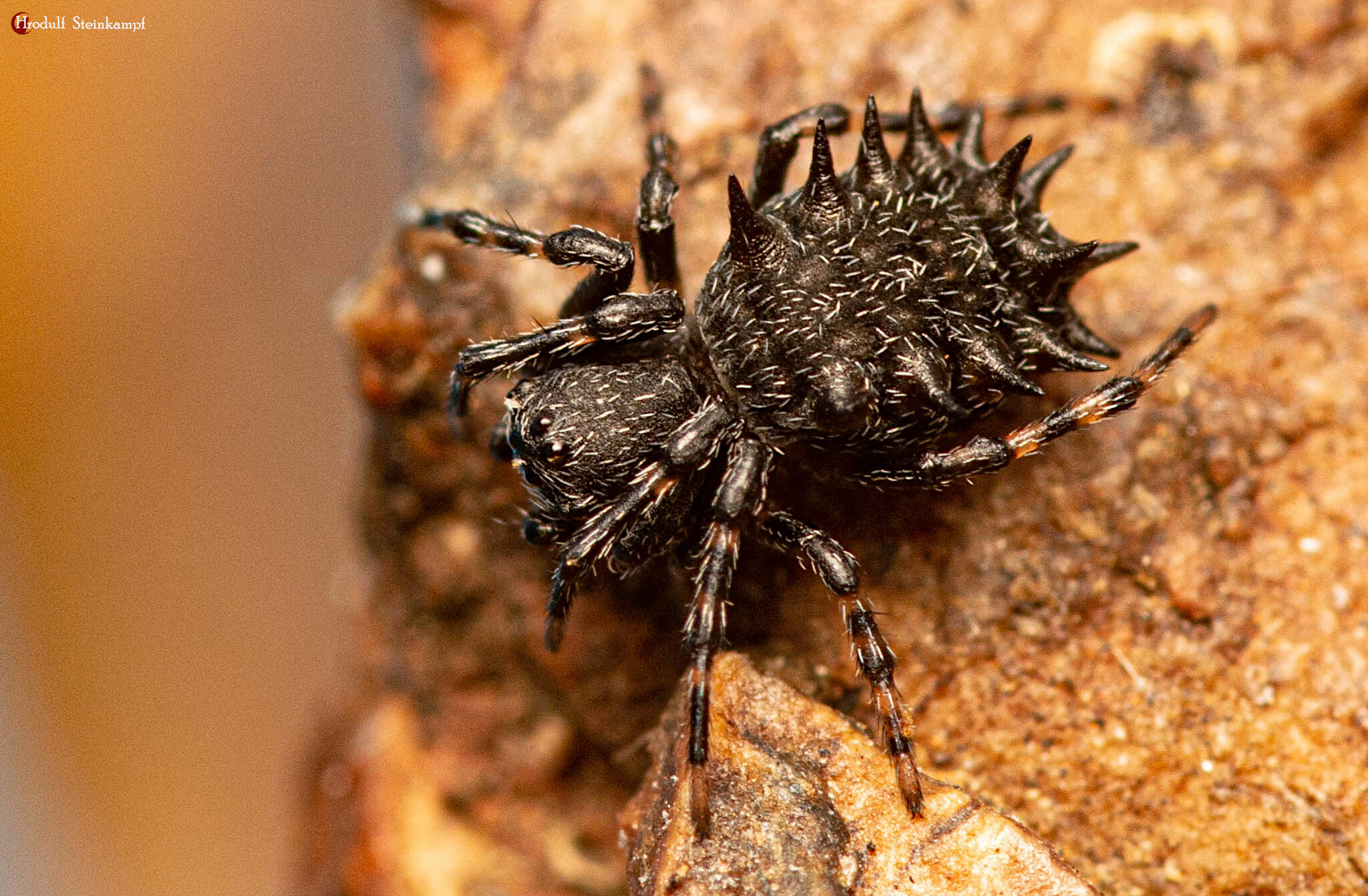

Scientific classification
- Kingdom: Animalia
- Phylum: Arthropoda
- Subphylum: Chelicerata
- Class: Arachnida
- Order: Araneae
- Infraorder: Araneomorphae
- Family: Araneidae
- Genus: Araneus
- Species: A. tatianae

Binomial name
- Araneus tatianae Lessert, 1938

= Araneus tatianae =

Araneus Orb-Web Spider

Species of spider

Araneus tatianae is a species of spider in the family Araneidae. It occurs in Congo and South Africa.

== Distribution ==
Araneus tatianae was originally described from Ituri, Okondo in the Democratic Republic of the Congo. The species has also been photographed in South Africa in Gauteng at Hammanskraal.

== Habitat and ecology ==
The species has been photographed on small plants.

== Description ==
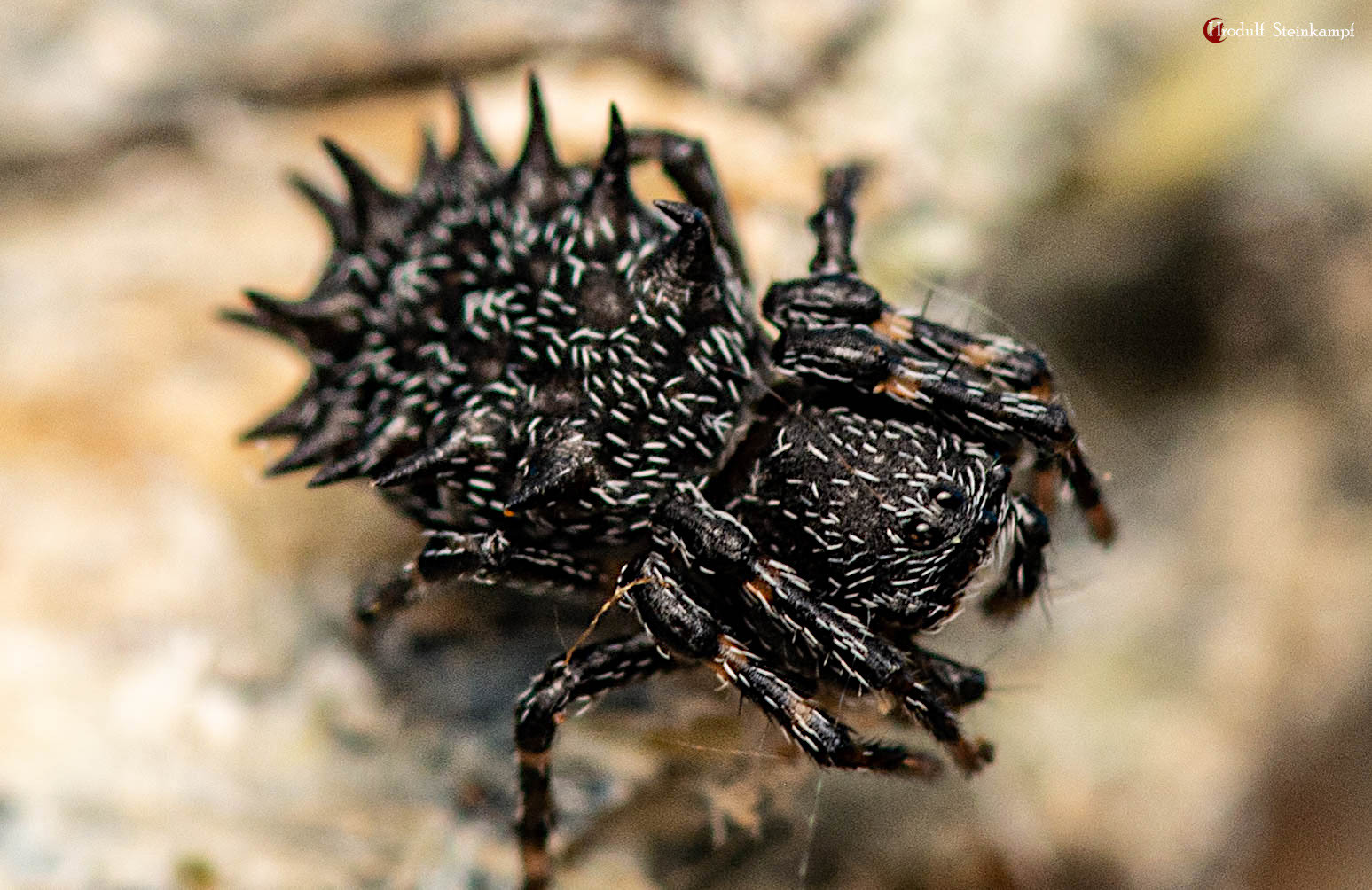

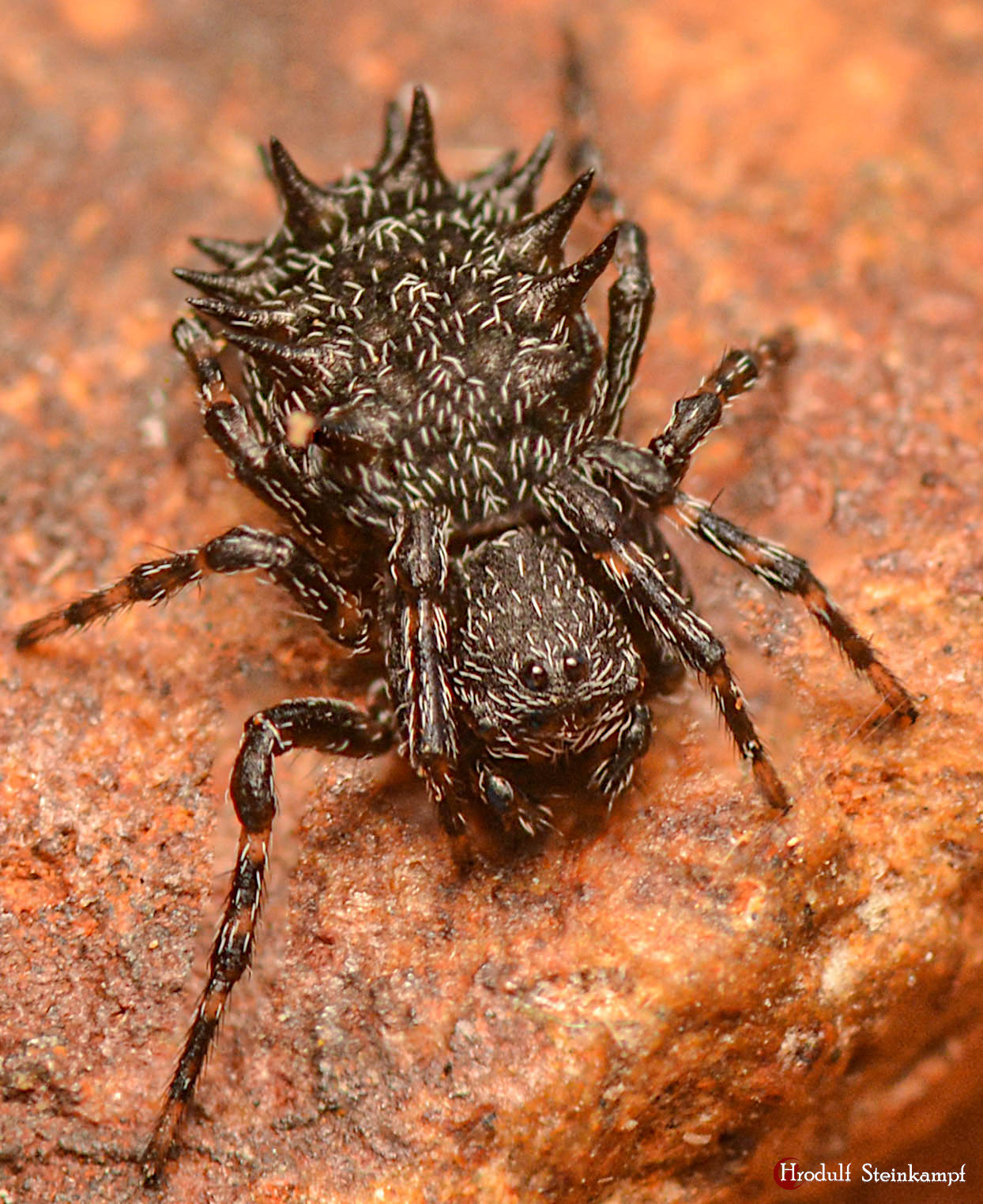

== Conservation ==
Araneus tatianae is listed as Data Deficient.

== Taxonomy ==
The species was originally described by Roger de Lessert in 1938 from the Democratic Republic of the Congo. Lessert indicated that he was not sure whether the species belongs to Araneus. The species is known only from the female.
