= Mathibestad =

- Location within North West (South African province) Location within South Africa
- Coordinates: 25.276°S 28.178°E
- Country: South Africa
- Province: North West
- District: Bojanala Platinum
- Municipality: Moretele

Area
  - Total: 24.02 km^{2} (9.27 sq mi)

Population (2011)
  - Total: 25,945
  - Density: 1,080/km^{2} (2,798/sq mi)

Racial makeup (2011)
  - Black African: 99.7%
  - Indian/Asian: 0.1%
  - Other: 0.1%

First languages (2011)
  - Tswana: 51.7%
  - Tsonga: 18.8%
  - Northern Sotho: 14.7%
  - Sotho: 3.3%
  - Other: 11.4%
- Time zone: UTC+2 (SAST)
- PO box: 0418

Mathibestad is a town in Bojanala District Municipality in the North West province of South Africa.
