= Sonop =

- Location within North West (South African province) Location within South Africa
- Coordinates: 25.648°S 27.698°E
- Country: South Africa
- Province: North West
- District: Bojanala
- Municipality: Madibeng

Area
  - Total: 3.39 km^{2} (1.31 sq mi)

Population (2011)
  - Total: 4,659
  - Density: 1,370/km^{2} (3,560/sq mi)

Racial makeup (2011)
  - Black African: 80.4%
  - Coloured: 0.6%
  - Indian/Asian: 0.1%
  - White: 18.8%
  - Other: 0.1%

First languages (2011)
  - Tswana: 38.2%
  - Afrikaans: 18.3%
  - Tsonga: 16.0%
  - Northern Sotho: 10.1%
  - Other: 17.5%
- Time zone: UTC+2 (SAST)
- PO box: 0258

Sonop is a town in Bojanala District Municipality in the North West province of South Africa.
