= Makapanstad =

- Location within North West (South African province) Location within South Africa
- Coordinates: 25.239°S 28.116°E
- Country: South Africa
- Province: North West
- District: Bojanala Platinum
- Municipality: Moretele

Area
  - Total: 20.45 km^{2} (7.90 sq mi)

Population (2011)
  - Total: 15,076
  - Density: 737.2/km^{2} (1,909/sq mi)

Racial makeup (2011)
  - Black African: 99.5%
  - Indian/Asian: 0.2%
  - White: 0.2%
  - Other: 0.1%

First languages (2011)
  - Tswana: 82.6%
  - Northern Sotho: 5.4%
  - Tsonga: 4.7%
  - English: 1.5%
  - Other: 5.8%
- Time zone: UTC+2 (SAST)
- Postal code (street): 0404
- PO box: 0404
- Area code: 012

Makapanstad is a village and the seat of the Moretele Local Municipality, falling under Bojanala Platinum District Municipality in the North West province of South Africa.

Makapanstad is under the leadership of the Makapan royal family. They are the Bakgatla Ba Mosetlha and their totem animal is the Kgabo (English: their spirit animal is the monkey). The most recent Chief of Makapanstad was Kgosi Motshegwa Hendrick. He died on 26 December 2014.
