= Bethanie, North West =

Bethanie
- Location within North West (South African province) Location within South Africa
- Coordinates: 25.554°S 27.606°E
- Country: South Africa
- Province: North West
- District: Bojanala
- Municipality: Rustenburg

Government
  - Paramount Chief: Mamogale

Area
  - Total: 27.87 km^{2} (10.76 sq mi)

Population (2011)
  - Total: 8,429
  - Density: 302.4/km^{2} (783.3/sq mi)

Racial makeup (2011)
  - Black African: 99.1%
  - Coloured: 0.1%
  - Indian/Asian: 0.4%
  - White: 0.1%
  - Other: 0.3%

First languages (2011)
  - Tswana: 79.2%
  - Zulu: 5.2%
  - English: 4.8%
  - Tsonga: 2.1%
  - Other: 8.7%
- Time zone: UTC+2 (SAST)
- Postal code (street): 0260
- PO box: 0270
- Area code: 012

Bethanie is a town in Bojanala District Municipality in the North West province of South Africa.

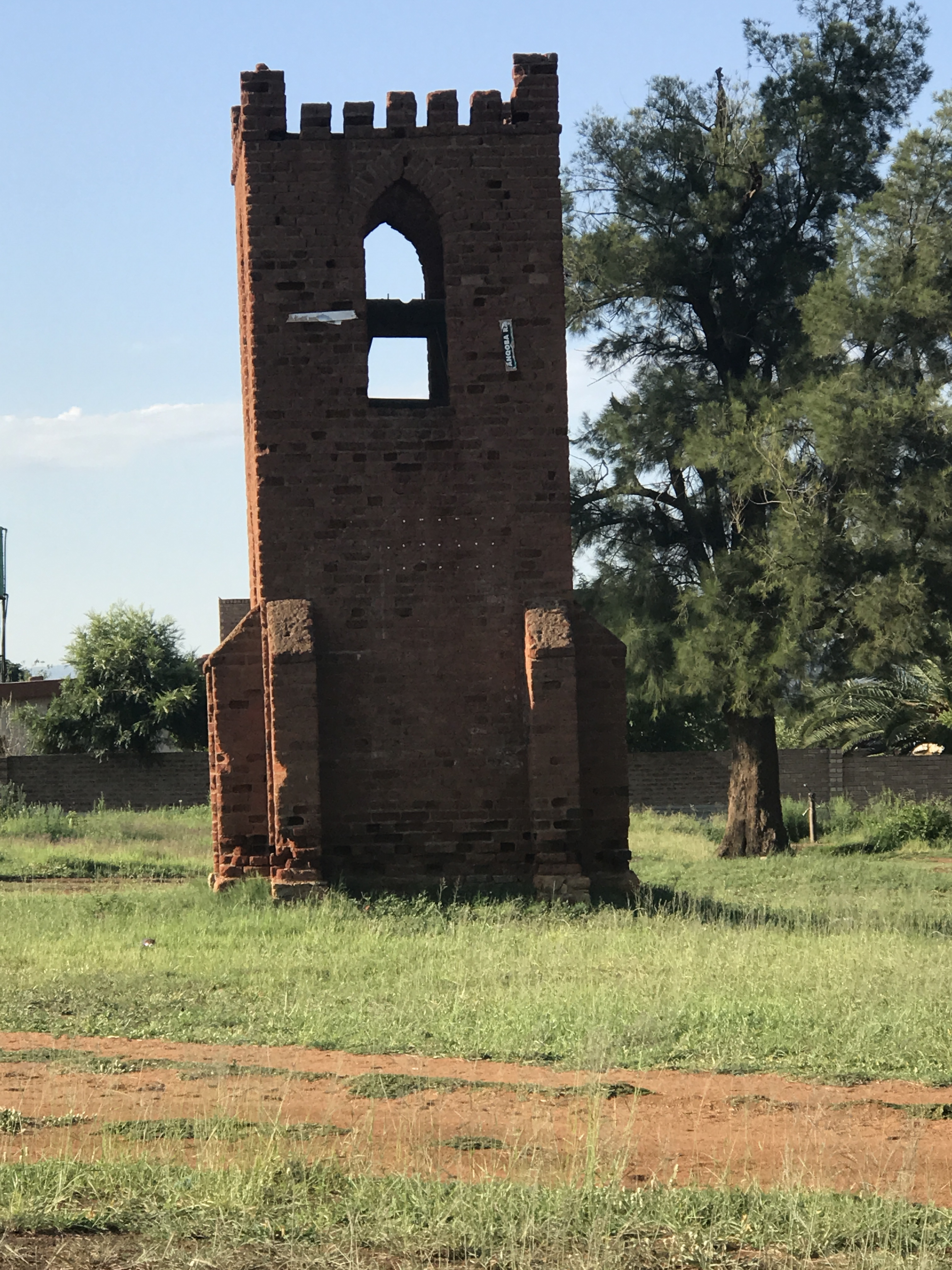
The Bell tower in Bethanie is one of the oldest structures in the village. It was constructed in the late 1800s as part of the Mission.

Bethanie is a station of the Hermannsburg Mission, established in 1864, and located 37 km northeast of Rustenburg. The name is of biblical origin (Matthew 26:6, Mark 14:3 Mark 11:1), and is Hebrew for 'house of sorrow or misery'.

Bethanie is the capital town of Bakwena Ba Mogopa, a SeTswana-speaking traditional community.

== History ==
It is one of 15 villages that form part of Bakwena Ba Mogopa nation. The village was previously a farm called Losperfontein, owned by Tjaart Kruger, President Paul Kruger's younger brother. The community purchased the farm around 1866, with the assistance of missionary Wilhelm Behrenssen, and it was renamed Bethanie.

== Sports ==
Lerumo Lions are based in Bethanie.

== Facilities ==
Bethanie has a police station that renders services to nearby settlements such as Modikoe and Berseba.

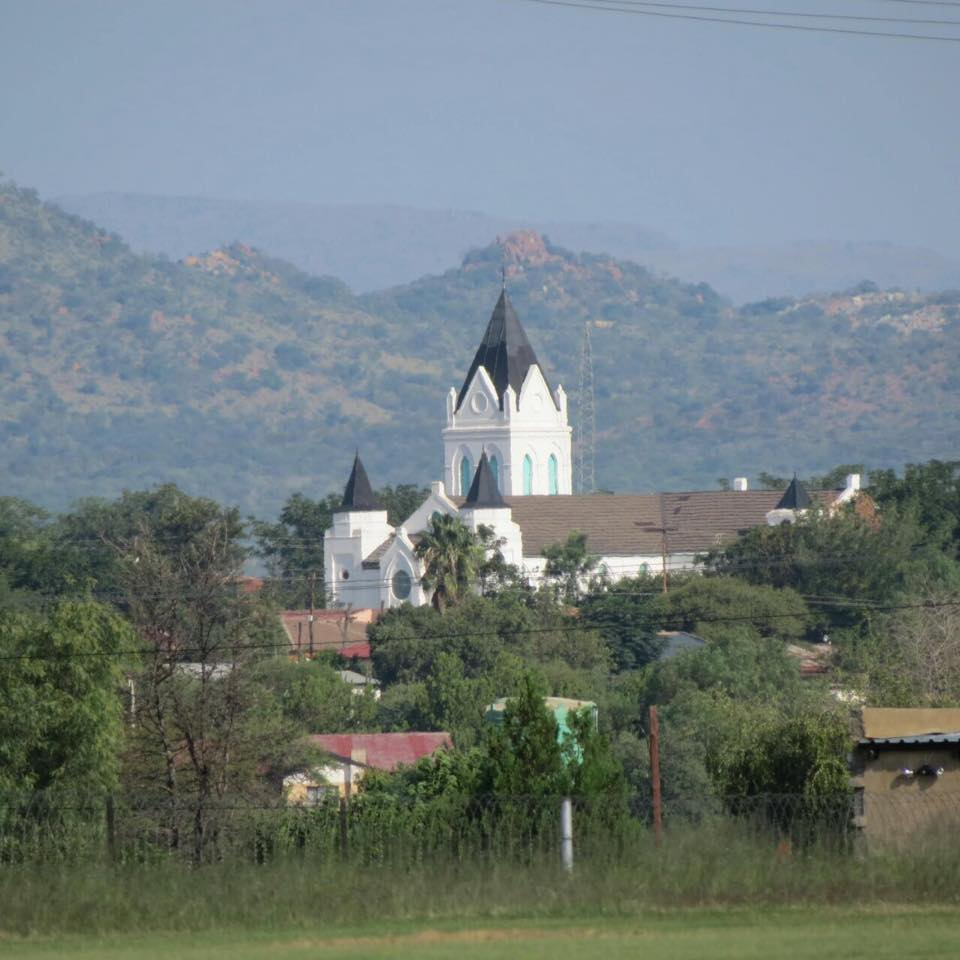
A view of Bethanie, with the iconic Lutheran Church a centerpiece.
