= Mogwase =

Town in North West province, South Africa

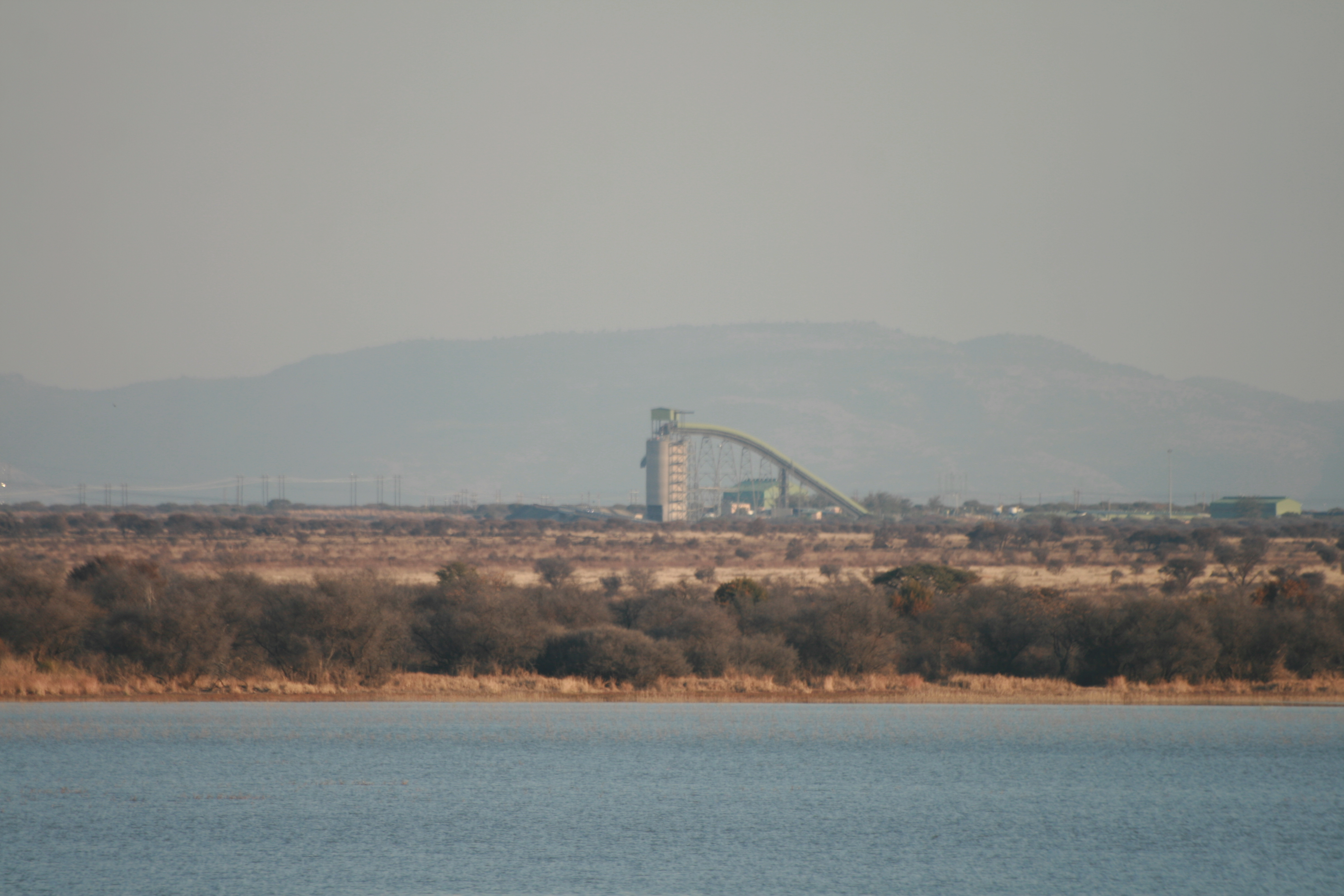
- A mine at Mogwase

- Location within North West (South African province) Location within South Africa
- Coordinates: 25.276°S 27.216°E
- Country: South Africa
- Province: North West
- District: Bojanala
- Municipality: Moses Kotane

Area
  - Total: 19.51 km^{2} (7.53 sq mi)

Population (2011)
  - Total: 10,743
  - Density: 550.6/km^{2} (1,426/sq mi)

Racial makeup (2011)
  - Black African: 93.7%
  - Coloured: 0.7%
  - Indian/Asian: 4.8%
  - White: 0.6%
  - Other: 0.1%

First languages (2011)
  - Tswana: 67.4%
  - English: 8.4%
  - Zulu: 3.4%
  - Sotho: 3.2%
  - Other: 17.5%
- Time zone: UTC+2 (SAST)
- Postal code (street): 0314
- PO box: 0314
- Area code: 014

Mogwase is a town in Bojanala Platinum District Municipality in the North West province of South Africa.

Mogwase is close to Sun City and the Pilanesberg National Park, two of the major tourist attractions in the North West province, though the town itself has no significant attractions. Owing to the growth of the platinum industry, Mogwase is a fast-developing town.

== Notable residents ==
- Lara Kruger (1987–2018), Motsweding FM radio personality and transgender rights activist

== See also ==
- Mogwase Stadium
