= Lara Kruger =

South African radio personality and transgender rights activist

- Born: Thapelo Lehulere; 3 February 1987; Mogwase, Transvaal Province, South Africa
- Died: 3 January 2018 (aged 30); Ledig, North West Province, South Africa
- Other name: Miss Lara Kruger
- Occupations: Radio presenter Transgender rights activist
- Years active: 2016–2018
- Known for: Being one of the first openly transgender radio presenters in South Africa

Thapelo Lehulere (3 February 1987 – 3 January 2018), known professionally as Lara Kruger, was a South African radio personality and transgender rights activist. She was one of the first openly transgender radio presenters on a mainstream South African radio station, Motsweding FM.

== Early life and career ==
Kruger was born on 3 February 1987 in Mogwase outside Rustenburg in the present-day North West Province of South Africa. Her father died when she was two years old and she was raised by her mother. She had two sisters.

Kruger identified as a girl from a very young age and would queue with girls at school despite teachers' objections. While studying cosmetology at a college in Pretoria, she embraced her feminine identity.

== Career ==
Kruger worked in the hospitality and beauty industry before becoming a radio presenter. She worked in different roles, including as a spa therapist, manager and consultant. She also founded her beauty range Endless by Miss Lara.

Kruger gained an online following by reviewing television programmes on different social media platforms, which led to Setswana language radio station, Motsweding FM, scouting her in 2016. She initially worked with radio DJ Tazzman Matasatasa as a co-host before hosting her own show, Di direga kae or Weekend Good Times Show, which aired between 9pm and 12am on Saturdays. Kruger was one of the first openly transgender radio presenters on a mainstream South African radio station. She was described as being a popular radio DJ by The Sowetan and as "one of the most-loved radio presenters in Mzansi" by DRUM.

== Public identity ==
Although Kruger identified as female and used she/her pronouns, her identity document still classified her as male. Kruger said in an interview with The Sowetan in July 2017: "I identify as a woman from a social level. I live my life like a woman on a day-to-day basis. But in terms of my ID, my driver’s licence and matric certificate and all those documentations of life, unfortunately they do still say male because the process [of gender transformation] in our country is not as easy as one may think it is."

On gender-affirming surgery, Kruger said in an interview with DRUM in September 2017 that being transgender is "mainly about how you feel inside." She further elaborated that "I really don't see the necessity of changing your private parts if you are transgender. Sex reassignment surgeries are very expensive. I wouldn't do that to myself. I've accepted that God gave me this male body and the only thing I'll do is to take care of it."

== Personal life and death ==
Kruger experienced depression and was hopitalised twice in a week in December 2017, shortly before her death.

Kruger died on 3 January 2018 in the Moses Kotane Hospital in Ledig outside Rustenburg after a short illness. Her family was by her side when she died. Various celebrities, including Somizi Mhlongo, paid tribute to her. Her memorial service was held on 11 January 2018 and her funeral in Mogwase on 13 January.
