= Zipporah Nawa =

South African teacher and politician

Zipporah Noisey Nawa (1 March 1945 – 5 November 2007) was a South African teacher, politician and Member of Parliament.

== Life ==
Zipporah Nawa was born on 1 March 1945 in the rural village of Walmansthal in Pretoria. She received her teaching training education at Emmarentia Teachers College in Bela-Bela, Limpopo Province. She taught for a while in Hammanskraal and Pankop (Masube) areas until she left for Louis Trichardt (Makhado) to teach at a local school. In between teaching, she became active in the liberation struggle in the area, carrying out ANC underground work.

On her return home to Hammanskraal, she found that the area had become part of the newly established Bophuthatswana government that did not allow multi-party democratic participation in parliament and civic life. As a result, she was forced to join the Bophuthatswana Teachers Union, but secretly continued to carry on with her ANC underground operations with the likes of the local second-hand furniture shop dealer Mr Deboy Mokoena. Together, they established underground uMkhonto we Sizwe (MK) cells around Hammanskraal. Among some of the people they recruited into the cells were Mokoena's son, Dithupe, otherwise known by his nom de guerre as Stix after he had skipped the country. There was also Monageng Patrick Xoliso Mmakou who later died on 4 June 1980 in Swaziland in a bomb blast orchestrated by the South African security forces. Mr Mokoena recruited and handled Mr Patrick Bapela, a.k.a. Raymond Mogale, who was incidentally related to Zipporah Nawa. Bapela recruited her eldest son, Lebogang Lance, into MK activities. These included reconnaissance work around the forest that separated Marokolong village and the White suburb called Renstown. In the forest were bunkers which were used as hideout by the Stinkwater-based Benjamin Moloise and the "Moroka Three" combatants (Simon Mogoerane, Jerry Mosololi and Marcus Motaung) for their mission to attack the Hammanskraal-based South African Police Training College. Arms, ammunition and political literature were hidden here for local MK operatives to courier to various destinations. Crash courses in handling and discharging of weapons and explosives for the local recruits were also conducted inside the bunkers. Zipporah later relocated her son to Eersterust near Mamelodi to avoid harassment from the Bophuthatswana police. But he continued with his political activities there.

Zipporah clandestinely took part in various community activities, including the anti-Bophuthatswana campaign between 1980 and 1990 when eventually led to its collapse. After the collapse of the Bophuthatswana government, which allowed for free political activities, Zipporah joined the South African Democratic Teachers Union (SADTU) and became a branch executive committee member, as well as joining other civic structures in the North West province. When the African National Congress was unbanned together with other anti-apartheid organisation in 1990, Nawa became involved in structures of the organisation, including those of the ANC Women's League in the North West province. She held a number of positions within both the ANC and the ANCWL, including those of secretary, deputy secretary and ex officio of various branches of the ANCWL. Nawa also served as an executive committee member of the ANCWL Eastern Region and as a member of the Gender Commission in the North West.

She also rose in her teaching profession. She became a school principal at Lefofa Primary School from 1993 and held to the position for 13 years before she resigned to become a Member of Parliament (MP) in July 2006, where she served in the portfolio committee on Correctional Services and her constituency of Moretele. She was also a, fine artist, mathematician and excellent cook. Her colleague, the late Dr Molefi Paul Sefularo used to describe her as a "beaut" and "lover of fine cloth" (good dresser).

Zipporah Nawa died in 2007 and was buried at Marokolong cemeteries. At the time of her death, she had just completed building a house within the Royal Kraal of the Baphuting-Ba-Ga-Nawa in Lebotloane village in Moretele, North West Province. She left behind two sons and a daughter.
