= Mogwase Stadium =

Football stadium in Mogwase, South Africa

- Interactive map of Mogwase Stadium
- Location: Mogwase, South Africa
- Coordinates: 25.266592°S 27.234335°E

Mogwase Stadium is a football stadium in Mogwase, near Rustenburg in the North West Province, South Africa.

It was used by the United States national football team and the South African team as a training base during the 2009 FIFA Confederations Cup.
