= Boschfontein =

Boschfontein Townland
- Location within Mpumalanga Location within South Africa
- Coordinates: 25.744°S 31.626°E
- Country: South Africa
- Province: Mpumalanga
- District: Ehlanzeni
- Municipality: Nkomazi

Area
  - Total: 6.09 km^{2} (2.35 sq mi)

Population (2011)
  - Total: 7,811
  - Density: 1,280/km^{2} (3,320/sq mi)

Racial makeup (2011)
  - Black African: 99.7%
  - Coloured: 0.1%
  - Indian/Asian: 0.2%

First languages (2011)
  - Swazi: 97.2%
  - Tsonga: 1.1%
  - Other: 1.6%
- Time zone: UTC+2 (SAST)

Boschfontein is a town in Ehlanzeni District Municipality in the Mpumalanga province of South Africa.
