= Fort Merensky =

- "Fort Wilhelm"
- Middelburg, South Africa
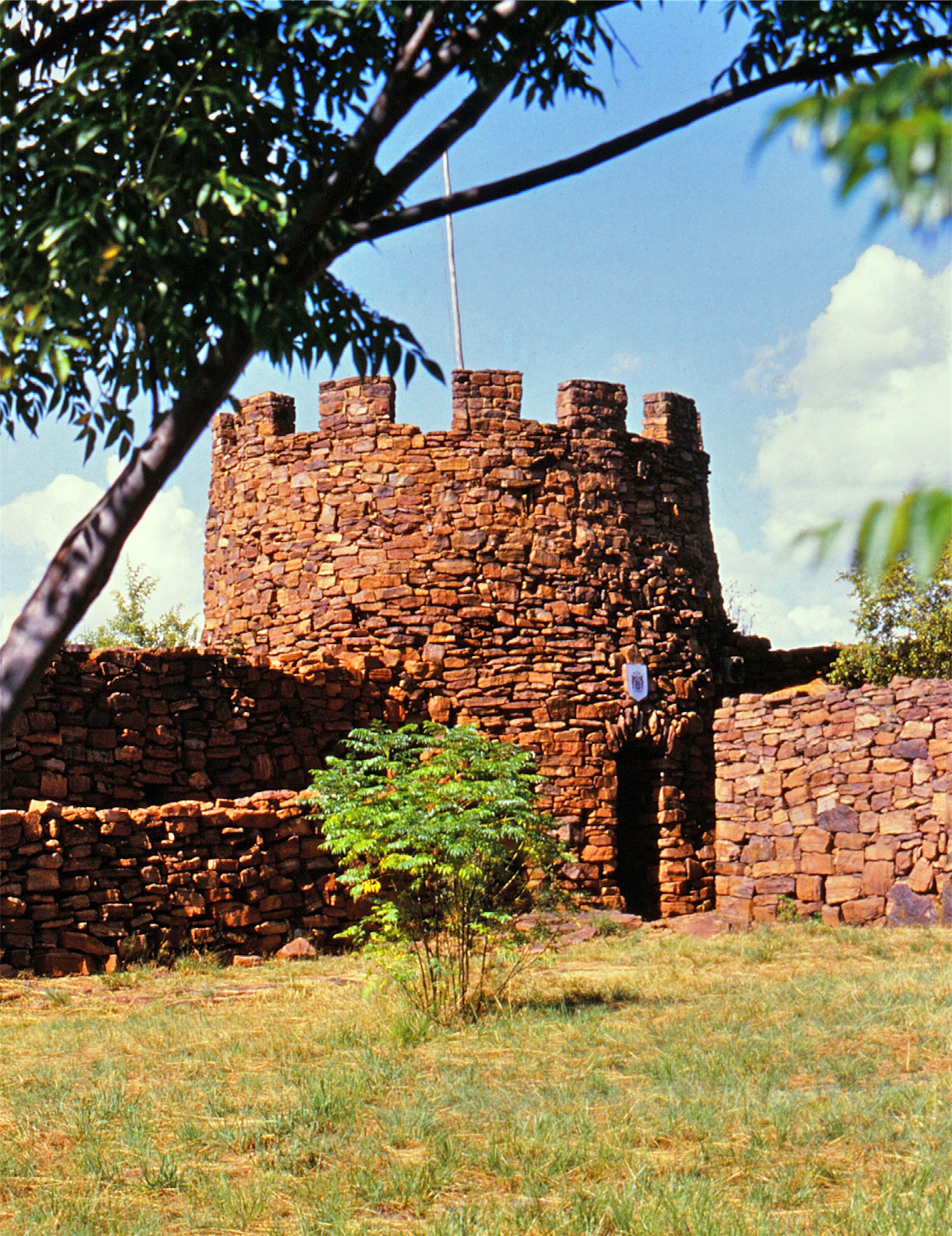
- The main wall and tower.

Site information
- Type: Medieval-style Castle, Dry Wall construction.
- Controlled by: South Africa
- Open to the public: Yes
- Condition: Intact

Location
- Coordinates: 25°41′51″S 29°24′39″E

Site history
- Built: 1865
- Materials: Local stone
- Events: Sekhukuni War, Mapoch War, First Boer War

Garrison information
- Garrison: Local converts of the Berlin Missionary Society

Fort Merensky, also called Fort Wilhelm, stands on a prominent hill in a commanding position near Botshabelo, a former Berlin Mission Station (BMS), 13 kilometers from Middelburg on the road to Groblersdal. It was built in order to protect the mission's convert from attacks by the local Bantu tribes using dry wall construction.

== History ==
In February 1865 in what was then the Transvaal Republic (ZAR). Merensky had fled with a small number of parishioners, following the attacks on his previous mission station, Ga-Ratau, by the soldiers of Sekhukhune, the king of the baPedi. Within a year of having established the mission station, the population had grown to 420 persons. In order to protect their new settlement Merensky had Fort Wilhelm built above the church and village and two further forts that protected the Moutse area were built. Botshabelo was the major spiritual, cultural and educational centre of the Berliner Mission Society in that part of the Zuid Afrikaansche Republiek (ZAR). It played a significant role during the Sekhukuni, the Mapoch, First Boer and the Second Boer Wars.

== See also ==
- List of Castles and Fortifications in South Africa
