= Magneetshoogte =

Magneetshoogte Makgane Magnet Heights
- Location within Limpopo Location within South Africa
- Coordinates: 24.792°S 29.966°E
- Country: South Africa
- Province: Limpopo
- District: Sekhukhune
- Municipality: Makhuduthamaga

Government
  - Councillor: Tabane Peter Rankoe (ANC)

Area
  - Total: 5.02 km^{2} (1.94 sq mi)

Population (2001)
  - Total: 3,364
  - Density: 670/km^{2} (1,740/sq mi)

Racial makeup (2001)
  - Black African: 99.96%
  - Indian/Asian: 0.04%

First languages (2001)
  - Northern Sotho: 98.22%
  - Swazi: 0.98%
  - Zulu: 0.45%
  - Other: 0.35%
- Time zone: UTC+2 (SAST)
- Area code: 013

Magneetshoogte is a town in Sekhukhune District Municipality in the Limpopo province of South Africa.
