= Kgetlengrivier Local Municipality =

Coordinates: 25°45′S 26°50′E

Kgetlengrivier
- Local municipality
- Seal

- Location in the North West
- Country: South Africa
- Province: North West
- District: Bojanala Platinum
- Seat: Koster
- Wards: 6

Government
  - Type: Municipal council
  - Mayor: Thabo Jacobs

Area
  - Total: 3,973 km^{2} (1,534 sq mi)

Population (2011)
  - Total: 51,049
  - Density: 12.85/km^{2} (33.28/sq mi)

Racial makeup (2011)
  - Black African: 80.1%
  - Coloured: 1.7%
  - Indian/Asian: 0.9%
  - White: 16.8%

First languages (2011)
  - Tswana: 69.2%
  - Afrikaans: 18.0%
  - English: 4.4%
  - Zulu: 1.5%
  - Other: 6.9%
- Time zone: UTC+2 (SAST)
- Municipal code: NW374

Kgetlengrivier Municipality (Tswana: Mmasepala wa Kgetlengrivier; Afrikaans: Kgetlengrivier Munisipaliteit) is a local municipality within the Bojanala Platinum District Municipality, in the North West province of South Africa.

== Main places ==
The 2001 census divided the municipality into the following main places:

Place	Code	Area (km^{2})	Population	Most spoken language
Borolelo	60401	0.80	4,826	Tswana
Derby	60402	1.93	1,703	Tswana
Koster	60404	5.90	2,141	Afrikaans
Nooitgedacht	60405	1.39	353	Tswana
Reagile	60406	1.55	8,441	Tswana
Swartruggens	60407	7.53	1,536	Afrikaans
Remainder of the municipality	60403	3,954.06	17,487	Tswana

== Languages ==
The 2011 census indicated the following prevalence of languages in this municipality: 67.1% Setswana; 17.4% Afrikaans; 4.2% English; 1.4% IsiZulu; 1.3% Sesotho; 1.0% IsiXhosa; 0.9% IsiNdebele ...

== Politics ==
The municipal council consists of thirteen members elected by mixed-member proportional representation. Seven councillors are elected by first-past-the-post voting in eight wards, while the remaining six are chosen from party lists so that the total number of party representatives is proportional to the number of votes received.

In the election of 4 November 2026 the African National Congress (ANC) lost its majority, but remains the largest party.

The following table shows the results of the election.

Party	Ward			List			Total seats
Party	Votes	%	Seats	Votes	%	Seats	Total seats
African National Congress	5,408	43.28	6	5,432	43.41	0	6
South African Communist Party	1,988	15.91	1	1,930	15.43	1	2
Freedom Front Plus	1,805	14.45	0	1,783	14.25	2	2
Democratic Alliance	1,019	8.16	0	1,031	8.24	1	1
Economic Freedom Fighters	725	5.80	0	758	6.06	1	1
ActionSA	539	4.31	0	545	4.36	1	1
10 other parties	1,010	8.08	0	1,033	8.26	0	0
Total	12,494	100.00	7	12,512	100.00	6	13
Valid votes	12,494	96.90		12,512	97.07		
Invalid/blank votes	400	3.10		378	2.93		
Total votes	12,894	100.00		12,890	100.00		
Registered voters/turnout	25,075	51.42		25,075	51.41		
