= Barokologadi Ba Ga Maotwa =

Barokologadi ba Ga Maotwe are a Tswana tribe who live in the North-West province of South Africa. They originally split from the 'Bapedi' Community and sought refuge among Bakgatla Ba Kgafela.

They lived at Lengwana Village, and they eventually re-settled at Mankgopi near Ramotswa in Botswana. On their departure from Mankgopi they settled at Melorane which is now the Madikwe Game Reserve in South Africa. In 1950 yet another exodus of Barologadi ba Ga Maotwe followed when they were forcefully removed from Melorane to Misgund, while others to De Brak.

In 1958 from Misgund they left for Pitsedisulejang which is now the main village of Barokologadi while other communities are settled at De Brak, Maretlwana, Sesobe, Nkaipaa, Ramotlhajwe Ramokgolela, Magong and Obakeng.

The Current Chief of the Barokolokgadi is Chief Kgosi Thari Maotoe.
