= Madibeng Local Municipality =

Coordinates: 25°25′S 27°45′E

Madibeng
- Local municipality
- Seal

- Location in the North West
- Country: South Africa
- Province: North West
- District: Bojanala Platinum
- Seat: Brits
- Wards: 41

Government
  - Type: Municipal council
  - Mayor: Douglas Tlhogokgolo Maimane

Area
  - Total: 3,839 km^{2} (1,482 sq mi)

Population (2011)
  - Total: 477,381
  - Density: 124.4/km^{2} (322.1/sq mi)

Racial makeup (2011)
  - Black African: 89.3%
  - Coloured: 0.9%
  - Indian/Asian: 0.5%
  - White: 8.9%

First languages (2011)
  - Tswana: 43.5%
  - Tsonga: 11.0%
  - Afrikaans: 9.0%
  - Northern Sotho: 7.9%
  - Other: 28.6%
- Time zone: UTC+2 (SAST)
- Municipal code: NW372

Madibeng Municipality (Tswana: Mmasepala wa Madibeng; Tsonga: Masipala wa Madibeng) is a local municipality within the Bojanala Platinum District Municipality, in the North West province of South Africa. The seat of the municipality is Brits. The popular tourist area of Hartbeespoort is also located in the municipality.

== Main places ==
The 2001 census divided the municipality into the following main places:

Place	Code	Area (km^{2})	Population	Most spoken language
Bafokeng	60201	7.36	17,380	Tswana
Bakgatla Ba Mmakau	60202	214.97	58,055	Tswana
Bakwena Ba Magopa	60203	95.43	33,566	Tswana
Bakwena Boo Modimosana Ba Ga Makau	60204	387.26	15,613	Tswana
Bapo Ba Ga Mogale	60205	20.53	37,311	Tswana
Borakalalo Nature Reserve	60206	73.85	48	Tswana
Brits	60207	24.80	12,383	Afrikaans
Damonsville	60208	0.59	1,680	Afrikaans
Elandsdrift	60209	0.08	255	Xhosa
Ga-Rankuwa	60210	508.02	37,533	Tswana
Hartbeespoort Dam Nature Reserve	60211	23.99	42	Afrikaans
Hartebeesfontein New Paradise	60212	1.33	93	Afrikaans
Hartebeespoort	60213	13.27	6,329	Afrikaans
Jonathan	60214	26.87	625	Zulu
Letlhabile	60215	10.38	35,606	Tswana
Magaliesberg Nature Reserve	60217	20.80	329	Afrikaans
Maroelakop	60218	0.47	2,523	Xhosa
Mooinooi	60219	3.15	3,894	Afrikaans
Oskraal	60220	15.74	934	Tswana
Oukasie	60221	3.73	19,627	Tswana
Pelindaba	60222	20.23	156	Afrikaans
Sechaba-Sa-Ba-Taung	60223	27.53	12,306	Sotho
Sonop	60224	3.04	1,946	Afrikaans
Western Platinum Mines	60225	0.79	5,090	Xhosa
Remainder of the municipality	60216	2,310.16	34,936	Tswana

== Politics ==
The municipal council consists of eighty-two members elected by mixed-member proportional representation. Forty-one councillors are elected by first-past-the-post voting in forty-one wards, while the remaining forty-one are chosen from party lists so that the total number of party representatives is proportional to the number of votes received.

In the election of 4 November 2026 the African National Congress (ANC) lost its majority for the first time, but still won the largest number of seats.

The following table shows the results of the election.

Party	Ward			List			Total seats
Party	Votes	%	Seats	Votes	%	Seats	Total seats
African National Congress	50,690	41.29	29	50,941	41.77	5	34
Economic Freedom Fighters	18,952	15.44	3	19,421	15.92	10	13
Democratic Alliance	18,395	14.98	5	18,244	14.96	7	12
Freedom Front Plus	7,934	6.46	1	7,923	6.50	5	6
ActionSA	7,284	5.93	0	8,043	6.59	5	5
South African Communist Party	5,853	4.77	1	5,407	4.43	3	4
uMkhonto weSizwe Party	1,824	1.49	0	1,713	1.40	1	1
Community Independant Party	1,663	1.35	0	1,472	1.21	1	1
Labour Party	1,263	1.03	0	1,240	1.02	1	1
Save South Africa	1,147	0.93	0	1,002	0.82	1	1
Al Jama-ah	1,027	0.84	1	968	0.79	0	1
African Christian Democratic Party	831	0.68	0	921	0.76	1	1
Independent candidates	1,359	1.11	1				1
United Africans Transformation	457	0.37	0	633	0.52	1	1
24 other parties	4,083	3.33	0	4,034	3.31	0	0
Total	122,762	100.00	41	121,962	100.00	41	82
Valid votes	122,762	98.01		121,962	97.67		
Invalid/blank votes	2,488	1.99		2,904	2.33		
Total votes	125,250	100.00		124,866	100.00		
Registered voters/turnout	254,573	49.20		254,573	49.05		

== Corruption ==
The municipality has been plagued by corruption, and has spent over R7 million on forensic investigations. In spite of senior officials being identified, no action has been taken. Irregular expenditure was up to R2.6 billion in the 2020/21 financial year.

As of 2024, the municipality owed Eskom and the City of Tshwane millions, while much of the community went without working roads, water, sanitation, electricity, housing and sewerage.
