= Temba =

Temba is a male given name and may refer to:

- Temba Bavuma, a South African cricketer
- Temba, Gauteng, a town located in the Gauteng province of South Africa
- Paul Temba Nyathi, Zimbabwean politician
- Temba Tsheri, Sherpa from Nepal and youngest person to climb Mount Everest
- Brian Temba, (born Brian Themba Makiwane), a South African born performer, singer, songwriter and producer
- Another name for the Tém people who live primarily in Togo
- Temba is an open source model for sharing electrical power across Africa
