= Wolwekraal =

- Location within Mpumalanga Location within South Africa
- Coordinates: 25.153°S 28.961°E
- Country: South Africa
- Province: Mpumalanga
- District: Nkangala
- Municipality: Dr JS Moroka

Area
  - Total: 4.88 km^{2} (1.88 sq mi)

Population (2011)
  - Total: 7,426
  - Density: 1,520/km^{2} (3,940/sq mi)

Racial makeup (2011)
  - Black African: 99.4%
  - Indian/Asian: 0.2%
  - White: 0.3%
  - Other: 0.1%

First languages (2011)
  - S. Ndebele: 72.6%
  - Northern Sotho: 15.7%
  - Sotho: 3.5%
  - Zulu: 2.5%
  - Other: 5.8%
- Time zone: UTC+2 (SAST)

Wolwekraal, also known as Maphotla, is a settlement in Dr JS Moroka Local Municipality in the Mpumalanga province of South Africa.

== Demographics ==
There is almost 75% of Ndebele & 38% of Sepedi, and also 5.8% for other Languages.

The following statistics are from the 2001 census.

Language	Population	%
IsiNdebele	319 920	31.35%
IsiZulu	232 228	22.75%
Sepedi	161 338	15.81%
Afrikaans	75 294	7.38%
SiSwati	56 496	5.54%
Setswana	56 144	5.50%
Sesotho	42 474	4.16%
Xitsonga	31 624	3.10%
IsiXhosa	21 199	2.08%
English	17 705	1.73%
Other	3 514	0.34%
Tshivenda	2 654	0.26%

=== Gender ===
Gender	Population	%
Female	529 354	51.87%
Male	491 238	48.13%

=== Ethnic group ===
Ethnic group	Population	%
Black African	930 873	91.21%
White	78 292	7.67%
Coloured	8 741	0.86%
Indian/Asian	2 686	0.26%

=== Age ===
Age	Population	%
0–4	108 087	10.59%
4–9	114 037	11.17%
10–14	118 590	11.62%
15–19	118 041	11.57%
20–24	98 429	9.64%
25–29	88 106	8.63%
30–34	74 084	7.26%
35–39	69 442	6.80%
40–44	58 251	5.71%
45–49	47 903	4.69%
50–54	35 359	3.46%
55–59	25 013	2.45%
60–64	20 550	2.01%
65–69	14 314	1.40%
70–74	12 782	1.25%
75–79	7 302	0.72%
80–84	6 344	0.62%
85–89	2 273	0.22%
90–94	1 080	0.11%
95–99	420	0.04%
100 and over	185	0.02%
