= Mdala Game Reserve =

Protected area in Mpumalanga, South Africa

- Location: Mpumalanga, South Africa

Mdala Game Reserve is a protected area in Mpumalanga, South Africa.
