= Moretele Local Municipality =

Coordinates: 25°10′S 28°5′E

Moretele
- Local municipality
- Seal

- Location in the North West
- Country: South Africa
- Province: North West
- District: Bojanala Platinum
- Seat: Makapanstad
- Wards: 26

Government
  - Type: Municipal council
  - Mayor: Cllr Andries Monageng (ANC)
  - PR Cllr and ACG Whip in Council: Cllr. Shangy Mbekwa

Area
  - Total: 1,379 km^{2} (532 sq mi)

Population (2011)
  - Total: 186,947
  - Density: 135.6/km^{2} (351.1/sq mi)

Racial makeup (2011)
  - Black African: 99.4%
  - Coloured: 0.2%
  - Indian/Asian: 0.1%
  - White: 0.2%

First languages (2011)
  - Tswana: 51.7%
  - Tsonga: 18.4%
  - Northern Sotho: 13.9%
  - Zulu: 3.5%
  - Other: 12.5%
- Time zone: UTC+2 (SAST)
- Municipal code: NW371

Moretele Municipality (Tswana: Mmasepala wa Moretele; Tsonga: Masipala wa Moretele; Northern Sotho: Mmasepala wa Moretele) is a local municipality within the Bojanala Platinum District Municipality, in the North West province of South Africa. As of 2011, its population was approximately 180,000, a majority of whom speak Setswana as a first language.

== Main places ==
The 2001 census divided the municipality into the following main places:

Place	Code	Area (km^{2})	Population	Most spoken language					
Agisaneng	60101	9.42	120	Northern Sotho					
Amandebele A Lebelo	60102	4.99	154	English					
Bahwaduba	60103	180.68	32,023	Tswana					
Bakgatla Ba Ga Mosetlha	60104	459.19	45,114	Tswana					
Bakgatla Ba Mmakau	60105	109.41	1,111	Tswana					
Bakgatla Ba Mphe Batho	60106	45.81	24,329	Tswana					
Baphuthing Ba Ga Nawa	60107	228.03	11,024	Tswana					
Diphala	60108	0.61	820	Tswana					
Jonathan	60109	4.11	114	Zulu					
Kopanong	60110	84.98	28,839	Tsonga					
Modimole Magogelo	60111	104.32	11,365	Tswana					
Mogogelo	60112	26.02	10,500	-	Moretele	60113	30.44	4,933	Setswana
Temba	60114	2.19	5,310	Setswana					
Thulwe	60115	15.15	465	Tsonga					
Tsoga o Itirele	60116	64.32	1,687	Zulu					

Ruigtesloot

== Politics ==
The municipal council consists of fifty members elected by mixed-member proportional representation. Twenty-five councillors are elected by first-past-the-post voting in twenty-five wards, while the remaining twenty-five are chosen from party lists so that the total number of party representatives is proportional to the number of votes received.

In the election of 4 November 2026 the African National Congress (ANC) won a majority of twenty-nine seats.

The following table shows the results of the election.

Party	Ward			List			Total seats
Party	Votes	%	Seats	Votes	%	Seats	Total seats
African National Congress	28,452	56.24	25	28,555	56.69	4	29
ActionSA	6,289	12.43	0	6,581	13.06	7	7
Economic Freedom Fighters	5,299	10.47	0	5,205	10.33	5	5
Democratic Alliance	4,384	8.67	0	4,436	8.81	5	5
uMkhonto weSizwe Party	1,395	2.76	0	1,374	2.73	2	2
South African Communist Party	1,274	2.52	0	1,105	2.19	1	1
African Independent Congress	857	1.69	0	632	1.25	1	1
Independent candidates	322	0.64	0				0
20 other parties	2,320	4.59	0	2,485	4.93	0	0
Total	50,592	100.00	25	50,373	100.00	25	50
Valid votes	50,592	97.63		50,373	97.61		
Invalid/blank votes	1,230	2.37		1,234	2.39		
Total votes	51,822	100.00		51,607	100.00		
Registered voters/turnout	107,051	48.41		107,051	48.21		
