= Moses Kotane Local Municipality =

Coordinates: 25°10′S 26°50′E

Moses Kotane
- Local municipality
- Seal

- Location in the North West
- Country: South Africa
- Province: North West
- District: Bojanala Platinum
- Seat: Mogwase
- Wards: 31

Government
  - Type: Municipal council
  - Mayor: Peter Molelekeng

Area
  - Total: 5,719 km^{2} (2,208 sq mi)

Population (2011)
  - Total: 242,554
  - Density: 42.41/km^{2} (109.8/sq mi)

Racial makeup (2011)
  - Black African: 98.3%
  - Coloured: 0.3%
  - Indian/Asian: 0.5%
  - White: 0.8%

First languages (2011)
  - Tswana: 81.6%
  - Zulu: 4.1%
  - Xhosa: 3.4%
  - English: 3.0%
  - Other: 7.9%
- Time zone: UTC+2 (SAST)
- Municipal code: NW375

Moses Kotane Municipality (Tswana: Mmasepala wa Moses Kotane) is a local municipality within the Bojanala Platinum District Municipality, in the North West province of South Africa. It is named in memory of Moses Kotane. The seat of the municipality is Mogwase.

== Main places ==
The 2001 census divided the municipality into the following main places:

Place	Code	Area (km^{2})	Population	Most spoken language
Amahlubi	60501	563.29	3,646	Xhosa
Bafokeng	60502	138.54	4,305	Tswana
Bakgatla Ba Ga Kgafela	60503	1,166.89	75,072	Tswana
Bakubung Ba Ratheo	60504	203.24	19,800	Tswana
Bakwena Ba Mare A Phogole	60505	72.95	3,314	Tswana
Bakwena Boo Modimosana	60506	235.27	14,364	Tswana
Baphalane	60507	656.08	22,101	Tswana
Baphiring	60508	152.35	8,887	Tswana
Bapo 2 Ba Ga Mogale	60509	5.08	4,415	Tswana
BAPO 2	60510	0.82	1,643	Tswana
Barokologadi Ba Ga Maotwa	60511	289.33	7,100	Tswana
Bataung Ba Moubane	60512	1.52	529	Tswana
Batlhako Boo Mututu Ba Ga Mabe	60513	305.38	15,526	Tswana
Batlhalerwa	60514	641.83	9,224	Tswana
Batlokwa Ba Bogatsu	60515	212.95	16,518	Tswana
Batlokwa Ba Ga Sedumedi	60516	17.76	7,044	Tswana
Batlokwa Boo Matlapane	60517	70.26	1,444	Tswana
Dinokaneng	60518	128.10	48	Tswana
Mahobieskraal	60519	0.64	0	-
Makuntlwane A Kgote	60520	4.70	1,689	Tswana
Mixed TA	60521	63.00	0	-
Mogwase	60522	15.76	9,342	Tswana
Mokgatlha	60523	4.95	4,252	Tswana
Mokgautsi	60524	2.18	2,271	Tswana
Molorwe	60525	2.43	2,232	Tswana
Sun City	60526	64.28	2,590	English
Zwartklip	60527	3.54	1,413	Xhosa
Remainder of the municipality	60525	194.14	337	Tswana

== Politics ==
The municipal council consists of sixty-nine members elected by mixed-member proportional representation. Thirty-five councillors are elected by first-past-the-post voting in thirty-five wards, while the remaining thirty-four are chosen from party lists so that the total number of party representatives is proportional to the number of votes received.

In the 2026 South African municipal elections the African National Congress (ANC) won a majority of thirty-five seats on the council.

The following table shows the results of the election.

Party	Ward			List			Total seats
Party	Votes	%	Seats	Votes	%	Seats	Total seats
African National Congress	28,822	49.74	33	29,574	51.49	2	35
Economic Freedom Fighters	8,891	15.34	1	9,370	16.32	10	11
Democratic Alliance	3,387	5.84	0	3,675	6.40	4	4
South African Communist Party	3,544	6.12	0	3,188	5.55	4	4
ActionSA	1,963	3.39	0	2,300	4.00	3	3
uMkhonto weSizwe Party	1,644	2.84	0	1,606	2.80	2	2
Independent candidates	2,598	4.48	1				1
Seriti Le Kaelo Independent Party	1,000	1.73	0	929	1.62	1	1
Purple Party Ikageng	937	1.62	0	938	1.63	1	1
African Christian Democratic Party	581	1.00	0	682	1.19	1	1
Labour Party	591	1.02	0	670	1.17	1	1
United Christian Democratic Party	558	0.96	0	554	0.96	1	1
African People's Convention	486	0.84	0	580	1.01	1	1
Bophuthatswana Civil Movement	363	0.63	0	563	0.98	1	1
Tsogang Civic Movement	356	0.61	0	388	0.68	1	1
African Transformation Movement	331	0.57	0	406	0.71	1	1
13 other parties	1,899	3.28	0	2,008	3.50	0	0
Total	57,951	100.00	35	57,431	100.00	34	69
Valid votes	57,951	97.60		57,431	96.97		
Invalid/blank votes	1,425	2.40		1,794	3.03		
Total votes	59,376	100.00		59,225	100.00		
Registered voters/turnout	137,803	43.09		137,803	42.98		

== Education ==
J M Ntsime High School is situated in Zone 4 Mogwase, Moses Kotane Local Municipality, on the outskirts of Rustenburg, South Africa. The school was established in 1989 from Nkakane High School which used to share premises with Mogwase Middle School. It is named after a famous Setswana novelist, dramatist and former minister of education of the Bophuthatswana homeland government, J M Ntsime, to acknowledge his contribution to preserve the language and culture. The school has a student body of over 800, and staff including 40 teachers.
