= Bojanala Platinum District Municipality =

Bojanala Platinum
- District municipality
- Seal

- Location in South Africa
- Coordinates: 25°25′S 27°15′E
- Country: South Africa
- Province: North West
- Seat: Rustenburg
- Local municipalities: List: Moretele; Madibeng; Rustenburg; Kgetlengrivier; Moses Kotane

Government
  - Type: Municipal council
  - Mayor: Lj Diremelo

Area
  - Total: 18,333 km^{2} (7,078 sq mi)

Population (2011)
  - Total: 1,507,505
  - Density: 82.229/km^{2} (212.97/sq mi)

Racial makeup (2022)
  - Black African: 95.4%
  - Coloured: 0.7%
  - Indian/Asian: 0.1%
  - White: 3.7%

First languages (2011)
  - Tswana: 55.3%
  - Tsonga: 8.1%
  - Afrikaans: 7.2%
  - Xhosa: 5.6%
  - Other: 23.8%
- Time zone: UTC+2 (SAST)
- Municipal code: DC37

The Bojanala Platinum District Municipality (Tswana: Mmasepala wa Sedika wa Bojanala Platinum) is one of the 4 districts of the North West province of South Africa. The seat of the municipality is Rustenburg. As of 2011, a majority of its 1,507,505 residents spoke Setswana. The district code is DC37.

== Geography ==
=== Neighbours ===
Bojanala Platinum is surrounded by:

- Waterberg (DC36) to the north;
- Tshwane (Pretoria) to the east;
- West Rand (CBDC8) to the south-east;
- Dr Kenneth Kaunda (DC40) to the south;
- Ngaka Modiri Molema (DC38) to the west.

=== Local municipalities ===
The district contains the following local municipalities:

| Local municipality | Population | % | Dominant language |
|---|---|---|---|
| Rustenburg | 562 031 | 34.60% | Tswana |
| Madibeng | 522 566 | 32.17% | Tswana |
| Moses Kotane | 265 668 | 16.35% | Tswana |
| Moretele | 219 120 | 13.49% | Tswana |
| Kgetlengrivier | 54 759 | 3.37% | Tswana |

== Demographics ==
The following statistics are from the 2011 census.

| Language | Population | % |
|---|---|---|
| Setswana | 818,050 | 55.34% |
| Xitsonga | 119,090 | 8.06% |
| Afrikaans | 106,561 | 7.21% |
| IsiXhosa | 82,701 | 5.59% |
| Sepedi | 75,539 | 5.11% |
| Sesotho | 67,458 | 4.56% |
| English | 57,187 | 3.87% |
| IsiZulu | 54,661 | 3.70% |
| Other | 39,869 | 2.70% |
| IsiNdebele | 26,481 | 1.79% |
| Tshivenda | 14,329 | 0.97% |
| SiSwati | 9,632 | 0.65% |

=== Gender ===
| Gender | Population | % |
|---|---|---|
| Male | 825,065 | 50.80% |
| Female | 799,079 | 49.30% |

=== Ethnic group ===
| Ethnic group | Population | % |
|---|---|---|
| Black African | 1,093,177 | 92.23% |
| White | 82,045 | 6.92% |
| Coloured | 6,360 | 0.54% |
| Indian/Asian | 3,743 | 0.32% |

=== Age ===
| Age | Population | % |
|---|---|---|
| 000 - 004 | 108,805 | 9.18% |
| 005 - 009 | 113,058 | 9.54% |
| 010 - 014 | 121,707 | 10.27% |
| 015 - 019 | 115,306 | 9.73% |
| 020 - 024 | 110,477 | 9.32% |
| 025 - 029 | 111,264 | 9.39% |
| 030 - 034 | 98,631 | 8.32% |
| 035 - 039 | 93,814 | 7.91% |
| 040 - 044 | 81,984 | 6.92% |
| 045 - 049 | 62,264 | 5.25% |
| 050 - 054 | 44,466 | 3.75% |
| 055 - 059 | 34,288 | 2.89% |
| 060 - 064 | 27,783 | 2.34% |
| 065 - 069 | 21,309 | 1.80% |
| 070 - 074 | 16,438 | 1.39% |
| 075 - 079 | 10,575 | 0.89% |
| 080 - 084 | 7,800 | 0.66% |
| 085 - 089 | 3,115 | 0.26% |
| 090 - 094 | 1,424 | 0.12% |
| 095 - 099 | 614 | 0.05% |
| 100 plus | 203 | 0.02% |

== Politics ==
=== Election results ===
Election results for Bojanala Platinum in the South African general election, 2004.

- Population 18 and over: 772,262 [65.15% of total population]
- Total votes: 445,856 [37.61% of total population]
- Voting % estimate: 57.73% votes as a % of population 18 and over

| Party | Votes | % |
|---|---|---|
| African National Congress | 372,834 | 83.62% |
| Democratic Alliance | 25,214 | 5.66% |
| United Christian Democratic Party | 20,370 | 4.57% |
| United Democratic Movement | 7,472 | 1.68% |
| African Christian Democratic Party | 5,085 | 1.14% |
| Freedom Front Plus | 4,022 | 0.90% |
| Pan African Congress | 2,964 | 0.66% |
| New National Party | 1,597 | 0.36% |
| Independent Democrats | 1,426 | 0.32% |
| Inkhata Freedom Party | 1,384 | 0.31% |
| Azanian People's Organisation | 996 | 0.22% |
| NA | 477 | 0.11% |
| SOPA | 424 | 0.10% |
| EMSA | 346 | 0.08% |
| CDP | 293 | 0.07% |
| UF | 268 | 0.06% |
| PJC | 190 | 0.04% |
| TOP | 187 | 0.04% |
| KISS | 122 | 0.03% |
| Minority Front | 100 | 0.02% |
| NLP | 85 | 0.02% |
| Total | 445,856 | 100.00% |

== Corruption ==
In October 2023, the Hawks arrested the council's municipal manager, who was implicated in corruption involving R134 million, including spending R2 million on two laptops.
