= List of members of the 4th North West Provincial Legislature =

4th North West Provincial Legislature
←	3rd Legislature	5th Legislature	→

Overview
- Legislative body: North West Provincial Legislature
- Jurisdiction: North West, South Africa
- Term: 6 May 2009 – May 2014
- Election: 22 April 2009
- Members: 33
- Speaker: Nono Maloyi (2009–12); Supra Mahumapelo (2012–14)
- Premier: Maureen Modiselle (2009–10); Thandi Modise (2010–14)

This is a list of members of the fourth North West Provincial Legislature as elected in the election of 22 April 2009. In that election, the African National Congress (ANC) maintained a comfortable majority of 25 seats in the 33-seat legislature, although this represented a loss of two seats since the third legislature. Three seats apiece went to the Democratic Alliance and to a new entrant, the Congress of the People. The United Christian Democratic Party, formerly the official opposition, held two seats, while the Freedom Front Plus lost its representation altogether for the first time since the legislature was established in 1994.

When the legislature convened for the first time on 6 May 2009, the ANC's Maureen Modiselle was elected as the third Premier of the North West, succeeding Edna Molewa. She announced her Executive Council later the same day. Nono Maloyi was elected as Speaker of the North West Provincial Legislature. However, neither served the full term in their offices: on 19 November 2010, Thandi Modise was elected as Premier after Modiselle was sacked by her party; and Supra Mahumapelo was elected to succeed Maloyi as Speaker on 3 April 2012.

== Composition ==
Party	Seats
African National Congress	25
Congress of the People	3
Democratic Alliance	3
UCDP	2
Total	33

== Members ==
This is a list of members of the second legislature as elected on 22 April 2009. It does not take into account changes in membership after the election.

Name	Party
Annanias Edward Baloyi	ANC
Raymond Elisha	ANC
John Dunn Franzsen	DA
Hoffman Galeng	ANC
Christian Hattingh	DA
Rebecca Kasienyane	ANC
Gordon Kegakilwe	ANC
Kesenkamang Veronica Kekesi	ANC
Xolile Victor Kheswa	COPE
Louisa Mabe	ANC
Mahlakeng Mahlakeng	ANC
Moitoi Malethola Yvonne Makume	ANC
Nono Maloyi	ANC
Wendy Matsemela	ANC
Lucas Mangope	UCDP
Jeannette Keseabetswe Nandi Mashori	COPE
Sipho Mfundisi	UCDP
Tebogo Modise	ANC
Maureen Modiselle	ANC
John Kabelo Moepeng	ANC
Mosetsanagape Mokomele-Mothibi	ANC
Auchalie Johannes Mothupi	ANC
Fenny Motladiile	ANC
Sello Petrus Motswenyane	DA
Nikiwe Num-Mangqo	COPE
Grace Pampiri	ANC
Lentikile Patrick Pelele	ANC
Motlalepula Rosho	ANC
Paul Sebegoe	ANC
Desbo Sefanyetso	ANC
Johannes Tselapedi	ANC
Boitumelo Tshwene	ANC
Howard Yawa	ANC

== See also ==
- Marikana massacre
