= List of members of the 6th North West Provincial Legislature =

6th North West Provincial Legislature
←	5th Legislature	7th Legislature	→

Overview
- Legislative body: North West Provincial Legislature
- Jurisdiction: North West, South Africa
- Meeting place: 3138 Lucas Mangope Hwy, Mmabatho Unit 1, Mmabatho, 2790
- Term: 22 May 2019 – 28 May 2024
- Election: 8 May 2019
- Members: 30
- Speaker: Sussana Dantjie
- Deputy Speaker: Viola Motsumi
- Premier: Bushy Maape
- Leader of the Opposition: Keobakile Babuile

This is a list of members of the sixth North West Provincial Legislature, as elected in the election of 8 May 2019 and taking into account changes in membership since the election. The provincial legislature dissolved on 28 May 2024, ahead of the 2024 general election, and was succeeded by the 7th legislature.

== Current composition ==
Party	Seats
African National Congress	21
Economic Freedom Fighters	6
DA	4
VF+	2
Total	33

== Graphical representation ==
This is a graphical comparison of party strengths as they were in the 6th North West Provincial Legislature.

- Note this is not the official seating plan of the North West Provincial Legislature.

== Members ==
Name	Party	Position
Keobakile Babuile	EFF	Member
Matshidiso Botswe	EFF	Member
Mmoloki Cwaile	ANC	Member
Sussana Dantjie	ANC	Speaker
Betty Diale	EFF	Member
Modiegi Dikolomela	EFF	Member
Job Dliso	ANC	Member
Gavin Edwards	DA	Member
Kelebogile Kerileng	EFF	Member
Erns Kleynhans	FF+	Member
Sello Lehari	ANC	Member
Bitsa Lenkopane	ANC	Member
Bushy Maape	ANC	Premier
Nono Maloyi	ANC	Member
Kabelo Mataboge	ANC	Member
Lazarus Mokgosi	ANC	Member
Lenah Miga	ANC	Member
Desbo Mohono	ANC	Member
Boitumelo Moiloa	ANC	Member
Gaoage Oageng Molapisi	ANC	Member
Kenetswe Mosenogi	ANC	Member
Viola Motsumi	ANC	Deputy Speaker
Aaron Motswana	ANC	Member
De Wet Nel	FF+	Member
Winston Rabotapi	DA	Member
Motlalepula Rosho	ANC	Member
Madoda Sambatha	ANC	Member
Paul Sebegoe	ANC	Chief Whip of the Majority Party
Freddy Sonakile	DA	Member
Jacqueline Theologo	DA	Member
Virginia Tlhapi	ANC	Member
Priscilla Williams	ANC	Member
Lebogang Emmanuel Xaba	EFF	Member

Three ANC members were sworn into the legislature during the term as the result of casual vacancies in ANC seats: Lenah Miga joined in September 2020, following the death of Gordon Kegakilwe; Nono Maloyi joined in November 2022, following the resignation of Kim Medupe; and Lazarus Mokgosi joined in December 2022, following the resignation of Mmaphefo Matsemela.
