= List of members of the 3rd North West Provincial Legislature =

3rd North West Provincial Legislature
| ← | 2nd Legislature | 4th Legislature | → |

Overview
- Legislative body: North West Provincial Legislature
- Jurisdiction: North West, South Africa
- Term: 26 April 2004 – April 2009
- Election: 14 April 2004
- Members: 33
- Speaker: Thandi Modise
- Premier: Edna Molewa
- Leader of the Opposition: Lucas Mangope

This is a list of members of the third North West Provincial Legislature as elected in the election of 14 April 2004. In that election, the African National Congress (ANC) maintained the majority it had held during the second legislature, holding all of its 27 seats, while the official opposition, the United Christian Democratic Party, retained its three seats. The Freedom Front Plus retained its single seat. Thus the only change in the legislature's composition was the disappearance of the New National Party, which ceded its former seat to the Democratic Alliance.

When the legislature convened for the first time on 26 April 2004, the ANC's Edna Molewa was elected as the second Premier of the North West, succeeding Popo Molefe. Thandi Modise was elected as Speaker of the North West Provincial Legislature.

== Composition ==
| Party | Seats |
|---|---|
| African National Congress | 27 |
| UCDP | 3 |
| Democratic Alliance | 2 |
| VF+ | 1 |
| Total | 33 |

== Members ==
This is a list of members of the second legislature as elected on 14 April 2004. It does not take into account changes in membership after the election.

| Name | Party |
|---|---|
| Darkey Africa | ANC |
| Ndleleni Duma | ANC |
| Andrew Gerber | FF+ |
| Herman Groenewald | DA |
| Temba Bennet Gwabeni | ANC |
| Opadile Nelson Hantise | ANC |
| Christian Hattingh | DA |
| Kesenkamang Veronica Kekesi | ANC |
| Jomo Khasu | ANC |
| Olehile George Madoda | ANC |
| Mahlakeng Mahlakeng | ANC |
| Njomyana David Mahlangu | ANC |
| Supra Mahumapelo | ANC |
| Moitoi Malethola Yvonne Makume | ANC |
| Lucas Mangope | UCDP |
| Mavis Matladi | UCDP |
| Eliot Mayisela | ANC |
| Botlhajane Sarah Mereeotlhe | ANC |
| Poppy Audrey Mocumi | ANC |
| Thandi Modise | ANC |
| Maureen Modiselle | ANC |
| Tumelo Samuel Mokaila | ANC |
| Mamphahlela Louisa Molema | ANC |
| Edna Molewa | ANC |
| Nikiwe Num | ANC |
| Phuthego Joel Seleke | UCDP |
| Rachel Rasmeni | ANC |
| Jan Serfontein | ANC |
| Jerry Thibedi | ANC |
| Zacharia Pitso Tolo | ANC |
| Johannes Tselapedi | ANC |
| Frans Vilakazi | ANC |
| Howard Yawa | ANC |
