= List of members of the 5th North West Provincial Legislature =

5th North West Provincial Legislature
←	4th Legislature	6th Legislature	→

Overview
- Legislative body: North West Provincial Legislature
- Jurisdiction: North West, South Africa
- Term: 21 May 2014 – May 2019
- Election: 7 May 2014
- Members: 33
- Speaker: Sussana Tsebe
- Deputy Speaker: Jane Manganye
- Premier: Supra Mahumapelo (2014–18); Job Mokgoro (2018–19)
- Party strengths in the fifth legislature EFF ANC DA FF+

This is a list of members of the fifth North West Provincial Legislature as elected in the election of 7 May 2014. In that election, the African National Congress (ANC) maintained a comfortable but diminished majority of 23 seats in the 33-seat legislature. A new entrant, the Economic Freedom Fighters (EFF), became the official opposition, winning five seats. Also represented were the Democratic Alliance, which won four seats, and the Freedom Front Plus, which won one seat after having had no representation in the fourth legislature. The Congress of the People, which had been the official opposition during the fourth legislature, did not win any seats, nor did the United Christian Democratic Party.

The legislature convened for the first time on 21 May 2014. After being sworn in to their seats, members elected the ANC's Supra Mahumapelo as the fifth Premier of the North West. He succeeded Thandi Modise, who, though initially re-elected as a Member of the Provincial Legislature, was soon afterwards appointed as Chairperson of the National Council of Provinces. Sussana Tsebe was elected as Speaker of the North West Provincial Legislature, with Jane Manganye as her deputy. Mahumapelo resigned as Premier in May 2018 and was replaced by Job Mokgoro the following month.

Mahumapelo's resignation followed violent service delivery protests in the province, as well as an attempted motion of no confidence in his leadership, lodged by the EFF. Indeed, the fifth legislature's term had begun amid political turmoil, particularly due to the 2012 Marikana massacre and subsequent labour organising on the platinum belt. From May 2018 until the end of the legislature's term, the provincial government of the North West was placed under administration by the national government amid a collapse of public services.

== Composition ==
Party	Seats
African National Congress	23
Economic Freedom Fighters	5
Democratic Alliance	4
VF+	1
Total	33

== Members ==
This is a list of members of the second legislature as elected on 7 May 2014. It does not take into account changes in membership after the election.

Name	Party
Keobakile Phanuel Babuile	EFF
Betty Kedisaletse Diale	EFF
Ndleleni Duma	ANC
Raymond Elisha	ANC
Tutu Lawrence Faleni	DA
Hoffman Galeng	ANC
Fenny Gaolaolwe	ANC
Christian Hattingh	DA
Gordon Kegakilwe	ANC
Nomboniso Annie Klaas-Harman	EFF
Mahlakeng Mahlakeng	ANC
Supra Mahumapelo	ANC
Collen Maine	ANC
Nono Maloyi	ANC
Jane Manganye	ANC
Johannes Billyboy Mashifane	EFF
Magome Masike	ANC
Wendy Matsemela	ANC
Tebogo Modise	ANC
Thandi Modise	ANC
Desbo Mohono	ANC
Boitumelo Moiloa	ANC
Saliva Molapisi	ANC
Alfred Norman Motsi	EFF
Ntebaleng Jeannete Nyathi	ANC
Sello Petrus Motswenyane	DA
Wendy Nelson	ANC
Motlalepula Rosho	ANC
Madoda Sambatha	ANC
Johannes Francois Schutte	FF+
Jacqueline Theologo	DA
Manketsi Tlhape	ANC
Sussana Tsebe	ANC
