= List of members of the 2nd North West Provincial Legislature =

2nd North West Provincial Legislature
←	1st Legislature	3rd Legislature	→

Overview
- Legislative body: North West Provincial Legislature
- Jurisdiction: North West, South Africa
- Term: June 1999 – April 2004
- Election: 2 June 1999
- Members: 33
- Speaker: O. J. Tselapedi
- Premier: Popo Molefe
- Leader of the Opposition: Lucas Mangope

This is a list of members of the second North West Provincial Legislature as elected in the election of 2 June 1999. In that election, the African National Congress (ANC) slightly augmented the majority it had won in South Africa's first post-apartheid elections in 1994; it controlled 27 seats in the 33-seat legislature. The ANC's Popo Molefe was elected to his second term as Premier of the North West, and O. J. Tselapedi was elected as Speaker of the North West Provincial Legislature.

The official opposition was the United Christian Democratic Party, a new entrant, led by former Bophuthatswana leader Lucas Mangope; the Democratic Party also gained representation for the first time, with a single seat. The Freedom Front and New National Party retained one seat apiece.

== Composition ==
Party	Seats
African National Congress	27
UCDP	3
Democratic Party	1
FF	1
New National Party	1
Total	33

== Members ==
This is a list of members of the second legislature as elected on 2 June 1999. It does not take into account changes in membership after the election.

Name	Party
Darkey Africa	ANC
Maggie Mirriam Bopalamo	ANC
Ephraim Lungile Dantjie	ANC
Percy Percival Dyonase	ANC
Christian Hattingh	DP
Pieter Groenewald	FF
Kesenkamang Veronica Kekezi	ANC
Jomo Khasu	ANC
Martin John Kuscus	ANC
Mamatlhodi Mary Lehola	ANC
Olehile George Madoda	ANC
Njomyana David Mahlangu	ANC
Lucas Mangope	UCDP
Joyce Mabel Masilo	ANC
Mavis Matladi	UCDP
Eliot Mayisela	ANC
Botlhajane Sarah Mereeotlhe	ANC
Maureen Modiselle	ANC
Justice Moeti Moiloa	ANC
Popo Molefe	ANC
Edna Molewa	ANC
Abram Jane Letlhogile Moseki	ANC
Raymond Lobang Motsepe	ANC
Bafitlhile Pule	UCDP
Rachel Rasmeni	ANC
Molefi Sefularo	ANC
Jan Serfontein	ANC
Jerry Thibedi	ANC
Zacharia Pitso Tolo	ANC
Johannes Tselapedi	ANC
Ziphora Tumagole	ANC
Abraham Adriaan Venter	NNP
Frans Vilakazi	ANC
