= Executive Council of the North West =

Provincial government in South Africa

The Executive Council of the North West is the cabinet of the executive branch of the provincial government in the South African province of the North West. The Members of the Executive Council (MECs) are appointed from among the members of the North West Provincial Legislature by the Premier of the North West, an office held since June 2024 by Lazarus Mokgosi of the African National Congress (ANC).

== Molewa premiership: 2004–2009 ==
Pursuant to the 2004 general election, Edna Molewa was elected Premier of the North West; she announced her Executive Council on 30 April 2004. On 23 August 2005, Molewa announced a reshuffle in which no MECs were fired but most changed positions; the reshuffle also included a reconfiguration of the provincial government's portfolios, as safety was merged with roads and transport, finance was split from economic development, and tourism was split from agriculture to merge with economic development. On 10 May 2007, Molewa announced a second reshuffle, to take effect from 1 June; it affected only three portfolios and again involved no dismissals. In July 2007, Mandlenkosi Mayisela was removed as MEC for Agriculture – a controversial decision which he contested – and was replaced in an acting capacity by Frans Vilakazi and then by Darkie Afrika. In October, Jan Serfontein was appointed as his permanent replacement.

North West Executive Council 2004–2009
Position	Member	Term		Party
Premier of the North West	Edna Molewa	2004	2009	ANC
MEC for Finance	Maureen Modiselle	2005	2009	ANC
MEC for Economic Development and Tourism	Darkie Afrika	2005	2009	ANC
MEC for Finance and Economic Development	Darkie Afrika	2004	2005	ANC
MEC for Health	Nomonde Rasmeni	2005	2009	ANC
MEC for Health	Mandlenkosi Mayisela	2004	2005	ANC
MEC for Education	Johannes Tselapedi	2004	2009	ANC
MEC for Agriculture, Conservation and Environment	Jan Serfontein	2007	2009	ANC
MEC for Agriculture, Conservation and Environment	Mandlenkosi Mayisela	2005	2007	ANC
MEC for Agriculture, Conservation, Environment and Tourism	Ndleleni Duma	2004	2005	ANC
MEC for Public Works	Jerry Thibedi	2007	2009	ANC
MEC for Public Works	Howard Yawa	2004	2007	ANC
MEC for Roads, Transport and Safety	Frans Vilakazi	2007	2009	ANC
MEC for Roads, Transport and Safety	Jerry Thibedi	2005	2007	ANC
MEC for Transport and Roads	Jerry Thibedi	2004	2005	ANC
MEC for Safety and Liaison	Maureen Modiselle	2004	2005	ANC
MEC for Local Government and Housing	Howard Yawa	2007	2009	ANC
MEC for Local Government and Housing	Frans Vilakazi	2004	2007	ANC
MEC for Social Development	Nikiwe Num-Mangqo	2005	2009	ANC
MEC for Social Development	Nomonde Rasmeni	2004	2005	ANC
MEC for Sports, Arts and Culture	Ndleleni Duma	2005	2009	ANC
MEC for Sports, Arts and Culture	Nikiwe Num-Mangqo	2004	2005	ANC

== Modiselle premiership: 2009–2010 ==
Maureen Modiselle took office as Premier after the 2009 general election and announced her new Executive Council on 8 May 2009, with some adjustments to the configuration of portfolios. The entire Executive Council remained in office throughout Modiselle's brief tenure in office, with one exception: on 16 August 2010, Modiselle sacked Grace Pampiri-Bothman, the MEC for Sports, Arts and Culture, "for defiance and showing disrespect and disdain" to the office of the Premier. The MEC for Finance, Louisa Mabe, took on Pampiri-Bothman's portfolio in an acting capacity.

North West Executive Council 2009–2010
Position	Member	Term		Party
Premier of the North West	Maureen Modiselle	2009	2010	ANC
MEC for Finance	Louisa Mabe	2009	2010	ANC
MEC for Health and Social Development	Rebecca Kasienyane	2009	2010	ANC
MEC for Education	Johannes Tselapedi	2009	2010	ANC
MEC for Economic Development and Tourism	Wendy Matsemela	2009	2010	ANC
MEC for Agriculture, Conservation, Environment and Rural Development	Boitumelo Tshwene	2009	2010	ANC
MEC for Public Works, Roads and Transport	Mahlakeng Mahlakeng	2009	2010	ANC
MEC for Housing	Desbo Mohono	2009	2010	ANC
MEC for Public Safety	Howard Yawa	2009	2010	ANC
MEC for Local Government and Traditional Affairs	Gordon Kegakilwe	2009	2010	ANC
MEC for Sports, Arts and Culture	Position vacant			
MEC for Sports, Arts and Culture	Grace Pampiri-Bothman	2009	2010	ANC

== Modise premiership: 2010–2014 ==
In November 2010, Thandi Modise was sworn in as Premier, after the ANC asked the incumbent, Maureen Modiselle, to resign; a week later, on 25 November 2010, she announced a major reshuffle of the Executive Council, firing five of Modiselle's MECs and filling an existing vacancy in the sports, arts and culture portfolio. She also reconfigured several portfolios, including by removing the social development portfolio from its earlier location in the health ministry and merging it with the new portfolio of women, children and people with disabilities. On 3 May 2012, she announced another major reshuffle, in which three MECs were fired and others changed portfolios; only two MECs were retained in the same positions (Magome Masike as MEC for Health and Mosetsanagape Mokomele-Mothibi as MEC for Social Development, Women, Children and People with Disabilities).

On 27 June 2013, Modise fired and replaced three MECs who had been implicated in misconduct: Louisa Mabe, then MEC for Education and Training, had been implicated in procurement irregularities; China Dodovu, who had been appointed MEC for Local Government and Traditional Affairs in 2012, was facing a conspiracy to murder charge; and Social Development MEC Mokomele-Mothibi was being investigated for abusing the privileges of her office. Modise said that none of the fired MECs had been found guilty of wrongdoing but that their removal was "aimed at faster delivery and eliminating the need for us to answer for hang-ups".

North West Executive Council 2009–2010
Position	Member	Term		Party
Premier of the North West	Thandi Modise	2010	2014	ANC
MEC for Finance	Paul Sebegoe	2012	2014	ANC
MEC for Finance	Louisa Mabe	2010	2012	ANC
MEC for Health	Magome Masike	2010	2014	ANC
MEC for Health and Social Development	Rebecca Kasienyane	2010	2010	ANC
MEC for Education and Training	Wendy Matsemela	2013	2014	ANC
MEC for Education and Training	Louisa Mabe	2012	2013	ANC
MEC for Education and Training	Raymond Elisha	2010	2012	ANC
MEC for Education and Training	Johannes Tselapedi	2010	2010	ANC
MEC for Economic Development, Environment, Conservation and Tourism	Motlalepula Rosho	2012	2014	ANC
MEC for Economic Development, Environment, Conservation and Tourism	Tebogo Modise	2010	2012	ANC
MEC for Economic Development and Tourism	Wendy Matsemela	2010	2010	ANC
MEC for Agriculture and Rural Development	Desbo Mohono	2012	2014	ANC
MEC for Agriculture and Rural Development	Boitumelo Tshwene	2010	2012	ANC
MEC for Agriculture, Conservation, Environment and Rural Development	Boitumelo Tshwene	2010	2010	ANC
MEC for Public Works, Roads and Transport	Raymond Elisha	2012	2014	ANC
MEC for Public Works, Roads and Transport	Mahlakeng Mahlakeng	2010	2012	ANC
MEC for Human Settlements, Safety and Liaison	Nono Maloyi	2012	2014	ANC
MEC for Human Settlements, Safety and Liaison	Desbo Mohono	2010	2012	ANC
MEC for Housing	Desbo Mohono	2010	2010	ANC
MEC for Public Safety	Howard Yawa	2010	2010	ANC
MEC for Local Government and Traditional Affairs	Manketsi Tlhape	2013	2014	ANC
MEC for Local Government and Traditional Affairs	China Dodovu	2012	2013	ANC
MEC for Local Government and Traditional Affairs	Paul Sebegoe	2010	2012	ANC
MEC for Local Government and Traditional Affairs	Gordon Kegakilwe	2010	2010	ANC
MEC for Social Development, Women, Children and People with Disabilities	Collen Maine	2013	2014	ANC
MEC for Social Development, Women, Children and People with Disabilities	Mosetsanagape Mokomele-Mothibi	2010	2013	ANC
MEC for Sports, Arts and Culture	Tebogo Modise	2012	2014	ANC
MEC for Sports, Arts and Culture	Hlomane Chauke	2010	2012	ANC

== Mahumapelo premiership: 2014–2018 ==
Pursuant to the May 2014 general election, Supra Mahumapelo was elected Premier of the North West and announced his Executive Council. Ontlametse Mochware was appointed MEC for Social Development but resigned almost immediately due to a legal technicality; she was replaced by Fenny Gaolaolwe.

On 8 May 2016, Mahumapelo announced a reshuffle in which he sacked two MECs – Gaoage Saliva Molapisi and Wendy Matsemela – and filled two vacancies, one left by the resignation of Collen Maine after his election as ANC Youth League President in 2015, and the other left by the resignation of Tebogo Modise, who became Mayor of Ratlou Local Municipality after the 2016 local government elections. On 8 August 2017, he announced appointments to fill two further vacancies: Public Works and Roads MEC Madoda Sambatha had been sacked in June of that year amid a land sale controversy, while Social Development MEC Kgakgamatso Nkewu had died in a car accident in July 2016.

North West Executive Council 2014–2018
Position	Member	Term		Party
Premier of the North West	Supra Mahumapelo	2014	2018	ANC
MEC for Finance and Enterprise Development	Wendy Nelson	2014	2018	ANC
MEC for Health	Magome Masike	2014	2018	ANC
MEC for Education and Sports Development	Sello Lehari	2016	2018	ANC
MEC for Education and Sports Development	Wendy Matsemela	2014	2016	ANC
MEC for Tourism	Desbo Mohono	2014	2018	ANC
MEC for Rural, Environmental and Agricultural Development	Manketsi Tlhape	2014	2018	ANC
MEC for Public Works and Roads	Mmule Johanna Maluleke	2017	2018	ANC
MEC for Public Works and Roads	Madoda Sambatha	2014	2017	ANC
MEC for Community Safety and Transport Management	Mpho Motlhabane	2016	2018	ANC
MEC for Community Safety and Transport Management	Gaoage Saliva Molapisi	2014	2016	ANC
MEC for Local Government and Human Settlement	Fenny Gaolaolwe	2016	2018	ANC
MEC for Local Government and Human Settlement	Collen Maine	2014	2015	ANC
MEC for Social Development	Hoffman Galeng	2017	2018	ANC
MEC for Social Development	Kgakgamatso Nkewu	2016	2016	ANC
MEC for Social Development	Fenny Gaolaolwe	2014	2016	ANC
MEC for Social Development	Ontlametse Mochware	2014	2014	ANC
MEC for Culture, Arts and Traditional Affairs	Ontlametse Mochware	2016	2018	ANC
MEC for Culture, Arts and Traditional Affairs	Tebogo Modise	2014	2016	ANC

== Mokgoro premiership ==
=== First term: 2018–2019 ===
Job Mokgoro was sworn in as Premier in June 2018 after Supra Mahumapelo was forced to resign; he preserved the composition of Mahumapelo's Executive Council until 6 December 2018, when he announced a reshuffle in which four MECs were fired and several others changed portfolios.

North West Executive Council 2018–2019
Position	Member	Term		Party
Premier of the North West	Job Mokgoro	2018	2019	ANC
MEC for Finance, Economy and Enterprise Development	Wendy Matsemela	2018	2019	ANC
MEC for Finance, Economy and Enterprise Development	Wendy Nelson	2018	2018	ANC
MEC for Health	Madoda Sambatha	2018	2019	ANC
MEC for Health	Magome Masike	2018	2018	ANC
MEC for Education and Sports Development	Sello Lehari	2018	2019	ANC
MEC for Tourism	Wendy Nelson	2018	2019	ANC
MEC for Tourism	Desbo Mohono	2018	2018	ANC
MEC for Rural, Environmental and Agricultural Development	Desbo Mohono	2018	2019	ANC
MEC for Rural, Environmental and Agricultural Development	Manketsi Tlhape	2018	2018	ANC
MEC for Public Works and Roads	Gaoage Saliva Molapisi	2018	2019	ANC
MEC for Public Works and Roads	Mmule Johanna Maluleke	2018	2018	ANC
MEC for Community Safety and Transport Management	Mpho Motlhabane	2018	2019	ANC
MEC for Local Government and Human Settlement	Motlalepula Rosho	2018	2019	ANC
MEC for Local Government and Human Settlement	Fenny Gaolaolwe	2018	2018	ANC
MEC for Social Development	Fenny Gaolaolwe	2018	2019	ANC
MEC for Social Development	Hoffman Galeng	2018	2018	ANC
MEC for Culture, Arts and Traditional Affairs	Ontlametse Mochware	2018	2019	ANC

=== Second term: 2019–2021 ===
Mokgoro was elected to his first full term as Premier in the 2019 general election and announced his new Executive Council on 28 May 2019, including reconfigurations of several portfolios. Mmoloki Cwaile was appointed MEC for Cooperative Governance, Human Settlements and Traditional Affairs in November 2020 following the death of the incumbent, Gordon Kegakilwe, from COVID-19-related illness; however, Cwaile was sacked in August 2021 and replaced by Lenah Miga.

North West Executive Council 2019–2021
Position	Member	Term		Party
Premier of the North West	Job Mokgoro	2019	2021	ANC
MEC for Finance	Motlalepula Rosho	2019	2021	ANC
MEC for Health	Madoda Sambatha	2019	2021	ANC
MEC for Education	Wendy Matsemela	2019	2021	ANC
MEC for Economic Development, Environment and Tourism	Kenetswe Mosenogi	2019	2021	ANC
MEC for Agriculture and Rural Development	Desbo Mohono	2019	2021	ANC
MEC for Public Works and Roads	Gaoage Saliva Molapisi	2019	2021	ANC
MEC for Community Safety and Transport Management	Sello Lehari	2019	2021	ANC
MEC for Cooperative Governance, Human Settlement and Traditional Affairs	Lenah Miga	2021	2021	ANC
MEC for Cooperative Governance, Human Settlement and Traditional Affairs	Mmoloki Cwaile	2020	2021	ANC
MEC for Cooperative Governance, Human Settlement and Traditional Affairs	Gordon Kegakilwe	2019	2020	ANC
MEC for Social Development	Boitumelo Moiloa	2019	2021	ANC
MEC for Arts, Culture, Sports and Recreation	Tsotso Tlhapi	2019	2021	ANC

== Maape premiership: 2021–2024 ==
In September 2021, Bushy Maape was sworn in to replace Job Mokgoro as Premier. Maape initially preserved Mokgoro's Executive Council, but on 21 November 2022 he announced a reshuffle in which Lenah Miga was fired and replaced by Nono Maloyi, while Kenetswe Mosenogi and Tsotso Tlhapi swopped portfolios. On 7 December that year, Viola Motsumi replaced Wendy Matsemela as MEC for Education. On 11 July 2023, acting premier Nono Maloyi fired Boitumelo Moiloa as Social Development MEC and replaced her with Lazarus Mokgosi.

North West Executive Council 2021–2024
Position	Member	Term		Party
Premier of the North West	Bushy Maape	2021	2024	ANC
MEC for Finance	Motlalepula Rosho	2021	2024	ANC
MEC for Health	Madoda Sambatha	2021	2024	ANC
MEC for Education	Viola Motsumi	2022	2024	ANC
MEC for Education	Wendy Matsemela	2021	2022	ANC
MEC for Economic Development, Environment and Tourism	Tsotso Tlhapi	2022	2024	ANC
MEC for Economic Development, Environment and Tourism	Kenetswe Mosenogi	2021	2022	ANC
MEC for Agriculture and Rural Development	Desbo Mohono	2021	2024	ANC
MEC for Public Works and Roads	Gaoage Saliva Molapisi	2021	2024	ANC
MEC for Community Safety and Transport Management	Sello Lehari	2021	2024	ANC
MEC for Cooperative Governance, Human Settlement and Traditional Affairs	Nono Maloyi	2022	2024	ANC
MEC for Cooperative Governance, Human Settlement and Traditional Affairs	Lenah Miga	2021	2022	ANC
MEC for Social Development	Lazarus Mokgosi	2023	2024	ANC
MEC for Social Development	Boitumelo Moiloa	2021	2023	ANC
MEC for Arts, Culture, Sports and Recreation	Kenetswe Mosenogi	2022	2024	ANC
MEC for Arts, Culture, Sports and Recreation	Tsotso Tlhapi	2021	2022	ANC

== Mokgosi premiership: 2024–present ==
Following the 2024 general election, Lazarus Mokgosi was elected as the new Premier of the North West. He named his executive council on 20 June, which did not include ANC provincial chairman Nono Maloyi but did include former ANC Youth League president Collen Maine as the MEC for Arts, Culture, Sports and Recreation. The newly appointed MECs were sworn in the next day. In September 2024, Collen Maine was sacked as the MEC for Arts, Culture, Sports and Recreation to make way for a female replacement, in line with the ANC's national policy of 60% of members of provincial executive councils must be women. Maine was succeeded by Tsptso Tlhapi.

North West Executive Council 2024–present
Position	Member	Term		Party
Premier of the North West	Lazarus Mokgosi	2024	Incumbent	ANC
MEC for Agriculture and Rural Development	Madoda Sambatha	2024	Incumbent	ANC
MEC for Arts, Culture, Sports and Recreation	Tsotso Tlhapi	2024	Incumbent	ANC
MEC for Arts, Culture, Sports and Recreation	Collen Maine	2024	2024	ANC
MEC for Community Safety and Transport Management	Wessels Morweng	2024	Incumbent	ANC
MEC for Cooperative Governance, Human Settlement and Traditional Affairs	Saliva Molapisi	2024	Incumbent	ANC
MEC for Economic Development, Environment, Conservation and Tourism	Bitsa Lenkopane	2024	Incumbent	ANC
MEC for Education	Viola Motsumi	2024	Incumbent	ANC
MEC for Finance	Kenetswe Mosenogi	2024	Incumbent	ANC
MEC for Health	Sello Lehari	2024	Incumbent	ANC
MEC for Public Works and Roads	Elizabeth Mokua	2024	Incumbent	ANC
MEC for Social Development	Sussana Dantjie	2024	Incumbent	ANC
