= Bitsa Lenkopane =

South African politician (born 1975)

Bitsa Lenkopane MPL

Member of the North West Provincial Legislature
- Incumbent
- Assumed office 22 May 2019

Personal details
- Born: 29 September 1975 (age 51)
- Citizenship: South Africa
- Party: African National Congress

Keobiditse Evelyn Bitsa Lenkopane (born 29 September 1975) is a South African politician who has represented the African National Congress (ANC) in the North West Provincial Legislature since 2019. She was formerly the Mayor of Kagisano–Molopo Local Municipality until she was removed by a motion of no confidence in July 2018.

Lenkopane has also served as Provincial Secretary of the North West branch of the ANC Women's League and as Regional Chairperson of the ANC's Dr Ruth Segomotsi Mompati branch. She was a political ally of former North West Premier Supra Mahumapelo.

== Mayor of Kagisano Molopo ==
In March 2018, while Lenkopane was Mayor of Kagisano–Molopo, the Ganyesa Magistrate's Court found her guilty of assaulting Boipelo Bareng, a ward councillor representing the opposition Economic Freedom Fighters. She was sentenced to pay a fine of R5,000 or serve six months' imprisonment but her sentence was suspended for three years. On 13 July that year, the council removed her as mayor through a motion of no confidence; the ANC's Moses Olaotswe was sworn in to replace her. The ANC said that her removal was intended to restore public confidence in the party and improve service delivery.

By the time of her removal from the mayoral office, Lenkopane was the Provincial Secretary of the North West branch of the ANC Women's League. In addition, a week after her removal, she was elected Regional Chairperson of the ANC's branch in Dr Ruth Segomotsi Mompati District. Her election took place under controversial circumstances; critics, including Mmoloki Cwaile, alleged that Supra Mahumapelo had interfered in the electoral process to prevent his opponents from participating. Mahumapelo was then the Provincial Chairperson of the North West ANC and had recently been removed as North West Premier.

Almost a year after her removal as mayor, in May 2019, Lenkopane was charged in the Ganyesa Magistrate's Court in relation to her conduct while mayor. She was accused of using a municipal vehicle without authorisation; while using the vehicle in 2018, she had reportedly been involved in a car accident in which her domestic worker died.

== Member of the Provincial Legislature ==
Lenkopane stood in a candidate in the 2019 general election, ranked 11th on the ANC's provincial party list for the North West. Lenkopane said that the ANC's internal vetting process had cleared her to stand as a candidate despite her criminal record – the 2018 assault conviction and a separate fraud conviction, in addition to the ongoing trial in Ganyesa. However, in mid-March, the national ANC said that her inclusion on the party list was the result of "human error" and that she would be removed due to her criminal record. Lenkopane nonetheless remained on the ANC's list and was elected as a Member of the North West Provincial Legislature.

=== Disciplinary charges ===
In January 2021, Lenkopane and four other ANC legislators were accused of colluding with opposition parties during a sitting in which Priscilla Williams was elected the Chairperson of Committees in the provincial legislature. Williams was elected to the position after narrowly beating Lenah Miga, the ANC's favoured candidate, in a secret ballot. Lenkopane and four other members of the ANC caucus – Williams, Aaron Motswana, Job Dliso, and Job Mokgoro – were accused of voting in favour of conducting the election by secret ballot, in defiance of an instruction from the party, via Chief Whip Paul Sebegoe, to support an open ballot. On 31 January, the party announced that Lenkopane and the four others would have their party membership suspended, pending a disciplinary inquiry. However, their membership was reinstated when the party leadership failed to serve disciplinary charges against them within the timelines set out in the party constitution.

Later that year, Lenkopane faced internal disciplinary charges again when she and Mahumapelo were accused of sowing division in the party. They were charged with undermining the authority of the interim leadership corps that had replaced Mahumapelo at the head of the North West ANC in 2018; among other things, they had allegedly organised a parallel political rally metres away from an official ANC event during a by-election in 2020. In April, the provincial ANC's internal disciplinary committee, chaired by Wendy Matsemela, found them both guilty of misconduct. They were both suspended from the party for five years and the party said that they would be removed as ANC public representatives. In addition, Lenkopane was instructed to undergo a five-year course of political mentorship under ANC veteran Barbara Masekela, while Mahumapelo would undergo a three-year course under former President Thabo Mbeki. Lenkopane said that she would appeal the decision, and in September 2021 the decision was overturned by the disciplinary committee of the national ANC, chaired by Nocawe Mafu. The national committee said that the disciplinary process had not been "properly ventilated at the provincial level" and instructed the party to re-run it.

=== Party offices ===
In January 2022, the Provincial Secretary of the ANC Women's League in the North West, Bridgette Tlhomelang, was suspended from her office pending an investigation into fraud allegations; Lenkopane became acting Provincial Secretary. Later that year, the league's entire provincial leadership corps was disbanded, ending Lenkopane's secretarial term; however, in August, she was appointed as the convenor of an interim task team that was installed to lead the provincial league until it held fresh leadership elections. Her appointment was opposed by critics who claimed that she had a factional agenda and was aligned to Lindiwe Sisulu and other so-called "RET forces".

Less than a fortnight later, at the ANC's provincial elective conference, Lenkopane was nominated to stand for election as Deputy Provincial Secretary of the mainstream ANC in the North West, running against Viola Motsumi and Motlalepula Rosho. Motsumi was elected to the position.

=== Provincial government ===
Following the 2024 general election, Lenkopane was appointed by the newly elected premier Lazarus Mokgosi to serve in the Executive Council as the MEC for Economic Development, Environment, Conservation and Tourism.
