= China Dodovu =

South African politician (born 1969)

The Honourable China Dodovu MP

Delegate to the National Council of Provinces
- Incumbent
- Assumed office 23 May 2019

Member of the North West Executive Council for Local Government and Traditional Affairs
- In office May 2012 – June 2013
- Premier: Thandi Modise
- Preceded by: Paul Sebegoe
- Succeeded by: Manketsi Tlhape

Deputy Provincial Chairperson of the African National Congress in the North West
- In office February 2011 – February 2015
- Chairperson: Supra Mahumapelo
- Preceded by: Molefi Sefularo
- Succeeded by: Sello Lehari

Personal details
- Born: 12 July 1969 (age 57)
- Citizenship: South Africa
- Party: African National Congress

Thamsanqa Simon China Dodovu (born 12 July 1969) is a South African politician who is currently serving as a Delegate to the National Council of Provinces since May 2019. He was formerly the Mayor of Klerksdorp's Matlosana Local Municipality and served as the Member of the Executive Council (MEC) for Local Government and Traditional Affairs in the North West provincial government from May 2012 until June 2013. Dodovu is a member of the African National Congress and served as the party's Deputy Provincial Chairperson in the North West from 2011 to 2015.

== Education and early career ==
Dodovu has a Master's degree in public administration from the University of Stellenbosch and a Master of Science in urban housing management from Sweden's University of Lund. In the 1990s, he joined the regional leadership of his political party, the African National Congress (ANC), in the newly constituted North West province. He served as a Member of Parliament from 2004 to 2006.

By 2007, he was the Executive Mayor of the City of Matlosana Local Municipality in Klerksdorp, as well as the Regional Chairperson of the ANC's branch in the Dr Kenneth Kaunda District Municipality. Sources told the Daily Maverick that he was one of several provincial ANC leaders who opposed the leadership of Premier Maureen Modiselle. On the national political stage, he was viewed as politically aligned to ANC presidential challenger Jacob Zuma ahead of the ANC's hotly contested 52nd National Conference in December 2007. In May 2008, at a chaotic party elective conference, Dodovu – at the time still Matlosana mayor – was viewed as the leader of a slate of candidates which unsuccessfully battled Supra Mahumapelo and his supporters for top leadership positions in the ANC's North West provincial branch.

== Provincial political career ==
=== ANC Deputy Chair: 2011–2015 ===
Ahead of the ANC's next provincial elective conference, Dodovu campaigned as the running mate of his former rival, outgoing ANC Provincial Secretary Supra Mahumapelo. On 12 February 2011, he was elected to a four-year term as Deputy Provincial Chairperson of the ANC in the North West, receiving a resounding 520 votes against the 203 votes received by his opponent, Moeti Moilwa. Mahumapelo also won election as Provincial Chairperson, though in later years the Daily Maverick reported that Dodovu and Mahumapelo did not have a good relationship. According to the Mail & Guardian, Dodovu supported Kgalema Motlanthe's unsuccessful bid to unseat Jacob Zuma at the party's 53rd National Conference in 2012.

=== Executive Council: 2012–2013 ===
On 3 May 2012, Dodovu was appointed to the North West Executive Council in a cabinet reshuffle by the incumbent Premier of the North West, Thandi Modise. He was appointed Member of the Executive Council (MEC) for Local Government and Traditional Affairs, succeeding Paul Sebegoe.

=== Murder trial: 2013–2014 ===
On 25 February 2013, Dodovu was arrested at his office in Potchefstroom in connection with the murder of David Chika, the regional secretary of the ANC's Dr Kenneth Kaunda regional branch. Chika had been shot dead in his driveway in Klerksdorp in December 2012, shortly before the national ANC conference; according to the Mail & Guardian, he had been accused by anti-Zuma ANC leaders in the North West of interfering with party administrative processes in a manner which had boosted the strength of pro-Zuma delegates to the national conference. Dodovu was arrested along with seven other suspects, including other local ANC politicians, on suspicion of conspiracy to commit murder.

In March 2013, Dodovu and his co-accused were charged, each with two counts of conspiracy to murder and one count of murder, and released on bail. Shortly afterwards, the North West ANC suspended Dodovu as Provincial Deputy Chairperson, pending the completion of the trial. Premier Modise initially supported Dodovu, saying that she was assured that he would cooperate with the investigation and that he should be considered innocent until proven guilty. However, in June 2013, Modise sacked Dodovu as MEC, emphasising that he had not been found guilty but that his removal was "aimed at faster delivery and eliminating the need for us to answer for hang-ups"; he was succeeded by Manketsi Tlhape. Dodovu remained an ordinary Member of the Provincial Legislature until the 2014 general election, which occurred in the middle of his trial, but he did not stand for re-election to his seat.

Throughout his trial, Dodovu maintained his innocence and alleged that the charges against him were politically motivated. His supporters linked his prosecution to his opposition to Zuma at the ANC's 53rd National Conference, as well as to what they described as a campaign by Mahumapelo to consolidate power in the North West ANC and government. Dodovu also alleged in court papers that he was being targeted because he had uncovered financial mismanagement in the Matlosana Local Municipality.

Dodovu was acquitted in November 2014. In the aftermath of the trial, he was expected to contest for re-election as ANC Deputy Provincial Chairperson on a slate of candidates opposed to Mahumapelo and headed by Nono Maloyi. However, at the next ANC provincial elective conference in February 2015 in Mafikeng, Sello Lehari was elected unopposed as Dodovu's successor.

== National Council of Provinces: 2019–2023 ==
In the 2019 general election, Dodovu was ranked 13th on the ANC's regional party list for the North West and was elected as a Delegate to the National Council of Provinces (NCOP), the upper house of the South African Parliament. In June 2019, he was elected Chairperson of the NCOP's Select Committee on Cooperative Governance and Traditional Affairs, Water and Sanitation and Human Settlements.

Simultaneously, he became Chairperson of Parliament's Ad Hoc Committee on North West Intervention after being elected unopposed to the position on 29 January 2021. The committee was established to oversee the national government's intervention in the North West province, which in May 2018 had been placed under national administration in terms of Section 100 of the South African Constitution. Former Premier Mahumapelo wrote to the NCOP's Chairperson, Amos Masondo, to object to Dodovu's appointment, claiming that Dodovu had been part of an anti-Mahumapelo campaign in the North West and therefore could not be trusted to lead the committee without bias. As chairperson Dodovu also clashed with Mahumapelo's successor, Premier Job Mokgoro. He remained chairperson of the committee as of February 2022, when the committee recommended that the Section 100 intervention should be lifted.

== Personal life ==
As of December 2007, he was married to Madimabe Dodovu.
