= Sello Lehari =

South African politician (born 1969)

Sello Lehari MPL

Member of the North West Executive Council for Health
- Incumbent
- Assumed office 21 June 2024
- Premier: Lazarus Mokgosi
- Preceded by: Madoda Sambatha

Member of the North West Executive Council for Community Safety and Transport Management
- In office 28 May 2019 – 14 June 2024
- Premier: Job Mokgoro; Bushy Maape
- Preceded by: Mpho Motlhabane

Member of the North West Executive Council for Education and Sport Development
- In office May 2016 – 28 May 2019
- Premier: Supra Mahumapelo; Job Mokgoro
- Preceded by: Wendy Matsemela
- Succeeded by: Wendy Matsemela (for Education)

Personal details
- Born: 22 February 1969 (age 57)
- Citizenship: South Africa
- Party: African National Congress

Jonas Sello Lehari (born 22 February 1969) is a South African politician who is currently serving as Member of the Executive Council (MEC) for Health in the North West. He formerly served as MEC for Community Safety and transport Management from May 2019 until June 2024, as MEC for Education and Sports Development from May 2016 to May 2019, and before that as Mayor of Moretele Local Municipality. In August 2022, he was additionally elected Provincial Treasurer of the North West branch of his political party, the African National Congress (ANC).

== Life and career ==
Lehari was born on 22 February and grew up in Moeka, a village near Moretele in present-day North West province. His father was Amos Lehari (died August 2022). By 2015, Lehari was the Mayor of Moretele Local Municipality and the Regional Chairperson of the ANC's branch in Bojanala.

In February 2015, at an ANC elective conference in Mahikeng, he was elected as Deputy Provincial Chairperson of the ANC's North West branch, serving under Supra Mahumapelo. China Dodovu had been expected to contest the position, on an opposing slate of candidates aligned to Mahumapelo's rival Nono Maloyi, but Lehari was ultimately elected unopposed. The Mail & Guardian said that Lehari was viewed as a close political ally of Mahumapelo, and critics accused Lehari of interfering improperly in the ANC's process for selecting election candidates ahead of the 2016 local government elections, an accusation denied by Lehari.

On 8 May 2016, Mahumapelo, in his capacity as Premier of the North West, announced a cabinet reshuffle in which Lehari was appointed MEC for Education and Sport Development. He remained in that position throughout the rest of Mahumapelo's term in office and into the term of Premier Job Mokgoro. In 2017, his house in Moeka was burned down when a protest about access to clean water turned violent.

Lehari's term as ANC Deputy Provincial Chairperson ended prematurely in 2018 when the ANC National Executive Committee disbanded the entire leadership corps of the provincial party. By that time, he was viewed as a likely contender to succeed Mahumapelo as ANC Provincial Chairperson.

In the 2019 general election, Lehari was ranked fifth on the ANC's provincial party list and was elected to a seat in the North West Provincial Legislature. Pursuant to the election, on 28 May 2019, Premier Mokgoro announced his new Executive Council, in which Lehari was moved to the Community Safety and Transport Management portfolio. In August 2022 in Rustenberg, he was elected Provincial Treasurer of the North West ANC, serving under new Provincial Chairperson Nono Maloyi, whose candidacy was endorsed by Mahumapelo. Lehari won in a vote against Lenah Miga, earning 380 votes to Miga's 280.

Former North West Education MEC Sello Lehari’s successor was instructed to apologize for Lehari's conduct after Lehari was found to have falsely accused teacher Elana Barkhuizen of racism.

Sambatha was appointed as the MEC for Health following the 2024 general election.
