= Ontlametse Mochware =

South African politician

Member of the North West Executive Council for Culture, Arts and Traditional Affairs
- In office 8 May 2016 – 7 May 2019
- Premier: Supra Mahumapelo; Job Mokgoro
- Preceded by: Tebogo Modise
- Succeeded by: Position abolished

Member of the North West Provincial Legislature
- In office January 2016 – 7 May 2019

Personal details
- Born: 21 June 1960 (age 66) Gamanyai, Ganyesa; Transvaal, Union of South Africa
- Party: African National Congress

Ontlametse Regina Mochware (born 21 June 1960) is a South African politician who served as the North West's Member of the Executive Council (MEC) for Culture, Arts and Traditional Affairs from May 2016 to May 2019. She represented the African National Congress (ANC) in the North West Provincial Legislature from January 2016 until May 2019.

A former teacher and school principal, Mochware was the Mayor of Kagisano–Molopo Local Municipality from 2006 to 2014. She resigned from the mayoral office in May 2014 in order to be sworn in to the provincial legislature and to Supra Mahumapelo's North West Executive Council. However, she had not stood as a candidate in the 2014 general election, meaning that her appointment was highly irregular in terms of South African law. She therefore resigned from her new positions shortly after being sworn in to them, and thereafter she served as a political adviser to Mahumapelo until January 2016, when she officially joined the legislature.

== Early life and career ==
Mochware was born on 21 June 1960 in the village of Gamanyai near Ganyesa in present-day North West province. She has a teaching degree and a BA in education and business management. She began work as a teacher in 1980 and became a school principal in 1997. From 2000, she also served part-time as a local councillor in the North West, representing the ANC.

In 2005, Mochware resigned from her job as a principal to work in local politics full-time. The following year, she was elected as Mayor of Kagisano–Molopo Local Municipality; she served in that office for eight years, from 2006 to 2014. During her term as Mayor, she rose through the ranks of the ANC and ANC Women's League in the region.

== Irregular swearing-in: 2014 ==
At the time of the 2014 general election, Mochware was still serving as Mayor of Kagisano–Molopo and was not included on the ANC's list of candidates for election to the North West Provincial Legislature. However, shortly after the election on 23 May, Mochware was formally sworn in as a Member of the Provincial Legislature. This was apparently possible because one of the politicians elected on the ANC's list, Thandi Modise, had declined her seat in order to join the national Parliament – although Mochware's appointment was nonetheless irregular, since legislation required that Modise's seat should be filled by the next candidate on the ANC's party list. In addition, on 27 May, North West Premier Supra Mahumapelo announced that Mochware would join the North West Executive Council as Member of the Executive Council (MEC) for Social Development, an appointment for which membership in the provincial legislature was a prerequisite. She was sworn in to the Executive Council the same day.

However, later on 27 May, Mochware resigned from the provincial government. The ANC said that her resignation was the "consequence of a legal technicality in order to totally comply with the provisions of the Electoral Act". According to media reports, both opposition parties and sources were suspicious that party leaders had purposefully attempted to bypass electoral legislation in appointing Mochware. ANC sources told the Star that Mochware had been sworn in to the legislature because the seat would otherwise go to Hlomane Chauke, the next candidate on the ANC's party list; Chauke was unpopular with some party officials.

== Provincial legislature: 2016–2019 ==
After her brief stint in the legislature, Mochware was appointed as a political adviser in Mahumapelo's office, and she remained in that position from May 2014 to December 2015. In January 2016, she was officially sworn in as a Member of the Provincial Legislature, filling a casual vacancy.

On 8 May 2016, she was appointed to the North West Executive Council in a reshuffle by Mahumapelo, who named her as MEC for Culture, Arts and Traditional Affairs. In addition, in 2017, she served as acting MEC for Public Works and Roads after Madoda Sambatha was fired and before Johanna Maluleke became Sambatha's permanent replacement.

When Job Mokgoro succeeded Mahumapelo as Premier, he retained Mochware in her portfolio in the Executive Council. However, the ANC did not nominate Mochware for re-election to her legislative seat in the 2019 general election. She therefore left the legislature after the election and lost her seat in the Executive Council. Mokgoro subsequently reconfigured her old portfolio as the Department of Arts, Culture and Sports, led by Tsotso Tlhapi; responsibility for traditional affairs thereafter fell under the Department of Cooperative Governance, Human Settlements and Traditional Affairs, under Gordon Kegakilwe.

== Personal life ==
Mochware is married and has five children, three sons and two daughters. She is Christian.
