= Nikiwe Num =

South African politician (born 1973)

Member of the North West Executive Council for Social Development
- In office August 2005 – August 2008
- Premier: Edna Molewa
- Preceded by: Nomonde Rasmeni
- Succeeded by: Rebecca Kasienyane (for Health and Social Development)

Member of the North West Executive Council for Sports, Arts and Culture
- In office April 2004 – August 2005
- Premier: Edna Molewa
- Preceded by: Ontlametse Mochware
- Succeeded by: Ndleleni Duma

Deputy Provincial Secretary of the North West African National Congress
- In office May 2008 – August 2008
- Chairperson: Nono Maloyi
- Secretary: Supra Mahumapelo
- Preceded by: Ndleleni Duma
- Succeeded by: Gordon Kegakilwe

Personal details
- Born: 1 January 1973 (age 53)
- Citizenship: South Africa
- Party: African National Congress
- Other party: Congress of the People (2008–2014)

Nikiwe Julia Num (born 1 January 1973), also known as Nikiwe Mangqo, is a South African politician who has served as Mayor of the North West's Dr Kenneth Kaundra District Municipality since 2021. She formerly served in the North West Provincial Legislature, representing the African National Congress (ANC) from 2004 to 2008 and then the Congress of the People (Cope) from 2009 to 2014. She has since rejoined the ANC, which nominated her to her current office during the 2021 local elections.

A former ANC Youth League activist, Num was appointed to Edna Molewa's Executive Council after the 2004 general election. She served as the North West's Member of the Executive Council (MEC) for Sports, Arts and Culture from 2004 to 2005 and as MEC for Social Development from 2005 to 2008. In addition, she was elected as Deputy Provincial Secretary of the ANC's North West branch in May 2008. However, in August 2008, she resigned from her party and government offices and defected to Cope, a recently established breakaway party. She was firmly aligned to Mbhazima Shilowa in Cope's internal leadership struggles and led the party's caucus in the North West Provincial Legislature between 2009 and 2014, when she declined to seek re-election.

== Early life and career ==
Born on 1 January 1973, Num was active in the Congress of South African Students while in high school. She rose to political prominence through the ANC Youth League (ANCYL), initially as a regional leader of the league in the North West in the 1990s. In April 2001, she was elected national ANCYL Treasurer, serving under ANCYL President Malusi Gigaba.

== Provincial government ==
=== ANC: 2004–2008 ===
While Num was still serving as ANCYL Treasurer, she stood as a candidate in the 2004 general election and secured election to an ANC seat in the North West Provincial Legislature. After the election, on 30 April 2004, North West Premier Edna Molewa appointed to her to the North West Executive Council as MEC for Sports, Arts and Culture.

In August 2004, Num lost her bid for re-election as ANCYL Treasurer, according to the Mail & Guardian because of her association with the Young Communist League of the South African Communist Party. She also failed to gain election as an ordinary member of the ANCYL National Executive Committee. However, she continued as MEC and in a reshuffle announced on 23 August 2005, she was moved to a new portfolio as MEC for Social Development.

At a chaotic party elective conference in May 2008, Num was elected Deputy Provincial Secretary of the North West branch of the mainstream ANC. During her brief tenure in that office, she deputised Provincial Secretary Supra Mahumapelo.

=== COPE: 2009–2014 ===
On 25 August 2008, the Congress of the People (Cope) announced that Num had resigned from the ANC – and therefore from the provincial legislature – in order to join Cope, a breakaway party that had recently been established in the aftermath of the ANC's 52nd National Conference. She subsequently became Cope's candidate for election as Premier of the North West in the 2009 general election. In that capacity, she was ranked first on Cope's provincial party list in the election and she was sworn into one of the three seats that Cope won in the North West Provincial Legislature. She led the Cope caucus in the legislature throughout the five-year legislative term.

At the same time, inside the party, Num was soon identified as a political ally of Mbhazima Shilowa, Cope's deputy leader, who was increasingly seen as a potential challenger to Cope leader Mosiuoa Lekota. Amid the leadership succession battle that followed, Num was rumoured to be considering leaving Cope; according to News24, she was offered a job with the police in mid-2010. However, Num remained with Cope and in December 2010 stood on Shilowa's slate for election to the party's national leadership. That month's party elective congress devolved into chaos and split the party, with both Shilowa and Lekota claiming to be Cope's legitimately elected leaders. Num was firmly within Shilowa's camp and acted as Secretary-General for his wing of the party. In the resulting power struggle, Num was one of several Cope members whom Lekota's faction claimed first to suspend (in January 2011) and then to expel (in March 2011).

In early 2014 – by which time Shilowa had conclusively departed Cope – the Mail & Guardian said that Num was again rumoured to be in discussions about rejoining the ANC ahead of the 2014 general election. However, Num said that she would complete her term as Cope leader in the provincial legislature, because, "It's better to be kicked out by Terror [Lekota] than to desert voters who got me into this position." She did complete the legislative term in her Cope seat but did not run for re-election in May 2014.

== Local government ==
Num later rejoined the ANC and served as its provincial elections coordinator in the North West ahead of the 2019 general election. In the 2021 local elections, she was elected to represent the ANC as a local councillor in the North West's Dr Kenneth Kaunda District Municipality, where she was elected mayor. She remained in the mayoral office as of 2023.
