= Mosetsanagape Mokomele-Mothibi =

South African politician

Member of the North West Executive Council for Social Development, Women, Children and People with Disabilities
- In office 25 November 2010 – 27 June 2013
- Premier: Thandi Modise
- Preceded by: Position established
- Succeeded by: Collen Maine

Personal details
- Citizenship: South Africa
- Party: African National Congress

Mosetsanagape Margaret Mokomele-Mothibi is a South African politician who represented the African National Congress (ANC) in the North West Provincial Legislature until 2014, when she failed to gain re-election. She served as the North West's Member of the Executive Council (MEC) for Social Development, Women, Children and People with Disabilities from November 2010 to June 2013 under Premier Thandi Modise. She was fired from the Executive Council after she admitted that she had used public funds to attend the ANC's 52nd National Conference in December 2012.

== Legislative career ==
In the 2009 general election, Mokomele-Mothibi was narrowly elected to a seat in the North West Provincial Legislature, ranked 23rd on the ANC's provincial party list. On 25 November 2010, she was appointed to the North West Executive Council in a major reshuffle by Thandi Modise, who had recently replaced Maureen Modiselle as Premier of the North West. Modise appointed Mokomele-Mothibi to a newly formed portfolio as MEC for Social Development, Women, Children and People with Disabilities.

In February 2013, Mokomele-Mothibi caused a minor scandal when she admitted to the provincial legislature's Standing Committee on Public Accounts that she had used public funds to attend the ANC's 53rd National Conference in Mangaung in December 2012. She had paid over R174,000 for a friend and several government officials to attend the conference and stay in a nearby guesthouse. She apologised and promised that she would repay the full amount within a week. The Democratic Alliance called for a police investigation.

Mokomele-Mothibi's admission led to a protracted investigation into the claim that she had abused the powers of her office, and on 27 June 2013, Modise fired her from the Executive Council, saying that the government wanted to avoid having to "answer for hang-ups". Also fired were two other MECs, Louisa Mabe and China Dodovu, who had been implicated in separate incidents of misconduct. Modise emphasised that all three had "executed their tasks with distinction" and had not been found guilty of any wrongdoing.

Mokomele-Mothibi completed the rest of the legislative term as an ordinary Member of the Provincial Legislature. In the 2014 general election, she was ranked 25th on the ANC's provincial party list and failed to gain re-election to the provincial legislature.
