= Mokgoro =

Mokgoro is a surname. Notable people with the surname include:

- Job Mokgoro (born 1948), South African politician and academic
- Yvonne Mokgoro (1950–2024), South African jurist
