= Desbo Mohono =

South African politician (born 1970)

Speaker of the North West Provincial Legislature
- Incumbent
- Assumed office 14 June 2024
- Preceded by: Sussana Dantjie

Member of the North West Executive Council for Agriculture and Rural Development
- In office December 2018 – 14 June 2024
- Premier: Job Mokgoro; Bushy Maape
- Preceded by: Manketsi Tlhape
- Succeeded by: Madoda Sambatha
- In office May 2012 – May 2014
- Premier: Thandi Modise
- Preceded by: Boitumelo Tshwene
- Succeeded by: Manketsi Tlhape

Member of the North West Provincial Legislature
- Incumbent
- Assumed office 2009

Member of the North West Executive Council for Tourism
- In office May 2014 – December 2018
- Premier: Supra Mahumapelo; Job Mokgoro
- Preceded by: Motlalepula Rosho (for Economic Development, Environment, Conservation and Tourism)
- Succeeded by: Wendy Nelson

Personal details
- Born: 28 October 1970 (age 55) Chaneng, Rustenberg; Transvaal, South Africa
- Party: African National Congress
- Other political affiliations: South African Communist Party

Sebonta Desbo Mohono (born 28 October 1970) is a South African politician who is currently serving as the speaker of the North West Provincial Legislature. Since 2009, she has served continuously in the North West Provincial Legislature and the Executive Council of the North West, including as MEC for Tourism from 2014 to 2018 and as the MEC for Agriculture and Rural Development from December 2018 until June 2024.

A teacher by training, she rose to political prominence through the South African Democratic Teachers Union and Congress of South African Trade Unions. She is a member of the African National Congress and in 2022 was elected to a four-year term on the party's Provincial Executive Committee.

== Early life and career ==
Mohono was born on 28 October 1970 in the village of Chaneng near Rustenberg, now part of South Africa's North West province. She was initially schooled in that region but matriculated at Seabe High School in present-day Mpumalanga. In 1993, after completing a tertiary diploma in teaching, she began work as a teacher. While a teacher, she rose through the regional and provincial ranks of the South African Democratic Teachers Union, an affiliate of the Congress of South African Trade Unions (COSATU), and she was a member of COSATU's provincial executive in the North West from 2004 to 2009.

== Political career ==
Mohono left teaching in 2009 when she was elected as a Member of the North West Provincial Legislature, representing the African National Congress (ANC). On 8 May 2009, she was appointed to the North West Executive Council by Maureen Modiselle, the newly elected Premier of the North West; she became the province's Member of the Executive Council (MEC) for Housing. In November 2010, Modiselle was succeeded by Thandi Modise, who reconfigured and expanded Mohono's portfolio as the Department of Human Settlements, Safety and Liaison. She remained in that position until 3 May 2012, when Modise reshuffled her cabinet and made Mohono MEC for Agriculture and Rural Development.

In the 2014 general election, Mohono was re-elected to her legislative seat, ranked 13th on the ANC's party list in the North West. Supra Mahumapelo, who was elected Premier in the same election, appointed Mohono his MEC for Tourism, an office which she held for the duration of Mahumapelo's tenure in office. On 6 December 2018, Mahumapelo's successor, Job Mokgoro, announced a reshuffle in which Mohono was returned to her former portfolio, renamed for a brief period as Rural, Environmental and Agricultural Development.

In the 2019 general election, she was re-elected to a third legislative term, now ranked ninth on the ANC's party list. She remained in the same portfolio in the Executive Council, including after the election of Bushy Maape as Premier in 2022.

Following the 2024 general election, she was elected speaker of the provincial legislature.

== Party-political offices ==
In 2011 and 2022, Mohono was elected to four-year terms on the North West ANC's Provincial Executive Committee. In 2018, the national leadership of the ANC appointed her to an interim task team formed to lead the provincial party after ANC Provincial Chairperson Supra Mahumapelo was removed from his position. She is also a member of the ANC Women's League and the South African Communist Party.
