= Grace Pampiri-Bothman =

South African politician

Member of the National Assembly
- In office 2 November 2010 – 6 May 2014

Member of the North West Executive Council for Sports, Arts and Culture
- In office 8 May 2009 – 16 August 2010
- Premier: Maureen Modiselle
- Preceded by: Ndleleni Duma
- Succeeded by: Hlomane Chauke

Personal details
- Citizenship: South Africa
- Party: African National Congress
- Other political affiliations: South African Communist Party

Sizeni Grace Pampiri-Bothman is a South African politician who represented the African National Congress (ANC) in the National Assembly from November 2010 to May 2014. She has been a member of the Central Committee of the South African Communist Party (SACP) since 2012.

Before joining the National Assembly, Bothman served in the North West Provincial Legislature, where she was the North West's Member of the Executive Council (MEC) for Sports, Arts and Culture from May 2009 to August 2010. Her dismissal from the Executive Council, effected by Premier Maureen Modiselle, was highly unpopular with both the SACP and the Congress of South African Trade Unions and therefore severely undermined the ANC's relations with its Tripartite Alliance partners in the North West.

== Early political career ==
Pampiri-Bothman was formerly a prominent activist in the South African Commercial, Catering and Allied Workers Union, an affiliate of the ANC-aligned Congress of South African Trade Unions (COSATU), and she later served as a local councillor in Klerksdorp in the North West. She was also a prominent member of the South African Communist Party (SACP) in the North West.

== Legislative career ==
=== North West Executive Council: 2009–2010 ===
Pursuant to the 2009 general election, Pampiri-Bothman was elected to represent the ANC in the North West Provincial Legislature, and on 8 May 2009, North West Premier Maureen Modiselle announced that she would join the North West Executive Council as a Member of the Executive Council (MEC) for Sports, Arts and Culture. Her appointment was viewed as reflective of an intentional strategy to strengthen the Tripartite Alliance by including representatives of the SACP in the provincial executive.

On 16 August 2010, Modiselle abruptly announced that she had fired Pampiri-Bothman from the Executive Council with immediate effect, "for defiance and showing disrespect and disdain to the highest office in the province [the office of the Premier]". Modiselle said that Pampiri-Bothman's had demonstrated behaviour which could be "very detrimental and catastrophic" to service delivery and said that she was ordering an external audit to investigate allegations that Pampiri-Bothman's department had misused public funds and awarded tenders irregularly. The press statement noted that Pampiri-Bothman was the second North West MEC to be fired outright since the end of apartheid in 1994 (the other was Mmamokwena Gaoretelelwe). Finance MEC Louisa Mabe was appointed to fill her portfolio in an acting capacity.

Modiselle's office continued to imply that Pampiri-Bothman's dismissal was related to corruption or other serious misconduct, while Pampiri-Bothman's supporters claimed that she was fired because she had been intending to order her own investigation into allegations of improper tender awards in the provincial government. The provincial COSATU leadership, for example, claimed that Pampiri-Bothman had sought to investigate alleged corruption during the 2010 FIFA World Cup. COSATU claimed that Pampiri-Bothman had been removed on factional grounds and that it had been insufficiently consulted on the decision beforehand.

Likewise, though the opposition Democratic Alliance welcomed Pampiri-Bothman's dismissal, it severely increased tensions between the provincial ANC and the provincial SACP. The provincial SACP leadership viewed Pampiri-Bothman's removal as connected to a broader project of purging SACP members (notably national politician Gwede Mantashe) from leadership positions ahead of the ANC's 52nd National Conference, scheduled for December 2012.

=== National Assembly: 2010–2014 ===
After she was dismissed from the Executive Council, Pampiri-Bothman resigned from the North West Provincial Legislature, and on 2 November 2010 she was sworn into an ANC seat in the National Assembly, the lower house of the South African Parliament, where she filled a casual vacancy. She completed the legislative term in the seat but did not stand for re-election in 2014. However, during the legislative term, in 2012, Pampiri-Bothman was elected for the first time to the Central Committee of the SACP, and, even after retreating from frontline legislative politics, she remained a member of the committee, gaining re-election in 2017 and 2022.
