= Tebogo Modise =

South African politician (born 1969)

The Honourable Tebogo Modise MP

Delegate to the National Council of Provinces
- Incumbent
- Assumed office 23 May 2019

Member of the North West Executive Council for Culture, Arts and Traditional Affairs
- In office 27 May 2014 – 19 January 2016
- Premier: Supra Mahumapelo
- Preceded by: Herself (for Sports, Arts and Culture)
- Succeeded by: Ontlametse Mochware

Member of the North West Executive Council for Sports, Arts and Culture
- In office 3 May 2012 – 27 May 2014
- Premier: Thandi Modise
- Preceded by: Hlomane Chauke
- Succeeded by: Herself (for Culture, Arts and Traditional Affairs)

Member of the North West Executive Council for Sports, Arts and Culture
- In office 25 November 2010 – 3 May 2012
- Premier: Thandi Modise
- Preceded by: Wendy Matsemela
- Succeeded by: Motlalepula Rosho

Personal details
- Born: 9 July 1969 (age 57) Ratlou, North West; South Africa
- Party: African National Congress

Tebogo Constance Modise (born 9 July 1969) is a South African politician who has represented the African National Congress (ANC) in the National Council of Provinces since May 2019. She formerly served in the North West Executive Council between November 2010 and January 2016, when she resigned from the North West Provincial Legislature to become Mayor of Ratlou Local Municipality.

== Early life ==
Modise was born in Ratlou Local Municipality in the present-day North West province.

== Provincial legislature ==
Modise was elected to the North West Provincial Legislature in the 2009 general election, ranked 21st on the ANC's provincial party list. The following year, on 25 November 2010, she was appointed to the North West Executive Council in a reshuffle by Thandi Modise, who had recently replaced Maureen Modiselle as Premier of the North West. Premier Modise named her as MEC for Economic Development, Environment and Tourism. She remained in that portfolio until 3 May 2012, when, in another reshuffle, she was moved to a new post as MEC for Sports, Arts and Culture.

Modise was re-elected to her legislative seat in the 2014 general election and she was retained in the Executive Council by Thandi Modise's successor, Premier Supra Mahumapelo. Mahumapelo reconfigured Modise's portfolio, making her MEC for Culture, Arts and Traditional Affairs.

== Mayor of Ratlou: 2016–2019 ==
In January 2016, Modise announced her resignation from the Executive Council and the Provincial Legislature. A government spokesperson said that she had resigned after ANC branches had called for her removal and the ANC Provincial Executive Committee had approached the government to make the same request. On 19 January 2016, she was sworn in as Mayor of Ratlou Local Municipality, her hometown. She denied that she had been forced to accept a demotion and said that she was pleased to be back in Ratlou. She remained in the mayoral office after the 2016 local elections.

== Parliament: 2019–present ==
In the 2019 general election, Modise was elected to an ANC seat in the National Council of Provinces, the upper house of the South African Parliament.
