= Darkey Africa =

South African politician

Member of the North West Executive Council for Economic Development and Tourism
- In office August 2005 – May 2009
- Preceded by: Position established
- Succeeded by: Wendy Matsemela

Member of the National Assembly

Personal details
- Citizenship: South Africa
- Party: African National Congress

Darkey Ephraim Africa, also spelled Darkie Afrika, is a South African politician and diplomat who represented the African National Congress (ANC) in the North West Provincial Legislature until 2009. During that time, he served in the North West Executive Council under Premiers Popo Molefe and Edna Molewa. He later served as Consul-General of the South African High Commission in Nigeria.

== Legislative career ==
Africa was involved in the anti-apartheid movement. After South Africa's first democratic elections in 1994, he was elected to represent the ANC in North West Provincial Legislature and joined Premier Popo Molefe's Executive Council as Member of the Executive Council (MEC) for Local Government. Ahead of the 2004 general election, he was considered a frontrunner to succeed Molefe as Premier, but that office went to Edna Molewa, who appointed Africa as MEC for Finance and Economic Development. In a reshuffle in August 2005, Molewa added reconfigured his portfolio, adding Tourism but transferring Finance to fellow MEC Maureen Modiselle.

== Diplomatic career ==
Africa was not re-elected to the provincial legislature in the 2009 general election and instead worked at the North West Planning Commission. By early 2011, the Sowetan said that he had largely disappeared from frontline politics. According to Africa, he was designated for diplomatic service in 2015 and was initially asked to go to Portugal but preferred an African posting. By 2016 he had presented his credentials as Consul-General of the South African High Commission in Nigeria. He was succeeded by Bobby Moroe in 2022.. As of 2026, Africa serves as South African ambassador to Thailand.

== Personal life ==
Africa is married. In the past he has acted as a spokesman for the family of ANC stalwart Ruth Mompati.
