= Louisa Mabe =

South African politician (born 1959)

Member of the North West Executive Council for Education and Training
- In office 3 May 2012 – 27 June 2013
- Premier: Thandi Modise
- Preceded by: Raymond Elisha
- Succeeded by: Wendy Matsemela

Member of the North West Executive Council for Finance
- In office 8 May 2009 – 3 May 2012
- Premier: Maureen Modiselle; Thandi Modise
- Preceded by: Maureen Modiselle
- Succeeded by: Paul Sebegoe

Personal details
- Born: 6 October 1959 (age 66)
- Citizenship: South Africa
- Party: African National Congress

Louisa Lorato Mabe (born 6 October 1959) is a South African politician who served as the North West's Member of the Executive Council (MEC) for Finance from 2009 to 2012 and as MEC for Education from 2012 to 2013. Before joining the North West Provincial Legislature, she represented her party, the African National Congress (ANC), in the National Assembly from 2001 to 2009. Premier Thandi Modise fired her from the Executive Council in June 2013 after she was accused of involvement in procurement irregularities.

== Parliament: 2001–2009 ==
Mabe was born on 6 October 1959. She joined the National Assembly on 3 July 2001, filling a casual vacancy in the ANC's caucus, and was elected to a full term in the seat in the 2004 general election.

== Executive Council: 2009–2013 ==
In the 2009 general election, Mabe was elected to an ANC seat in the North West Provincial Legislature, ranked 15th on the ANC's provincial party list. After the election, on 8 May 2009, Premier Maureen Modiselle appointed Mabe to the North West Executive Council as MEC for Finance, Modiselle's own former portfolio. In addition, from August 2010 she acted as MEC for Sports, Arts and Culture after the incumbent, Grace Pampiri-Bothman, was fired for insubordination.

Modiselle resigned from office in November 2010 and was replaced as Premier by Thandi Modise, who initially retained Mabe as MEC for Finance. However, in a reshuffle announced on 3 May 2012, Modise moved Mabe to a new portfolio as MEC for Education. While Mabe was in that portfolio, there was a public controversy about a multi-million-rand contract the provincial Department of Finance had signed under her custodianship: the department had allegedly contracted a law firm owned by Mabe's personal acquaintance at an inflated price. She was harshly criticised in the provincial legislature's Standing Committee on Public Accounts, at that time chaired by Hlomane Chauke, and in June 2013 she was fired by Modise. In a statement, Modise said that Mabe's removal was not a finding of guilt against her but a pragmatic move "aimed at faster delivery and eliminating the need for us to answer for hang-ups".

Mabe did not stand for re-election to the provincial legislature in the next general election in 2014. However, in the 2021 local elections, she stood as a candidate for election to an ANC seat as proportional-representation councillor in the North West's Rustenburg Local Municipality.
