= Rebecca Kasienyane =

South African politician

Member of the North West Provincial Legislature
- In office 6 May 2009 – 21 April 2013

Member of the North West Executive Council for Health and Social Development
- In office 8 May 2009 – 25 November 2010
- Premier: Maureen Modiselle
- Preceded by: Nomonde Rasmeni (for Health)
- Succeeded by: Position abolished

Member of the National Assembly
- In office June 1999 – May 2009

Provincial Treasurer of the North West African National Congress
- In office June 2008 – July 2009
- Chairperson: Nono Maloyi
- Preceded by: Maureen Modiselle
- Succeeded by: Philly Mapulane

Personal details
- Born: 7 March 1952
- Died: 21 April 2013 (aged 61) Mahikeng, North West
- Citizenship: South Africa
- Party: African National Congress

Onewang Rebecca Kasienyane (7 March 1952 – 21 April 2013) was a South African politician who served as the North West's Member of the Executive Council (MEC) for Health and Social Development from May 2009 to November 2010. She represented the African National Congress (ANC) in the North West Provincial Legislature from May 2009 until her death in April 2013. Before that, she was a Member of the National Assembly from 1999 to 2009. She was also a prominent leader of the ANC Women's League in the North West.

== Early life and career ==
Kasienyane was born on 7 March 1952. She worked in early childhood development and was a prominent gender activist in the region that later became the North West province: she was a founding member of the Women's National Coalition and served as its provincial coordinator between 1993 and 1994. She served as an election monitor for the Independent Electoral Commission during South Africa's first democratic elections in 1994.

In addition, Kasienyane joined the ANC soon after its unbanning in 1990. From 1993, she served as the Chairperson of the ANC's branch in Lokaleng, Mafikeng and as Deputy Chairperson of the ANC Women's League (ANCWL) in the Northern Cape. She served in the Provincial Executive Committee of the ANC's Northern Cape branch from 1994 to 1996 and as Treasurer of the Bophirima regional branch from 1996 to 2001. Simultaneously, from 1995 to 1999, Kasienyane represented the ANC as a local councillor in Bophirima, later renamed as the Dr Ruth Segomotsi Mompati District Municipality.

== Legislative career ==
=== National Assembly: 1999–2009 ===
In 1999, Kasienyane joined the National Assembly, the lower house of the South African Parliament. She served two terms in her seat and chaired the Portfolio Committee on Labour during her second term. During the same period, Kasienyane continued to rise through the ranks of the ANC and ANCWL, including as a member of the ANCWL National Executive Committee from 2003 to 2007. In 2007, ahead of the party's 52nd National Conference, she accepted nomination to stand for election to the National Executive Committee of the mainstream ANC, though she was not ultimately elected. In mid-2008, however, she was elected as Provincial Treasurer of the ANC's North West branch, serving under Provincial Chairperson Nono Maloyi. She left that role prematurely, however, when the entire provincial leadership corps was disbanded by the national leadership in July 2009.

=== Provincial Legislature: 2009–2013 ===
By then, Kasienyane had left the National Assembly: in the 2009 general election, she was elected to an ANC seat in the North West Provincial Legislature, ranked fourth on the ANC's provincial party list. She was sworn in to the legislature on 6 May 2009. After the election, on 8 May, newly elected Premier Maureen Modiselle announced that Kasienyane would join the North West Executive Council as MEC for Health and Social Development. While Kasienyane was in that portfolio, her department took the controversial decision to shut down the Mmabatho College of Nursing in Maifkeng, leading the provincial branch of the Democratic Nursing Association of South Africa to call for her dismissal.

In November 2010, Thandi Modise succeeded Modiselle as Premier of the North West. The Mail & Guardian reported that the provincial ANC leadership had recommended that Kasienyane and three other MECs should be removed from their positions. Indeed, shortly after her inauguration, on 25 November 2010, Modise announced a major cabinet reshuffle which saw Kasienyane fired and her former portfolio reconfigured, with Health entrusted to Magome Masike and Social Development to Mosetsanagape Mokomela-Mothibi. Kasienyane continued to serve as an ordinary Member of the Provincial Legislature and at the time of her death was the chairperson of the legislature's Portfolio Committee on Economic Development and Tourism.

== Death ==
Kasienyane died in Bophelong Hospital in Mafikeng on 21 April 2013 after a long illness with cancer. Her funeral service was held in Taung.
