= Madoda Sambatha =

South African politician (born 1975)

Madoda Sambatha MPL

North West MEC for Agriculture and Rural Development
- Incumbent
- Assumed office 21 June 2024
- Premier: Lazarus Mokgosi
- Preceded by: Desbo Mohono

North West MEC for Health
- In office 6 December 2018 – 14 June 2024
- Premier: Bushy Maape; Job Mokgoro
- Preceded by: Magome Masike
- Succeeded by: Sello Lehari

North West MEC for Public Works and Roads
- In office 27 May 2014 – 1 June 2017
- Premier: Supra Mahumapelo
- Preceded by: Raymond Elisha
- Succeeded by: Mmule Maluleke

Member of the North West Provincial Legislature
- Incumbent
- Assumed office 21 May 2014

Personal details
- Born: Madoda Sambatha; 22 October 1975 (age 50) Kwangqondo, Engcobo, Cape Province, South Africa
- Party: African National Congress
- Other political affiliations: South African Communist Party
- Spouse: Phumza Sambatha
- Children: 5
- Profession: Politician

Madoda Sambatha (born 22 October 1975) is a South African politician serving as the North West MEC for Agriculture and Rural Development since 2024. He has served as a Member of the North West Provincial Legislature for the African National Congress (ANC) since 2014. He was the MEC for Public Works and Roads from 2014 to 2017 and the MEC for Health from 2018 until 2024. Sambatha is also the provincial secretary of the South African Communist Party (SACP).

== Early life and education ==
Sambatha was born on 22 October 1975 in Kwangqondo, Engcobo, in the Cape Province, now the Eastern Cape. He attended Sentube Junior Primary School, Tshapile Junior Secondary School and graduated from Mzikayise Dalasile Senior Secondary School in 1995.

== Political career ==
Sambatha later found employment as a mineworker at the Mponeng Gold Mine in 1996. He then joined the National Union of Mineworkers. He was involved in the politics of Gauteng and the North West. In 2000, Sambatha was elected as a councillor of the West Rand District Municipality in Gauteng. He was appointed Mayoral Committee Member for Public Safety and served in the post until 2005.

At the same time, he was elected as an ANC Youth League Regional Executive Committee member in the West Rand, before being elected as a member of the youth league's regional executive in the Dr Kenneth Kaunda Region in the North West.

In 2007, Sambatha was elected the provincial secretary of SACP.

Sambatha was elected to the North West Provincial Legislature in the 2014 general election that was held on 7 May and took office as an MPL on 21 May. Premier Supra Mahumapelo appointed him Member of the Executive Council for Roads and Public Works. He was sworn in on 27 May.

On 1 June 2017, Mahumapelo removed Sambatha from the Executive Council. Mahumapelo reasoned that allegations of Sambatha selling land illegally led to his demotion, yet his dismissal was speculated to have partisan undertones. Mmule Maluleke was appointed his successor.

In December 2018, newly elected premier Job Mokgoro named him the MEC for Health. He succeeded long-serving Magome Masike. He remained in the post following the 2019 general election.

Following the 2024 general election, Sambatha was named MEC for Agriculture and Rural Development by the newly elected premier Lazarus Mokgosi.

== Personal life ==
Sambatha is married to Phumza Sambatha; they have five children.

Political offices
Preceded by Desbo Mohono	North West MEC for Agriculture and Rural Development; 2024–present	Succeeded by Incumbent
Preceded by Magome Masike	North West MEC for Health; 2018–2024	Succeeded by Sello Lehari
Preceded by Raymond Elisha	North West MEC for Public Works and Roads; 2014–2017	Succeeded by Mmule Maluleke
