= Boitumelo Tshwene =

South African politician

Member of the North West Executive Council for Agriculture and Rural Development
- In office 25 November 2010 – 3 May 2012
- Premier: Thandi Modise
- Preceded by: Himself (for Agriculture, Conservation, Environment and Rural Development)
- Succeeded by: Desbo Mohono

Member of the North West Executive Council for Agriculture, Conservation, Environment and Rural Development
- In office 8 May 2009 – 25 November 2010
- Premier: Maureen Modiselle
- Preceded by: Jan Serfontein (for Agriculture, Conservation and Environment)
- Succeeded by: Himself (for Agriculture and Rural Development); Tebogo Modise (for Environment and Conservation)

Personal details
- Born: 1959/1960
- Died: 11 October 2015 (aged 55)
- Citizenship: South Africa
- Party: African National Congress

Boitumelo Shadrack Tshwene (died 11 October 2015) is a South African politician who represented the African National Congress (ANC) in the North West Provincial Legislature. He also served in the North West Executive Council under Premiers Maureen Modiselle and Thandi Modise from May 2009 to May 2012.

== Early life and career ==
Tshwene was born in 1959 or 1960 and was formerly a teacher by profession.

== Political career ==
He served as Majority Chief Whip in the North West Provincial Legislature and, from July 2007, as Deputy Speaker of the North West Provincial Legislature. Pursuant to the 2009 general election, in which he was ranked third on the ANC's party list, he was appointed to the North West Executive Council by Premier Maureen Modiselle, who named him as Member of the Executive Council (MEC) for Agriculture, Conservation, Environment and Rural Development.

In November 2010, Thandi Modise succeeded Modiselle as Premier; she reconfigured Tshwene's portfolio, making him MEC for Agriculture and Rural Development. On 3 May 2012, in another reshuffle, Modise fired Tshwene and two other MECs; he was replaced by Desbo Mohono. He was not re-elected to the provincial legislature in 2014.

== Death ==
Tshwene died on 11 October 2015 after collapsing at his home. President Jacob Zuma granted him a special provincial official funeral, which was held in Klerksdorp.
