= Mandlenkosi Mayisela =

South African politician

Member of the North West Executive Council for Agriculture, Conservation and Environment
- In office 23 August 2005 – July 2008
- Premier: Edna Molewa
- Preceded by: Ndleleni Duma
- Succeeded by: Boitumelo Tshwene

Member of the North West Executive Council for Health
- In office 30 April 2004 – 23 August 2005
- Premier: Edna Molewa
- Succeeded by: Nomonde Rasmeni

Personal details
- Citizenship: South Africa
- Party: African National Congress

Elliot Mandlenkosi Mayisela is a South African politician who represented the African National Congress (ANC) in the North West Provincial Legislature until 2009. He also served in the North West Executive Council from 2001 to 2007. In July 2007, the leadership of the North West ANC removed Mayisela from his position as Member of the Executive Council (MEC), apparently as a result of factional divisions which pitted Mayisela against Supra Mahumapelo's so-called Taliban grouping. The party also attempted to withdraw Mayisela from the provincial legislature, but their decision in that regard was overturned by the High Court.

== Executive Council: 2001–2007 ==
Mayisela formerly served as MEC for Social Services, Arts, Culture and Sports in the government of Premier Popo Molefe. On 30 April 2004, after the 2004 general election, he was appointed MEC for Health by Edna Molewa, who succeeded Molefe as Premier. He remained in that position until 23 August 2005, when, in a reshuffle, Molewa moved him to a new portfolio as MEC for Agriculture, Conservation and Environment.

In July 2007, the Provincial Executive Committee of the North West ANC resolved to suspend Mayisela's party membership, remove him from the Executive Council, and withdraw him from the North West Provincial Legislature. On 16 July, Mamateye Mampane was sworn in to replace him in his former legislative seat. Molewa appointed Frans Vilakazi as acting MEC for Agriculture, Conservation and Environment.

However, according to media reports, Molewa had not approved the decision to withdraw Mayisela from the legislature. Instead, his ousting was widely believed to be part of factional manoeuvring in the provincial ANC: Mayisela was associated with the so-called Mapogo faction, as was Molewa, while many in the Provincial Executive Committee belonged to Supra Mahumapelo's so-called Taliban faction. Mayisela said that he would challenge the party's decision in court, alleging that it had not been taken according to proper procedures, and the High Court ruled in his favour in May 2008, setting aside the ANC's decision to withdraw him from the provincial legislature. However, he was not re-elected to the provincial legislature in the 2009 general election.
