= Hlomane Chauke =

South African politician

Member of the North West Executive Council for Sports, Arts and Culture
- In office 25 November 2010 – 3 May 2012
- Premier: Thandi Modise
- Preceded by: Grace Pampiri-Bothman
- Succeeded by: Tebogo Modise

Personal details
- Citizenship: South Africa
- Party: African National Congress
- Other political affiliations: South African Communist Party

Hlomane Patrick Chauke is a South African politician who represented the African National Congress (ANC) in the National Assembly from 1994 to 2010 and later from 2016 to 2019. In the interim, he served in the North West Provincial Legislature from 2010 to 2014, including as the North West's Member of the Executive Council (MEC) for Sports, Arts and Culture from November 2010 to May 2012 under Premier Thandi Modise. He failed to gain re-election to the National Assembly in the 2019 general election.

== Early life and activism ==
Chauke grew up in Swartruggens in present-day North West province and he was active in anti-apartheid activism in Soweto in the 1980s. In 1990, after the ANC was unbanned by the apartheid government, he formally joined the ANC through its new branch in Jabavu, Soweto. He also joined the South African Communist Party.

== Legislative career ==
=== National Assembly: 1994–2010 ===
After South Africa's first democratic elections in 1994, Chauke represented the ANC in the Parliament of South Africa. During the first democratic Parliament, he played on Parliament's rugby team with other politicians including Bantu Holomisa and Makhenkesi Stofile. During the third democratic Parliament, he served as Chairperson of the Portfolio Committee on Home Affairs, but he lost that position after the 2009 general election and returned to his prior status as an ordinary Member of the National Assembly.

=== North West Legislature: 2010–2014 ===
In 2010, the ANC asked Chauke to leave Parliament to serve in the North West as deputy campaigns coordinator ahead of the 2011 local elections. According to the Mail & Guardian, the party asked him to "play an interventionist role" in mediating tensions in the provincial party and provincial Tripartite Alliance. Moreover, the newspaper reported that the ANC, in early November 2010, had amended its provincial electoral list to install Chauke near the top, making it likely that he would be sworn in to a seat in the North West Provincial Legislature if a casual vacancy arose.

Indeed, on 25 November 2010, newly elected North West Premier Thandi Modise announced that Chauke would join the North West Executive Council as Member of the Executive Council (MEC) for Sports, Arts and Culture. He remained in that office until 3 May 2012, when, in a reshuffle by Modise, he was fired and replaced by Tebogo Modise. After his dismissal from the Executive Council, he remained in his seat in the provincial legislature and chaired the legislature's Standing Committee on Public Accounts.

=== Return to the National Assembly: 2016–2019 ===
In the 2014 general election, Chauke was ranked 24th on the ANC's provincial party list and therefore narrowly missed election to one of the 23 seats won by the ANC in the provincial legislature. However, in the aftermath of the election, Thandi Modise declined to take up her seat in the provincial legislature, which in principle should have triggered Chauke's induction, since he was the next-ranked individual on the ANC's list. When Ontlametse Mochware was sworn in instead, in a highly irregular procedure, sources told the media that ANC officials had purposefully attempted to bypass electoral legislation in order to pre-empt Chauke's return; Chauke's activities in the public accounts portfolio had apparently made him unpopular with some officials.

Midway through the legislative term, in early 2016, Chauke was sworn in to fill a casual vacancy in the National Assembly. In May 2018, he was additionally elected to his prior role as Chairperson of the Portfolio Committee on Home Affairs, which at that time was undertaking a controversial inquiry into the naturalisation of the Gupta family. In the 2019 general election, Chauke was ranked 154th on the ANC's national list and failed to gain re-election to his legislative seat.
