= Jan Serfontein (politician, born 1944) =

South African farmer and politician

Member of the North West Executive Council for Agriculture, Conservation and Environment
- In office June 2007 – April 2009
- Premier: Edna Molewa
- Preceded by: Mandlenkosi Mayisela
- Succeeded by: Boitumelo Tshwene

Personal details
- Born: 23 May 1944 (age 81) Potchefstroom, Transvaal; Union of South Africa
- Party: African National Congress

Jan Lodewyk Hoek Serfontein (born 23 May 1944) is a South African politician and commercial farmer who represented the African National Congress (ANC) in the National Assembly from 1994 to 1997 and then in the North West Provincial Legislature from 1997 to 2009. From 2007 to 2009, he served as the North West's Member of the Executive Council (MEC) for Agriculture, Conservation and Environment under Premier Edna Molewa.

== Early life ==
Serfontein was born in Potchefstroom in the Transvaal on 23 May 1944. He matriculated in 1961 and completed a diploma in agriculture in 1963. From 1964 onwards, he worked at his family's commercial farm.

== Political career ==
In South Africa's first post-apartheid elections in 1994, he was elected to represent the ANC in the National Assembly, the lower house of the South African Parliament. He served in his seat until 1997, when he resigned to join the ANC caucus in the North West Provincial Legislature. He was re-elected to the provincial legislature in 1999 and 2004.

In June 2007, he joined the North West Executive Council when Premier Molewa appointed him as MEC for Agriculture, Conservation and Environment. He succeeded Mandlenkosi Mayisela, who had controversially been fired, and the Mail & Guardian that his appointment caused tensions in the provincial leadership of the ANC, which felt that Molewa had not sufficiently consulted them before making the announcement. He left the Executive Council and the provincial legislature after the 2009 general election.

== Chicken farming scandal ==
Serfontein's commercial farm included one of the largest chicken farms in the country, Boskop Layer Chickens. In August 2008, Beeld reported on alleged animal abuse at the farm, with a former employee claiming that the farm habitually dumped up to 70,000 male chicks in an empty cement dam each week and left them to die. Woolworths, a major chain grocery, announced that Boskop would no longer be its egg supplier, and the South African Poultry Association suspended the farm's membership pending further inquiry. However, despite the press widely reporting that Serfontein was directly implicated, the company said that Serfontein had retired and was not a shareholder or director at Boskop; instead, the farm was run by his son, also named Jan.
