= O. J. Tselapedi =

South African politician (1956–2021)

Member of the North West Executive Council for Education
- In office 30 April 2004 – 25 November 2010
- Premier: Edna Molewa; Maureen Modiselle
- Succeeded by: Raymond Elisha

Personal details
- Born: Oabetswe Johannes Tselapedi; 28 January 1956
- Died: 8 June 2021 (aged 65)
- Citizenship: South Africa
- Party: African National Congress

Oabetswe Johannes Tselapedi (28 January 1956 – 6 June 2021) was a South African politician who served in the North West Provincial Legislature. He was the second Speaker of the North West Provincial Legislature from 1999 to 2004 and then was the North West's Member of the Executive Council (MEC) for Education from April 2004 until November 2010, when he was fired by newly elected Premier Thandi Modise.

Tselapedi was a member of the African National Congress (ANC) and served as the party's Deputy Provincial Chairperson in the North West from 1996 to 1998. He was serving as a local councillor in Ngaka Modiri Molema District Municipality at the time of his death in 2021.

== Early life ==
Tselapedi was born on 28 January 1956.

== Legislative career ==
After South Africa's first post-apartheid elections in 1994, Tselapedi represented the ANC in the North West Provincial Legislature and also served in the North West Executive Council under Premier Popo Molefe. In addition, from 1996 to 1998, he deputised Molefe as Deputy Provincial Chairperson of the ANC in the North West; he unsuccessfully challenged Molefe for the chairmanship in 1998. Tselapedi, unlike Molefe, was viewed as a political supporter of Deputy President Thabo Mbeki.

Pursuant the 1999 general election, Tselapedi was re-elected to his legislative seat and was elected as Speaker of the North West Provincial Legislature. He served in that office until after the 2004 general election, when newly elected Premier Edna Molewa returned him to the Executive Council as Member of the Executive Council (MEC) for Education. The Mail & Guardian said that he was highly regarded for his management skills in that role, and Molewa's successor, Maureen Modiselle, retained him in the portfolio after the 2009 general election. However, in November 2010, Modiselle was forced to resign, and, on 25 November, newly elected Premier Thandi Modise fired Tselapedi and four others from the Executive Council, replacing Tselapedi with Raymond Elisha.

== Later career ==
In December 2011, the Sowetan reported that, since his dismissal by Modise, Tselapedi had been "quietly running his chicken farm far away from the limelight". In the same month, he was arrested by the Hawks and charged with corruption, fraud, and money laundering in connection with alleged procurement irregularities during his tenure as Education MEC. He denied the allegations.

In 2018, after North West Premier Supra Mahumapelo was compelled to resign, media reported that Tselapedi was considered a possible contender to replace him and that he had Mahumapelo's support. Tselapedi was not serving in the provincial legislature at that time, but City Press reported that the ANC had made preparations for his swearing in, including by amending its party list. The ANC's Provincial Executive Committee reportedly nominated Tselapedi as one of its three shortlisted candidates – alongside Sussana Dantjie and Manketsi Tlhape – but the National Executive Committee rejected its recommendation and asked for a new shortlist.

At the time of his death, he represented the ANC as a local councillor in the Ngaka Modiri Molema District Municipality.

== Personal life ==
Tselapedi was also a clergyman. He was married and had six children and three grandchildren.

He died on 6 June 2021 following a short illness and was buried in Mmabatho.
