= Howard Yawa =

South African politician

Member of the North West Executive Council for Public Safety
- In office 8 May 2009 – 25 November 2010
- Premier: Maureen Modiselle
- Preceded by: Frans Vilakazi (for Roads, Transport and Safety)
- Succeeded by: Desbo Mohono (for Human Settlements, Safety and Liaison)

Personal details
- Citizenship: South Africa
- Party: African National Congress

Howard Debeza Yawa was a South African politician who represented the African National Congress (ANC) in the North West Provincial Legislature and North West Executive Council. Under Premier Edna Molewa, he served as Member of the Executive Council (MEC) for Public Works from April 2004 until May 2007 and as MEC for Local Government and Housing from May 2007 until May 2009. After the 2009 general election, he served as MEC for Public Safety under Premier Maureen Modiselle. He was fired from the latter position in November 2010 by Modiselle's successor, Thandi Modise.
