= Mahlakeng Mahlakeng =

South African politician

Member of the North West Executive Council for Public Works, Roads and Transport
- In office 8 May 2009 – 3 May 2012
- Premier: Maureen Modiselle; Thandi Modise
- Preceded by: Jerry Thibedi (for Public Works); Frans Vilakazi (for Transport and Roads)
- Succeeded by: Raymond Elisha

Personal details
- Born: Raphael Leroi Mahlakeng
- Citizenship: South Africa
- Party: African National Congress

Raphael Leroi "Mahlakeng" Mahlakeng is a South African politician who represented the African National Congress (ANC) in the North West Provincial Legislature until 2019. He served in the North West Executive Council as Member of the Executive Council (MEC) for Public Works, Roads and Transport from May 2009 to May 2012 until Premiers Maureen Modiselle and Thandi Modise.

== Legislative career ==
Mahlakeng was re-elected to the North West Provincial Legislature in the 2009 general election, and on 8 May 2009, Premier Maureen Modiselle appointed him as Member of the Executive Council (MEC) for Public Works, Roads and Transport. When Thandi Modise succeeded Modiselle as Premier in November 2010, she retained Mahlakeng in the same portfolio. However, she later fired Mahlakeng in a reshuffle announced on 3 May 2012, replacing him with Raymond Elisha.

Mahlakeng continued to serve as an ordinary Member of the Provincial Legislature and he was re-elected to his legislative seat in the 2014 general election. He did not stand for re-election in 2019.
