= Frans Vilakazi =

South African politician

Member of the North West Executive Council for Roads, Transport and Safety
- In office 1 June 2007 – May 2009
- Premier: Edna Molewa
- Preceded by: Jerry Thibedi
- Succeeded by: Howard Yawa (for Public Safety); Mahlakeng Mahlakeng (for Public Works, Roads and Transport)

Member of the North West Executive Council for Local Government and Housing
- In office 30 April 2004 – 1 June 2007
- Premier: Edna Molewa
- Succeeded by: Howard Yawa

Personal details
- Citizenship: South Africa
- Party: African National Congress

Frans Phenye Vilakazi is a South African politician who represented the African National Congress (ANC) in the North West Provincial Legislature until 2009, when he did not gain re-election. He also served in the North West Executive Council: under Premier Edna Molewa, he was the North West's Member of the Executive Council (MEC) for Local Government and Housing from May 2004 and MEC for Roads, Transport and Safety from June 2007. Before that, he was MEC for Transport under Premier Popo Molefe.
