= Job Dliso =

South African politician

Job Dliso MPL

Member of the North West Provincial Legislature
- Incumbent
- Assumed office 22 May 2019

Personal details
- Born: Vuisile Joba Dliso
- Party: African National Congress
- Occupation: Member of the Provincial Legislature
- Profession: Politician; Trade unionist

Vuisile Joba Dliso, known as Job Dliso, is a South African politician and trade unionist who has served as a Member of the North West Provincial Legislature for the African National Congress since May 2019. In June 2019, he was appointed chairperson of the legislature's Standing Committee on Public Accounts.

== Political career ==
Dliso is a member of the African National Congress. He was appointed the provincial secretary of COSATU in January 2016. He succeeded Solly Phetoe, who was elected deputy secretary-general of the federation.

Dliso was nominated to the North West Provincial Legislature after the provincial election that was held on 8 May 2019. He was sworn in as an MPL on 22 May 2019. In June 2019, he was named chairperson of the Standing Committee on Public Accounts.
