= Paul Sebegoe =

South African politician

Paul Sebegoe MPL

Member of the North West Provincial Legislature
- Incumbent
- Assumed office 22 May 2019

Member of the North West Executive Council for Finance
- In office May 2012 – May 2014
- Premier: Thandi Modise
- Preceded by: Louisa Mabe
- Succeeded by: Wendy Nelson (for Finance and Enterprise Development)

Member of the North West Executive Council for Local Government and Traditional Affairs
- In office November 2010 – May 2012
- Premier: Thandi Modise
- Preceded by: Gordon Kegakilwe
- Succeeded by: China Dodovu

Personal details
- Party: African National Congress
- Other political affiliations: South African National Civic Organisation

Paul Sebegoe is a South African politician who is currently serving as Chief Whip of the Majority Party, the African National Congress (ANC), in the North West Provincial Legislature. He formerly served in the North West Executive Council from November 2010 to May 2014 during the tenure of Premier Thandi Modise.

Shortly after her election as Premier of the North West in November 2010, Modise announced a major cabinet reshuffle in which Sebegoe was appointed Member of the Executive Council (MEC) for Local Government and Traditional Affairs. He remained in that position until the next cabinet reshuffle, announced on 3 May 2012, in which he was appointed MEC for Finance. In the 2014 general election, Sebegoe was ranked 28th on the ANC's party list and lost his seat in the provincial legislature and in the Executive Council. During his hiatus from the legislature, he remained a member of the ANC and the allied South African National Civic Organisation (SANCO); by 2018, he was the Provincial Chairperson of SANCO in the North West.

In the 2019 general election, Sebegoe returned to the North West Provincial Legislature, ranked 13th on the ANC's party list. The ANC appointed him its Chief Whip in the provincial legislature. In 2022, he ran unsuccessfully for election as Deputy Provincial Chairperson of the North West ANC: at the party's provincial elective conference in August, he lost narrowly to Lazzy Mokgosi, the running mate of the winning candidate for Provincial Chairperson, Nono Maloyi. He received 311 votes against the 353 received by Mokgosi.
