= Nomonde Rasmeni =

South African politician

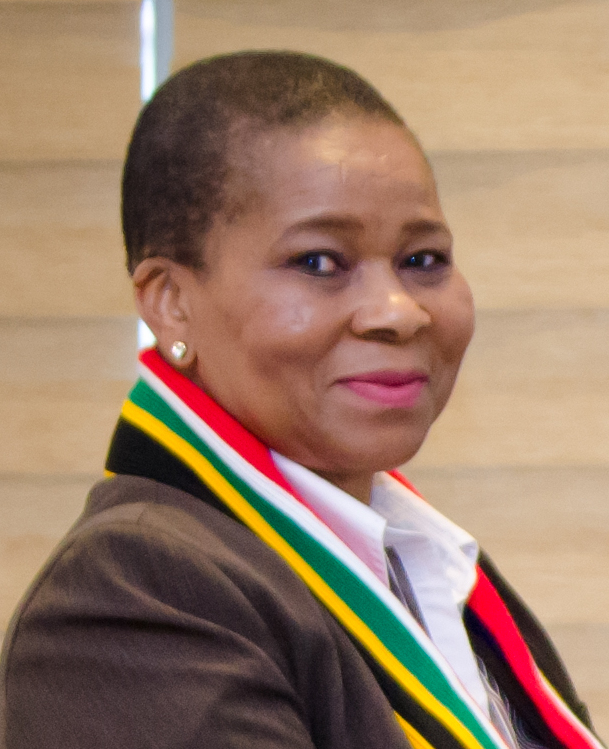
- Rasmeni in 2018

Delegate to the National Council of Provinces
- In office 7 May 2009 – 21 April 2014

Member of the North West Executive Council for Health
- In office 23 August 2005 – May 2009
- Premier: Edna Molewa
- Preceded by: Elliot Mayisela
- Succeeded by: Rebecca Kasienyane (for Health and Social Development)

Member of the North West Executive Council for Social Development
- In office 30 April 2004 – 23 August 2005
- Premier: Edna Molewa
- Succeeded by: Nikiwe Num-Mangqo

Personal details
- Born: 17 April 1957 (age 69) Cape Province, Union of South Africa
- Party: African National Congress
- Other party: South African Communist Party
- Spouse: Solly Rasmeni (m. 1981)

Rachel Nomonde Rasmeni (born 17 April 1957) is a South African politician who represented the African National Congress (ANC) in the National Council of Provinces from 2009 to 2014 and in the North West Provincial Legislature from 1994 to 2009. Under Premier Edna Molewa, she served as the North West's Member of the Executive Council (MEC) for Health from 2005 to 2009 and as MEC for Social Development from 2004 to 2005. She also served on the Central Committee of the South African Communist Party between 2007 and 2017.

== Early life ==
Rasmeni was born on 17 April 1957 in the Eastern Cape.

== Political career ==
Rasmeni represented the ANC in the North West Provincial Legislature from 1994 to 2009. From 2004 to 2009, during her third term in office, she also sat on the North West Executive Council under Premier Edna Molewa. Molewa appointed her to the Executive Council shortly after the 2004 general election, on 30 April 2004, naming her as MEC for Social Development. In a subsequent reshuffle, announced on 23 August 2005, she was moved to a new portfolio as MEC for Health. While serving in that office, in 2007, Rasmeni was elected for the first time to the Central Committee of the SACP; she ultimately served two terms on the committee, from 2007 to 2017.

In the 2009 general election, Rasmeni did not stand for re-election to the provincial legislature but instead was elected as a Permanent Delegate to the National Council of Provinces, the upper house of the South African Parliament. The ANC, which was the majority party in Parliament, nominated her to serve as chairperson of the Select Committee on Social Services. At the end of the legislative term, Rasmeni did not stand for re-election in the 2014 general election.

== Diplomatic career ==
She was South Africa's final resident ambassador to Peru between 2017 and 2021, when the embassy in Lima was permanently closed.

== Personal life ==
She married trade unionist Solly Rasmeni in 1981.
