= Priscilla Williams =

South African politician

Priscilla Williams MPL

Member of the North West Provincial Legislature
- Incumbent
- Assumed office 22 May 2019

Personal details
- Party: African National Congress
- Occupation: Member of the Provincial Legislature
- Profession: Politician

Tinah Priscilla Williams is a South African politician serving as a Member of the North West Provincial Legislature since May 2019. She represents the African National Congress. In June 2019, Williams was named chairperson of the Portfolio Committee on Social Development and Health.

== Political career ==
Williams is a member of the African National Congress. She was elected to the North West Provincial Legislature in the 2019 general election. She took office as a member on 22 May 2019.

In June 2019, she was appointed chairperson of the Portfolio Committee on Social Development and Health.
