= Ratlou Local Municipality =

Coordinates: 26°5′S 25°5′E

Ratlou
- Local municipality
- Seal

- Location in the North West
- Country: South Africa
- Province: North West
- District: Ngaka Modiri Molema
- Seat: Setlagole
- Wards: 14

Government
  - Type: Municipal council
  - Mayor: Matlhomola Jafta (African National Congress)

Area
  - Total: 4,884 km^{2} (1,886 sq mi)

Population (2011)
  - Total: 107,339
  - Density: 21.98/km^{2} (56.92/sq mi)

Racial makeup (2011)
  - Black African: 98.2%
  - Coloured: 0.7%
  - Indian/Asian: 0.2%
  - White: 0.7%

First languages (2011)
  - Tswana: 87.9%
  - Sotho: 3.7%
  - English: 2.0%
  - Xhosa: 1.9%
  - Other: 4.5%
- Time zone: UTC+2 (SAST)
- Municipal code: NW381

Ratlou Municipality (Tswana: Mmasepala wa Ratlou), formerly Setla-Kgobi Municipality, is a local municipality within the Ngaka Modiri Molema District Municipality, in the North West province of South Africa.

== Main places ==
The 2001 census divided the municipality into the following main places:

Place	Code	Area (km^{2})	Population	Most spoken language
Barolong Ba Ga Makgobi	60601	309.22	2,141	Tswana
Barolong Ba Ga Molefe Ba Moata	60602	266.70	12,725	Tswana
Barolong Boo Rashidi	60603	56.33	42	Tswana
Barolong Boo Ratlou Ba Ga Phoi	60604	650.27	71,190	Tswana
Batlharo Ba Ga Masibi	60605	952.26	15,825	Tswana
Remainder of the municipality	60606	2,303.38	2,404	Tswana

== Politics ==
The municipal council consists of twenty-seven members elected by mixed-member proportional representation. Fourteen councillors are elected by first-past-the-post voting in fourteen wards, while the remaining thirteen are chosen from party lists so that the total number of party representatives is proportional to the number of votes received.

In the election of 4 November 2026 the African National Congress (ANC) won a majority of fifteen seats on the council.

The following table shows the results of the election.

Party	Ward			List			Total seats
Party	Votes	%	Seats	Votes	%	Seats	Total seats
African National Congress	13,986	55.45	14	14,086	56.20	1	15
Economic Freedom Fighters	2,241	8.89	0	2,280	9.10	2	2
South African Communist Party	2,040	8.09	0	1,980	7.90	2	2
Democratic Alliance	1,661	6.59	0	1,727	6.89	2	2
ActionSA	1,499	5.94	0	1,365	5.45	2	2
uMkhonto weSizwe Party	1,125	4.46	0	1,118	4.46	1	1
Patriotic Alliance	587	2.33	0	601	2.40	1	1
African People's Convention	568	2.25	0	497	1.98	1	1
United Christian Democratic Party	514	2.04	0	497	1.98	1	1
Independent candidates	256	1.02	0				0
6 other parties	744	2.95	0	912	3.64	0	0
Total	25,221	100.00	14	25,063	100.00	13	27
Valid votes	25,221	96.96		25,063	96.67		
Invalid/blank votes	792	3.04		863	3.33		
Total votes	26,013	100.00		25,926	100.00		
Registered voters/turnout	56,008	46.45		56,008	46.29		

== Corruption ==
In October 2023, a report unveiled numerous incidents of corruption in the municipality, with the municipality accused of having paid millions of rands for the installation of dysfunctional water tanks, over R4 million for the construction of two roads which were never built, and over R3 million for a stadium that was never built.
