= Lazarus Mokgosi =

South African politician (born 1970)

Lazarus Mokgosi MPL

8th Premier of the North West
- Incumbent
- Assumed office 14 June 2024
- Preceded by: Bushy Maape

Member of the North West Provincial Legislature
- Incumbent
- Assumed office December 2022

Deputy Provincial Chairperson of the African National Congress in the North West
- Incumbent
- Assumed office August 2022
- Chairperson: Nono Maloyi
- Preceded by: Sello Lehari

Personal details
- Born: 14 June 1970 (age 56)
- Party: African National Congress
- Nickname: Lazzy

Lazarus "Lazzy" Mokgosi (born 14 June 1970) is a South African politician who has been the eighth Premier of the North West since June 2024 and a Member of the North West Provincial Legislature since December 2022. He is a member of the African National Congress (ANC) and in August 2022 was elected to a four-year term as Deputy Provincial Chairperson of the party's North West branch.

According to City Press, Mokgosi was elected to the party office on a slate of candidates aligned to Nono Maloyi, who was elected ANC Provincial Chairperson at the same party elective conference. Mokgosi won the position in a contest against Paul Sebegoe; he received 353 votes against Sebego's 311. He was sworn into the provincial legislature in December, reportedly after the ANC amended its party list to elevate him. He filled a casual vacancy arising from the resignation of Wendy Matsemela earlier that month.

Mokgosi joined the Provincial Executive Council in July 2023, taking over as the MEC for Social Development from Boitumelo Moiloa. Following the 2024 general election, Mokgosi was promoted to premier, succeeding Bushy Maape.
