= Ndleleni Duma =

South African politician (1958–2018)

Member of the North West Provincial Legislature
- In office 21 May 2014 – 23 November 2018
- In office April 2004 – May 2009

Member of the National Assembly
- In office 6 May 2009 – 6 May 2014

Personal details
- Born: Ndleleni Moses Duma; 26 August 1958 Collersfontein, Orange Free State; Union of South Africa
- Died: 23 November 2018 (aged 60)
- Party: African National Congress

Ndleleni Moses Duma (26 August 1958 – 23 November 2018) was a South African politician who represented the African National Congress (ANC) in the North West Provincial Legislature until his death in 2018. He also served in the National Assembly between 2009 and 2014. He was a Member of the North West Executive Council from 2004 to 2009 during the premiership of Edna Molewa; during the same period, he was convicted on theft charges in connection with his involvement in the Travelgate scandal during an earlier period of service in the national Parliament.

A former anti-apartheid activist, Duma was a prominent figure in the ANC of the North West Province. He was the inaugural Provincial Secretary of the North West ANC between 1994 and 1998, under Chairperson Popo Molefe, and later deputised Supra Mahumapelo as Deputy Provincial Secretary from 2005 to 2008. He served on the ANC National Executive Committee from 2007 to 2012.

== Early life ==
Duma was born on 26 August 1958 in Collersfontein near Bothaville in the former Orange Free State (later the Free State Province). He was the ninth of fourteen siblings. According to Zakes Malekane, he recruited Duma into the ANC underground in 1977. During the 1980s, Duma was a founding member of the Ikageng Civic Association and an organiser for the United Democratic Front. He later served as the ANC's head of political education and organising in the Western Transvaal.

== Legislative career ==
After apartheid ended in 1994, Duma became the inaugural Provincial Secretary of the ANC's branch in the new North West Province. He served in that office until 1998, gaining re-election in 1996, and served under Provincial Chairperson Popo Molefe. He lost his position in 1998 when he unsuccessfully challenged Molefe for the chairmanship. He also represented the ANC in Parliament until the 2004 general election, when he was elected to the North West Provincial Legislature.

=== North West Executive Council: 2004–2009 ===
Pursuant to the 2004 general election, on 30 April 2004, Duma was also appointed to the Executive Council of the North West by newly elected Premier Edna Molewa, who named him Member of the Executive Council (MEC) for Agriculture, Conservation, Environment and Tourism. On 23 August 2005, Molewa announced a reshuffle in which he was moved to a new portfolio as MEC for Arts, Culture and Sports; he remained in that office for the rest of the legislative term.

==== Travelgate conviction ====
In February 2005, Duma appeared in court in Cape Town on fraud and theft charges emanating from his tenure in the national Parliament. He was accused of claiming unlawful benefits from Parliament as part of the so-called Travelgate fraud. In October 2006, he signed a plea bargain and pleaded guilty in the Cape High Court to theft in relation to R51,000 in unlawful benefits. He was sentenced to pay a fine of R30,000 or serve three years' imprisonment, with a further mandatory five years' imprisonment suspended for five years.

==== Drunk driving charge ====
In 2005, while the Travelgate charges were pending, Duma was acquitted of a drunk driving charge on a technicality after a protracted trial. According to the Mail & Guardian, ahead of the trial, the ANC caucus in the provincial legislature gave him a standing ovation "in a show of moral support"; after his acquittal, the ANC passed a motion to congratulate him, which the opposition Democratic Alliance called "an insult to thousands of South Africans who are victims of accidents caused by drunk driving".

==== ANC Deputy Provincial Secretary ====
Also in 2005, Duma was elected Deputy Provincial Secretary of the ANC's North West branch. He served under Premier Molewa, who succeeded Molefe as Provincial Chairperson, and deputised Provincial Secretary Supra Mahumapelo. Duma was initially viewed as a member of Mahumapelo's anti-Molefe "Taliban" faction, but by early 2007, as the next provincial elective conference approached, the Mail & Guardian said that the Taliban had turned against Duma because of his conviction on the Travelgate charges. Duma dismissed this claim, saying, "As far as I'm concerned, the thing [Travelgate] is over". However, it was rumoured that his relationship with Mahumapelo was increasingly strained and that he was at the head of a new faction, nicknamed the "Potch mafia" (after the North West town on Potchefstroom), which drew together disgruntled members of the Taliban and members of opposing factions.

In December 2007, at the ANC's 52nd National Conference in Polokwane, Duma was elected to the party's National Executive Committee; by number of votes received, he was ranked 72nd of the 80 ordinary members elected. However, at the provincial elective conference in May 2008, he was succeeded as Provincial Secretary by Nikiwe Num.

=== National Assembly: 2009–2014 ===
In the 2009 general election, Duma did not stand for re-election to the provincial legislature but instead was elected to return to the national Parliament as a Member of the National Assembly. The Democratic Alliance harshly criticised the ANC for nominating Duma and others who had been convicted in Travelgate. He was not re-elected to the ANC National Executive Committee in December 2012.

=== North West Legislature: 2014–2018 ===
In the next general election in 2014, after a full term in the National Assembly, Duma returned to the North West Provincial Legislature, ranked 20th on the ANC's provincial party list. He was still serving as an ordinary Member of the Provincial Legislature at the time of his death; his seat was filled by Mmoloki Cwaile.

== Personal life and death ==
Duma died on 23 November 2018 after a long illness. The President of South Africa, Cyril Ramaphosa, granted him a special provincial official funeral, which was held on 1 December at Ikageng Stadium in Potchefstroom. North West Premier Job Mokgoro delivered the eulogy. Several government officials were later charged with fraud for alleged misappropriation of municipal funds designated for Duma's funeral.

He was married to Nolwendle Duma and had three children, two sons and one daughter.
