= Wendy Nelson (politician) =

South African politician

North West MEC for Tourism
- In office 6 December 2018 – 7 May 2019
- Premier: Job Mokgoro
- Preceded by: Desbo Mohono
- Succeeded by: Kenetswe Mosenogi (for Economic Development, Environment and Tourism)

North West MEC for Finance, Economy and Enterprise Development
- In office 27 May 2014 – 6 December 2018
- Premier: Supra Mahumapelo; Job Mokgoro
- Preceded by: Paul Sebegoe (for Finance)
- Succeeded by: Wendy Matsemela

Member of the North West Provincial Legislature
- In office 21 May 2014 – 7 May 2019

Member of the National Assembly of South Africa
- In office 6 May 2009 – 6 May 2014

Personal details
- Born: Wendy Joy Nelson; 25 December 1962 (age 63)
- Party: African National Congress

Wendy Joy Nelson (born 25 December 1962) is a South African politician from the North West. She was the North West Finance, Economy and Enterprise Development MEC from 2015 to 2018, and the North West Tourism MEC from 2018 to 2019. She was also a Member of the North West Provincial Legislature for the African National Congress (ANC) from 2014 to 2019. She briefly served as the acting Premier of North West in 2018. She was a Member of the National Assembly from 2009 to 2014. Nelson had also been involved in the local politics of the Dr Kenneth Kaunda District Municipality.

Nelson was arrested on charges of fraud in August 2019. Nelson won the case, the North West High Court acquitted Nelson of all charges relating to fraud.

== Political career ==
She served as a municipal councillor of the Matlosana Local Municipality from 1994 to 2000. At the same time, she served as a member of the Dr Kenneth Kaunda District Municipality. She was appointed a Member of the Mayoral Committee of the district municipality after the 2000 municipal elections. From 2006 to 2009, she was the speaker of the district municipality.

Nelson was a Member of the National Assembly of South Africa from 2009 until 2014. During her time as an MP, she served as a whip of the COGTA committee.

After the 2014 elections, Nelson took office as a Member of the North West Provincial Legislature. Premier Supra Mahumapelo appointed her as the Member of the Executive Council for Finance, Economy and Enterprise Development.

Premier Supra Mahumapelo announced on 9 May 2018 that he would be taking special leave following violent protests calling for his removal. Nelson was sworn in as acting premier. Her swearing-in generated controversy since Nelson, at that stage, was facing fraud allegations. Mahumapelo officially resigned on 23 May 2018 and Nelson continued in her acting position until Job Mokgoro was elected and sworn in. Nelson was appointed to his Executive Council as the MEC for Tourism and served in the post until she left the provincial government in May 2019.

In August 2019, Nelson and former Head of Department (HOD) of the provincial Health Department, Thabo Lekalakala, were arrested by the Hawks on fraud charges. Nelson was involved in Lekalakala's irregular appointment. Nelson's arrest was the first significant arrest of a senior government official following the intervention of the national government in the provincial government's affairs. Nelson and Dr. Lekalakala won the case. The North West High Court acquitted former North West Finance MEC Wendy Nelson and former North West health head of department Dr Andrew Lekalakala on charges of fraud. Opposition parties expressed satisfaction over the arrests. The Democratic Alliance Provincial Leader, Joe McGluwa, said that the arrests were "only a drop in the ocean of North West corruption". The African Transformation Movement (ATM) welcomed the arrests.
