= Gordon Kegakilwe =

South African politician (1967–2020)

North West MEC for Cooperative Governance, Human Settlement and Traditional Affairs
- In office 28 May 2019 – 6 July 2020
- Premier: Job Mokgoro
- Preceded by: Position reconfigured (Motlalepula Rosho as MEC for Local Government and Human Settlement)
- Succeeded by: Mmoloki Cwaile

North West MEC for Local Government and Traditional Affairs
- In office 8 May 2009 – 25 November 2010
- Premier: Maureen Modiselle; Thandi Modise
- Preceded by: Howard Yawa
- Succeeded by: Paul Sebegoe

Member of the North West Provincial Legislature
- In office 22 May 2019 – 6 July 2020
- In office 6 May 2009 – January 2016

Personal details
- Born: Mothibedi Gordon Kegakilwe; 1 April 1967 Tlakgameng, Transvaal Province, South Africa
- Died: 6 July 2020 (aged 53) Klerksdorp, South Africa
- Party: African National Congress
- Spouse: Betty
- Children: 3
- Education: University of the Free State; University of the Witwatersrand
- Profession: Politician

Mothibedi Gordon Kegakilwe (1 April 1967 – 6 July 2020) was a South African politician and a party member of the African National Congress. He served as the North West MEC for Cooperative Governance, Human Settlement and Traditional Affairs from May 2019 until his death in July 2020.

Kegakilwe was elected to the North West Provincial Legislature in May 2009. He served as the MEC for Local Government and Traditional Affairs from 2009 until 2010 and was the ANC's chief whip between 2011 and 2013. In January 2016, he resigned as an MPL but returned to the legislature after the May 2019 elections. Within the ANC, Kegakilwe served as deputy provincial secretary and as acting provincial secretary.

== Early life and education ==
Mothibedi Gordon Kegakilwe was born on 1 April 1967 in Tlakgameng, north of Vryburg in the Transvaal Province. He started school at Kegakilwe Primary School in 1973 and matriculated from Pinagare College. Kegakilwe then enrolled for a degree in medicine at the Medical University of Southern Africa (now Sefako Makgatho Health Sciences University). He dropped out due to anti-apartheid activities.

Kegakilwe obtained a degree in education, an honours degree in chemistry and a master's degree in governance from the University of the Free State. He achieved a certificate in management from the University of the Witwatersrand. He proceeded to teach at a local college.

== Political career ==
Kegakilwe joined the African National Congress and served as the head of the party's Dr Ruth Segomotsi Mompati region from 2006 until 2010. He was also the municipal manager of the Kagisano-Molopo Local Municipality. He was elected to the North West Provincial Legislature in May 2009. He was sworn in as a member of the legislature on 6 May 2009. Premier Maureen Modiselle named him MEC for Local Government and Traditional Affairs.

Thandi Modise was elected premier in November 2010, and she removed him from the post. The ANC then appointed him chief whip of the legislature. He served in the post from 2011 until his resignation in 2013 due to allegations of him abusing state funds. Within the ANC, Kegakilwe served as deputy provincial secretary and as acting provincial secretary. He ran for provincial secretary in November 2013 but lost to Dakota Legoete.

In May 2014, he was re-elected to a second term as an MPL, but he resigned from the legislature in January 2016. Kegakilwe returned to the legislature in May 2019. Premier Job Mokgoro named him the member of the Executive Council responsible for Cooperative Governance, Human Settlement and Traditional Affairs.

== Death ==
On 5 July 2020, Kegakilwe was admitted to a medical facility in Vryburg after testing positive for COVID-19 during the COVID-19 pandemic in South Africa. He was transferred to a Klerksdorp hospital on 6 July but, due to complications from the virus, he suffered cardiac arrest and died. He was 53 years old. Various politicians, including national Cooperative Governance and Traditional Affairs minister Nkosazana Dlamini-Zuma and Human Settlements minister Lindiwe Sisulu, paid tribute to Kegakilwe. He is survived by his wife and six children.
