= Manketsi Tlhape =

South African politician

Member of the National Assembly of South Africa
- In office 22 May 2019 – 28 May 2024

Personal details
- Born: Manketsi Mamoabi Emily Tlhape
- Party: African National Congress

Manketsi Mamoabi Emily Tlhape is a South African politician who served as an African National Congress (ANC) Member of the National Assembly of South Africa from 2019 until 2024.

== Political career ==
Tlhape had served as a Member of the Executive Council (MEC) in the North West provincial government. In December 2018, she was fired as an MEC by premier Job Mokgoro over reports that she stole cattle meant for emerging farmers.

Tlhape was elected to the National Assembly from the ANC's national list in the 2019 general election. Tlhape stood for reelection in 2024 but was ranked too low on the ANC's list.
