= Wendy Matsemela =

South African politician (born 1968)

Member of the North West Executive Council for Education
- In office May 2019 – 7 December 2022
- Premier: Job Mokgoro; Bushy Maape
- Preceded by: Sello Lehari (for Education and Sports Development)
- Succeeded by: Viola Motsumi

Member of the North West Executive Council for Finance, Economy and Enterprise Development
- In office December 2018 – May 2019
- Premier: Job Mokgoro
- Preceded by: Wendy Nelson (for Finance)
- Succeeded by: Motlalepula Rosho

Personal details
- Born: 11 June 1968 (age 58) Magong, Transvaal; South Africa
- Party: African National Congress
- Education: North-West University

Mmaphefo Lucy "Wendy" Matsemela (born 11 June 1968) is a South African politician who was Member of the Executive Council (MEC) for Education in the North West from May 2019 to December 2022. She represented the African National Congress (ANC) in the National Assembly from 2004 to 2009 and in the North West Provincial Legislature from 2009 to 2022. While in the provincial legislature, she served almost continuously in the North West Executive Council, excepting two gaps from 2010 to 2013 and from 2016 to 2018. She resigned from the provincial legislature in December 2022 after Premier Bushy Maape fired her as an MEC.

== Early life and career ==
Matsemela was born on 11 June 1968 in the village of Magong, an area that now forms part of Moses Kotane in the North West province. She was the tenth of thirteen siblings. In 1987, she matriculated at Tshukudu High School and began work in the retail sector and then as a temporary teacher. She subsequently enrolled at North-West University, where she became politically active in the student representative council and South African Students Congress. After graduating with a Bachelor of Arts in education in 1996, she became a professional teacher and a member of the South African Democratic Teachers Union (SADTU). She also rose through the regional and provincial ranks of the African National Congress (ANC) and its Youth League (ANCYL), ultimately securing election as ANCYL Secretary in the Bojanala region and ANC Chairperson in the Rustenberg region.

== Political career ==
In 2005, Matsemela left teaching to represent the ANC in the National Assembly, the lower house of the South African Parliament, where she served for four years. Pursuant to the 2009 general election, she was elected to the North West Provincial Legislature, and on 8 May 2009, Maureen Modiselle, the newly elected Premier of the North West, appointed her to the North West Executive Council as Member of the Executive Council (MEC) for Economic Development and Tourism.

On 25 November 2010, after less than two years in the Executive Council, Matsemela was fired by Modiselle's successor, Thandi Modise. She remained an ordinary Member of the Provincial Legislature until 27 June 2013, when Modise announced that she would return to the Executive Council as MEC for Education and Training; she succeeded Louisa Mabe, who had been implicated in procurement irregularities in the portfolio.

Matsemela was re-elected to her legislative seat in the 2014 general election, ranked seventh on the ANC's party list in the North West. Supra Mahumapelo, who was elected Premier in the same election, appointed her to his new Executive Council as MEC for Education and Sports Development. On 8 May 2016, Mahumapelo announced that he had fired Matsemela and replaced her with Sello Lehari. She remained a Member of the Provincial Legislature, and in December 2018 she was returned to the Executive Council by Mahumapelo's successor, Job Mokgoro, who appointed her MEC for Finance, Economy and Enterprise Development.

In the 2019 general election, Matsemela was ranked tenth on the ANC's party list and was re-elected to the provincial legislature; she was appointed MEC for Education in Mokgoro's new Executive Council. However, Mokgoro's successor as Premier, Bushy Maape, announced in November 2022 that Matsemela would be replaced as MEC on 7 December 2022. On 6 December, she tendered her immediate resignation from the provincial legislature. Sources told City Press that she had resigned because of her demotion from the Executive Council, possibly because she felt that she was being punished for supporting Cyril Ramaphosa, who that month was running for re-election as ANC president at the party's 55th National Conference. She was replaced as Education MEC by Viola Motsumi.

== Personal life ==
As of 2021, Matsemela had one child, Kamogelo, and acted as a guardian to four other children.
