= Jerry Thibedi =

South African politician

Member of the National Assembly
- In office 19 August 2010 – 6 May 2014

Member of the North West Provincial Legislature
- In office May 1994 – May 2009

Personal details
- Born: Jerry Dimotana Thibedi; 7 April 1954 (age 72) Makapanstad, Transvaal; Union of South Africa
- Party: African National Congress
- Other political affiliations: South African Communist Party

Jerry Dimotana Thibedi (born 7 April 1954) is a South African politician who represented the African National Congress (ANC) in the National Assembly from 2010 to 2019 and in the North West Provincial Legislature from 1994 to 2009. He was the inaugural Speaker of the North West Provincial Legislature between 1994 and 1999 and subsequently served in the North West Executive Council between 1999 and 2009 under Premiers Popo Molefe and Edna Molewa.

Formerly a prominent trade unionist and anti-apartheid activist in the Transvaal, Thibedi also served as Deputy Provincial Chairperson of the North West ANC from 1998 to 2005. He has been a member of the Central Committee of the South African Communist Party since 1998.

== Early life and education ==
Thibedi was born on 7 April 1954 in Makapanstad outside Hammanskraal in the present-day North West Province. He matriculated at Ithuteng Commercial School in Makapanstad in 1974. After the end of apartheid, he completed two diplomas at the Harvard Kennedy School and a master's in governance and political transformation at the University of the Free State.

== Trade union activism ==
After matriculating, Thibedi worked in industry, at Metropolitan Insurance in Mabopane and then as a laboratory inspector at Siemens in Rosslyn. In the latter position, from 1982, he served as a shop steward, and ultimately as a branch chairperson, for the Metal and Allied Workers' Union. In 1986, he was elected as the inaugural chairperson of the Northern Transvaal regional branch of the ANC-allied Congress of South African Trade Unions (Cosatu); he held that position until 1988, when he joined the National Union of Metalworkers of South Africa, where he worked until 1994. He was also an organiser for the United Democratic Front in the Transvaal from 1983 to 1991.

Thibedi's union activism was closely intertwined with anti-apartheid activism, and in October 1987 his house in Mabopane was bombed by officers of the South African Police. He was inside the house, with his wife, sister, and young daughter, but all were largely unharmed in the attack. Almost a decade later, at the Truth and Reconciliation Commission, officers of the police's Security Branch applied for amnesty in connection with the attack, confessing to attempted murder and conspiracy to commit murder. The officers said that they – and notorious askari Joe Mamasela – had carried out the attack with a coffee tin packed with explosives, under orders to assassinate Thibedi because of his involvement in consumer boycotts in the Transvaal.

== Legislative career ==
=== North West Speaker: 1994–1999 ===
In South Africa's first post-apartheid elections in 1994, Thibedi was elected to represent the ANC in the North West Provincial Legislature, where he served as the inaugural Speaker of the North West Provincial Legislature from 1994 to 1999. In 1998, he was elected Deputy Provincial Chairperson of the ANC's North West branch, serving under Chairperson Popo Molefe; he served in that office until 2005, gaining re-election in 2002. Also in 1998, he was elected for the first time to the Central Committee of the South African Communist Party (SACP).

=== North West Executive Council: 1999–2009 ===
After the 1999 general election, Molefe, in his capacity as Premier, appointed Thibedi to the North West Executive Council as Member of the Executive Council (MEC) in the Office of the Premier with responsibility for Corporate and Traditional Affairs. He served in that office until a 2002 reshuffle saw him moved to a new portfolio as MEC for Roads and Public Works, where he remained until the end of Molefe's premiership.

Pursuant to the 2004 general election, he was re-elected to his third term in the provincial legislature and newly elected Premier Edna Molewa appointed him as MEC for Transport and Roads. He effectively remained in this portfolio throughout Molewa's term, though Molewa reconfigured it twice: in August 2005, he became MEC for Roads, Transport and Safety, and in May 2007, he became MEC for Public Works.

=== National Assembly: 2009–2014 ===
In the 2009 general election, Thibedi was not re-elected to the provincial legislature. Instead, on 19 August 2010, he was sworn in to fill a casual vacancy in the National Assembly, the lower house of the South African Parliament. In June 2013, he was elected to chair the Portfolio Committee on Rural and Agrarian Reform, succeeding Stone Sizani, who had been appointed Majority Chief Whip.

== Retirement ==
He did not stand for re-election to Parliament in 2014, but instead retired to Tshwane. He has served continuously in the SACP Central Committee since 1998 and was re-elected to the committee in 2022.
