= Motlalepula Rosho =

South African politician (born 1970)

Motlalepula Rosho MPL

North West MEC for Finance
- In office 28 May 2019 – 14 June 2024
- Premier: Bushy Maape; Job Mokgoro
- Preceded by: Wendy Matsemela
- Succeeded by: Kenetswe Mosenogi

North West MEC for Local Government and Human Settlement
- In office 6 December 2018 – 28 May 2019
- Premier: Job Mokgoro
- Preceded by: Fenny Gaolaolwe
- Succeeded by: Gordon Kegakilwe

North West MEC for Economic Development, Environment, Conservation and Tourism
- In office 3 May 2012 – 27 May 2014
- Premier: Thandi Modise
- Preceded by: Tebogo Modise
- Succeeded by: Wendy Nelson

Deputy Speaker of the North West Provincial Legislature
- In office 2010–2012

Personal details
- Party: African National Congress

Motlalepula Ziphora Rosho (born 19 July 1970) is a South African politician. A member of the African National Congress, she was elected deputy speaker of the North West Provincial Legislature in 2010. In 2012 she was appointed as the Member of the Executive Council (MEC) for Economic Development, Environment, Conservation and Tourism in the North West Provincial Government. Rosho was discharged from the executive council in 2014 and then served in the provincial legislature as a committee chairperson until December 2018, when she returned to the executive as MEC for Local Government and Human Settlement. Rosho was appointed as MEC for Finance after the 2019 elections. After the 2024 election, she became the chief whip of the house in the legislature.

== Background ==
Rosho holds a BA honours degree in communications, as well as a postgraduate diploma in public policy and African studies. In 1989 she served on the student representative council at Botoka Comprehension School. She became a member of the Congress of South African Students in 1986 and the African National Congress Youth League in 1992. The following year, Rosho joined the ANC intelligence and security structure and went for training on intelligence science and security in Egypt in 1994. She was also an investigative journalist for the South African National Civic Organization between 1990 and 1994 and a media organiser for Western Transvaal and Northern Cape Provinces and a member of the subcommittee of media relations at SANCO and the ANC Western Transvaal.

Rosho became a member of the strategic management team to integrate the Bophuthatswana administration and the Cape Province and the Transvaal Province administrations after the 1994 general elections. In 1995, Rosho became a researcher for the National Intelligence Agency. She was also an editor for the ANC Western Transvaal newsletter of Moelatlhoko and a member of the African Union for Journalists. Rosho became a spokesperson for the MEC for Agriculture, Conservation and Environment in 2004 and then served as a senior manager for multiple management directorates.

== Political career ==
In 2009, Rosho was elected as an ANC Member of the North West Provincial Legislature. She was then elected to serve chair of the Standing Committee on Public Accounts. In 2010, she was voted in as deputy speaker of the provincial legislature. Rosho was appointed to the provincial government as Member of the Executive Council (MEC) for the provincial department of Economic Development, Environment, Conservation and Tourism by premier Thandi Modise in May 2012. After the 2014 provincial election, Supra Mahumapelo was elected premier. Rosho was not reappointed to the provincial executive council.

Rosho was appointed chairperson of the Portfolio Committee on Finance, Economy & Enterprise Development. In 2015, she was elected as chairperson of the Portfolio Committee on Local Government and Human Settlement.She returned to the executive council in December 2018, following her appointment as MEC for Local Government and Human Settlement by premier Job Mokgoro. After the 2019 election, Mokgoro moved her to the Finance portfolio of the executive council.

In June 2021, Rosho was one of three candidates the ANC interim provincial committee had submitted to the National Working Committee of the ANC to replace Mokgoro as premier after Mokgoro had refused to resign despite the provincial and national ANC structures telling him to do so. On 17 August 2021, party veteran Bushy Maape was announced as the ANC's preferred candidate to replace Mokgoro as premier. Mokgoro resigned as premier on 26 August and the executive council unanimously appointed her as acting premier. She served in the position until Maape was elected and sworn in as premier on 7 September.

In early-2022, it was reported that Rosho was lobbying for the position of ANC provincial chairperson ahead of the party's provincial conference. At the provincial elective conference, Rosho did not contest the provincial chairperson position; she instead successfully stood for election to the ANC Provincial Executive Committee.

Rosho was elected chief whip of the house following the 2024 general election.
