= Bushy Maape =

South African politician (1957–2026)

7th Premier of the North West
- In office 7 September 2021 – 14 June 2024
- Preceded by: Motlalepula Rosho (acting); Job Mokgoro
- Succeeded by: Lazzy Mokgosi

Member of the North West Provincial Legislature
- In office 1 September 2021 – 14 June 2024
- Preceded by: Job Mokgoro

Personal details
- Born: Kaobitsa Abel Bushy Maape; 28 July 1957 Vryburg, Union of South Africa
- Died: 16 May 2026 (aged 68) Johannesburg, South Africa
- Party: African National Congress
- Education: University of South Africa; University of the Western Cape

Kaobitsa Abel Bushy Maape (28 July 1957 – 16 May 2026) was a South African politician and anti-apartheid activist who served as the 7th Premier of the North West and as member of the North West Provincial Legislature from September 2021 until May 2024. Maape was a member of the African National Congress and a Robben Island prisoner.

== Early life and education ==
Maape was born on 28 July 1957 in Vryburg in the present-day North West Province of South Africa. He earned a Bachelor of Arts degree in psychology and economics from the University of South Africa which he completed while imprisoned on Robben Island. He also holds an honours degree in developmental studies and an honours degree in economics from the University of the Western Cape. At the time he was named the ANC's candidate for North West Premier in August 2021, he studying for a Master of Management in the field of governance at the University of the Witwatersrand.

== Career ==
Maape was recruited into the underground structures of the African National Congress while enrolled at the Hebron Training College. He commanded the ANC's underground Kgalagadi Machinery. He was also principal of the Kuruman Middle School. In February 1986 Maape was convicted of propagating the communist aims of the ANC, though acquitted of the main terrorism charge and imprisoned at Robben Island. He was one of the first six ANC prisoners released from Robben Island following president F.W. de Klerk's decision to release political prisoners.

He served as chairperson of the ANC's Kgalagadi region following the end of apartheid in the 1990s. Maape was later the director of Reconstruction and Development Programme (RDP) as well as the chief director for strategic planning and development unit in the Office of the Premier of the North West. Maape served on the Ministerial Advisory Committee of the Department of Provincial and Local Government and was a member of the Municipal Demarcation Board from the North West Province.

== North West Premiership ==
In June 2021, the National Working Committee of the ANC instructed the Interim Provincial Committee (IPC) of the ANC in the North West to submit them the names of three people to replace Job Mokgoro as premier by the end of the week. This instruction came after Mokgoro had refused to resign as premier earlier in the year after he was accused of being responsible for the poor state of local municipalities in the province. He had a fallout with the ANC IPC, which accused him of ignoring instructions. On 17 August 2021, the IPC's coordinator Hlumani Chauke announced Maape as the party's candidate to replace Mokgoro as premier. Maape was selected over two other potential candidates for premier: the speaker of the provincial legislature Sussana Dantjie and the finance member of the executive council Motlalepula Rosho.

Maape was reportedly seen as a compromise candidate to appease party factions and was expected to be sworn in as a member of the provincial legislature and premier later in the week, however, on 20 August 2021, it was reported that none of the 21 ANC Members of the Provincial Legislature, including Mokgoro, had offered to resign their seats in the legislature. Mokgoro officially resigned as premier on 26 August and Finance MEC Motlalepula Rosho was sworn in as acting premier. Mokgoro did not resign as a member of the provincial legislature on that day. An ANC MPL needed to resign in order for Maape to be sworn in as a member of the provincial legislature and then be elected premier. Mokgoro resigned as an MPL on 27 August. Maape was sworn in as a member of the provincial legislature on 1 September.

During a full sitting of the North West Provincial Legislature on 7 September 2021, Maape was elected as premier, despite a challenge from the DA's Winston Rabotapi. Maape received 21 votes compared to Rabotapi's 5 votes. He was sworn in later that day.

In August 2022, at the ANC's provincial elective conference in Rustenburg, Maape went up against former MP Nono Maloyi for the provincial chairperson position. Maloyi, who had been endorsed by the former provincial chairperson Supra Mahumapelo, handedly defeated Maape by 76 votes. Maape then unsuccessfully stood for election to the ANC Provincial Executive Committee. After the results were announced Maloyi said that Maape remain as premier, adding: "In this movement today at this conference, we were not electing the premier. We were electing the chairperson of the ANC." During the first meeting of the newly elected PEC, Maloyi reiterated that Maape would not be removed as premier. Despite the reassurance from Maloyi that Maape would not be removed as premier, speculation remained that Maape could be forced out.

He was succeeded in the post of premier by Lazarus Mokgosi on 14 June 2024.

== Death ==
Maape died in Johannesburg on 16 May 2026, at the age of 68, following a short illness.

Political offices
Preceded by Motlalepula Rosho (acting); Job Mokgoro	7th Premier of the North West; 7 September 2021 – 14 June 2024	Succeeded by Lazarus Mokgosi
