= Nono Maloyi =

South African politician (born 1968)

Nono Maloyi MPL

Member of the North West Executive Council for Human Settlement, Cooperative Governance and Traditional Affairs
- In office November 2022 – 14 June 2024
- Premier: Bushy Maape
- Preceded by: Lenah Miga

Provincial Chairperson of the African National Congress in the North West
- Incumbent
- Assumed office August 2022
- Deputy: Lazzy Mokgosi
- Preceded by: Supra Mahumapelo
- In office May 2008 – July 2009
- Deputy: Molefi Sefularo
- Preceded by: Edna Molewa
- Succeeded by: Supra Mahumapelo

Member of the National Assembly
- In office 3 June 2016 – 28 February 2019
- In office 23 April 2004 – 25 June 2007
- Constituency: North West
Other political offices
Member of the North West Executive Council for Human Settlement, Public Safety and Liaison
In office April 2012 – 6 May 2014
Premier	Thandi Modise
Succeeded by	Collen Maine (for Local Government and Human Settlements)
Speaker of the North West Provincial Legislature
In office May 2009 – April 2012
Premier	Maureen Modiselle; Thandi Modise
Preceded by	Thandi Modise
Succeeded by	Supra Mahumapelo

Personal details
- Born: 5 May 1968 (age 58)
- Citizenship: South African
- Party: African National Congress

Patrick Dumile Nono Maloyi (born 5 May 1968) is a South African politician who served as the Member of the Executive Council (MEC) for Human Settlement, Cooperative Governance and Traditional Affairs in the North West province from November 2022 until June 2024. In August 2022, he was elected Provincial Chairperson of the African National Congress (ANC) in the North West, a position he formerly held from 2008 to 2009.

Maloyi has served in both the National Assembly and the North West Provincial Legislature; he was formerly the Speaker of the North West Provincial Legislature from 2009 to 2012 and MEC for Human Settlement and Public Safety from 2012 to 2014. Most proximately, he served in the National Assembly from 2016 until 2019, when he retreated from legislative politics. He was sworn back in to the provincial legislature in early November 2022 after returning to the ANC chairmanship, and he was reappointed to the North West Executive Council shortly afterwards.

== Early life and activism ==
Maloyi was born on 5 May 1968. According to Maloyi, he became a member of the African National Congress (ANC) in the mid-1980s, and in the post-apartheid period he rose to prominence in the ANC of the North West province. He was a local leader of the ANC Youth League and, according to the Mail & Guardian, he was a political opponent of Popo Molefe, who represented the ANC as Premier of the North West between 1994 and 2004.

== Parliament: 2004–2007 ==
In the 2004 general election, Maloyi was elected to represent the ANC in the National Assembly, serving the North West constituency. During the legislative term that followed, he was one of several politicians implicated in South Africa's Travelgate scandal, which concerned the abuse of parliamentary travel vouchers. The following year, he pled guilty to one count of fraud, in relation to an amount of R150,000, and in October 2006 he was sentenced to pay a fine of R60,000 or serve five years' imprisonment.

== North West Legislature: 2007–2016 ==
=== Election as ANC chair: 2008 ===
On 25 June 2007, Maloyi resigned from his seat in the National Assembly in order to swop seats with the ANC's Nomvula Hlangwana; she filled his seat in Parliament and he was sworn in to her seat in the North West Provincial Legislature, where he served as Chief Whip of the Majority Party.

In 2008, at a hotly contested ANC provincial conference, Maloyi was elected provincial chairperson of the ANC in the North West. He was viewed as aligned to Thabo Mbeki, who had recently lost the ANC presidency to Jacob Zuma at the ANC's 52nd National Conference.

=== Speaker: 2009–2012 ===
The following year, after the ANC's victory in the North West in the 2009 general election, Maloyi was one of three candidates whom the provincial ANC recommended for the post of Premier. However, that position went to Maureen Modiselle and Maloyi was instead elected as Speaker of the North West Provincial Legislature.

Shortly into Maloyi's tenure as Speaker, in July 2009, his term as ANC provincial chairperson ended prematurely when the ANC National Executive Committee disbanded the party's entire North West provincial leadership. Maloyi's supporters claimed that the move was retribution by the national leadership for the North West's support for Mbeki at the 52nd National Conference. When the North West ANC elected its new leadership in 2011, Supra Mahumapelo, who had been ANC provincial secretary under Maloyi, was elected to succeed Maloyi as chairperson. A source told the Mail & Guardian that Maloyi had intended to run for re-election but had lost the support of Mahumapelo and his supporters, and that the relationship between Maloyi and Mahumapelo subsequently soured.

He resigned as Speaker in April 2012; summarising his tenure, he quoted Charles Dickens: "it was the best of times, it was the worst of times".

=== Executive Council: 2012–2014 ===
Maloyi left the speaker's office to became Member of the Executive Council (MEC) for Human Settlement, Public Safety and Liaison under Modiselle's successor, Premier Thandi Modise.

Pursuant to the 2014 general election, Mahumapelo was elected to succeed Modise as Premier, and though Maloyi was re-elected to his seat in the provincial legislature, he was not re-appointed to the Executive Council.

== Return to Parliament: 2016–2019 ==
In June 2016, Maloyi resigned from the provincial legislature and was appointed to return to the National Assembly. During Maloyi's time in Parliament, Mahumapelo's ANC provincial executive committee was disbanded by the ANC National Executive Committee in 2018 and Maloyi was appointed to the interim task team which was installed to take over the leadership of the provincial party. He served less than a full term in Parliament, departing in February 2019.

== Return to the North West: 2020–present ==
=== Election as ANC chair: 2022 ===
As early as 2020 the media speculated that when the North West ANC elected a new leadership corps, Maloyi might make a political comeback, as a leading member of a North West ANC faction known as "N12". In 2020 and 2021, several newspapers reported on claims that several North West politicians' phones had been tapped, allegedly by intelligence operatives working for Premier Job Mokgoro. Maloyi was allegedly one of the affected politicians and the Mail & Guardian reported that he had laid criminal charges in connection with the alleged wiretap.

In March 2022, he was formally nominated to stand for election to a second term as ANC provincial chairperson. He was nominated by his local ANC branch in Tlokwe near Potchefstroom, North West. At the ANC's ninth provincial conference in the North West, held in Rustenberg in August 2022, Maloyi was elected provincial chairperson. He had run against Premier Bushy Maape and, initially, against Mahumapelo. However, shortly before the election, Mahumapelo pulled out of the race and endorsed Maloyi's candidacy. Maloyi won 370 votes against Maape's 294.

=== Culpable homicide charge ===
In 2022, during Maloyi's campaign for election as ANC provincial chairperson, some opponents – particularly in the Bojanala region of North West – argued unsuccessfully that he should be barred from contesting the position, in line with the ANC's step-aside policy, because he had previously been charged with culpable homicide. The charge was reportedly related to a 2018 car accident on the N12 which led to the death of one person. The National Prosecuting Authority had provisionally withdrawn the charge against him in May 2022, but Maloyi's opponents argued that the charge might be reinstated. Maloyi lamented that they were "trying to leverage an unfortunate situation for political gain". He said:

The ANC step-aside rule was meant to root out bad apples from the organisation and not to settle political scores. The accident was an unforeseen and unfortunate incident. It was not corruption, money laundering, or any of the criminal acts that were meant to be rooted out by the step-aside policy.

=== Return to the legislature: 2022–present ===
On 8 November 2022, Maloyi was sworn back into the North West Provincial Legislature, filling a casual vacancy caused by the resignation of Kim Medupe. On 21 November, Maape, who remained the Premier, announced a cabinet reshuffle which saw Maloyi appointed MEC for Human Settlement, Cooperative Governance and Traditional Affairs.

Following the 2024 general election, Maloyi was not amongst the interviewees for North West premier. ANC deputy provincial chairperson Lazarus Mokgosi was elected to succeed Bushy Maape. Maloyi was not appointed to Mokgosi's Executive Council.
