= Job Mokgoro =

South African politician (born 1948)

6th Premier of North West
- In office 22 June 2018 – 26 August 2021
- Preceded by: Wendy Nelson (acting); Supra Mahumapelo
- Succeeded by: Motlalepula Rosho (acting); Bushy Maape

Member of the North West Provincial Legislature
- In office 22 June 2018 – 27 August 2021

Personal details
- Born: Tebogo Job Mokgoro; 15 May 1948 (age 78) Kimberley, Cape Province, Union of South Africa
- Party: African National Congress
- Spouse: Yvonne Mokgoro (d. 2024)
- Education: University of Toledo

Tebogo Job Mokgoro (born 15 May 1948) is a South African politician and academic who served as the 6th Premier of North West from June 2018 until his resignation in August 2021. He was a Member of the North West Provincial Legislature during that time. He is a party member of the African National Congress.

== Early life, education and family ==
Job Mokgoro was born on 15 May 1948 in Kimberley in the Cape Province of the Union of South Africa. He obtained multiple administrative and academic accolades including a master's degree and an Honorary Doctorate in Public Administration from the University of Toledo.

== Career ==
After studying in the United States, Mokgoro became a lecturer at the University of Bophuthatswana. Before the 1994 election, he was one of the administrators of the Transitional Executive Council that were tasked to incorporate the traditional homelands, such as Bophuthatswana, into the new nine provinces. In 1994, Premier Popo Molefe appointed Mokgoro as the Director-General of the North West Province.

Molefe tasked Mokgoro with rationalising and integrating three government administrations into the province. During his tenure as Director-General, he was regarded as a disciplinarian, due to him patrolling the provincial government offices to make sure that no employee was leaving early on Friday afternoons. In 2014, Premier Supra Mahumapelo reappointed Mokgoro as Director-General.

Mokgoro also served as the Director-General of the South African Management Development Institute. He taught at the Wits University's Graduate School of Public and Development Management. He was also a policy analyst for the Development Bank of Southern Africa (DBSA). His most recent position was principal of the National School of Governance.

== North West Premiership ==
On 21 June 2018, the ANC Secretary-General, Ace Magashule, announced Mokgoro as the new Premier of North West after the National Working Committee (NWC) of the African National Congress selected him. His predecessor, Supra Mahumapelo, resigned in May 2018 after weeks of violent protests. Mokgoro was reportedly seen as a compromise candidate since the process of selecting a candidate was complicated.

The North West Provincial Legislature elected Mokgoro as Premier on 22 June 2018. After the 2019 general elections, speculations arose that Mokgoro was due to be replaced as Premier because of ANC factional disputes in the province. The party ended up retaining him in the post.

In January 2021, Mokgoro's ANC membership was suspended by the interim provincial committee after he voted with the opposition in the provincial legislature. In April 2021 Mail & Guardian reported that Mokgoro had refused to abide by an instruction supported by President Cyril Ramaphosa to resign. The IPC had asked him in March to resign but refused. On 30 June 2021, Mail & Guardian reported that the national working committee of the ANC had directed the IPC to give them the names of three people to replace Mokgoro as premier by the end of the week. On 17 August 2021, the ANC IPC officially announced former struggle veteran Bushy Maape as the ANC's candidate to replace Mokgoro as premier. Mokgoro then refused to resign as premier and as a member of the provincial legislature. He demanded an apology from the North West ANC IPC structure after they accused him of being responsible for the poor state of service delivery in the province, to which the IPC coordinator Hlomani Chauke apologised and thanked Mokgoro for his service. On 26 August 2021, Mokgoro resigned as premier of the North West Province after he met with ANC president Ramaphosa. He said he tried to root out corruption in the provincial government. Finance MEC Motlalepula Rosho was sworn in as acting premier later that day. Mokgoro resigned as an MPL the following day on 27 August.

== Personal life ==
Mokgoro was married to Yvonne Mokgoro, a former Constitutional Court judge who served from 1994 until 2009, until her death in 2024. They have five children.

On 7 July 2020, Mokgoro tested positive for COVID-19. He took the test after the provincial MEC for Cooperative Governance, Human Settlement and Traditional Affairs, Gordon Kegakilwe, died from complications of the virus.
