= Maureen Modiselle =

South African politician (born 1941)

Maureen Modiselle was the premier of North West Province, South Africa from 2009 until her early removal in 2010. She was born in Vryheid, on 7 February 1941. Modiselle returned to Mafikeng in 1990, after spending many years in North America and Canada. She is currently serving as the High Commissioner of South Africa to the Republic of Trinidad and Tobago.
