= Department of Small Business Development =

Department of the South African government

Department overview
- Formed: 2014
- Jurisdiction: Government of South Africa
- Minister responsible: Stella Ndabeni-Abrahams, Minister of Small Business Development
- Deputy Minister responsible: Jane Sithole, Deputy Minister of Small Business Development
- Department executive: Lindokuhle Mkhumane, Director-General
- Website: http://www.dsbd.gov.za/

The Department of Small Business Development (DSBD) is one of the ministries of the South African government. It was established in 2014 to support small businesses and cooperatives. The current political head of the department is the Minister of Small Business Development, Stella Ndabeni-Abrahams who replaced Khumbudzo Ntshavheni in 2021.

== Entities ==
- Small Enterprise Development Agency (SEDA)
- Small Enterprise Finance Agency (SEFA)
