= Stella Ndabeni-Abrahams =

South African politician

The Honourable Stella Ndabeni-Abrahams MP
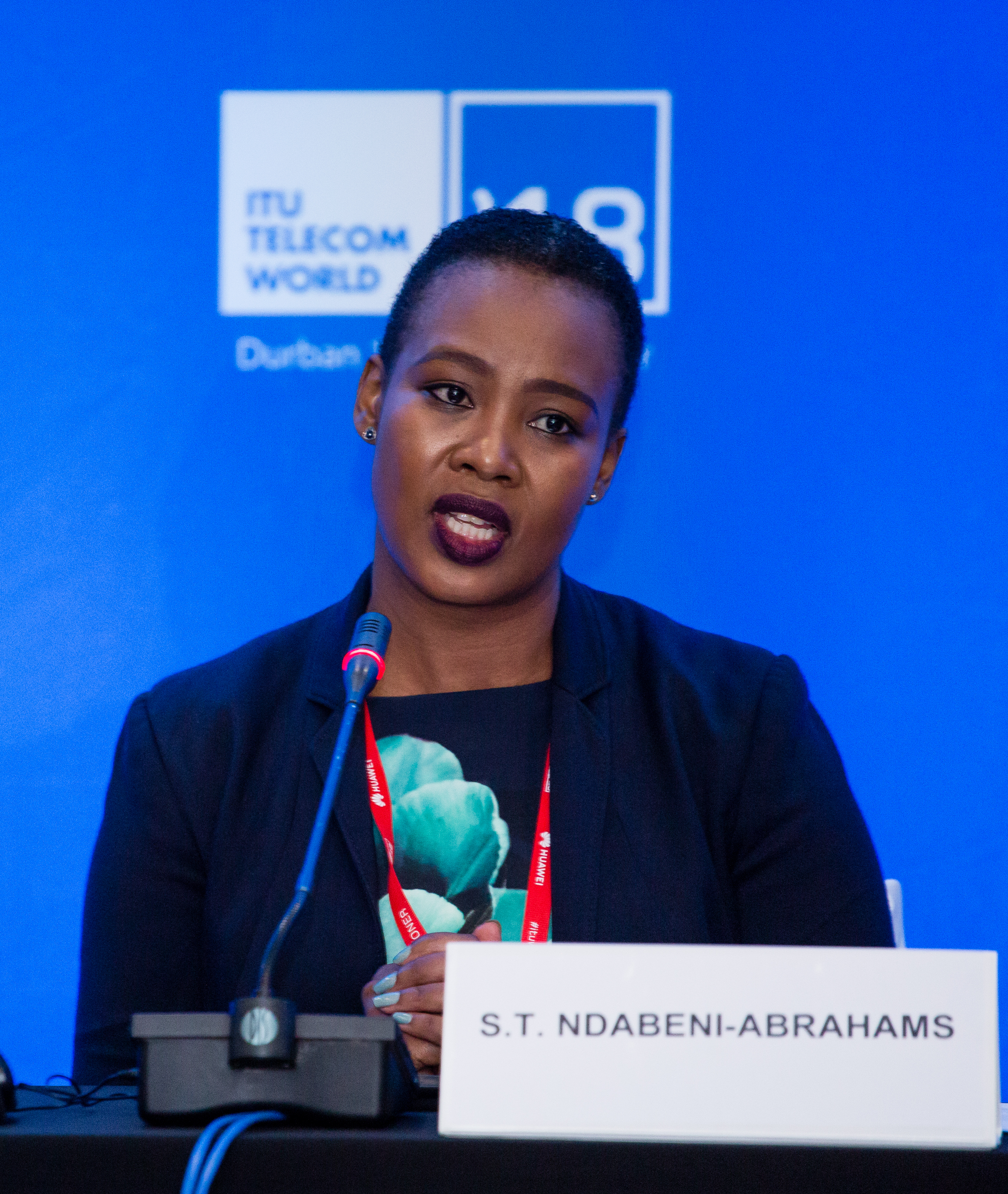
- Ndabeni-Abrahams in 2018

Minister of Small Business Development
- Incumbent
- Assumed office 5 August 2021
- President: Cyril Ramaphosa
- Deputy: Sdumo Dlamini; Dipuo Peters
- Preceded by: Khumbudzo Ntshavheni

Minister of Communications and Digital Technologies
- In office 22 November 2018 – 5 August 2021
- President: Cyril Ramaphosa
- Deputy: Pinky Kekana
- Preceded by: Siyabonga Cwele (for Telecommunications and Postal Services); Nomvula Mokonyane (for Communications)
- Succeeded by: Khumbudzo Ntshavheni

Deputy Minister of Telecommunications and Postal Services
- In office 31 March 2017 – 22 November 2018
- President: Jacob Zuma; Cyril Ramaphosa
- Minister: Siyabonga Cwele
- Preceded by: Hlengiwe Mkhize
- Succeeded by: Portfolio merged

Deputy Minister of Communications
- In office 25 October 2011 – 31 March 2017
- President: Jacob Zuma
- Minister: Dina Pule; Yunus Carrim; Faith Muthambi
- Preceded by: Obed Bapela
- Succeeded by: Tandi Mahambehlala

Member of the National Assembly
- Incumbent
- Assumed office 6 May 2009
- Constituency: Eastern Cape (2009–2019)

Personal details
- Born: Stella Tembisa Ndabeni; 30 June 1978 (age 47) Sakhela, Mthatha; Cape Province, South Africa
- Party: African National Congress
- Spouse: Thato Abrahams (m. 2012–2023)

Stella Tembisa Ndabeni-Abrahams (born 30 June 1978) is a South African politician who is currently serving as the Minister of Small Business Development since 5 August 2021. She previously served as Minister of Communications and Digital Technologies from November 2018 to August 2021. She is a member of the National Executive Committee (NEC) and a National Working Committee (NWC) of the African National Congress (ANC).

Born in the Eastern Cape, Ndabeni-Abrahams has represented the ANC in the National Assembly since May 2009. She was nominated to the assembly as an activist of the ANC Youth League; she was a member of the league's National Executive Committee from 2008 until 2010, when she fell out with the league's leadership and was expelled in a motion of no confidence. After two years as a committee whip in the National Assembly, Ndabeni-Abrahams was a deputy minister between 2011 and 2018, first as Deputy Minister of Communications and then, from 2017, as Deputy Minister of Telecommunications and Postal Services. At the time of her appointment in 2011, she was the youngest deputy minister in President Jacob Zuma's administration.

In November 2018, President Cyril Ramaphosa promoted her to his cabinet in the newly reconfigured Ministry of Communications. During her tenure in that office, she was reprimanded and sanctioned for violating COVID-19 lockdown regulations by lunching with Mduduzi Manana in April 2020. She was moved to the Ministry of Small Business Development in an August 2021 reshuffle by Ramaphosa. She has been a member of the ANC National Executive Committee since December 2022, and she was formerly a member of the party's Provincial Executive Committee in the Eastern Cape from 2012 to 2022. She is a Deputy Chairperson of the Local Government Interventions Committee and a member of the Economic Transformation Committee of the ANC National Executive Committee.

== Early life and education ==
Ndabeni-Abrahams was born on 30 June 1978 in Sakhela, a village outside Mthatha in the former Cape Province. She is the eldest of six children, and both of her parents were pastors. She attended the Holy Cross Senior Secondary School in Mthatha and later completed several tertiary diplomas.

== Early political career ==
Ndabeni-Abrahams was recruited to the African National Congress (ANC) as a marshal in 1989, while still a child. The following year, after the party was unbanned during the negotiations to end apartheid, she joined the ANC Youth League (ANCYL) in Mthatha East.

Upon leaving high school, she got her first job as an administrator in the provincial government of the Eastern Cape. Then, from 2003 to 2009, she was a project manager for the Eastern Cape Socio-Economic Consultative Council, working on HIV/AIDS support programmes for local municipalities. During this period, she rose through the ranks of the ANCYL: she was a member of the league's regional executive committee in Mthatha from 1999 to 2001, and in 2008 she was elected to the league's provincial executive committee in the Eastern Cape. Later the same year, in April 2008, she was elected to the ANCYL National Executive Committee, at a league elective conference which also elected Julius Malema as ANCYL president.

== Entrance to national politics ==
=== National Assembly backbenches: 2009–2011 ===
In the 2009 general election, Ndabeni-Abrahams was elected for the first time to a seat in the National Assembly, the lower house of the South African Parliament. She represented the ANC in the Eastern Cape constituency. In addition, after the election, the ANC appointed her as its whip in the Portfolio Committee on Defence and Military Veterans.

During this period, on 16 July 2010, Ndabeni-Abrahams was expelled from the ANCYL National Executive Committee. Her expulsion was effected by a motion of no confidence without any formal disciplinary proceedings, and it was part of a wave of action against ANCYL members, also including Lehlogonolo Masoga, who were perceived as antagonistic to the leadership of league president Malema and his allies. In particular, the league accused Ndabeni-Abrahams of having lied in an affidavit she submitted in Masoga's lawsuit against the league; in the affidavit, she claimed that Malema's allies had conspired to ordain Masoga's expulsion from the ANCYL. She later said that, "I was expelled because I like to challenge the status quo". Her fall-out with the Malema-led ANCYL leadership was viewed as having put her in political alignment with President Jacob Zuma, who was also at odds with the league.

In January 2011, the ANC's parliamentary caucus was reshuffled and Ndabeni-Abrahams was appointed as the party's whip in the Portfolio Committee on Communications. Her tenure in this position coincided with public controversy about the Secrecy Bill, handled by her committee, and she spoke in favour of a highly controversial ANC proposal to establish a statutory media appeals tribunal to regulate and hold "accountable" the South African press.

=== Deputy Minister of Communications: 2011–2017 ===
On 24 October 2011, President Zuma announced a wide-ranging cabinet reshuffle, in which Ndabeni-Abrahams was promoted to succeed Obed Bapela as Deputy Minister of Communications under newly appointed Minister Dina Pule. She was the youngest deputy minister in the national executive, quickly became known as an avid user of social media, and was one of the Mail & Guardian's 200 Young South Africans in 2011. In July 2013, Pule was replaced as minister by Yunus Carrim after a misconduct scandal. In parallel to her government office, Ndabeni-Abrahams served as a member of the Provincial Executive Committee of the ANC's Eastern Cape branch, having gained election to the committee for the first time in 2012.

In the 2014 general election, Ndabeni-Abrahams was re-elected to the National Assembly, ranked seventh on the ANC's Eastern Cape party list. Announcing his second-term cabinet, Zuma also announced a reconfiguration in the communications portfolio; a Ministry of Telecommunications and Postal Services was established, while the Ministry of Communications was now responsible for "overarching communication policy and strategy", including leadership of the Independent Communications Authority (ICASA), the South African Broadcasting Corporation (SABC), and the Government Communication and Information System. Ndabeni-Abrahams was re-appointed as Deputy Minister of Communications, now under Minister Faith Muthambi.

In the reconfigured ministry, Ndabeni-Abrahams was given three main responsibilities: the transformation of print media, commissioning government content for the SABC, and managing the relationship between the department and the radio sector. However, in October 2016, Ndabeni-Abrahams told the Sunday Times that she had written to President Zuma to complain that she and Minister Muthambi had "no working relationship" and that Muthambi sidelined her and treated her "like a PA". She also said that she had resolved to stop attending government events involving Muthambi, including the June 2016 budget vote in Parliament.

=== Deputy Minister of Telecommunications and Postal Services: 2017–2018 ===
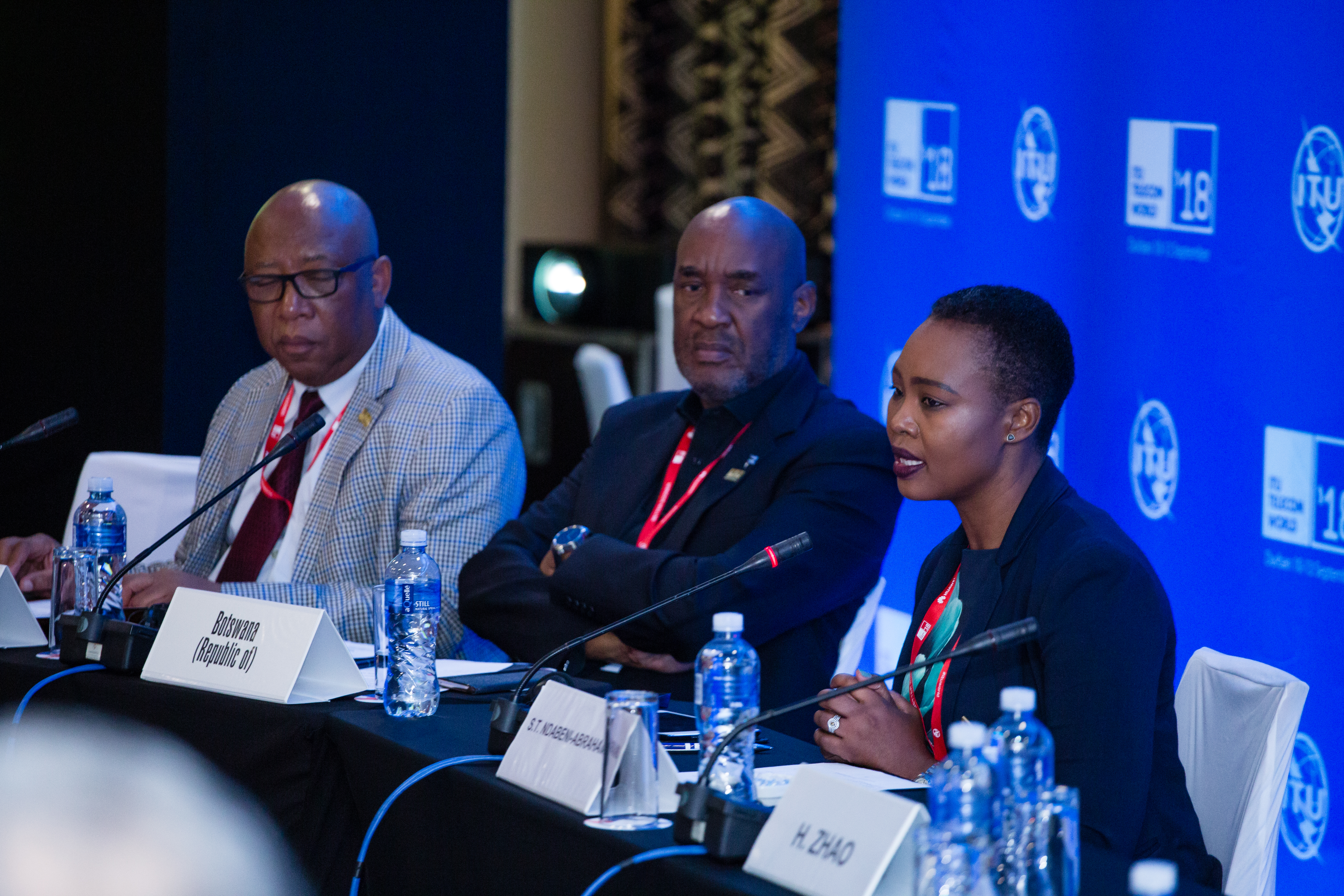
Ndabeni-Abrahams with Thesele Maseribane and Kitso Mokaila during a ministerial roundtable at ITU Telecom World 2018 in Durban

Just after midnight in the early hours of 31 March 2017, Zuma announced a controversial reshuffle in which Ndabeni-Abrahams was moved to the other wing of the communications portfolio: she succeeded Hlengiwe Mkhize as Deputy Minister of Telecommunications and Postal Services, under Minister Siyabonga Cwele, while Tandi Mahambehlala succeeded Ndabeni-Abrahams in the Ministry of Communications.

==== Nasrec conference ====
Formerly viewed as a political ally of President Zuma, in 2017 Ndabeni-Abrahams became a prominent supporter of Deputy President Cyril Ramaphosa, who was elected as ANC president at the party's 54th National Conference in December 2017. According to Mondli Makhanya, she was perceived as "a key cog in the Ramaphosa machinery" and impressed Ramaphosa personally. Ramaphosa retained her as deputy minister when he took office as President of South Africa in February 2018.

==== Yekani allegation ====
An East London-based businessman, Siphiwe Cele, later claimed that, in April 2018, Ndabeni-Abrahams's husband had attempted to buy a controlling R1-billion stake in his electronics manufacturing company, Yekani Manufacturing. Cele alleged that his refusal to accept the offer, which was proffered while Ndabeni-Abrahams was deputy minister, had ultimately led his company into liquidation, because the Eastern Cape Government had subsequently declined to offer financial assistance to Yekani. His allegations were published in the Sunday Times in January 2020, after Ndabeni-Abrahams had been promoted to the cabinet.

In response, Ndabeni-Abrahams's spokesperson said that it was "disingenuous to blame the minister's husband for the challenges faced by Yekani". Yekani later distanced itself from the report, saying that it took "full responsibility" for its difficulties and did not blame Ndabeni-Abrahams and her husband.

== Minister of Communications: 2018–2021 ==
On 22 November 2018, Ramaphosa appointed Ndabeni-Abrahams as Minister of Communications in his cabinet. Her promotion was the most significant change in an otherwise minor reshuffle, and the press anointed her "a rising star" in the ANC.

Ramaphosa also announced that the communications portfolio would be re-unified, with Ndabeni-Abrahams's ministry absorbing the Ministry of Telecommunications and Postal Services, in a move to ensure "better alignment and co-ordination of matters that are of importance to our economy". The two departments, the Department of Communications and Department of Telecommunications and Postal Services, would remain administratively separate, both under Ndabeni-Abrahams's political leadership, until the end of the legislative term, when they were merged as the Department of Communications and Digital Technologies. Ndabeni-Abrahams remained in office to oversee the merger: in the 2019 general election, she was re-elected to the National Assembly, ranked 27th on the ANC's national party list, and she was re-appointed as Minister of Communications in Ramaphosa's second-term cabinet.

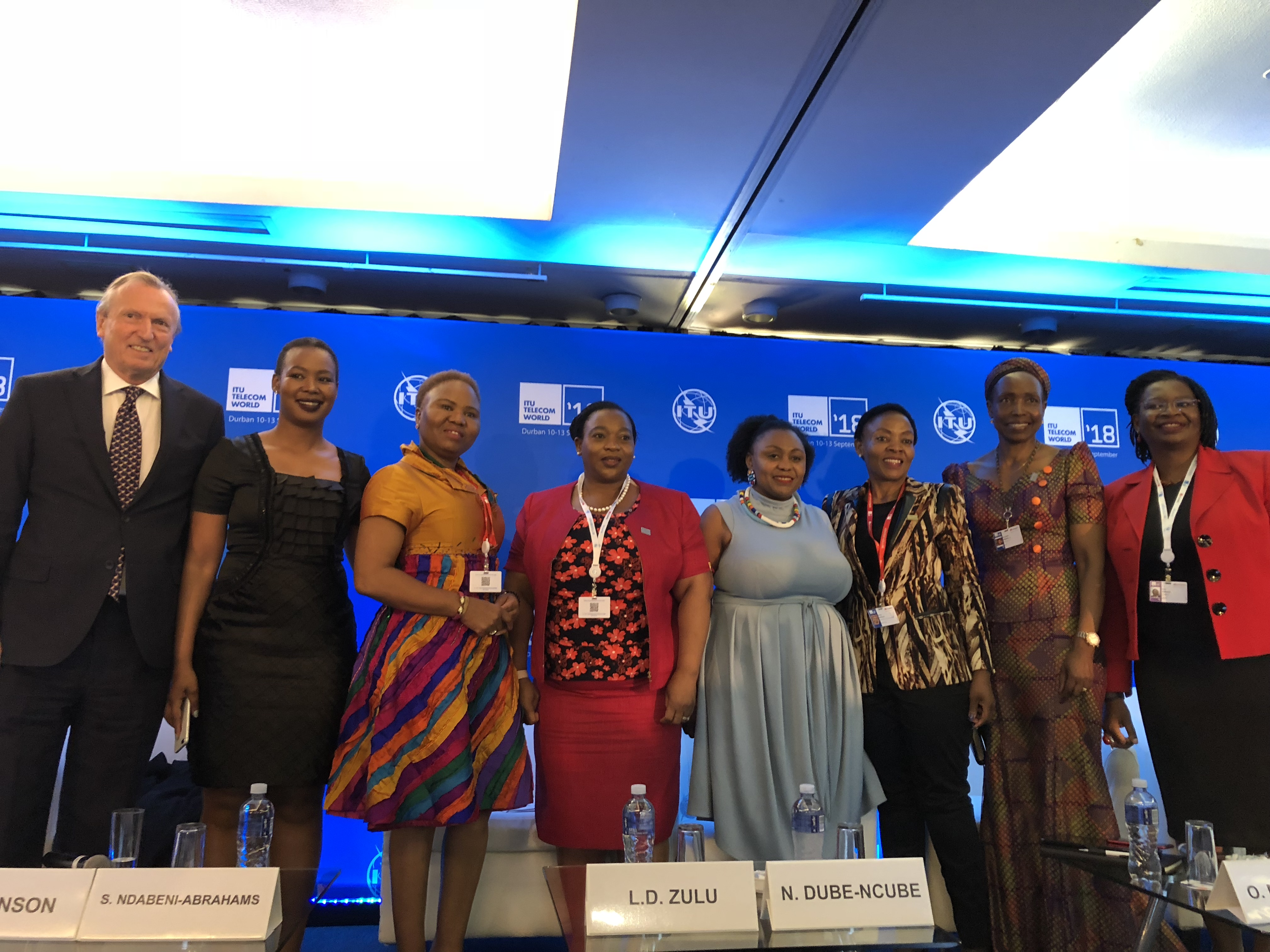
Ndabeni-Abrahams (second from left) with Malcolm Johnson, Lindiwe Zulu, Nomusa Dube-Ncube, and others at ITU World 2018

The Mail & Guardian commended Ndabeni-Abrahams's "exuberance" and "gusto" in the portfolio. She styled herself as "the commander of the fourth industrial revolution", a moniker she had earlier claimed during her tenure as telecommunications deputy minister, and Ramaphosa appointed her at the head of the Presidential 4IR Commission, a policy advisory body. Indeed, Ndabeni-Abrahams said that the central thrust of the newly unified portfolio was to reconfigure the mandates of state agencies in alignment with Ramaphosa's drive to leverage the fourth industrial revolution. However, upon Ndabeni-Abrahams's exit from the portfolio in 2021, the Mail & Guardian said that after over two years in the ministry, she had "nothing to show for it".

=== Internet penetration ===
Ndabeni-Abrahams's performance agreement included various commitments related to an undertaking to improve internet penetration in South Africa to 80 per cent by 2024. Among other things, her targets included reducing the cost of mobile data by 50 per cent and, as promised by Ramaphosa in his 2019 State of the Nation Address, facilitating the allocation and licensing of broadband spectrum by ICASA. During her term in the ministry, her critics claimed that she "was treading dangerously close to the realm of putting undue political influence" on ICASA, and she was also criticised for delays in the spectrum licensing process.

=== Altercation with SABC journalists ===
On 9 February 2019, Ndabeni-Abrahams attended an ANC event in Mount Frere, Eastern Cape for the launch of the provincial party's manifesto ahead of the upcoming general election. During the keynote address by Paul Mashatile, the event was interrupted by service-delivery protesters. Ndabeni-Abrahams was accused of attempting to block video journalists from covering the protests: footage aired on SABC showed her covering the camera lens with her hand, and she was quoted as asking one journalist, "Why would you give coverage to people who are out of order?" Facing public criticism, Ndabeni-Abrahams released a statement on her official Twitter account, in which she said:

I would like to offer my sincere apology for an earlier altercation with some members of the media during the ANC provincial rally in Mount Frere whilst trying to stop the singing comrades. I wish to assure the media and South Africans at large of my unreserved commitment to media freedom. I sincerely regret the incident.

Ferial Haffajee accused Ndabeni-Abrahams of "an abuse of power and an act of censorship commonly used by thugs in totalitarian states and in democratatorships", while Zakes Mda warned her not to "imagine herself Lady Legatee of the public broadcaster". The South African National Editors' Forum (SANEF) also expressed concern, given Ndabeni-Abrahams's ministerial role in oversight of the SABC. In the week that followed, Ndabeni-Abrahams met with SANEF, which reported that she had "unreservedly apologised" and committed to working with SANEF "to protect journalists against attempts to intimidate them in an increasingly hostile environment."

=== COVID-19 lockdown violation ===
During the first fortnight of the national COVID-19 lockdown in South Africa, Ndabeni-Abrahams was photographed at a lunch with several other people, apparently in contravention of the lockdown regulations. The photograph (later deleted) was posted on 7 April 2020 on the Instagram page of politician Mduduzi Manana, who captioned the post, "It was great to host a former colleague and dear sister Cde Stella Ndabeni-Abrahams (Minister of Communications and Digital Technologies) on her way back from executing critical and essential services required for the effective functioning of our country during the nationwide lockdown." The post went viral on social media.

Later on 7 April, Manana apologised in a statement for creating the "impression" that Ndabeni-Abrahams had attended a "social lunch", explaining that she had visited his house to organise donations of personal protective equipment by his charitable foundation. The following day, the Presidency announced that Ndabeni-Abrahams had been summoned to a meeting with President Ramaphosa, where she had been reprimanded and ordered to issue a public apology. She was placed on special leave for two months, with her salary docked for one month. According to the statement, "The President accepted the Minister's apology for the violation but was unmoved by mitigating factors she tendered."

Ndabeni-Abrahams subsequently released a brief video statement, in which she admitted to and apologised for breaching the lockdown regulations. Minister in the Presidency Jackson Mthembu filled her ministerial office during her two-month leave. In addition, later in April, the National Prosecuting Authority pursued a criminal charge against Ndabeni-Abrahams for contravention of the Disaster Management Act regulations; she paid a R1,000 admission of guilt fine, thereby incurring a criminal record for the offence.

== Minister of Small Business Development: 2021–present ==
On 5 August 2021, President Ramaphosa reshuffled the national executive and appointed Ndabeni-Abrahams as Minister of Small Business Development, with Sdumo Dlamini as her deputy. She traded portfolios with Khumbudzo Ntshavheni, who took over as Minister of Communications and Digital Technologies. Ndabeni said that, under her leadership and in line with the National Development Plan, the ministry would pursue job creation and growth in small businesses, including by improving the ease of doing business through reduced red tape. In 2022, the ministry gazetted the National Integrated Small Enterprise Development Plan, a 10-year strategic plan for supporting small businesses.

In May 2022, at a provincial party elective conference in Buffalo City, Ndabeni-Abrahams was re-elected to the Provincial Executive Committee of the ANC's Eastern Cape branch, ranked sixth by popularity among the 30 ordinary members of the committee. In December that year, at the ANC's 55th National Conference, she was elected to a five-year term as a member of the ANC National Executive Committee. By number of votes received, she was the 14th-most popular candidate of the 80 ordinary members elected to the committee. She was also elected to the National Working Committee.

== Personal life ==
She married Thato Abrahams in Mthatha in 2012. She has three children and is Christian.
