= Hlengiwe Mkhize =

South African politician (1952–2021)

The Honourable Hlengiwe Mkhize MP
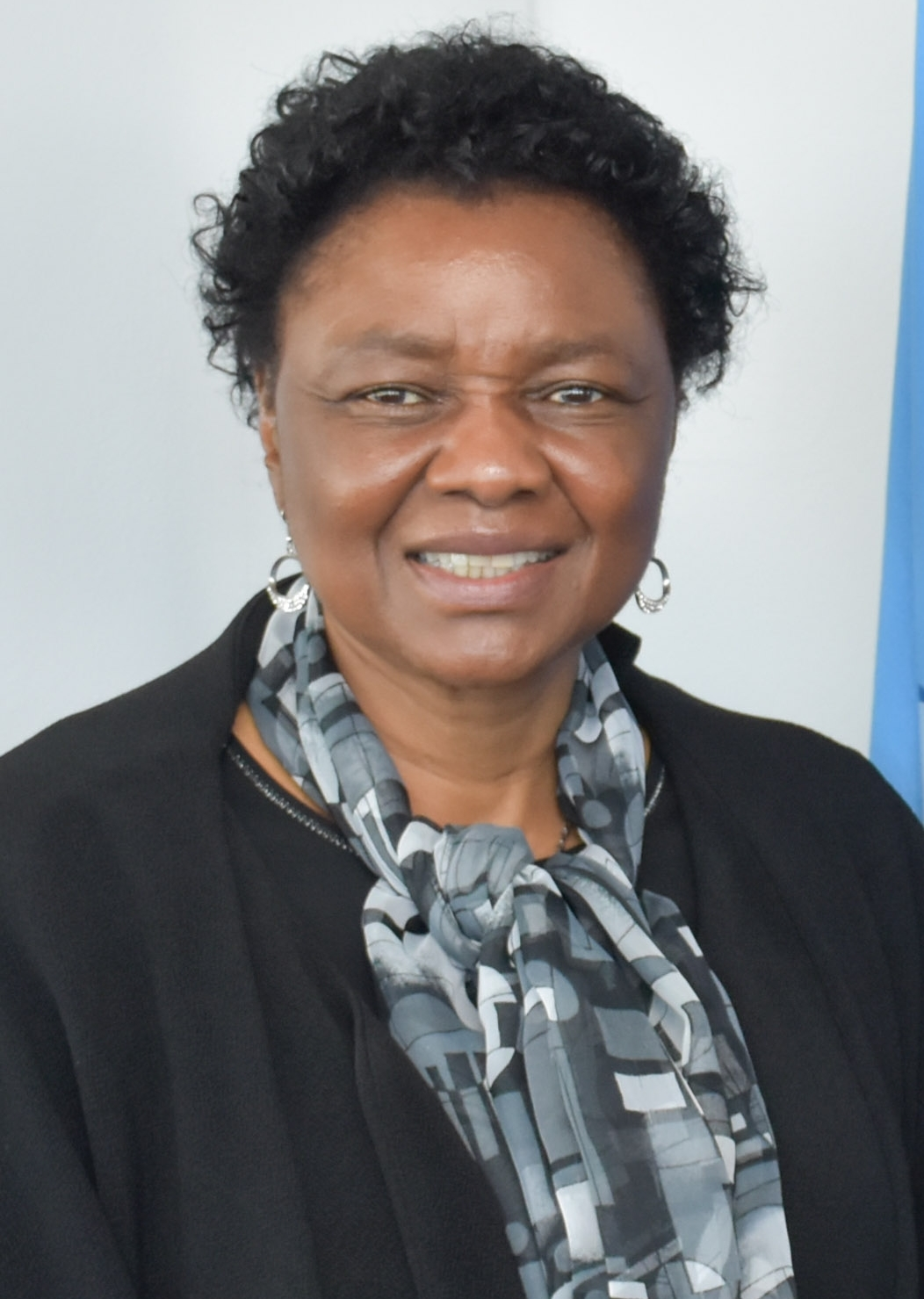
- Mkhize in 2016

Deputy Minister in the Presidency for Women, Youth and Persons with Disabilities
- In office 30 May 2019 – 16 September 2021
- President: Cyril Ramaphosa
- Minister: Maite Nkoana-Mashabane
- Succeeded by: Sisisi Tolashe

Minister of Higher Education and Training
- In office 17 October 2017 – 26 February 2018
- President: Jacob Zuma; Cyril Ramaphosa
- Deputy: Buti Manamela
- Preceded by: Blade Nzimande
- Succeeded by: Naledi Pandor

Minister of Home Affairs
- In office 31 March 2017 – 17 October 2017
- President: Jacob Zuma
- Deputy: Fatima Chohan
- Preceded by: Malusi Gigaba
- Succeeded by: Ayanda Dlodlo

Member of the National Assembly
- In office 6 May 2009 – 16 September 2021

National Treasurer of the African National Congress Women's League
- In office July 2008 – August 2015
- President: Angie Motshekga
- Preceded by: predecessor
- Succeeded by: Maite Nkoana-Mashabane

Vice-President of the Assembly of States Parties of the International Criminal Court
- In office 2005–2008
- Appointed by: Assembly of States Parties
Other offices (2009–2017)
Deputy Minister of Telecommunications and Postal Services
In office 26 May 2014 – 31 March 2017
President	Jacob Zuma
Minister	Siyabonga Cwele
Preceded by	Portfolio established
Succeeded by	Stella Ndabeni-Abrahams
Deputy Minister of Economic Development
In office 12 June 2012 – 26 May 2014
President	Jacob Zuma
Minister	Ebrahim Patel
Preceded by	Enoch Godongwana
Succeeded by	Madala Masuku
Deputy Minister of Higher Education and Training
In office 31 October 2010 – 12 June 2012
President	Jacob Zuma
Minister	Blade Nzimande
Succeeded by	Mduduzi Manana
Deputy Minister of Correctional Services
In office 11 May 2009 – 31 October 2010
President	Jacob Zuma
Minister	Nosiviwe Mapisa-Nqakula
Preceded by	Loretta Jacobus
Succeeded by	Ngoako Ramathlodi

Personal details
- Born: 6 September 1952
- Died: 16 September 2021 (aged 69) Johannesburg, South Africa
- Citizenship: South African
- Party: African National Congress
- Spouse: Pat Mkhize
- Education: University of Zululand; University of Natal

Hlengiwe Buhle Mkhize (6 September 1952 – 16 September 2021) was a South African politician who served as Minister of Higher Education and Training and Minister of Home Affairs under President Jacob Zuma. A member of the National Assembly and national executive since May 2009, she was Deputy Minister in the Presidency for Women, Youth and Persons with Disabilities when she died in September 2021.

Mkhize trained in clinical psychology and spent over a decade in academia at the University of Zululand and University of the Witwatersrand, until in 1995 she was appointed to the Truth and Reconciliation Commission. She chaired the commission's Reparations and Rehabilitation Committee. She went on to serve as South African Ambassador to the Netherlands from 2005 to 2008 before she was elected to the National Assembly in the 2009 general election.

Between 2009 and 2017, Mkhize served Zuma's administration as a deputy minister in four different portfolios: she was Deputy Minister of Correctional Services from 2009 to 2010, Deputy Minister of Higher Education and Training from 2010 to 2012, Deputy Minister of Economic Development from 2012 to 2014, and Deputy Minister of Telecommunications and Postal Services from 2014 to 2017. After that, she was promoted to Zuma's second-term cabinet, first as Minister of Home Affairs in 2017 and then as Minister of Higher Education and Training from 2017 to 2018. In February 2018, she was sacked by Zuma's successor, President Cyril Ramaphosa, and she retreated briefly to the chairmanship of the Portfolio Committee on Communications. She was appointed to her deputy ministerial position in the Presidency after the 2019 general election.

A longserving member of the African National Congress (ANC), Mkhize was the national treasurer of the ANC Women's League from July 2008 to August 2015. She was a member of the party's National Executive Committee from December 2017 until her death.

== Early life and education ==
Mkhize was born on 6 September 1952. In 1976, she completed a Bachelor of Arts in psychology, social work, and sociology from the University of Zululand, where she was involved in student activism. She went on to complete two postgraduate degrees at the University of Natal: an Honours in psychology in 1978, and a Master's in clinical psychology in 1981.

== Career in academia and activism ==
Mkhize spent over a decade in academia: she was a senior lecturer at the University of Zululand from 1984 to 1990 and then a senior lecturer at the University of the Witwatersrand from 1990 to 1995. During that period, she was also a visiting professor at the University of Illinois and University of Mississippi.

After leaving teaching, she held a series of varied posts in civil society and non-profit organisations. Most notably, from 1995 to 2003, she was a commissioner of the Truth and Reconciliation Commission and the chairperson of the commission's Reparations and Rehabilitation Committee. She also established the National Children and Violence Trust, worked as a reparations officer in the President's Fund in the Ministry of Justice, chaired the board of the South African branch of Transparency International, and chaired the council of the University of Zululand. Mkhize also had various business interests; by the time that she joined the government in 2009, she was a director in 15 private companies, including Aerosud.

Through much of her career in civil society, Mkhize was also an active member of the African National Congress (ANC), the post-apartheid governing party. From 1991 to 2004, she served continuously as a member of the executive of her local ANC branch – from 1991 to 1995 in Diepsloot; from 1995 to 2000 in Sandton; and from 2001 to 2004 in Havana City, Fourways, where she was branch secretary as well as chairperson of the local ANC Women's League.

=== Ambassador to the Netherlands: 2005–2008 ===
In 2005, President Thabo Mbeki appointed Mkhize as South African Ambassador to the Netherlands, a post she held until 2008. In this capacity, she chaired the executive council of the Organisation for the Prohibition of Chemical Weapons during the early 2000s and was vice-president of the Member States at the International Criminal Court from 2006 to 2008.

=== Treasurer of the ANC Women's League: 2008–2015 ===
On 6 July 2008 in Bloemfontein, Mkhize was elected as National Treasurer of the ANC Women's League. She served under Angie Motshekga, who was elected as league president at the same elective conference. She remained in the treasury for a single extended term, which lasted until August 2015 due to delays in holding the next elective conference. She said that she raised more than R40-million in funds for the ANC Women's League during her tenure. In 2015, she did not stand for re-election, and she was succeeded as treasurer by Maite Nkoana-Mashabane.

== Career in government ==
=== Deputy Minister: 2009–2017 ===
She was first elected to the National Assembly of South Africa in the April 2009 general election, representing the ANC. She served in the assembly until her death in 2021, gaining re-election in 2014 and 2019. In addition, after the 2009 election, she was appointed as a deputy minister under the cabinet of newly elected President Jacob Zuma, who named her as Deputy Minister of Correctional Services under Minister Nosiviwe Mapisa-Nqakula. Mkhize was viewed as a political supporter and ally of Zuma.

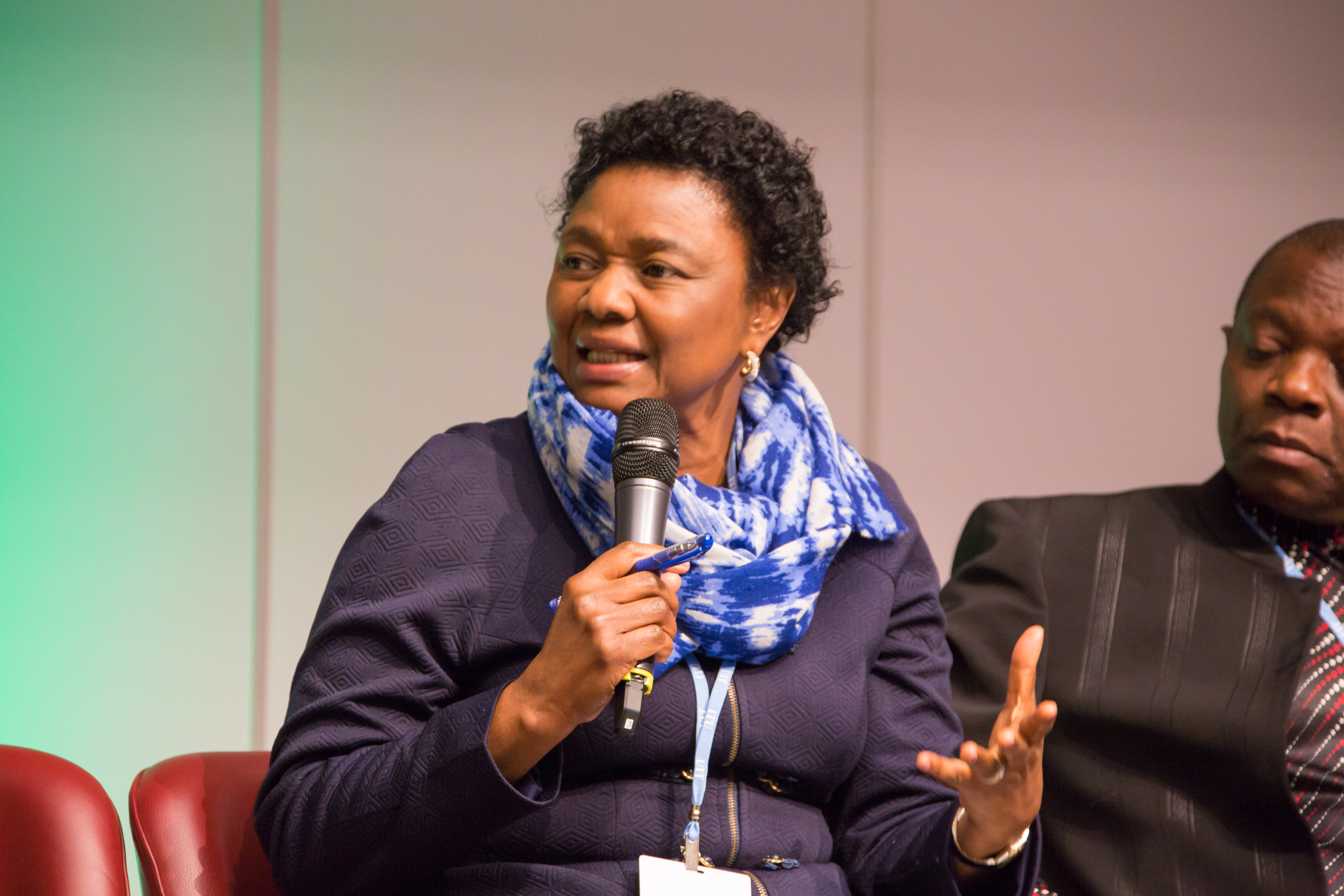
Mkhize at the World Summit on the Information Society in May 2016

In a reshuffle announced on 31 October 2010, Mkhize was appointed as Deputy Minister of Higher Education and Training, under Minister Blade Nzimande. She served in that position until 12 June 2012, when she was appointed to succeed Enoch Godongwana as Deputy Minister of Economic Development under Minister Ebrahim Patel. Finally, in her fourth and final deputy ministerial position in Zuma's administration, she was appointed as Deputy Minister of Telecommunications and Postal Services when that portfolio was established after the 2014 general election.

=== Minister of Home Affairs: 2017 ===
Late on 30 March 2017, Zuma announced another cabinet reshuffle in which Mkhize was promoted to his second-term cabinet, succeeding Malusi Gigaba as Minister of Home Affairs. Early in her tenure as minister, Mkhize attracted media attention for defending her predecessor's controversial decision to grant South African citizenship to members of the Gupta family, a decision that critics claimed amounted to unfair preferential treatment. Also controversial was Mkhize's decision to place Mkuseli Apleni, the director-general of the Department of Home Affairs, on precautionary suspension. Apleni said that she did not have proper grounds for the suspension and threatened to sue the ministry, while the Select Committee on Social Services raised its own doubts about the decision.

=== Minister of Higher Education and Training: 2017–2018 ===
Mkhize spent less than a year in the home affairs portfolio before, on 17 October 2017, she was appointed as Minister of Higher Education and Training, succeeding her former boss, Blade Nzimande. While she was serving in this office, Mkhize attended the ANC's 54th National Conference, at which she was elected to a five-year term as a member of the party's National Executive Committee. By number of votes received, she was ranked 73rd of the committee's 80 ordinary members.

=== Portfolio committees: 2018–2019 ===
On 26 February 2018, Mkhize was sacked from the cabinet by Cyril Ramaphosa, who had recently succeeded Zuma as president. She was replaced by Naledi Pandor and retreated to the backbenches of the National Assembly, where she spent several months as an ordinary member of the Portfolio Committee on Basic Education and Portfolio Committee on International Relations and Cooperation. On 6 November 2018, she was elected to chair the Portfolio Committee on Communications after the former chairperson, Humphrey Maxegwana, became chair of the Joint Committee on Ethics and Members' Interest. She remained in the chair until after the May 2019 general election.

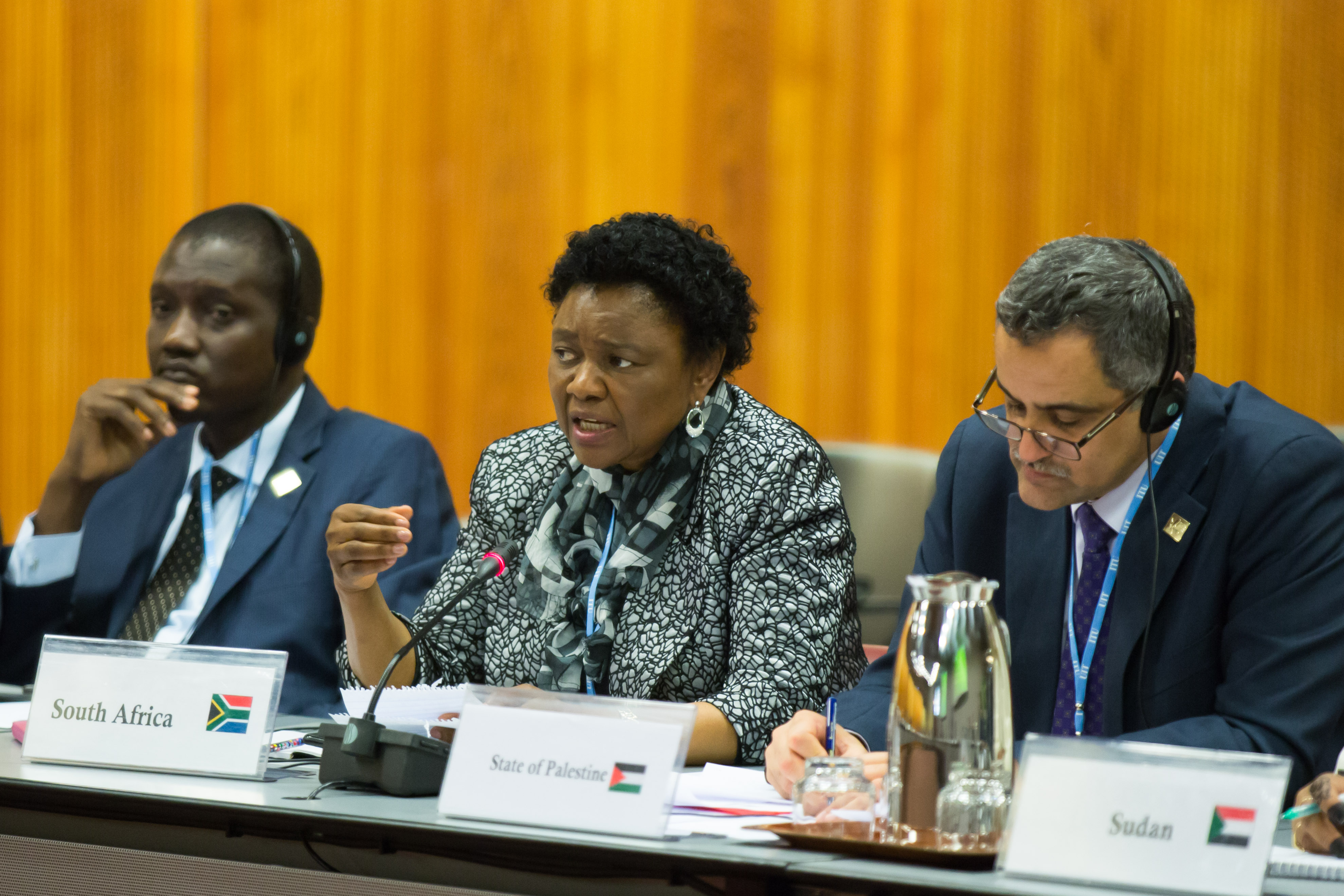
Mkhize in May 2016 at a ministerial roundtable with Yaya Abdoul Kane and Allam Mousa

=== Deputy Minister in the Presidency: 2019–2021 ===
Pursuant to the 2019 general election, Ramaphosa appointed Mkhize as Deputy Minister in the Presidency for Women, Youth and Persons with Disabilities. She deputised Minister Maite Nkoana-Mashabane. She served in the office until her death in 2021, making her last parliamentary appearance on 19 August 2021 when she cast her vote to elect Nosiviwe Mapisa-Nqakula as the Speaker of the National Assembly.

== Personal life and death ==
Mkhize was diagnosed with lung cancer in March 2017, and she was hospitalised on 31 August 2021. She died in hospital in Johannesburg on 16 December 2021, aged 69. President Ramaphosa granted her an official funeral.

She was married to Pat Mkhize. They had four children – three daughters and a son – and a grandson. She was also the chairperson of the June and Andrew Mlangeni Foundation.
