= Khumbudzo Ntshavheni =

South African politician

The Honourable Khumbudzo Ntshavheni MP
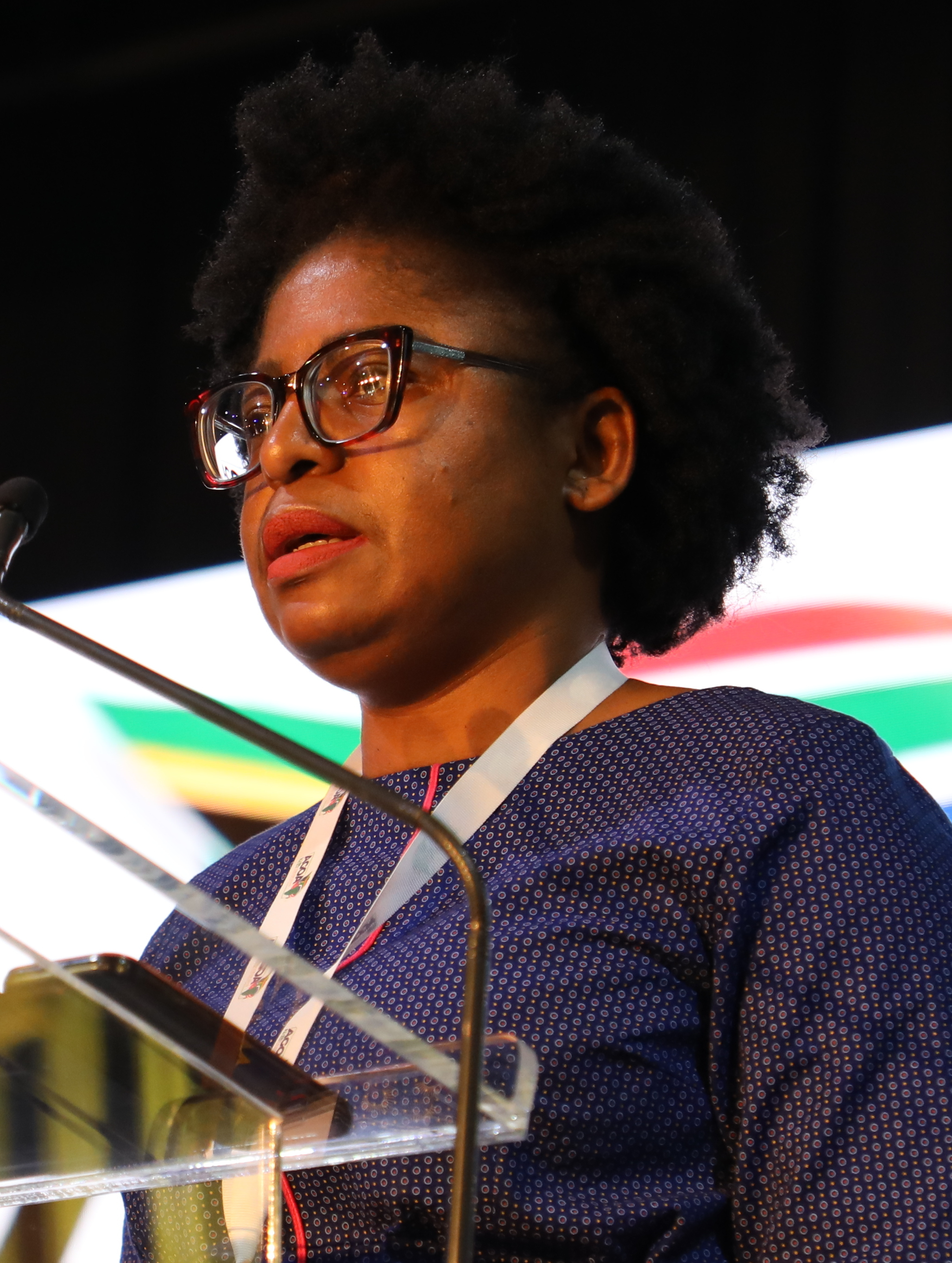
- Ntshavheni in 2023

Minister in the Presidency
- Incumbent
- Assumed office 6 March 2023
- President: Cyril Ramaphosa
- Deputy: Nomasonto Motaung; Kenneth Morolong
- Preceded by: Mondli Gungubele
- In office 28 January 2021 – 5 August 2021 (acting)
- President: Cyril Ramaphosa
- Preceded by: Jackson Mthembu
- Succeeded by: Mondli Gungubele

Minister of Communications and Digital Technologies
- In office 5 August 2021 – 6 March 2023
- President: Cyril Ramaphosa
- Deputy: Philly Mapulane
- Preceded by: Stella Ndabeni-Abrahams
- Succeeded by: Mondli Gungubele

Minister of Small Business Development
- In office 29 May 2019 – 4 August 2021
- President: Cyril Ramaphosa
- Deputy: Rosemary Capa
- Preceded by: Lindiwe Zulu
- Succeeded by: Stella Ndabeni-Abrahams

Member of the National Assembly
- Incumbent
- Assumed office 22 May 2019

Personal details
- Born: Khumbudzo Phophi Silence Ntshavheni; 30 January 1977 (age 49) Sibasa, Transvaal; South Africa
- Party: African National Congress
- Education: Mbilwi Secondary School
- Alma mater: Rand Afrikaans University; Bradford University

Khumbudzo Phophi Silence Ntshavheni (born 30 January 1977) is a South African politician who is currently serving as Minister in the Presidency since March 2023. She was formerly the Minister of Communications and Digital Technologies from 2021 to 2023 and the Minister of Small Business Development from 2019 to 2021. She is a member of the African National Congress (ANC).

Born in Limpopo, Ntshavheni served in the leadership of the ANC Youth League and later as a campaign manager on Cyril Ramaphosa's CR17 campaign. She worked in business and public administration until the May 2019 general election, when she was elected to the National Assembly and appointed to Ramaphosa's cabinet. She has been a member of the ANC National Executive Committee since December 2022.

== Early life and education ==
Ntshavheni was born on 30 January 1977 in Sibasa in the former Transvaal Province. Her mother worked in the taxi industry, while her father owned a general dealer's store. She matriculated at Mbilwi Secondary School in Sibasa. As a teenager during the late apartheid period and post-apartheid transition, she was active in youth activism in the Northern Transvaal, including through the South African Youth Congress and Congress of South African Students. In her retelling, she met Nelson Mandela as a 14-year-old, during the Convention for a Democratic South Africa, and attempted to persuade him to support a lower voting age of 16.

After high school, Ntshavheni attended the Rand Afrikaans University, where she completed an undergraduate degree in political science and, in 1999, two Honours degrees, one in development studies and another in labour relations. In 2008, she obtained a Master of Business Administration from Bradford University in the United Kingdom.

== Career in business and administration ==
She began her career as a junior lecturer at the University of South Africa and then entered the public service as spokesperson to the Premier of Limpopo, Ngoako Ramatlhodi. She went on to hold several different positions in the Limpopo government, including as a manager at Trade and Investment Limpopo and as chief information officer in the provincial department of local government and housing. From April 2008 to November 2010, she was the municipal manager of Limpopo's Ba-Phalaborwa Local Municipality.

In 2010, Ntshavheni was appointed as the chief operating officer at the State Information Technology Agency (Sita). However, she and several other executives were placed on precautionary suspension in July 2013, reportedly in connection with an irregular tender award. By 2014, she had left Sita; Minister of Telecommunications Siyabonga Cwele later reported that she had received a R1.9-million executive settlement. She later argued that her departure from Sita had received skewed coverage in the media.

In August 2014, the Ministry of Trade and Industry appointed Ntshavheni to an advisory panel on black industrialisation, and in July 2015, Public Enterprises Minister Lynne Brown appointed her to a three-year period as a non-executive director on the board of Denel, the state-owned arms manufacturer. Her tenure on the board coincided with a tumultuous period at Denel, under the chairmanship of Daniel Mantsha, which was later the subject of public inquiries.

Concurrently, Ntshavheni had several business interests, including in transport, consumer goods, and agriculture; she later described herself as having been a "serial entrepreneur". She was the founding director and chairwoman of Nkho Trading, which worked in the transport and property development sectors.

== Early career in the African National Congress ==
=== ANC Youth League ===
While she pursued her career in business and public administration, Ntshavheni was an active member of the African National Congress (ANC), the governing party of South Africa. In April 2013, she was appointed to a 22-person national task team, led by Mzwandile Masina, that was tasked with rebuilding the ANC Youth League after its incumbent leadership corps was disbanded. She also served on the league's National Executive Committee. She was also elected to the Provincial Executive Committee of the ANC's Limpopo branch, and she served as the branch's spokesperson from 2015 until 2018, when she failed to gain re-election to the provincial executive.

=== CR17 campaign ===
Ahead of the ANC's 54th National Conference in December 2017, Ntshavheni was recruited to Cyril Ramaphosa's winning party presidential campaign, nicknamed CR17. With Thembi Siweya, she managed Ramaphosa's campaign in her home province of Limpopo, where Ramaphosa himself had substantial personal ties.

== Minister of Small Business Development: 2019–2021 ==
In the 2019 general election, Ntshavheni was elected to a seat in the National Assembly, the lower house of the South African Parliament. She was ranked 97th on the ANC's national party list. After the election, President Ramaphosa appointed her to his second cabinet, where she succeeded Lindiwe Zulu as Minister of Small Business Development. Rosemary Capa was appointed as her deputy. Ntshavheni, calling herself a "third-generation small-business entrepreneur", said that her experience in business equipped her to lead the ministry. She said that she viewed her new position as "an opportunity to do for SMEs what I wished someone did for my business", including by reducing red tape, expanding market access, and promoting financial management skills.

=== CR17 allegations ===
In August 2019, the Sunday Independent published an exposé about the use of CR17 campaign funds to reimburse politicians and strategists during the campaign. The newspaper claimed to have seen leaked campaign records that showed, among other things, that R5 million had been paid to Ntshavheni through a company called Phore Farms, where she had formerly been managing director. A follow-up report claimed further that Ntshavheni had used a portion of the money to buy a luxury car and build a mansion in Thohoyandou for her mother. Other portions of the money had allegedly been used to pay local party branches against the elections.

Ntshavheni strongly denied the allegation that she had used the campaign funds for personal benefit, which her spokesperson called "mere rumour-mongering". Among other things, Ntshavheni said that the Thohoyandou house had been in the family since 2010 and that she had not bought any new cars since 2016. In respect of allusions to a sexual relationship between her and Risimati Hlongwane, a CR17 coordinator in Vhembe, she accused the newspaper of patriarchal "gutter journalism"; and she strongly rejected suggestions that she had been nominated to Parliament "as a reward for her work in the CR17 campaign". Eyewitness News additionally quoted Ntshavheni expressing frustration about the media attention she had received; she apparently said:

Why am I being targeted? I'm not the only one who received money from the campaign and I've declared that I worked for the campaign and the campaign must be funded. Why is the focus on Khumbudzo Ntshavheni only? Why is the focus not on all other people?

=== Acting Minister in the Presidency ===
On 27 January 2021, Ntshavheni was appointed as acting Minister in the Presidency after the death of Minister Jackson Mthembu. She acted in the position, in parallel to her small business responsibilities, until Mondli Gungubele was appointed permanently in August. In the aftermath of the July 2021 civil unrest in South Africa, government communications were centralised under Ntshavheni, with all ministers required to consult her office on related media statements.

== Minister of Communications and Digital Technologies: 2021–2023 ==
On 5 August 2021, President Ramaphosa announced a cabinet reshuffle, appointing Ntshavheni as Minister of Communications and Digital Technologies. She traded portfolios with Stella Ndabeni-Abrahams, who became Minister of Small Business Development, and Philly Mapulane was appointed as her deputy. As minister, Ntshavheni oversaw preparations for South Africa's long-delayed digital migration.

=== Zondo Commission findings ===
In early 2022, Ntshavheni was named in the second volume of the report of the Zondo Commission, which investigated alleged state capture in South Africa over the preceding decade. Ntshavheni was mentioned in connection with her term on the Denel board, and particularly her participation in the board's decision to suspend and fire three Denel executives in 2015. The commission concluded that the executives' dismissal was intended to "remove an obstruction" to the Gupta family in their conspiracy to capture Denel, and it also concluded that Denel board members had probably misconducted themselves. Commission chairperson Raymond Zondo recommended that the board members, including Ntshavheni, should be investigated further by law enforcement, "with a view to possible prosecutions".

Ntshavheni disagreed with the report's findings and said that she had done nothing wrong. In a statement, she said:

I wish to put it on public record, as I have recorded it with the commission, that I have never met any of the Gupta brothers or any of their associates. I was never lobbied for the decisions I supported or opposed as a non-executive member of the Denel board of directors. I discharged my fiduciary responsibilities with vigour, integrity and in line with the required legislative and regulatory prescripts. I have never been party to any alleged acts of fraud, corruption, maladministration and state capture.

The following week, while briefing the National Council of Provinces, Ntshavheni said that she felt compelled to address the report, saying, "I need to indicate I will co-operate with any investigation that is being undertaken by the president. I also need to indicate that there has been no specific finding against me".

=== Election to the National Executive Committee ===
In June 2022, Ntshavheni was elected to return to the Limpopo ANC's Provincial Executive Committee. In December that year, she attended the party's 55th National Conference, where she was elected to the ANC National Executive Committee. She received 1,204 votes across roughly 4,000 ballots, making her the 50th-most popular of the 80 candidates elected to the committee. She was also narrowly elected to the National Working Committee. She supported Ramaphosa's re-election bid at the same elective conference, and she continued to be viewed as a member of Ramaphosa's "inner circle".

== Minister in the Presidency: 2023–present ==
Ntshavheni returned to the presidency in another reshuffle, announced by Ramaphosa on 6 March 2023; she was appointed to succeed Gungubele as Minister in the Presidency, with Nomasonto Motaung and Kenneth Morolong as her deputies. Her responsibilities include political oversight of the State Security Agency.

== Personal life ==
Ntshavheni has children.

Political offices
Preceded by Mondli Gungubele	Minister in the Presidency; 2023–present	Incumbent
Preceded by Stella Ndabeni-Abrahams	Minister of Communications and Digital Technologies; 2021–2023	Succeeded by Mondli Gungubele
Preceded by Lindiwe Zulu	Minister of Small Business Development; 2019–2021	Succeeded by Stella Ndabeni-Abrahams
