= Minister of Small Business Development =

South African ministerial position

South Africa Minister of Small Business Development
- Flag of South Africa

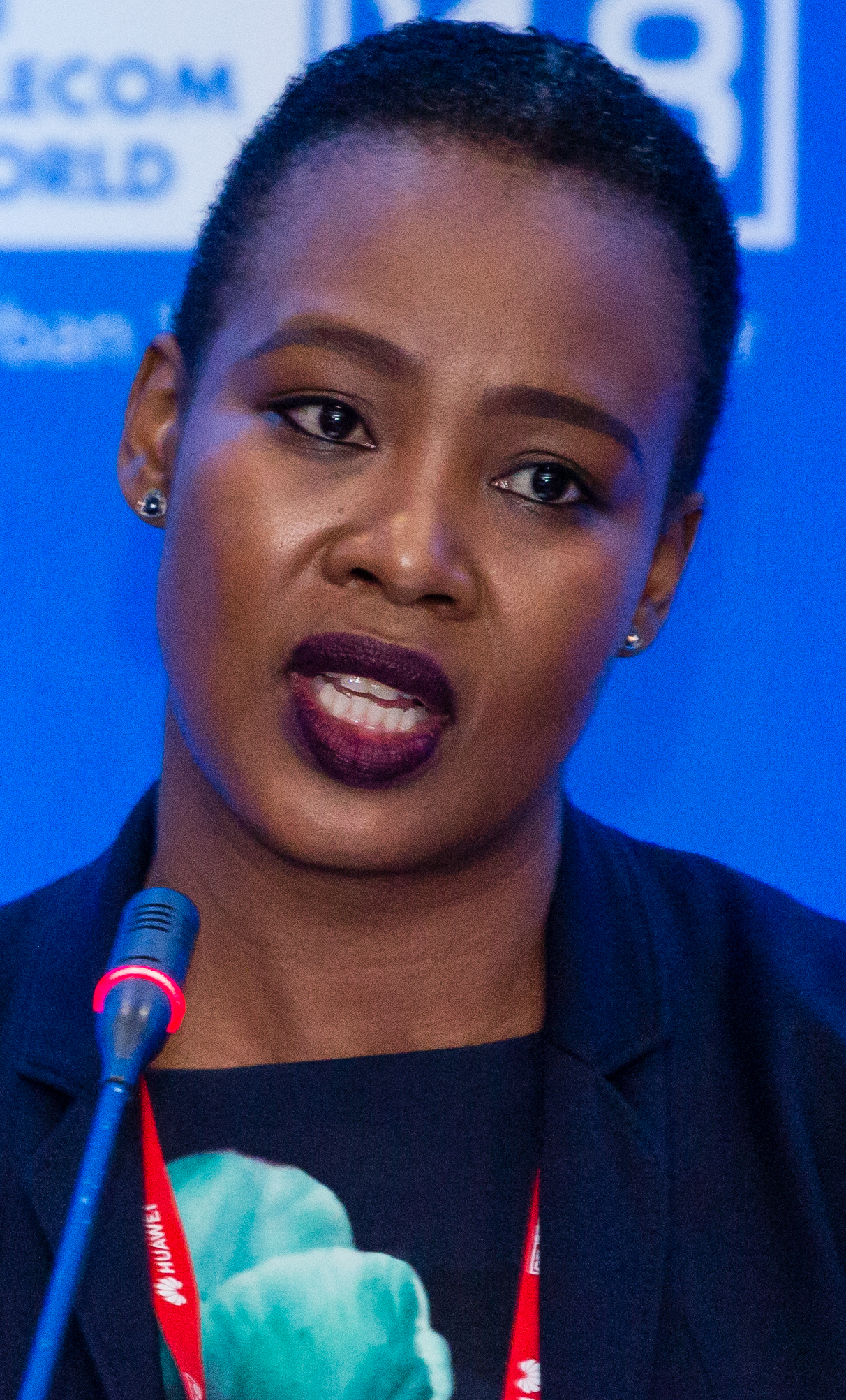
- Incumbent; Stella Ndabeni-Abrahams since 5 August 2021
- Department of Small Business Development
- Style: The Honourable
- Appointer: Cyril Ramaphosa
- Inaugural holder: Lindiwe Zulu
- Formation: 25 May 2014
- Deputy: Jane Sithole
- Website: Small Business Development

The minister of small business development is a minister in the Cabinet of South Africa.

== Formation ==
President Jacob Zuma announced the formation of the new Small Business Development Ministry on 25 May 2014. Its purpose was to promote and develop small businesses and co-operatives by focusing on both economic incentives and legislation so as to stimulate entrepreneurship in South Africa and transform the lives of economically disadvantaged people.

== History ==
In August 2012, the National Development Plan 2030 was created by the South African government and it identified small business as the key area for job creation, expecting 90% of jobs in a future economy being generated by the sector. Prior to the ministry's creation in 2014, small business policy and its implementation was under the control of the Trade and Industry department and its minister, with poor results.

On 25 May 2014, President Jacob Zuma appointed his cabinet with the new ministry of Small Business Development created, and its minister was named as Lindiwe Zulu.

Speaking at a meeting in Durban in November 2018, Minister Lindiwe Zulu expressed a view that the Ministry of Small Development must continue after the election in May 2019. President Cyril Ramaphosa expressed his view at the State of the Nation (SONA) address in February 2018 that cabinet ministries should be reduced to save money. Rumour had circulated that this ministry could be re-merged with Trade and Industry.

On 29 May 2019, following the elections earlier in the month, President Ramaphosa announced the new ministries and ministers with the Ministry of Small Business Development remaining intact, but under a new minister, Khumbudzo Ntshavheni.

== List of past ministers ==
Name	Term		Party	President
Lindiwe Zulu	25 May 2014	26 February 2018	ANC	Jacob Zuma (II)
Lindiwe Zulu	26 February 2018	29 May 2019	ANC	Cyril Ramaphosa (I)
Khumbudzo Ntshavheni	30 May 2019	5 August 2021	ANC	Cyril Ramaphosa (II)
Stella Ndabeni-Abrahams	5 August 2021	Incumbent	ANC	Cyril Ramaphosa (II)

== Social entrepreneurship ==
In Africa, social entrepreneurship is the role of social enterprise in filling institutional voids, lifting communities from poverty, meeting social needs arising from disease and post conflict situations and linking commercial and non-profit mechanisms in hybrid organizations. An evolution of the conventional philanthropy to venture philanthropy has been the basis of social entrepreneurship in South Africa. Years of marginalization through non-profits and other donors has left South Africa in cultural distress which makes social entrepreneurship the most suitable type of assistance for South Africa.The adjustment to social entrepreneurship has made many philanthropists and donors rewrite the way they invest their support. Worldwide, policymakers are using the language of local capacity building as a strategy to assist impoverished communities in becoming self‐reliant. As a result of this development, there has been an influx of institutions solely dedicated to increasing social entrepreneurship. Researchers suggest that the time is certainly ripe for entrepreneurial approaches to social problems.

=== Demographics ===
==== South African entrepreneurs ====
Name	Business	Function
Lebo Gunguluza	GEM Group	Media/Technology
George Sombonos	Chicken Licken	Food
Albe Geldenhuys	Ultimate Sports Nutrition (USN)	Supplements
Anat Apter	ANAT Middle Eastern Eatery	Food

==== Women ====
Research concludes that Women in South Africa are the most beneficial channel through which social entrepreneurship develops. Women are the fundamental part of any successful poverty reduction approach, due to their disproportionate level of poverty and the consequential effects of such on children and communities within their care. Research concludes that adding a gender lens to the creation of social enterprises is vital to the success of social entrepreneurship. Societies that promote gender equality have a higher occurrence of social entrepreneurship than those who do not. Business ownership may allow women to influence change and to make a difference in the lives of other women and the community in general.

==== Youth ====
Entrepreneurship education's positive effect has been studied regarding four areas of South African youth. It can help with self-confidence, understanding of financial and business issues, increased passion to succeed, and a greater desire to move on to higher education. Apartheid education is still prevalent in many South African areas which limits chances for success in social entrepreneurship. Statistics South Africa (2012) indicates that 71% of the unemployed are aged 25–34 and the unemployment rate among youth is 36%. About 3.3 million youth aged 15–34 are not employed or studying. However, there are programs in place to circumvent the gap between knowledge of business and the action of creating entrepreneurship. Youth Empowerment Service (YES) is the first social initiative between government and business which seeks out groundbreaking ways, through innovation and technology to create one million jobs for South Africa's youth. Junior Achievement (JA) Youth Enterprise Development Program, a richly layered educational experience that takes passionate achievers from the ages of 18 to 35 and teaches them how to establish a sustainable business. The SAB Foundation Tholoana Enterprise Development Program invests in entrepreneurs with a particular emphasis on women, youth, people in rural areas and entrepreneurs with a disability. All of these foundations are critical to the success of businesses in South Africa.

=== Obstacles ===
==== Policy ====
The challenges facing South Africa are immense: it is a relatively young democratic, highly inegalitarian country, with enormous socio-economic problems. Jobs are not being created in the South African labour market at a fast enough rate and there is an expectation from school-leavers that they must find work in the corporate world with scant attention given to creating their own businesses. An uncertainty of laws and policies correlate to the difficulty of starting a South African-based company. Laws and policies are intended to inspire public trust and respect, and their enforcement requires an effective supporting institution such as the judiciary. Therefore, any inconsistencies by the judiciary in enforcing laws create public mistrust and diminishes its respectability however well-intended it is. Bureaucratic intervention and corruption lead to government agencies forming certain manipulations of the systems for their profit. Quite often, small businesses are the worst victims as they tend to have less knowledge of and involvement in the drafting of new regulations. The creative brilliance of the lead entrepreneur and the quality, maturity, and depth of the entrepreneurial team significantly influence the success of a venture. However, high levels of uncertainty of laws and policies and other forms of institutional obstacles requiring fluid adaptive responses discourage initiative, weakens perseverance and resilience and confuses risk-reduction strategy. The South African entrepreneurial environment is marked by a combination of negative factors a mix of institutional, political and economic problems at the domestic level, superimposed by regional political instability such as the war in the Congo and adverse international economic forces like the instability of emerging markets. Any category of these forces could alone spur negative sentiments in domestic and foreign investors based on their believed risk levels. But it is the convergence of all these forces that has provided a thick veil of unfavourable perception about South Africa.

=== Capacity building ===
==== Business incubators ====
South Africa is investing in business incubators to encourage entrepreneurs and citizens alike to increase their entrepreneurial ventures. Lack of skills and expertise, funding challenges, technology and access to business networks are the reasons why entrepreneurs join business incubators. In order to be successful in their entrepreneurial ventures, entrepreneurs should have skills and expertise in the industry in which they operate, and should be able to identify gaps and opportunities in the market and take advantage of them. Financial institutions are quite nervous to lend money to new businesses owing to the risk of failure associated with them; entrepreneurs should find a founding partner who will act as a mentor, as well as give access to funding. Financial institutions are quite nervous to lend money to new businesses owing to the risk of failure associated with them; entrepreneurs should find a founding partner who will act as a mentor, as well as give access to funding. Most entrepreneurs lack the necessary resources that are required to successfully run their business. This can be achieved through business incubator support, as it is easy for them to obtain funding from investors, banking institutions and the government.
