= ITU Telecom World 2006 =

The Logo of ITU Telecom World 2006

ITU Telecom World 2006 (Chinese: 2006年世界電信展) was a large-scale convention and exhibition hosted by Hong Kong, on 4–8 December 2006 at the AsiaWorld–Expo in Hong Kong. The 2006 ITU Telecom World convention was the first time the exhibition is held outside Geneva.

ITU Telecom World is the most important event of the International Telecommunication Union (ITU) for worldwide telecom industry and it is held every 3 to 4 years. Since its first hosting in 1971 in Geneva, Switzerland, it had never been held elsewhere.

According to the Hong Kong Government, this event attracted more than 61,958 individuals from overseas and brought in revenues of approximately HK$900 million.

== Programming ==
The event was divided into two parts: an Exhibition and a Forum. In the exhibition, the newest telecommunication equipment, service and technologies were showcased to visitors. In the forums, participants discussed policies, regulations, technologies, business applications and business environments.

== Local media programming ==
To match up this exhibition, the convention invited Television Broadcasts Limited (TVB) to be a "Host City Special Media Partner". TVB recorded the speakers in the forum and broadcast the footage as part of the television programme "ITU Telecom World 2006". TVB Jade and TVB Pearl provided a live feed during the exhibition.

== See also ==
- International Telecommunication Union
- ITU Telecom World 2011
