= Jane Sithole =

South African politician (born 1970)

Jane Sithole MPL
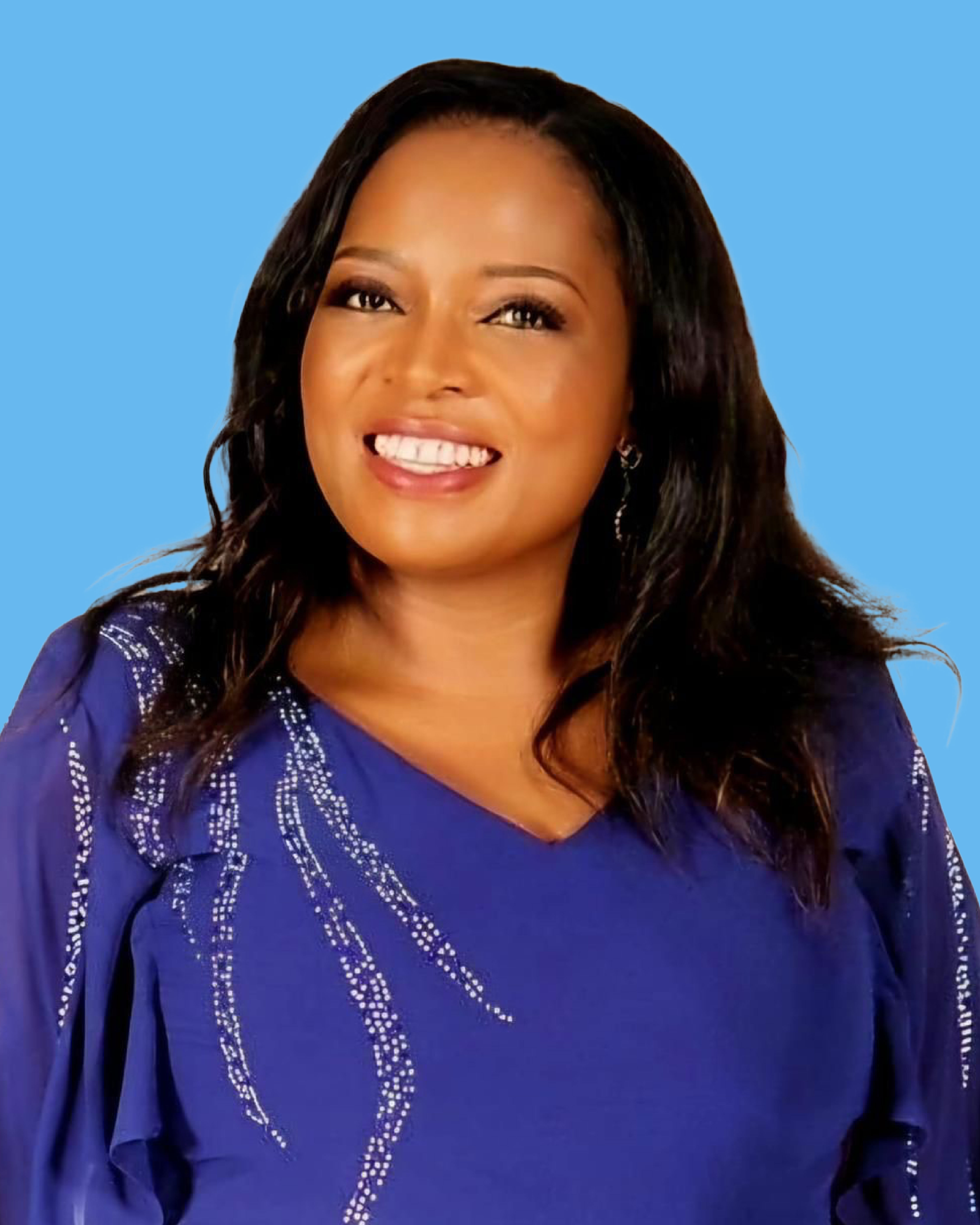
- Sithole in 2024

Deputy Minister of Small Business Development
- Incumbent
- Assumed office 3 July 2024
- Minister: Stella Ndabeni-Abrahams
- Preceded by: Dipuo Peters

Leader of the Democratic Alliance in Mpumalanga
- Incumbent
- Assumed office 3 March 2018
- Preceded by: James Masango

Member of the National Assembly of South Africa
- Incumbent
- Assumed office 14 June 2024

Member of the Mpumalanga Provincial Legislature
- In office 21 May 2014 – 28 May 2024

Personal details
- Born: Raesetja Jane Sithole; 23 August 1970 (age 55)
- Party: Democratic Alliance
- Other political affiliations: Democratic Party
- Profession: Politician

Raesetja Jane Sithole (born 23 August 1970) is a South African politician who has served as Deputy Minister of Small Business Development in the Government of National Unity (GNU) since July 2024 and as a Member of the National Assembly of South Africa since June 2024. She has served as the Provincial Leader of the Democratic Alliance in Mpumalanga since March 2018 and served as a Member of the Mpumalanga Provincial Legislature from 2014 until 2024.

== Education ==
Sithole achieved a BA Degree in Communications from the University of South Africa. Sithole also holds a National Diploma (T3) in Office Administration from the Tshwane University of Technology. She also obtained a Diploma in Political Leadership and Governance from the Wits School of Governance. She further obtained a Post Graduate Diploma in Political Leadership and Governance from the Wits School of Governance. Sithole also obtained a Management Development Programme (MDP) certificate from the Graduate School of Management at the University of Pretoria. She also obtained a Senior Management Programme (SMP) certificate from the Graduate School of Management at the University of Pretoria.

== Political career ==
Sithole joined the Democratic Alliance, previously known as the Democratic Party, in 1999. Sithole had served as a councillor of both the Emalahleni Local Municipality and the Nkangala District Municipality from 2000 until 2014. Sithole served as Chief Whip of Emalahleni Caucus from 2007 up to 2014.

She was elected to the Mpumalanga Provincial Legislature in 2014 and was appointed to the position of Chief Whip of the Democratic Alliance caucus. In the fifth provincial legislature (2014–2019), she served on the Public Works & Transport, Community Safety, Security & Liaison, Health, and Social Development committees in the legislature. She currently sits on the Health and Social Development, and Education, Culture, Sport and Recreation committees.

Before being elected Provincial Leader, Sithole served as Provincial Chairperson for the Association of Democratic Alliance Councillors (ADAC) from 2005 to 2011. Sithole was elected to the position of Provincial Deputy Leader in 2012 until 2015. In 2015 Sithole was elected to the position of Provincial Chairperson of the party. Sithole was elected unopposed as the Provincial Leader of the Democratic Alliance in Mpumalanga on 3 March 2018, succeeding James Masango.

On 20 September 2018, Sithole was announced as the Democratic Alliance's Mpumalanga Premier candidate for the 2019 election.

In the May 2019 election, the Provincial Democratic Alliance lost its official opposition status to the Economic Freedom Fighters, though the party did manage to retain all three of its seats in the provincial legislature.

Sithole was re-elected unopposed as provincial leader in October 2020. She supported interim DA leader John Steenhuisen's campaign to become leader of the party for a full term at the party's Federal Congress.

Sithole was re-elected to another term as the party's provincial leader at the provincial congress in February 2023, and served as the Leader of the Democratic Alliance Caucus in the Mpumalanga Provincial Legislature from 2018 to 2024.

Sithole was elected as a member of the National Assembly of South Africa for the DA in the 2024 general election. As the ANC lost its parliamentary majority and entered into a coalition with the DA, Sithole was named as Deputy Minister of Small Business Development.

On 14 February 2026, Sithole was re-elected for a fourth term as the provincial leader of the DA in Mpumalanga unopposed.

Party political offices
Preceded by James Masango	Provincial Leader of the Mpumalanga Democratic Alliance; 2018–present	Incumbent
