= AsiaWorld–Expo =

Convention and exhibition facility in Hong Kong

Coordinates: 22°19′17″N 113°56′38″E

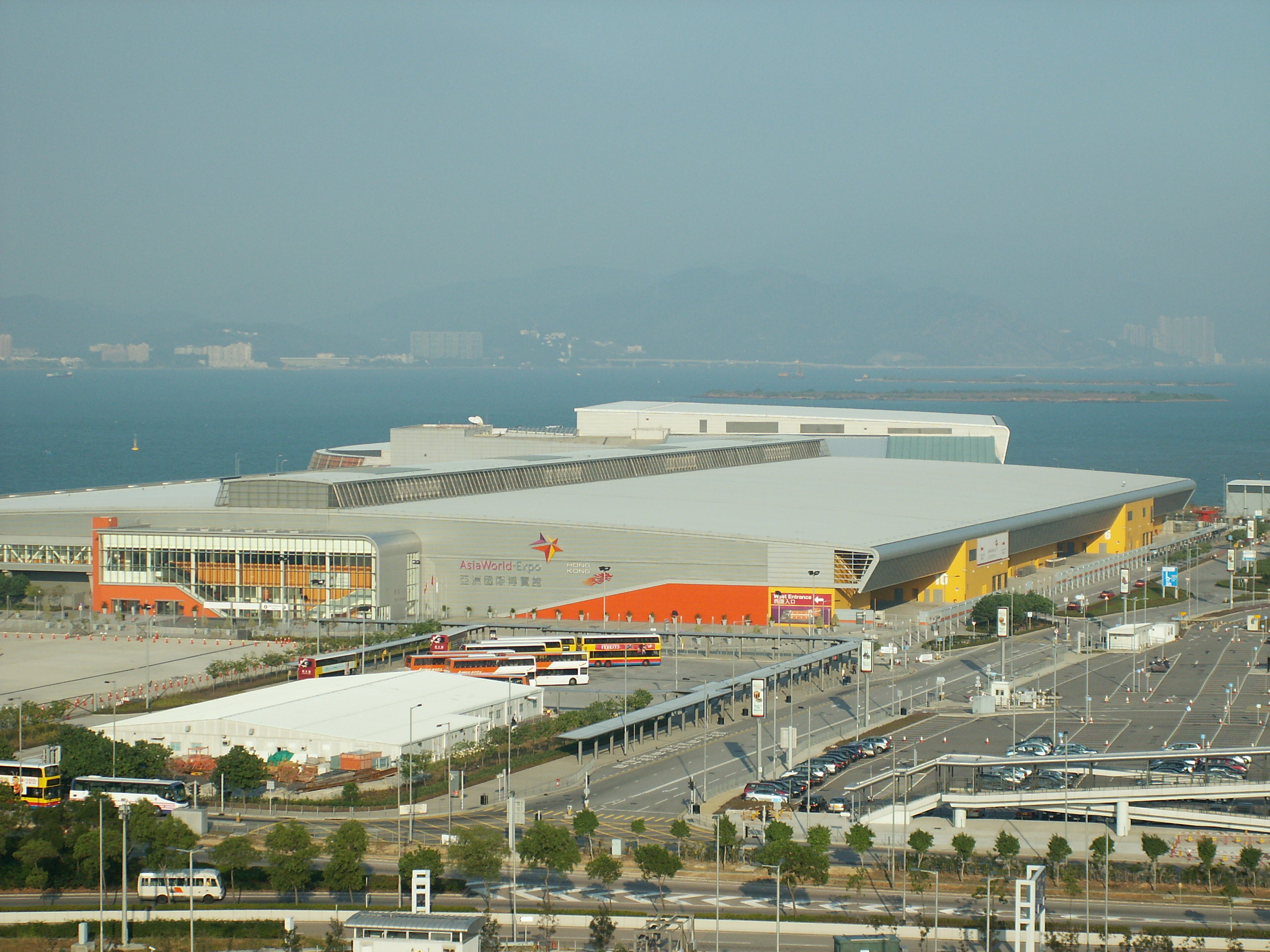
- AsiaWorld-Expo, seen from the Hong Kong International Airport, 2007
- Interactive map of AsiaWorld–Expo
- Address: 1 Airport Expo Boulevard; Chek Lap Kok, Lantau Island, Hong Kong
- Location: Hong Kong International Airport
- Owner: Airport Authority Hong Kong
- Operator: AsiaWorld–Expo Management, Ltd.
- Public transit: AsiaWorld–Expo station

Construction
- Built: 29 March 2004; 22 years ago
- Opened: 21 December 2005; 20 years ago
- Cost: HK$2.35 billion

Website
- Venue Website

AsiaWorld–Expo
- Traditional Chinese: 亞洲國際博覽館
- Simplified Chinese: 亚洲国际博览馆
Transcriptions
Standard Mandarin
- Hanyu Pinyin: yàzhōu guójì bólǎnguǎn
Yue: Cantonese
- Yale Romanization: A jāu gwok jai bok láahm gún
- Jyutping: Aa3 zau1 gwok3 zai3 bok3 laam5 gun2

The AsiaWorld–Expo is one of the two major convention and exhibition facilities in Hong Kong along with Hong Kong Convention and Exhibition Centre. It was opened on 21 December 2005 by Donald Tsang, the second chief executive of Hong Kong, and it is operated by AsiaWorld–Expo Management Limited. It is located on Chek Lap Kok island, next to the Hong Kong International Airport.

== History ==
The complex was built under a public–private partnership involving the Hong Kong government, landowner Airport Authority Hong Kong, and a consortium led by private company Dragages et Travaux Publics. The name of the new centre, AsiaWorld–Expo, was announced on 27 November 2003, and is intended to reflect Hong Kong's "Asia's World City" promotional brand, which was launched in 2001.

A groundbreaking ceremony was held on 29 March 2004. The new facility opened on 21 December 2005.

During the COVID-19 pandemic, AsiaWorld–Expo was used as a Department of Health saliva collection and testing centre for those arriving at the Hong Kong International Airport. It had later been used as a treatment facility for patients with mild cases of COVID-19 starting from January 2022.

In May 2022, Irene Chan Fong-ying, the chief executive of AsiaWorld-Expo, said the first phase of the facility will have upgraded facilities and smart sanitizing equipment such as UV lights costing HK$600 million while a new 30,000 square meter second phase will have 20,000 seats.

== Features ==
At a construction cost of HK$2.35 billion, AsiaWorld–Expo has over 70,000 square metres of space with 10 ground-level and column-free halls, including the AsiaWorld–Arena – the biggest purpose-built indoor seated entertainment arena in Hong Kong with a maximum capacity of 14,000; the AsiaWorld–Summit – Hong Kong's largest indoor conference venue that seats 700 to 5,000 persons; the Runway 11 – the venue's latest conference and function hall for 500 to 3,800 guests.

AsiaWorld–Expo is also an award-winning venue. In 2017, the arena is awarded the "Best International Venue" at the Exhibition News Awards.

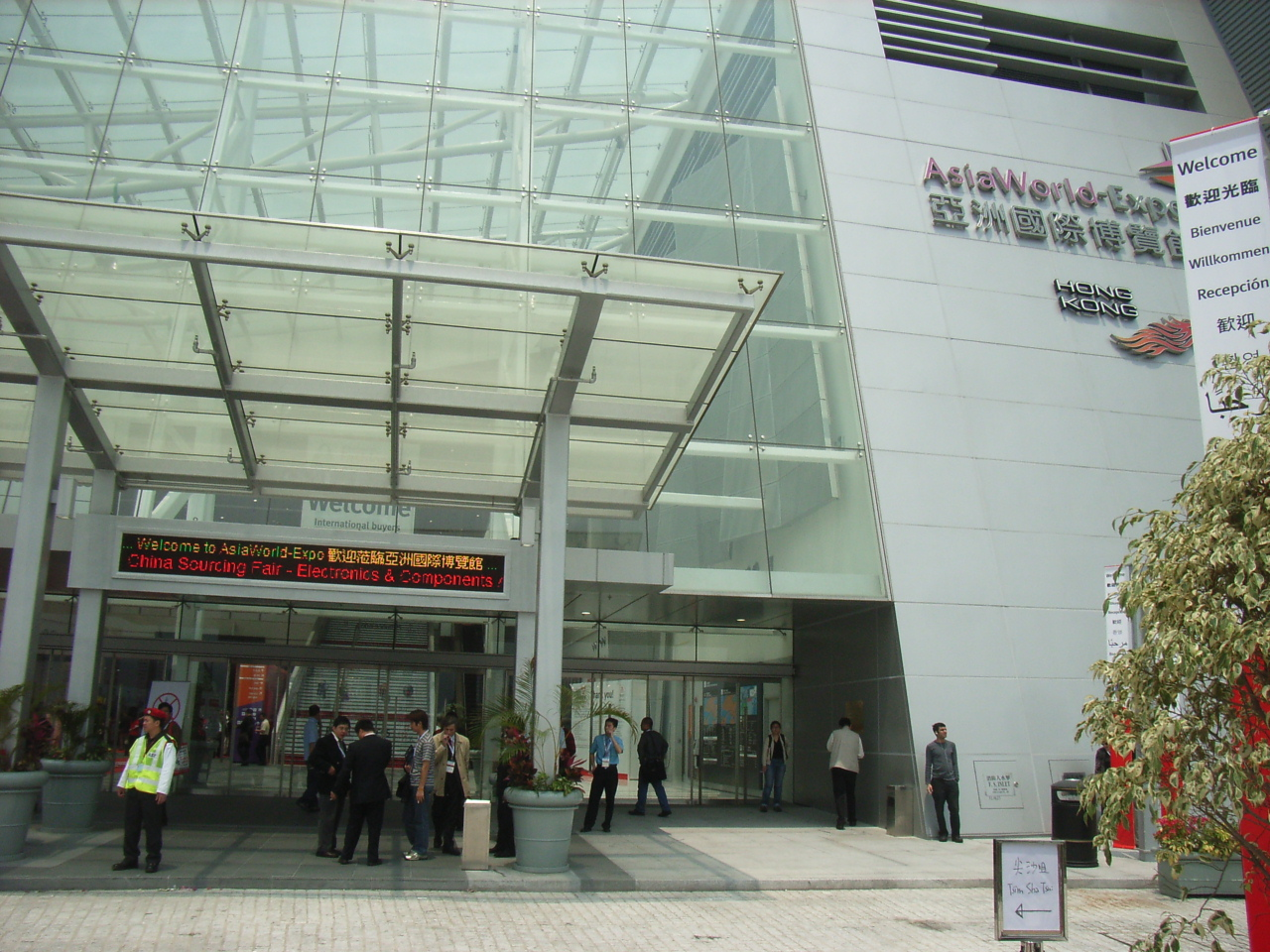
Entrance of AsiaWorld–Expo

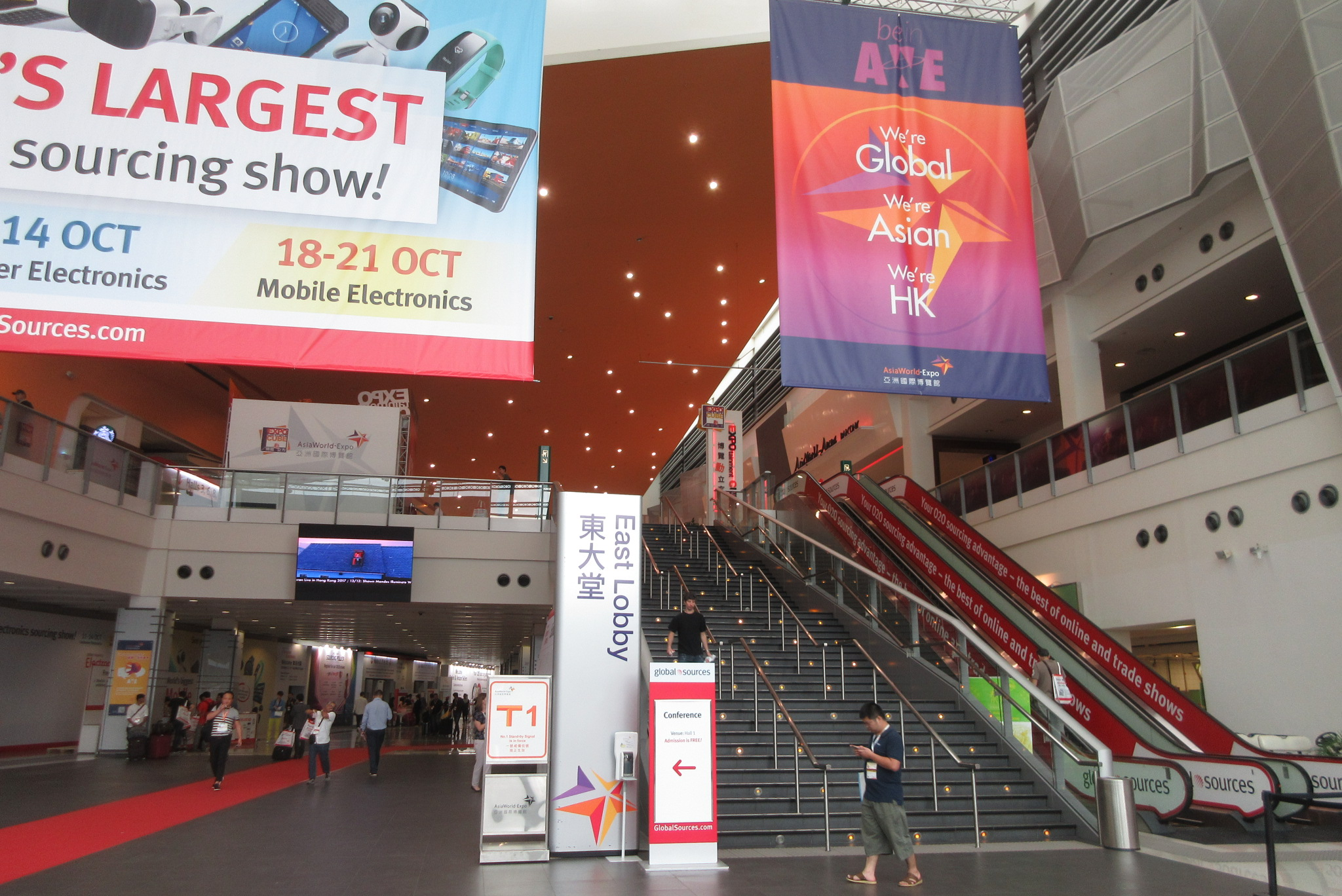
Lobby of the arena

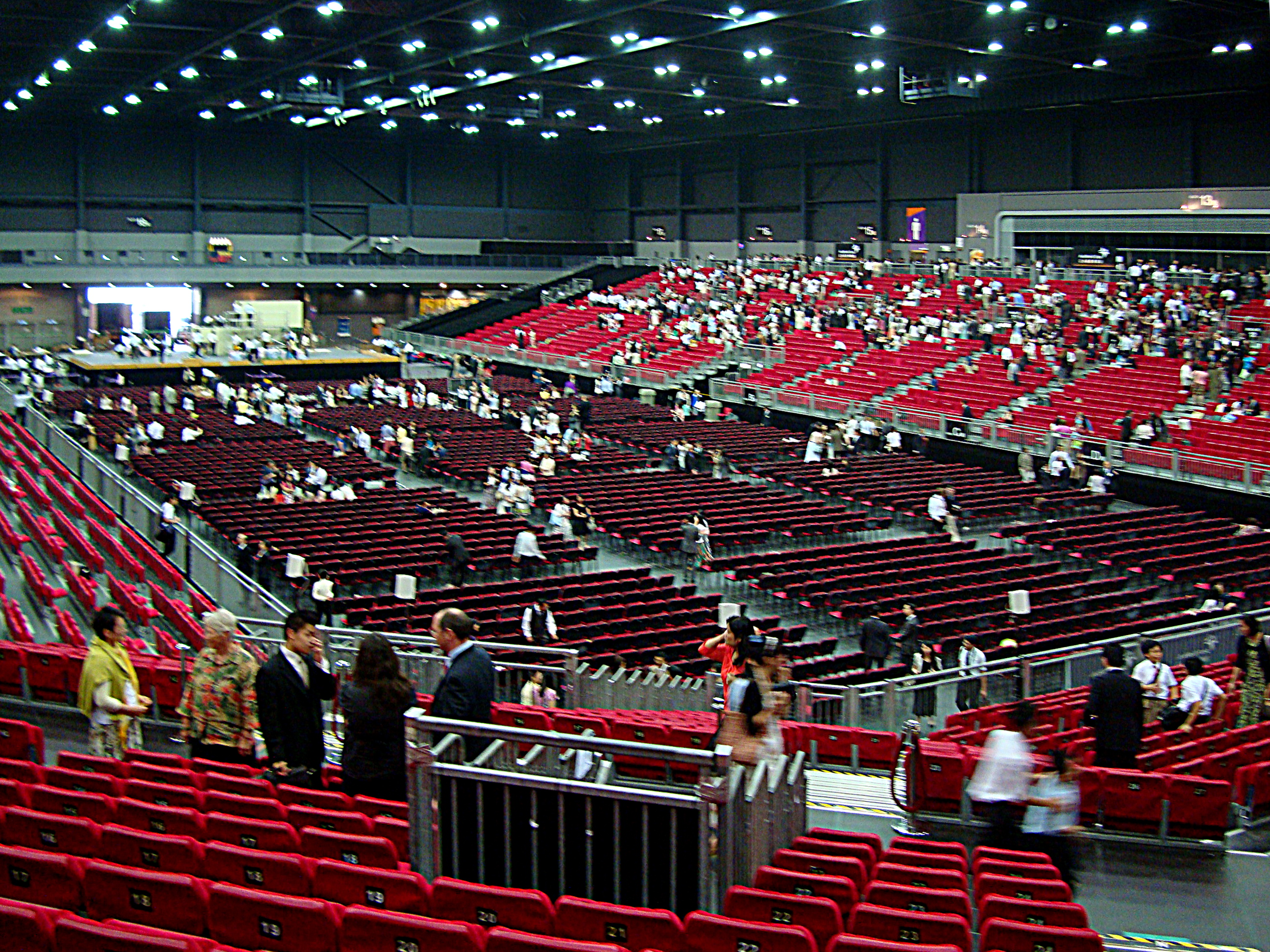
Indoor acts and exhibitions arena

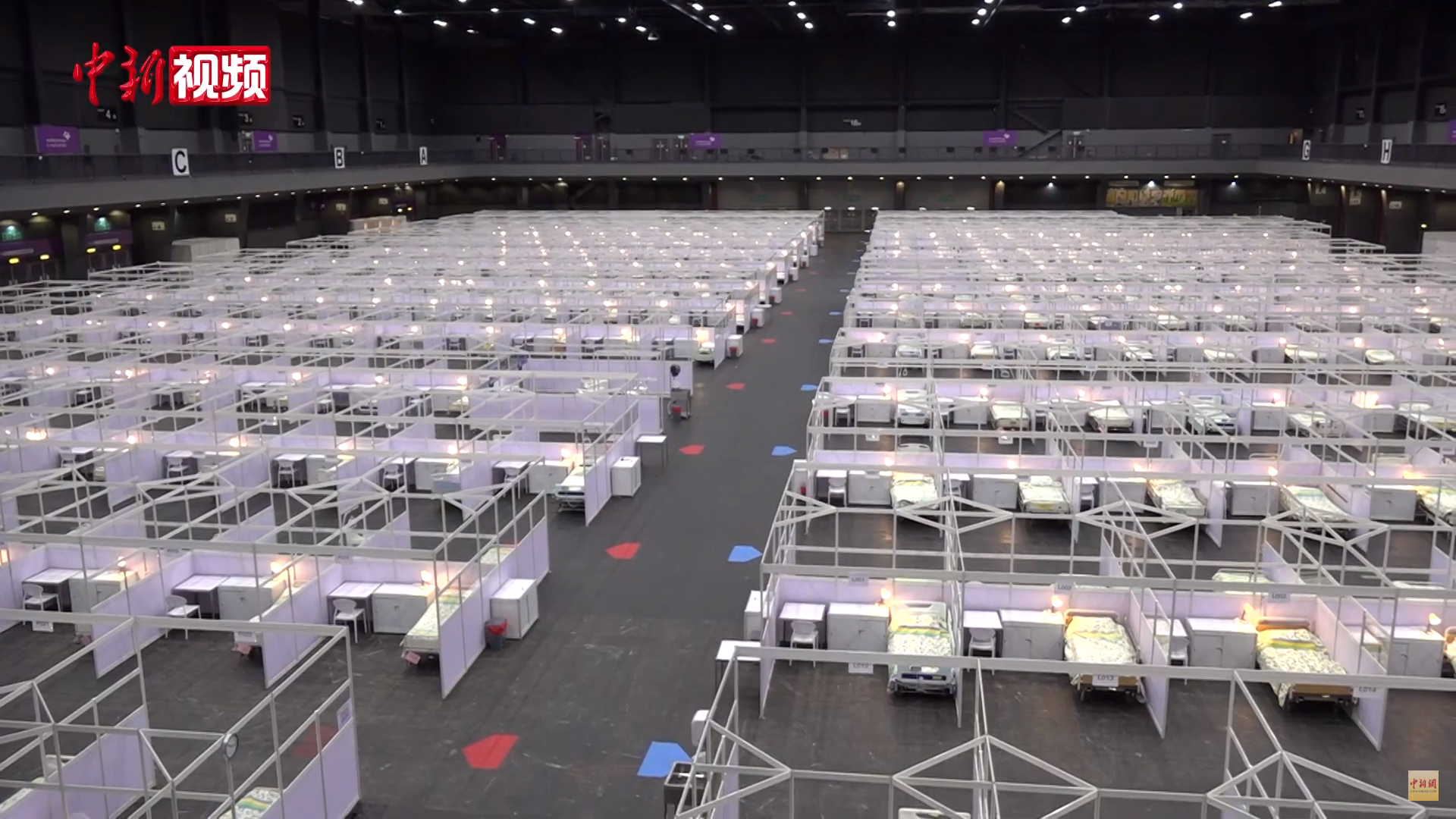
Makeshift hospital operating since 1 August 2020.

== Venues ==
- The Arena (Hall 1)
- AsiaWorld-Summit (Hall 2)
- Typical Halls (Halls 3–11)
- VIVA (Halls 8 & 10)
- Runway 11 (Hall 11)
- Meeting & Hospitality Centre

== Transport ==
AsiaWorld–Expo is next to the airport; visitors can walk to the venue in a short distance. The venue is next to the AsiaWorld–Expo station, on the Airport Express of the Hong Kong MTR. Buses and coach from Mainland China are also available.

Most road signs directing to AsiaWorld–Expo simply refer to the venue as "Expo".

== Exhibitions and events ==
The halls of AsiaWorld–Expo, mainly AsiaWorld–Arena, AsiaWorld-Summit, and VIVA, have been used for various entertainment events. They have staged concerts by acts such as Oasis, Michael Bublé, Eric Clapton, Il Divo, Coldplay, David Guetta, Madonna, Britney Spears, Kylie Minogue, Alicia Keys, Björk, Avril Lavigne, Bruno Mars, One Direction, Lady Gaga, Taylor Swift, Justin Bieber, Jennifer Lopez, Maroon 5, Lily Allen, Ariana Grande, Westlife, Christina Aguilera, Plácido Domingo, Ayumi Hamasaki, Deep Purple, Green Day, Wonder Girls, Girls' Generation, L'Arc-en-Ciel, Namie Amuro, Stone Roses, Super Junior, Macklemore & Ryan Lewis, Imagine Dragons, X Japan, Smashing Pumpkins, Big Bang, 2NE1, G-Dragon, JYJ, Exo, BTS, GOT7, Monsta X, 5 Seconds of Summer, Katy Perry, Metallica, Jessie J, Shane Filan of Westlife, Guns N' Roses, Above & Beyond, Blackpink, Treasure, IU, NMIXX, Le Sserafim and many more.

Since 2013, it has hosted the Mnet Asian Music Awards. It has also hosted exhibition such as ITU Telecom World 2006, Asian Aerospace, and E-Commerce Asia.
