= Siyabonga Cwele =

South African doctor and politician (born 1958)

His Excellency Siyabonga Cwele
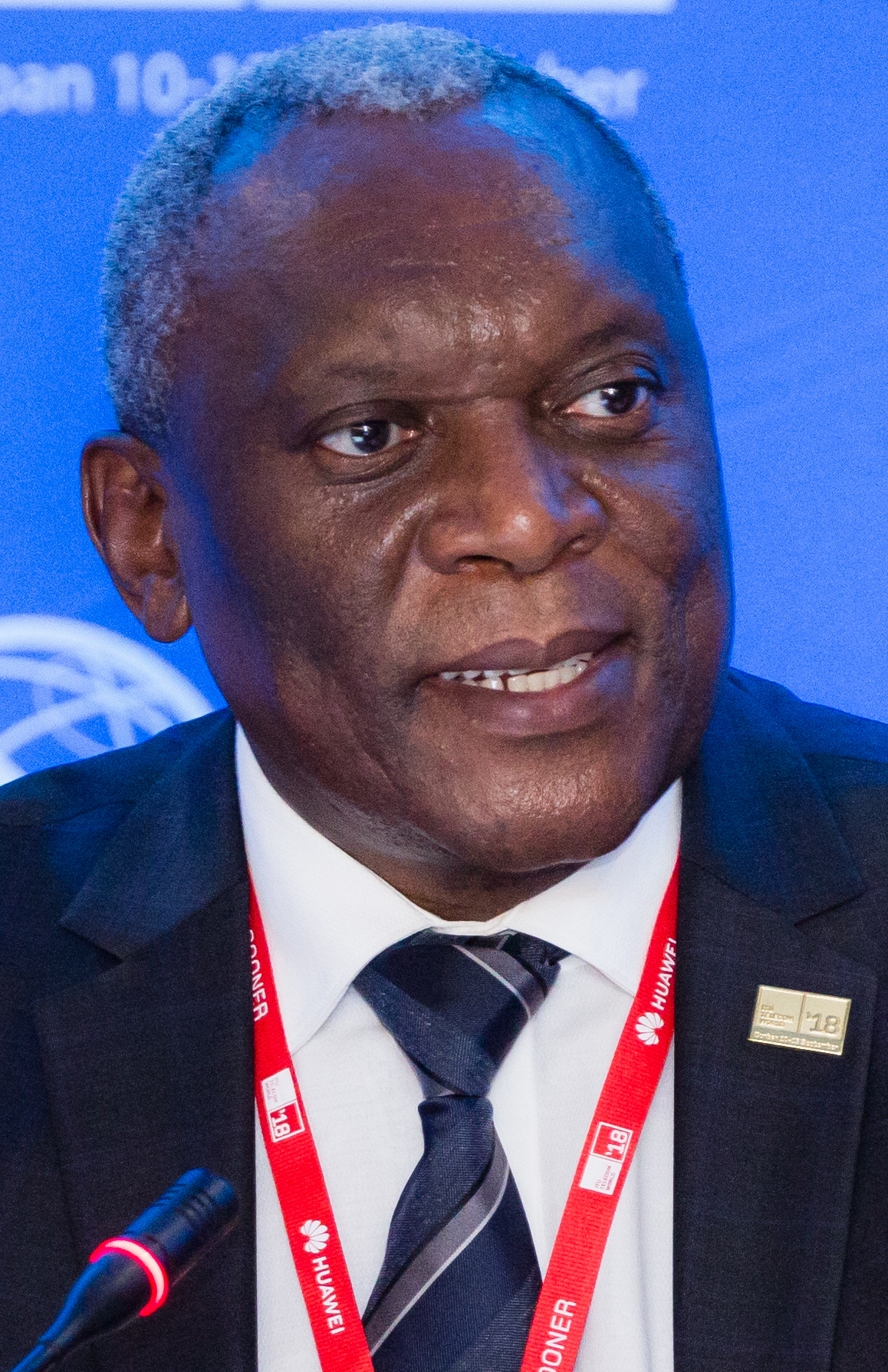
- Cwele in September 2018

South African Ambassador to China
- Incumbent
- Assumed office 23 December 2020
- President: Cyril Ramaphosa
- Preceded by: Dolana Msimang

Minister of Home Affairs
- In office 22 November 2018 – 29 May 2019
- President: Cyril Ramaphosa
- Deputy: Fatima Chohan
- Preceded by: Malusi Gigaba
- Succeeded by: Aaron Motsoaledi
Prior cabinet offices 2008–2018
Minister of Telecommunications and Postal Services
In office 25 May 2014 – 22 November 2018
President	Jacob Zuma; Cyril Ramaphosa
Deputy	Hlengiwe Mkhize; Stella Ndabeni-Abrahams
Preceded by	Position established
Succeeded by	Position abolished
Minister of State Security
In office 11 May 2009 – 25 May 2014
President	Jacob Zuma
Preceded by	Himself (for Intelligence)
Succeeded by	David Mahlobo
Minister of Intelligence Services
In office 25 September 2008 – 10 May 2009
President	Kgalema Motlanthe
Preceded by	Ronnie Kasrils
Succeeded by	Himself (for State Security)
Legislative offices 1994–2019
Member of the National Assembly
In office 14 June 1999 – 3 June 2019
Constituency	KwaZulu-Natal (1999–2009)
Permanent Delegate to the National Council of Provinces
Assembly Member for KwaZulu-Natal
In office 9 May 1994 – June 1999

Personal details
- Born: Siyabonga Cyprian Cwele; 3 September 1958 (age 68)
- Citizenship: South Africa
- Party: African National Congress
- Spouse: Sheryl Cwele (m. 1985; div. 2011)
- Education: University of KwaZulu-Natal (MBChB); Stellenbosch University (MPhil)

Siyabonga Cyprian Cwele (born 3 September 1958) is a South African politician who served in the cabinet of South Africa from September 2008 to May 2019, most recently as the Minister of Home Affairs between 2018 and 2019. He was appointed as the South African Ambassador to China in December 2020. He is a member of the African National Congress (ANC) and represented the party in Parliament from 1994 to 2019.

A medical doctor by training, Cwele joined the ANC underground during apartheid in 1984. In the 1994 general election, he was elected to the KwaZulu-Natal delegation of the National Council of Provinces, where he served for a single term before joining the National Assembly. He chaired Parliament's Joint Standing Committee on Intelligence between 2004 and 2008.

In September 2008, he was appointed to the cabinet of President Kgalema Motlanthe, who named him as Minister of Intelligence. He remained in that office until May 2014, though President Jacob Zuma renamed it as the Minister of State Security in May 2009. From May 2014 to November 2018, he was the Minister of Telecommunications and Postal Services under Zuma and his successor, Cyril Ramaphosa, and he went on to serve a brief stint as Ramaphosa's Minister of Home Affairs from November 2018 to May 2019. After the 2019 general election, he was excluded from Ramaphosa's second cabinet and resigned from his legislative seat.

Cwele was a member of the ANC National Executive Committee from December 2012 to December 2022. Before that, he served in the Provincial Executive Committee in KwaZulu-Natal between 1990 and 2012.

== Early life and education ==
Cwele was born on 3 September 1958 at KwaMachi near Harding in what became KwaZulu Natal province. He graduated from the University of KwaZulu-Natal with an MBChB in 1984 and he later completed an MPhil in economic policy from the University of Stellenbosch.

== Early political career ==
Between 1984 and 1990, he served in underground structures of the African National Congress (ANC), which at the time was banned by the apartheid government. After the party was unbanned in 1990, he was elected to the inaugural Provincial Executive Committee of the ANC's new KwaZulu-Natal branch; he remained a member of the committee for over two decades thereafter.

== Parliament: 1994–2008 ==
In the April 1994 general election, South Africa's first under universal suffrage, Cwele was elected to represent the ANC in the Senate of South Africa, soon renamed the National Council of Provinces. He represented the KwaZulu-Natal constituency. He served only a single term in his seat: in the next general election in June 1999, he was elected instead to the National Assembly, the upper house of Parliament. He was a backbencher, again representing the KwaZulu-Natal constituency, until after the 2004 general election, when the ANC nominated him to chair the Joint Standing Committee on Intelligence.

== Intelligence and State Security: 2008–2014 ==
On 25 September 2008, recently elected President Kgalema Motlanthe announced that Cwele would be appointed to his cabinet as Minister of Intelligence, a position vacated by the resignation of Ronnie Kasrils. In the April 2009 general election, Motlanthe was succeeded by President Jacob Zuma, who renamed Cwele's position as the Minister of State Security, to align with the newly restructured State Security Agency (SSA).

During his tenure in the ministry, Cwele attended the ANC's 53rd National Conference in December 2012. Though Cwele had been re-elected to the Provincial Executive Committee in May, he graduated at the 53rd Conference to the National Executive Committee, gaining election to a five-year term. By number of votes received, he was the 24th-most popular member of the 80-member body.

=== Zondo Commission findings ===
Cwele's activities in the state security portfolio were later investigated by the Zondo Commission, which was established to investigate state capture under Zuma's administration. At the commission, three top SSA officials – Mo Shaik, Mzuvukile Maqetuka, and Gibson Njenje – testified that Cwele had obstructed investigations into the influence of the Gupta family and into Arthur Fraser's use of a slush fund to operate the controversial Principal Agent Network. Cwele's relationship with all three officials had been poor, and he denied their allegations in his own testimony before the commission. However, the final report of the Zondo Commission largely accepted the officials' account, concluding that Cwele had obstructed both investigations in order to protect President Zuma's interests.

== Telecommunications and Postal Services: 2014–2018 ==
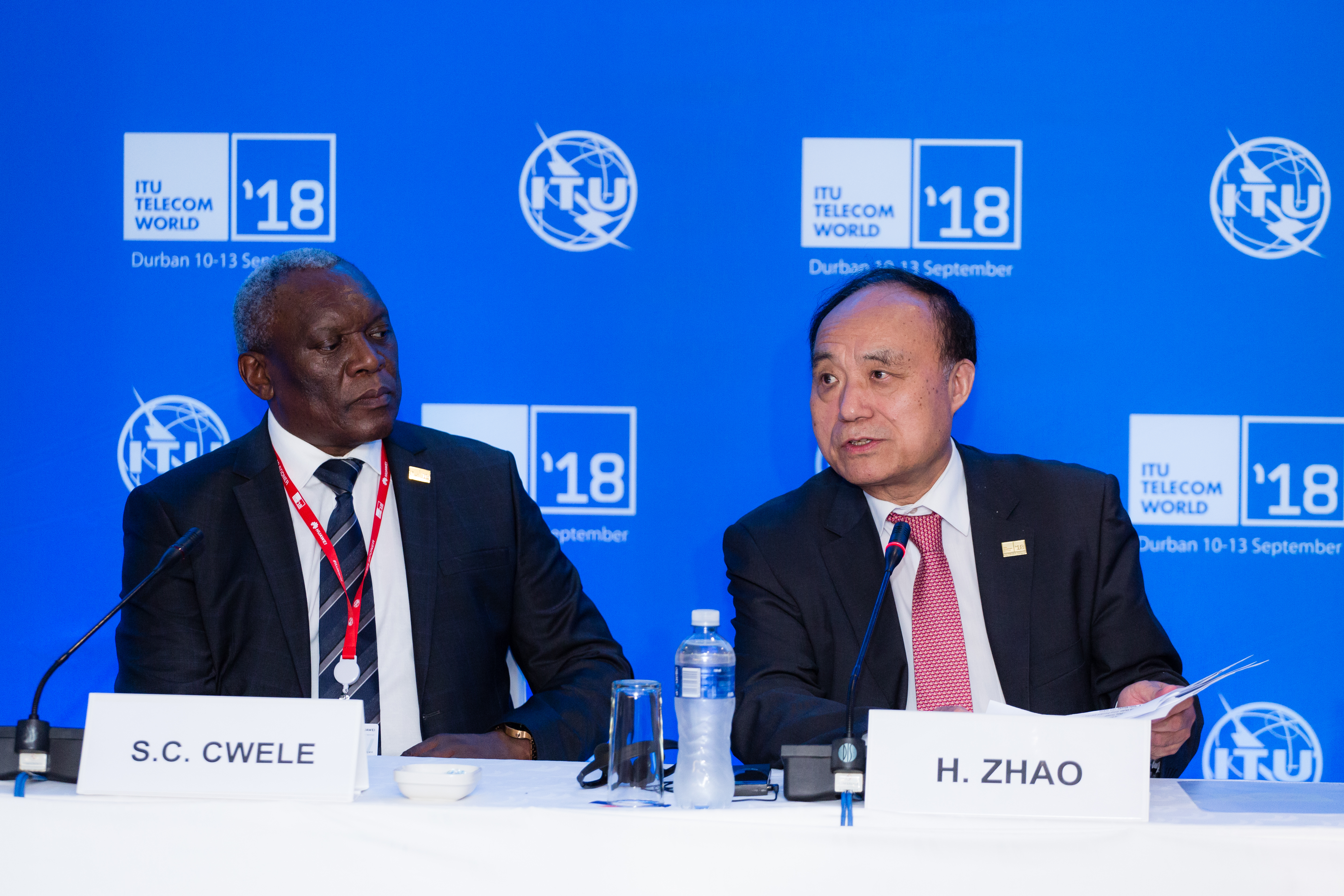
Cwele with Houlin Zhao at ITU Telecom World, 10 September 2018

In the 2014 general election, Cwele was re-elected to his fourth term in the National Assembly, ranked 31st on the ANC's national party list. Announcing his second-term cabinet, Zuma also announced a reconfiguration in the communications portfolio: Cwele was appointed to a new ministry as Minister of Telecommunications and Postal Services.

During this period, the ANC was increasingly divided over Zuma's leadership and the race to succeed him as ANC president. According to the Business Day, Cwele shifted his allegiance to Zuma's deputy, Cyril Ramaphosa, in 2017, though he had previously been viewed as a strong supporter of Zuma. The Mail & Guardian reported in May 2017 that Cwele had supported a motion of no confidence in Zuma's leadership, tabled by Joel Netshitenzhe at an ANC meeting – although Eyewitness News reported that he had opposed the same motion. At the ANC's 54th National Conference in December that year, Ramaphosa was elected to succeed Zuma as the president of the party, and Cwele was re-elected to the National Executive Committee, ranked 60th of 80. He was retained in the cabinet when Ramaphosa replaced Zuma as President of South Africa in February 2018.

== Home Affairs: 2018–2019 ==
On 22 November 2018, Ramaphosa announced a minor cabinet reshuffle, occasioned by Malusi Gigaba's resignation from cabinet. Cwele was appointed to succeed Gigaba as Minister of Home Affairs. His own former portfolio was merged back into the newly renamed Ministry of Communications of Digital Technologies, to be led by Cwele's former deputy, Stella Ndabeni-Abrahams.

In the May 2019 general election, Cwele was re-elected to the National Assembly, ranked 54th on the ANC's national party list. However, after the election, he was sacked from Ramaphosa's second cabinet; Aaron Motsoaledi was appointed to replace him as Minister of Home Affairs. Shortly after the cabinet announcement, Cwele resigned from the National Assembly, with effect from 3 June 2019.

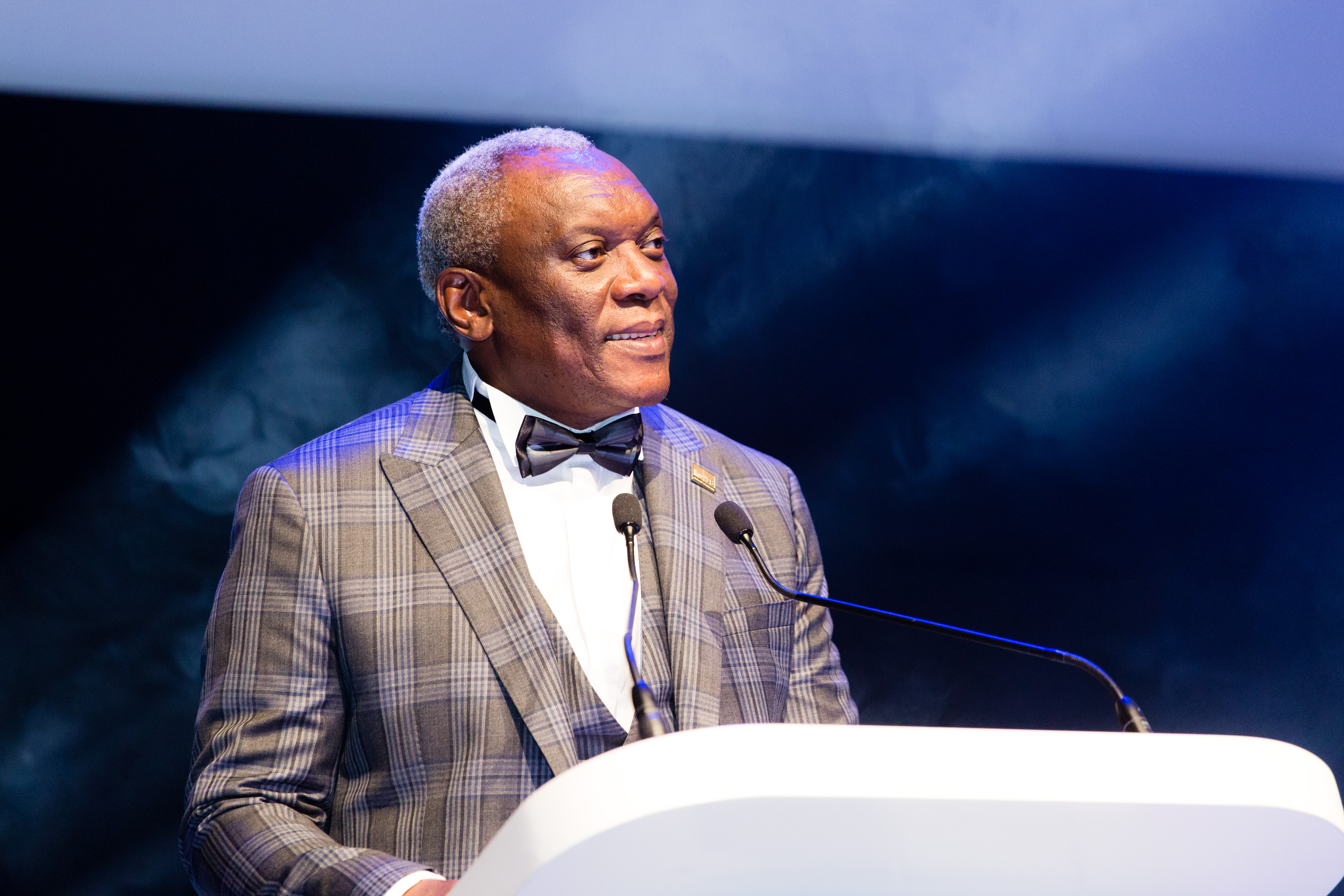
Cwele at ITU Telecom World, 11 September 2018

== Ambassador to China: 2020–present ==
After Cwele resigned from frontline politics, President Ramaphosa designated him as South African Ambassador to China. Although the Sunday Times reported in March 2020 that he had been denied the requisite security clearance, he arrived in Beijing on 4 December 2020 and presented his diplomatic credentials on 23 December. He was not re-elected to the ANC National Executive Committee when his term expired in December 2022.

== Personal life ==
In 1985, he married Sheryl Cwele, with whom he had four children. She was director for health and community services at the Hibiscus Coast Local Municipality until May 2011, when she was convicted of dealing or conspiring to deal in cocaine. Their divorce was finalised in August 2011, and Cwele said in court papers that he had been estranged from his wife since 2000.
