= Thembi Siweya =

South African politician

Thembi Siweya MP
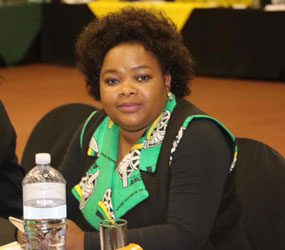
- Siweya in 2019

Deputy Minister in the Presidency
- In office 30 May 2019 – 6 March 2023
- President: Cyril Ramaphosa

Member of the National Assembly of South Africa
- Incumbent
- Assumed office 22 May 2019

Personal details
- Born: Rhulani Thembi Siweya
- Party: African National Congress

Rhulani Thembi Siweya is a South African politician who served as the Deputy Minister in the Presidency.

She has been a Member of the National Assembly of South Africa for the African National Congress since 2019.
