= Lindiwe Zulu =

South African politician

The Honourable Lindiwe Zulu
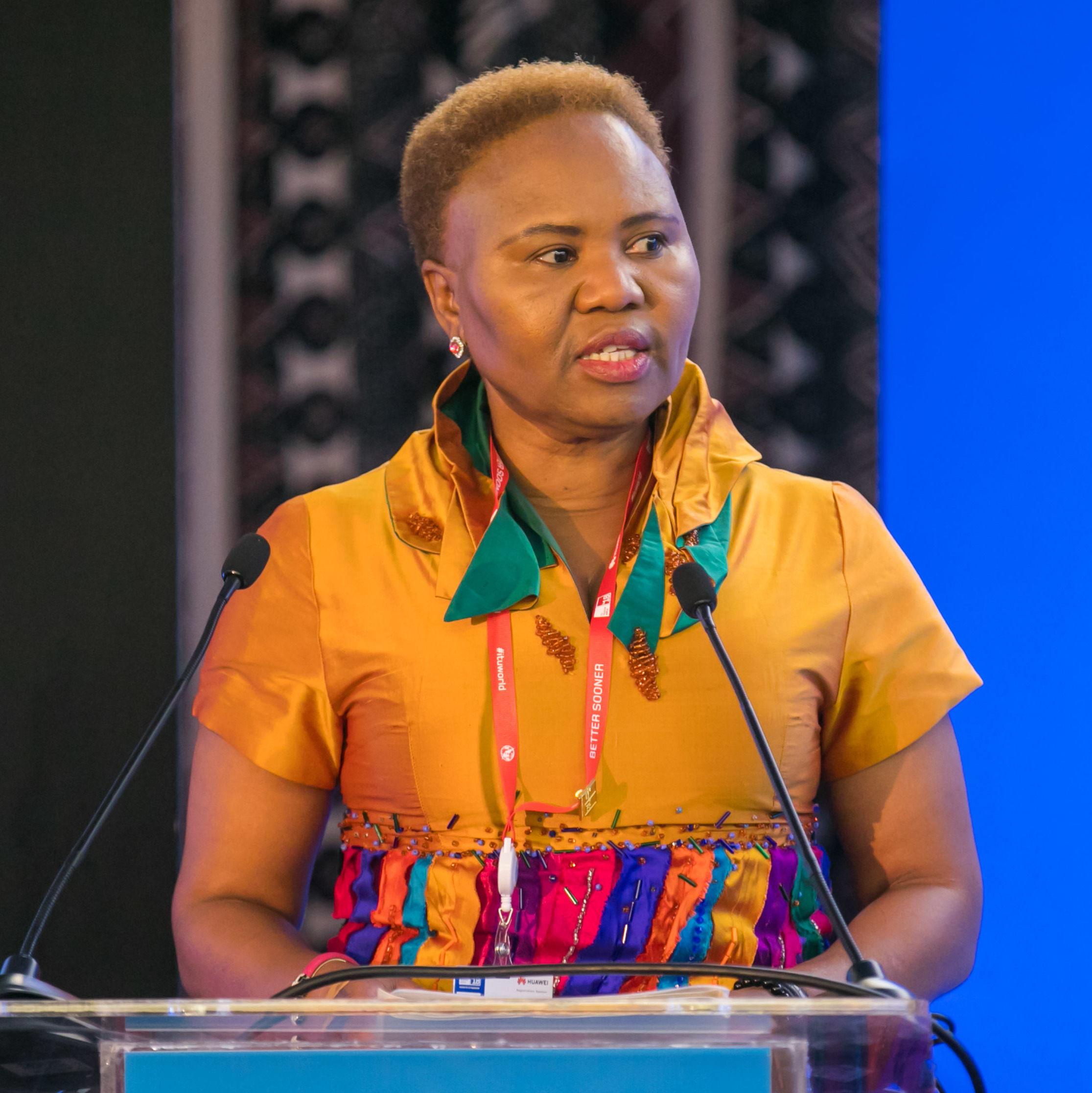
- Zulu in Durban in 2018

Minister of Social Development
- In office 30 May 2019 – 28 May 2024
- President: Cyril Ramaphosa
- Deputy: Hendrietta Bogopane-Zulu
- Preceded by: Susan Shabangu
- Succeeded by: Sisisi Tolashe

Minister of Small Business Development
- In office 25 May 2014 – 29 May 2019
- President: Jacob Zuma; Cyril Ramaphosa
- Deputy: Elizabeth Thabethe
- Preceded by: Portfolio established
- Succeeded by: Khumbudzo Ntshavheni

Member of the National Assembly
- In office 21 May 2014 – 28 May 2024
- In office 6 May 2009 – 6 July 2009

Personal details
- Born: 21 April 1958 (age 68) Nhlazatshe, Eastern Transvaal; Union of South Africa
- Spouse: Kgosietsile Itholeng
- Education: Patrice Lumumba University; Solomon Mahlangu Freedom College

Lindiwe Daphney Zulu (born 21 April 1958) is a South African politician and communications strategist who served as Minister of Social Development from May 2019 to May 2024. Before that she was the Minister of Small Business Development from 2014 to 2019. A member of the African National Congress (ANC), she has served on the party's National Executive Committee since December 2007.

Zulu entered politics during apartheid through the exiled ANC and rose to prominence as head of communications for the ANC Women's League during the negotiations to end apartheid. From 1999 to 2014, she worked in foreign affairs as a diplomat and political adviser; most notably she was South African Ambassador to Brazil from 2004 to 2009 and a foreign affairs adviser to President Jacob Zuma from 2009 to 2014.

She joined the National Assembly and Zuma's second-term cabinet after the 2014 general election. She remained in government for ten years before she lost her parliamentary seat in the 2024 general election.

== Early life and activism ==
Zulu was born on 21 April 1958 in Nhlazatshe in the former Eastern Transvaal. After the village's residents were forcibly removed to Madadeni in KwaZulu, her family moved to Swaziland. In the aftermath of the 1976 Soweto uprising, large numbers of young South African political activists crossed the border into neighbouring Swaziland, and Zulu joined the African National Congress (ANC); her brother joined the Pan Africanist Congress.

Immediately after joining the ANC, she left Swaziland for Mozambique and then for Tanzania, where she attended the Solomon Mahlangu Freedom College. A year into her education there, she received a scholarship to study journalism in Moscow. After seven years, she graduated with a master's degree from the Patrice Lumumba University, by which time she was fluent in Russian. She returned to Tanzania, where she contributed to the ANC's internal newsletters until 1987, when she was sent to Angola for military training. She was the head of communications for the Pan-African Women's Organisation in Angola in 1988, and in 1989 she moved to Lusaka, Zambia, to head communications in the ANC's department of religious affairs. Her final posting, begun in 1990, was as administrator and head of communications in the ANC's Ugandan office.

== Return to South Africa ==
In 1991, during the negotiations to end apartheid, Zulu returned to South Africa and became head of communications for the newly relaunched ANC Women's League. She was elected to the league's National Executive Committee in 1993. Also in 1993, she was seconded to the information and publicity department of the mainstream ANC in order to serve as the party's spokesman ahead of the first post-apartheid elections in 1994.

In the 1994 election, Zulu was elected to an ANC seat in the Gauteng Provincial Legislature. The following year, she was appointed as Deputy Speaker of the Gauteng Provincial Legislature, deputising Trevor Fowler. At the same time, in February 1995, she was a prominent member of a group of ANC Women's League leaders who resigned in protest of Winnie Madikizela-Mandela's leadership of the league.

== Career in foreign affairs ==
From 1999 to 2001, Zulu was a special adviser to the Minister of Foreign Affairs, Nkosazana Dlamini-Zuma. Then, from 2001 to 2003, she worked in the Department of Foreign Affairs as chief director for west and central Africa. She reportedly remained close with Minister Dlamini-Zuma and even was rumoured to be the minister's favoured candidate for promotion to director-general of the department. In 2003, Zulu took a brief hiatus from political work to become an executive for Vodacom, with responsibility for government and international relations.

She remained in the private sector only until 2004, when President Thabo Mbeki appointed her as South African Ambassador to Brazil. She was posted for Brazil for over four years, returning in early 2009, and the Brazilian government later awarded her the Order of Rio Branco for her contribution to Brazil–South Africa relations. During her time in Brazil, at the ANC's 52nd National Conference in December 2007, Zulu was elected for the first time to a five-year term as a member of the ANC's National Executive Committee (NEC). Her candidacy was supported by the Congress of South African Trade Unions.

In the 2009 general election, Zulu was elected to an ANC seat in the National Assembly. However, she served only two months in the seat before resigning on 6 July 2009; her seat was filled by Doris Ngcengwane. Instead, she served as international relations adviser to newly elected President Jacob Zuma. She was also appointed as one of Zuma's three envoys to Zimbabwe, tasked with helping implement the 2008 Zimbabwean peace agreement alongside Charles Nqakula and Mac Maharaj. In 2013, Zulu made public comments about the upcoming Zimbabwean elections that led Robert Mugabe to call her "a stupid, idiotic street woman".

During this period, at the ANC's 53rd National Conference in December 2012, Zulu was re-elected to the ANC NEC. She was also elected to the ANC's National Working Committee and as chairperson of the NEC's subcommittee on communications and media. She remained in the subcommittee until late 2015, when she ceded her place to Jackson Mthembu in order to chair the drafting subcommittee instead. The Mail & Guardian labelled her one of Zuma's "most trusted lieutenants".

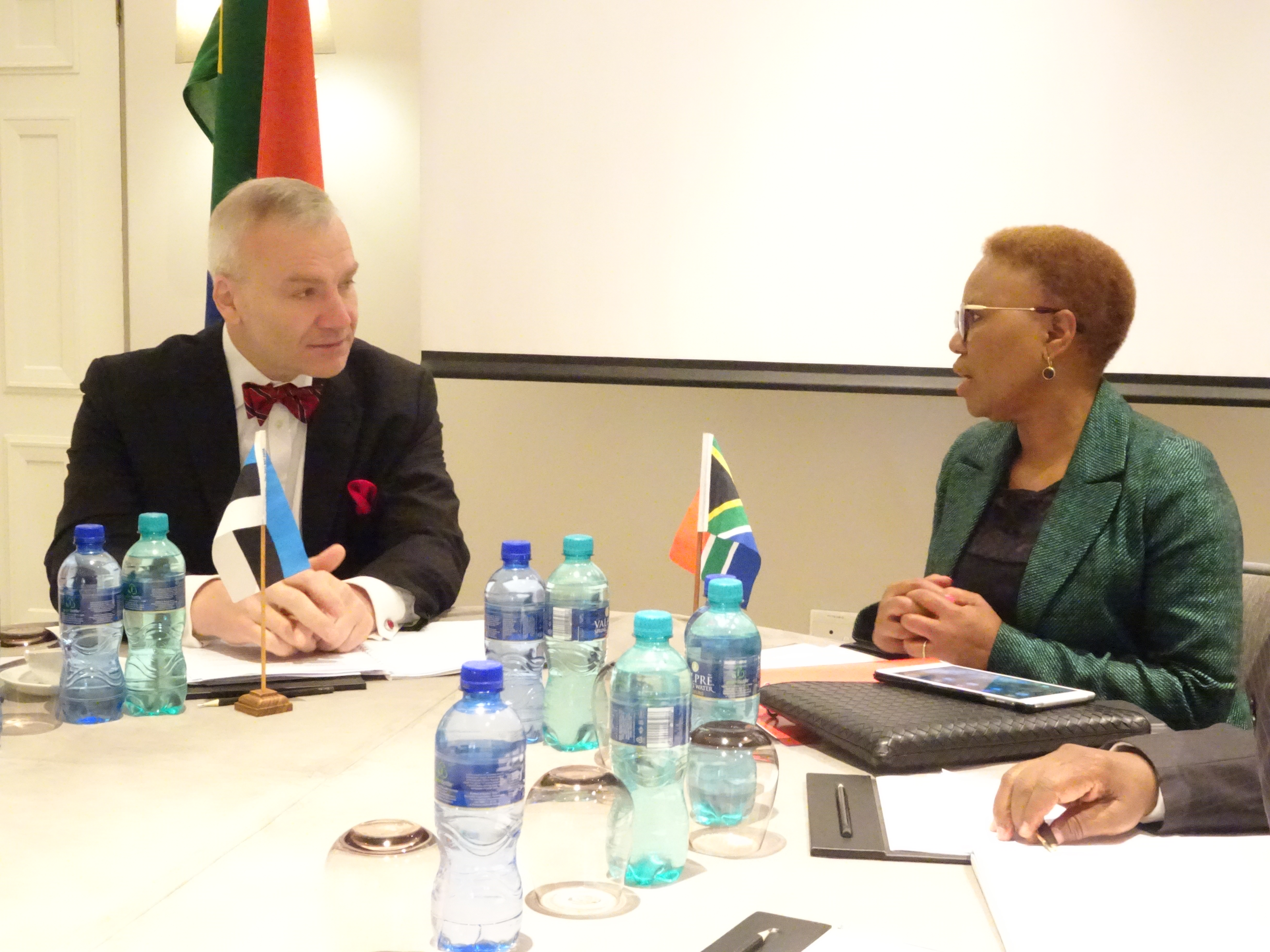
Zulu with Estonian diplomat Väino Reinart in April 2017

== Career in national government ==
=== Minister of Small Business Development: 2014–2019 ===
Zulu returned to the National Assembly in the 2014 general election, and she was appointed to Zuma's cabinet as Minister of Small Business Development, a newly created portfolio. During the controversy that surrounded Zuma's second term, Zulu became reputed as one of Zuma's "fiercest defenders". For example, she defended his controversial December 2015 cabinet reshuffle, claiming that the adverse market response to the reshuffle was the result of politically motivated manipulation, because, "Business wrote off President Zuma a long time ago." During major protests against Zuma's rule in April 2017, Zulu told the press "We will continue to defend the president as members of the ANC, as long as he is a member of the ANC and as long as he remains the president of the country."

At the ANC's 54th National Conference, convened in December 2017 to elect a new president, Zulu endorsed Zuma's preferred successor, her former boss Nkosazana Dlamini-Zuma; she said that it was important to support women candidates in order to ensure gender parity in the party leadership. Dlamini-Zuma was defeated by Zuma's outgoing deputy, Cyril Ramaphosa. However, Zulu herself was re-elected to the NEC at the same conference: by number of votes received, she was the second most popular candidate, behind Zweli Mkhize. Though she was not re-elected to the National Working Committee, she was elected as chairperson of the NEC's subcommittee on international relations.

In 2018, the Public Protector, Busisiwe Mkhwebane, investigated Zulu after Toby Chance of the Democratic Alliance alleged that she had committed misconduct by lying to the National Assembly. Specifically, in November 2017, Zulu told Parliament that she drove a Lexus valued at R580,000, which Chance believed was an underestimation. Mkhwebane found that Zulu's statement had been incorrect – her department had spent R1.8 million on two ministerial BMWs – but cleared her of any misconduct.

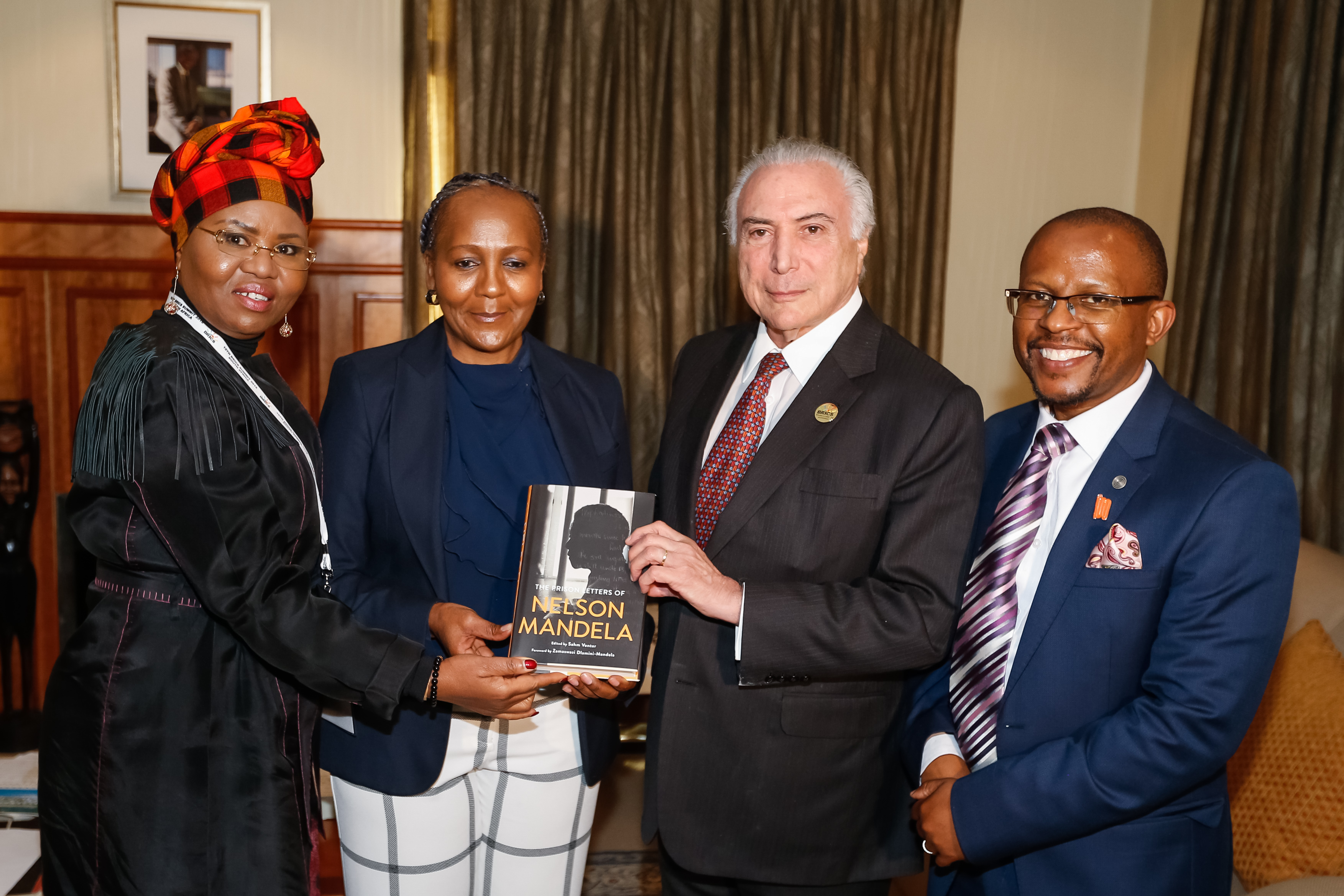
Zulu (far left) with Ndileka Mandela, Brazilian President Michel Temer, and Sello Hatang in July 2018

=== Minister of Social Development: 2019–present ===
After the 2019 general election, President Ramaphosa appointed Zulu as Minister of Social Development, with Hendrietta Bogopane-Zulu as her deputy. In December 2022, at the ANC's 55th National Conference, Zulu was re-elected to the ANC NEC; she was ranked 26th by popularity.

Zulu was ranked 131st on the ANC's national party list in the 2024 general election, making her re-election unlikely. In the election the ANC won only 73 seats from the national list, far below the amount needed for Zulu to be returned to Parliament, and she lost her seat.

== Personal life ==
Zulu is married to Kgosietsile Itholeng, a South African whom she met in the ANC in Angola. They have one son together. Zulu also has three elder children: two girls, born inside South Africa and raised there while Zulu was in exile, and another son, fathered by a Guyanese student in Moscow. She is an amateur long-distance runner.
