= Minister of Telecommunications and Postal Services (South Africa) =

South Africa Minister of Telecommunications and Postal Services
- Flag of South Africa
- Incumbent; None
- Department of Telecommunications and Postal Services
- Style: The Honourable
- Inaugural holder: Siyabonga Cwele
- Formation: 2014
- Abolished: 2018
- Superseded by: Minister of Communications
- Website: Department of Telecommunications and Postal Services

The Minister of Telecommunications and Postal Services was a minister in the Cabinet of South Africa, established in 2014 by President Jacob Zuma. Siyabonga Cwele was the inaugural Minister of Telecommunications and Postal Services. Its role was combined into the Minister of Communications in 2018 under President Cyril Ramaphosa.
