= ITU Telecom World =

- Status: Active
- Genre: ICT (Information and Communication Technologies)
- Venue: ITU Headquarters
- Location: Geneva
- Country: Switzerland
- Inaugurated: 1971
- Organizer: ITU
- Website: https://telecomworld.itu.int/

ITU Telecom is part of the ITU (International Telecommunication Union), the United Nations specialized agency for information and communication technologies – ICTs. ITU Telecom organizes the global ITU Telecom World event, the platform for innovation showcasing, high-level debate, knowledge sharing and networking for the governments, industry leaders, small and medium enterprises (SMEs) and regulators that form part of the world's ICT community. The first ITU Telecom event was held in 1971. Since its fortieth anniversary in 2011, ITU Telecom World has been held on an annual basis in a different location worldwide. 2020's event will be ITU Digital World, taking place online from 20–22 October. ITU Digital World 2021 will be back in its usual form in Ha Noi Viet Nam in October 2021.

== History ==
In 1985, the ITU Telecom staged its first regional telecommunication exhibition in the Asia-Pacific region – Asia Telecom85. This was followed the next year by its first regional event in the Africa region – Africa Telecom86. Regional telecommunication exhibitions continued with the first such events in the Americas region – Americas Telecom 88 and in the Europe region - Europa Telecom 1992. Telecom events were held on a regional or global basis every year, adopting the ITU Telecom World name for the first time at the Geneva event in 2003. The final event to be held in this format was ITU Telecom World 2009 which was attended by over 2,250 VIPs, including UN Secretary-General Ban Ki-moon, Heads of State, Heads of Government, Ministers, Ambassadors, heads of regulatory agencies, and CEOs from around the world. Through a series of top-level roundtables, meetings and debates, the event addressed pressing issues such as climate change, global economic recovery and cybersecurity.

Marking the 40th anniversary of the event, ITU Telecom World 2011 introduced a new format focused on facilitating knowledge sharing, networking, deal-making and consensus.building, with 6500 industry professionals taking part. ITU Telecom World 2012 took place in Dubai, where it was hosted by the UAE Telecommunications Regulatory Authority. The event moved to Bangkok, Thailand, for ITU Telecom World 2013, and to Doha, Qatar, for ITU Telecom World 2014.

== ITU Telecom World 2015 ==
ITU Telecom World 2015 took place from 12–15 October 2015 in Budapest, Hungary.

== ITU Telecom World 2016 ==
ITU Telecom World 2016 took place from 14–17 November in Bangkok, Thailand, on the central theme of Collaborating in the Digital Economy.

== ITU Telecom World 2017 ==
ITU Telecom World 2017 took place in the city of Busan, Republic of Korea, from 25–28 September 2017.

== ITU Telecom World 2018 ==
ITU Telecom World 2018 took place in Durban, South Africa from 10–13 September 2018

== ITU Telecom World 2019 ==
ITU Telecom World 2019 took place in Budapest, Hungary from 9–12 September 2019

== Past events ==
- Telecom 71 (Geneva)
- Telecom 75 (Geneva)
- Telecom 79 (Geneva)
- Telecom 83 (Geneva)
- Asia Telecom 1985 (Singapore)
- Africa Telecom 1986 (Nairobi)
- Telecom 87 (Geneva)
- Americas Telecom 1988 (Rio)
- Asia Telecom 1989 (Singapore)
- Africa Telecom 1990 (Harare)
- Telecom 91(Geneva)
- Europa Telecom 1992 (Budapest)
- Americas Telecom 1992 (Acapulco)
- Asia Telecom 1993 (Singapore)
- Africa Telecom 1994 (Cairo)
- Telecom 95 (Geneva)
- Americas Telecom 1996 (Rio)
- Interactive 97(Geneva)
- Asia Telecom 1997 (Singapore)
- Africa Telecom 1998 (Johannesburg)
- Telecom 99 (Geneva)
- ITU Telecom Asia 2000 (Hong Kong)
- ITU Telecom Americas 2000 (Rio)
- ITU Telecom Africa 2001 (Johannesburg)
- ITU Telecom Asia 2002 (Hong Kong)
- ITU Telecom Americas 2003 (Buenos Aires)
- ITU Telecom World 2003 (Geneva)
- ITU Telecom Africa 2004 (Cairo)
- ITU Telecom Asia 2004 (Busan)
- ITU Telecom Americas 2005 (Bahia)
- ITU Telecom World 2006 (Hong Kong)
- ITU Telecom Asia 2008 (Bangkok)
- ITU Telecom Africa 2008 (Cairo)
- ITU Telecom World 2009 (Geneva)
- ITU Telecom World 2011 (Geneva)
- ITU Telecom World 2012 (Dubai)
- ITU Telecom World 2013 (Bangkok)
- ITU Telecom World 2014 (Doha)
- ITU Telecom World 2015 (Budapest)
- ITU Telecom World 2016 (Bangkok)
- ITU Telecom World 2017 (Busan, Republic of Korea)
- ITU Telecom World 2018 (Durban)
- ITU Telecom World 2019 (Budapest)
