= Tsotso Tlhapi =

South African politician (born 1979)

Tsotso Tlhapi MPL

MEC for Arts, Culture, Sports and Recreation
- Incumbent
- Assumed office 1 October 2024
- Premier: Lazzy Mokgosi
- Preceded by: Collen Maine
- In office 28 May 2019 – 22 November 2022
- Premier: Bushy Maape; Job Mokgoro
- Preceded by: Ontlametse Mochware
- Succeeded by: Kenetswe Mosenogi

MEC for Economic Development, Environment, Conservation and Tourism in the North West
- In office 22 November 2022 – 14 June 2024
- Premier: Bushy Maape
- Preceded by: Kenetswe Mosenogi
- Succeeded by: Bitsa Lenkopane

Member of the North West Provincial Legislature
- Incumbent
- Assumed office 2 August 2016
- Preceded by: Kgakgamatso Nkewu

Personal details
- Born: 9 October 1979 (age 47)
- Party: African National Congress

Galebekwe Virginia Tsotso Tlhapi (born 9 October 1979) is a South African politician who currently serves as the MEC for Arts, Culture, Sports and Recreation, in office since October 2024. She previously held the portfolio from May 2019 until November 2022 and served as the MEC for Economic Development, Environment, Conservation and Tourism in the North West from November 2022 until June 2024. She is a member of the North West Provincial Legislature for the African National Congress.

== Political career ==
Tlhapi is a member of the African National Congress and a former member of the African National Congress Youth League. She is the former acting chairperson of the ANC Youth League in the North West, a former member of the regional executive committee of the ANC Youth League in the Bojanala region, and a former member of the mayoral committee for Local Economic Development in the Bojanala District Municipality. Tlhapi was sworn in as a member of the North West Provincial Legislature on 2 August 2016.

Following the 2019 national and provincial elections, she was appointed as the Member of the Executive Council for Arts, Culture, Sports and Recreation in the North West Provincial Government by premier Job Mokgoro.

On 22 November 2022, Tlhapi was appointed MEC for Economic Development, Environment, Conservation and Tourism. She served until June 2024, when Bitsa Lenkopane was appointed to the position by the newly elected premier Lazarus Mokgosi. In October 2024, Tlhapi returned to the Executive Council in October 2024 as the MEC for Arts, Culture, Sports and Recreation.

Political offices
Preceded by Collen Maine	MEC for Arts, Culture, Sports and Recreation in the North West; 2024 – present	Succeeded by Incumbent
Preceded by Kenetswe Mosenogi	MEC for Economic Development, Environment, Conservation and Tourism in the North West; 2022 – 2024	Succeeded by Bitsa Lenkopane
Preceded by Ontlametse Mochware	MEC for Arts, Culture, Sports and Recreation in the North West; 2019 – 2022	Succeeded by Kenetswe Mosenogi
