= Phumzile =

Phumzile is a feminine given name. Notable people with the name include:

- Phumzile Bhengu-Kombe, South African politician
- Phumzile Van Damme (born 1983), South African politician and activist
- Phumzile Khanyile (born 1991), South African photographer
- Phumzile Maqondwana (born 1997), South African rugby player
- Phumzile Matyhila (born 1975), South African boxer
- Phumzile Mbatha-Cele, South African politician
- Phumzile Mgcina (born 1990), South African politician
- Phumzile Mlambo-Ngcuka (born 1955), South African politician
