= A. P. Mda =

South African teacher, lawyer and political activist (1916-1993)

Ashby Solomzi Peter Mda
- Born: 6 April 1916; Herschel District, Eastern Cape, Union of South Africa
- Died: 7 August 1993 (aged 77); Bloemfontein, South Africa
- Education: University of South Africa (BA)
- Occupations: Lawyer, teacher
- Known for: Early founders of the African National Congress Youth League and the Pan Africanist Congress of Azania
- Children: Zakes Mda

Ashby Solomzi Peter Mda (6 April 1916 – 7 August 1993), also known as A. P. Mda was a South African teacher, lawyer, political activist and co-founder of the African National Congress Youth League (ANCYL). He was also one of the founders of the Pan Africanist Congress of Azania.

== Personal life ==
Peter Mda was born the 6 April 1916 in the Herschel District of the Eastern Cape. He was given the name “Ashby” as he was born on Ash Wednesday. He took the name “Peter” after joining the Catholic church.

His mother, Mildred Mei, worked as a school teacher and his father, Gxumekelani Charles Mda, was a peasant farmer, headman and local shoemaker.

== Education ==
Mda's parents were members of the Anglican church, however, A.P. Mda and his siblings attended the local Catholic school. Mda later attended other Catholic schools, namely St Francis School in Aliwal North and Mariazell School north of Matatiele. Mda pursued a Bachelor of Arts degree at the University of South Africa (UNISA). Mda also studied law through correspondence courses and eventually graduated with a law degree.

== Career ==
After qualifying as a teacher, Mda was unable to secure employment in the Eastern Cape. He then found work as a gardener and cook in East London. He moved to Witwatersrand in an attempt to secure a teaching job teaching but remained unsuccessful. He continued to work in Witwatersrand as a gardener, cook and then a steel foundry. He eventually found a teaching post at Germiston Catholic Primary. He also worked at St John Berchman, a primary school in Orlando, Soweto from 1938. He continued to study through correspondence as to eventually become a lawyer.

== Political career ==
A. P. Mda began his political career at the All African Convention (AAC) meeting in Bloemfontein in 1936. He attended the meeting to cover the proceedings for Umlindi we Nyanga, an East London newspaper. A. P. Mda defended the AAC leader, D. D. T. Jabavu, who was suspected of betraying their mandate and having dealings with J. B. M. Hertzog with regards to the Hertzog Bill of 1936. As support for the AAC dwindled, Mda began advocating for African Nationalism which, according to Mda, had excluded non-African groups. Mda then became a supporter of Dr A. B. Xuma and the African National Congress (ANC).

Mda participated in the African Teachers Campaign advocating for higher wages in 1940 which was led by the Transvaal African Teachers' Association (TATA). Mda was the chair of the Pimville branch of the Salary Campaign Committee at the next TATA gathering at the Wilberforce institute. Other members of the committee included David Bopane, Edward Manyosi, M. Maubela, M. Kekana, Sydney Maseko and E.S. Molepo. He was also part of the Catholic African Teachers Union (CATU) which was against the wage campaign.

Mda later played a pivotal role in the formation of the African National Congress Youth League (ANCYL). Mda formed a strong intellectual and political relationship with Anton Lembede soon after Lembede arrived in Johannesburg. Mda, Lembede and Jordan Ngubane, assistant editor of the Bantu World, were mandated to draw up the manifesto of the ANCYL. Lembede died suddenly on 29 July 1947. Shortly thereafter, Mda was named the acting president of the ANCYL and was formally elected into the position in 1948.

Mda set up a working committee consisting of Nelson Mandela, Walter Sisulu and Oliver Tambo to manage the activities of the ANCYL. Mda selected Fort Hare to expand their influence as the institution had a strong Black student community. The ANCYL also established branches in Natal and the Cape Province. The Fort Hare branch was officially launched in November 1948.

The ANCYL, under Mda's leadership, started the Programme of Action (PA) at the ANC's Cape provincial office in Port Elizabeth in June 1949. The ANCYL adopted the PA. Xuma's term at the helm of the ANC was coming to an end and Mda and other members of the ANCYL started seeking a replacement who would endorse the PA at the following national ANC conference in 1949. Oliver Tambo went to James Moroka's home in Bantu location to encourage him to stand as a presidential candidate. Moroka was elected as president and the PA was adopted in 1949 as the ANC's guiding document. Mda then stepped down from the ANCYL after Moroka's appointment. He continued to work behind the scenes to ensure that the ANC remained committed to its nationalist ideals. Mda later grew weary of Moroka's leadership and wrote public letters of disapproval condemning the ANC leadership in the publication “Bantu World”. Mda noticed a “watering down” of African Nationalism by Oliver Tambo, Nelson Mandela and Walter Sisulu as the new leadership started forming multi-racial alliances including Coloured, Indian and White anti-Apartheid organisations.

=== Political philosophy ===
Mda was often quoted as supporting a form of African Nationalism which should not be used to justify segregation and separate development. Mda was against the Communist Party of South Africa (CPSA) which was possibly due to his Catholic upbringing. He believed that the CPSA planned to infiltrate and take over the ANC.

Mda is also described as the “founding spirit" of the Pan Africanist Congress of Azania (PAC) which broke away from the ANC in 1959. This group included John Nyathi Pokela, Potlako Leballo and Robert Sobukwe. Mda also developed the motto “Serve, Sacrifice and Suffering.” In the early 1990s, Mda, along with the rest of the PAC, was reluctant to join the Convention for the Establishment of Democracy in South Africa, known as CODESA.

== Family ==
His son Zakes Mda was born in the Eastern Cape in 1948. A.P. migrated with his entire family to Lesotho when he was sent into exile. Mda charged his clients very little for his services throughout his career. His family suffered due to this. They later lived in a township in a house with a rusty corrugated roof, no ceiling and no electricity. Mda died on the 7 August 1993 due to heart failure.

== See also ==
- Jan Smuts and the Old Boers
- Alcott ‘Skei’ Gwentshe
