= Fenny Gaolaolwe =

South African politician

Member of the North West Executive Council for Social Development
- In office 6 December 2018 – 7 May 2019
- Premier: Job Mokgoro
- Preceded by: Hoffman Galeng
- Succeeded by: Boitumelo Moiloa
- In office 27 May 2014 – 8 May 2016
- Premier: Supra Mahumapelo
- Preceded by: Ontlametse Mochware
- Succeeded by: Kgakgamatso Nkewu

Member of the North West Executive Council for Local Government and Human Settlement
- In office 8 May 2016 – 6 December 2018
- Premier: Supra Mahumpelo; Job Mokgoro
- Preceded by: Collen Maine
- Succeeded by: Motlalepula Rosho

Personal details
- Citizenship: South Africa
- Party: African National Congress

Galaletsang Fenny Gaolaolwe, known as Fenny Motladiile, is a South African politician who represented the African National Congress (ANC) in the North West Provincial Legislature until May 2019, when she failed to gain re-election to her seat. Between 2014 and 2019, she served in the North West Executive Council under Premiers Supra Mahumapelo and Job Mokgoro: she served as the North West's Member of the Executive Council (MEC) for Social Development from 2014 to 2016 and 2018 to 2019 and as MEC for Local Government and Human Settlement from 2016 to 2018.

== Legislative career ==
Gaolaolwe was narrowly elected to the North West Provincial Legislature in the 2009 general election, ranked 25th on the ANC's provincial party list, and she was re-elected in the 2014 general election, ranked 23rd. After the 2014 election, Gaolaolwe was appointed to the North West Executive Council as MEC for Social Development. Premier Supra Mahumapelo had initially appointed Ontlametse Mochware to that portfolio, but Mochware had resigned almost immediately due to a legal technicality.

On 8 May 2016, Mahumapelo announced a reshuffle in which Gaolaolwe was moved to a new portfolio as MEC for Local Government and Human Settlement. She succeeded Collen Maine, who had vacated the position after being elected President of the ANC Youth League. In addition, Gaolaolwe acted as Social Development MEC from July 2016 until August 2017 following the death of the incumbent, Kgakgamatso Nkewu.

She remained in office as Local Government and Human Settlement MEC throughout the rest of Mahumapelo's premiership and into the tenure of Mahumapelo's successor, Premier Job Mokgoro. In Mokgoro's first reshuffle, announced on 6 December 2018, she was returned to her old position as MEC for Social Development. She remained in that office until the 2019 general election, when she was ranked 30th on the ANC's party list and failed to gain re-election to the provincial legislature.
