= Tsakani Shiviti =

South African politician

Member of the National Assembly
- In office 14 June 2024 – 13 February 2026
- Succeeded by: Zama Khanyase

Secretary-General of the African National Congress Youth League
- Incumbent
- Assumed office 16 December 2025
- President: Collen Malatji
- Preceded by: Mntuwoxolo Ngudle

Deputy Secretary-General of the African National Congress Youth League
- In office 16 July 2023 – 28 May 2024 Serving with Olga Seate
- President: Collen Malatji
- Secretary-General: Mntuwoxolo Ngudle
- Preceded by: Thandi Moraka

Personal details
- Born: Tsakani Goodness Shiviti; 12 May 1991 (age 35) Malamulele, Northern Transvaal; South Africa
- Party: African National Congress
- Education: University of Limpopo

Tsakani Goodness Shiviti (born 12 May 1991) is a South African politician who represented the African National Congress (ANC) in the National Assembly from June 2024 to February 2026. She is also the deputy secretary-general of the ANC Youth League. In the National Assembly, she was the chairperson of the Portfolio Committee on Science, Technology and Innovation.

== Early life and education ==
Born on 12 May 1991, Shiviti was born and raised in Mapapila, a village in Malamulele in present-day Limpopo. She and her six siblings were raised by her grandmother while their parents worked in Gauteng. Her family is Tsonga.

After high school, she left home without her parents' support to attend the University of Limpopo, enrolling with the assistance of the South African Students Congress (SASCO) and the money that she had saved as an amateur hairdresser. She graduated with Bachelor of Arts in communications. In the interim, she was elected as SASCO deputy president in 2016, at the height of the #FeesMustFall student protests.

== Political career ==
After her graduation, Shiviti served on the boards of the Small Enterprise Finance Agency and Small Enterprise Development Agency. On 1 July 2023, she was elected as deputy secretary-general of the African National Congress (ANC) Youth League, deputising secretary-general Mntuwoxolo Ngudle; at the same elective conference, Olga Seate was elected to the newly created position of second deputy secretary-general.

In the May 2024 general election, Shiviti was elected to represent the ANC in the National Assembly of South Africa. She sits in the Portfolio Committee on Science, Technology and Innovation, which, during its first meeting on 10 July 2024, unanimously elected her as its chairperson. In that capacity, in November 2024, she expressed concern about the pace of South Africa's transition to electric vehicles, arguing that the market-wide transition should be preceded by a smaller pilot programme in government in order to avoid "real market disruption". Later the same month the SABC quoted her encouraging the youth at a political rally in Mbombela to participate in the economy and to reclaim the spaza shop sector.

She resigned in February 2026 and was replaced by Zama Khanyase.

== Personal life ==
Shiviti is Christian.

== See also ==
- List of National Assembly members of the 28th Parliament of South Africa
