= History of South Africa (1948–1994) =

Apartheid South Africa
- 1948–1994
History of South Africa (1910–1948)	History of South Africa (1994–present)
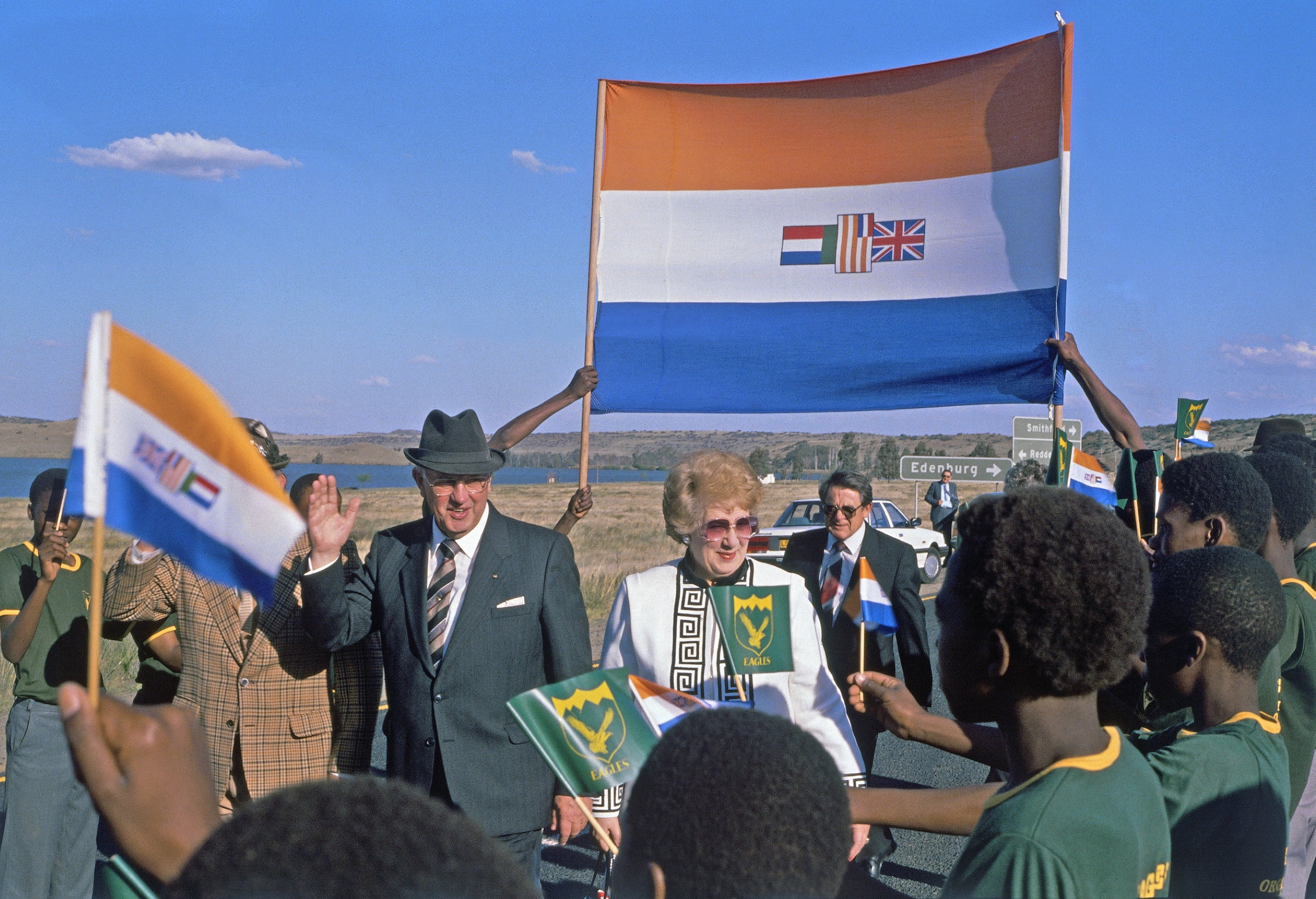
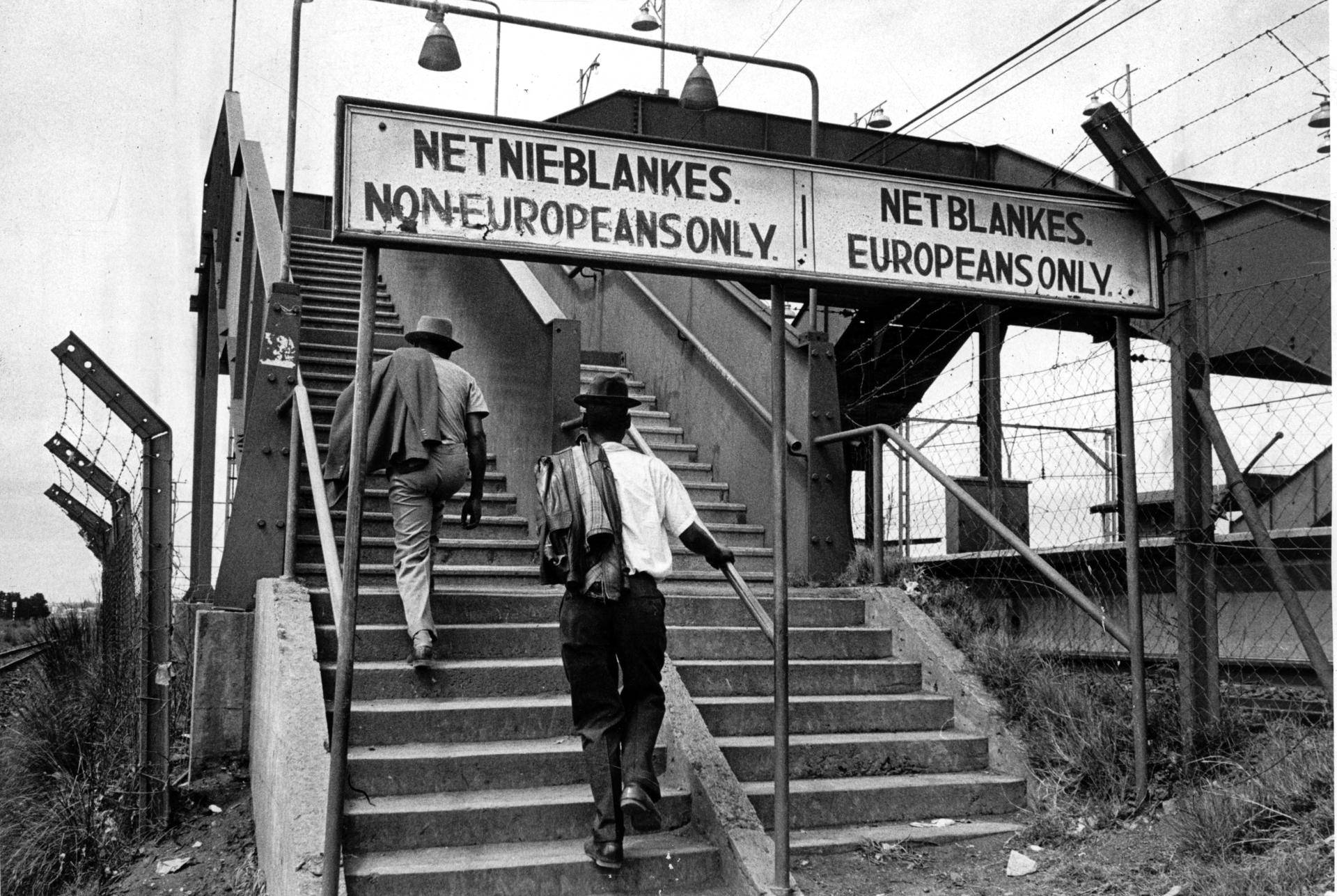
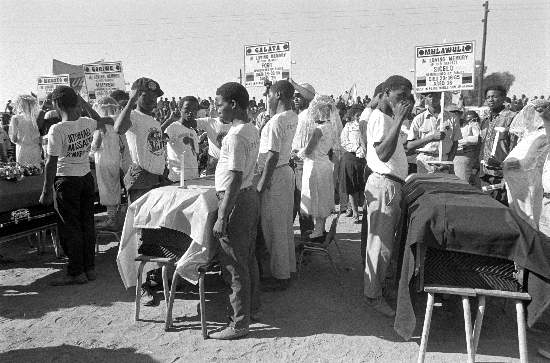
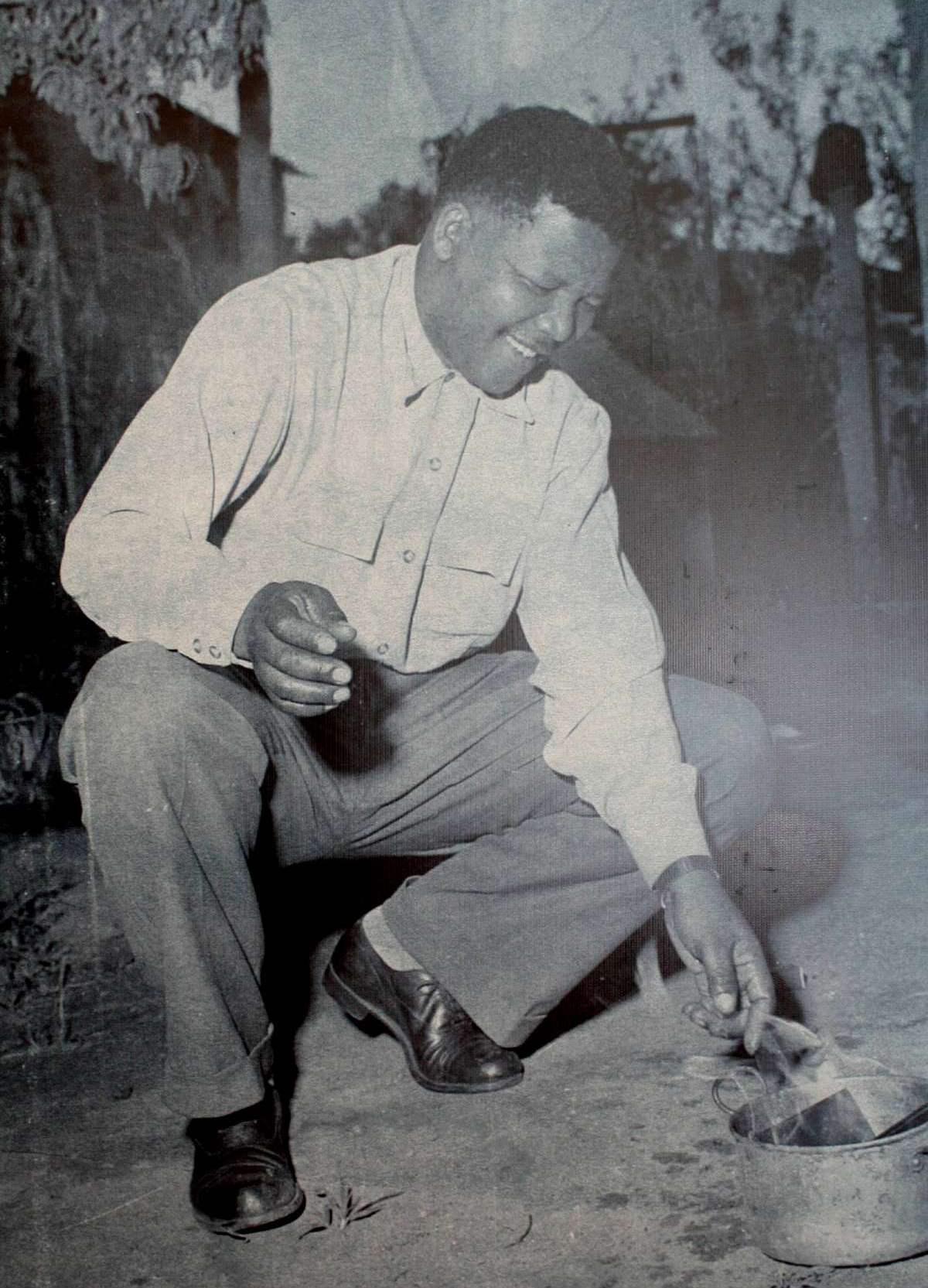
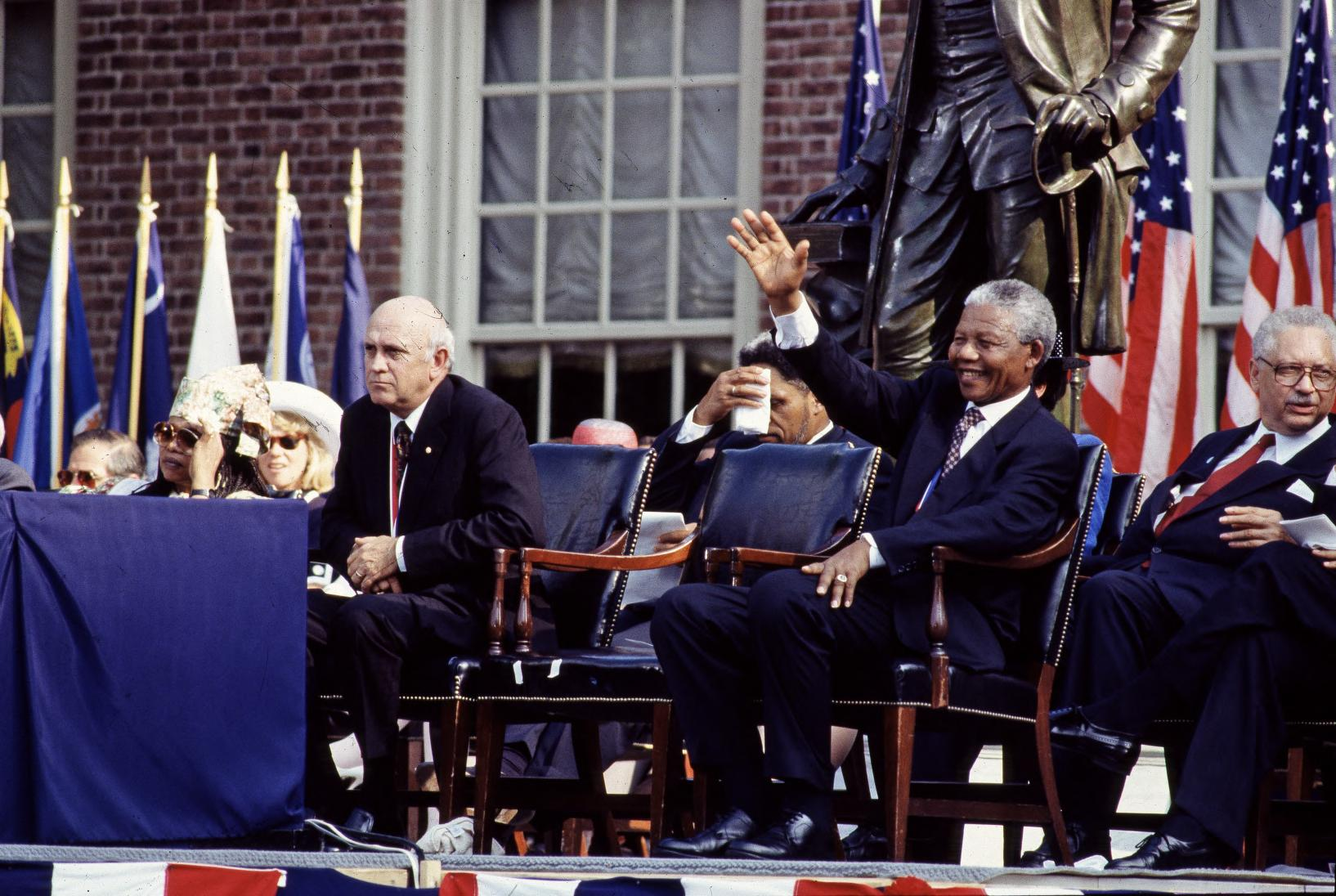
- From top to bottom; left to right: President Pieter Willem Botha at a public appearance in 1989, the old South African flag is being held up in the background.; Photograph of segregational signs at a South-African train station.; Funeral of the Cradock Four.; Nelson Mandela burns his passbook in 1960 as part of a civil disobedience campaign against apartheid.; F. W. de Klerk and Nelson Mandela in Philadelphia during their negotiations to end apartheid in 1993.
- Location: South Africa; South West Africa (today Namibia)
- Including: List: Apartheid; 1961 constitution; 1983 constitution; Weapons of mass destruction; Internal resistance to apartheid; International sanctions during apartheid
- Leaders: List: Daniel Malan; J. G. Strijdom; Hendrik Verwoerd; Balthazar Johannes Vorster; Pieter Willem Botha; Frederik Willem de Klerk
- Key events: Events: 1948 general elections; Defiance Campaign; Sharpeville massacre; South African Border War; Soweto uprising; 1983 referendum; 1992 referendum; Negotiations to end apartheid in South Africa; 1994 general elections

In the history of South Africa, the Apartheid era (1948–1994) was the period of white-minority rule established with the promulgation of the apartheid system of racial segregation in 1948. The Apartheid era began with the election of the National Party (NP) in the 1948 South African general election whose governments established white minority rule of a majority black African country. In the 1990s, formal negotiations to end apartheid and the white-minority government of the National Party culminated in the 1994 South African general election, wherein all South Africans of every race were free to vote for their government.

== 1948 general election ==
The 1948 general elections were a turning point in the history of South Africa. The United Party (UP) and their leader, Jan Smuts, despite receiving 11.48% more of the popular vote than the Herenigde Nasionale Party (HNP), (49.18% UP to 37.70% HNP), were defeated by the HNP, led by the cleric D. F. Malan, of the Dutch Reformed church.

South Africa had allowed social custom and law to govern the consideration of multiracial affairs and of the allocation, in racial terms, of access to economic, social, and political status. Nevertheless, by 1948 it remained apparent that there were gaps in the social structure, whether legislated or otherwise, concerning the rights and opportunities of non-whites. The rapid economic development of World War II attracted black migrant workers in large numbers to chief industrial centres, where they compensated for the wartime shortage of white labour. However, this escalated rate of black urbanisation went unrecognised by the South African government, which failed to accommodate the influx with parallel expansion in housing or social services. Overcrowding, increasing crime rates, and disillusionment resulted; urban blacks came to support a new generation of leaders influenced by the principles of self-determination and popular freedoms enshrined in such statements as the Atlantic Charter. Black political organisations and leaders such as Alfred Xuma, James Mpanza, the African National Congress, and the Council of Non-European Trade Unions began demanding political rights, land reform, and the right to unionise.

Whites reacted negatively to the changes, allowing the Herenigde Nasionale Party (or simply the National Party) to convince a large segment of the voting bloc that the impotence of the United Party in curtailing the evolving position of non-whites indicated that the organisation had fallen under the influence of Western liberals. Many Afrikaners resented what they perceived as disempowerment by an underpaid black workforce and the superior economic power and prosperity of white English speakers. Smuts, as a strong advocate of the United Nations, lost domestic support when South Africa was criticised for its colour bar and the continued mandate of South West Africa by other UN member states.

Given the established racial segregation of the society and the limited access to the right-to-vote for coloured people, those who voted were almost exclusively white, only accounting for 20% of the population of South Africa. Few coloured people and few Asians were allowed to vote, and black Africans had no right to vote since the late 1930s., A few Africans qualified to vote for white MPs, in a separate election. The electoral campaigns of the UP and the HNP required political coalitions with the minor political parties; the UP aligned with the leftist Labour Party and the Afrikaner Party aligned with the HNP to promote the white-supremacy rights of Afrikaners.

The HNP capitalised on the fears of many White South Africans who felt threatened by black political aspirations, pledging to enforce strict racial segregation and white domination in all areas of life. This policy was initially expounded from a theory drafted by Hendrik Verwoerd and was presented to the National Party by the Sauer Commission. It called for a systematic effort to organise the relations, rights, and privileges of the races as officially defined through a series of parliamentary acts and administrative decrees extended across the state. Segregation had thus far been pursued only in matters such as separate schools, and local society rather than law. The commission's goal was to completely remove blacks from areas designated for whites, including cities, with the exception of temporary migrant labour. Blacks would then be encouraged to create their own political units on land reserved for them. The party called this system "apartheid" (meaning "apartness" or "separation") and promised safety and security from supposed black-on-white crime. Apartheid was to be the basic ideological and practical foundation of Afrikaner politics for the next quarter of a century.

The National Party's election platform stressed that apartheid would preserve a market for white employment in which non-whites could not compete. On the issues of black urbanisation, the regulation of non-white labour, "influx control", social security, farm tariffs and non-white taxation, the United Party's policy remained contradictory and confused. Its traditional bases of support not only took mutually exclusive positions, but found themselves increasingly at odds with each other. Smuts' reluctance to consider South African foreign policy against the mounting tensions of the Cold War also stirred up discontent, while the nationalists promised to purge the state and public service of communist sympathisers.

The first to desert the United Party were Afrikaner farmers, who wished to see a change in influx control due to problems with squatters, as well as higher prices for their maize and other produce in the face of the mineowners' demand for cheap food policies. Typically identified with the affluent and capitalist, the party failed to appeal to its working class constituents.

Populist rhetoric allowed the National Party to sweep eight constituencies in the mining and industrial centres of the Witwatersrand and five more in Pretoria. Barring the predominantly English-speaking landowner electorate of the Natal, the United Party was defeated in almost every rural district. Its urban losses in the nation's most populous province, the Transvaal, proved equally devastating. As the voting system was disproportionately weighted in favour of rural constituencies and the Transvaal in particular, the 1948 election catapulted the Herenigde Nasionale Party from a small minority party to a commanding position with an eight-vote parliamentary lead. Daniel François Malan became the first nationalist prime minister, with the aim of implementing the apartheid philosophy and silencing liberal opposition.

When the National Party came to power in 1948, there were factional differences in the party about the implementation of systemic racial segregation. The "baasskap" (white domination or supremacist) faction, which was the dominant faction in the NP and state institutions, favoured systemic segregation, but also favoured the participation of black Africans in the economy, with black labour controlled to advance the economic gains of Afrikaners. A second faction were the "purists", who believed in "vertical segregation", in which blacks and whites would be entirely separated, with blacks living in native reserves with separate political and economic structures, which they believed would entail severe short-term pain, but would also lead to independence of white South Africa from black labour in the long term. A third faction, which included Hendrik Verwoerd, sympathised with the purists, but allowed for the use of black labour, while implementing the purist goal of vertical separation. Verwoerd would refer to this policy as a policy of "good neighbourliness" as a means of justifying such segregation.

The elections marked the start of 46 years of National Party (NP) rule in South Africa, leading to the formal introduction of apartheid and the gradual development of a herrenvolk democracy that persisted until the 1994 election.

== Apartheid legislation ==
Although apartheid as a comprehensive legislative project truly began after the HNP came into power in 1948, many of these statutes were preceded by the laws of the previous British and Afrikaner administrations in South Africa's provinces. An early example is the Glen Grey Act, passed in 1894 in Cape Colony, which diminished the land rights of Africans in scheduled areas.

The state passed laws that paved the way for "grand apartheid", which was centred on separating races on a large scale by compelling people to live in separate places defined by race. This strategy was in part adopted from "left-over" British rule that separated different racial groups after they took control of the Boer republics in the Anglo-Boer war. This created black-only "townships" or "locations", where blacks were relocated to. As the HNP government's minister of native affairs from 1950, Hendrik Verwoerd had a significant role in crafting such laws, which led to him being regarded as the 'Architect of Apartheid'. In addition, many "petty apartheid" laws were passed, which segregated public facilities and social events.

The first two grand apartheid laws were the Population Registration Act, 1950, and the Group Areas Act, 1950, which divided urban areas into "group areas" in which ownership and residence was restricted to certain population groups. Under the Population Registration Act, racial classification was formalised and required every person over 18 to carry an identity card detailing their racial classification, enabling greater census and subsequent racial profiling. Official teams or boards were established to come to a conclusion on those people whose race was unclear. This caused difficulty, especially for the multiracial Coloured people, whose families were separated when members were assigned to different races.

== Other policies ==
Alongside apartheid, the National Party implemented a programme of social conservatism. Pornography, gambling and works from Marx, Lenin and other socialist thinkers were banned. Cinemas, shops selling alcohol and most other businesses were forbidden from opening on Sundays. Abortion, homosexuality and sex education were also restricted; abortion was legal only in cases of rape or if the mother's life was threatened.

Television was not introduced until 1976 because the government viewed English programming as a threat to the Afrikaans language. Television was run on apartheid lines – TV1 broadcast in Afrikaans and English (geared to a White audience), TV2 in Zulu and Xhosa, TV3 in Sotho, Tswana and Pedi (both geared to a Black audience), and TV4 mostly showed programmes for an urban Black audience.

== Early internal resistance ==
The initial decade of National Party rule was met with a concerted campaign of non-violent resistance and mass mobilization, largely orchestrated by the African National Congress (ANC) and its allies in the Congress Alliance, which included the South African Indian Congress, the Coloured People's Congress, and the (white) Congress of Democrats.

A key turning point was the Defiance Campaign of 1952, in which over 8,000 volunteers deliberately violated apartheid laws, primarily pass laws and segregated facilities, leading to arrests. This campaign of non-violent civil disobedience massively increased ANC membership and signaled a new phase of mass protest.

In 1955, the Congress Alliance convened the Congress of the People in Kliptown, where delegates adopted the Freedom Charter. This document became the foundational vision for the liberation movement, calling for a non-racial and democratic state.

In 1956, one of the largest protests in South African history took place when 20,000 women marched on the Union Buildings in Pretoria to protest the extension of pass laws to women. Led by figures such as Lilian Ngoyi, Helen Joseph, and Rahima Moosa, the march became an iconic moment of female-led resistance.

The state responded with severe repression. In 1956, it arrested 156 leaders of the Congress Alliance and charged them with high treason in what became known as the Treason Trial. The trial lasted until 1961, ultimately ending in the acquittal of all defendants, but it had drained the movement's resources and leadership. The failure of non-violent protest to secure fundamental change, coupled with the state's intensifying brutality, led directly to the formation of the ANC's armed wing, UMkhonto weSizwe in 1961, marking the end of what was up to that point predominantly non-violent struggle.

== Sharpeville massacre ==
On 21 March 1960, a group of approximately 5,000 people gathered at the Sharpeville police station, offering themselves up for arrest for not carrying their passbooks. The police were not completely unprepared for the demonstration, as they had already driven smaller groups of more militant activists away the previous night.

The Pan-Africanist Congress (PAC) actively organized to increase turnout to the demonstration, distributing pamphlets and to urge people not to go to work on the day of the protest. Many of the civilians present attended voluntarily to support the protest, but there is evidence that the PAC also used coercive means to draw the crowd there, preventing bus drivers from driving their routes, and cutting of telephone lines into Sharpeville.

By 10:00, a large crowd had gathered, and the atmosphere was initially peaceful and festive. Fewer than 20 police officers were present in the station at the start of the protest. Later the crowd grew to about 20,000, and while some news reports described the mood as "ugly", this was contested by witnesses, including photographer Ian Berry. 130 police officers supported by four Saracen armoured personnel carriers arrived in Sharpeville. The police were armed with firearms, including Sten submachine guns and Lee–Enfield rifles. There was no evidence that anyone in the gathering was armed with anything other than stones.

F-86 Sabre jets and Harvard Trainers approached to within 30 metres (98 ft) of the ground, flying low over the crowd in an attempt to scatter it in a show of force. The protesters responded by hurling stones (striking three policemen) and rushing the police barricades. According to some accounts, police officers attempted to use tear gas to repel these advances, but it proved ineffective, and the police fell back on the use of their batons. However, there is no supporting evidence that the police tried to use tear gas to disperse the crowd, or that they charged the crowd with batons. At about 13:00 the police tried to arrest a protester, and the crowd surged forward. The police began shooting shortly thereafter without issuing a warning to the crowd to disperse.

== Republic established ==
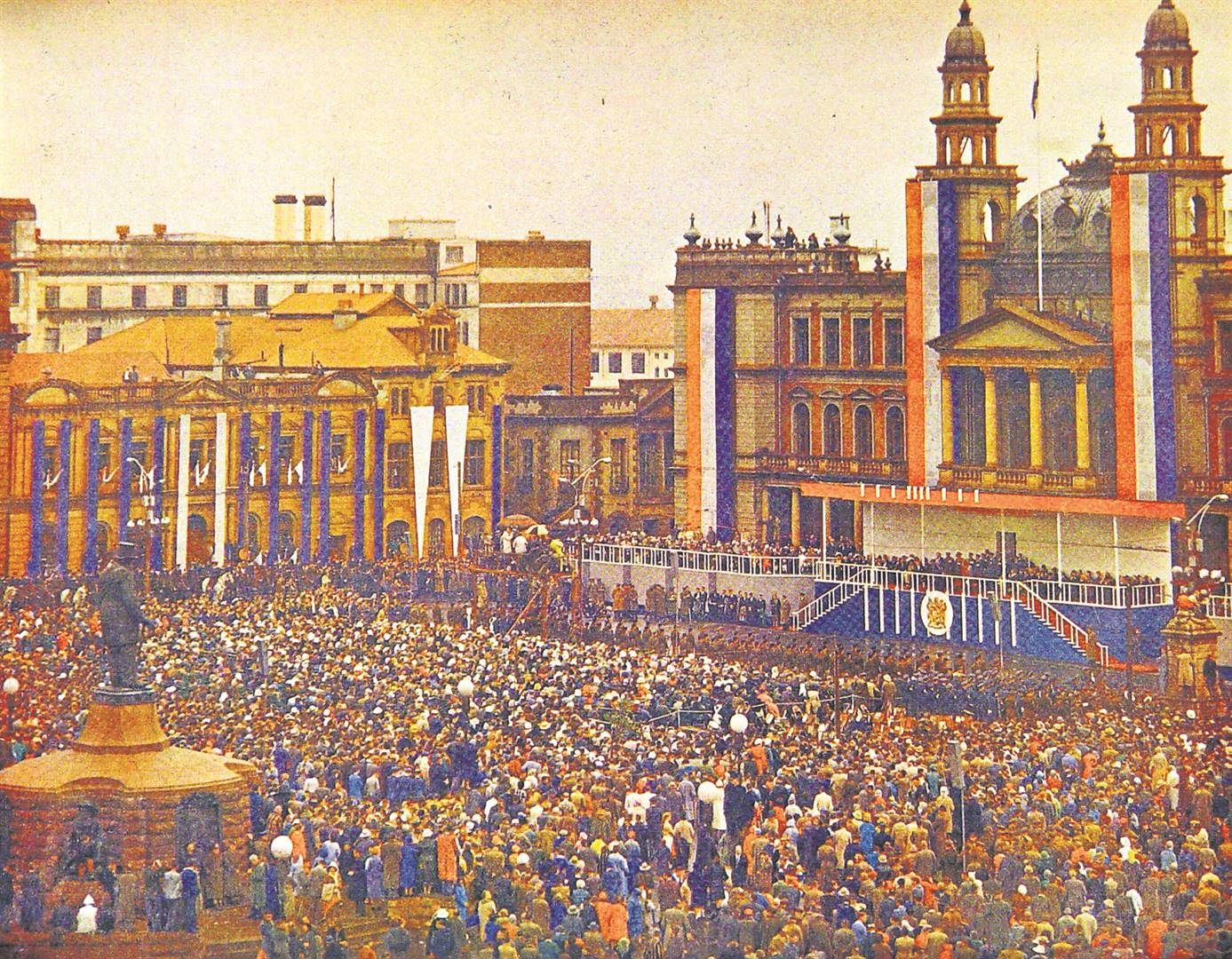
Kerkplein, Pretoria. 31 May 1961.

Despite the National Party's policy of republicanism, it did not campaign for the declaration of a republic during the election, instead favouring remaining in the Commonwealth while reaffirming the electorate of its commitment to a republic. This position was meant to appeal to Afrikaners who otherwise might have voted for the United Party, and it remained relevant throughout the premierships of Daniёl Malan and Johannes Strijdom.

On becoming Prime Minister, Hendrik Verwoerd gave a speech to Parliament in which he declared:

This has indeed been the basis of our struggle all these years: nationalism against imperialism. This has been the struggle since 1910: a republic as opposed to the monarchical connection... We stand unequivocally and clearly for the establishment of the republic in the correct manner and at the appropriate time.

In 1960, Verwoerd announced plans to hold a whites-only referendum on the establishment of a republic, which was held on 5 October the same year. A republic was approved with a narrow majority of 70,000 voters, and it was declared on 31 May 1961 with the adoption of the Constitution Act, 1961.

== Sanctions ==
The apartheid system as an issue was first formally brought to United Nations attention in order to advocate for the Indians residing in South Africa. On 22 June 1946, the Indian government requested that the discriminatory treatment of Indians living in South Africa be included on the agenda of the first General Assembly session. In 1952, apartheid was again discussed in the aftermath of the African National Congress Defiance Campaign, and the UN set up a task team to keep watch on the progress of apartheid and the racial state of affairs in South Africa. Although South Africa's racial policies were a cause for concern, most countries in the UN agreed that this was a domestic affair, which fell outside the UN's jurisdiction.

In April 1960, the UN's conservative stance on apartheid changed following the Sharpeville massacre, and the Security Council for the first time agreed on concerted action against the apartheid regime. Resolution 134 called upon the nation of South Africa to abandon its policies implementing racial discrimination. The newly founded United Nations Special Committee Against Apartheid scripted and passed Resolution 181 on 7 August 1963, calling upon all states to cease the sale and shipment of all ammunition and military vehicles to South Africa. From 1964 onwards, the US and the UK discontinued their arms trade with South Africa. The Security Council also condemned the Soweto massacre in Resolution 392. In 1977, the voluntary UN arms embargo became mandatory with the passing of Resolution 418. In addition to isolating South Africa militarily, the United Nations General Assembly encouraged the boycotting of oil sales to South Africa. Other actions taken by the United Nations General Assembly included the request for all nations and organisations "to suspend cultural, educational, sporting and other exchanges with the racist regime and with organisations or institutions in South Africa which practise apartheid".

After much debate, by the late-1980s, the United States, the United Kingdom, and 23 other nations had passed laws placing various trade sanctions on South Africa. A disinvestment from South Africa movement in many countries was similarly widespread, with individual cities and provinces around the world implementing various laws and local regulations forbidding registered corporations under their jurisdiction from doing business with South African firms, factories, or banks.

== Effect of the Cold War ==
=== "Total Onslaught" ===
Apartheid-era propaganda leaflet issued to South African military personnel in the 1980s. The pamphlet decries "Russian colonialism and oppression" in English, Afrikaans and Portuguese.

During the 1950s, South African military strategy was decisively shaped by fears of communist espionage and a conventional Soviet threat to the strategic Cape trade route between the south Atlantic and Indian Oceans. The apartheid government supported the US-led North Atlantic Treaty Organization (NATO), as well as its policy of regional containment against Soviet-backed regimes and insurgencies worldwide. By the late-1960s, the rise of Soviet client states on the African continent, as well as Soviet aid for militant anti-apartheid movements, was considered one of the primary external threats to the apartheid system. South African officials frequently accused domestic opposition groups of being communist proxies. For its part, the Soviet Union viewed South Africa as a bastion of neocolonialism and a regional Western ally, which helped fuel its support for various anti-apartheid causes.

From 1973 onwards, much of South Africa's white population increasingly looked upon their country as a bastion of the free world besieged militarily, politically, and culturally by Communism and radical black nationalism. The apartheid government perceived itself as being locked in a proxy struggle with the Warsaw Pact and by implication, with armed wings of black nationalist forces such as Umkhonto we Sizwe (MK) and the People's Liberation Army of Namibia (PLAN), which often received arms and training in Warsaw Pact member states. This was described as "Total Onslaught".

=== Militarization of society ===
Soviet support for militant anti-apartheid movements worked in the government's favour, as its claim to be reacting in opposition to aggressive communist expansion gained greater plausibility, and helped it justify its own domestic militarisation methods, known as "Total Strategy". Total Strategy involved building up a formidable conventional military and counter-intelligence capability. It was formulated on counter-revolutionary tactics as espoused by noted French tactician André Beaufre. Considerable effort was devoted towards circumventing international arms sanctions, and the government even went so far as to develop nuclear weapons, allegedly with covert assistance from Israel.

As a result of "Total Strategy", South African society became increasingly militarised. Many domestic civil organisations were modelled upon military structures, and military virtues such as discipline, patriotism and loyalty were highly regarded. General conscription applied, which meant that all able-bodied white males aged eighteen and older were drafted into the armed forces. In 1968, national service for White South African men lasted nine months at minimum, and they could be called up for reserve duty into their late-middle age if necessary. The length of national service was gradually extended to 12 months in 1972 and 24 months in 1978. At state schools, white male students were organised into paramilitary formations and drilled as cadets or as participants in a civil defence or "Youth Preparedness" curriculum. Compulsory military education and in some cases, paramilitary training was introduced for all older white male students at state schools in three South African provinces. These programmes presided over the construction of bomb shelters at schools and drills aimed at simulating mock insurgent raids.

From the late 1970s to the late 1980s, defence budgets in South Africa were raised exponentially. In 1975, Israeli defence minister Shimon Peres signed a security pact with South African defence minister P.W. Botha that led to $200 million in arms deals. In 1988, Israeli arm sales to South Africa totalled over $1.4 billion. Covert operations focused on espionage and domestic counter-subversion became common, the number of special forces units swelled, and the South African Defence Force (SADF) had amassed enough sophisticated conventional weaponry to pose a serious threat to the "front-line states", a regional alliance of neighbouring countries opposed to apartheid.

== Border War ==
The South African Border War was a largely asymmetric conflict that occurred in Namibia (then South West Africa), Zambia, and Angola from 26 August 1966 to 21 March 1990. It was fought between the South African Defence Force (SADF) and the People's Liberation Army of Namibia (PLAN), an armed wing of the South West African People's Organisation (SWAPO), being closely intertwined with the Angolan Civil War.

Following several years of unsuccessful petitioning through the United Nations and the International Court of Justice for Namibian independence from South Africa, SWAPO formed the PLAN in 1962 with material assistance from the Soviet Union, China, and sympathetic African states such as Tanzania, Ghana, and Algeria. Fighting broke out between PLAN and the South African security forces in August 1966. Between 1975 and 1988, the SADF staged massive conventional raids into Angola and Zambia to eliminate PLAN's forward operating bases. It also deployed specialist counter-insurgency units such as Koevoet and 32 Battalion, trained to carry out external reconnaissance and track guerrilla movements.

== Soweto uprising ==
A pivotal turning point in the internal struggle against apartheid was the Soweto uprising. The immediate catalyst was the Afrikaans Medium Decree of 1974, that mandated both Afrikaans and English be used equally as languages of instruction in black secondary schools. This was deeply unpopular, as Afrikaans was widely viewed as the "language of the oppressor."

On June 16, an estimated 20,000 students organized by the South African Students' Movement (SASM) marched peacefully through Soweto in protest. The demonstration was met with a heavy-handed and violent police response.

The uprising sparked weeks of sustained protests and violent clashes that spread from Soweto to other townships across the country. The official death toll for the resulting violence was given as 176, but actual estimates range as high as 700. The event marked a generational shift in the liberation struggle, radicalizing a new cohort of young black South Africans who would join the armed struggle in exile. Internationally, the brutal reports and images from Soweto galvanized global condemnation and led to a significant hardening of anti-apartheid sentiment and sanctions against the South African government.

== Bantustans ==
A central pillar of apartheid policy was the creation of ten Bantustans, or "homelands," territories designated for specific black ethnic groups. Their intended purpose was to deny black South Africans citizenship and political rights in the Republic by making them nominal citizens of these supposedly independent states.

The term "TBVC states" refers to the four Bantustans that were granted nominal "independence" from South Africa: Transkei, Bophuthatswana, Venda and Ciskei.

The South African government made significant investments into these states, presenting them as evidence of the viability of separate development, while in reality, they were largely economically non-viable and politically unstable, relying entirely on Pretoria's financial and military support.

== Constitution of 1983 ==
In a bid to reform apartheid without ending white minority rule, the government under P.W. Botha introduced a new constitution, which was approved in a whites-only referendum in 1983 and came into effect in 1984. This constitution replaced the former British-derived Westminster system with an executive presidency, consolidating significant power in the hands of the State President.

Its most significant change was the creation of a Tricameral Parliament, which aimed to co-opt Coloured and Indian South Africans into a subordinate structure of government. This parliament consisted of three separate, race-based chambers, namely, the House of Assembly (for whites with 178 members), the House of Representatives (for Coloureds with 85 members), and the House of Delegates (for Indians with 45 members).

The system was meticulously engineered to ensure continued white control. Each house only legislated on "its own affairs" (such as education, health, and welfare for their respective racial groups), while "general affairs" concerning the entire nation required the approval of all three houses. However, the House of Assembly, with the largest number of seats and the backing of the powerful executive, always had the ability to override the other two chambers.

Crucially, the constitution completely excluded the black South African majority from any form of national political representation, defining their citizenship as belonging to the homelands instead. This provoked massive internal opposition, leading to the formation of the United Democratic Front (UDF), a broad coalition of hundreds of anti-apartheid groups that mobilized a highly effective boycott and protest campaign against the new system. The first Tricameral elections were largely boycotted by Coloured and Indian voters. The Tricameral Parliament is widely considered to have failed in its objective; instead of dividing opposition, it further unified and galvanized the internal anti-apartheid movement, contributing to the severe political crisis of the mid-1980s.

== State of emergency ==
Faced with a burgeoning mass resistance movement, the Botha government abandoned the pretense of normal law enforcement in favour of open military rule. A limited state of emergency was first declared in July 1985 in 36 magisterial districts, but it was superseded by a nationwide state of emergency in June 1986, which would be renewed annually until 1990.

Under the emergency regulations, the government granted its security forces sweeping powers. These included the authority to detain individuals indefinitely without charge, to impose severe censorship on the media, and to ban any public gathering deemed a threat to public order. The normal rules of due process were effectively suspended.

The period of the state of emergency was marked by extreme political repression. Thousands of activists, including those from the United Democratic Front (UDF) and trade unions, were detained without trial. Security forces engaged in widespread brutality, with torture and extrajudicial killings becoming commonplace. The government's strategy was to decapitate the internal anti-apartheid leadership and cripple its organizational capacity through sheer force.

Despite this, organized resistance continued, often driven underground or into the realm of labour strikes and student protests. The state of emergency succeeded in creating a climate of fear and temporarily suppressed open revolt, but it came at a devastating cost to the regime's international legitimacy and demonstrated that the apartheid state could only maintain control through openly authoritarian means, hastening the eventual need for a negotiated settlement.

== Negotiations to end apartheid ==
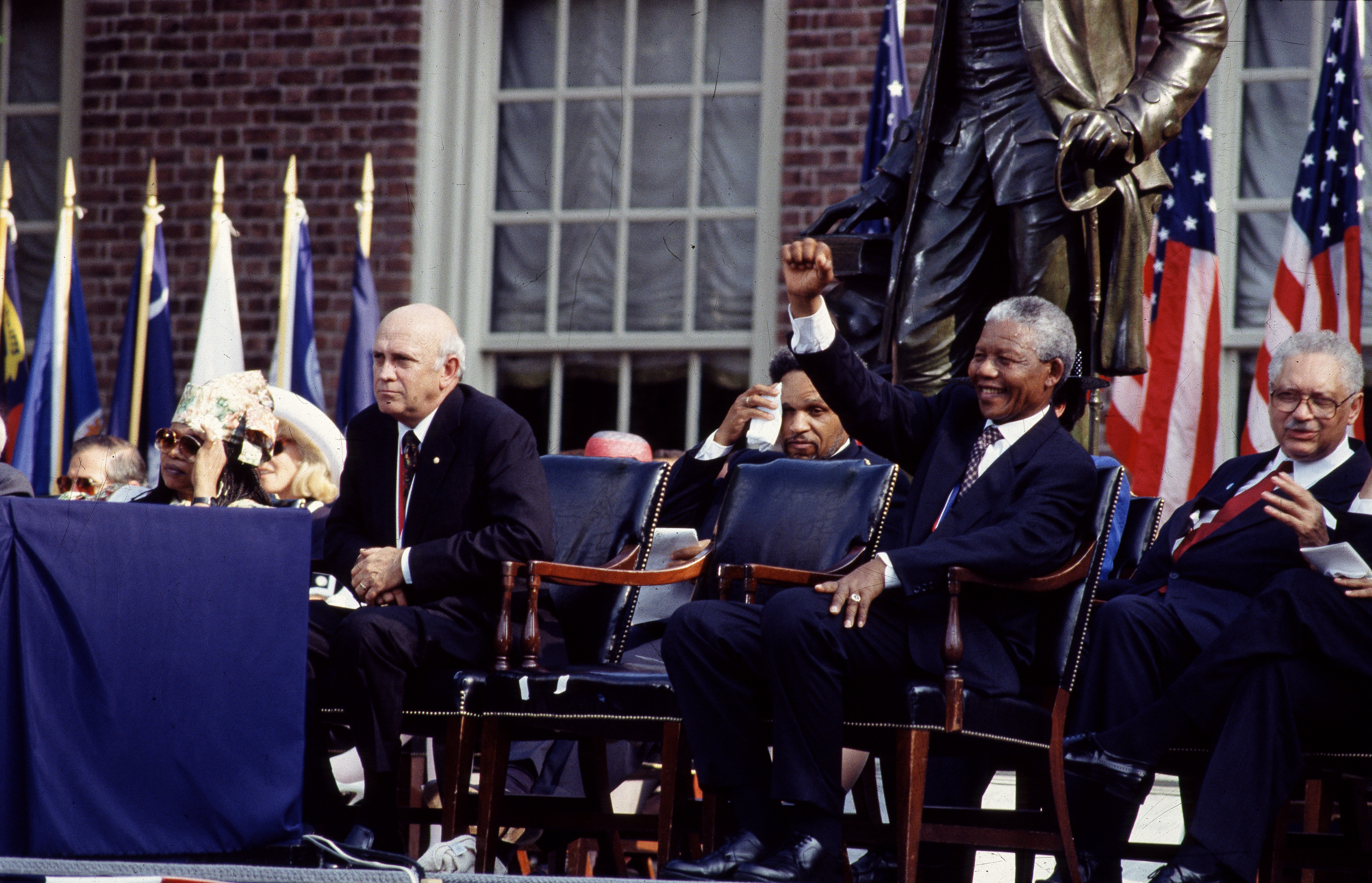
F. W. de Klerk and Nelson Mandela in July 1993, near the close of negotiations, in Philadelphia, Pennsylvania.

By the late 1980s, the South African state was in profound crisis, crippled by international sanctions, a stagnant economy, and widespread resistance. Recognizing the unsustainable nature of the perpetual conflict, the government under P.W. Botha began tentative, secret contact with the imprisoned Nelson Mandela and the exiled African National Congress (ANC) leaders. This process dramatically accelerated under his successor, F.W. de Klerk, who in a landmark speech to Parliament on 2 February 1990, lifted the ban on the ANC, the PAC, the South African Communist Party, and announced the imminent release of Nelson Mandela.

Mandela’s release on 11 February 1990 symbolically opened the door to formal negotiations. The initial period was marked by ongoing political violence, particularly between the ANC and the Inkatha Freedom Party (IFP), which the government was accused of fuelling. The first major forum was the Convention for a Democratic South Africa (CODESA), which began in December 1991, bringing together the government and various liberation movements.

Negotiations were fraught and frequently stalled, nearly collapsing entirely after the Boipatong massacre in 1992 and following the assassination of popular ANC leader Chris Hani by right-wing extremists in 1993. A key breakthrough was achieved when the government and the ANC agreed on a government of national unity following the first democratic elections, effectively securing a transition of power.

The result of these complex and often tense negotiations was an interim constitution, which was formally approved in 1993 and came into effect on 27 April 1994, the day of the general election. This constitution provided the framework for the transition, dismantling the apartheid state and establishing a new, non-racial democracy, culminating in the inauguration of Nelson Mandela as the first black President of South Africa on 10 May 1994.

== 1994 general election ==
The culmination of the negotiation process was South Africa's first universal democratic general election, held from 26 to 29 April 1994. The election was for a new National Assembly and provincial legislatures, which would also serve to elect the President. For the first time in the nation's history, citizens of all races were eligible to vote.

The election was contested by 19 political parties, with the major contenders being the African National Congress (ANC), the National Party (NP), and the Inkatha Freedom Party (IFP). The campaign and voting period were conducted under a shadow of uncertainty and threat of violence, particularly from right-wing white groups and the IFP, which had initially boycotted the process. A last-minute agreement, sealed just days before the election, secured IFP participation.

Despite logistical problems and incidents of violence, the election was declared substantially free and fair by international observers. The results delivered a decisive victory for the ANC, which secured 62.65% of the national vote, just short of the two-thirds majority required to unilaterally draft the final constitution. The National Party won 20.39%, primarily backed by Coloured and white voters, and the Inkatha Freedom Party won 10.54%, dominating the KwaZulu-Natal province.

On 10 May 1994, Nelson Mandela was inaugurated as the first President of South Africa. The election formally ended over three centuries of white minority rule and the 83-year existence of the South African state as it had been constituted since the Union of 1910, marking the definitive birth of the contemporary republic.
