= Kenetswe Mosenogi =

South African politician (born 1982)

Kenetswe Mosenogi MPL

North West MEC for Finance
- Incumbent
- Assumed office 21 June 2024
- Premier: Lazarus Mokgosi
- Preceded by: Motlalepula Rosho

North West MEC for Arts, Culture and Recreation
- In office 22 November 2022 – 14 June 2024
- Premier: Bushy Maape
- Preceded by: Tsotso Tlhapi
- Succeeded by: Collen Maine

North West MEC for Economic Development, Environment, Conservation and Tourism
- In office 28 May 2019 – 22 November 2022
- Premier: Bushy Maape; Job Mokgoro
- Preceded by: Position established
- Succeeded by: Tsotso Tlhapi

Member of the North West Provincial Legislature
- Incumbent
- Assumed office 22 May 2019

Deputy Secretary-General of the African National Congress Youth League
- In office 17 June 2011 – 17 March 2013
- Preceded by: Steven Ngobeni
- Succeeded by: Thandi Moraka

Personal details
- Born: Kenetswe Norah Mosenogi; 24 September 1982 (age 44)
- Party: African National Congress
- Education: North-West University Business School; University of the Witwatersrand
- Profession: Politician

Kenetswe Norah Mosenogi (born 24 September 1982) is a South African politician from the North West. A member of the African National Congress, she has been the Member of the Executive Council (MEC) for Finance since June 2024 and a Member of the North West Provincial Legislature since May 2019. Previously, she had served as the MEC for Economic Development, Environment, Conservation and Tourism from May 2019 to November 2022 and as the MEC for Arts, Culture and Recreation from November 2022 until June 2024. Mosenogi also served as the deputy secretary-general of the African National Congress Youth League from 2011 until 2013.

== Education ==
Mosenogi obtained a master's degree in business administration from the North-West University Business School. She also holds a post-graduate diploma in monitoring and evaluation from the University of the Witwatersrand.

== Career ==
Mosenogi served as both the director of scientific support services and the parliamentary liaison officer in the Department of Sport and Recreation. She also worked as an assistant student administrator at the University of South Africa.

== Political career ==
Mosenogi was a senior member of the African National Congress Youth League. She was first elected to the league's national executive committee in 2008. She was also a councillor and the mayoral committee member for economic development of the Tlokwe Local Municipality, centred around Potchefstroom, until the May 2011 municipal elections. The following month, Mosenogi was elected deputy secretary-general of the ANC youth league. She succeeded Steven Nogbeni and served in the position until the league's leadership structure for that term was disbanded in March 2013. She was the only woman to serve in the league's national leadership for that term. Thandi Moraka was elected as her successor in September 2015.

== Provincial government ==
Prior to the election on 8 May 2019, Mosenogi was placed 12th on the ANC's provincial list of candidates for the North West Provincial Legislature. She took office on 22 May 2019. A few days later, Mosenogi was appointed as the MEC for the newly established Economic Development, Environment, Conservation and Tourism portfolio in the executive council headed by Job Mokgoro. She assumed office on the same day.

On 22 November 2022, Mosenogi was appointed MEC for Arts, Culture and Recreation. She served in the position until June 2024, when she was appointed as the MEC for Finance by the newly elected premier Lazarus Mokgosi.
