= Collen Maine =

South African politician (born 1980)

Collen Maine MPL

Deputy Speaker of the North West Provincial Legislature
- Incumbent
- Assumed office 11 October 2024
- Preceded by: Tshepo Khoza

Member of the North West Executive Council for Arts, Culture, Sports and Recreation
- In office 14 June 2024 – 1 October 2024
- Premier: Lazarus Mokgosi
- Preceded by: Kenetswe Mosenogi
- Succeeded by: Tsotso Tlhapi

Member of the North West Provincial Legislature
- Incumbent
- Assumed office 14 June 2024
- In office June 2013 – November 2015

10th President of the African National Congress Youth League
- In office 4 September 2015 – July 2019
- Deputy: Desmond Moela
- Preceded by: Julius Malema
- Succeeded by: Collen Malatji

Member of the National Assembly
- In office 22 May 2019 – 5 July 2019
- President: Cyril Ramaphosa

Member of the North West Executive Council for Local Government and Human Settlements
- In office May 2014 – November 2015
- Premier: Supra Mahumapelo
- Preceded by: Nono Maloyi (for Human Settlement, Public Safety and Liaison)
- Succeeded by: Wendy Nelson (acting); Fenny Gaolaolwe

Member of the North West Executive Council for Social Development, Women, Children and People with Disabilities
- In office June 2013 – May 2014
- Premier: Thandi Modise
- Preceded by: Mosetsanagape Mokomele-Mothibi
- Succeeded by: Ontlametse Mochware (for Social Development)

Permanent Delegate to the National Council of Provinces

Assembly Member for North West
- In office 7 May 2009 – 25 June 2013

Personal details
- Born: Mokone Collen Maine; 26 September 1980 (age 45)
- Party: African National Congress

Mokone Collen Maine (born 26 September 1980) is a South African politician who has been the Deputy Speaker of the North West Provincial Legislature since October 2024. He was the president of the African National Congress (ANC) Youth League between September 2015 and July 2019.

Before his election to the Youth League presidency, Maine represented the ANC in the National Council of Provinces from 2009 to 2013 and in the North West Provincial Legislature from 2013 to 2015. He was also a Member of the North West Executive Council during the premierships of Thandi Modise and Supra Mahumapelo from 2013 to 2015.

Maine served on the ANC National Executive Committee between December 2017 and December 2019, and he was briefly a Member of the National Assembly in 2019. He returned to the North West Provincial Legislature and provincial government in the May 2024 election. He returned to the Executive Council the following month, now leading the Department of Arts, Culture, Sports and Recreation. In September 2024, he was sacked as an MEC, only to be elected as the deputy speaker of the provincial legislature a month later.

== Early career ==
Maine was born on 26 September 1980. He is from the region that is now the North West province of South Africa.

In Maine's account, he was a member of the Congress of South African Students in his youth, joined the African National Congress (ANC) Youth League (ANCYL) in 1996, and served as a regional organiser for the ANC Youth League in Bophirima in the North West until he became deputy provincial chairperson of the league in the North West in 2008. The Daily Maverick reported that, according to the North West provincial leader of the rival Congress of the People (COPE), Maine was a member of COPE until 2009; Maine denied this.

== Early legislative career: 2009–2015 ==
Pursuant to the 2009 general election, Maine was elected as a North West delegate to the National Council of Provinces, the upper house of the South African Parliament. In June 2013, he was appointed a Member of the Executive Council (MEC) in the provincial government of North West Premier Thandi Modise; his portfolio was social development and women, children and people with disabilities. In order to take up this position in the North West Provincial Legislature, he resigned from the National Council of Provinces on 25 June.

In the next general election in 2014, he was elected to a full term as a Member of the North West Provincial Legislature. He was also appointed MEC for local government and human settlements under newly elected Premier Supra Mahumapelo. In addition, during this period he disclosed financial interests in several companies.

== President of the ANC Youth League: 2015–2019 ==
=== Election ===
By 2015, Maine was the provincial chairperson of the ANC Youth League in the North West, which supported his candidacy for the national presidency of the league. On 4 September 2015, at the league's 25th national elective conference in Midrand, he was elected unopposed as national president of the ANC Youth League, with Desmond Moela as his deputy. Pule Mabe, Ronald Lamola, and Lesego Makhubela were all viewed as Maine's competitors, but none made it to the final ballot; declining a nomination to stand for the deputy presidency, Lamola said that the electoral process was "a farce". Maine's candidacy was reportedly supported by the so-called Premier League, comprising the Premiers and ANC provincial chairpersons of the North West (Mahumapelo), Free State (Ace Magashule), and Mpumalanga (David Mabuza). Mahumpelo had reportedly supported Maine's rise through the North West Youth League in earlier years.

Maine's age attracted media interest, given the Youth League's rule that only persons under 35 were eligible for membership and leadership positions: he insisted that he was "34.5" at the time of the conference. His MEC position also attracted interest, since the Youth League presidency is typically a full-time job based out of Luthuli House, the ANC's headquarters in Johannesburg. After his election, Maine initially signalled his willingness to resign from the North West government, but in October he reversed his position; the league's newly elected provincial secretary, Njabulo Nzuza, said the Youth League's national executive committee had decided that the presidency would no longer be a full-time position and that Maine could hold retain his MEC post simultaneously. In early November 2015, however, Maine resigned from the Executive Council and was replaced by Wendy Nelson in an acting capacity; he did not publicly explain his reasons for resigning.

=== Support for Zuma and Dlamini-Zuma ===
While Maine was Youth League president, he and the league under him became outspoken supporters of incumbent ANC president Jacob Zuma, then serving his second term as President of South Africa. For example, amid the Public Protector's investigation into allegations of state capture by Zuma's associates, Maine attended a "Hands Off Zuma" rally in Durban, where he urged veterans of the ANC's apartheid-era armed wing, Umkhonto we Sizwe, to "bring your guns. Now is the time to defend the revolution". Maine also publicly supported some of Zuma's left-wing populist policy proposals, particularly free higher education and an assault on so-called "white monopoly capital". Ahead of the ANC's 54th National Conference, which would elect Zuma's successor as ANC president, the Youth League endorsed Zuma's favoured candidate, Nkosazana Dlamina-Zuma. Maine personally was a strong supporter of Dlamini-Zuma.

At the conference in December 2017, Dlamini-Zuma was beaten by Cyril Ramaphosa, who became national president in February 2018. Maine subsequently appeared to temper his pro-Zuma activism; he publicly pledged the league's loyalty to Ramaphosa as ANC president. In April 2018, the deputy secretary of the ANC Youth League, Thandi Moraka, told a gathering that Maine had approached Ramaphosa after the 54th National Conference to "apologise" on behalf of the Youth League for supporting Dlamini-Zuma. Moraka said of Maine that "he doesn't deserve to be called a comrade, because he is a sellout of note" and called for him to resign from the league.

=== National Assembly ===
As president of the Youth League, Maine automatically became an ex officio member of the ANC National Executive Committee, the party's top decision-making body; at the 54th National Conference in December 2017, he was directly elected onto the committee for a five-year term, receiving the votes of 1,572 of the 4,283 delegates who submitted ballot papers. In the 2019 general election, in which the ANC renewed its majority, he was included on the party's electoral list and was elected to a seat in the National Assembly, the lower house of the national Parliament. He was sworn in on 22 May 2019 and became a member of the portfolio committee on public service and administration; despite speculation to the contrary, he was not appointed to Ramaphosa's cabinet.

On 5 July 2019, Maine announced that he would resign from his seat in the National Assembly due to "private matters". News24 reported that his resignation was effective immediately.

=== Succession ===
The ANC Youth League failed to hold its elective conference in September 2018 as planned. In 2019, some members within the league, led especially by a group calling itself the Revive ANCYL Movement, began calling for the election of a new leadership corps, including by protesting outside an ANC National Executive Committee meeting and threatening a lawsuit. They argued both that many of the league's incumbent leaders were over the age of 35 and therefore ineligible to represent the ANC's youth and that they had overstayed their term (three years in terms of the league constitution).

In late July 2019, just weeks after Maine's resignation from Parliament, the ANC National Executive Committee disbanded the national executive of the Youth League, ending the terms of Maine and other league officials. Maine was nonetheless among the several former ANC Youth League presidents who were appointed as members of the interim task team that was installed to lead the League until it could hold fresh leadership elections.

== Return to the North West government: 2024–present ==
Maine was elected to the North West Provincial Legislature in the 2024 provincial election. Shortly afterwards, he was appointed MEC for Arts, Culture, Sports and Recreation. On 18 September 2024, he was removed as an MEC after the National Executive Committee of the African National Congress instructed North West premier Lazzy Mokgosi to appoint more women to his executive council. He was succeeded by former MEC Tsotso Tlhapi. Maine was, however, elected as the deputy speaker of the North West provincial legislature on 11 October 2024, succeeding Tshepo Khoza, who had resigned following allegations that he forged his matric certificate.

== Controversies ==
=== Relationship to the Gupta family ===
Maine's defence of Zuma occasionally extended to a defence of Zuma's associates in the controversial Gupta family, who were alleged to be involved in state capture under Zuma's administration. In February 2016, for example, Maine was quoted as saying "an attack on the Guptas is an attack on the ANC". In May 2016, amaBhungane reported that there was evidence to "suggest" that Maine "received a generous helping hand from the Gupta family" through a loan which helped he and his wife to purchase a R5.4 million house on a golf estate outside Pretoria. They had bought the house in October 2015, weeks after Maine's election as ANC Youth League president. Dismissing allegations that he had personal ties to the Guptas, Maine said, "If engaging stakeholders is being captured, then I am captured... but mainly I am captured by the responsibility I was given by the ANCYL". He also clarified that in his defence of the Guptas, "I was dealing with those issues as a matter of principle, not that I have anything to do with them". In June 2017, amaBhungane further reported that the so-called Gupta Leaks suggested that Maine and other Youth League leaders had been assisted by Bell Pottinger, a public relations firm retained by a Gupta-owned company, in devising public remarks.

In April 2018, during a speech at a memorial service for ANC stalwart Winnie Madikizela-Mandela, Maine admitted that he had met the Guptas at their home. He said that he had not intended to go but had been "taken there", and that he had been taken not by Zuma but by Supra Mahumapelo. At the time Mahumapelo was confronting fierce opposition, in which Maine was thought to be involved, to his leadership of the North West. In connection with Maine's allegation, Mahumapelo said, "Reckless drivers who cause accidents on the roads must never blame the driving school for introducing them to driving". News24 described Maine's remarks as his "Damascus moment, turning against a man [Mahumapelo] who had long been seen as his political mentor".

=== Zondo Commission ===
Investigating allegations of state capture under Zuma's administration, the Zondo Commission found that Zuma supporters within the State Security Agency had set up a VIP protection unit in the agency's Special Operations division, technically usurping a function of the South African Police Service. The protection unit offered special protection to Zuma and various associates, including Maine.

== Personal life ==
He is married to Kelebogile Maine and as of 2015 had three children.
