= Anton Lembede =

Founding president of the African National Congress Youth League

Anton Muziwakhe Lembede
- Born: 21 March 1914; Eston in KwaZulu Natal
- Died: 30 July 1947 (aged 33); Johannesburg
- Occupation: Lawyer
- Known for: First president of the African National Congress Youth League

Anton Muziwakhe Lembede OLG (21 March 1914 – 30 July 1947) was a South African activist and founding president of the African National Congress Youth League (ANCYL). He has been described as "the principal architect of South Africa's first full-fledged ideology of African nationalism." Lembede had a strong influence on Nelson Mandela, Walter Sisulu and Oliver Tambo. Lembede was regarded as the progenitor of the "Programme of Action" that was adopted as a guiding document by the 1949 meeting of the African National Congress. He died in 1947, aged 33.

== Early life ==
Anton Muziwakhe Lembede was born on 21 January 1914 on the farm of Frank Fell in Eston near Pietermaritzburg, KwaZulu Natal, South Africa. Anton was the eldest of seven children born to Mbazwana Martin and Martha Nora MaLuthuli Lembede. His father Mbazwana Martin was a farm labourer and his mother was a teacher. Anton was home-schooled by his mother, who taught him to read and write until grade four level. He was given the name "Anton" by a priest at Eston. It was only when Anton turned 13 that he started his formal education at the Catholic Inkanyezi School.

== Education ==
In 1933, Lembede enrolled at Adams College, which at the time, was one of the more prestigious "native" schools. The school saw students coming from central Africa to enrol. Lembede enrolled for the "Native Teachers Higher Primary Certificate". As a student he was noted for dedication, his brilliance with languages and his family's obvious poverty. The latter resulted in him being avoided by other students. Lembede's views at the time were more practical than political and he wrote about the need for education and self-reliance. This reflects the traditional view of his school that had been created by John Dube after hearing the ideas of the American Booker Washington.

In 1936 after graduation by Adams College, he not only took up teaching posts but he also pursued a Bachelor of Arts degree in his spare time. Lembede majored in Philosophy and Roman Law. Lembede then enrolled at the University of South Africa for a law degree and completed it in 1942. Lembede finally registered for a Master of Arts Degree in Philosophy in 1943. His 1945 thesis was entitled "The Conception of God as Expounded by, or as it Emerges from the Writings of Philosophers- from Descartes to the Present Day".

== Career ==
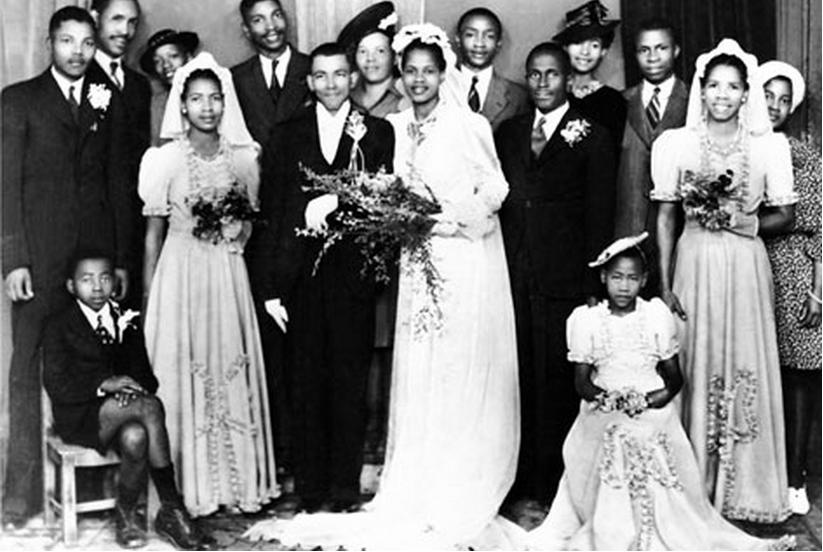
Walter and Albertina Sisulu's wedding. Evelyn Mase is to the left of the groom and Lembede is to the right of the bride. Nelson Mandela is far left. Rosabella Sisulu looks out over the couple.

Lembede moved to Johannesburg after finishing his L.L.B and completed his articles at Pixley ka Isaka Seme's law firm. Seme had first proposed the idea of the ANC and he had been an unimpressive president of the organisation. Seme no longer enjoyed the success of his early career and he looked to Lembede to take over his firm when he retired. Seme briefly practised law for a while. During this time he regularly met with Walter Sisulu, Nelson Mandela and Oliver Tambo (who went on to establish their black South African law firm), discussing how they must win their freedom. In 1944 he attended the wedding of Walter and Albertina Sisulu. Also present was Nelson Mandela and Evelyn Mase.

Lembede lived in Orlando in Johannesburg with his intellectual partner A.P. Mda, whom he had met when they were both aspiring teachers. He and Mda would spend their free time holding debating games which stood them in both stead. Lembede read widely and he would quote fascist leaders until Mda pointed out the racist policies that they espoused.

== ANCYL ==
Lembede was the principal thinker behind launching the African National Congress Youth League. So in 1943 he led Nelson Mandela, Oliver Tambo, Walter Sisulu, Jordan Ngubane, Ellen Kuzwayo, Albertina Sisulu, Lembede's friend A.P. Mda, Dan Tloome, and David Bopape to become the first elected general president of the ANC Youth League on 10 September 1944. The league wanted to reform the ANC, which they described as "a body of gentlemen with clean hands".

Lembede spent a lot of his time creating the organisation's Manifesto whilst also being elected to be the ANC's secretary in the Transvaal. The following year Lembede, Tambo and Sisulu went on the attack to defend their ideas of African nationalism and they almost succeeded in getting the communists thrown out of the congress in the Transvaal. Possibly as a result both the ANC's National Executive seconded him to help them.

Lembede died suddenly in 1947. His cause of death was not announced but his family later said it was cardiac failure associated with a blocked intestine. He had intestinal problems during the 1940s and he had abdominal surgery in both 1940 and 1941. Lembede had a funeral with many notable attendees. Mda took over the presidency on a temporary basis after Lembede died, but he was elected to the position in time.

== Legacy ==
After the publication of Lembede's collected works, one reviewer commented that the South African activist's "ideas achieved canonical status in 1978 with the publication of Gail Gerhart's Black Power in South Africa […] which accorded recognition to Lembede as a pioneering figure in an intellectual lineage that was later embodied in Robert Sobukwe and Steve Biko." Be that as it may,

his arguments are neither attractive nor persuasive nor original. As his editors concede, much of his thought was influenced by the biological determinism that was such a staple ingredient in the scientific racism that accompanied totalitarian nationalism. If his ideas embodied his primary legacy, what is one to make of his flirtation with fascism?

Lembede's legacy is probably the "Youth League manifesto" policy document that he, Mda, and Ngubane worked on for the Youth League. This document challenged the ANC to be more active and to set aside gentle debate. This document was to go on to be a leading policy of the ANC. The document recognized that race was an issue and that Africans needed to seize their inheritance. Lembede was inflexible and rejected the idea of welcoming sympathetic white supporters. He realised that the collaboration and cooperation with the patronising white leaders had only resulted in further discriminatory treatment. The gentle approach of ANC leaders such as AP Xuma was not going to establish a major change in their lifetime. Lembede wanted African Nationalism. He had realized that history had been distorted by the "white leaders" and that you did not need to be white to lead. Lembede said "under the banner of Congress, African youth will triumphantly march to freedom – freedom within our lifetime".

Nelson Mandela wrote, "One night in 1943 I met Anton Lembede, who held master of arts and bachelor of law degrees, and A.P. Mda. From the moment I heard Lembede speak, I knew I was seeing a magnetic personality who thought in original and often startling ways." Mda said Lembede gave a "clear and pointed expression to the vaguely felt ideas of the age." Mandela later wrote that "Lembede's views struck a chord in me. […] I came to see the antidote as militant African nationalism."

In 1947 after Lembede's death the "Programme of Action" was agreed by the ANC under its new more militant president. Lembede was regarded as the architect of this important document. Mda arranged for the document to be adopted with only small changes by the next conference in Port Elizabeth and Oliver Tambo arranged that the new president of the ANC, who would guide the 1949 ANC conference, would adopt the Programme of Action as their guiding document.

In 2002 his bones were removed from Johannesburg and flown to Durban where they were reburied on 27 October 2002 at Madundube in Umbumbulu, Durban.

== Work ==
- Edgar, Robert R.; Msumza, Luyanda Ka, eds. (1996). Freedom in Our Lifetime: The Collected Writings of Anton Muziwakhe Lembede. Athens, OH: Ohio University Press. ISBN 978-0-821-41149-0.
