= Zama Khanyase =

South African politician

Zama Khanyase MP

Member of the National Assembly of South Africa
- Incumbent
- Assumed office 25 February 2026
- Preceded by: Tsakani Shiviti

Personal details
- Other political affiliations: African National Congress

Zamakhanyase "Zama" Khanyase is a South African politician who is a Member of Parliament (MP) for the African National Congress. She replaced Tsakani Shiviti in 2026.

== See also ==
- List of National Assembly members of the 28th Parliament of South Africa
