= Jopie Fourie =

Boer soldier and rebel (1879–1914)

Josef Johannes Fourie
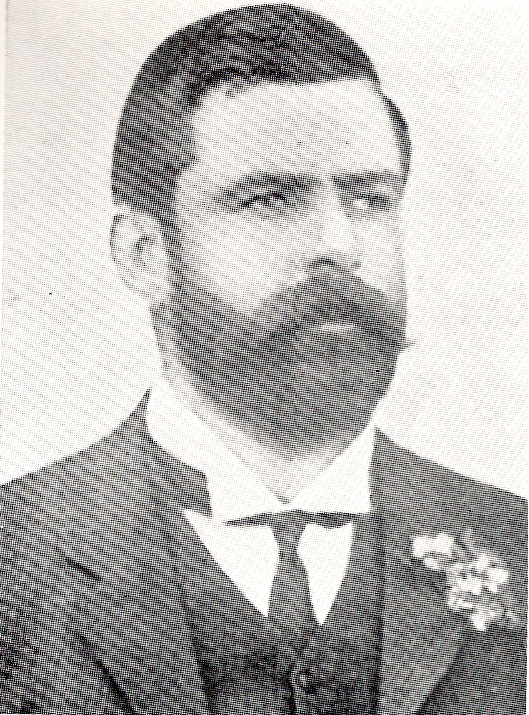
- Born: August 27, 1879; Wildebeesthoek, Pretoria District, South African Republic
- Died: 20 December 1914 (aged 35); Pretoria Central Prison, Pretoria, Union of South Africa
- Cause of death: Execution by firing squad
- Occupation(s): Scout, dispatch rider
- Spouse: Susanna Elizabeth Carolina Engelmohr (m. 1903)

Signature
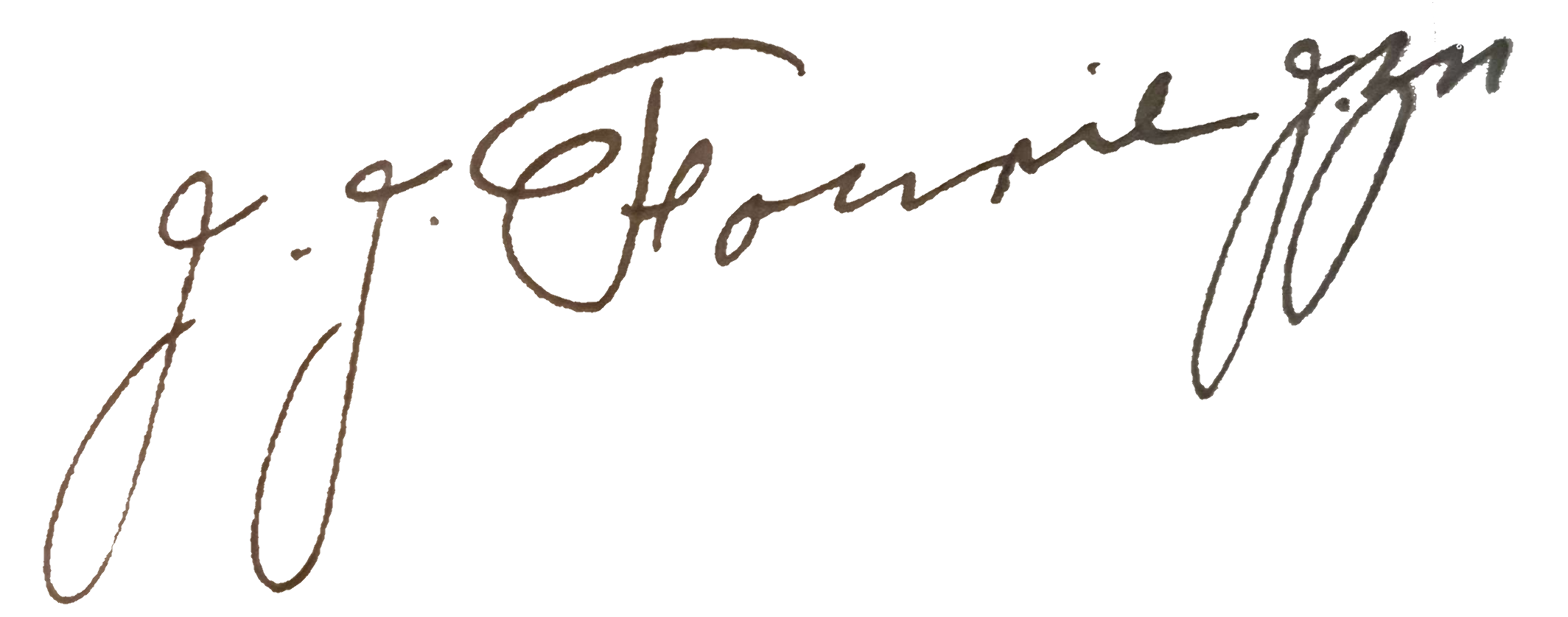

Josef Johannes "Jopie" Fourie (27 August 1879 – 20 December 1914) was a Boer soldier. A scout and dispatch rider during the Second Boer War, he later took part in the Maritz Rebellion of 1914–1915 against General Louis Botha, the prime minister of South Africa. For his involvement, he was found guilty of treason and executed by firing squad.

== Early life ==
Fourie was educated at Grey College, Bloemfontein and Victoria College (now Paul Roos Gymnasium), Stellenbosch. As a schoolboy, he served under Piet Roos during the Jameson Raid. During the Second Boer War, which began in 1899, he was a scout and dispatch rider and was wounded and captured north of Pretoria during that war.

By 1914, Fourie had been commissioned into the Active Citizens Force (ACF) as an officer of the Union Defence Force.

== Rebellion ==
By the beginning of 1914, the high economic expectations of the unification of South Africa had been dashed. Three to four years of drought had devastated farms in parts of the Orange Free State. The government suppression of the 1913 and 1914 strikes on the Witwatersrand alienated Afrikaner workers. This created a fertile ground for rebellion. The trigger for the rebellion was Britain's declaration of war in 1914, which also put South Africa in a state of war. As a result of this, His Majesty's Government asked the South African cabinet to invade the German colony of South West Africa.

The 1914 Revolt occurred because believers in republicanism rose up against the pro-British government of the Union of South Africa, as they did not wish to fight for the British Empire against the German Empire. Many Afrikaners had German ancestors, were veterans of the Boer Commandos, or eyewitnesses to systematic British war crimes during the Second Boer War.

Without first resigning his British commission, Fourie led a Commando which inflicted 40 per cent of the casualties of Government security forces. His commando also fired on its opponents during a brief truce. In one instance, Fourie's men shot and killed a soldier, William Allan King, who was tending to a wounded man. Ironically, Fourie and King, a well-liked native administrator in Transvaal, were noted to have been good friends before the rebellion. Fourie and his brother Hannes were captured at Nooitgedacht in the district of Rustenburg on 16 December 1914.

== Court-martial and execution ==
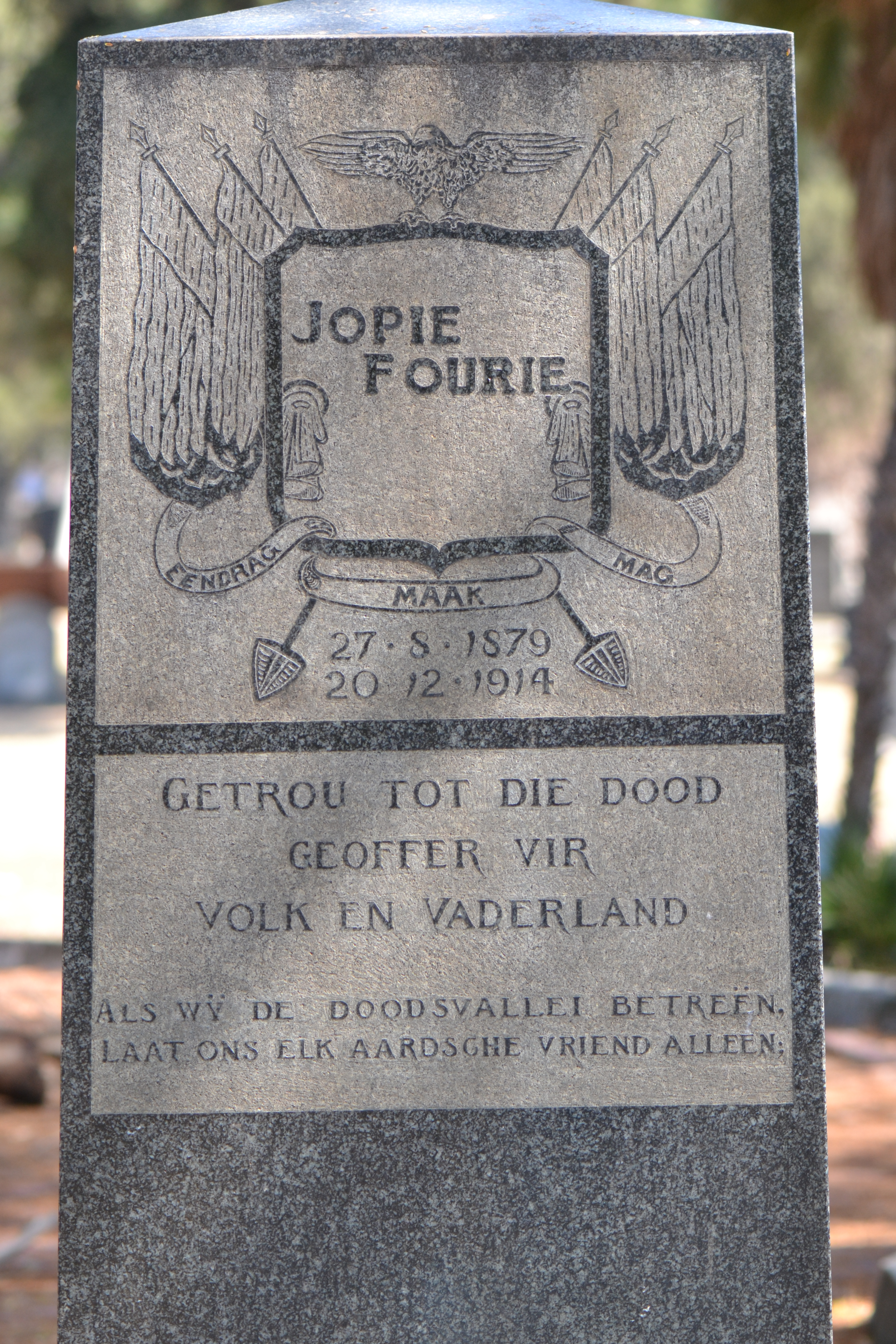
Grave of Jopie Fourie in the Church Street Cemetery, Pretoria

After the rebellion was put down by Louis Botha and Jan Smuts, the ringleaders received fines and terms of imprisonment.

The only death sentence imposed was upon Jopie Fourie, who was court-martialed instead of being tried by a civilian court. An Afrikaner delegation that included future prime minister D. F. Malan unsuccessfully petitioned Minister of Defence, Gen. Smuts, to grant leniency. Fourie was executed without a blindfold by firing squad in the courtyard of Pretoria Central Prison on 20 December 1914. In a letter written hours before his execution, Fourie wrote, "The tree which has been planted and which is wetted with my blood will grow large and bear delightful fruit."

== Legacy ==
The execution of Fourie was a divisive event in white politics. To Afrikaner believers in republicanism, Fourie was a martyr and Jan Smuts was a traitor. Fourie's court-martial and execution caused massive outrage and was a potent factor in the rise of the National Party. Fourie was one of the martyrs and legends of the Maritz Rebellion which would inspire Afrikaner nationalism long afterwards. The Jopie Fourie Primary School in Pretoria is named after him.
