= Hoffman Galeng =

South African politician

Member of the North West Executive Council for Social Development
- In office 8 August 2017 – 6 December 2018
- Premier: Supra Mahumapelo; Job Mokgoro
- Preceded by: Kgakgamatso Nkewu
- Succeeded by: Fenny Gaolaolwe

Personal details
- Citizenship: South Africa
- Party: African National Congress

Goatlhotsemang Hoffman Galeng is a South African politician who represented the African National Congress (ANC) in the North West Provincial Legislature until 2019. He served as the North West's Member of the Executive Council (MEC) for Social Development from November 2017 to December 2018.

== Anti-apartheid activism ==
During apartheid, Galeng was chairperson of the Northern Cape branch of the United Democratic Front and president of the Huhudi Civic Association. He later testified to the Truth and Reconciliation Commission about petrol-bomb and other attacks on his home by A-Team vigilantes, as well as about torture he experienced while in police detention in 1986 to 1987. After the end of apartheid in 1994, he served as Mayor of Vryburg.

== Legislative career ==
Galeng has represented the ANC in the North West Provincial Legislature since 2009 or earlier: he was elected to a seat in the 2009 general election, ranked seventh on the ANC's provincial party list. He was re-elected in the 2014 general election, ranked 18th, and was appointed as Majority Chief Whip in the legislature. In 2015, there was a minor scandal when City Press reported about fuel, groceries, and takeaway food bought by Galeng in a "spending spree" on the ANC's corporate credit card.

On 8 August 2017, Galeng was appointed to the North West Executive Council by Premier Supra Mahumapelo, who appointed him to succeed Kgakgamatso Nkewu as Member of the Executive Council (MEC) for Social Development; Raymond Elisha succeeded him as Chief Whip. He was retained in that portfolio by Mahumapelo's successor, Job Mokgoro, who took office in June 2018. In October 2018, the Sunday Times reported that Galeng's department was spending R50,000 per month to station two security guards at his home in Vryburg, even though his primary residence was in Mahikeng. The opposition Economic Freedom Fighters called for Galeng's dismissal and he was summoned for questioning before the provincial legislature's Standing Committee on Public Accounts.

Two months later, on 6 December 2018, Mokgoro announced that he had fired Galeng and replaced him with Fenny Gaolaolwe. Galeng did not stand for re-election in the 2019 general election.
