= Boitumelo Moiloa =

South African politician

North West MEC for Social Development
- In office 28 May 2019 – 11 July 2023
- Premier: Bushy Maape; Job Mokgoro
- Preceded by: Fenny Gaolaolwe
- Succeeded by: Lazarus Mokgosi

Member of the North West Provincial Legislature
- In office 13 August 2013 – 28 May 2024

Personal details
- Party: African National Congress; South African Communist Party
- Occupation: Member of the Executive Council
- Profession: Politician

Boitumelo Theodora Moiloa is a South African politician from the North West who served as the MEC (Member of the Executive Council) for Social Development from May 2019 until May 2024. She was sworn in as a Member of the North West Provincial Legislature in August 2013. Moiloa is a member of both the African National Congress and the South African Communist Party.

== Political career ==
Moiloa started her political activism during her school years in the 1980s and 1990s. She was an activist for the African National Congress. She later joined the South African Communist Party and served as the party's treasurer in the Dr Ruth Mompatsi region. Moiloa also served on the ANC's regional executive. She was elected to the ANC's provincial executive committee in 2011.

Moiloa was sworn in as a member of the North West Provincial Legislature on 13 August 2013, succeeding Veronica Kekesi. She was elected to a full term in the 2014 provincial election. In April 2018, Moiloa spoke out against premier Supra Mahumapelo and called on him to resign. After her re-election in the provincial election held on 8 May 2019, premier Job Mokgoro appointed her Member of the Executive Council for Social Development on 28 May 2019. She was sworn in on the same day and took over from Fenny Gaolaolwe.

On 31 May 2023, Moiloa and the Social Development Head of Department Relebohile Mofokane were suspended and placed on a month long leave due to infighting in the department. Moiloa was sacked as Social Development MEC on 11 July 2023.
