= Phumzile Mgcina =

South African politician (born 1990)

The Honourable Phumzile Mgcina MP

Deputy Minister of Mineral and Petroleum Resources
- Incumbent
- Assumed office 3 July 2024 Serving with Jomo Sibiya
- President: Cyril Ramaphosa
- Minister: Nomakhosazana Meth

Member of the National Assembly
- Incumbent
- Assumed office 14 June 2024

Deputy President of the African National Congress Youth League
- Incumbent
- Assumed office 1 July 2023
- President: Collen Malatji
- Preceded by: Desmond Moela

Personal details
- Born: 8 August 1990 (age 35) Utrecht, Natal Province; South Africa
- Party: African National Congress

Phumzile Sinclatia Mgcina (born 8 August 1990) is a South African politician who is currently serving as Deputy Minister of Mineral and Petroleum Resources since July 2024. She has been the deputy president of the African National Congress Youth League since July 2023.

Mgcina is from Utrecht, KwaZulu-Natal and began her career as a local councillor in Amajuba District Municipality. She was elected to the National Assembly of South Africa in the May 2024 general election.

== Early life ==
Born 8 August 1990, Mgcina is from Utrecht, a small town outside Newcastle in KwaZulu-Natal. She later said that her interest in politics stemmed from her recognition that the end of apartheid had not improved service delivery in Utrecht. As a 16 year old she became politically active in the Youth League of the African National Congress (ANC).

== Early political career ==
Mgcina entered frontline politics as a local councillor in the Amajuba District Municipality, which governs her hometown. Representing the ANC, she was elected as speaker of the council in the late 2010s; the Sunday Tribune said that she was the youngest council speaker in the country. She later served as a member of the mayor's executive committee in the municipal government.

She was also active in the ANC's regional branch in Newcastle, known as the Emalahleni or Mbuso Kubheka branch. In May 2018 she was elected as ANC deputy regional secretary, and in September 2021 she was elected to succeed Phumzile Mbatha-Cele as deputy regional chairperson, deputising Newcastle mayor Ntuthuko Mahlaba.

In 2023, Mgcina launched a campaign for election as deputy president of the ANC Youth League, which was due to hold its first national elective conference since 2015. She ran on a slate of candidates aligned to presidential candidate Collen Malatji. Mgcina was the only deputy presidential candidate to receive sufficient nominations to earn a place on the ballot paper, and she was elected as league deputy president when the conference was held in Johannesburg on 1 July 2023. She was the first woman to hold the office.

== National government: 2024–present ==
Ahead of the May 2024 general election, Mgcina stood as an ANC candidate, ranked 23rd on the party's national list. She was elected to a seat in the National Assembly, and on 30 June President Ramaphosa announced her appointment as Deputy Minister of Employment and Labour. In that capacity she deputises Minister Nomakhosazana Meth and serves alongside Deputy Minister Jomo Sibiya. Her appointment followed an overt campaign by the ANC Youth League, calling for her elevation to the cabinet in service of youth representation. She was sworn in to office on 3 July 2024.
