= Tshepo Khoza =

South African politician

Deputy Speaker of the North West Provincial Legislature
- In office 14 June 2024 – 25 August 2024
- Preceded by: Lenah Miga
- Succeeded by: Collen Maine

Member of the North West Provincial Legislature
- In office 14 June 2024 – 8 October 2024

Personal details
- Party: African National Congress
- Profession: Politician

Tshepo George Khoza is a South African politician who served as the Deputy Speaker of the North West Provincial Legislature from June until August 2024, when he resigned over allegations that he forged his matric certificate. A member of the African National Congress, he was a councillor in the Matlosana Local Municipality where he served as the member of the mayoral committee (MMC) responsible for public safety before being elected to the provincial legislature.
