= History of South Africa (1910–1948) =

This is the history of South Africa from 1910 to 1948.

== World War I ==
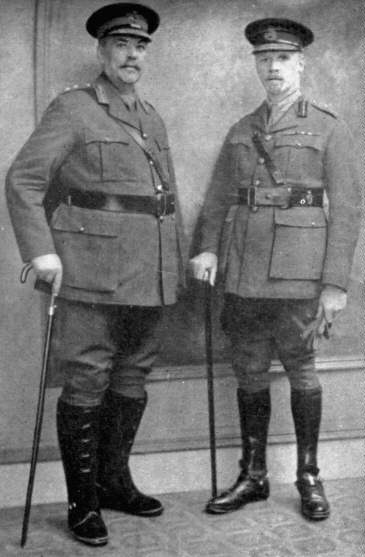
During the First World War, Smuts (right) and Botha were key members of the British Imperial War Cabinet.

The Union of South Africa was tied closely to the British Empire, and automatically joined with Great Britain and the allies against the German Empire. Both Prime Minister Louis Botha and Defence Minister Jan Smuts were former Second Boer War generals who had fought against the British, but then became active and respected members of the Imperial War Cabinet.

South Africa was part of significant military operations against Germany. In spite of Boer resistance at home, the Afrikaner-led government of Louis Botha unhesitatingly joined the side of the Allies of World War I and fought alongside its armies. The South African Government agreed to the withdrawal of British Army units so that they were free to join the European war, and had plans to invade German South-West Africa. Elements of the South African army refused to fight against the Germans and along with other opponents of the Government rose in open revolt. The government declared martial law on 14 October 1914, and forces loyal to the government under the command of General Louis Botha and Jan Smuts proceeded to destroy the Maritz Rebellion. The leading Boer rebels got off lightly with terms of imprisonment of six and seven years and heavy fines. (See World War I and the Maritz Rebellion.)

=== Military action against Germany during World War I ===
The South African Union Defence Force saw action in a number of areas:

1. It dispatched its army to German South-West Africa (later known as South West Africa and now known as Namibia). The South Africans expelled German forces and gained control of the former German colony. (See South-West Africa Campaign.)
2. A military expedition under General Jan Smuts was dispatched to German East Africa (later known as Tanganyika and now the mainland part of Tanzania). The objective was to fight German forces in that colony and to try to capture the elusive German General von Lettow-Vorbeck. Ultimately, Lettow-Vorbeck fought his tiny force out of German East Africa into Mozambique and then Northern Rhodesia, where he accepted a cease-fire three days after the end of the war. (See East African Campaign (World War I).)
3. 1st South African Brigade troops were shipped to France to fight on the Western Front. The most costly battle that the South African forces on the Western Front fought in was the Battle of Delville Wood in 1916. (See South African Army in World War I.)
4. South Africans also saw action with the Cape Corps as part of the Egyptian Expeditionary Force in Palestine. (See Cape Corps 1915 - 1991)

=== Military contributions and casualties in World War I ===
With a population of roughly 6 million, between 1914–1918, over 250,000 South Africans of all races voluntarily served their country. Thousands more served in the British Army directly, with over 3,000 joining the British Royal Flying Corps and over 100 volunteering for the Royal Navy. It is likely that around 50% of white men of military age served during the war. More than 146,000 whites, 83,000 black Africans and 2,500 Coloureds and Asians served in either German South-West Africa, East Africa, the Middle East, or on the Western Front in Europe. Suffering roughly 19,000 casualties, over 7,000 South Africans were killed, and nearly 12,000 were wounded during the course of the war. Eight South Africans won the Victoria Cross for gallantry, the Empire's highest and prestigious military medal. The Battle of Delville Wood and the sinking of the SS Mendi being the greatest single incidents of loss of life.

The assistance that South Africa gave the British Empire was significant. Two German African colonies were occupied, either by South Africa alone or with significant South African assistance. Manpower, from all races, helped Allied operations not just on the Western Front and Africa but also in the Middle East against the Ottoman Empire. South Africa's ports and harbours on the Home Front were a crucial strategic asset when conducting a war on a global scale. Providing important rest and refuelling stations, the Royal Navy could ensure vital sea lane connections to the British Raj, and the Far East stayed open.

Economically, South Africa supplied two-thirds of gold production in the British Empire, with most of the remainder coming from Australia. At the start of the war, Bank of England officials in London worked with South Africa to block gold shipments to Germany, and force mine owners to sell only to the British Treasury, at prices set by the Treasury. This facilitated purchases of munitions and food in the United States and neutral countries.

== World War II ==
=== Declaration of war against the Axis ===
On 4 September 1939, the United Party caucus refused to accept Hertzog's stance of neutrality in World War II. Hertzog resigned rather than accept the ruling and Smuts was elected in his stead. Upon becoming Prime Minister of South Africa, Smuts declared South Africa officially at war with Germany and the Axis. Smuts immediately set about fortifying South Africa against any possible German sea invasion because of South Africa's global strategic importance controlling the long sea route around the Cape of Good Hope.

Smuts took severe action against the pro-German South African Ossewabrandwag movement (they were caught committing acts of sabotage) and interned its leaders for the duration of the war. (One of them, John Vorster, was to become future prime minister of South Africa.) (See Jan Smuts during World War II.)

=== Prime Minister and Field Marshal Smuts ===
Prime Minister Jan Smuts was the only important non-British general whose advice was constantly sought by Britain's wartime Prime Minister Winston Churchill. Smuts was invited to the Imperial War Cabinet in 1939 as the most senior South African in favour of war. On 28 May 1941, Smuts was appointed a Field Marshal of the British Army, becoming the first South African to hold that rank. Ultimately, Smuts would pay a steep political price for his closeness to the British establishment, to the King, and to Churchill which had made Smuts very unpopular among the conservative nationalistic Afrikaners, leading to his eventual downfall, whereas most English-speaking whites and a minority of liberal Afrikaners in South Africa remained loyal to him. (See Jan Smuts during World War II.)

=== Military contributions and casualties in World War II ===
South Africa and its military forces contributed in many theatres of war. South Africa's contribution consisted mainly of supplying troops, men and material for the North African campaign (the Desert War) and the Italian Campaign as well as to Allied ships that docked at its crucial ports adjoining the Atlantic Ocean and Indian Ocean that converge at the tip of Southern Africa. Numerous volunteers also flew for the Royal Air Force. (See: South African Army in World War II; South African Air Force in World War II; South African Navy in World War II; South Africa's contribution in World War II.)

1. The South African Army and Air Force helped defeat the Italian army of the Fascist Benito Mussolini that had invaded Abyssinia (now known as Ethiopia) in 1935. During the 1941 East African Campaign South African forces made important contribution to this early Allied victory.
2. Another important victory in which the South Africans participated was the liberation of Malagasy (now known as Madagascar) from the control of the Vichy French who were allies of the Nazis. British troops, aided by South African soldiers, staged their attack from South Africa, and occupied the strategic island in 1942 to preclude its seizure by the Japanese.
3. The South African 1st Infantry Division took part in several actions in North Africa in 1941 and 1942, including the Battle of El Alamein, before being withdrawn to South Africa.
4. The South African 2nd Infantry Division also took part in a number of actions in North Africa during 1942, but on 21 June 1942 two complete infantry brigades of the division as well as most of the supporting units were captured at the fall of Tobruk.
5. The South African 3rd Infantry Division never took an active part in any battles but instead organised and trained the South African home defence forces, performed garrison duties and supplied replacements for the South African 1st Infantry Division and the South African 2nd Infantry Division. However, one of this division's constituent brigades - 7 SA Motorised Brigade - did take part in the invasion of Madagascar in 1942.
6. The South African 6th Armoured Division fought in numerous actions in Italy from 1944 to 1945.
7. South Africa contributed to the war effort against Japan, supplying men and manning ships in naval engagements against the Japanese.

Of the 334,000 men who volunteered for the South African Armed Forces during the war (including some 211,000 whites, 77,000 blacks and 46,000 "coloureds" and Asians), nearly 9,000 were killed in action.

== Post 1945 ==
South Africa emerged from the Allied victory with its prestige and national honour enhanced as it had fought tirelessly for the Western Allies. South Africa's standing in the international community was rising, at a time when the Third World's struggle against colonialism had still not taken centre stage. In May 1945, Prime Minister Smuts represented South Africa in San Francisco at the drafting of the United Nations Charter. Just as he did in 1919, Smuts urged the delegates to create a powerful international body to preserve peace; he was determined that, unlike the League of Nations, the United Nations would have teeth. Smuts signed the Paris Peace Treaty, resolving the peace in Europe, thus becoming the only signatory of both the treaty ending the First World War, and that ending the Second.

However, internal political struggles in the disgruntled and essentially impoverished Afrikaner community would soon come to the fore leading to Smuts' defeat at the polls in the 1948 elections (in which only whites and coloureds could vote) at the hands of a resurgent National Party after the war. This began the road to South Africa's eventual isolation from a world that would no longer tolerate any forms of political discrimination or differentiation based on race only.
