= Raymond Elisha =

South African politician

Member of the North West Executive Council for Public Works, Roads and Transport
- In office 3 May 2012 – 6 May 2014
- Premier: Thandi Modise
- Preceded by: Mahlakeng Mahlakeng
- Succeeded by: Madoda Sambatha (for Public Works and Roads)

Member of the North West Executive Council for Education
- In office 25 November 2010 – 3 May 2012
- Premier: Thandi Modise
- Preceded by: Johannes Tselapedi
- Succeeded by: Louisa Mabe

Personal details
- Citizenship: South Africa
- Party: African National Congress

Boikanyo Raymond Elisha is a South African politician who represented the African National Congress (ANC) in the North West Provincial Legislature until 2019. He served in the North West Executive Council under Premier Thandi Modise as the North West's Member of the Executive Council (MEC) for Education from 2010 to 2012 and MEC for Public Works, Roads and Transport from 2012 to 2014.

== Legislative career ==
Elisha was elected to the North West Provincial Legislature in the 2009 general election, ranked 16th on the ANC's provincial party list. On 25 November 2010, newly elected Premier Thandi Modise announced that he would join the North West Executive Council as Member of the Executive Council (MEC) for Education. He remained in that portfolio until 3 May 2012, when he was appointed MEC for Public Works, Roads and Transport in a reshuffle by Modise.

In the 2014 general election, he was ranked 11th on the ANC's provincial party list and gained re-election to the provincial legislature, but he was not reappointed to the Executive Council. However, midway through the legislative term, in August 2017, he was appointed as Deputy Chief Whip of the Majority Party in the legislature, succeeding Hoffman Galeng, who was appointed as an MEC. In the 2019 general election, Elisha was ranked 29th on the party list and failed to gain re-election.
