= Kgakgamatso Nkewu =

South African politician

Member of the North West Executive Council for Social Development
- In office 8 May 2016 – 7 July 2016
- Premier: Supra Mahumapelo
- Preceded by: Fenny Gaolaolwe
- Succeeded by: Hoffman Galeng

Provincial Treasurer of the North West African National Congress
- In office February 2015 – 7 July 2016
- Chairperson: Supra Mahumapelo
- Preceded by: Philly Mapulane
- Succeeded by: Sello Lehari

Personal details
- Born: 27 May 1972 Molelema, Taung; Transvaal, South Africa
- Died: 7 July 2016 (aged 44)
- Party: African National Congress

Kgakgamatso Jeanette Nkewu (27 May 1972 – 7 July 2016), also known as Kgakgamatso Morwagaswe, was a South African politician who served as the North West's Member of the Executive Council (MEC) for Social Development from May 2016 until her death in July 2016. She also served as Provincial Treasurer of the ANC's North West branch from February 2015 until her death. A member of the African National Congress (ANC), she was formerly a local councillor in Greater Taung Local Municipality.

== Early life ==
Nkewu was born on 27 May 1972 in the village of Molelema near Taung in the present-day North West province. She joined the ANC in the early 1990s and was active in its Youth League and Women's League. In 2013, she completed a degree in project management at Southern Business College.

== Career in government ==
She represented the ANC as a local councillor in Greater Taung Local Municipality, where she was a Member of the Mayoral Committee, until February 2015, when she was elected as Provincial Treasurer of the ANC's North West branch, serving under Provincial Chairperson Supra Mahumapelo.

She therefore was not initially elected to the fifth North West Provincial Legislature, which was constituted in 2014, but she was sworn in to the provincial legislature during the legislative term and joined the North West Executive Council in a reshuffle on 8 May 2016. Mahumapelo, in his capacity as North West Premier, appointed her as MEC for Social Development. She remained in her dual positions as MEC and ANC Provincial Treasurer until her death later in 2016.

== Personal life and death ==
She died on 7 July 2016 in a car accident on the N18 near Vryburg. She was travelling from Mafikeng to Taung, where she was scheduled to attend a campaign event ahead of the 2016 local elections, when her car collided with a cyclist; the cyclist was also killed and Nkewu's two bodyguards were hospitalised. Her memorial service, held in Taung, included speeches by Mahumapelo and ANC Women's League stalwarts Bathabile Dlamini and Baleka Mbete. Fenny Gaolaolwe acted as Social Development MEC until August 2017, when Hoffman Galeng was appointed as Nkewu's permanent replacement in the Executive Council.

Nkewu was married and had two sons, who were aged four and 22 when she died.
