= Collen Malatji =

South African politician

President of the African National Congress Youth League
- Incumbent
- Assumed office 1 July 2023
- Deputy: Phumzile Mgcina
- Preceded by: Collen Maine

Member of the National Assembly

Assembly Member for Gauteng
- In office 22 May 2019 – 28 May 2024

Personal details
- Born: Thlologelo Collen Malatji; 18 March 1993 (age 33) Tembisa, South Africa
- Party: African National Congress
- Education: University of Johannesburg
- Profession: Politician

Thlologelo Collen Malatji (born 18 March 1993) is a South African politician and the president of the African National Congress Youth League. He was elected to the presidency at the league's conference in July 2023. He was a Member of Parliament between 2019 and 2024.

== Early life and education ==
Malatji was born on 18 March 1993 in Tembisa in the former Transvaal Province. He studied municipal governance at the University of Johannesburg. He is currently studying for a social sciences degree at the University of the Witwatersrand.

== Political career ==
Malatji was just 13 years old when he joined the Congress of South African Students (COSAS). He served as the organisation's regional secretary in Ekurhuleni, as its provincial secretary in Gauteng, and finally as its national president. In the Youth League of the African National Congress (ANC) he was chairperson of his local branch and later the deputy chairperson of a regional branch. By 2019, he was the convenor of the ANC Youth League in Ekurhuleni.

He was cited by the Mail & Guardian as one of "200 Young South Africans" for his work in politics and government in 2018. He was number 85 on Avance Media's list of the 100 Most Influential Young South Africans in 2020.

== Member of Parliament: 2019–2024 ==
Malatji was ranked 18th on the ANC's list of candidates in the Gauteng region for the general election on 8 May 2019. He was elected to a seat in the National Assembly and was sworn into office on 22 May 2019. He sat on the Portfolio Committee on Higher Education, Science and Technology between June 2019 and August 2021. From August 2021 he sat on the newly recreated Portfolio Committee on Human Settlements. He served a single term in his seat, failing to gain re-election in the May 2024 general election.

== President of the ANC Youth League: 2023–present ==
During the 26th National Congress of the ANC Youth League on 1 July 2023, Malatji was elected unopposed as president of the league after Aphiwe Mkhangelwa declined the nomination from delegates. Candidates from Malatji's "Economic freedom or death" slate were also elected unopposed.
