= Desmond Moela =

South African politician

Desmond Lawrence Moela (born 15 May 1982) is a South African politician. A party member of the African National Congress (ANC), he also been serving as a Member of the National Assembly of South Africa since the 22 May 2019. Moela had previously been involved in the African National Congress Youth League (ANCYL).

== Biography ==
Desmond Lawrence Moela was born 15 May 1982 in Phola, Hazyview part of the previous Transvaal Province. Moela had been involved in community youth development from as early as ten years old. He joined the Congress of South African Students (COSAS) and the ANC Youth League at the age of thirteen. Later, he became the president of the student representative council at Mshadza High School and matriculated from the school in 2002.

Moela served as the Provincial Chairperson of COSAS in Mpumalanga. While studying at the Tshwane University of Technology (TUT), he became active within the South African Student Congress (SASCO). He went on to obtain a diploma in public management from TUT. Early on in his career, Moela was deployed to be the Regional Task Team (RTT) Convener of the ANC Youth League in eNhlanzeni Region to prepare the region towards the regional elective congress. The regional ANC Youth League elected him as the chairperson. In 2013, he was elected the provincial chairperson of the ANC Youth League. Moela was elected deputy president of ANC Youth League in 2015 and served in the post until it was disbanded by the national executive committee of the ANC.

From 2009 to 2011, he worked as a supply chain management officer at the Mpumalanga Provincial Department of Education. Between 2011 and 2014, he worked as a parliamentary liaison officer at the provincial department. He served as a director of human resource management at the department of education from 2014 until he resigned in 2019 when he was elected to the Parliament of South Africa.

== Personal life ==
Moela is married to Pretty Dube and together they have two sons.
