= Phumzile Mbatha-Cele =

South African politician

Phumzile Mbatha-Cele MPL

Member of the KwaZulu-Natal Provincial Legislature
- Incumbent
- Assumed office 29 August 2016

Personal details
- Citizenship: South Africa
- Party: African National Congress

Phumzile Harriet Mbatha-Cele is a South African politician who has represented the African National Congress (ANC) in the KwaZulu-Natal Provincial Legislature since August 2016. She is also a former Mayor of Newcastle.

== Political career ==
Mbatha-Cele is from Amajuba in KwaZulu-Natal. She was the Mayor of Newcastle in Amajuba until May 2007, when opposition parties in the Newcastle council collaborated to remove her and her deputy from office; she was replaced by Mercy Dube of the Inkatha Freedom Party. By 2015, she was the Deputy Regional Secretary of the ANC's eMalahleni regional branch in KwaZulu-Natal. She was still in that office on 29 August 2016, when she sworn in as a Member of the KwaZulu-Natal Provincial Legislature; she filled a casual vacancy created by the resignation of Makhosini Nkosi, who became Mayor of Newcastle after the 2016 local elections.

In May 2018, Mbatha-Cele was elected Deputy Regional Chairperson of the ANC in eMalahleni, deputising Ntuthuko Mahlaba. She was elected to her first full term in the legislature in the 2019 general election, ranked 36th on the ANC's provincial party list. However, in September 2021, she was succeeded as ANC Deputy Regional Chairperson by Phumzile Mgcina.
