= Jan Smuts and the Old Boers =

South African prime minister

Jan Christiaan Smuts, OM (24 May 1870 – 11 September 1950) served as Prime Minister of the Union of South Africa from 1919 to 1924 and from 1939 to 1948. He played a leading part in the post war settlements at the end of both world wars, making significant contributions towards the creation of both the League of Nations and the United Nations.

Smuts was a minister in the government of Louis Botha, from the creation of the Union of South Africa in 1910 until the outbreak of the First World War in 1914. The formation of a new pan-South African Afrikaner party seemed to promise a new age of cooperation, but the party was soon wracked by dissent, identity crisis, and division. The breakdown of government control, and the descent towards civil war, was only further prevented by the advent of the First World War. During this period, Smuts further solidified his political alliance and personal friendship with Louis Botha.

== Jockeying for position ==
=== Construction begins ===
A new nation required a new prime minister. Smuts knew that he wasn't in the running, being too young and hot-headed. On the other hand, Botha was a front-runner and devoted his time to lobbying politicians, accordingly. This allowed Smuts a consolation. Although the Act of Union had been signed, the Transvaal still had another six months of independence, and, with Botha concentrating on jockeying for position, Smuts made the most of it.

Thanks to the Transvaal's fantastic wealth, the treasury was overflowing. Smuts' ambition for Pretoria to be the sole capital city of South Africa was thwarted, but he saw to it that the city would not miss out. He ordered the construction of the Union Buildings, high above Pretoria. They would act as the nerve centre of the South African administration. The total budget would be set at £1.5m: a fortune equivalent to over £700m in 2005.

Meanwhile, the new governor-general of South Africa, Lord Gladstone, was constructing his government. Opinion of the time dictated that Gladstone had two options for prime minister, Louis Botha and John X. Merriman, the prime minister of the Cape Colony. Smuts trusted his old ally, Botha to form a sensible government, but some didn't. The old foes from Bloemfontein, Steyn, Hertzog, and de Wet, all backed Merriman, fearing that an unsympathetic Afrikaner would be infinitely worse than an unsympathetic Briton. In the end, Smuts' backing won the day, and Gladstone appointed Botha to be prime minister.

This, in turn, gave Botha free rein in constructing his cabinet. Smuts was the clear favourite to take one of the top jobs, but Botha had other ideas. Of nine cabinet offices, Botha offered Smuts three key positions: Minister for the Interior, Minister for Mines, and Minister for Defence. This gave Smuts control of virtually every area of government; Botha and Smuts now ruled all of South Africa in tandem.

=== A new party ===
This government was still but a construction of the British élite, and not a representation of the people. Smuts knew that, although the people in the cabinet were right for the job, the old party structure could not survive into a new era. The leadership of Het Volk arranged a meeting with the representatives of the other Afrikaans parties, seeking to unite them into a single political bloc. From the Cape, came the Afrikaner Bond, and from the Orange Colony, Orangia Unie. Smuts persuaded them all to unite with Het Volk under one party leadership, to pursue common goals in the new Parliament. For the first time, Steyn and Botha, Hertzog and Smuts, were in agreement. Just in time for the first elections, the South African Party (SAP) was created.

In the September 1910 election, the new party won an outright majority in the South African Parliament, with 67 of the 130 seats. More promisingly, the opposition, the Unionist Party, was in broad agreement with many of the SAP's aims. The party appointed Botha leader and Smuts his deputy, and confirmed their government.

== Smuts and Botha take control ==
=== The Hatter's tea party ===
Old resentments, as always, took a heavy toll on the government. With Botha as Prime Minister, Henry Charles Hull as Minister for Finance, and Smuts heading as many ministries as he could, the Transvaal élite dominated the government, to the chagrin of some and to the detriment of national unity. Although a veteran of Johannesburg, being British made Hull the primary target for the most acute criticism from the administration's enemies. Moreover, being of different stock meant that Hull held different opinions on important economic matters.

A cabinet dispute over the railways gave Botha the perfect pretext to relieve himself of Hull. The loss of a cabinet member led to a great reshuffle. Smuts remained Minister for Defence, gave up his roles as Minister for Mines and as Minister for the Interior, and gained Hull's former post. Although the business communities in South Africa were happy to see the roles shared out more evenly, they were aghast at the idea of Smuts holding the Finance Ministry. He had no experience of business or of commerce, and his legal practice had hardly been a roaring success.

Perhaps more importantly, they resented the union of the ministries for Finance and Defence: two ministries that were usually at each other's throats over funding and necessity. The fear was that Smuts would appropriate any funds that he thought necessary, and, as an ex-soldier, those funds were thought to be vast, with many MPs citing the use of the Transvaal's treasury in its last days as examples of Smuts' profligacy. To stymie Smuts, the House of Assembly threw out much of his financial policy, although falling short of refusing his budget. Despite the disputes over Smuts' appointment, the man himself pressed on with his policies, stridently ignoring criticism, as he had always done. Smuts' obstinateness became the butt of jokes, some of which described South Africa as "a democracy, with due apologies to Jan Smuts".

=== Schism ===
Since the formation of the Union of South Africa, James Hertzog had been an impatient and uncomfortable minister in the Botha cabinet. Despite being the most powerful of the influential Bloemfontein circle, he held only the position as Minister for Justice. Hertzog refused to accept Anglophile influences in the cabinet, and, in that category, he included Smuts. Hertzog was issued an ultimatum, to either put up or shut up. When he refused, Botha dissolved the cabinet and dismissed the rebellious minister. It was exactly as Hertzog had intended, for he sought to be portrayed as a defender of the Afrikaners. Upon his return to the Free State, Steyn said that Hertzog had been "martyred for what he had done for the Dutch".

Before the 1913 conference of the South African Party, in Cape Town, Hertzog persuaded Christiaan De Wet to support his campaign against Louis Botha and Smuts. Opening the conference, De Wet proposed a motion calling for the two leaders to resign, to be replaced by Steyn. The conference was thrown into disarray. The Old Boers, led by De Wet, Steyn, and Hertzog, spoke passionately for the expulsion of 'foreign' influences. However, when the motion came to the vote, Botha and Smuts triumphed, pulling through by the skin of their teeth. The Old Boers were outraged, and marched out of the conference. In 1914, this core of Old Boers, together with a few inexperienced politicians, such as Daniel François Malan and Tielman Johannes Roos, formed its own party, opposed to everything for which Smuts and Botha stood. They would become the National Party.

== Civil unrest ==
=== The miners' strike ===
Besides internal party struggles, Smuts had to contend with threats to his authority, and that of the government, from the general public. Socialist restlessness had spread from Europe, and, inflamed by the split within the Afrikaner leadership and the dispute over cheap Asian labour, caused great social unrest amongst Afrikaner miners. In 1913, a mine manager's decision to cap wages at his mine led to a strike. Smuts attempted to maintain a policy of neutrality, but the dispute soon got out of control, with recriminations from both sides.

Governor-General Gladstone demanded an end to Smuts' non-interference, and ordered him to mediate. Although Smuts preferred not to, fearing that his interference would make matters worse, he reluctantly accepted the order. He ordered the arrest of trade union leaders, as requested by Gladstone, but the troubles escalated further.

=== Johannesburg is burning ===
A mass meeting was scheduled for 4 July in Johannesburg, but, at the last minute, Smuts refused it permission. It went ahead, under close police scrutiny, and striking soon turned to rioting. Smuts had not foreseen such a violent reaction, and responded by sending in the army, even without Gladstone's permission. That night, the rioting intensified into running battles with the police and army. Things came to a head outside the Rand Club, as an angry crowd refused to disperse, and soldiers opened fire. 21 demonstrators were killed, and 51 were wounded.

When reports of the incident at the Rand Club reached Pretoria by telegraph, Smuts resorted to personal action. He and Botha grabbed a car, and drove to Johannesburg, without accompaniment by assistance or bodyguard. They drove slowly and quietly to the centre of Johannesburg, as best as they could without being seen. A meeting with the Strike Committee was arranged, but what Smuts and Botha had assumed would be a professional meeting resembled a hostage situation, as the two were held at gun-point as they were dictated the unions' terms. With the authorities being beaten on the streets of Johannesburg, secondary strikes breaking out across South Africa, and guns literally pointing at their heads, Smuts and Botha were forced to meet the strikers' demands.

Smuts and Botha communicated the terms to the mining magnates, located on the other side of Johannesburg, but, on their way back to the union leaders, they were confronted by a group of armed rioters. The crowd, unaware of the mediation in which the two were playing a part, bayed for blood. Just as it seemed the end was near, Botha stood up and declared his intention clearly and plainly, whilst containing his anger and warrior aspect. The bloodlust subsided, and they were allowed to proceed. All the while, Smuts kept quiet. His instinct was to fight, and he had to keep his instincts under control.

=== The general strike ===
The end of rioting in Bloemfontein was by no means the end of South Africa's civil strife. In the first days of 1914, when nationalisation of the South African railways brought about job cuts, the Amalgamated Society of Railwaymen and Harbour Workers objected, and went on strike. Led by a firebrand Afrikaner, Hessel Poutsma, the railwaymen went on strike. As Finance Minister, Smuts took over responsibility from the Minister for Railways, and, characteristically, refused to budge. In response, Poutsma requested that the Transvaal Federation of Trades Unions intervene. On 13 January, they did, by calling a general strike.

The GTUC quickly built an efficient organisation, complete with military structure, distributing small arms and issuing propaganda inciting the overthrow of the South African government. Reeling from his defeat at the hands of the miners, Smuts refused to roll over. As Defence Minister, Smuts called up 10,000 reservists, instituted martial law, and seized the most important economic assets: the railroads and mines. Furthermore, Smuts dispatched an infantry detachment, armed with artillery and under the command of Koos de la Rey, to surround the strike leaders, holed up in Johannesburg. De la Rey reached his position on 18 January, and, without any means of defending themselves, the union chiefs surrendered.

On 27 January, Smuts took nine of the leaders from their prison cells, and ordered them to be deported, without warrant or trial. The steamship Umgeni was to leave Durban for London on the morning of the 30th, and Smuts was determined that it take the nine passengers. The captain of the Umgeni refused to comply, seeing it as an illegal act for which he would be held responsible. Smuts cleared the captain and his company of any potential wrongdoings, and took responsibility himself, allowing the union leaders, including Poutsma, to be deported without delay.

Smuts was widely condemned from almost all quarters. The courts, the trade unions, the Labour Party, and the Old Boers complained, but Smuts could still rely upon the support of his own party. With a working majority, Smuts presented a bill, the Indemnity and Undesirables Special Importation Bill, to Parliament that would retrospectively make his actions legal and clear Smuts and the government of any wrongdoings. Despite the howls of protest from the two major opposition parties, his bill was passed. In Smuts' own words, "A smashing blow had to be struck at syndicalism in South Africa. I gave that blow." It was this forceful attack on trade unionism that forged the Old Boers, the unions, and the Labour Party together, as a united front against what they saw as treason and tyranny.

== First World War and the Maritz Rebellion ==
With the outbreak of the First World War South Africa along with the other British Dominions fought on the side of the British Empire. The South African Government agreed to the withdrawal of British Army units so that they were free to join the European war, and laid plans to invade the German colony of South-West Africa. Elements of the South African army refused to fight against the Germans and along with other opponents of the Government rose in open revolt. The Government declared martial law on 14 October 1914, and forces loyal to the Government under the command of General Louis Botha and Jan Smuts proceeded to destroy the Maritz Rebellion. The leading Boer rebels got off lightly with terms of imprisonment of six and seven years and heavy fines. Two years later they were released from prison, as Louis Botha recognised the value of reconciliation. After this, those who had taken part in the rebellion and wished to further the aims of the rebellion, concentrated on working within the constitutional system and helped to build up the National Party.

The Maritz Rebellion was so notable that in Afrikaans it is merely referred to as 'the Rebellion'.

== Notes ==
1. Accounting for inflation and economic growth in the United Kingdom: Economic History Service: "How much is that?"
2. Although this is sometimes considered to be a general strike, particularly amongst contemporary and modern members of the South African labour movement, it did not receive the blessing of any trade union congress.
