= African National Congress Youth League =

Youth wing of the African National Congress

- President: Collen Malatji
- Secretary General: Tsakani Shiviti
- Founded: 10 September 1944
- Headquarters: Luthuli House; 54 Sauer Street; Johannesburg; Gauteng
- Mother party: African National Congress
- International affiliation: International Union of Socialist Youth (IUSY); World Federation of Democratic Youth (WFDY)
- Magazine: Hlomelang
- Website: anc1912.org.za

The African National Congress Youth League (ANCYL) is the youth wing of the African National Congress (ANC). As set out in its constitution, the ANC Youth League is led by a National Executive Committee (NEC) and a National Working Committee (NWC).

== Foundation ==
The idea of the formation of the ANC youth league started in 1943, in Orlando, Soweto at Walter Sisulu's house by Anton Lembede, A.P. Mda, Jordan Ngubane, Nelson Mandela and Oliver Tambo. Its founders felt that ANC was dominated by conservative and older generation who cannot relate to the youth. This "older generation" had used deputations and delegations to try to get the Union government to grant equal rights to all but it became increasingly clear that this tactic was ineffective. Since the formation of the ANC in 1912, the disenfranchisement of black people had taken place and expanded through laws such as land acts, the introduction of workplace colour bar and urban and influx control between 1913 and 1926. Once the discussions of forming a youth league were concluded, the young leaders approached ANC president Dr. Alfred Bitini Xuma and made a proposal to form a youth league. Dr. Xuma had reservations about this league formation due to its militancy but allowed the issue to be debated at the 1943 ANC conference, which resolved to establish a youth league.

The first conference of the youth league was in March 1944 and it was attended by 200 people. The ANC had deployed Selope Thema, activist and former South African Native National Congress secretary, to open the congress. Albertina Sisulu, the wife of Walter Sisulu, was the only female present. The conference elected Anton Lembede as president, Victor Mbodo was elected vice president, Walter Sisulu as treasurer, and Oliver Tambo as secretary. A.P. Mda, A.Nxamala, David Bopape, Peter Burman, and Joseph Mokoena were elected to the executive together with many others.

Its foundation in 1944 by A. P. Mda, Anton Lembede, Mxolisi Majombozi, Walter Sisulu and Oliver Tambo marked the rise of a new generation of leaders. The first President of the league was Anton Lembede who shaped its militancy. Mandela wrote that Lembede had a "magnetic personality who thought in original and often startling ways" and "Like Lembede I came to see the antidote as militant African nationalism." Lembede died in 1947.

By the end of the 1940s, the Youth League had gained control of the African National Congress. It called for civil disobedience and strikes in protest at the hundreds of laws associated with the new apartheid system. These protests were often met with force by the South African Government. In 1950, 18 blacks were killed during a walkout, while protesters, including Mandela, were jailed and beaten for their opposition to the government.

Thabo Mbeki became active in the Youth League in 1956 and was expelled from high school in 1959 as a result of participation in a strike. In 1959 many ANCYL members broke away to form the rival Pan Africanist Congress (PAC). In 1960, the PAC, ANC and its associated organisations had been banned. Mbeki organised a stay-at-home in protest at the South African Government's decision to leave the Commonwealth of Nations before leaving South Africa at the suggestion of the ANC.

The Youth League continued its activities underground during the remainder of the apartheid years. In 1990, F. W. de Klerk legalised the ANC and its associated organisations including the Youth League, and Peter Mokaba led the newly unbanned Youth League.

In 2005, Fikile Mbalula became president of the league. Mbalula succeeded the student activist Malusi Gigaba, who went on to become deputy minister of home affairs. Mbalula had served as secretary general of the ANCYL under Gigaba's leadership. It was under Mbalula's leadership that the ANCYL took on a more visible role in defending Jacob Zuma, and publicly lobbying for his election as ANC president.

Following an extremely heated campaign and a disorderly plenary, Julius Sello Malema was elected ANC Youth League president at the league's 23rd National Conference in Bloemfontein in April 2008 and was re-elected in Midrand on June 2011 to serve for the second term as the president of the league.

In November 2011, Julius Malema was found guilty of provoking divisions within the ruling party and of bringing the organisation into disrepute, and was suspended for five years. Subsequent appeal processes changed the suspension to expulsion. On 24 April 2012 the appeal process ended when the National Disciplinary Committee of Appeal confirmed Malema's expulsion with immediate effect. The appeal committee also confirmed league spokesperson Floyd Shivambu's three-year suspension and suspended secretary general Sindiso Magaqa for one year, reducing the original disciplinary committee's three-year suspension.

Following the above, the league started to experience a devastating decline in support and popularity among young people. The league was ultimately taken to its 25th National conference in 2015, which elected Collen and Njabulo Nzuza as President and Secretary General respectively. The duo and their collective failed to live up to expectations and failed to take the ANCYL to its elective conference. The ANC National Executive Committee finally dissolved/disbanded the ANCYL NEC, due to many of its failures.

The ANC appointed a National Youth Task Team to oversee the affairs of ANC Youth League and take it conference. The task team consisted of the ANC's own NEC and NWC members who were above the age of 35 - which is the constitutional ceiling of the ANCYL. In 2020 a collective of young members of the ANC and its youth league, led by Nonceba Mhlauli, Katlego Mamabolo, Luzuko Bashman, Ngoako Selamolela and collective, mobilized and organized young people from all over the country, under the banner of the ANCYL Crisis Committee, to call for the disbandment of the ANCYL National Youth Task Team, due to the illegality and unconstutionality of the structure.

The ANCYL Crisis Committee argued that senior ANC member must stay away from the affairs of young people, as the youth are capable of rebuilding their own structure. In early 2021 the NEC of the ANC was persuaded by the logic of the ANCYL Crisis Committee and disbanded the ANC National Youth Task Team and appointed a National Congress Preparatory Team led by Nonceba Mhlauli and Joy Maimela, as National convenor and coordinator respectively.

During the 26th National Congress of the Youth League held from 29 June to 2 July 2023, Gauteng Youth League member Collen Malatji was elected as president with Phumzile Mgcina as deputy president. Mntuwoxolo Ngudle was elected Secretary-General. The League's constitution was also amended to allow for a second Deputy Secretary-General; Tsakani Shiviti and Olga Seate were then elected as the First and Second Secretaries-General, respectively. Zwelo Masilela was elected Treasurer-General.

== Leaders ==
Past leaders of the ANCYL include:

- Anton Lembede: 1944–1947
- A. P. Mda: 1948–1950
- Nelson Mandela: 1950–1960
- Jackie Selebi: 1987–1991
- Peter Mokaba: 1991–1994
- Lulu Johnson: 1994–1996
- Malusi Gigaba: 1996–2004
- Fikile Mbalula: 2004–2008
- Julius Malema: 2008–2012
- Collen Maine: 2015–2019
- Collen Malatji: 2023–present

== Controversies ==
=== Support for Jacob Zuma ===
The Youth League generated significant controversy in 2008 when its president publicly declared its willingness to use violence to prevent Jacob Zuma's being prosecuted for corruption charges, stating that the Youth League was "prepared to take up arms and kill for Zuma". In further remarks, Julius Malema has called for the elimination of so-called "counter-revolutionary" forces, which include the largest opposition party, the Democratic Alliance. These statements have drawn significant public criticism, and the ANC has on occasion distanced itself from Malema's remarks. Further statements made against the DA's leader in 2009, stating that they were "disgusted by remarks attributed to Helen Zille." These statements were in response to a statement by Zille that "Zuma is a self-confessed womaniser with deeply sexist views, who put all his wives at risk by having unprotected sex with an HIV-positive woman." The ANC Youth League has been widely criticized for these statements, and has thus far been unable to explain their meaning, including during appearances on Talk Radio 702, a national radio station. The spokesperson, Floyd Shivambu kept on saying that their meaning of sleeping around is: "sleeping around". He was unable to clarify whether sleeping around means having sex or not having sex.

On 17 March 2013 the ANC National Executive disbanded the ANCYL's National Executive Committee, a move that was widely seen to be a purging of opponents of Jacob Zuma.

=== Julius Malema and "Kill the Boer" ===
In 2010 Julius Malema sang a controversial apartheid struggle song "Shoot the Boer" (Boer being the Afrikaans word for "farmer"), which drew further criticism in light of the numerous killings of white farmers and black labourers across South Africa. The South African Equality Court ruled that the song motivated genocide and was thus declared hate speech and interdict for its singing in public and private meetings, was issued. The ANCYL stated that they are willing to contest the judgement in the Constitutional Court.

In November 2011 ANC Youth League president Julius Malema was suspended from the ruling party for two years, this sanction was suspended for three years. The finding and penalty relate to Malema, ANCYL deputy president Ronald Lamola, treasurer general Pule Mabe, secretary general Sindiso Magaqa and deputy secretary general Kenetswe Mosenogi. The youth league leaders were charged for bringing the party into disrepute after saying earlier this year that the ANCYL would send a team to Botswana to consolidate local opposition parties and help bring about regime change there.

Following that finding, Julius Malema was found guilty of provoking divisions within the ruling party and of bringing the organisation into disrepute. As a result, ANC Youth League leader Julius Malema had to "vacate his position".

=== Hacking of official website ===
On 30 March 2011, the ANC Youth League's website was hacked with a fake post under its news section, "Latest ANCYL News". The post's headline, "Julius Malema to Step Down as Youth League President" was posted as a statement by Julius Malema tendering his resignation because he had "made a fool of himself." Some reasons were listed for his resignation: "I have brought my party the ANC into disrepute (sic); I have disrespected my elders and have made a fool out of myself; I promote my own agenda over my country and parties; I promote the singing of racist songs to promote violence and unrest in the country."

On 13 June 2011, the ANC Youth League's website was hacked again, this time with a fake post under its news section, "Julius Malema defects to Cope". A subsequent hack on 24 July 2011, placed a banner at the top of the home page with the statement, "HA HA HA I have a 16 Million Rand house And all of you dont!!!!", in reference to allegations in media that Julius Malema was building himself a R16 million house in the elite Johannesburg suburb of Sandton. This was followed the next day, 25 July 2011, by another hack superimposing the faces of Julius Malema and Jacob Zuma, the President of the African National Congress and South Africa, on the poster for the movie Dumb & Dumber.

=== Russian invasion of Ukraine ===
During the Russian invasion of Ukraine, President Cyril Ramaphosa and the African National Congress have pursued a policy of strict neutrality. The ANC youth wing, meanwhile, has condemned sanctions against Russia and denounced NATO's eastward expansion as "fascistic". Officials representing the ANC Youth League acted as international observers for Russia's staged referendum to annex Ukrainian territory conquered during the war.

== Notes ==
- "Nelson Mandela." Contemporary Black Biography, Volume 14. Gale Research, 1997. Reproduced in Biography Resource Center. Farmington Hills, Mich.: Thomson Gale. 2005. retrieved 5 December 2005
- "Thabo Mvuyelwa Mbeki." Contemporary Black Biography, Volume 14. Gale Research, 1997. Reproduced in Biography Resource Center. Farmington Hills, Mich.: Thomson Gale. 2005.
- Halisi, C.R.D. (1 November 1999). Black Political Thought in the Making of South African Democracy. Indiana University Press. p. 62. ISBN 0-253-33589-2.
