= North West (National Assembly of South Africa constituency) =

Multi-member constituency

- Bokone Bophirima
- Constituency for the National Assembly of South Africa
- Location of North West within South Africa
- Province: North West
- Population: 4,108,816 (2020)
- Electorate: 1,702,728 (2019)

Current constituency
- Created: 1994
- Seats: List: 13 (2014–present); 14 (2009–2014); 17 (–2009)
- Members of the National Assembly: List: Nombuyiselo Adoons (ANC); Leon Basson (DA); Khanya Ceza (EFF); Sibusiso Kula (ANC); Tidimalo Legwase (ANC); Supra Mahumapelo (ANC); Jane Manganye (ANC); Philemon Mapulane (ANC); Joe McGluwa (DA); Constance Mkhonto (EFF); Ezekiel Molala (ANC); Asnath Molekwa (ANC); Mothusi Montwedi (EFF); Itiseng Morolong (ANC); Cheryl Phillips (DA); Isaac Seitlholo (DA); Bridgette Tlhomelang (ANC)

North West (Tswana: Bokone Bophirima) is one of the nine multi-member constituencies of the National Assembly of South Africa, the lower house of the Parliament of South Africa, the national legislature of South Africa. The constituency was established in 1994 when the National Assembly was established by the Interim Constitution following the end of Apartheid. It is conterminous with the province of North West. The constituency currently elects 13 of the 400 members of the National Assembly using the closed party-list proportional representation electoral system. At the 2019 general election it had 1,702,728 registered electors.

== Electoral system ==
North West currently elects 13 of the 400 members of the National Assembly using the closed party-list proportional representation electoral system. Constituency seats are allocated using the largest remainder method with a Droop quota.

== Election results ==
=== Summary ===
Election	Pan Africanist Congress PAC			United Democratic Movement UDM			African National Congress ANC			Democratic Alliance DA/DP			New National Party NNP/NP			African Christian Democratic Party ACDP			Inkatha Freedom Party IFP			Economic Freedom Fighters EFF			Freedom Front Plus VF+/VFFF/VV-FF		
Election	Votes	%	Seats	Votes	%	Seats	Votes	%	Seats	Votes	%	Seats	Votes	%	Seats	Votes	%	Seats	Votes	%	Seats	Votes	%	Seats	Votes	%	Seats
2019	1,007	0.10%	0	3,420	0.34%	0	633,223	63.69%	9	112,417	11.31%	2				4,084	0.41%	0	955	0.10%	0	169,880	17.09%	2	40,225	4.05%	0
2014	1,297	0.12%	0	10,845	0.96%	0	763,804	67.79%	9	141,902	12.59%	2				5,311	0.47%	0	1,326	0.12%	0	141,150	12.53%	2	18,120	1.61%	0
2009	2,727	0.24%	0	5,768	0.52%	0	822,166	73.84%	11	96,850	8.70%	1				8,239	0.74%	0	1,674	0.15%	0				15,986	1.44%	0
2004	10,428	0.79%	0	14,274	1.08%	0	1,083,254	81.83%	15	72,444	5.47%	1	5,687	0.43%	0	14,503	1.10%	0	3,827	0.29%	0				15,029	1.14%	0
1999	8,878	0.68%	0	18,574	1.42%	0	1,052,895	80.53%	15	48,665	3.72%	1	31,072	2.38%	0	11,774	0.90%	0	5,929	0.45%	0				15,106	1.16%	0
1994	24,233	1.53%					1,325,559	83.46%		5,826	0.37%		160,479	10.10%		3,901	0.25%		7,155	0.45%					49,175	3.10%	

=== Detailed ===
==== 2024 ====
Results of the regional ballot for the North West in the 2024 general election held on 29 May 2024:

Party/Candidate	Votes	%	Seats	+/–
African National Congress	515,832	58.28	8	–1
Economic Freedom Fighters	153,496	17.34	3	+2
Democratic Alliance	114,629	12.95	2	0
Freedom Front Plus	24,487	2.77	0	0
uMkhonto weSizwe	18,176	2.05	0	New
ActionSA	13,871	1.57	0	New
Patriotic Alliance	8,055	0.91	0	0
Forum for Service Delivery	5,344	0.60	0	0
United Africans Transformation	4,642	0.52	0	New
Build One South Africa	3,828	0.43	0	New
African Christian Democratic Party	3,765	0.43	0	0
Rise Mzansi	3,169	0.36	0	New
United Democratic Movement	2,118	0.24	0	0
African Transformation Movement	1,366	0.15	0	0
Pan Africanist Congress of Azania	1,327	0.15	0	0
Azanian People's Organisation	1,309	0.15	0	0
Congress of the People	1,267	0.14	0	0
Inkatha Freedom Party	1,204	0.14	0	0
Economic Liberators Forum South Africa	1,090	0.12	0	New
United Independent Movement	788	0.09	0	New
Al Jama-ah	744	0.08	0	0
African People's Convention	691	0.08	0	0
Alliance of Citizens for Change	652	0.07	0	New
Africa Restoration Alliance	473	0.05	0	New
Good	466	0.05	0	0
Sizwe Ummah Nation	395	0.04	0	New
South African Royal Kingdoms Organization	366	0.04	0	New
South African Rainbow Alliance	325	0.04	0	New
Citizans	248	0.03	0	New
Organic Humanity Movement	231	0.03	0	New
Africa Africans Reclaim	226	0.03	0	New
African Movement Congress	221	0.02	0	New
Free Democrats	154	0.02	0	0
People's Movement for Change	129	0.01	0	New
Total	885,084	100.00	13	–
Valid votes	885,084	98.69		
Invalid/blank votes	11,792	1.31		
Total votes	896,876	100.00		
Registered voters/turnout	1,768,576	50.71		

The following candidates were elected.

Name	Party
Betty Diale	EFF
Betty Kegakilwe	ANC
Gaolatlhe Kgabo	ANC
Dakota Legoete	ANC
Sharon Letlape	EFF
Joe McGluwa	DA
Mothusi Montwedi	EFF
Itiseng Morolong	ANC
Sello Seitlholo	DA
Masello Senne	ANC
Nombiselo Sompa-Masiu	ANC
Kerileng Tlhong	ANC
Noble Tshotetsi	ANC

==== 2019 ====
Results of the national ballot for the North West in the 2019 general election held on 8 May 2019:

Party	Votes	%	Seats	+/–
African National Congress	633,223	63.69	9	0
Economic Freedom Fighters	169,880	17.09	2	0
Democratic Alliance	112,417	11.31	2	0
Freedom Front Plus	40,225	4.05	0	0
African Christian Democratic Party	4,084	0.41	0	0
African Independent Congress	4,076	0.41	0	0
United Democratic Movement	3,420	0.34	0	0
Forum for Service Delivery	2,868	0.29	0	New
Congress of the People	2,809	0.28	0	0
African Transformation Movement	2,535	0.25	0	New
African Security Congress	1,831	0.18	0	New
Socialist Revolutionary Workers Party	1,736	0.17	0	New
Agang South Africa	1,418	0.14	0	0
Afrikan Alliance of Social Democrats	1,270	0.13	0	New
Good	1,094	0.11	0	New
Pan Africanist Congress of Azania	1,007	0.10	0	0
Inkatha Freedom Party	955	0.10	0	0
African People's Convention	953	0.10	0	0
Azanian People's Organisation	768	0.08	0	0
Black First Land First	749	0.08	0	New
Economic Emancipation Forum	580	0.06	0	New
Al Jama-ah	482	0.05	0	0
National Freedom Party	481	0.05	0	0
African Covenant	466	0.05	0	New
Women Forward	465	0.05	0	0
Front National	439	0.04	0	0
Christian Political Movement	365	0.04	0	New
Capitalist Party of South Africa	347	0.03	0	New
Alliance for Transformation for All	339	0.03	0	New
African Congress of Democrats	280	0.03	0	New
African Content Movement	270	0.03	0	New
International Revelation Congress	247	0.02	0	New
Democratic Liberal Congress	242	0.02	0	New
African Democratic Change	232	0.02	0	New
African Renaissance Unity Party	207	0.02	0	New
Compatriots of South Africa	182	0.02	0	New
Power of Africans Unity	170	0.02	0	New
Patriotic Alliance	160	0.02	0	0
Free Democrats	154	0.02	0	New
Land Party	118	0.01	0	New
Better Residents Association	113	0.01	0	0
Minority Front	109	0.01	0	0
Independent Civic Organisation of South Africa	91	0.01	0	0
National People's Front	91	0.01	0	New
People's Revolutionary Movement	84	0.01	0	New
National People's Ambassadors	74	0.01	0	New
South African Maintenance and Estate Beneficiaries Association	60	0.01	0	New
South African National Congress of Traditional Authorities	54	0.01	0	New
Total	994,220	100.00	13	–
Valid votes	994,220	98.22		
Invalid/blank votes	18,030	1.78		
Total votes	1,012,250	100.00		
Registered voters/turnout	1,702,728	59.45		

The following candidates were elected: Nombuyiselo Adoons (ANC), Godrich Gardee (EFF), Sibusiso Kula (ANC), Tidimalo Legwase (ANC), Jane Manganye (ANC), Philemon Mapulane (ANC), Leigh-Ann Mathys (EFF), Ezekiel Molala (ANC), Asnath Molekwa (ANC), Kenneth Morolong (ANC), Cheryl Phillips (DA), Sello Seitlholo (DA) and Bridgette Tlhomelang (ANC).

==== 2014 ====
Results of the 2014 general election held on 7 May 2014:

Party		Votes	%	Seats
African National Congress	ANC	763,804	67.79%	9
Democratic Alliance	DA	141,902	12.59%	2
Economic Freedom Fighters	EFF	141,150	12.53%	2
Freedom Front Plus	VF+	18,120	1.61%	0
United Democratic Movement	UDM	10,845	0.96%	0
United Christian Democratic Party	UCDP	10,109	0.90%	0
Congress of the People	COPE	8,540	0.76%	0
African Independent Congress	AIC	8,421	0.75%	0
African Christian Democratic Party	ACDP	5,311	0.47%	0
Agang South Africa	AGANG SA	4,690	0.42%	0
African People's Convention	APC	3,321	0.29%	0
Azanian People's Organisation	AZAPO	1,708	0.15%	0
National Freedom Party	NFP	1,519	0.13%	0
Inkatha Freedom Party	IFP	1,326	0.12%	0
Pan Africanist Congress of Azania	PAC	1,297	0.12%	0
Workers and Socialist Party	WASP	818	0.07%	0
Al Jama-ah		667	0.06%	0
Front National	FN	414	0.04%	0
Patriotic Alliance	PA	408	0.04%	0
Pan Africanist Movement	PAM	305	0.03%	0
Ubuntu Party	UBUNTU	291	0.03%	0
United Congress	UNICO	261	0.02%	0
First Nation Liberation Alliance	FINLA	234	0.02%	0
Keep It Straight and Simple Party	KISS	226	0.02%	0
Independent Civic Organisation of South Africa	ICOSA	224	0.02%	0
Minority Front	MF	221	0.02%	0
Bushbuckridge Residents Association	BRA	213	0.02%	0
Kingdom Governance Movement	KGM	206	0.02%	0
Peoples Alliance	PAL	140	0.01%	0
Valid Votes		1,126,691	100.00%	13
Rejected Votes		21,095	1.84%	
Total Polled		1,147,786	68.76%	
Registered Electors		1,669,349		

The following candidates were elected: Hellen BoikHutso Kekana (ANC), Veronica Mafolo (ANC), Johanna Maluleke (ANC), Philly Mapulane (ANC), Abinaar Modikela Matlhoko (EFF), Samuel Gaaesi Mmusi (ANC), Pinky Mokoto (ANC), Itumeleng Mosala (ANC), Abram Molefe Mudau (ANC), Girly Nobanda (ANC), Winston Rabotapi (DA), Primrose Sonti (EFF) and Johanna Steenkamp (DA).

==== 2009 ====
Results of the 2009 general election held on 22 April 2009:

Party		Votes	%	Seats
African National Congress	ANC	822,166	73.84%	11
Democratic Alliance	DA	96,850	8.70%	1
Congress of the People	COPE	93,898	8.43%	1
United Christian Democratic Party	UCDP	43,855	3.94%	1
Freedom Front Plus	VF+	15,986	1.44%	0
African Christian Democratic Party	ACDP	8,239	0.74%	0
United Democratic Movement	UDM	5,768	0.52%	0
Independent Democrats	ID	4,891	0.44%	0
Movement Democratic Party	MDP	4,405	0.40%	0
African People's Convention	APC	3,742	0.34%	0
Azanian People's Organisation	AZAPO	2,797	0.25%	0
Pan Africanist Congress of Azania	PAC	2,727	0.24%	0
Inkatha Freedom Party	IFP	1,674	0.15%	0
National Democratic Convention	NADECO	940	0.08%	0
Great Kongress of South Africa	GKSA	835	0.07%	0
Al Jama-ah		689	0.06%	0
United Independent Front	UIF	639	0.06%	0
South African Democratic Congress	SADECO	503	0.05%	0
Alliance of Free Democrats	AFD	490	0.04%	0
Christian Democratic Alliance	CDA	481	0.04%	0
New Vision Party	NVP	463	0.04%	0
Pan Africanist Movement	PAM	338	0.03%	0
Women Forward	WF	320	0.03%	0
Minority Front	MF	278	0.02%	0
A Party		243	0.02%	0
Keep It Straight and Simple Party	KISS	194	0.02%	0
Valid Votes		1,113,411	100.00%	14
Rejected Votes		22,290	1.96%	
Total Polled		1,135,701	72.60%	
Registered Electors		1,564,357		

The following candidates were elected: Celia Ditshetelo (UCDP), George Lekgetho (ANC), Veronica Mafolo (ANC), Johanna Maluleke (ANC), Jane Manganye (ANC), Kabelo Mataboge (ANC), Samuel Gaaesi Mmusi (ANC), Paul Bushy Mnguni (COPE), Wendy Nelson (ANC), Molefi Sefularo (ANC), Morwesi Johannah Segale-Diswai (ANC), Joseph Selau (ANC), Juanita Terblanche (DA) and Sussana Tsebe (ANC).

==== 2004 ====
Results of the 2004 general election held on 14 April 2004:

Party		Votes	%	Seats
African National Congress	ANC	1,083,254	81.83%	15
United Christian Democratic Party	UCDP	86,476	6.53%	1
Democratic Alliance	DA	72,444	5.47%	1
Freedom Front Plus	VF+	15,029	1.14%	0
African Christian Democratic Party	ACDP	14,503	1.10%	0
United Democratic Movement	UDM	14,274	1.08%	0
Pan Africanist Congress of Azania	PAC	10,428	0.79%	0
Independent Democrats	ID	6,645	0.50%	0
New National Party	NNP	5,687	0.43%	0
Inkatha Freedom Party	IFP	3,827	0.29%	0
Azanian People's Organisation	AZAPO	3,624	0.27%	0
Socialist Party of Azania	SOPA	1,307	0.10%	0
National Action	NA	1,194	0.09%	0
Employment Movement for South Africa	EMSA	1,158	0.09%	0
Christian Democratic Party	CDP	927	0.07%	0
United Front	UF	753	0.06%	0
Peace and Justice Congress	PJC	719	0.05%	0
The Organisation Party	TOP	595	0.04%	0
Keep It Straight and Simple Party	KISS	349	0.03%	0
New Labour Party		297	0.02%	0
Minority Front	MF	271	0.02%	0
Valid Votes		1,323,761	100.00%	17
Rejected Votes		30,202	2.23%	
Total Polled		1,353,963	77.39%	
Registered Electors		1,749,529		

The following candidates were elected: Tuelo Anthony (ANC), Paul Ditshetelo (UCDP), China Dodovu (ANC), Rebecca Kasienyane (ANC), Kgotso Khumalo (ANC), Sam Louw (ANC), Sophie Maine (ANC), Wendy Makgate (ANC), Lorna Maloney (ANC), Nono Maloyi (ANC), Monako Moatshe (ANC), Pinky Mokoto (ANC), Christopher Thabo Molefe (ANC), Solly Rasmeni (ANC), Windvoel Skhosana (ANC), Enver Surty (ANC) and Paul Swart (DA).

==== 1999 ====
Results of the 1999 general election held on 2 June 1999:

Party		Votes	%	Seats
African National Congress	ANC	1,052,895	80.53%	15
United Christian Democratic Party	UCDP	97,755	7.48%	1
Democratic Party	DP	48,665	3.72%	1
New National Party	NNP	31,072	2.38%	0
United Democratic Movement	UDM	18,574	1.42%	0
Freedom Front	VFFF	15,106	1.16%	0
African Christian Democratic Party	ACDP	11,774	0.90%	0
Pan Africanist Congress of Azania	PAC	8,878	0.68%	0
Federal Alliance	FA	7,376	0.56%	0
Afrikaner Eenheidsbeweging	AEB	6,130	0.47%	0
Inkatha Freedom Party	IFP	5,929	0.45%	0
Azanian People's Organisation	AZAPO	1,426	0.11%	0
Socialist Party of Azania	SOPA	750	0.06%	0
Abolition of Income Tax and Usury Party	AITUP	520	0.04%	0
Minority Front	MF	362	0.03%	0
Government by the People Green Party	GPGP	320	0.02%	0
Valid Votes		1,307,532	100.00%	17
Rejected Votes		26,326	1.97%	
Total Polled		1,333,858	87.31%	
Registered Electors		1,527,672		

==== 1994 ====
Results of the national ballot for the North West in the 1994 general election held between 26 and 29 April 1994:

Party	Votes	%	Seats
African National Congress	1,325,559	83.46	13
National Party	160,479	10.10	2
Freedom Front	49,175	3.10	0
Pan Africanist Congress of Azania	24,233	1.53	0
Inkatha Freedom Party	7,155	0.45	0
Democratic Party	5,826	0.37	0
African Christian Democratic Party	3,901	0.25	0
African Moderates Congress Party	3,244	0.20	0
Dikwankwetla Party of South Africa	2,088	0.13	0
Africa Muslim Party	1,386	0.09	0
Sport Organisation for Collective Contributions and Equal Rights	959	0.06	0
Minority Front	772	0.05	0
African Democratic Movement	701	0.04	0
Ximoko Progressive Party	578	0.04	0
Women's Rights Peace Party	568	0.04	0
Keep It Straight and Simple Party	548	0.03	0
Federal Party	500	0.03	0
Workers' List Party	331	0.02	0
Luso-South African Party	252	0.02	0
Total	1,588,255	100.00	15
Valid votes	1,588,255	98.77	
Invalid/blank votes	19,822	1.23	
Total votes	1,608,077	100.00	
