= Asnath Molekwa =

South African politician

Member of the National Assembly of South Africa
- In office 22 May 2019 – 28 May 2024
- Constituency: North West

Personal details
- Born: 15 February 1967 (age 59) Mphebatho, Transvaal Province, South Africa
- Party: African National Congress
- Education: University of South Africa
- Occupation: Member of Parliament
- Profession: Politician
- Committees: Portfolio Committee on Home Affairs; Portfolio Committee on Police

Mathedi Asnath Molekwa (born 15 February 1967) is a South African politician who was a Member of the National Assembly of South Africa from the North West, serving from 2019 until 2024. Molekwa is the former speaker of the Bojanala Platinum District Municipality in the North West Province. She is a member of the African National Congress.

== Early life and education ==
Molekwa was born on 15 February 1967 in Mphebatho (Wynanskraal). She attended Tlhaloganyo Primary School and Maubane Middle School before matriculating from Nchaupe High School. She studied Local Government Management and Administration at the University of South Africa as well as Project Planning and Management. She is currently studying for a Bachelor of Arts degree in Public Administration.

== Political career ==
Molekwa joined the National Union of Metalworkers of South Africa (NUMSA) in the 1989 when she worked for the Nissan factory in Rosslyn. After the African National Congress was unbanned in 1990, she was a member of team tasked with building structures for the party in Moretele. Molekwa was also a member of the African National Congress Youth League in the 1990s and served as the first regional secretary of the African National Congress Women's League in the Eastern Region of the North West Province for three terms.

She was a member of the coordinating structure tasked with the amalgamation of the ANC's Eastern Region as well as the Rustenburg, Madikwe and Mankwe Regions. Molekwa was also a member of the Municipal Facilitating Committee. In 1994 she was appointed by the United Nations to host local government workshops in communities in the North West Province. Molekwa worked as a party agent for the ANC during the first multiracial elections in 1994 and the following year, she was appointed a coordinator responsible for voter registration during that year's municipal elections. Molekwa was elected as an ANC councillor in the Eastern District Council in the North West Province and was appointed chief whip of the ANC caucus. Molekwa was also a member of NOWELOGA (North West Local Government Association), which later formed part of the South African Local Government Association (SALGA). During the 1995–2000 council term, she was the chairperson of the district's infrastructure portfolio committee.

In 2000 Molekwa was elected as an ANC councillor in the Moretele Local Municipality and appointed as an executive committee member in the municipality. From 1998 to 2003, she was chair of the Moretele District Welfare Forum. She later served on the advisory board of the Department of Agriculture between 2003 and 2007. In 2004 Molekwa was elected as the regional secretary of the ANC's Bojanala region. She was elected mayor of the Moretele local municipality in 2006 and became chairperson of SALGA. That same year, Molekwa was re-elected as regional secretary.

Molekwa was elected as a member of the ANC provincial executive committee (PEC) at the party's provincial conference in 2008. After that, she became chair of the Social Transformation Committee and participated in the national sub-committee of the ANC. She was also an elected member of the women's league provincial executive committee.

In 2011, Molekwa was re-elected as an ANC PEC member. At the first meeting of the PEC after the conference, she was elected to the provincial working committee. Molekwa was appointed to be chairperson of the Economic Transformation Subcommittee. In the 2011 municipal election, Molekwa was re-elected as a councillor and was appointed chief whip of the Bojanala Platinum District Municipality. In 2016 she was elected speaker of the municipality.

== Parliamentary career ==
On 17 March 2019, Molekwa was announced as an ANC parliamentary candidate for the parliamentary election on 8 May 2019. She was seventh on the ANC's list in the North West, behind Itiseng Morolong, Philemon Mapulane, Nombuyiselo Adoons, Jane Manganye, Ezekiel Molala, Tidimalo Legwase and was elected as one of nine ANC MPs from the North West. In June 2019, she became a member of the Portfolio Committee on Home Affairs and the Portfolio Committee on Police.

She did not stand in the 2024 general election and left parliament.
