= Tshiamo =

- Gender: feminine or masculine
- Language: Tswana

Origin
- Meaning: Bless with divine, righteousness or goodness
- Region of origin: Africa

Other names
- Nickname: Tshia

Tshiamo is a Tswana given name meaning "bless with divine, righteousness or goodness". Notable people with the name include:

- Tshiamo Modisane (born 1990), South African author, activist and television personality
- Tshiamo Tshotetsi (born 1988), South African politician
