= Matshidiso Botswe =

South African politician

Matshidiso Botswe MPL

Member of the North West Provincial Legislature
- Incumbent
- Assumed office 22 May 2019

Personal details
- Born: Matshidiso Mathews Botswe
- Party: Economic Freedom Fighters
- Occupation: Member of the Provincial Legislature
- Profession: Politician

Matshidiso Mathews Botswe is a South African politician who has been the provincial chairperson of the Economic Freedom Fighters since his election in September 2018. He has been serving as a Member of the North West Provincial Legislature since May 2019. Prior to serving in the legislature, he was a councillor in the Ditsobotla Local Municipality.

In February 2020, Botswe was physically assaulted while he was being escorted out of the chamber for disrupting premier Job Mokgoro's State of the Province Address.
