= Senne =

Senne may refer to:

== Places ==
- Senne (Germany), a natural region of Germany
- Senne, a district of Bielefeld, Germany
- Senne (river), a river of Belgium
- Senné (disambiguation), places in Slovakia

== People with the name ==
- Yōkō Senne, a 13th-century Japanese monk
- Aaron Senne (born 1987), American baseball player from Florida
- Masello Senne, South African politician
- Mike Senne (born 1964), American baseball player from Arizona
- René Le Senne (1882–1954), French philosopher and psychologist
- Senne Lammens (born 2002), Belgian footballer who plays as a goalkeeper for Manchester United
- Senne Leysen (born 1996), Belgian cyclist
- Senne Lynen (born 1999), Belgian footballer who plays as a midfielder for Union SG
- Senne Rouffaer (1925–2006), Belgian actor and film director
