= Jóhni Steenkamp =

South African politician

Jóhni Steenkamp MPL
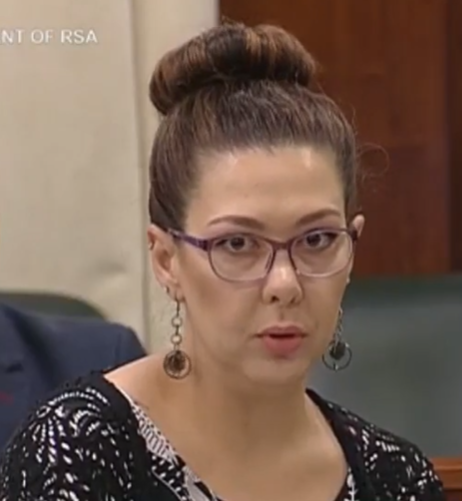
- Steenkamp in 2019

Member of the North West Provincial Legislature
- Incumbent
- Assumed office 14 June 2024

Member of the National Assembly of South Africa
- In office 21 May 2014 – 7 May 2019

Personal details
- Born: 13 February 1987 (age 39)
- Party: Democratic Alliance
- Education: Potchefstroom Gimnasium
- Alma mater: North-West University
- Profession: Politician

Johanna Steenkamp (born 13 February 1987) is a South African politician who has been a member of the North West Provincial Legislature since June 2024, representing the Democratic Alliance. She had previously served as a councillor in the JB Marks Local Municipality from 2021 until 2024 where she was DA caucus leader. Steenkamp was a Member of Parliament between 2014 and 2019.

== Early life and education ==
Steenkamp was born on 13 February 1987 and grew up in Potchefstroom in the present-day North West Province of South Africa. She matriculated from Potchefstroom Gimnasium and graduated from North-West University in Potchefstroom.

== Political career ==
Steenkamp joined the Democratic Alliance in 2009 and worked at the party's provincial headquarters as a media manager. In the 2011 municipal elections, she was elected as the ward councillor for ward 22 in the Tlokwe Local Municipality centered around Potchefstroom. When the DA briefly gained control of the municipality in 2012 and 2013, Steenkamp served in the mayoral committee, initially as the member responsible for the transversal issues portfolio and later for the housing portfolio.

Steenkamp was elected to represent the DA in the National Assembly of South Africa in the 2014 general election. After the election, shhe was appointed to serve on the Portfolio Committee on Environmental Affairs. During a debate on Youth Day in the National Assembly, Steenkamp called for the leadership of the National Youth Development to be dismissed, which the NYDA subsequently condemned in a statement.

In October 2015, Steenkamp was promoted to Shadow Minister of Environmental Affairs by the DA Leader Mmusi Maimane. Steenkamp was placed low on the DA's candidate lists for the 2019 general election and was not elected to return to Parliament following the election.

Steenkamp was elected the ward councillor for ward 7 in the JB Marks Local Municipality in the 2021 municipal election. The DA caucus on the council elected her as caucus leader. She was later elected to the North West Provincial Legislature in the 2024 provincial election. The DA caucus leader in the legislature, Freddy Sonakile appointed her as chief whip of the party's caucus and spokesperson for both the economic development, environment, conservation, and tourism and agriculture and rural development portfolios, respectively.

In February 2026, Steenkamp said that there was "no clear or transparent process" about hiking the entrance fees at provincial nature reserves in the North West. She described the 2026 State of the Province Address held later that month as heavily focused on the municipal portfolio and further said that "you can see it’s an election year we are in."
