= Kerileng =

Kerileng is a given name and surname. Notable people with the name include:

- Kerileng Tlhong (fl. from 2024), South African politician
- Kelebogile Kerileng (fl. from 2019), South African politician

== See also ==
- Kering
