= Dakota Legoete =

South African politician

Provincial Secretary of the African National Congress in North West
- In office 25 November 2013 – February 2018
- Deputy: Gordon Kegakilwe; Sussana Dantjie
- Preceded by: Kabelo Mataboge
- Succeeded by: Louis Diremelo

Personal details
- Born: Molefi David Legoete; 1 June 1972 (age 53)
- Citizenship: South Africa
- Party: African National Congress

Molefi David "Dakota" Legoete (born 1 June 1972) is a South African politician and political strategist from the North West. He represents the African National Congress (ANC) in the National Assembly, where he is chairperson of the Portfolio Committee on Defence and Military Veterans. He has been a member of the ANC National Executive Committee since December 2017.

A former local councillor in the North West, Legoete was the North West ANC's Provincial Secretary from 2013 to 2017, serving under his ally Supra Mahumapelo. He worked full-time at the ANC's headquarters at Luthuli House before he was elected to the National Assembly in the May 2024 general election.

== Political career ==
Born on 1 June 1972, Legoete is from South Africa's North West Province. He was formerly the municipal manager at Tswaing Local Municipality in Sannieshof in the North West, but was suspended in 2009 when he was implicated in a corruption scandal. He was still challenging his suspension in court in 2011 when he was elected as a local councillor in Tlokwe Local Municipality in the area around Potchefstroom. He represented the African National Congress (ANC) in the municipal council and by 2013 was the party's Chief Whip in the council. He was also reportedly considered as an ANC mayoral candidate in the North West.

=== ANC Provincial Secretary: 2013–2017 ===
On 25 November 2013, Legoete was elected as the Provincial Secretary of the ANC's North West branch. He replaced Kabelo Mataboge, who had been suspended from the party, and won the position in a vote against acting secretary Gordon Kegakilwe, who received 169 votes against Legoete's 205. Legoete, unlike Kegakilwe, was viewed as a political ally of Supra Mahumapelo, the incumbent ANC Provincial Chairperson. The Provincial Secretary position was a full-time post based out of the ANC's provincial headquarters at Mphekwa House in Mafikeng and Legoete vacated his seat in the Tlokwe council in order to take it up.

As the ANC's next regular provincial elective conference approached, it was rumoured that Kegakilwe would again stand against Legoete for the Provincial Secretary post, on a slate of candidates aligned to Nono Maloyi rather than to Mahumapelo. However, when the conference was held in February 2015, Legoete was re-elected unopposed to a full four-year term in the office.

In 2017, Legoete, along with Mahumapelo, reportedly became involved in national ANC politics as a key ally of Nkosazana Dlamini-Zuma, who stood unsuccessfully for the ANC presidency at the party's 54th National Conference. According to the Daily Maverick, as Provincial Secretary Legoete was instrumental in obstructing the efforts of Dlamini-Zuma's opponent, Cyril Ramaphosa, to campaign in the North West.

=== Luthuli House: 2018–2024 ===
At the ANC's 54th National Conference, which was held in December 2017 and which elected Ramaphosa as party president, Legoete was elected for the first time to the party's National Executive Committee (NEC). In February 2018, the ANC announced that Legoete would be employed full-time at Luthuli House, the party's national headquarters in Johannesburg, as deputy head of the organising department; in that capacity he deputised Senzo Mchunu and worked closely with the office of ANC Secretary-General Ace Magashule. He vacated the ANC's North West secretariat to take up the national party position.

Legoete had reportedly been Magashule's preferred choice for Mchunu's position, while Mchunu's appointment was pushed by supporters of Ramaphosa. Indeed, Legoete became known as a prominent political ally of Magashule, including during Magashule's efforts to contest his suspension from the ANC in 2021.

In 2019, during the ANC's campaign in the upcoming general election, Legoete acted as ANC spokesperson when Pule Mabe and Zizi Kodwa "stepped aside" simultaneously to address separate sexual misconduct allegations against them. In July of that year, he was also appointed to a national task team, convened by Tandi Mahambehlala, that was assembled to lead the ANC Youth League after the league's elected leadership corps was disbanded.

Although Mchunu was replaced by Nomvula Mokonyane by 2020, Legoete remained in the deputy head of organising role until the end of the NEC's term in December 2022. In that month, at the ANC's 55th National Conference, Legoete was re-elected to a second five-year term on the NEC; by number of votes received, he was ranked 61st of the 80 candidates elected, receiving 1,111 votes across the 4,029 ballots cast in total. In March 2024 he returned to Luthuli House, now employed in the ANC's communications unit under spokeswoman Mahlengi Bhengu.

=== National Assembly: 2024–present ===
In the May 2024 general election, Legoete was elected to an ANC seat in the National Assembly, ranked third on the party list for the North West region. He was elected to chair the assembly's Portfolio Committee on Defence and Military Veterans.
