= Nonceba Mhlauli =

South African politician (born 1990)

The Honourable Nonceba Mhlauli MP

Deputy Minister in the Presidency
- Incumbent
- Assumed office 30 June 2024 Serving with Kenneth Morolong
- President: Cyril Ramaphosa
- Minister: Khumbudzo Ntshavheni
- Preceded by: Nomasonto Motaung

Member of the National Assembly
- Incumbent
- Assumed office 14 June 2024

Personal details
- Born: 3 June 1990 (age 36) Upington, Cape Province; South Africa
- Party: African National Congress
- Education: Rhodes University

Nonceba Bianca Mhlauli (born 3 June 1990) is a South African politician and communications strategist. She is currently serving as Deputy Minister in the Presidency since June 2024. A member of the African National Congress (ANC), she was elected to her first term in the National Assembly in the May 2024 general election. She rose to political prominence as the interim leader of the ANC Youth League between April 2021 and March 2023.

Born in Upington, Northern Cape, Mhlauli was a student activist at Rhodes University, where she joined the national leadership of the South African Students Congress. Before entering frontline politics, she served as spokesperson to Minister in the Presidency Jackson Mthembu and as spokesperson of the ANC's parliamentary caucus. She was elected to a five-year term on the ANC National Executive Committee in December 2022.

== Early life and education ==
Born on 3 June 1990, Mhlauli is from the small town of Upington in the Cape Province (now the Northern Cape). Her home language is Xhosa. Her family were supporters of the African National Congress (ANC), and her grandfather and uncle had been members of Umkhonto we Sizwe during apartheid. Influenced by family members, Mhlauli joined the Congress of South African Students and ANC Youth League as a 15-year-old high school student.

After matriculating in 2007, she moved to Grahamstown to study journalism and political studies at Rhodes University. She graduated with a Bachelor of Arts in 2011 and Honours in 2012. Though she entered the workforce thereafter, she continued her postgraduate studies at Rhodes and in 2016 completed a Master of Arts in social policy and African language studies. Her thesis was about the effect of language on access to public healthcare in South Africa, with particular focus on primary healthcare in Grahamstown and Cofimvaba.

While a student at Rhodes, Mhlauli became increasingly involved in youth politics through the South African Students Congress (SASCO). She joined SASCO during her first year at the university, and as a postgraduate student she was a member of its national executive committee between 2011 and 2015. She also served as national communications coordinator for SASCO from 2013 to 2015. At the same time, she was among a group of students who launched the ANC Youth League's branch at Rhodes.

== Career as ANC staffer ==
In 2013, after graduating with her Honours degree, Mhlauli moved to Cape Town to work as a junior policy researcher for the Southern African Clothing and Textile Workers' Union (SACTWU), an affiliate of the Congress of South African Trade Unions. She worked at SACTWU until 2014, when she took up a position in the Western Cape Provincial Parliament as a researcher for the ANC caucus. In 2016, she was transferred to the ANC's parliamentary caucus in the National Assembly, the lower house of the South African Parliament. Working closely with the office of the Chief Whip of the Majority Party, she entered as a media liaison officer and was promoted to spokesperson and head of communications for the caucus in 2017.

After the May 2019 general election, the outgoing Chief Whip, Jackson Mthembu, was appointed to the cabinet as Minister in the Presidency. Mhlauli followed him to the Union Buildings, becoming his spokesperson. In that role she pioneered the virtual press conferences held by the Presidency and national executive during the COVID-19 pandemic.

== ANC Youth League convenor: 2021–2023 ==
On 8 April 2021, Mhlauli was appointed as national convenor of the National Youth Task Team (NYTT), a 35-member interim leadership corps which was mandated to lead the ANC Youth League until the league could hold new leadership elections. She worked alongside Joy Maimela, who was appointed as coordinator of the NYTT. Mhlauli and Maimela's NYTT replaced a former task team, led by Tandi Mahambehlala as convenor and Sibongile Besani as coordinator, which had been appointed after Collen Maine's leadership corps was disbanded in 2019; Mahambehlala and Besani had been trying unsuccessfully since then to hold an elective conference. In subsequent weeks Mhlauli argued that the ANC Youth League was in disarray because of "extreme factionalism and that sort of cultish leadership where if you disagree, you get disbanded", a phenomenon that she said had been intensified by ANC leaders' habit of using the league "as a pocket knife in the factional battles of the mother body".

=== 55th National Conference ===
Mhlauli was ANC Youth League coordinator during the run-up to the ANC's 55th National Conference in December 2022, which involved a leadership contest between President Cyril Ramaphosa, the incumbent, and his rival Zweli Mkhize. Mhlauli was viewed as among Ramaphosa's staunchest supporters, described variously as the leader of "the Ramaphosa faction" in the NYTT and as "among the key campaigners" for Ramaphosa's re-election. However, in November 2022, Mhaluli's NYTT overruled her, deciding to endorse Mkhize for the ANC presidency. Hours after the announcement, Mhlauli Tweeted a photo of Ramaphosa captioned "Mongameli" ("president"). She was criticised for this apparent deviation from the ANC's principle of democratic centralism, but she continued to express public and unapologetic support for Ramaphosa.

When the 55th National Conference was held at Nasrec in December 2022, Ramaphosa was elected to a second term as ANC president. Mhlauli herself attended the conference, and she was elected to a five-year term as a member of the National Executive Committee. By number of votes received, she was ranked 55th of the 80 ordinary members elected, receiving 1,168 votes across 4,029 ballots. She was one of only three members under the age of 35. In the aftermath of the conference she was also elected to the ANC's National Working Committee.

=== Youth League conference ===
Meanwhile, in 2023, the ANC Youth League continued preparations for its own elective conference. Mhlauli had long been viewed as a possible candidate for the Youth League presidency, and in 2022 she had overtly launched a campaign for her election to the leadership. Indeed, the Mail & Guardian said that she was regarded as having been "groomed for the position" by Ramaphosa's allies, such as Jackson Mthembu. However, after Mhlauli was elected to the National Executive Committee of the mainstream ANC, she withdrew from contention for the league presidency, saying that it "would not make political sense" for her to continue her campaign. Instead she launched a campaign for young people such as herself to be appointed to Ramaphosa's cabinet; in an interview with the Daily Maverick, she said that Ramaphosa's putatively young ministers, such as Ronald Lamola, did not provide genuine youth representation.

Though the NYTT had been mandated to hold an elective conference by March 2022, it had not succeeded by March 2023. In that month, the National Working Committee of the mainstream ANC announced that Mhlauli's NYTT would be disbanded and replaced by a new task team. Mhlauli was replaced as convenor by Xola Nqola.

== National government: 2024–present ==
Ahead of the May 2024 general election, Mhlauli stood as an ANC candidate, ranked 22nd on the party's national list. She was elected to a seat in the National Assembly, and on 30 June President Ramaphosa announced her appointment as Deputy Minister in the Presidency. In that capacity she deputises Minister Khumbudzo Ntshavheni and serves alongside Deputy Minister Kenneth Morolong.
