= Mmoloki Cwaile =

South African politician

Mmoloki Cwaile MPL

Member of the North West Executive Council for Cooperative Governance, Human Settlements and Traditional Affairs
- In office 21 November 2020 – 11 August 2021; On leave: 5 August – 11 August
- Premier: Job Mokgoro
- Preceded by: Gordon Kegakilwe
- Succeeded by: Lenah Miga

Member of the North West Provincial Legislature
- Incumbent
- Assumed office 5 February 2019

Personal details
- Born: Mmoloki Saviour Cwaile
- Citizenship: South Africa
- Party: African National Congress
- Profession: Politician

Mmoloki Saviour Cwaile is a South African politician who served as the North West MEC for Cooperative Governance, Human Settlements and Traditional Affairs from November 2020 to August 2021. A member of the African National Congress, he has been a Member of the North West Provincial Legislature since February 2019. Cwaile had previously served as the chairperson of the Portfolio Committee on Premier, Finance, Cooperative Governance, Human Settlement and Traditional Affairs in the legislature.

== Political career ==
Cwaile is a member of the African National Congress. His early school life was dominated by political activism during Bophuthatswana era whilst he was a learner at Batlhaping High School. His active participation in revolts that became defining characteristical feature for the schools at his locality was not unnoticed and was not left unattended by police. He served as a member of the ANC and SACP provincial executive committees.

He served as Provincial Executive Committee member of both ANC, NW and SACP, Moses Kotane Province (NW). He is former ANCYL branch Chairperson at Ward 67, Joe Slovo Branch in Greater Johannesburg Region, and has led ANCYL as varying capacities and led ANC ward 13, Greater Taung ANC at different positions. He also served as SACP member and attended political school at COSATU House. He is a former NEHAWU branch Chairperson at Kagisano Molopo Subregion, and presided as Convener for COSATU-Local at Kagisano Molopo sub region leading to launching of COSATU - local in the local municipality. He was SRC President at Mmabatho Nursing College for three terms and served in the Broad Transformation Forum (BTF) for transformation of Higher Education. He was chair of the NW ANC Political Education subcommittee before he chaired the International Relations subcommittee. He served as member of ANC NEC International Relations subcommittee. He has chair of PACCA in Northern and a member of the Food Security Provincial Committee in Northern Cape.

== Career in public service ==
He has served as manager in the public service for more than 16 years when he was suspended and dismissed from NW Department of Health as director responsible for the Health Technology and Facility Management after painful engagements in his battles against the then NW Health Head of Department which caused unrest in the NW and eventual arrest of the Head of Department whose case was heard at High Court of North West when Thapelo Galeboe, nicknamed "Pitbul" - the then JW Nkosi (Dr RSM region) YCL, SA District Chairperson opened criminal charges against the then Head of Department of Health, NW. He argued his case as a case of occupational detriment arising from disclosures he made against the then HOD which he argued was protected disclosure and that the law was binding on his part to make the disclosure on all wrong doings under his watch.

== Academic profile ==
He was trained as a professional nurse at Mmabatho Nursing college in Mahikeng after a brief year period as a private teacher at Gabobediwe High School at Buxton area of Greater Taung. He has completed matric in 1992 at Batlhaping High School at Greater Taung where he was active in debates, softball sport and was also Head of the Learners at School and their representative delegate in school management Committee. He has four (4) year Diploma in Comprehensive Nursing and Midwifery from Mmabatho Nursing College, formerly Bophuthatswana Nursing College. He has studied Post Graduate Diploma in Management (PGDM) at North West University (UNW); Bachelor of Arts Honours Degree (BAHons) in Public Management from University of Stellenbosch (US). He enrolled for Masters Degree in Governance and Political Transformation with University of Free State (UoFS). He holds multiple NQF level 6 and short courses on varying fields including Health Policy Analysis and Epidemiology and Control of TB/HIV/AIDS/Malaria and STI in the era of Art from University of Western Cape (UWC), Enterprise Risk Management plus Workplace Monitoring and Evaluation from University of Pretoria (UP), Organizational Development and Project Management from Regenesys Business School and many others.

He was a participant in USAIDS funded International Leadership programme in USA and was part of the South African delegates for benchmarking at Uganda on HIV/AIDS and attended China Executive Leadership Academy of Pudong in China (CELAP).

== Work history ==
He worked as professional nurse at Johannesburg Hospital, clinical nurse practitioner at Milpark hospital in Johannesburg and coordinator of mental health programme at Kagisano Molopo subregion of Dr RSM in NW before becoming Health Area Manager at Maquassi Hills subregion of Dr Kk region in NW and Deputy Director as Northern Cape Provincial Programme Manager responsible for HIV/Aids programme at Department of Social Development. In 2008 he became Chief Executive Officer (CEO) of Greater Taung District Hospital, the largest district hospital in NW until in 2013 when he became the District Director for all district hospitals in Dr Ruth Segomotsi Mompati District (Dr RSM) and was later transferred to the NW Health provincial office to lead Hospital Revitalization, Health Technology and Facility Management programmes.

== ANC Provincial Executive: 2015–2018 ==
In 2015, Cwaile was elected to the Provincial Executive Committee of the ANC in the North West, then under the leadership of Provincial Chairperson Supra Mahumapelo – though Cwaile personally was among Mahumapelo's most prominent detractors. In 2017, ahead of the ANC's 54th National Conference, Cwaile deviated from Mahumapelo's position in openly campaigning for winning presidential candidate Cyril Ramaphosa; according to City Press, he was the only member of the Provincial Executive Committee to do so. In mid-2018, when Mahumapelo was forced to resign as North West Premier, Ramaphosa's supporters were rumoured to support Cwaile as a possible successor.

The Provincial Executive Committee was disbanded later in 2018 due to the political fallout from Mahumapelo's resignation, but the National Executive Committee appointed Cwaile to the interim task team that led the provincial party until fresh elections were held in 2022.

== Legislative career: 2019–present ==
On 5 February 2019, Cwaile was sworn in as a Member of the North West Provincial Legislature. He filled a casual vacancy arising from the death of Ndleleni Duma. He was elected to his first full term in the legislature in May 2019, ranked fourth on the ANC's provincial party list. In June 2019, he was elected to chair the legislature's Portfolio Committee on Premier, Finance, Cooperative Governance, Human Settlement and Traditional Affairs. He also served as Chairperson of Committees.

On 21 November 2020, Premier Job Mokgoro appointed Cwaile as Member of the Executive Council (MEC) for the North West Department of Cooperative Governance, Human Settlements and Traditional Affairs. He replaced Gordon Kegakilwe, who had died of COVID-19-related illness in July.

Premier Mokgoro placed Cwaile on leave on 5 August 2021 but did not share his reasons for doing so. The opposition Democratic Alliance speculated that Mokgoro and Cwaile had disagreed over the extension of a controversial procurement contract in the project management unit; Cwaile later confirmed this. On 13 August, Mokgoro announced that he had fired Cwaile, with effect from 11 August; he was replaced by Lenah Miga. However, Cwaile remained an ordinary Member of the Provincial Legislature.
