= Saliva Molapisi =

South African politician (born 1967)

Saliva Molapisi MPL

Member of the North West Executive Council for Cooperative Governance, Human Settlement and Traditional Affairs
- Incumbent
- Assumed office 21 June 2024
- Premier: Lazarus Mokgosi
- Preceded by: Nono Maloyi

Member of the North West Executive Council for Public Works and Roads
- In office December 2018 – 14 June 2024
- Premier: Job Mokgoro; Bushy Maape
- Preceded by: Johanna Maluleke
- Succeeded by: Elizabeth Mokua

Member of the North West Executive Council for Community Safety and Transport Management
- In office May 2014 – May 2016
- Premier: Supra Mahumapelo
- Preceded by: Position established
- Succeeded by: Mpho Motlhabane

Personal details
- Party: African National Congress

Gaoage Oageng Molapisi, (known as Saliva Molapisi; born 28 February 1967), is a South African politician who is currently serving as the North West's Member of the Executive Council (MEC) for Cooperative Governance, Human Settlement and Traditional Affairs since June 2024. He previously served as MEC for Community Safety and Transport Management from 2014 to 2016, before spending two years as an ordinary Member of the North West Provincial Legislature from 2016 to 2018. In December 2018, he returned to the Executive Council as the MEC for Public Works and Roads He is a member of the African National Congress (ANC).

Molapisi is from the region that, in the post-apartheid era, became the Dr Kenneth Kaunda District Municipality. He was first appointed to the North West Executive Council after the May 2014 general election, in which he was ranked 22nd on the ANC's party list; newly elected Premier Supra Mahumapelo appointed him MEC for Community Safety and Transport Management. However, less than two years later, on 8 May 2016, Mahumapelo fired him. He remained an ordinary Member of the North West Provincial Legislature.

He returned to the Executive Council under Mahumapelo's successor, Job Mokgoro, who appointed him MEC for Department of Public Works and Roads in a reshuffle announced on 6 December 2018. After the 2019 general election, in which Molapisi was ranked 19th on the ANC's party list, Mokgoro reappointed him to the same portfolio in his new Executive Council. In August 2022, Molapisi was elected to the Provincial Executive Committee of the ANC's branch in the North West.

Following the 2024 general election, Molapisi became the MEC for Cooperative Governance, Human Settlement and Traditional Affairs in newly elected premier Lazarus Mokgosi's Executive Council.
