= Jack Bloom =

South African politician

Jack Bloom MP

Deputy Minister of Water and Sanitation
- Incumbent
- Assumed office 1 July 2026
- President: Cyril Ramaphosa
- Preceded by: Sello Seitlholo

Member of the National Assembly of South Africa
- Incumbent
- Assumed office 30 June 2026

Leader of the Opposition in the Gauteng Provincial Legislature
- In office March 2011 – May 2014

Member of the Gauteng Provincial Legislature
- In office December 2007 – April 2009
- In office 1994 – 30 June 2026

Personal details
- Born: Jack Bloom; 1961 (age 64–65) Doornfontein, Johannesburg, South Africa
- Party: Democratic Alliance (2000–present)
- Other political affiliations: Democratic Party (Until 2003)
- Education: Athlone Boys' High School
- Alma mater: University of the Witwatersrand (BA, BA(Hons), MBA); University of South Africa (PhD)

Jack Bloom is a South African politician who has been the Deputy Minister of Water and Sanitation and a Member of the National Assembly of South Africa for the Democratic Alliance.

He was the longest-serving Member of the Gauteng Provincial Legislature, having been elected as a Democratic Party member in 1994 and re-elected since for the Democratic Alliance. Bloom was the DA caucus leader and the Leader of the Opposition in the provincial legislature from December 2007 to April 2009 and again from March 2011 until May 2014. During his final years in the provincial legislature, he was the party's shadow health MEC.

== Background ==
Bloom was born in Doornfontein in Johannesburg in 1961. He attended Athlone Boys' High School. He obtained BA and Honours degrees in industrial psychology from the University of the Witwatersrand. He also holds an MBA from the university. In June 2025, he graduated from the University of South Africa with a PhD in Religious Studies.

Bloom is Jewish.

== Political career ==
Bloom was a volunteer worker for the Progressive Federal Party in the early 1980s. In 1991, he was elected as the ward councillor for Highlands North as a member of the Democratic Party. He was the youngest DP member in the City of Johannesburg council. In 1994, Bloom was elected to the Gauteng Provincial Legislature as one of five DP members. Bloom was then appointed chief whip of the DP caucus. He was re-elected to the provincial legislature in 1999.

In 2000, the Democratic Alliance was formed when the DP merged with the New National Party and the Federal Alliance. Bloom was given dual-party membership and officially became a DA representative during the 2003 floor-crossing period. He was re-elected in 2004 as the DA's support grew. In December 2007, the DA caucus elected him caucus leader and he then became leader of the opposition in the provincial legislature.

Bloom was re-elected in 2009. In March 2011, he once again became DA caucus leader and leader of the opposition. Prior to the 2014 general election, he applied to be the DA's Gauteng premier candidate. The DA selected Mmusi Maimane. Bloom was re-elected to another term in the provincial legislature in the election. After the election, John Moodey was elected leader of the DA GPL caucus. Bloom was then appointed Shadow MEC for Health.

Bloom was re-elected to the legislature in 2019 and remained as shadow health MEC. He was re-elected to the legislature in the 2024 provincial election and continued serving as the DA's health spokesperson.

== National government ==
On 17 June 2026, DA leader Geordin Hill-Lewis wrote to President Cyril Ramaphosa, request that he appoint Bloom as the Deputy Minister of Water and Sanitation, succeeding Sello Seitlholo. He delivered his farewell address to the legislature on 25 June 2026 and resigned his seat. On 30 June 2026, Ramaphosa acceded to Hill-Lewis's request and conducted a cabinet reshuffle, appointing Bloom to the role. He was sworn in the following day. Bloom filled Mathew Cuthbert's seat in the National Assembly, who resigned to become the DA's chief executive officer.
