= Lenah Miga =

South African politician

Deputy Speaker of the North West Provincial Legislature
- In office 24 January 2023 – 28 May 2024
- Preceded by: Viola Motsumi
- Succeeded by: Tshepo Khoza

Member of the North West Provincial Legislature
- In office September 2020 – May 2024

Member of the North West Executive Council for Cooperative Governance, Human Settlement and Traditional Affairs
- In office August 2021 – November 2022
- Premier: Job Mokgoro; Bushy Maape
- Preceded by: Mmoloki Cwaile
- Succeeded by: Nono Maloyi

Personal details
- Citizenship: South Africa
- Party: African National Congress

Nomtsama Lenah Miga is a South African politician who served as a Member of the North West Provincial Legislature from September 2020 until May 2024. From January 2024 until May 2024, she served as the deputy speaker of the provincial legislature. She was formerly the North West's Member of the Executive Council (MEC) for Cooperative Governance, Human Settlement and Traditional Affairs from August 2021 until November 2022, when she was fired by Bushy Maape.

Miga is a member of the African National Congress (ANC) and by 2020 had served as the Provincial Secretary of the ANC Women's League in the North West; she was also formerly the Executive Mayor of the Mahikeng Local Municipality. In September 2020, she was sworn in to the North West Provincial Legislature, filling a casual vacancy created by the death of Gordon Kegakilwe – she had been ranked 23rd on the ANC's party list in the 2019 general election and therefore had not initially won election to a legislative seat.

In August 2021, she was appointed to the North West Executive Council by Job Mokgoro, then the Premier of the North West; she succeeded Mmoloki Cwaile as MEC for Cooperative Governance, Human Settlements and Traditional Affairs. The opposition Democratic Alliance objected to her appointment because of what it characterised as her poor record as Mahikeng mayor. While MEC, in August 2022, Miga ran unsuccessfully for election as Provincial Treasurer of the ANC's North West branch; she lost in a vote to Sello Lehari, earning 280 votes to Lehari's 380. Three months later, on 21 November 2022, she was fired from the Executive Council and replaced by Nono Maloyi in a cabinet reshuffle announced by Bushy Maape, who had succeeded Mokgoro as Premier. During a sitting of the legislature on 24 January 2023, Miga was elected as the deputy speaker of the provincial legislature, succeeding Viola Motsumi.
