= Molapisi =

Molapisi is a surname of Southern African origin. Notable people with the surname include:

- Saliva Molapisi (fl. 2014–present), South African politician
- Tlhalosang Molapisi (born 1973), Motswana sprinter
