= Mpho Motlhabane =

South African politician

Member of the North West Executive Council for Community Safety and Transport Management
- In office 8 May 2016 – 7 May 2019
- Premier: Supra Mahumapelo; Job Mokgoro
- Preceded by: Saliva Molapisi
- Succeeded by: Sello Lehari

Personal details
- Citizenship: South Africa
- Party: African National Congress
- Other political affiliations: South African Communist Party

Mokgantshang Nicholas "Mpho" Motlhabane is a South African politician who served as the North West's Member of the Executive Council (MEC) for Community Safety and Transport Management from May 2016 until May 2019, when he failed to gain re-election to the North West Provincial Legislature. He is a member of the African National Congress (ANC) and of the South African Communist Party (SACP).

== Legislative career ==
In the 2014 general election, Motlhabane was ranked 30th on the ANC's provincial party list and was not immediately elected to a seat in the North West Provincial Legislature, but he was later sworn in to fill a casual vacancy in the ANC caucus. On 8 May 2016, North West Premier Supra Mahumapelo appointed him to the North West Executive Council as MEC for Community Safety and Transport Management. He replaced Saliva Molapisi and at the time of his appointment was the chairperson of the North West branch of the SACP.

He was retained in the Community Safety and Transport Management portfolio by Job Mokgoro, who succeeded Mahumapelo as Premier in 2018, but he was ranked 24th on the ANC's provincial party list in the 2019 general election and therefore was not re-elected to his legislative seat.
