= Veronica Mafolo =

South African former politician and convicted criminal

Member of the National Assembly of South Africa
- In office 6 May 2009 – 7 May 2019

Personal details
- Party: African National Congress

Mapule Veronica Mafolo is a South African former politician and convicted criminal who served as a Member of the National Assembly of South Africa from 2009 to 2019, representing the African National Congress.

Mafolo and her co-accused Thabo Freddy Phutiyagae were arrested on 12 January 2018 for the theft of two Bonsmara calves from a farm in Schweizer-Reneke. She was released on a warning after a court appearance on 15 January 2018. She and Phutiyagae were convicted of the theft and sentenced to three years in prison each by the Schweizer-Reneke Regional Court on 8 May 2023.

== Parliamentary career ==
A member of the African National Congress, Mafolo was elected to the National Assembly of South Africa in the 2009 general election on the party's North West regional to national list. Having entered parliament, she was appointed to serve on the Joint Standing Committee on Defence as well as the Portfolio Committee on Social Development. After her re-election in the 2014 general election, she was named to the Portfolio Committee on Mineral Resources and the Portfolio Committee on Telecommunications and Postal Services. Mafolo was not placed on any ANC candidate list for the 2019 general election and left parliament as a result.

== Stock theft and criminal conviction ==
On 12 January 2018, Mafolo and Thabo Freddy Phutiyagae were arrested by the Vryburg Stock Theft Unit for the alleged stock theft of two Bonsmara calves from a farm in Schweizer-Reneke. The farmer had noticed fresh car tracks on his farm in the early hours of the morning and then found that the two calves were missing. He then alerted his brother who reported the matter to police. The farmer was then called to the Vryburg Auction Kraals where he identified the calves. Mafolo pleaded with the farmer not to lay charges against her because it would damage her reputation as a Member of Parliament.

She and Phutiyagae with an unidentified male appeared in the Schweizer-Reneke Magistrate's Court on 15 January 2018 where she was released on a warning while Phutiyagae and the other man were released on R800 bail. The matter was postponed to 15 February 2018.

Mafolo and Phutiyagae were sentenced to three years in prison in the Schweizer-Reneke Regional Court on 8 May 2023 for the theft of the two calves.
