= Thabo Mmutle =

South African politician

Member of the South African National Assembly
- In office 22 May 2019 – 28 May 2024

Personal details
- Born: Thabo Nelson Mmutle
- Party: African National Congress
- Profession: Politician

Thabo Nelson Mmutle is a South African former Member of Parliament for the African National Congress. He became an MP at the 2019 general election. Mmutle is a former member of the national executive committee (NEC) of the African National Congress Youth League.

== Parliamentary career ==
At the 2019 election Mmutle stood for the National Assembly for the African National Congress. He was ranked 108th on the ANC's national candidate list, which was high enough for him to enter the National Assembly at the May election. Since becoming an MP, Mmutle has sat on the Portfolio Committee on Defence and Military Veterans and the Joint Standing Committee on Defence.

Mmutle, who serves as whip of the ANC's study group on defence and military veterans, condemned the theft of 19 automatic rifles from the South African National Defence Force's Lyttelton Tek military base in December 2019, saying: "It is horrific to imagine the safety of the public when there are dangerous warfare weapons on the streets, as this poses a serious safety risk to citizens and leaves much to be desired about the security of the republic."

In September 2020, Mmutle defended Defence minister Nosiviwe Mapisa-Nqakula's controversial trip to Zimbabwe with an ANC delegation, saying it was "to conduct important work in support of human rights".

Mmutle did not stand for re-election in the 2024 general election.

== Political positions ==
Mmutle is a staunch supporter of ANC secretary-general Ace Magashule and former ANC president Jacob Zuma. In October 2020, he was one of the organisers of the "Hands off Magashule" campaign. He said that there was "no reason" for the ANC to delay a national general council (NGC) meeting amid the COVID-19 pandemic. Mmutle supports the nationalisation of the South African Reserve Bank as well as land expropriation with compensation.

In March 2021, Mmutle was one of several ANC MPs who supported Magashule's position that the ANC should not vote with the opposition to establish an inquiry to investigate Public Protector Busisiwe Mkhwebane's fitness to hold office. The National Assembly approved the establishment of an ad-hoc committee to determine Mkhwebane's fitness to hold office on 16 March 2021 with 168 out of the 230 ANC MPs voting with the opposition.
