= Khulani Hadebe =

South African politician

Khulani Elphas Richard Hadebe is a South African politician of the African National Congress and member of the National Assembly of South Africa since 16 February 2024. He replaced Alice Mthembu who died.

== See also ==
- List of National Assembly members of the 27th Parliament of South Africa
