= Florence Tito =

South African politician

Florence Tito MP
- Tito in 2026

Member of the National Assembly
- Incumbent
- Assumed office 22 May 2019

Personal details
- Party: Economic Freedom Fighters
- Profession: Politician

Lorato Florence Tito is a South African politician and a Member of the South African National Assembly. Tito is a member of the Economic Freedom Fighters.

== Biography ==
Tito matriculated from Tetlanyo Secondary School in Kimberley, Northern Cape. She holds diplomas in marketing and public administration and management.

Prior to her election to parliament, she was an EFF councillor in the Sol Plaatje Local Municipality and the Frances Baard District Municipality.

Tito stood as an EFF parliamentary candidate in the 2019 national elections, and was subsequently elected to the National Assembly and sworn in on 22 May 2019. Since becoming an MP, Tito has been a member of the Portfolio Committee on Home Affairs.

Tito was re-elected to the National Assembly at the 2024 general election.
