= Freddy Sonakile =

South African politician

Freddy Sonakile MPL

Provincial Chairperson of the Democratic Alliance in the North West
- Incumbent
- Assumed office 29 July 2023
- Deputy: Hendriette van Huyssteen
- Preceded by: Luan Synders

Deputy Provincial Leader of the Democratic Alliance in the North West
- In office 21 November 2020 – 29 July 2023
- Leader: Leon Basson
- Preceded by: Leon Basson
- Succeeded by: Cornel Dryer

Member of the North West Provincial Legislature
- Incumbent
- Assumed office 22 May 2019

Personal details
- Born: Bafana Freddy Sonakile; Zamdela, Sasolburg, South African
- Party: Democratic Alliance
- Education: North-West University (LLB)
- Occupation: Member of the Provincial Legislature
- Profession: Advocate; Politician

Bafana Freddy Sonakile is a South African advocate and politician who has been a Member of the North West Provincial Legislature for the Democratic Alliance since May 2019. He is the leader of the party's caucus in the legislature and the party's provincial chairperson. He had previously served as chief whip of the DA caucus in the legislature and as the deputy provincial leader of the party. Prior to serving in the provincial legislature, Sonakile had worked as a legal advisor at the provincial legislature.

== Early life and education ==
Sonakile was born in Zamdela, Sasolburg in the Orange Free State. He was raised by his mother. Sonakile obtained an LLB degree from the North-West University. He was then employed as a legal advisor at the North West Provincial Legislature. In 2018, Sonakile was one of the Mail & Guardian's 200 Young South Africans.

== Political career ==
Sonakile is a member of the Democratic Alliance. After the 2019 provincial election, he returned to the provincial legislature, this time as a representative of the DA. He is one of four party representatives. The party's caucus elected him chief whip.

On 21 November 2020, Sonakile was elected deputy provincial leader of the DA in the North West, defeating Sello Seitlholo.

Sonakile was elected Leader of the DA caucus in the North West Legislature on 1 December 2021, succeeding Winston Rabotapi.

At the DA Provincial Conference on 29 July 2023, Sonakile was elected provincial chairperson as Cornel Dryer succeeded him as deputy provincial leader.
