= Kenny Morolong =

South African politician (born 1982)

The Honourable Kenneth Morolong MP

Deputy Minister in the Presidency
- Incumbent
- Assumed office 7 March 2023 Serving with Nomasonto Motaung (2023–2024) and Nonceba Mhlauli (since 2024)
- President: Cyril Ramaphosa
- Minister: Khumbudzo Ntshavheni

Member of the National Assembly
- Incumbent
- Assumed office 22 May 2019
- Constituency: North West

Personal details
- Born: Itiseng Kenneth Morolong; 17 February 1982 (age 44) Schweizer-Reneke, South Africa
- Party: African National Congress
- Profession: Politician

Itiseng Kenneth Morolong (born 17 February 1982) is a South African politician from the North West Province. A member of the African National Congress (ANC), he has been the Deputy Minister in the Presidency since March 2023. He rose to prominence as a youth activist in the Congress of South African Students and ANC Youth League before he was elected to the National Assembly in May 2019.

== Early life and political career ==
Morolong was born on 17 February 1982 in Ipelengeng, a township outside Schweizer-Reneke in the present-day North West Province. He became politically engaged as a teenager: he was president of the local branch of the African National Congress (ANC) Young Pioneers from 1991 to 1994, and he went on to serve as the provincial chairperson of the Congress of South African Students (COSAS) in the North West from 1998 to 2001. In 2001, he stood unsuccessfully for the position of national president of COSAS, losing to Julius Malema. From 2001 to 2002, he was the coordinator of the regional task team that led the ANC Youth League's regional branch in Bophirima.

Over the next decade, Morolong served stints as an administrator in the ANC Parliamentary Constituency Office from 2005 to 2008, as chief executive officer of IKM Trading Enterprise from 2008 to 2009, and as an administrator in the office of the Member of the Executive Council for Sports, Arts and Culture in 2010. During his period, in July 2008, Morolong was involved in violent factional clashes in the North West ANC, precipitated by provincial secretary Supra Mahumapelo's attempt to suspend him from the party; Morolong reportedly beat two party members with a spanner, while a group of his supporters were arrested for torching ANC regional offices.

In 2011, Morolong was elected to the Provincial Executive Committee of the North West ANC, which in turn selected him as its spokesperson. By 2013, the Mail & Guardian reported that he had sided with Gordon Kegakilwe over Supra Mahumapelo in the factional contest that split the Provincial Executive.

== National Youth Development Agency: 2013–2019 ==
In March 2013, on the recommendation of Parliament, President Jacob Zuma appointed Morolong to a three-year term as deputy chairman of the board of the National Youth Development Agency (NDYA). In that capacity he deputised board chairman Yershen Pillay. Both Pillay and Morolong were accused by critics of abusing NYDA's resources for their private political purposes – in Morolong's case, to support his unsuccessful bid to be elected as ANC Youth League president. Morolong had long been viewed as a possible candidate for leadership of the league, possibly as running mate to Ronald Lamola, but in 2015 Collen Maine was elected unopposed to the presidency.

Upon the conclusion of the NYDA board's three-year term, Morolong stood for reappointment but was dropped from the parliamentary shortlist, ostensibly on the grounds that he lacked the requisite tertiary qualification. He challenged his exclusion, with Lamola representing him as his attorney, and the parliamentary process was rerun. In May 2017, President Zuma announced that Morolong's term as a board member would be renewed for three years, though he became an ordinary board member, with Bavelile Hlongwa replacing him as deputy chairperson. He served on the NYDA board until his ascension to Parliament two years later.

== National Assembly: 2019–present ==
In the May 2019 general election, Morolong stood as a parliamentary candidate, ranked first on the ANC's party list in the North West. He was elected to a seat in the National Assembly, where he served in the Standing Committee on Finance. Midway through the parliamentary term, in January 2023, the North West ANC served Morolong with internal disciplinary charges for bringing the ANC into disrepute in the aftermath of the electoral conference that elected Nono Maloyi as provincial chairperson; Morolong had publicly questioned the integrity of the electoral process.

In a cabinet reshuffle announced on 6 March 2023, President Cyril Ramaphosa appointed Morolong as Deputy Minister in the Presidency; in that capacity he served under Minister Khumbudzo Ntshavheni and alongside second deputy minister Sonto Motaung. After the next general election in May 2024, Morolong was re-elected to the National Assembly and retained in his deputy ministerial post; Ntshavheni was also retained, but Motaung was replaced by Nonceba Mhlauli.
