= Tshiamo Tshotetsi =

South African politician (born 1988)

The Honourable Tshiamo Tshotetsi

Member of the National Assembly

Assembly Member for North West
- Incumbent
- Assumed office 14 June 2024

Personal details
- Born: Noble Tshiamo Tshotetsi; 26 October 1988 (age 37)
- Party: African National Congress

Noble Tshiamo Tshotetsi (born 26 October 1988), also spelled Tshiamo Tsotetsi, is a South African politician from the North West who has represented the African National Congress (ANC) in the National Assembly since June 2024. He was elected to his seat in the May 2024 general election, ranked first on the ANC's party list for the North West region.

== Youth politics ==
Tshotetsi rose to prominence as national secretary-general of the Congress of South African Students (COSAS). In that capacity, while addressing a rally of mineworkers near Brits in May 2014, he described Thuli Madonsela, then the Public Protector, as "that woman with the big, ugly nose". His remarks, reflecting the unpopularity of Madonsela's recently published report on the Nkandla scandal, were criticized by the ANC, and the Sunday Times labelled Tshotetsi as its Mampara of the Week. The COSAS leadership said that Tshotetsi had been speaking on behalf of the organisation in his criticism of Madonsela, but it disowned his personal remark about her appearance.

After leaving COSAS, Tshotetsi entered the provincial leadership of the ANC Youth League in the North West, first as its provincial spokesperson and then as its provincial secretary. He stood unsuccessfully for election to the North West Provincial Legislature in May 2019.
