= Kelebogile Kerileng =

South African politician

Kelebogile Kerileng MPL

Member of the North West Provincial Legislature
- Incumbent
- Assumed office 22 May 2019

Personal details
- Party: Economic Freedom Fighters
- Occupation: Member of the Provincial Legislature
- Profession: Politician

Kelebogile Emily Kerileng is a South African politician currently serving as a Member of the North West Provincial Legislature for the Economic Freedom Fighters. She was elected to the legislature in May 2019.
