= Viola Motsumi =

South African politician (1983)

Viola Motsumi MPL

Member of the North West Executive Council for Education
- Incumbent
- Assumed office 7 December 2022
- Premier: Lazarus Mokgosi; Bushy Maape
- Preceded by: Wendy Matsemela

Deputy Speaker of the North West Provincial Legislature
- In office 22 May 2019 – 7 December 2022
- Preceded by: Jane Manganye
- Succeeded by: Lenah Miga

Member of the North West Provincial Legislature
- Incumbent
- Assumed office 22 May 2019

Personal details
- Born: Ntsetsao Viola Motsumi; 2 January 1983 (age 43)
- Party: African National Congress
- Education: Mmabatho High School
- Alma mater: North-West University
- Profession: Politician

Ntsetsao Viola Motsumi (born 2 January 1983) is a South African politician. In May 2019, she was elected deputy speaker of the North West Provincial Legislature and consequently became the youngest deputy speaker in South Africa. In November 2022, she was appointed as the Member of the Executive Council for Education in the North West province. Motsumi is a member of the African National Congress.

== Early life and education ==
Motsumi was born in the village Madibe-Makgabane. She matriculated from Mmabatho High School in 2001 and went on to study at North-West University. From the university, she holds a B.Sc. degree in physics, a postgraduate certificate in education, and a BScHons degree in microbiology. She obtained an MBA from the university in 2019. Motsumi worked as a teacher at Mmabatho High between 2008 and 2015.

== Political career ==
In May 2019, she was elected to the North West Provincial Legislature as an African National Congress representative. She was sworn in as an MPL on 22 May. On the same day, she was elected deputy speaker, succeeding Jane Manganye. At the time, Motsumi was the youngest deputy speaker in South Africa.

On 22 November 2022, premier Bushy Maape conducted a reshuffle of his executive council which saw Motsumi being appointed as Member of the Executive Council for Education. She resigned as deputy speaker on 7 December 2022 and became the Education MEC, succeeding Wendy Matsemela, who resigned from the legislature.

In June 2024, Motsumi was reappointed as Education MEC by the newly elected premier Lazarus Mokgosi.

Political offices
Preceded by Jane Manganye	Deputy Speaker of the North West Provincial Legislature; 2019–2022	Succeeded by Lenah Miga
Preceded by Wendy Matsemela	Member of the North West Executive Council for Education; 2022–present	Succeeded by Incumbent
