= Kabelo Mataboge =

South African politician

Kabelo Mataboge MPL

Member of the North West Provincial Legislature
- Incumbent
- Assumed office 22 May 2019

Provincial Secretary of the African National Congress in the North West
- In office February 2011 – May 2013
- Deputy: Gordon Kegakilwe
- Chairperson: Supra Mahumapelo
- Preceded by: Supra Mahumapelo
- Succeeded by: Dakota Legoete

Personal details
- Citizenship: South Africa
- Party: African National Congress

Daniel Kabelo Mataboge is a South African politician who has represented the African National Congress (ANC) in the North West Provincial Legislature since 2019. He was formerly the Provincial Secretary of the ANC's North West branch from 2011 to 2013; in 2013, after a hostile fallout with Supra Mahumapelo, he was suspended from the party for two years.

== ANC Provincial Secretary ==
Mataboge is from the Bojanala region of present-day North West province. He was formerly an active member of the ANC Youth League and by 2011 he was a member of the league's National Executive Committee. In February 2011, he was elected Provincial Secretary of the North West ANC, defeating Zakes Molale in a vote. In the full-time secretarial role, Mataboge served with his deputy, Gordon Kegakilwe, and with Supra Mahumapelo, who had been elected as ANC Provincial Chairperson at the same conference. Mataboge ran for the position on a slate aligned to Mahumapelo, reportedly as the result of a deal done between them.

=== Mangaung conference ===
In 2012, as the ANC's 53rd National Conference approached, the North West ANC became increasingly divided in a power struggle between Mataboge and Mahumapelo. Mahumapelo was a staunch supporter of Jacob Zuma, the incumbent President of South Africa, who was running for re-election to the ANC presidency at the conference. By contrast, Mataboge was aligned to ANC Deputy President Kgalema Motlanthe, North West Premier Thandi Modise, and their "forces for change".

In the early hours of 30 November 2012, an anonymous gunman shot at Mataboge fourteen times while he exited his car outside his home in Mafikeng. He was not injured, but the media and ANC sources viewed the incident as a politically motivated assassination attempt. At the time of the shooting he was returning home from preparations for a party congress, scheduled for 30 November, at which the provincial party would nominate the delegates who would represent them at the national conference. In early December, the outcomes of the nomination conference were challenged in court by a group of North West ANC members, who applied to block pro-Zuma delegates from attending the national conference; the Business Day said that Mataboge was "associated with" the group that brought the court application.

Several days before the national conference, on 13 December 2012, the ANC's Provincial Executive Committee – then dominated by Mahumapelo's supporters – suspended Mataboge from his party office, pending internal disciplinary proceedings against him. When the national conference opened on 16 December, Mataboge was barred from entering as a delegate; Zuma and his slate of candidates prevailed in the elections. Mataboge's suspension also barred him from participating in other party activities until his disciplinary case was concluded.

=== Suspension ===
When the ANC's disciplinary process began, Mataboge was charged with "prejudicing the integrity and repute of the ANC by impeding its activities and undermining its effectiveness as an organisation". He pled guilty, admitting that he had been aware – and had omitted to inform the ANC – that aggrieved members would attempt to challenge the nomination conference outcomes in court; he also admitted that he ought to have foreseen that his conduct in this respect could have prevented North West delegates from attending the national conference.

The party's disciplinary proceedings against Mataboge were concluded on 24 May 2013. The ANC National Disciplinary Committee, chaired by Derek Hanekom, believed that Mataboge was "capable of rehabilitation"; by way of a sentence, it suspended his party membership for three years and instructed him to vacate his position as Provincial Secretary. Kegakilwe, as Mataboge's former deputy, took over his duties in an acting capacity until November 2013, when Dakota Legoete was elected to replace him permanently.

However, Mataboge's suspension was lifted before the end of his three-year sentence. In October 2014, after Mahumapelo had been elected Premier of the North West, the ANC's provincial leadership said that it had begun to prepare for Mataboge's return, given that he had displayed "good conduct" and "remorse" during his suspension to date. The ANC's top national leadership, with the support of the provincial leadership, subsequently applied to the National Disciplinary Committee to have Mataboge's suspension lifted early. In May 2015, the committee announced that he could return to party activities as soon as he paid his party membership fee.

== North West Provincial Legislature ==
In the 2019 general election, Mataboge was ranked first on the ANC's provincial party list for the North West, and he was elected to a seat in the North West Provincial Legislature. In January 2023, the legislature elected him to serve as its Chairperson of Committees.

== Personal life ==
Mataboge is married and has children.
