= Brandon Pillay =

South African politician

Member of the National Assembly of South Africa
- In office 27 January 2021 – 28 May 2024
- Preceded by: Loyiso Mpumlwana
- Constituency: National List

Personal details
- Born: Kavilan Brandon Pillay; 1981 or 1982 (age 44–45) Chatsworth, Natal Province, South Africa
- Party: African National Congress
- Education: Chatsworth Secondary School
- Alma mater: MANCOSA (BPA, Hon); University of KwaZulu-Natal (MPA)
- Occupation: Politician

Kavilan Brandon Pillay (born 1981 or 1982) is a South African politician from Chatsworth, KwaZulu-Natal. From January 2021 until May 2024, he was a Member of the National Assembly of South Africa representing the African National Congress.

== Early life and education ==
Pillay was born into an Indian family in Chatsworth. He attended Chatsworth Secondary School. He graduated from MANCOSA with a Bachelor of Public Administration and later with a Honours degree in public administration. Pillay earned a Master of Public Administration at the University of KwaZulu-Natal in 2021.

== Politics ==
His political activism started in his teenage years, having been influenced by his late father. He became an activist for the Bayview Flat Residents Association and later the African National Congress. Pillay was a student leader, Students' Representative Council president, ward councillor for ward 69 (Chatsworth) from 2011 to 2016, convenor and chairperson of ward 69 ANC branch, secretary of the Lenny Naidu branch and convenor of the regional executive committee's sub-committee on local government, legislature and governance. He also served as the convenor of the youth desk of the South African National Civic Organization. Pillay is currently a member of the ANC's regional task team.

Prior to being sworn in as a Member of Parliament, Pillay had been the chairperson of both the Bayview Flats Residents Association and the Bayview community policing forum, as well as a grant manager for the eThekwini Metropolitan Municipality.

=== Parliament ===
Following the death of Advocate Loyiso Mpumlwana in December 2020, the ANC selected Pillay to take up his seat in the National Assembly. Pillay was sworn in on 27 January 2021 during a virtual ceremony at the KwaZulu-Natal Provincial Legislature amid the COVID-19 pandemic in South Africa. Since entering parliament, he has served on the Portfolio Committee on Home Affairs.

Pillay did not stand for a full term in the 2024 general election and retired from politics at the election.
