= Johanna Maluleke =

South African politician (died 2021)

Member of the National Assembly of South Africa
- In office 7 May 2009 – 3 June 2016

Personal details
- Died: 11 January 2021

Johanna Mmule Maluleke (died 11 January 2021) was a South African politician from North West. A member of South Africa's African National Congress, she served as a Member of the National Assembly of South Africa from 2009 until 2016, when she resigned to join the North West Provincial Legislature.

Maluleke died in 2021.
