= Sussana Dantjie =

South African politician (born 1971)

The Honourable Sussana Dantjie MPL

Speaker of the North West Provincial Legislature
- In office 21 May 2014 – 28 May 2024
- Preceded by: Supra Mahumapelo
- Succeeded by: Desbo Mohono

Member of the North West Provincial Legislature
- Incumbent
- Assumed office 21 May 2014

Member of the National Assembly of South Africa
- In office 6 May 2009 – 6 May 2014

Personal details
- Born: Sussana Rebecca Tsebe; 2 August 1971 (age 55)
- Party: African National Congress
- Spouse: Lungile Dantjie
- Profession: Politician

Sussana Rebecca Dantjie (née Tsebe) (born 2 August 1971) is a South African politician who served as the Speaker of the North West Provincial Legislature from May 2014 until May 2024. She was a Member of the National Assembly of South Africa from May 2009 to May 2014. Dantjie is a member of the African National Congress.

== Political career ==
Dantjie is a member of the African National Congress. She was elected to the National Assembly of South Africa in April 2009. On 6 May, she was sworn in as an MP. During her parliamentary tenure, she sat on both the Portfolio Committee on Communications and the Standing Committee on Auditor General.

Ahead of the May 2014 general election, Dantjie was placed 12th on the party's candidate list to the North West Provincial Legislature. She was elected and was sworn in as an MPL on 21 May. She was also elected as the speaker of the provincial legislature, replacing Supra Mahumapelo, who was elected the provincial premier. Jane Manganye was elected as her deputy.

Dantjie was re-elected to the provincial legislature in May 2019 and remained as speaker. Manganye was elected to Parliament. The provincial ANC selected Viola Motsumi as their candidate for deputy speaker, and she was elected on 22 May.

== Personal life ==
Dantjie is married to Lungile Dantjie.

Political offices
Preceded by Supra Mahumapelo	Speaker of the North West Provincial Legislature; 2014–2024	Succeeded by Desbo Mohono
