= Pinky Mokoto =

South African politician

Member of the National Assembly
- In office 21 May 2014 – 7 May 2019
- Constituency: North West
- In office 23 April 2004 – 13 April 2009
- Constituency: North West

Mayor of Ngaka Modiri Molema
- In office September 2009 – May 2011
- Preceded by: Themba Ngwabeni
- Succeeded by: Phaladi Saku

Personal details
- Born: 25 February 1973 (age 53) Mafikeng, Transvaal; South Africa
- Party: African National Congress

Nthibane Rebecca "Pinky" Mokoto (born 25 February 1973) is a South African politician from the North West. She represented the African National Congress (ANC) in the National Assembly for two non-consecutive terms from 2004 to 2009 and from 2014 to 2019. In the interim, she was Mayor of the North West's Ngaka Modiri Molema District Municipality from 2009 to 2011.

Mokoto was a member of the ANC's National Executive Committee from 2007 to 2012. She had formerly been a member of the national executive of the ANC Youth League.

== Early life and career ==
Mokoto was born on 25 February 1973 in Mafikeng in the former Western Transvaal, where she grew up. She worked for the North West branch of the African National Congress (ANC) as provincial media liaison officer from 1997 to 2004. During that time she was also an active member of the party, serving on the National Executive Committee of the ANC Youth League and the Provincial Executive Committee of the ANC Women's League. She was also elected to a term as secretary of the mainstream ANC's branch in Tlhabologa, North West.

== Career in government ==
=== National Assembly: 2004–2009 ===
In the 2004 general election, Mokoto was elected to represent the ANC in the North West constituency in the National Assembly, the lower house of the South African Parliament. In 2005, she was one of two MPs appointed to join the South African observer delegation to the 2005 Palestinian presidential election. She left the National Assembly on 13 April 2009 and focused briefly on managing her business interests.

=== Mayor of Ngaka Modiri Molema: 2009-2011 ===
On 2 September 2009, Mokoto was elected as Executive Mayor of Ngaka Modiri Molema District Municipality in the North West. She succeeded Themba Ngwabeni, who had been sacked amid service delivery protests and financial problems; the latter had also led the provincial government to place the municipality under administration. Mokoto served less than two years in the mayoral office; she was replaced by Phaladi Saku after the 2011 local elections.

At the ANC's 53rd National Conference in December 2012, Mokoto was elected to a five-year term as a member of the party's National Executive Committee, its 80-member executive organ. She received 1,644 votes from among the 4,500 voting delegates.

=== Return to Parliament: 2014–2019 ===
In the 2014 general election, Mokoto was elected to return to the National Assembly. She was ranked second on the ANC's regional party list for the North West. In addition, the ANC appointed her as its whip in the Portfolio Committee on Basic Education, a position which she held throughout the 26th Parliament. She left Parliament at the 2019 general election.
