= Paul Swart =

South African politician

Member of the National Assembly
- In office June 1999 – May 2009

Personal details
- Born: 1 December 1959 (age 66)
- Citizenship: South Africa
- Party: Democratic Alliance; Democratic Party

Paul Stephanus Swart (born 1 December 1959) is a South African politician who represented the Democratic Party (DP) and Democratic Alliance (DA) in the National Assembly from 1999 to 2009. He represented the North West constituency and is also a former Provincial Chairperson of the DP in the North West province.

== Early life ==
Swart was born on 1 December 1959.

== Legislative career ==
He was elected to the National Assembly in the 1999 general election and served two terms, gaining re-election in 2004. On both occasions, he was ranked first on the party list for the North West Province and therefore served as one of the party's two representatives in the province, alongside Joe Seremane. By 1999, he was also the DP's provincial chairperson in the North West.

The DP joined the DA coalition shortly after Swart was elected. He served as the DA's spokesman on safety during his first term and as spokesman on intelligence during his second term. In 2007, the DA caucus elected him as one of the party's four whips in the National Assembly, the others being Sandy Kalyan, Willem Doman, and Donald Lee. He left Parliament after the 2009 general election.
