= Nombiselo Sompa-Masiu =

South African politician

Member of the National Assembly of South Africa
- Incumbent
- Assumed office 2024
- Constituency: North West

Personal details
- Party: African National Congress

Nombiselo Suzan Sompa-Masiu is a South African politician and member of Parliament (MP) for the African National Congress (ANC). She was elected to the National Assembly of South Africa in the 2024 South African general election.

== See also ==
- List of National Assembly members of the 28th Parliament of South Africa
