= Bridgette Tlhomelang =

South African politician

Bridgette Tlhomelang MP

Member of the National Assembly of South Africa
- In office 22 May 2019 – 28 May 2024
- Constituency: North West

Personal details
- Born: Keitumetse Bridgette Tlhomelang; 28 December 1975 (age 50)
- Party: African National Congress

Keitumetse Bridgette Tlhomelang (born 28 December 1975) is a South African politician who served as an African National Congress Member of Parliament from the North West.

== Parliamentary career ==
Tlhomelang is a member of the African National Congress. She was ranked 8th on the ANC's list of parliamentary candidates from the North West for the May 8, 2019 parliamentary election. The ANC won 63.69% of the total vote on the national ballot in the province, entitling it to nine out of the thirteen regional seats in the National Assembly, the lower house of parliament. Tlhomelang was elected to the National Assembly and was sworn in during the first sitting of the National Assembly after the election on 22 May 2019.

Tlhomelang was appointed to serve on the Portfolio Committee on Small Business Development for the 6th Parliament (2019–2024) on 27 June 2019. On 12 July, she was elected to serve on the five-member Steering Committee of the Multi-Party Women's Caucus.
