= Christopher Molefe =

South African politician

Member of the National Assembly
- In office 23 April 2004 – May 2009
- Constituency: North West

Personal details
- Born: Christopher Thabo Molefe; 26 September 1966 (age 59)
- Citizenship: South Africa
- Party: African National Congress

Christopher Thabo Molefe (born 26 September 1966) is a South African politician who represented the North West constituency in the National Assembly from 2004 to 2009. A member of the African National Congress, he was elected in the 2004 general election, ranked tenth on the party's regional list for the North West. He did not stand for re-election in 2009.
