= Joe McGluwa =

South African politician (b. 1963)

Joe McGluwa MP

Leader of the Democratic Alliance in the North West
- In office 30 May 2015 – 21 November 2020
- Preceded by: Chris Hattingh
- Succeeded by: Leon Basson

Member of the National Assembly
- Incumbent
- Assumed office 16 August 2018
- In office 2008 – 12 November 2015

Member of the North West Provincial Legislature
- In office 13 November 2015 – 15 August 2018

Personal details
- Born: 23 August 1963 (age 63) Klerksdorp, South Africa
- Party: Democratic Alliance
- Other political affiliations: Independent Democrats
- Spouse: Nadia McMaster
- Children: 2
- Education: University of South Africa; University of the Witwatersrand
- Occupation: Politician

Joseph Job McGluwa (born 23 August 1963) is a South African politician who was the leader of the Democratic Alliance in the North West province from 2015 to 2020. He has been a member of the National Assembly since 16 August 2018. He was previously in the National Assembly from 2009 to 2015. McGluwa was a member of the North West Provincial Legislature from 2015 to 2018.

Before becoming a member of the Democratic Alliance, he was a member of the now-defunct Independent Democrats. He joined the Democratic Alliance when the Independent Democrats amalgamated with the party. He was the DA's North West premier candidate for the 2019 elections.

== Early life and education ==
One of five children, McGluwa grew up in the Alabama, Klerksdorp. He matriculated from the Alabama Senior Secondary School and proceeded to study at the University of South Africa and achieved a certificate in governance and public leadership. He obtained an Advanced Certificate in public administration and leadership from the University of the Witwatersrand. McGluwa also obtained a post-graduate diploma in management from the same university.

== Political career ==
At the age of 24, McGluwa was elected a Matlosana municipal councillor. He was a member of the Independent Democrats from the party's inception and served as the national organiser of the party.

In 2009, McGluwa was elected to the National Assembly of South Africa. In 2010, the Independent Democrats announced its merger with the Democratic Alliance and he was subsequently given dual party membership. He was appointed a shadow minister in the presidency by the Democratic Alliance parliamentary leader, Lindiwe Mazibuko, in 2012. Also in 2012, he was appointed the parliamentary leader of the Independent Democrats. After the 2014 elections, he fully became a DA MP. On 5 June 2014, he was appointed shadow minister of public service and administration.

McGluwa has since held various Democratic Alliance leadership positions. He was head of the party's Mahikeng, Tswaiing and Ratlou constituency and also a member of the party's Federal Council. McGluwa was previously the deputy provincial Leader of the party in the North West province, before being elected provincial leader in May 2015.

He resigned as a member of the national assembly in November 2015 and was subsequently sworn in as a member of the North West provincial legislature. In August 2018, McGluwa resigned as a member of the provincial legislature and returned to the national assembly. He was sworn in on 16 August 2018.

In September 2018, he was announced as the DA's North West premier candidate. In the 2019 election, the Democratic Alliance's support in the North West dropped, but the party did manage to retain its four seats in the provincial legislature. On 5 June 2019, McGluwa was named the shadow minister of home affairs.

In September 2020, McGluwa announced his retirement as provincial leader. Deputy provincial leader Leon Basson was elected unopposed to succeed him on 21 November 2020.

On 5 December 2020, McGluwa was appointed shadow deputy minister in the presidency in the new shadow cabinet led by John Steenhuisen.

McGluwa was re-elected to Parliament in the 2024 general election, having been ranked high enough on the DA's North West list.

== Personal life ==
McGluwa is married to Nadia McMaster. They have two daughters. McGluwa's brother, Harold, is a member of the Northern Cape provincial legislature and the provincial leader of the DA in the province.

In 2011, it was reported that the then-leader of the Independent Democrats, Patricia de Lille, had instructed the ID caucus in the Theewaterskloof local municipality to appoint McMaster as an accountant. McMaster held that position for a short period and resigned in 2009, two years before the allegation being made public.
