= Portfolio Committee on Defence and Military Veterans =

Portfolio committee of the National Assembly of South Africa

The Portfolio Committee on Defence and Military Veterans is one of the portfolio committees of the National Assembly of South Africa. It oversees the operations of the Department of Defence and Military Veterans and the Minister of Defence and Military Veterans (currently Nosiviwe Mapisa-Nqakula) as well as multiple statutory entities, including Armscor, the Castle Control Board, the Defence Force Service Commission, the Military Ombud, and Reserve Force Council.

As of July 2024, Dakota Legoete of the African National Congress serves as Chairperson of the Committee.

== Membership ==
The Rules Committee of the National Assembly met on 5 June 2019 after the general election on May 8, 2019 and resolved that portfolio committees will consist of 11 members for the sixth parliament (2019–2024): six members from the African National Congress, two members from the Democratic Alliance, one member from the Economic Freedom Fighters and two members from other parties. Members of the National Assembly were elected to serve on the respective portfolio committees on 27 June 2019. The Defence and Military Veterans Portfolio Committee met on 2 July 2019 and Cyril Xaba of the African National Congress was elected chairperson.

As of May 2020, the members of the committee are as follows:

Party	Member
ANC	Dakota Legoete (Chairperson)
ANC	Alexandra Beukes
UDM	Bantu Holomisa
ANC	Tidimalo Legwase
DA	Kobus Marais
EFF	Isaac Mafanya
ANC	Thabo Mmutle
ANC	Moleboheng Modise
ANC	Alice Mthembu
DA	Maliyakhe Shelembe

The following people serve as alternate members:

- Russel Cebekhulu (Inkatha Freedom Party)
- Thomas Walters (Democratic Alliance)

== See also ==
- Committees of the Parliament of South Africa
