= Alice Mthembu =

South African politician (1959–2023)

Alice Mthembu MP

Member of the National Assembly of South Africa
- In office 22 May 2019 – 26 December 2023
- Succeeded by: Khulani Hadebe

Personal details
- Born: Alice Hlebani Mthembu; 10 June 1959
- Died: 26 December 2023 (aged 64)
- Party: African National Congress
- Profession: Politician

Alice Hlebani Mthembu (10 June 1959 – 26 December 2023) was a South African politician from KwaZulu-Natal. She was a Member of Parliament for the African National Congress.

== Early life and education ==
Mthembu was born into a Zulu family on 10 June 1959. She had a matric certificate.

== Political career ==
Mthembu was a member of the provincial executive committee of the African National Congress Women's League in KwaZulu-Natal.

Prior to the May 8, 2019 general election, Mthembu was the seventeenth candidate on the ANC's list of KwaZulu-Natal candidates for the National Assembly. The Democratic Alliance, an opposition party, urged the public to object to her candidature because she produced false documents in 2000 to try to prove that she married the late ANC Member of the Provincial Legislature in KwaZulu-Natal Shedrack Bheki Mthembu in January 1983. The court ruled against her.

She was elected to the National Assembly and sworn in on 22 May 2019. On 27 June, she became a member of the Portfolio Committee on Communications. In November 2020, Mthembu was named to the Portfolio Committee on Defence and Military Veterans and the Joint Standing Committee on Defence.

== Death ==
Mthembu died in a car accident on 26 December 2023. She was replaced in parliament by Khulani Hadebe.

== See also ==
- List of members of the National Assembly of South Africa who died in office
