= Gaolatlhe Kgabo =

South African politician

Member of the National Assembly of South Africa
- Incumbent
- Assumed office 2024
- Constituency: North West

Personal details
- Party: African National Congress

Gaolatlhe David Kgabo is a South African politician and a Member of Parliament (MP) for the African National Congress (ANC). He was elected to the National Assembly of South Africa in the 2024 South African general election in North West constituency.

== See also ==
- List of National Assembly members of the 28th Parliament of South Africa
