= Harold Luntz =

Australian law professor (1937–2025)

Harold Luntz AO (25 February 1937 – 29 January 2025) was an Australian law professor. He was widely acknowledged as one of Australia's leading experts on torts law.

== Life and career ==
Luntz was educated at Athlone Boys' High School in Johannesburg and graduated from the University of Witwatersrand with degrees in arts and law. He served three years’ articles of clerkship at the same time as undertaking his law degree. In 1960, he was employed for a brief period as a solicitor in a firm of solicitors in Johannesburg and then took at Bachelor of Civil Law at Lincoln College, University of Oxford. He began publishing in academic journals in the early 1960s. Some of his appointments:

- 1970 – Visiting Associate Professor at Queen's University in Ontario, Canada.
- 1971 – Visiting Professor at the University of California, Berkeley.
- 1976 – Professor, University of Melbourne.
- 1986–88 – Dean of the Law Faculty, University of Melbourne.
- Visiting Fellow at Wolfson College, Oxford.
- 1993–1998 – Deputy Chair, Seafarers Rehabilitation and Compensation Authority.
- 1967–1984 – Secretary, Victorian Chief Justice's Law Reform Committee.

He was a founder and long-term editor of the Australian Torts Law Journal. He wrote a text in 1974 that saw its fifth edition in 2008 ('Assessment of Damages for Personal Injury and Death'). This text is widely quoted in the highest courts of Australia, as well as England, Canada and the United States.

Long after officially retiring from University work, he continued to maintain an office, teach, write essays and mark exams. The Harold Luntz Graduate Rearch Thesis Prize, named in honour, is awarded annually to the Melbourne Law School graduate research student judged to have presented the best thesis in the previous year.

Despite being an expert on negligence, he was a leading advocate of 'tort law reform' policy, that would replace the law of negligence with a no-fault compensation scheme, and/or provide such adequate social welfare that the awarding of damages becomes unnecessary.

He remained one of the world's foremost scholars and theoreticians of torts and damages law. On Australia Day (the 26th of January), he was awarded an AO for "distinguished service to legal education, as an academic and editor, to professional development, and to the community."

Luntz died on 29 January 2025, at the age of 87.
