= Isaac Mafanya =

South African politician

Isaac Mafanya MP

Member of the National Assembly of South Africa
- Incumbent
- Assumed office 22 May 2019

Personal details
- Party: Economic Freedom Fighters
- Profession: Politician

Washington Tseko Isaac Mafanya is a South African politician and a Member of Parliament (MP) for the Economic Freedom Fighters party.

== Political career ==
Mafanya stood as an EFF parliamentary candidate in the 2019 national elections, and was subsequently elected to the National Assembly and sworn in on 22 May 2019.

He became a member of the Portfolio Committee on Police on 27 June 2019. Mafanya served on the committee until 6 May 2020, when he moved to the Portfolio Committee on Defence and Military Veterans.

In 2024, he and nine other EFF MPs plead not guilty to charges of disrupting President Cyril Ramaphosa's speech on parliament's budget vote. This came following an investigation launched by the National Assembly's Powers and Privileges Committee that began after the MPs disrupted Ramaphosa's speech on June 9 and June 10, 2022.
