= Wendy Makgate =

South African politician

Delegate to the National Council of Provinces

Assembly Member for North West
- In office 7 May 2009 – 21 May 2014

Member of the National Assembly
- In office 23 April 2004 – 6 May 2009
- Constituency: North West

Personal details
- Citizenship: South Africa
- Party: African National Congress

Mamosoeu Wendy Makgate is a South African politician who was a Delegate to the National Council of Provinces (NCOP) from 2009 to 2014, representing the North West. She is a member of the African National Congress (ANC), which she formerly represented in the National Assembly from 2004 to 2009, also serving the North West constituency. During her term in the NCOP, she chaired the Select Committee on Education and Recreation. She retired after the 2014 general election.
