= Lorna Maloney =

South African politician

Member of the National Assembly
- In office May 1994 – May 2009

Personal details
- Born: 28 February 1961 (age 65)
- Citizenship: South Africa
- Party: African National Congress

Lorna Maloney (born 28 February 1961) is a South African politician and businesswoman from the North West. She represented the African National Congress (ANC) in the National Assembly from 1994 to 2009.

== Life and career ==
Maloney was born on 28 February 1961. She was elected to the National Assembly in South Africa's first post-apartheid elections in 1994. She gained re-election in 1999 and 2004, representing the North West constituency from 2004 onwards. She left Parliament after the 2009 general election.

While in Parliament, Maloney acquired a substantial stake in Wesizwe Platinum, a platinum mining company founded in the North West in 2004. In 2007, she held 12.25 million shares in the company, worth about R113 million in total; Destiny estimated that this made her among the richest women in South Africa.

After she left Parliament, Maloney remained active in the ANC's branch in the North West. Ahead of the 2021 local elections, she chaired the party's provincial list committee, which selected nominees to represent the party in local councils. In this capacity, she clashed severely with interim ANC provincial head Hlomane Chauke, whom she accused of complicity in misconduct.
