= Girly Nobanda =

South African politician

Member of the National Assembly of South Africa
- In office 21 May 2014 – 7 May 2019
- Constituency: North West

Personal details
- Party: African National Congress
- Occupation: Politician

Girly Namhla Nobanda is a South African politician and a former Member of the National Assembly of South Africa for the African National Congress. She was elected in the 2014 general election from the ANC's North West regional-to-national list.

Nobanda was a member of the Portfolio Committee on Public Enterprises and an alternate member of the Ad Hoc Committee on the Review of Parmed. Nobanda was named to the ANC's North West provincial task team (PTT) following the disbandment of the Provincial Executive Committee (PEC) in 2018. Nobanda did not stand for re-election in the 2019 general election.
