= Loyiso Mpumlwana =

South African politician and advocate (died 2020)

Member of the National Assembly of South Africa
- In office 12 June 2020 – 23 December 2020
- Succeeded by: Brandon Pillay
- In office 21 May 2014 – 7 May 2019

Personal details
- Born: Loyiso Khanyisa Bunye Mpumlwana
- Died: 23 December 2020
- Party: African National Congress
- Profession: Advocate; Politician

Loyiso Khanyisa Bunye Mpumlwana (died 23 December 2020) was a South African politician and advocate. A member of the African National Congress, he was elected to the National Assembly in 2014. He served until the 2019 election, when he lost his seat. In 2020, he was elected to return to the assembly.

== Career ==
Mpumlwana was an African National Congress underground operative during apartheid. He worked closely with Jeff Radebe and Mazwi Yako. Mpumlwana later practised as an advocate.

=== First term in parliament ===
Mpumalwana was elected as a Member of Parliament at the 2014 South African general election. During the fifth parliament (2014–2019), he was a member of the Portfolio Committee on Justice and Constitutional Development, the Portfolio Committee on International Relations and Cooperation, the Constitutional Review Committee, and the Ad Hoc Joint Committee on Probing Violence Against Foreign Nationals. He was also the constituency contact at the ANC's constituency office in Umtata. In 2016, he applied for public protector but was not shortlisted by the ad hoc committee. The committee chose Busisiwe Mkhwebane. Mpumlwana openly supported Mkhwebane and dismissed calls for her removal.

In August 2017, Mpumlwana was criticised for defending the alleged beating of Gabriella Engels by Zimbabwean First Lady, Grace Mugabe. He said that in African culture it was acceptable to beat up young people who misbehaved.

In 2019, he stood for re-election at 126th on the ANC's national list. Due to the ANC's electoral decline, he lost his seat.

=== Candidacy for deputy public protector ===
In September 2019, he was a candidate for deputy public protector. The justice committee chose Kholeka Gcaleka.

=== Return to parliament ===
He was later elected to fill Nomvula Mokonyane's seat in the National Assembly. He was sworn in on 12 June 2020. His swearing-in was conducted virtually because of the COVID-19 pandemic. The ANC welcomed his return to parliament. On 15 July 2020, he became a member of the Portfolio Committee on Public Enterprises.

== Death ==
Mpumlwana died on 23 December 2020, from COVID-19. His brother-in-law Mncedisi Filtane also succumbed to the virus.

== See also ==
- List of members of the National Assembly of South Africa who died in office
