= Portfolio Committee on Home Affairs =

Portfolio committee of the National Assembly

The Portfolio Committee on Home Affairs is a portfolio committee of the National Assembly in the Parliament of South Africa. The remit of the committee includes oversight of the Department of Home Affairs, the Government Printing Works, and the Electoral Commission of South Africa.

== Membership ==
Members elected in the general election that was held on 8 May 2019, were appointed on 27 June. Advocate Bongani Bongo of the African National Congress was elected chair of the committee on 2 July. The committee's members are as follows:

In 2021 Bongo was removed as chairperson and replaced with Steve Chabane.

Member	Party
Steve Chabane MP (Chairperson)	African National Congress
Bongani Bongo MP	African National Congress
Angel Khanyile MP	Democratic Alliance
Tidimalo Legwase MP	African National Congress
Mosiuoa Lekota MP	Congress of the People
Moleboheng Modise MP	African National Congress
Asnath Molekwa MP	African National Congress
Adrian Roos MP	Democratic Alliance
Brandon Pillay MP	African National Congress
Florence Tito MP	Economic Freedom Fighters
Liezl van der Merwe MP	Inkatha Freedom Party

The following people serve as alternate members:

Alternate Member	Party
Richard Dyantyi MP	African National Congress
Ganief Hendricks MP	Al Jama-ah
Vuyani Pambo MP	Economic Freedom Fighters
Munzoor Shaik Emam MP	National Freedom Party

== See also ==
- Committees of the Parliament of South Africa
