= Solly Rasmeni =

South African politician and trade unionist (born 1953)

Member of the National Assembly
- In office June 1999 – May 2009
- Constituency: North West

Personal details
- Born: Solomon Mandlenkosi Rasmeni; 17 September 1953 (age 72) Sterkspruit, Cape Province; Union of South Africa
- Party: African National Congress
- Spouse: Rachel Rasmeni (m. 1981)

Solomon Mandlenkosi Rasmeni (born 17 September 1953) is a South African politician and former trade unionist. Formerly an organiser for the National Union of Mineworkers (NUM) in the Western Transvaal, he represented the African National Congress (ANC) in the National Assembly from 1999 to 2009. Before that, he was a member of the North West caucus of the Senate during the first democratic Parliament.

== Early life and union activism ==
Rasmeni was born on 17 September 1953 in Sterkspruit in the former Cape Province. He was a mineworker in the Western Transvaal, from 1975 in Klerksdrop, where he worked at Vaal Reefs. He was a founding member of the NUM and later worked for it as a regional organiser. He and his wife were also active in Congress-aligned civic organising against apartheid.

Due to his activism, he was the subject of harassment and attacks, including pursuit by a vigilante mob in 1986 and two separate bombing attacks on his home in Jouberton in 1990 and 1991. He was also arrested on several occasions. Most proximately, he was arrested on 30 December 1990 and detained without trial for two weeks; he and others detained with him sustained a hunger strike throughout their detention. Also in the early 1990s, after the ANC was unbanned by the apartheid government, he served as the party's regional chairperson in the Western Transvaal.

== Legislative career ==
In South Africa's first post-apartheid elections in 1994, Rasmeni was elected to represent the ANC in the North West caucus of the Senate, though he left his seat before the end of the legislative term. In the next general election in 1999, he was elected to the National Assembly, and he served two terms, gaining re-election in 2004; he was highly ranked on the ANC's party list on both occasions: second on the North West list in 1999 and first in 2004. He left Parliament after the 2009 general election.

== Personal life ==
He married Rachel Rasmeni in 1981.
