= Ezekiel Molala =

South African politician

Lesiba Ezekiel Molala

Member of the National Assembly of South Africa
- In office 22 May 2019 – 28 May 2024
- Constituency: North West

Personal details
- Born: Lesiba Ezekiel Molala
- Party: African National Congress

Lesiba Ezekiel Molala is a South African politician who was elected to the National Assembly of South Africa in the 2019 general election as a member of the African National Congress.

During his tenure as an MP, Molala served on the Portfolio Committee on Communications.

Molala did not stand in 2024.
