= Tidimalo Legwase =

South African politician

Tidimalo Legwase MP
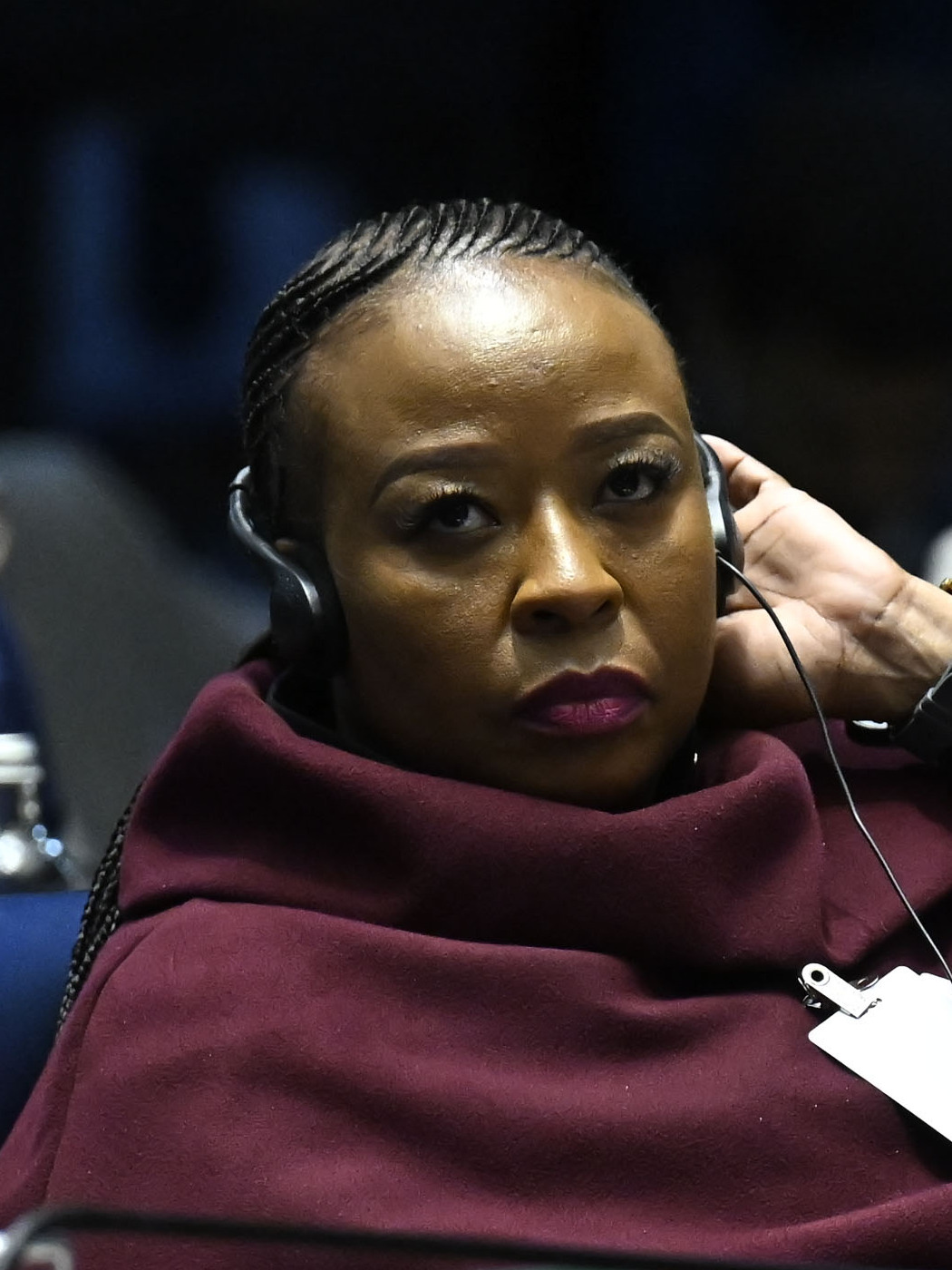
- Legwase (2025)

Permanent Delegate to the National Council of Provinces
- Incumbent
- Assumed office 15 June 2024

Member of the National Assembly of South Africa
- In office 22 May 2019 – 28 May 2024
- Constituency: North West

Personal details
- Party: African National Congress
- Occupation: Member of Parliament
- Profession: Politician

Tidimalo Innocentia Legwase is a South African politician for the African National Congress. She has been a permanent Delegate to the National Council of Provinces since June 2024, after previously serving in the National Assembly from May 2019 until May 2024.

== Parliamentary career ==
Legwase stood as an ANC parliamentary candidate from the North West in the 2019 parliamentary election, and was elected to the National Assembly and sworn in on 22 May 2019.

In June 2019, Legwase was named to the Portfolio Committee on Defence and Military Veterans, the Portfolio Committee on Home Affairs and the Joint Standing Committee on Defence.

In June 2021, she became a member of the Committee for Section 194 Enquiry which was established to determine Public Protector Busisiwe Mkhwebane's fitness to hold office.

Following the 2024 general election, Legwase became a Permanent Delegate to the National Council of Provinces from the North West. She was elected to chair the Select Committee on Appropriations.
