= Sibusiso Kula =

South African politician

Member of the National Assembly of South Africa
- In office 22 May 2019 – 14 October 2023

Personal details
- Born: Sibusiso Macdonald Kula; 4 July 1988 (age 37)
- Party: African National Congress

Sibusiso Macdonald Kula (born 4 July 1988) is a South African politician who was elected to the South African parliament at the 2019 general election as a representative of the African National Congress.

== Political career ==
Kula was ninth on the North West regional electoral list of the African National Congress for the 2019 general election. At the election, he won a seat in the National Assembly. Upon election, he became a member of the Portfolio Committee on Mineral Resources and Energy.

Kula later became a member of the Rules Committee. Kula's committee attendance rates for 2019 and 2020 were 62% and 81%, respectively.

== Murder charges ==
On 20 January 2023, Kula was arrested and charged with the murder of his 31-year-old wife Jennifer Motlomi in November 2022. Motlomi was stabbed several times at their home in the Kanana township outside Orkney in the North West.

Kula lost his parliamentary membership in terms of section 47(3)(b) of the Constitution on 14 October 2023.
