= Philly Mapulane =

South African politician

Philly Mapulane MP

Deputy Minister of Communications and Digital Technologies
- Incumbent
- Assumed office 6 August 2021
- President: Cyril Ramaphosa
- Preceded by: Pinky Kekana

Chairperson of the Portfolio Committee on Higher Education, Science and Technology
- In office 2 July 2019 – 5 August 2021
- Preceded by: Committee established
- Succeeded by: Nompendulo Mkhatshwa

Chairperson of the Portfolio Committee on Environmental Affairs
- In office 12 May 2016 – 7 May 2019
- Preceded by: Jackson Mthembu
- Succeeded by: Committee abolished

Chairperson of the Ad Hoc Joint Committee on Appointment of Board Members to the National Youth Development Agency
- In office 2 March 2016 – 7 May 2019
- Preceded by: Committee established
- Succeeded by: Committee abolished

Personal details
- Born: Mohlopi Philemon Mapulane; 1972 (age 53–54)
- Party: African National Congress
- Occupation: Deputy Minister
- Profession: Politician

Mohlopi Philemon Mapulane (born 1972) is a South African politician who is the current Deputy Minister of Communications and Digital Technologies and a member of the National Assembly of South Africa for the African National Congress. He previously served as Chairperson of the Ad Hoc Joint Committee on Appointment of Board Members to the National Youth Development Agency from 2016 to 2019, as Chairperson of the Portfolio Committee on Environmental Affairs from 2016 to 2019, as Chairperson of the Portfolio Committee on Higher Education, Science and Technology from 2019 to 2021, and as Chairperson of the Powers and Privileges of Parliament Committee from 2020 to 2021.

Prior to his election to the National Assembly, he served as deputy speaker of the North West Provincial Legislature.

== Career ==
Mapulane was the municipal manager of the Madibeng Local Municipality until he was suspended by the municipality in October 2009. In August 2010 he was arrested over allegations that he received kickbacks on government tenders. All the fraud and corruption charges against him were provisionally withdrawn by the Specialised Commercial Crimes Court in Pretoria in 2012. Mapulane responded by saying that a political conspiracy against him failed.

== Political career ==
Mapulane served as the provincial treasurer of the African National Congress. On 17 July 2012 he was sworn in as a member of the North West Provincial Legislature as he was the next candidate on the ANC list. He was elected deputy speaker of the provincial legislature on 14 August 2012.

Mapulane stood for election to the National Assembly in the 2014 general elections as a parliamentary candidate on the ANC list in the North West. He was elected to the National Assembly at the election. Shortly afterwards he was named to the Portfolio Committee on Cooperative Governance and Traditional Affairs.

On 2 March 2016 Mapulane was elected to head the Ad Hoc Joint Committee on Appointment of Board Members to the National Youth Development Agency alongside NCOP Permanent delegate Mase Manopole. He was elected chairperson of the Portfolio Committee on Environmental Affairs on 12 May 2016.

On 14 February 2018, Mapulane tweeted that president Jacob Zuma was "either deranged, psychotic, insane, of unsound mind or just foolish" for refusing to step down as president.

Mapulane was re-elected to the National Assembly in the 2019 general election. He was then elected chair of the Portfolio Committee on Higher Education, Science and Technology. On 25 February 2020, he was elected chairperson of the Powers and Privileges of Parliament Committee.

On 7 April 2021, Mapulane became a member of the Committee for Section 194 Enquiry. The committee will determine Public Protector Busisiwe Mkhwebane's fitness to hold office.

== National government ==
Mapulane was appointed as Deputy Minister of Communications and Digital Technologies on 5 August 2021. He then stepped down as chairperson of the Higher Education, Science and Technology and Powers and Privileges of Parliament Committees. He was sworn in the next day.
