= Senné =

Senné may refer to two villages in Slovakia:

- Senné, Michalovce District
- Senné, Veľký Krtíš District
