= Jane Manganye =

South African politician

Member of the National Assembly of South Africa
- In office 22 May 2019 – 28 May 2024
- In office 6 May 2009 – 6 May 2014

Deputy Speaker of the North West Provincial Legislature
- In office 21 May 2014 – 7 May 2019
- Preceded by: Philemon Mapulane
- Succeeded by: Viola Motsumi

Member of the North West Provincial Legislature
- In office 21 May 2014 – 7 May 2019

Personal details
- Party: African National Congress
- Profession: Politician

Jane Manganye is a South African politician who has served as a member of the South African National Assembly from May 2009 to May 2014, and again from May 2019 until May 2024. She was the deputy speaker of the North West Provincial Legislature from May 2014 to May 2019. Manganye is a member of the African National Congress.

== Political career ==
A member of the African National Congress, Manganye was elected to the National Assembly in the 2009 general election. During her first term, she was a member of the Portfolio Committee on Water Affairs and Environmental Affairs; the Ad Hoc Committee on Coordinated Oversight on Service Delivery; and the Portfolio Committee on Tourism. Her constituency office was in Rustenburg.

In 2013, she was elected chairperson of the provincial African National Congress Women's League.

Manganye was elected to the North West Provincial Legislature in the 2014 general election. When the legislature reconvened, she was elected deputy speaker. Also in 2014, the provincial ANC leadership expected that she would campaign for Bathabile Dlamini to become the national president of the women's league. Instead, Manganye campaigned for incumbent Angie Motshekga, which led to her removal as chair of the provincial women's league.

In December 2017, the ANC provincial leadership threatened to recall her from the position of deputy speaker, if she did not step down. Manganye claimed that she was being "purged" because of her support for ANC deputy president Cyril Ramaphosa's party presidential campaign. The provincial ANC branches "overwhelmingly" supported Nkosazana Dlamini-Zuma's campaign. The provincial leadership denied her accusation. She remained deputy speaker until the end of the term.

Manganye returned to the National Assembly following the 2019 general election. She was then appointed to serve on the Portfolio Committee on Social Development.

Manganye did not stand for reelection in 2024.
