= Leon Basson =

South African politician (born 1960)

Leon Basson MP
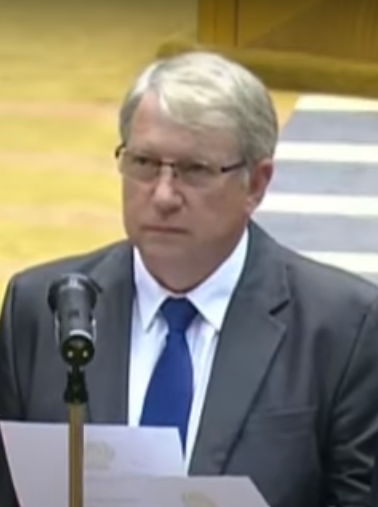
- Basson in 2019

Shadow Minister of Water & Sanitation
- In office 5 December 2020 – 14 June 2024
- Leader: John Steenhuisen
- Preceded by: Position established
- Succeeded by: Position vacant

Leader of the Democratic Alliance in the North West
- Incumbent
- Assumed office 21 November 2020
- Deputy: Cornel Dryer; Freddy Sonakile
- Preceded by: Joe McGluwa

Deputy Leader of the Democratic Alliance in the North West
- In office 2017 – 21 November 2020
- Leader: Joe McGluwa
- Preceded by: Petro Nel
- Succeeded by: Freddy Sonakile

Shadow Minister of Human Settlements, Water and Sanitation
- In office 5 June 2019 – 5 December 2020
- Leader: John Steenhuisen; Mmusi Maimane
- Preceded by: Position established
- Succeeded by: Position split

Shadow Minister of Water and Sanitation
- In office 1 July 2017 – 5 June 2019
- Leader: Mmusi Maimane
- Preceded by: Heinrich Volmink
- Succeeded by: Position abolished

Shadow Deputy Minister of Water and Sanitation
- In office 5 June 2014 – 1 July 2017
- Preceded by: Position established
- Succeeded by: Tarnia Baker

Member of the National Assembly of South Africa
- Incumbent
- Assumed office 21 May 2014

Personal details
- Born: Leonard Jones Basson; 8 April 1960 (age 66)
- Party: Democratic Alliance
- Spouse: Daleen
- Children: 3

Leonard Jones Basson (born 8 April 1960) is a South African politician from the North West Province. He has represented the Democratic Alliance (DA) in the National Assembly of South Africa since May 2014 and has been the party's provincial leader in the North West since November 2020. In July 2024 he was elected as the chairperson of the National Assembly's Portfolio Committee on Water and Sanitation.

Basson was a long-serving local councillor in his hometown, the North West's Madibeng Local Municipality. After joining the National Assembly in the 2014 general election, he was appointed to the Official Opposition Shadow Cabinet of South Africa, where he was involved in the water and sanitation portfolio for the next decade; he was Shadow Deputy Minister of Water and Sanitation between 2014 and 2017, the Shadow Minister of Water and Sanitation from 2017 to 2019, the Shadow Minister of Human Settlements, Water and Sanitation from 2019 to 2020, and then the Shadow Minister of Water and Sanitation again from 2020 until 2024.

He succeeded Joe McGluwa as the DA's provincial leader at a party elective conference in November 2020. Before then, he deputised McGluwa as deputy provincial leader between 2017 and 2020.

== Early life and career ==
Basson was born on 8 April 1960. He moved to Brits in the North West Province as a teenager in 1976 and remained there through his adult life. He was a longstanding member of the governing bodies of Pansdrif Primary School and Hoërskool Brits, serving six years as chairperson of the former and nine years as chairperson of the latter.

From 1 November 1995 to 6 May 2014, he was a local councillor in Madibeng Local Municipality, which governs his hometown. In his later years on the council he represented the Democratic Alliance (DA; formerly the Democratic Party).

== Parliament of South Africa: 2014–present ==
Basson left the Madibeng council after the May 2014 general election, in which he was elected to represent the DA in the National Assembly. He was attached to the DA's internal constituency office in Brits. In addition, the DA's parliamentary leader, Mmusi Maimane, appointed him as Shadow Deputy Minister of Water and Sanitation. In 2017, he was promoted to Shadow Minister of Water and Sanitation, and he also became the Deputy Provincial Leader of the DA in the North West.

In the May 2019 general election, Basson was re-elected to his seat in the National Assembly. He became the head of the DA's Madibeng constituency office, and Maimane retained him in his shadow cabinet portfolio, which was enlarged in line with a government cabinet reshuffle; he was named as Shadow Minister of Human Settlements, Water and Sanitation.

On 21 November 2020, Basson was elected unopposed as the DA's provincial leader in the North West, succeeding Joe McGluwa, who stood down. In the following days, he was appointed as Shadow Minister of Water and Sanitation by newly elected DA leader John Steenhuisen; the portfolio was split again, with Emma Powell becoming Shadow Minister of Human Settlements.

In April 2021, Basson opposed the deployment of 24 Cuban engineers to assist the Department of Water and Sanitation in addressing South Africa's water crisis and called on Minister Lindiwe Sisulu to reverse the deployment in favour of employing South African engineers.

Following the suspension of former premier Supra Mahumapelo's ANC membership in late-April 2021, Basson said that "the suspension comes more than ten years too late" and that the North West Province "would have been in a better position today if Supra Mahumapelo never happened."

Basson was re-elected for a second term as provincial leader at the DA's provincial conference on 29 July 2023.

In the 2024 general election, Basson was re-elected to the National Assembly for his third term. He was elected to chair the Portfolio Committee on Water and Sanitation in July 2024.

== Personal life ==
He is married to Daleen, and they have three children and six grandchildren. He is a member of the NG Church in Brits.
