= Sello Seitlholo =

South African politician

Sello Seitlholo MP
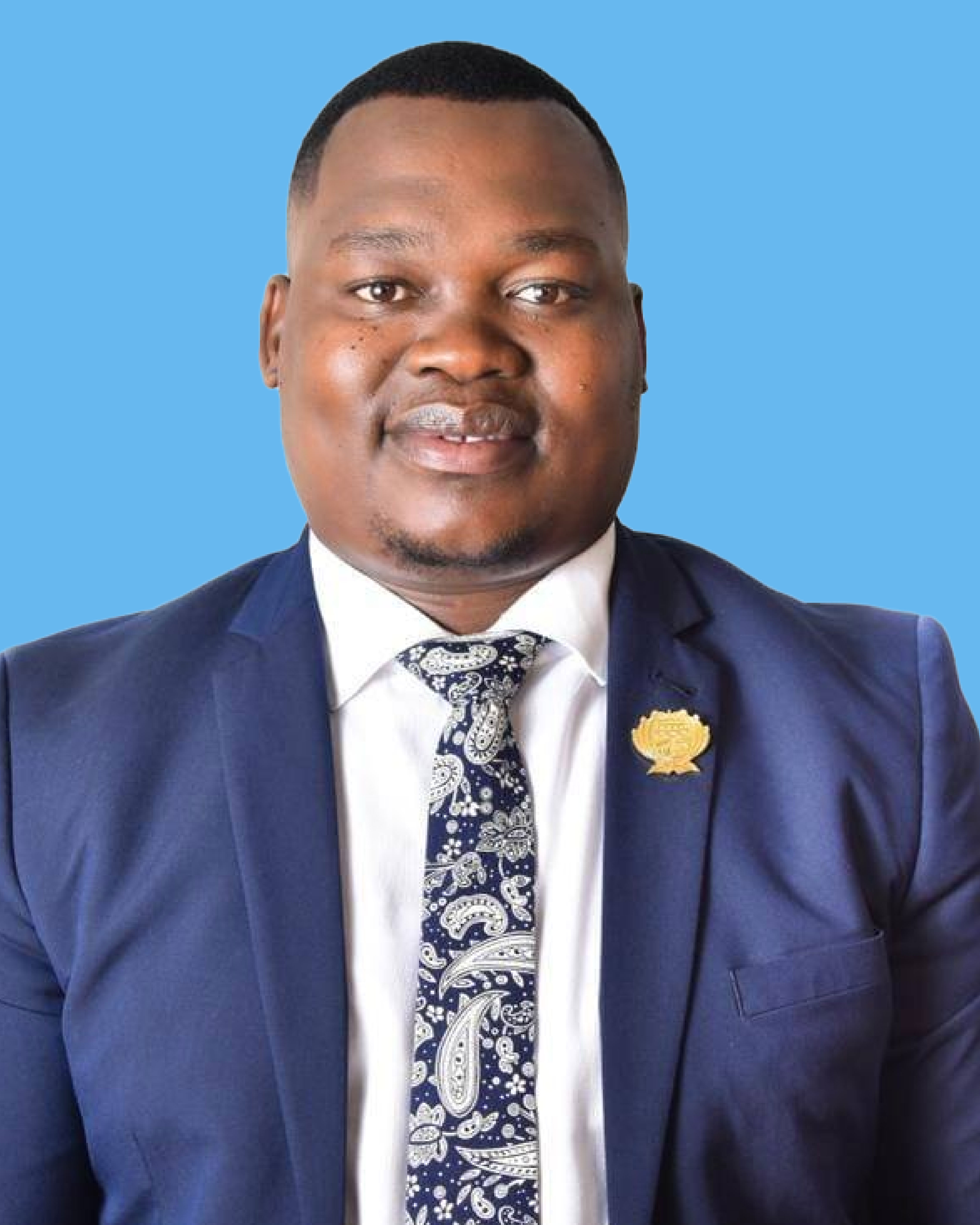

Deputy Minister of Water and Sanitation
- In office 3 July 2024 – 30 June 2026
- President: Cyril Ramaphosa
- Minister: Pemmy Majodina
- Preceded by: Judith Tshabalala
- Succeeded by: Jack Bloom

Shadow Minister of Public Works and Infrastructure
- In office 21 April 2023 – 14 June 2024
- Leader: John Steenhuisen
- Preceded by: Samantha Graham
- Succeeded by: Position vacant

Member of the National Assembly of South Africa
- Incumbent
- Assumed office 22 May 2019

Personal details
- Born: Isaac Sello Seitlholo; 9 September 1989 (age 37)
- Party: Democratic Alliance (2017–present)
- Other political affiliations: African National Congress (Until 2017)
- Education: North-West University
- Profession: Lecturer

Isaac Sello Seitlholo (born 9 September 1989) is a South African politician, a Member of Parliament (MP) for the Democratic Alliance, and the former Deputy Minister of Water and Sanitation. He was the Shadow Minister of Public Works and Infrastructure in the DA's Shadow Cabinet.

== Background ==
Isaac Sello Seitlholo was born into a Tswana family on 9 September 1989. He matriculated from Tlokwe Secondary School in 2008. He holds a BA degree and a BA Honours degree in Development and Management and also a master's degree in Public Management and Governance from the North-West University.

== Career ==
Prior to the 2009 general election, Seitlholo did some campaign work for the African National Congress. He then worked as a lecturer at North-West University.

In 2017, Seitlholo joined the Democratic Alliance as a provincial campaign director. He stood as a DA parliamentary candidate from the North West in the 2019 national elections, and was subsequently elected to the National Assembly and sworn in on 22 May 2019. In parliament, he serves on the Portfolio Committee on Transport.

In November 2020, Seitlholo declared his candidacy for deputy provincial leader of the DA. He lost to Freddy Sonakile at the party's provincial congress.

Seitlholo was promoted to Shadow Minister of Public Works and Infrastructure on 21 April 2023.

Seitlholo returned to Parliament following the 2024 general election. Thereafter, the DA entered into a coalition agreement with the ANC which saw Seitlholo appointed as the Deputy Minister of Water and Sanitation.

On 17 June 2026, DA leader Geordin Hill-Lewis requested that president Cyril Ramaphosa remove Seitlholo as the Deputy Minister of Water and Sanitation. Ramaphosa finalised Hill-Lewis's request on 30 June.
