= Tshiamo Modisane =

South African author and activist (born 1990)

- Born: Tshiamo Kgositsile Modisane; 24 January 1990 (age 36); East Rand, Gauteng, South Africa
- Education: University of Johannesburg
- Occupations: Author; activist; actress
- Years active: 2018–present

Tshiamo Kgositsile Modisane (born 24 January 1990) is a South African author, activist, television personality and actress. She is the founder of Linzy-Lindsay Foundation and she received the The Sowetan SMag Woman of the Year in Fashion and Beauty award in 2022.

== Career ==
Modisane began her media career in 2018 when she was named the Lux’s first gender non-conforming brand ambassador. In 2019, she expanded into entertainment media, when she worked as a wardrobe stylist intern and later for magazines like True Love, Move! and Drum, and also wrote a lifestyle and entertainment category for The Citizen.

In 2021, Modisane launched her podcast "The Transcript with Tshiamo". The same year, she landed her first major acting role as Thabang Sithole, a non-binary character in SABC 1 drama African Dreams. Her acting profile grew in January 2022 when she played as Nina on e.tv telenovela House of Zwide. Later in 2022, she was named the The Sowetan SMag Woman of the Year in Fashion and Beauty, recognizing both her styling work and public advocacy.

In 2023, Modisane won the Feather Awards for Socialite of the Year, which raised her visibility in fashion and LGBTQ. In February 2025, Penguin Random House SA published her book titled I AM TSHIAMO – My Self Acceptance and Womanhood.

== Personal life ==
Modisane is an openly transgender woman and uses she/her pronouns.

== Advocacy ==
Modisane founded the Linzy-Lindsay Foundation in 2021 after surviving sexual assault. The organization’s stated purpose is to create a safe space for people, especially within the LGBTQ+ and trans community to develop skills and make a greater contribution to society. It operates as her main advocacy platform. It focuses on skills development and public education around gender identity.

== Filmography ==
Year	Film	Role	Notes
2021	African Drums	Thabang Sithole	Supporting role
2022	House of Zwide	Nina	Recurring role, season 2

== Awards and nominations ==
Year	Association	Category	Nominated works	Result	Ref.
2023	Feather Awards	Socialite of the Year	Herself	Won	

== Works ==
- I Am Tshiamo. Johannesburg: Penguin Random House South Africa. 2025. ISBN 1776390695.
