= Athlone Boys' High School =

Boys-only high school in Johannesburg, South Africa

Coordinates: 26.1864°S 28.0808°E

Athlone Boys’ High School is a public boys’ secondary school located in Bezuidenhout Valley, Johannesburg, in the Gauteng province of South Africa. The school offers the national curriculum and serves learners from the surrounding communities. In addition to academics, Athlone Boys’ High School participates in extracurricular activities, including sport and cultural programmes.

== History of Athlone ==
The school traces its origins to 1915, when it was founded as the "Junior Student Centre" in Doornfontein. Established during World War I, its original purpose was to train teachers and provide secondary education during a period of wartime staff shortages. As the institution expanded, it was renamed "Doornfontein High School" in 1923.

The current campus in Bezuidenhout Valley was officially opened on December 11, 1926, by H.E. The Rt. Hon. The Earl of Athlone, then the Governor-General of the Union of South Africa. This inauguration is memorialized by a bronze plaque on campus featuring the Earl’s heraldic crest and the motto, "Fearless and Faithful".

Initially a co-educational facility, the school transitioned into a monastic boys' institution in 1951 when female students were moved to form Athlone Girls' High School.

== Headmasters of Athlone Boys' High School ==
- 1915–1917: A.M. Robb, M.A. (Aberdeen)
- 1917–1935: A.S. Holland, M.A. (Oxon)
- 1936–1943: W.S. Matthew, B.Sc. (Lond)
- 1944–1951: B.L.W. Brett, B.A. (Hons) (S.A.)
- 1951–1974: J.E. Davies, M.B.E., M.A., D.Ed. (Pret)
- 1975–1981: D.D.W. Herd, B.A. (Wits), T.T.H.D. (J.C.E.)
- 1982–1986: D.P. Campbell, B.A. (Wits), T.T.H.D. (J.C.E.)
- 1986–1991: L. White, B.Com. (Hons) (S.A.), T.T.D. (J.C.E.), I.A.T.
- 1992–1994: G.J.R. Currin, B.Sc. (Pmb), N.T.D.
- 1995–: Mr. L.J.J. Van Wyk, M.Ed (Psych), B.Ed (Hons) (SCG), B.Ed (Hons), B.A., FDE (YP) (UNISA), HDE (RAU)
- unknown - 2023 Mr. Dayannd
- 2024 - present: Mr. Njoko

== Athlone Boys' today ==
As of 2026, the school serves approximately 550 learners. Despite facing significant infrastructure challenges, it maintains a resilient academic spirit. This was evidenced in 2025 when the school achieved a 92% Matric pass rate.

== Campus and facilities ==
The campus is noted for its historic red-brick architecture and dedicated memorial spaces. Notable features include:

- The Elwyn Davies Assembly Hall and Theatre: A central hub for gatherings and cultural performances, featuring a portrait of Elwyn Davies prominently displayed above the entrance.
- Sports Grounds: An expansive cricket and sports field overlooked by a historic brick pavilion and clubhouse.
- Memorials: A shield-shaped plaque honors the memory of John Hopkins Hutton, founder of the Old Athlonian Association, who died on March 24, 1926.

The school’s ongoing history is recorded in its official annual publication, The Athlonian, which has been in print for decades.

== Uniform and identity ==
The school's identity is anchored by the motto "Fearless and Faithful" (Latin: Fidelis et Fortis). The school uniform consists of a dark green single-breasted blazer featuring bold vertical yellow and red stripes, and striped pattern tie matching the blazer. The stripes are diagonal for senior students and horizontal for junior students. The remainder of the uniform consists of standard grey school trousers and grey socks.

== Roll of Honour ==
The school maintains a Roll of Honour dedicated to the former pupils who served and lost their lives during World War II (1939–1945).

- Ashurst, H.D.
- Baratt, W.
- Carnovski, L.
- Daleski, C.
- Eliastam, S.
- Forbes, R.
- Gaynor, H.
- Hacker, A.M.
- Jackson, B.
- Johnston, F.
- Hume, F.
- Klass, E.
- Klatzkin, A.
- Krombein, S.
- McDowell, H.
- Margolius, H.
- Miller, G.
- Nidzon, L.
- Phillips, DR.
- Resnik, M.
- Salant, H.
- Saul, E.
- Schilanski, I.
- Siewe, A.
- Smith, A.M.
- Spooner, B.
- Stein, H.
- Stone, R.
- Temple-Thurston, L.
- Weblin, J.

"At the going down of the sun and in the morning, we will remember them."

Athlone Boys' High School
- Johannesburg, South Africa.

Information
- Type: High School
- Founded: 1915
- Sister school: Athlone Girls' High School
- Gender: Boys
- Slogan: Fearless and Faithful

== Notable Old Athlonians ==
- George Bizos, human rights lawyer
- Johnny Clegg, Musician
- Gerald Gordon, architect
- Sol Kerzner, businessman
- Harold Luntz, legal academic
- Harold Henning, Pga golfer
