= State of the Province Address (South Africa) =

State of the Province Address

The State of the Province Address (abbreviated SOPA) is an annual event in each of South Africa's nine provinces, in which the premier of the province reports on the state of the province, normally to a formal sitting of the province's unicameral legislature.

The speech marks the opening of the provincial legislature and is attended by important political and governmental figures of the province, including members of the provincial legislature and other high-regarded guests.

== See also ==
- State of the Nation Address (South Africa), national equivalent
