= Nombuyiselo Adoons =

South African politician

Member of the National Assembly of South Africa
- In office 22 May 2019 – 28 May 2024

Personal details
- Born: 18 August 1978 (age 47)
- Party: African National Congress
- Occupation: Member of Parliament
- Profession: Politician

Nombuyiselo Gladys Adoons (born 18 August 1978) is a South African politician who served as a Member of Parliament (MP) for the African National Congress.

== Parliamentary career ==
In 2019, she stood for election to the South African National Assembly as 3rd on the African National Congress's North West regional list. At the election, Adoons won a seat in the National Assembly. She was sworn in on 22 May 2019. On 27 June 2019, she became a member of the Portfolio Committee on Basic Education.

Adoons was not included on any ANC parliamentary list for the 2024 general election, and subsequently left parliament at the election.
