= Sonto Motaung =

South African politician

Nomasonto Motaung MP

Member of the National Assembly of South Africa
- Incumbent
- Assumed office 8 August 2024
- Constituency: National List

Member of the National Assembly of South Africa
- In office 22 May 2019 – 28 May 2024
- Constituency: National List

Personal details
- Born: Nomasonto Evelyn Motaung; 1985 or 1986 (age 40–41)
- Party: ANC
- Occupation: Member of Parliament
- Profession: Politician

Nomasonto Evelyn Motaung (born 08 June 1986) is a South African politician who was elected as a Member of Parliament (MP) for the African National Congress in the 2019 national election. In March 2023, she was appointed as Deputy Minister in the Presidency and served in that position till 2024. She previously served as the Speaker of Mafube Local Municipality from 2016 until she was elected to serve in Parliament in 2019.

== Political career ==
In 2019, Motaung stood for election to the South African National Assembly as 84th on the ANC's national list. She was elected to the National Assembly and was sworn in as a Member of Parliament on 22 May 2019. At the age of 33, she was one of the youngest MPs elected at the election. She served on the Portfolio Committee on Trade and Industry.

In May 2020, Motaung asked why there was so much "noise with journalists" when the lotteries commission claimed to be operating so efficiently.

In April 2021, Motaung was named to the newly established African National Congress Youth League National Youth Task Team.

In March 2023, she was appointed as Deputy Minister in the Presidency by president Cyril Ramaphosa.

She was defeated for re-election in the 2024 South African general election, however was later brought back to Parliament due to the resignation of Bejani Chauke.
