= North West Provincial Legislature =

Legislature of the North West Province

North West Provincial Legislature Noordwes Provinsiale Wetgewer (Afrikaans) Kopano ya Molao ya Lekgotla la Bokone Bophirima (Tswana)
- 7th Legislature

Type
- Type: Unicameral

Leadership
- Speaker: Desbo Mohono, African National Congress since 14 June 2024
- Deputy Speaker: Collen Maine, African National Congress since 11 October 2024
- Premier: Lazzy Mokgosi, African National Congress since 14 June 2024
- Leader of the Opposition: Keobakile Babuile, Economic Freedom Fighters since 22 May 2019

Structure
- Seats: 38
- Political groups: Government (23): ANC (23); Official Opposition (7): EFF (7); Other parties (8): DA (5); FF+ (1); MK (1); ActionSA (1)

Elections
- Voting system: Party-list proportional representation
- Last election: 29 May 2024

Meeting place
- 3138 Lucas Mangope Hwy, Mmabatho Unit 1, Mmabatho, 2790

Website
- www.nwpl.gov.za

The North West Provincial Legislature is the primary legislative body of the South African province of North West. It is unicameral in its composition, and elects the premier and the provincial cabinet from among the members of the leading party or coalition in the parliament.

At the commencement of the 7th provincial legislature on 14 June 2024, the number of seats allocated to the North West Provincial Legislature increased from 33 to 38.

== Powers ==
The North West Provincial Legislature elects the Premier of North West, the head of the province's executive. The legislature, by passing a motion of no confidence, can force the Premier to resign. The legislature may pass a motion of no confidence to compel the Premier to reconfigure the Executive Council, even though the Executive Council members are selected by the Premier. The legislature also appoints North West's delegates to the National Council of Provinces, allocating delegates to parties in proportion to the number of seats each party holds in the legislature.

The legislature has the power to pass legislation in multiple fields, matters such as health, education (except universities), agriculture, housing, environmental protection, and development planning, all mentioned in the national constitution; in some fields the legislative power is shared with the national parliament, while in others it is reserved to the province alone.

The legislature oversees the administration of the North West provincial government, and the Premier and the members of the Executive Council are required to report to the legislature on the performance of their responsibilities. The legislature also manages the financial affairs of the provincial government by way of the appropriation bills which determine the provincial budget.

== Election ==
The Legislature, like all those in South Africa, is chosen via party list proportional representation, for terms of five years, though may be dissolved earlier under certain conditions. The most recent election was held on 29 May 2024. The following table summarises the results.

Party	Votes	Vote %	Seats
African National Congress	510,994	57.73	23
Economic Freedom Fighters	153,743	18.64	7
DA	117,168	13.24	5
VF+	23,003	2.6	1
MK	18,198	2.06	1
ActionSA	15,053	1.57	1
Other parties	43,500	4.16	0
Total	885,206	100.0	38

The following table shows the composition of the provincial parliament after past elections.

Event	Date	ANC	COPE	DP / DA	EFF	FF/FF+	NP / NNP	UCDP	MK	ActionSA
1994 election	27 April 1994	26	—	0	—	1	3	—	—	—
1999 election	2 June 1999	27	—	1	—	1	1	3	—	—
2004 election	14 April 2004	27	—	2	—	1	0	3	—	—
2009 election	22 April 2009	25	3	3	—	0	—	2	—	—
2014 election	7 May 2014	23	0	4	5	1	—	0	—	—
2019 election	8 May 2019	21	0	4	6	2	—	0	—	—
2024 election	29 May 2024	23	—	5	7	1	—	—	1	1

== Officers ==
The Speaker of the Legislature is Desbo Mohono. The Deputy Speaker is Collen Maine. They are both members of the African National Congress.

Name	Entered office	Left office	Party
Dimotana Thibedi	1994	1999	ANC
Johannes Selapedi	1999	2004	ANC
Thandi Modise	2004	2009	ANC
Nono Maloyi	2009	2012	ANC
Supra Mahumapelo	2012	2014	ANC
Sussana Dantjie	2014	2024	ANC
Desbo Mohono	2024	Incumbent	ANC
