= Government of North West (South African province) =

Provincial government body in South Africa

Government of North West Regering van Noord Wes (Afrikaans) Puso ya Bokone Bophirima (Tswana)
- Polity type: Provincial
- Constitution: Chapter 6 of the Constitution

Legislative branch
- Name: North West Provincial Legislature
- Type: Unicameral
- Presiding officer: Sussana Dantjie,(Speaker)

Executive branch
- Head of government
- Title: Premier
- Currently: Bushy Maape
- Appointer: Provincial Legislature
- Cabinet
- Name: Executive Council
- Appointer: Premier
- Ministries: see Departments

The North West of South Africa is governed in a parliamentary system in which the people elect the North West Provincial Legislature and the legislature elects the premier as head of the executive. The premier leads a cabinet of MECs overseeing various executive departments. The provincial government is subject to the Constitution of South Africa.

== Executive ==
=== Premier ===
The election for the North West Provincial Legislature is held every five years, simultaneously with the election of the National Assembly. At the first meeting of the provincial legislature after an election, the members choose the premier from amongst themselves. The provincial legislature can force the premier to resign by a motion of no confidence. If the premiership becomes vacant (for whatever reason) the provincial legislature must choose a new premier to serve out the period until the next election. One person cannot have served more than two five-year terms as premier; however, when a premier is chosen to fill a vacancy the time until the next election does not count as a term.

In terms specified by the constitution, the executive authority of a province is vested in the premier. The premier appoints an Executive Council made up of ten members of the provincial legislature; they are called members of the Executive Council (MECs). The MECs are practically ministers and the Executive Council a cabinet at the provincial level. The premier has the ability to appoint and dismiss MECs at his/her own discretion.

The premier and the Executive Council are responsible for implementing provincial legislation, along with any national legislation assigned to the province. They set provincial policy and regulate the departments of the provincial government; their actions are subject to the national constitution.

In order for an act of the provincial legislature to become law, the premier must sign it. If he/she believes that the act is unconstitutional, it can be referred back to the legislature for reconsideration. If the premier and the legislature cannot agree, the act must be referred to the Constitutional Court for final consideration.

The premier is also ex officio a member of the National Council of Provinces, the upper house of Parliament, as one of the special delegates from the province.

=== Members of the Executive Council ===
MECs are appointed by the premier from amongst the members of the Provincial Legislative; the premier can also dismiss them. The provincial legislature may force the premier to reconstitute the council by passing a motion of no confidence in the Executive Council excluding the premier; if the legislature passes a motion of no confidence in the Executive Council including the premier, then the premier and the MECs must resign.

=== Departments ===
These are the twelve departments in the North West Provincial Government

Department	Officeholder	Note
Office of the Premier	Bushy Maape	
Agriculture & Rural Development	Desbo Mohono	^{A}
Arts, Culture, Sports & Recreation	Kenetswe Mosenogi	^{B}
Community Safety and Transport Management	Sello Lehari	
Cooperative Governance and Traditional Affairs	Patrick Maloyi	^{C}
Economic Development, Environment, Conservation and Tourism	Galebekwe Tlhapi	^{D}
Education	Viola Motsumi	^{E}
Health	Madoda Sambatha	
Human Settlements	Patrick Maloyi	^{C}
Provincial Treasury	Motlalepula Rosho	
Public Works and Roads	Saliva Molapisi	
Social Development	Lazarus Mokgosi	
Notes: ^A: After the 2019 General Elections the former Department of Rural, Environment and Agricultural Development became the Department of Agriculture and Rural Development.; ^B: After the 2019 General Elections the former Department of Culture, Arts and Traditional Affairs became the Department of Arts, Culture, Sports and Recreation.; ^C: From 2019/20 the Department of Cooperative Governance, Human Settlements and Traditional Affairs has been reorganised into the Department of Cooperative Governance and Traditional Affairs and the Department of Human Settlements. The current officeholder is Patrick Maloyi; ^D: After the 2019 General Election the former North West Department of Tourism was disestablished and incorporated into the new Department of Economic Development, Environment, Conservation and Tourism.; ^E: After the 2019 General Elections the former Department of Education and Sport Development is being reorganised into the Department of Education.

=== Public entities ===
- Mmabana Arts, Culture and Sport Foundation
- North West Development Corporation
- North West Gambling Board
- North West Parks and Tourism Board

== Legislative ==
The provincial legislature are unicameral and have 33 members. The legislature is chaired by a Speaker and a Deputy Speaker.

Number of seats of the Provincial Legislature

=== Power ===
The North West Provincial Legislature elects the premier of North West, the head of the province's executive. The legislature, by passing a motion of no confidence, can force the premier to resign. The legislature may pass a motion of no confidence to compel the premier to reconfigure the Executive Council, even though the Executive Council members are selected by the premier. The legislature also appoints North West's delegates to the National Council of Provinces, allocating delegates to parties in proportion to the number of seats each party holds in the legislature.

The legislature has the power to pass legislation in multiple fields, matters such as health, education (except universities), agriculture, housing, environmental protection, and development planning, all mentioned in the national constitution; in some fields the legislative power is shared with the national parliament, while in others it is reserved to the province alone.

The legislature oversees the administration of the North West provincial government, and the premier and the members of the Executive Council are required to report to the legislature on the performance of their responsibilities. The legislature also manages the financial affairs of the provincial government by way of the appropriation bills which determine the provincial budget.

=== Elections ===
The Members of the Provincial Legislature (MPLs) are elected by party-list proportional representation with a closed list, using the largest remainder method with the Droop quota to allocate any surplus. The usual term of a provincial legislature is five years. Elections are run by the Independent Electoral Commission. Although it is not constitutionally required, thus far all the elections have been held simultaneously with elections to the National Assembly.

== Judiciary ==
=== High Court ===
South Africa has a single national court system, and the administration of justice is the responsibility of the national government. At present the jurisdictional boundaries of the High Courts do not correspond entirely with the provincial boundary; the Superior Courts Bill currently before Parliament will rationalise the courts so that there is a single High Court division in the province.

The provincial executive does play a role in the selection of High Court judges, as the premier of a province is ex officio a member of the Judicial Service Commission when it deals with matters relating to a High Court that sits in that province.

=== Magistrates Court ===
The province is divided into 27 magisterial districts each of which is served by a district magistrate's court. The following towns are seats of magistracy, hosting a district magistrate's court or a detached court of a subdistrict. Regional courts for criminal cases may sit at any of these locations, but regional courts for civil cases sit only at those highlighted in bold text.

City	City	City
Bloemhof	**Brits**	Christiana
Coligny	Delareyville	Ganyesa
**Ga-Rankuwa**	Itsoseng	**Klerksdorp**
Koster	Lehurutshe	Lichtenburg
Madikwe	**Mmabatho**	Mogwase
Mothibistad	Phokeng	**Potchefstroom**
**Rustenburg**	Schweizer-Reneke	Swartruggens
Taung	**Temba**	Ventersdorp
**Vryburg**	Wolmaransstad	Zeerust

In criminal matters a district court has jurisdiction over all offences except treason, murder and rape, and a regional court has jurisdiction over all offences except treason. A district court can impose a fine of not more than R120,000 or a prison sentence of not more than three years, while a regional court can impose a fine of not more than R600,000 or a prison sentence of not more than 15 years, except that for certain offences a regional court can also impose a life sentence. In civil matters a district court has jurisdiction where the value of the claim is R200,000 or less, while a regional court has jurisdiction where the value of the claim is between R200,000 and R400,000. A regional court also has jurisdiction over divorce and related family law matters.

Cases in which no magistrate's court has jurisdiction must be brought before the High Court, which has the inherent jurisdiction to hear any case. The High Court also hears appeals from the magistrates' courts, and cases in which the constitutionality of any law or conduct of the President is brought into question.

== Local government ==
North West Province districts and local municipalities

The North West Province is divided into four district municipalities. The district municipalities are in turn divided into 18 local municipalities:

District Municipality	Municipality
Bojanala Platinum District	Kgetlengriver
Bojanala Platinum District	Madibeng
Bojanala Platinum District	Moretele
Bojanala Platinum District	Moses Kotane
Bojanala Platinum District	Rustenburg
Dr Kenneth Kaunda District	City of Matlosana
Dr Kenneth Kaunda District	JB Marks
Dr Kenneth Kaunda District	Maquassi Hills
Dr Ruth Segomotsi Mompati District	Greater Taung
Dr Ruth Segomotsi Mompati District	Kagisano-Molopo
Dr Ruth Segomotsi Mompati District	Lekwa-Teemane
Dr Ruth Segomotsi Mompati District	Mamusa
Dr Ruth Segomotsi Mompati District	Naledi
Ngaka Modiri Molema District	Ditsobotla
Ngaka Modiri Molema District	Mahikeng
Ngaka Modiri Molema District	Ramotshere
Ngaka Modiri Molema District	Ratlou
Ngaka Modiri Molema District	Tswaing

The Dr Kenneth Kaunda District Municipality is the smallest district in the province, making up 14% of its geographical area. Dr Ruth Segomotsi Mompati District is the largest district in the province, making up almost half of its geographical area.

Rustenburg Local Municipality is the fastest growing municipality in South Africa and the most populous municipality in the North West Province. Kagisano-Molopo is the largest of the five municipalities that make up Dr Ruth Segomatsi Mompati, accounting for just over half of its geographical area.
