= Magistrate's court (South Africa) =

Court of first instance in South Africa

Magistrates' Courts of South Africa
- Native names: 10 other official names: die landdroshowe (Afrikaans); amaKhotho waboMarhastrada (Southern Ndebele); ziiNkundla zeeMantyi (Xhosa); iziNkantolo Zomantshi (Zulu); tiNkantolo taboMantj (Swazi); Dikgorotsheko tša boMmaseterata (Northern Sotho); Makgotla a Bomaseterata (Sotho); Dikgotlatshekelo tsa boMagiseterata (Tswana); Tikhoto ta Vamajisitarata (Tsonga); Khothe dza ha Madzhisiṱaraṱa (Venda)
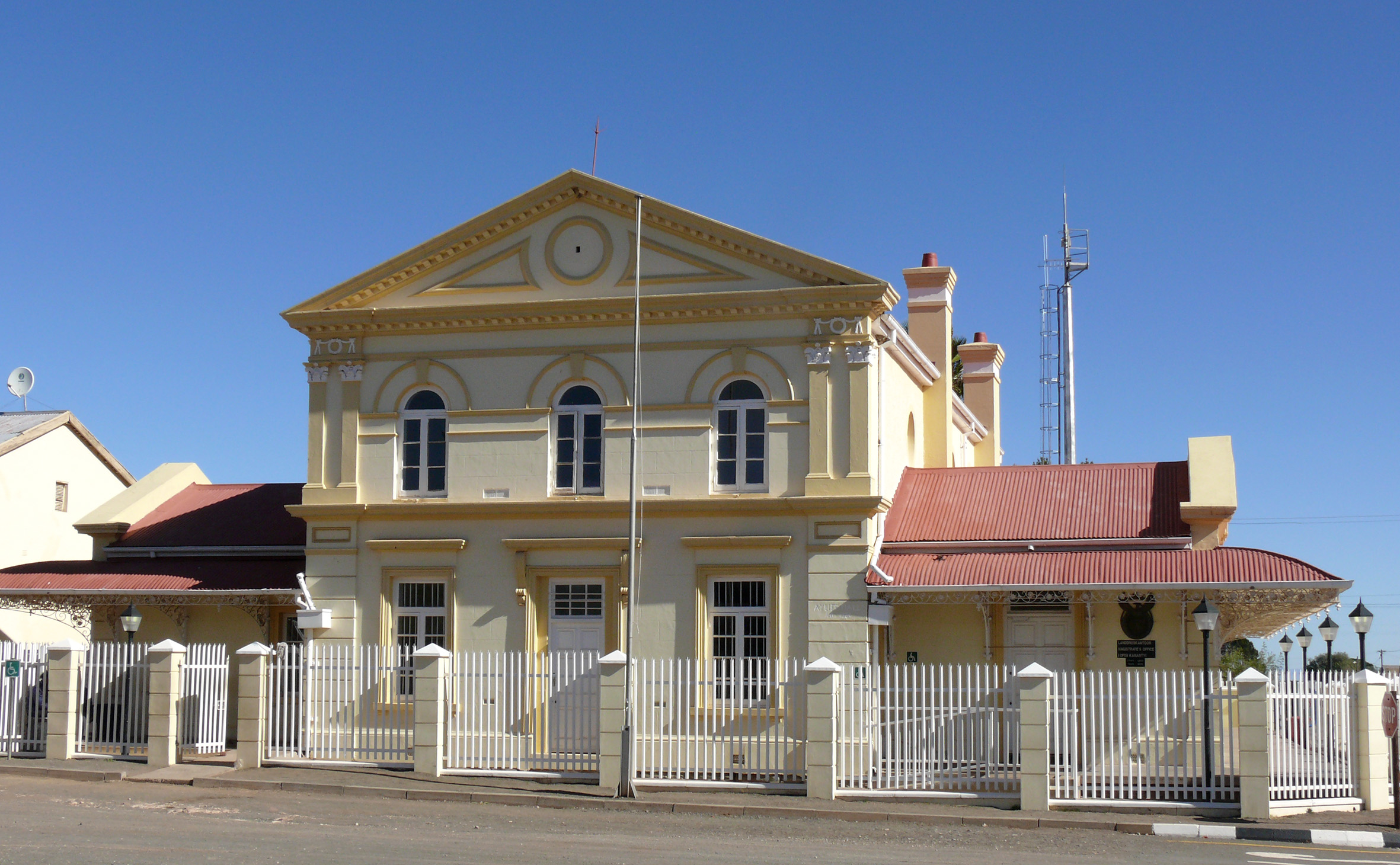
- Magistrate's Court in Hofmeyr in the Eastern Cape
- Jurisdiction: South Africa
- Appeals to: High Court of South Africa
- Website: The Judiciary - Magistrates’ Courts

The magistrates' courts are the lowest level of the court system in South Africa. They are the courts of first instance for most criminal cases except for the most serious crimes, and for civil cases where the value of the claim is below a fixed monetary limit.

== Divisions and districts ==
South Africa is divided into magisterial districts and sub-districts, each of which is served by a district magistrate's court and in some cases also branch courts or periodical courts. Districts are grouped together into regional divisions served by a regional court, which hears more serious cases. At present there is one regional division established for each province, and the regional court sits at multiple locations throughout the province. As of July 2026 there were 509 district, sub-district and branch courts. As of 2025 there were 1,717 magistrates including 320 regional magistrates.

== Jurisdiction ==
In criminal matters a district court has jurisdiction over all offences except treason, murder and rape, and a regional court has jurisdiction over all offences except treason. A district court can impose a fine of not more than R120,000 or a prison sentence of not more than three years, while a regional court can impose a fine of not more than R600,000 or a prison sentence of not more than 15 years, except that for certain offences a regional court can also impose a life sentence. In civil matters a district court has jurisdiction where the value of the claim is R200,000 or less, while a regional court has jurisdiction where the value of the claim is between R200,000 and R400,000. A regional court also has jurisdiction over divorce and related family law matters.

Cases in which no magistrate's court has jurisdiction must be brought before the High Court, which has the inherent jurisdiction to hear any case. The High Court also hears appeals from the magistrates' courts, and cases in which the constitutionality of any law or conduct of the President is brought into question.

== List of magistrates' courts ==
The following towns host a district magistrate's court, a detached court of a sub-district, or a branch court.

=== Eastern Cape ===
- Adelaide
- Alexandria
- Alice
- Bedford
- Bityi
- Burgersdorp
- Cacadu (Lady Frere)
- Cala
- Cathcart
- Centane (Kentani)
- Cofimvaba
- Cumakala (Stutterheim)
- Dimbaza
- Dordrecht
- Dutywa
- Ekhephini (Barkly East)
- eMaxesibeni (Mount Ayliff)
- Ezibeleni
- Flagstaff
- Gcuwa (Butterworth)
- Gelvandale
- Gqeberha (Port Elizabeth)
- Graaff-Reinet
- Hankey
- Hofmeyr
- Humansdorp
- Indwe
- Jamestown
- Jansenville
- Joubertina
- Kariega
- Keiskammahoek
- Khowa (Elliot)
- Komani (Queenstown)
- Komga
- KuGompo City (East London)
- KwaBhaca (Mount Frere)
- KwaMaqoma (Fort Beaufort)
- KwaNobuhle
- KwaNojoli (Somerset East)
- Lady Grey
- Libode
- Lusikisiki
- Makhanda (Grahamstown)
- Maletswai (Aliwal North)
- Maloti
- Matatiele
- Mbizana
- Mdantsane
- Middelburg
- Middledrift
- Molteno
- Motherwell
- Mpofu (Seymour)
- Mqanduli
- Mthatha
- New Brighton
- Ngcobo
- Ngqamakhwe
- Ngqeleni
- Nqanqarhu (Maclear)
- Nqweba (Kirkwood)
- Ntabankulu
- Ntabethemba
- Nxuba (Cradock)
- Pearston
- Peddie
- Port Alfred
- Port St. Johns
- Qonce (King William's Town)
- Qumbu
- Sterkspruit
- Sterkstroom
- Steynsburg
- Steytlerville
- Tarkastad
- Tlokoeng (Mount Fletcher)
- Tsolo
- Tsomo
- Venterstad
- Whittlesea
- Willowmore
- Willowvale
- Xamdeboo (Aberdeen)
- Xhora (Elliotdale)
- Zwelitsha

=== Free State ===
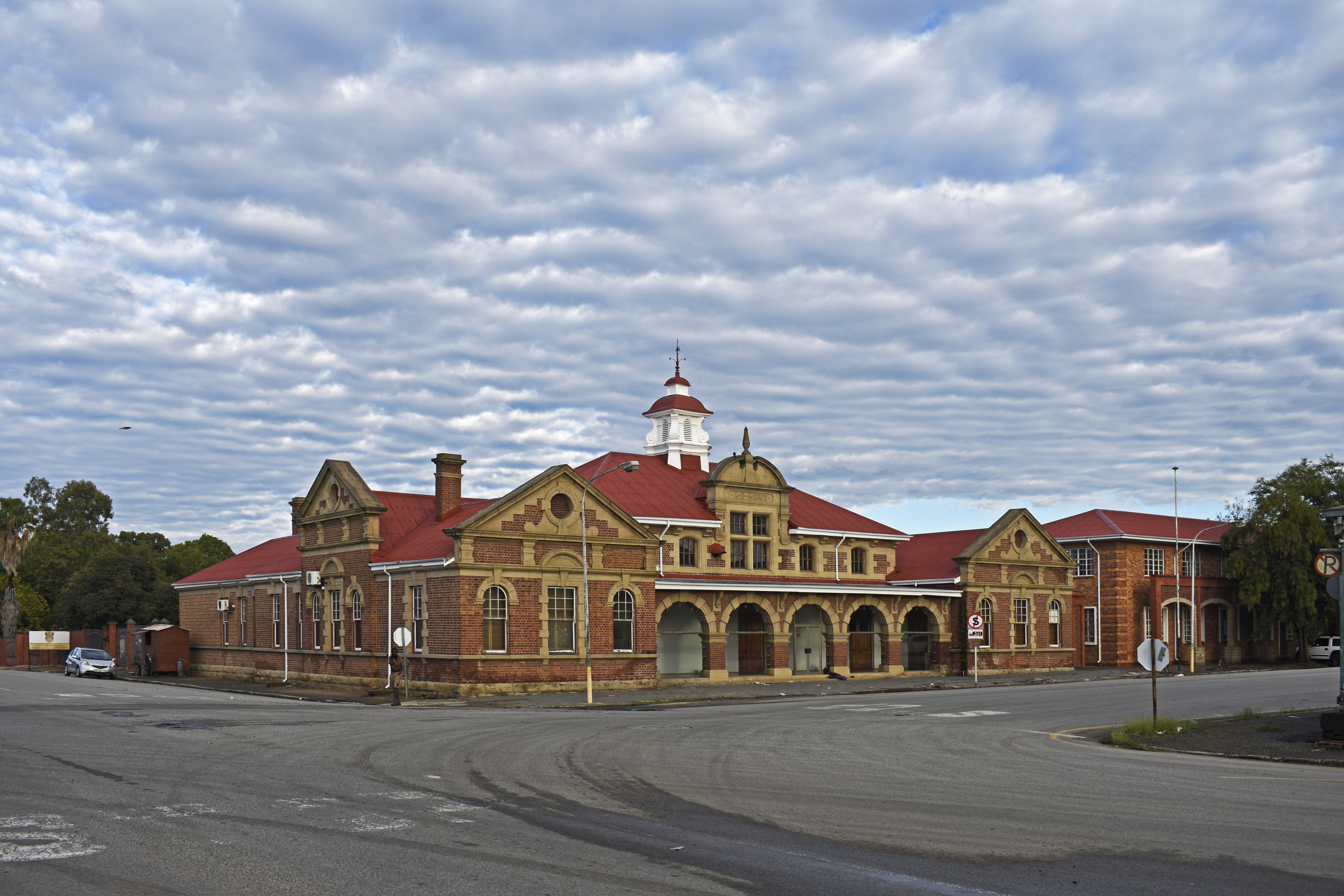
Kroonstad Magistrate's Court

- Bethlehem
- Bethulie
- Bloemfontein
- Boshof
- Bothaville
- Botshabelo
- Brandfort
- Bultfontein
- Dealesville
- Dewetsdorp
- Edenburg
- Edenville
- Excelsior
- Fauresmith
- Ficksburg
- Fouriesburg
- Frankfort
- Harrismith
- Heilbron
- Hennenman
- Hertzogville
- Hlohlolwane (Clocolan)
- Hobhouse
- Hoopstad
- Jacobsdal
- Jagersfontein
- Kestell
- Koffiefontein
- Koppies
- Kroonstad
- Ladybrand
- Lindley
- Makwane
- Mamafubedu (Petrus Steyn)
- Marquard
- Memel
- Odendaalsrus
- Parys
- Paul Roux
- Petrusburg
- Philippolis
- Phuthaditjhaba
- Reddersburg
- Reitz
- Rosendal
- Rouxville
- Sasolburg
- Senekal
- Smithfield
- Springfontein
- Steynsrus
- Thaba Nchu
- Theunissen
- Trompsburg
- Tseki
- Tsheseng
- Tweespruit
- Ventersburg
- Viljoenskroon
- Villiers
- Virginia
- Vrede
- Vredefort
- Warden
- Welkom
- Wepener
- Wesselsbron
- Winburg
- Zastron

=== Gauteng ===
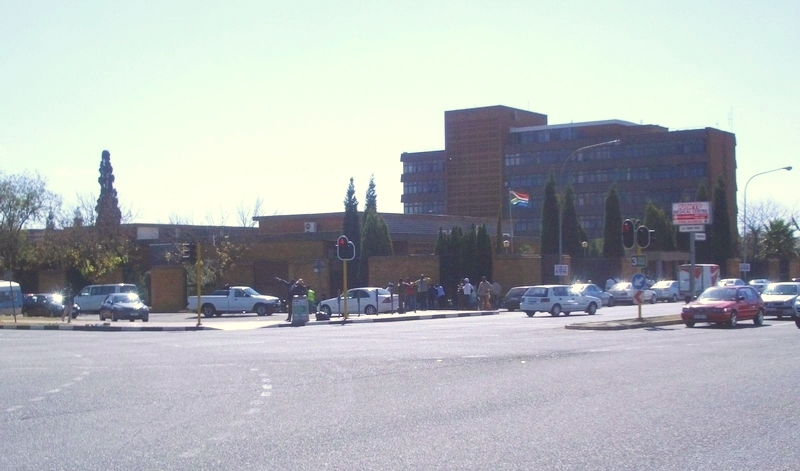
Kempton Park Magistrate's Court

- Alexandra
- Atteridgeville
- Benoni
- Boksburg
- Booysens
- Brakpan
- Brixton
- Bronkhorstspruit
- Cullinan
- Daveyton
- Diepsloot
- Edenvale
- Ekangala
- Fochville
- Ga-Rankuwa
- Germiston
- Hatfield
- Heidelberg
- Hillbrow
- Jeppestown
- Johannesburg
- Kagiso
- Kempton Park
- Khutsong
- Kliptown
- Krugersdorp
- Lenasia
- Mamelodi
- Meadowlands
- Meyerton
- Midrand
- Newlands
- Nigel
- Oberholzer
- Orlando
- Palm Ridge (Alberton)
- Pretoria
- Pretoria North
- Randburg
- Randfontein
- Roodepoort
- Sebokeng
- Soshanguve
- Soweto
- Springs
- Temba
- Tembisa
- Tsakane
- Vanderbijlpark
- Vereeniging
- Vosloorus
- Westonaria

=== KwaZulu-Natal ===
- Babanango
- Bergville
- Camperdown
- Charlestown
- Chatsworth
- Colenso
- Dannhauser
- Dududu
- Dukuza
- Dundee
- Durban
- eDumbe (Paulpietersburg)
- Emlazi
- eManzimtoti (Amanzimtoti)
- Empangeni
- eMthonjaneni (Melmoth)
- eNyoni
- Eshowe
- eSikhawini
- Estcourt
- eXobho (Ixopo)
- Ezakheni
- eZinqoleni
- Glencoe
- Greytown
- Hammarsdale
- Harding
- Himeville
- Hlabisa
- Howick
- Impendle
- Ingwavuma
- Inkanyezi
- Kokstad
- Kranskop
- KwaDukuza
- KwaMsane
- Ladysmith
- Louwsburg
- Madadeni
- Magudu
- Manguzi
- Mapumulo
- Mooi River
- Msinga
- Mtubatuba
- Mtunzini
- Ncotshane
- Ndwedwe
- New Hanover
- Newcastle
- Newlands
- Ngwelezane
- Nkandla
- Nongoma
- Nqutu
- Nsimbini
- Nsuze
- Ntuzuma
- Phoenix
- Phungashe
- Pietermaritzburg
- Pinetown
- Point
- Polela
- Pomeroy
- Pongola
- Port Shepstone
- Richards Bay
- Richmond
- Sawoti
- Scottburgh
- Ubombo
- Ulundi
- Umbumbulu
- Umzimkulu
- Umzinto
- Umzumbe
- Utrecht
- Verulam
- Vryheid
- Wasbank
- Weenen
- Wentworth
- Winterton

=== Limpopo ===
- Bela-Bela
- Dzanani
- Ga-Kgapane
- Giyani
- Groblersdal
- Hoedspruit
- Lebowakgomo
- Lenyenye
- Lephalale
- Louis Trichardt
- Lulekani
- Mahwelereng
- Malamulele
- Mankweng
- Matlerekeng
- Modimolle
- Mokopane
- Mookgophong
- Morebeng
- Moutse
- Musina
- Mutale
- Namakgale
- Nebo
- Nkowankowa
- Northam
- Phalaborwa
- Phalala
- Polokwane
- Praktiseer
- Sekhukhune
- Senwabarwana
- Senwamokgope
- Seshego
- Thabazimbi
- Thohoyandou
- Tiyani
- Tshilwavhusiku
- Tshitale
- Tzaneen
- Vuwani
- Waterval

=== Mpumalanga ===
- Acornhoek
- Amersfoort
- Balfour
- Barberton
- Bethal
- Breyten
- Bushbuckridge
- Carolina
- Delmas
- Dirkiesdorp
- Elukwatini (Eerstehoek)
- eMakhazeni (Belfast)
- eMalahleni (Witbank)
- Emgwenya (Waterval Boven)
- eMkhondo (Piet Retief)
- eMvelo (Amsterdam)
- Ermelo
- Evander
- Ga-Nala (Kriel)
- Kabokweni
- KaNyamazane
- Komatipoort
- Kwaggafontein
- KwaMhlanga
- Mashishing (Lydenburg)
- Masoyi
- Mbibana
- Mbombela (Nelspruit)
- Middelburg
- Mkhuhlu
- Sabie
- Secunda
- Siyabuswa
- Standerton
- Thulamahashe
- Tonga
- Volksrust
- Vosman
- Wakkerstroom
- White River

=== North West ===
- Atamelang
- Bloemhof
- Brits
- Christiana
- Coligny
- Delareyville
- Ganyesa
- Groot Marico
- Itsoseng
- Kgomotso
- Klerksdorp
- Koster
- Lehurutshe
- Lichtenburg
- Madikwe
- Mankwe
- Marikana
- Mmabatho (Mahikeng)
- Orkney
- Ottosdal
- Ottoshoop
- Potchefstroom
- Rustenburg
- Schweizer-Reneke
- Setlagole
- Stilfontein
- Swartruggens
- Taung
- Tlhabane
- Ventersdorp
- Vryburg
- Wolmaransstad
- Zeerust

=== Northern Cape ===
- Barkly West
- Britstown
- Calvinia
- Carnarvon
- Colesberg
- De Aar
- Douglas
- Fraserburg
- Galeshewe
- Garies
- Griekwastad
- Groblershoop
- Hanover
- Hartswater
- Heuningvlei
- Hopetown
- Jan Kempdorp
- Kakamas
- Kathu
- Keimoes
- Kenhardt
- Kimberley
- Kudumane (Mothibistad)
- Kuruman
- Noupoort
- Olifantshoek
- Pampierstad
- Philipstown
- Pofadder
- Port Nolloth
- Postmasburg
- Prieska
- Richmond
- Springbok
- Sutherland
- Tsineng
- Upington
- Victoria West
- Warrenton
- Williston

=== Western Cape ===
Stellenbosch magistrate's court

- Albertinia
- Athlone
- Atlantis
- Beaufort West
- Bellville
- Bishop Lavis
- Blue Downs
- Bonnievale
- Bredasdorp
- Caledon
- Calitzdorp
- Cape Town
- Ceres
- Clanwilliam
- Fezeka (Gugulethu)
- George
- Goodwood
- Grabouw
- Heidelberg
- Hermanus
- Hopefield
- Khayelitsha
- Knysna
- Kuils River
- Laaiplek (Velddrif)
- Ladismith
- Laingsburg
- Malmesbury
- Mitchell's Plain
- Montagu
- Moorreesburg
- Mossel Bay
- Muizenberg
- Murraysburg
- Oudtshoorn
- Paarl
- Philippi
- Piketberg
- Plettenberg Bay
- Porterville
- Prince Albert
- Riversdale
- Robertson
- Simon's Town
- Somerset West
- Stellenbosch
- Strand
- Swellendam
- Thembalethu
- Tulbagh
- Uniondale
- Vanrhynsdorp
- Villiersdorp
- Vredenburg
- Vredendal
- Wellington
- Wolseley
- Worcester
- Wynberg

== See also ==
- Courts of South Africa
