= Sannieshof =

- Location within North West (South African province) Location within South Africa
- Coordinates: 26°32′S 25°48′E
- Country: South Africa
- Province: North West
- District: Ngaka Modiri Molema
- Municipality: Tswaing
- Established: 1928

Area
  - Total: 5.42 km^{2} (2.09 sq mi)

Population (2011)
  - Total: 11,016
  - Density: 2,030/km^{2} (5,260/sq mi)

Racial makeup (2011)
  - Black African: 89.3%
  - Coloured: 2.1%
  - Indian/Asian: 0.4%
  - White: 7.7%
  - Other: 0.5%

First languages (2011)
  - Tswana: 80.9%
  - Afrikaans: 8.2%
  - Xhosa: 3.4%
  - English: 1.7%
  - Other: 5.9%
- Time zone: UTC+2 (SAST)
- Postal code (street): 2760
- PO box: 2760
- Area code: 018

Sannieshof is a small farming town situated in North West Province of South Africa. It started as a post office to serve the farms in the district and was named in honour of the first postmaster, John Voorendijk's wife Sannie. The village is 40 km north-east of Delareyville and 38 km north-west of Ottosdal. It is also close (20 km) to Baberspan which is a water bird sanctuary and a fishing mecca.

== History ==
The name was bestowed by John Voorendijk in 1920 who was postmaster of Lichtenburg, in honour of his wife Sannie (née De Beer), whom he married in 1904. In 1928, land was sold to form a village that was named Roosville after a local politician Tielman Roos. The name was disliked and the town regained its original name in 1952.

== See also ==
- Battle of Tweebosch
