= Geysdorp =

- Location within North West (South African province) Location within South Africa Location within Africa
- Coordinates: 26.533°S 25.3°E
- Country: South Africa
- Province: North West
- District: Ngaka Modiri Molema
- Municipality: Tswaing
- Established: 1895

Area
  - Total: 3.58 km^{2} (1.38 sq mi)

Population (2011)
  - Total: 1,365
  - Density: 381/km^{2} (988/sq mi)

Racial makeup (2011)
  - Black African: 96.0%
  - Coloured: 2.5%
  - Indian/Asian: 0.3%
  - White: 1.2%

First languages (2011)
  - Tswana: 91.1%
  - Sotho: 2.6%
  - Afrikaans: 2.1%
  - Zulu: 1.2%
  - Other: 3.1%
- Time zone: UTC+2 (SAST)
- PO box: 2771
- Area code: 053

Geysdorp Nkwane is a farming town in Tswaing Local Municipality in the North West province of South Africa, it has 2 Schools (Old HTS Geysdorp, Duikerbos), Garage station, Silos, mini suburb cottages, new location (Duikerbos) and village(Boschrand). The town is in the former Western Transvaal, some 24 km south-west of Delareyville.

== History ==
It was laid out in 1895 on the farm "Paardefontein". Probably named after Commandant Nicolaas Claudius Gey van Pittius (1837–1893), Administrator of the Boer republic of Goshen.
