= Rietpan =

- Location within North West (South African province) Location within South Africa
- Coordinates: 25.111°S 25.943°E
- Country: South Africa
- Province: North West
- District: Ngaka Modiri Molema
- Municipality: Ramotshere Moiloa

Area
  - Total: 2.33 km^{2} (0.90 sq mi)

Population (2001)
  - Total: 2,045
  - Density: 878/km^{2} (2,270/sq mi)
- Time zone: UTC+2 (SAST)

Rietpan is a town in Ngaka Modiri Molema District Municipality in the North West province of South Africa.
