= Ga-Motlatla =

Village in North-West, South Africa

- Village
- Ga-Motlatla
- Location within North West (South African province) Location within South Africa Location within Africa Location within Earth
- Coordinates: 26.07197°S 26.57219°E
- Country: South Africa
- Province: North West
- District: Ngaka Modiri Molema
- Municipality: Ditsobotla Municipality

Area
  - Total: 2.37 km^{2} (0.92 sq mi)

Population (2001)
  - Total: 1,392
  - Density: 587/km^{2} (1,520/sq mi)

Racial makeup (2001)
  - Black African: 99.57%
  - Coloured: 0.43%

First languages (2001)
  - Setswana: 96.12%
  - Sesotho: 1.72%
  - Afrikaans: 1.51%
  - English: 0.22%
  - Sepedi: 0.22%
  - isiNdebele: 0.22%
- Time zone: UTC+2 (SAST)
- PO box: 2714
- Area code: 014
- Website: Official website

Ga-Motlatla (or simply Motlatla), is a village under Ditsobotla Local Municipality of the Ngaka Modiri Molema District situated in the North West province of South Africa.
