= Magome Masike =

South African politician

Member of the North West Executive Council for Health
- In office 25 November 2010 – 6 December 2018
- Premier: Thandi Modise; Supra Mahumapelo; Job Mokgoro
- Preceded by: Rebecca Kasienyane
- Succeeded by: Madoda Sambatha

Personal details
- Citizenship: South Africa
- Party: African National Congress

Magome Albanos Masike is a South African politician and businessman who served as the North West's Member of the Executive Council (MEC) for Health from November 2010 to December 2018, becoming the province's longest-serving Health MEC. He was fired from the Executive Council by Job Mokgoro and did not seek re-election to the North West Provincial Legislature in 2019. He is a member of the African National Congress (ANC).

== Political career ==
Masike was formerly the Mayor of Matlosana Local Municipality in the North West; after he resigned, he was succeeded in the mayoral office by China Dodovu. At the time of the 2009 general election, he was working as a businessman and he was not initially elected to a legislative seat. However, in early November 2010, the ANC amended its provincial party list for the North West, installing Masike near the top and thereby enabling him to join the North West Provincial Legislature if casual vacancies arose.

On 25 November 2010, newly elected North West Premier Thandi Modise announced that he would join the North West Executive Council as Member of the Executive Council (MEC) for Health. He remained in that portfolio throughout Modise's premiership. In the 2014 general election, he was ranked fourth on the ANC's party list and secured election to a full term in the provincial legislature; he was also reappointed as MEC for Health by Modise's successor, Premier Supra Mahumapelo.

In 2018, Mahumapelo was replaced by Job Mokgoro, who initially retained Mahumapelo's Executive Council; however, in his first reshuffle on 6 December 2018, Mokgoro fired Masike, replacing him with Madoda Sambatha. Masike did not stand for re-election to the provincial legislature in the 2019 general election.
