= Pachsdraai =

Pachsdraai(Ga - Mogopa)
- Location within North West (South African province) Location within South Africa
- Coordinates: 25.206°S 26.394°E
- Country: South Africa
- Province: North West
- District: Ngaka Modiri Molema
- Municipality: Ramotshere Moiloa

Area
  - Total: 3.16 km^{2} (1.22 sq mi)

Population (2025)
  - Total: 3,000
  - Density: 950/km^{2} (2,500/sq mi)

Racial makeup (2011)
  - Black African: 98.3%
  - Indian/Asian: 0.3%
  - White: 1.2%
  - Other: 0.1%

First languages (2011)
  - Tswana: 93.6%
  - English: 1.6%
  - Afrikaans: 1.5%
  - Other: 3.4%
- Time zone: UTC+2 (SAST)

Pachsdraai is a town in Ngaka Modiri Molema District Municipality in the North West province of South Africa.
