= Doornlaagte =

- Location within North West (South African province) Location within South Africa
- Coordinates: 25.239°S 26.329°E
- Country: South Africa
- Province: North West
- District: Ngaka Modiri Molema
- Municipality: Ramotshere Moiloa

Area
  - Total: 1.05 km^{2} (0.41 sq mi)

Population (2011)
  - Total: 776
  - Density: 739/km^{2} (1,910/sq mi)

Racial makeup (2011)
  - Black African: 98.2%
  - Coloured: 1.4%
  - Indian/Asian: 0.4%

First languages (2011)
  - Tswana: 96.5%
  - Afrikaans: 1.5%
  - Other: 1.9%
- Time zone: UTC+2 (SAST)

Doornlaagte is a village in Ngaka Modiri Molema District Municipality in the North West province of South Africa.
