= Supra Mahumapelo =

South African politician and singer (born 1968)

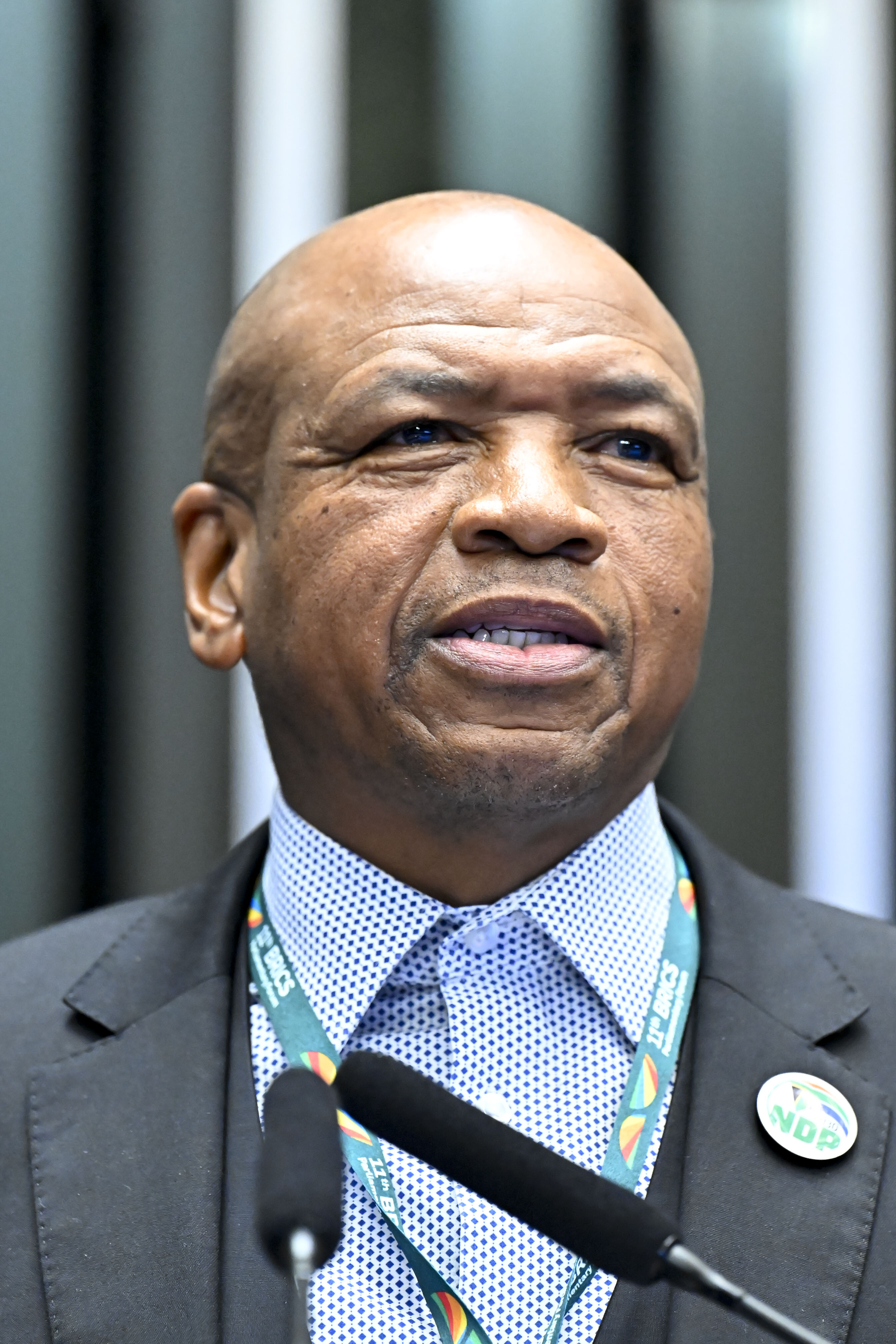

5th Premier of North West
- In office 21 May 2014 – 23 May 2018
- Preceded by: Thandi Modise
- Succeeded by: Wendy Nelson (acting); Job Mokgoro

Speaker of the North West Provincial Legislature
- In office 3 April 2012 – 6 May 2014
- Preceded by: Nono Maloyi
- Succeeded by: Sussana Dantjie

Member of the North West Provincial Legislature
- In office February 2012 – 22 June 2018

Personal details
- Born: Supra Bokeng Ramoeletsi Mahumapelo; 7 June 1968 (age 58) Manamolela, Delareyville, North West, South Africa
- Party: African National Congress
- Spouse(s): Kule Mahumapelo; Christina Kgari
- Children: 4
- Education: Technikon Northern Transvaal; University of South Africa; University of Port Elizabeth

Supra Obakeng Ramoeletsi Mahumapelo (born 7 June 1968) is a South African politician and singer who was Premier of North West from May 2014 to May 2018 during the 5th North West Provincial Legislature. He formerly served as Speaker of the North West Provincial Legislature from April 2012 to May 2014.

Mahumapelo was the Provincial Secretary of the African National Congress (ANC) in the North West from 2005 to 2009 and its Provincial Chairperson from 2011 to 2018. He resigned as Premier in May 2018 amid violent protests calling for his resignation.

== Early life and education ==
Supra Mahumapelo was born on 7 June 1968 in Manamolelo outside Delareyville in the Western Transvaal. His mother, Agnes Matlakala Bereng, was a domestic worker who worked in Klerksdorp and later in Helderkruin, Roodepoort. She was forced by her son to leave her domestic work in 1995. His father, Stephen Kalagongwe Mahumapelo, was an entrepreneur in Saulspoort near Rustenburg. Mahumapelo was the herd boy of his village.

He started his schooling at Marotse Primary School and later attended Tlotlego Middle School in the Atamelang township. He spent his high school years in Phatshima High School in Atamelang and matriculated at Kgamanyane High School in Moruleng.

After matric, Mahumapelo went to the former Transvaal Northern Technikon and obtained a National Diploma in Commercial Practice (NDCom). At the University of South Africa, he then did a Certificate in Public Finance and Economics. He then obtained his master's degree in Political Economy at the University of Port Elizabeth.

== Removal as Premier ==
In early 2018, the North West was wracked by violent service delivery protests calling for Mahumapelo to step down as Premier, as well as by province-wide strikes by the National Education, Health and Allied Workers' Union. During the same period, the Economic Freedom Fighters proposed a motion of no confidence in Mahumapelo in the North West Provincial Legislature.

In late April 2018, the cabinet of President Cyril Ramaphosa announced that it would exercise its constitutional prerogative to place the province's finance and health departments under national administration. In May, the entire provincial government was placed under administration, under a team led by Minister in the Presidency Nkosazana Dlamini-Zuma; it was the first time ever that the measure had been applied to an entire province. Ramaphosa also appointed an inter-ministerial task team to investigate violent protests in the province's capital, Mahikeng, and other towns through the province over a long period of time. which ultimately revealed a range of weaknesses across the provincial government and in municipalities. These included poor governance practices‚ skills shortages‚ incompetence‚ corruption and questionable supply chain management practices.

On 9 May 2018, Wendy Nelson was appointed as acting Premier of the province while Mahumapelo took a leave of absence. On 23 May, Mahumapelo announced that he would "embark on early retirement" and step down as Premier. On 22 June, Mahumapelo also resigned from his seat in the provincial legislature, ceding his seat to a new member, Job Mokgoro, who was subsequently elected to succeed him as Premier. Mahumapelo was appointed to head the ANC's provincial political school.
