= Mynhardt =

Mynhardt is a surname. Notable people with this name include:

- Amanda Mynhardt (born 1986), South African netball player
- Kieka Mynhardt, South African and Canadian mathematician
- Patrick Mynhardt (1932–2007), South African actor
- Siegfried Mynhardt (1906–1996), South African actor

== See also ==
- Mynhardt Kawanivi (born 1984), Namibian long-distance runner
