= Slurry, South Africa =

Slurry
- Location within North West (South African province) Location within South Africa
- Coordinates: 25.816667°S 25.85°E
- Country: South Africa
- Province: North West
- District: Ngaka Modiri Molema
- Municipality: Mahikeng

Area
  - Total: 33.21 km^{2} (12.82 sq mi)

Population (2011)
  - Total: 587
  - Density: 17.7/km^{2} (45.8/sq mi)

Racial makeup (2011)
  - Black African: 70.3%
  - Coloured: 3.8%
  - Indian/Asian: 6.3%
  - White: 19.6%

First languages (2011)
  - Tswana: 55.2%
  - Afrikaans: 22.3%
  - English: 9.2%
  - Zulu: 6.3%
  - Other: 7.0%
- Time zone: UTC+2 (SAST)
- PO box: 2895
- Area code: 018

Slurry is a settlement in Ngaka Modiri Molema District Municipality in the North West province of South Africa.

Slurry is a village with a large cement factory, 22 km north-east of Mafikeng and 15 km south-west of Ottoshoop. It was named after the mixture of limestone and other components in the manufacture of cement.
