= Leeufontein =

- Location within North West (South African province) Location within South Africa
- Coordinates: 26.126°S 25.331°E
- Country: South Africa
- Province: North West
- District: Ngaka Modiri Molema
- Municipality: Ramotshere Moiloa

Area
  - Total: 10.85 km^{2} (4.19 sq mi)

Population (2001)
  - Total: 5,685
  - Density: 524.0/km^{2} (1,357/sq mi)

Racial makeup (2001)
  - Black African: 99.6%
  - Coloured: 0.2%
  - Indian/Asian: 0.2%

First languages (2001)
  - Tswana: 98.6%
- Time zone: UTC+2 (SAST)
- Postal code (street): 0449

Leeufontein is a town in Ngaka Modiri Molema District Municipality in the North West province of South Africa.
