= Nyoni =

Nyoni may refer to:

== Places ==
- Nyoni, Kenya, eastern Kenya
- Samuel Nyoni, northern Malawi
- Nyoni, Tanzania, southwestern Tanzania
- Nyoni Garden, garden in Kampala, Uganda
- Nyoni, KwaZulu-Natal, eastern South Africa

== People ==
- Erasto Nyoni (born 1988), Tanzanian footballer
- Oscar Nyoni, Zambia Air force Commander
- Sithembiso Nyoni, Zimbabwean politician
- Trey Nyoni (born 2007), English footballer
- Vuza Nyoni (born 1984), Zimbabwean footballer
