= Ganalaagte =

- Location within North West (South African province) Location within South Africa
- Coordinates: 26.464°S 25.530°E
- Country: South Africa
- Province: North West
- District: Ngaka Modiri Molema
- Municipality: Tswaing

Area
  - Total: 2.92 km^{2} (1.13 sq mi)

Population (2011)
  - Total: 2,830
  - Density: 969/km^{2} (2,510/sq mi)

Racial makeup (2011)
  - Black African: 98.8%
  - Coloured: 0.6%
  - Indian/Asian: 0.4%
  - Other: 0.2%

First languages (2011)
  - Tswana: 96.9%
  - Xhosa: 1.1%
  - Other: 2.0%
- Time zone: UTC+2 (SAST)

Ganalaagte is a village in Ngaka Modiri Molema District Municipality in the North West province of South Africa.
