= Makouspan =

- Suburb
- Location within South Africa
- Coordinates: 26.09618°S 25.6198273°E
- Country: South Africa

Makouspan is a small suburb along National Road R503 in South Africa, near the border of the larger town of Itsoseng.

== See also ==
- Economy of South Africa
- History of South Africa
