= Thandi Modise =

South African politician (born 1959)

The Honourable Thandi Modise
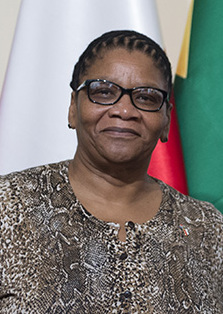

Minister of Defence and Military Veterans
- In office 5 August 2021 – 19 June 2024
- President: Cyril Ramaphosa
- Deputy: Thabang Makwetla
- Preceded by: Nosiviwe Mapisa-Nqakula
- Succeeded by: Angie Motshekga

6th Speaker of the National Assembly of South Africa
- In office 22 May 2019 – 5 August 2021
- President: Cyril Ramaphosa
- Deputy: Solomon Lechesa Tsenoli
- Preceded by: Baleka Mbete
- Succeeded by: Nosiviwe Mapisa-Nqakula

5th Chairperson of the National Council of Provinces
- In office 22 May 2014 – 22 May 2019
- Deputy: Raseriti Tau
- Preceded by: Mninwa Johannes Mahlangu
- Succeeded by: Amos Masondo

4th Premier of North West
- In office 19 November 2010 – 20 May 2014
- Preceded by: Maureen Modiselle
- Succeeded by: Supra Mahumapelo
Legislative offices 2010–present
Member of the National Assembly of South Africa
In office 22 May 2019 – 28 May 2024
Delegate to the National Council of Provinces
In office 22 May 2014 – 7 May 2019
Constituency	North West
Member of the North West Provincial Legislature
In office 19 November 2010 – 20 May 2014
Party offices
Deputy Secretary-General of the African National Congress
In office 16 December 2007 – December 2012
President	Jacob Zuma
Secretary-General	Gwede Mantashe
Preceded by	Sankie Mthembi-Mahanyele
Succeeded by	Jessie Duarte
2nd Deputy President of the African National Congress Women's League
In office 1993–2003
President	Winnie Madikizela-Mandela
Preceded by	Albertina Sisulu
Succeeded by	Mavivi Myakayaka-Manzini

Personal details
- Born: Thandi Ruth Modise; 25 December 1959 (age 66) Vryburg, Cape Province, Union of South Africa
- Party: African National Congress

Military service
- Allegiance: uMkhonto we Sizwe
- Years of service: 1976–1979
- Rank: Commander

Thandi Ruth Modise (born 25 December 1959) is a South African politician who served as the Minister of Defence and Military Veterans from 2021 to 2024. She was previously the Premier of the North West from 2010 to 2014, Chairperson of the National Council of Provinces from 2014 to 2019, and Speaker of the National Assembly from 2019 to 2021.

Modise has been a member of the African National Congress (ANC) since the 1976 Soweto uprising, when she dropped out of high school to join uMkhonto we Sizwe (MK), the ANC's armed wing, in exile. In 1978 she returned to South Africa as a trained guerrilla operative for MK and from 1980 to 1988 she was imprisoned under the Terrorism Act for her anti-apartheid activism.

She was elected to the South African Parliament in South Africa's first democratic election in 1994. After ten years in the National Assembly, she served as the Speaker of the North West Provincial Legislature from 2004 to 2009 before becoming Premier in 2010. She next returned to the executive branch of government in August 2021, when President Cyril Ramaphosa appointed her to replace Nosiviwe Mapisa-Nqakula as Defence Minister.

Modise has also held various senior positions in the ANC, including as Deputy President of the ANC Women's League from 1993 to 2003 under Winnie Madikizela-Mandela and as Deputy Secretary-General of the ANC from 2007 to 2012 under Jacob Zuma. She was first elected to the ANC National Executive Committee in December 1994, and she was re-elected to another five-year term on the committee in December 2022.

== Early life and activism ==
Modise was born on 25 December 1959 in Huhudi, a township near Vryburg in what is now the North West province (then the northern part of the Cape province). Her father, Frans Modise, was a railway worker (a stoker) and a member of the African National Congress (ANC), which was banned by the apartheid government the year after Modise's birth. She was the youngest of six children.

Modise was educated at Barolong High School until she dropped out in July 1976 during the Soweto uprising. The student protests were given particular fervor in Huhudi because of the imminent threat that the township would be incorporated into the so-called independent homeland of Bophuthatswana. Later in July, Modise, with some former classmates, fled to Botswana, crossing the border by foot, and joined the ANC in exile.

=== Umkhonto we Sizwe: 1976–1979 ===
Modise received preliminary political education in Tanzania and then received military training at various Umkhonto we Sizwe (MK) camps in Angola and later in Maputo, Mozambique, becoming one of the few women in MK's famous "June 16" detachment. After her training she worked in MK camps as a political commissar, a section commissar, and ultimately a commander. She also sang soprano in a recreational MK choir.

In January 1978, shortly after her 19th birthday, Modise used a false passport to cross the Swazi border into South Africa, where she worked underground as an MK operative. She had received topographical training and her primary task was reconnaissance of potential targets for sabotage and other guerrilla attacks. She was based variously in Johannesburg, in Diepkloof, Soweto, and in Eldorado Park, and she occasionally crossed back into Swaziland to report back to the MK regional command stationed there. Over the course of two days in March 1978, she planted homemade incendiary devices, concealed in matchboxes, inside two OK Bazaars and Edgars stores in Johannesburg.

=== Detention: 1979–1988 ===
Modise was arrested on 31 October 1979 in Eldorado Park, where she was completing a new MK assignment which involved political mobilisation through a network of underground ANC cells in the area. According to the police, she was arrested on the basis of a tip-off which identified her as a terrorist. She was detained without trial during five months of interrogation at the notorious John Vorster Square. She later told a judge that, though she was pregnant during the first months of her detention, she had been intimidated and assaulted by police officers.

She and her co-accused first appeared in the Johannesburg Magistrate's Court in May 1980. Modise faced various charges related to her MK activities between 1976 and 1978, including that she had trained with MK, plotted to commit arson, propagated the aims of the banned ANC, conducted reconnaissance with the intention to commit sabotage, possessed illegal weapons and explosives, and recruited for the ANC. She was convicted of three charges under the Terrorism Act and on 7 November 1980 was sentenced to a total of 16 years' imprisonment – two eight-year sentences run concurrently.

Modise served her full eight-year sentence (less one day) in Pretoria Central Prison, Kroonstad Women's Prison, and Klerksdorp Women's Prison. While in prison, she completed her matriculation certificate and, through the University of South Africa, a Bachelor's degree in industrial psychology and economics. She was released in November 1988.

== Early parliamentary career: 1994–2004 ==
In South Africa's first post-apartheid election in April 1994, Modise was elected to represent the ANC in the National Assembly, the lower house of the new South African Parliament. She held her seat until 2004 and from 1998 onwards, she served as chairperson of the Portfolio Committee on Defence and Joint Standing Committee on Defence. She was also a member of the Robben Island Museum Council from 1994 to 2010.

For much of her early parliamentary career, Modise served as an ordinary member of the ANC's National Executive Committee. She was first elected to the committee at the party's 49th National Conference in December 1994; by popularity she was ranked 50th of 60 candidates elected. At the next national conference in 1997 she was not re-elected to the committee but was co-opted onto it shortly after the elections. Finally, she was returned by election at the 51st National Conference in 2002, ranked 31st of 60.

=== North West "Talibans": 2002 ===
As a parliamentarian, Modise emerged as a key figure in the North West branch of the ANC, particularly as a member of a group which sought to challenge the leadership of longstanding ANC Provincial Chairperson and Premier Popo Molefe. While Molefe's opponents argued that Molefe had failed to act against corruption or resolve divisions in the provincial party, academic Andrew Manson suggested that Modise's supporters were motivated by nativism, believing that the political leadership of the North West "ought to be in the hands of people indigenous to the province, i.e. herself and her supporters". During this period, Modise and others, backed by Supra Mahumapelo and other provincial leaders of the ANC Youth League, introduced an unsuccessful motion of no confidence in Molefe's leadership of the party. The Mahumapelo-led pro-Modise faction was nicknamed "the Talibans", a moniker that was borrowed two decades later by Siboniso Duma's faction in the KwaZulu-Natal ANC.

Ahead of the 2002 North West ANC provincial elective conference, Modise mounted an unsuccessful challenge to Molefe's bid for re-election. Her campaign to become ANC Provincial Chairperson in the North West initially appeared highly successful: she was nominated for the position by four of five regional branches in the province, with only Bojanala region expressing support for Molefe, and she received strong support from the provincial Youth League, from the provincial Women's League, and from senior members of the ANC Provincial Executive Committee. She was also viewed as the favoured candidate of the incumbent national leadership of the party under ANC President Thabo Mbeki.

However, when the elective conference was held in June 2002 in Rustenberg, Modise lost, winning only 229 votes against Molefe's 355. In the aftermath, the Mail & Guardian reported that she was upset about the way the election had been conducted. Political commentator William Gumede described the conference as "ugly" and adduced, from the "derogatory slogans" shouted at Modise during the conference, that she had lost because she was "seen as Mbeki's candidate".

=== ANC Women's League presidential campaign: 2003 ===
Modise served as a member of the National Executive Committee of the ANC Women's League from 1991 until December 1993, when she was elected as deputy president of the league. She held that position for two terms until 2003. Towards the end of her second term, in April 2003, Winnie Madikizela-Mandela resigned as ANC Women's League president and Modise stepped in as acting president.

Modise subsequently launched a campaign to succeed Madikizela-Mandela permanently. In a heated contest, she was defeated in August 2003 by league secretary-general Nosiviwe Mapisa-Nqakula, who beat her by 528 votes.

== North West Provincial Legislature: 2004–2014 ==
=== Speaker of the North West: 2004–2010 ===
Pursuant to the 2004 general election, Modise left the national Parliament to become a member of the North West Provincial Legislature. She was Speaker of the provincial legislature from 2004 to 2009.

=== ANC Deputy Secretary-General: 2007–2010 ===
At the ANC's 52nd National Conference in December 2007, Modise was elected to a five-year term as Deputy Secretary-General of the ANC. She was nominated from the floor of the conference after Baleka Mbete, the frontrunner until then, withdrew her name to stand instead for the position of National Chairperson. Modise's candidacy was part of an informal slate aligned to Jacob Zuma, who won the ANC presidency at the same conference. She comfortably defeated Thoko Didiza for the position, winning 2,304 votes to Didiza's 1,455.

She served only one term as Deputy Secretary-General. She was nominated for reelection at the end of her term but declined, choosing instead to challenge Mbete, who was running – with Zuma's endorsement – for reelection as National Chairperson. When the election was held at the 53rd National Conference in December 2012, Modise lost, receiving only 939 votes against Mbete's 3,010. She also failed to gain election to an ordinary seat on the National Executive Committee.

=== Premier of the North West: 2010–2014 ===
In the 2009 general election, Modise was re-elected to the North West Provincial Legislature, and the Mail & Guardian reported that the North West branch of the ANC supported a proposal to elect her as Premier of the North West. Maureen Modiselle was selected instead – but only until 19 November 2010, when Modise succeeded her as Premier.

Modise was Premier during the Marikana massacre in the North West in 2012. During her tenure, she had an increasingly difficult relationship (which she described in 2011 as "a bit of a headache") with Supra Mahumapelo, then the ANC Provincial Chairperson in the North West and the Speaker of the North West Provincial Legislature. She remained in office as Premier until the next general election in 2014, when she was succeeded by Mahumapelo.

== Return to national politics: 2014–2024 ==
=== NCOP Chairperson: 2014–2019 ===
Pursuant to the 2014 election, Modise was elected unopposed as Chairperson of the National Council of Provinces (NCOP), the upper house of the national Parliament. She held the position throughout the second term of President Jacob Zuma. She later said, during a 2021 hearing of the Zondo Commission, that it was "a pity" that she and other parliamentary leaders did not "wake up" to allegations of state capture during Zuma's presidency and therefore did not use Parliament's investigatory powers to their fullest.

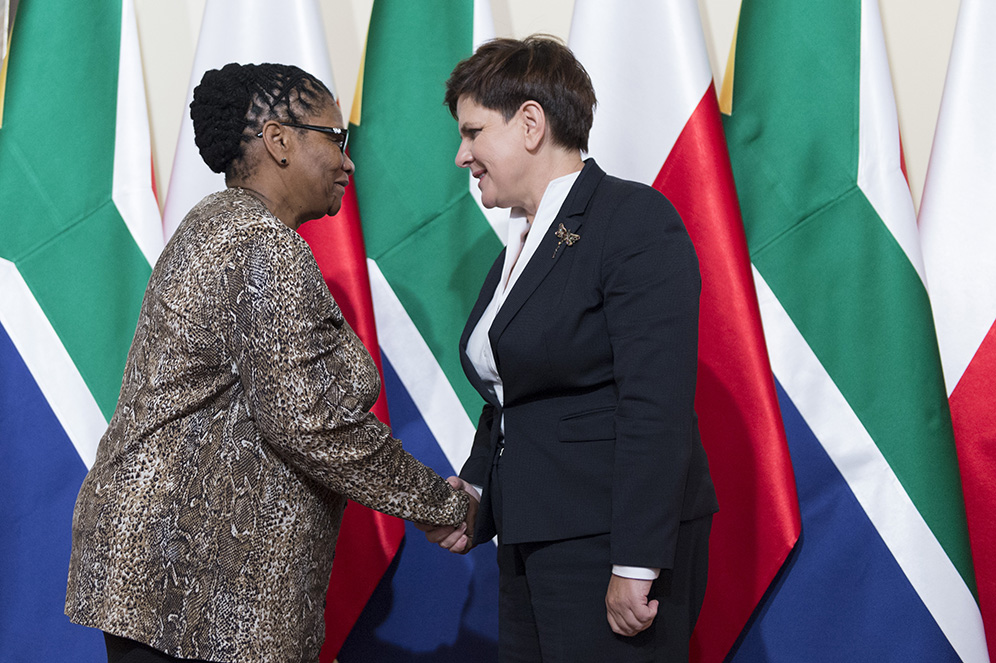
Modise with Polish Prime Minister Beata Szydło in Warsaw, September 2016

In 2017, NCOP administrators reportedly advised Modise that she had claimed an excessively large parliamentary travel allowance, calculated using an incorrect formula. She was asked to repay the R125,953 which she had received in excess since 2014. The Sunday Times reported that she was "resisting" this request and disputed the claim that she had been overpaid.

During this period, Modise regained her seat on the National Executive Committee, winning another five-year term at the 54th National Conference in December 2017. When Mahumapelo resigned as Premier in 2018, it was rumoured that Modise would return to the North West to replace him. Addressing the rumours, Modise said lightheartedly, "If the ANC asks you to do something, you go, but I wish they don’t send me back there"; she ultimately served the full parliamentary term as NCOP Chairperson.

=== NA Speaker: 2019–2021 ===
Following her term as NCOP Chairperson, Modise was elected to the counterpart position in the National Assembly, becoming the Speaker of the National Assembly after the 2019 general election. In 2021, the Daily Maverick complimented Modise's performance, which it said had helped restore dignity to the assembly's proceedings after years of "destabilising" controversy during Zuma's administration. This assessment received wide assent among parliamentary leaders of the country's opposition parties: the United Democratic Movement's Bantu Holomisa described Modise as "a no-nonsense-taker", while Narend Singh of Inkatha Freedom Party said she had "run a tight ship" and the Democratic Alliance's Natasha Mazzone described her as the legislature's "UN peacekeeping force" and as truly non-partisan. The Business Day agreed that she "exercised a firm grip" over the assembly's sittings.

=== Defence Minister: 2021–2024 ===
On 5 August 2021, President Cyril Ramaphosa appointed Modise to his cabinet as Minister of Defence and Military Veterans. Her appointment was part of a cabinet reshuffle which saw her swap positions with former Defence Minister Nosiviwe Mapisa-Nqakula and which was partly intended to reinvigorate the so-called security cluster of ministries following an episode of serious civil unrest. She served in the office until the 2024 general election, when she lost her seat in the National Assembly as a result of the ANC's decline in electoral support.

==== Hostage crisis ====
On the evening of 14 October 2021, Modise was at a hotel in Pretoria when she was held hostage by a group of military veterans calling themselves the Liberation Struggle War Veterans. She was detained with 25 others, including her deputy, Thabang Makwetla, and the Minister in the Presidency, Mondli Gungubele. The veterans demanded a meeting with President Ramaphosa and reparations for their role in the anti-apartheid struggle. After almost three hours, members of the Special Task Force entered the hotel, freeing the hostages and making dozens of arrests. The National Prosecuting Authority charged 53 people with kidnapping and suggested that it might add terrorism-related charges, but in May 2022 the case was withdrawn.

==== ANC National Executive Committee ====
On 16 March 2022, the National Working Committee of the ANC appointed Modise to lead a task team to assess the status of the ANC Women's League, which at the time was in disarray. Controversially, Modise recommended that the mainstream party should disband the incumbent leadership of the league, at that time headed by Bathabile Dlamini.

Ahead of the ANC's 55th National Conference in December 2022, there were rumours that Modise was a possible candidate to become ANC Deputy President. The ANC Women's League supported this proposal, but she did not appear on the ballot paper. Instead, the 55th National Conference re-elected her as an ordinary member of the ANC National Executive Committee; she was ranked 32nd of the 80 members elected.

== Animal cruelty charges ==
In July 2014, the NSPCA discovered a number of dead animals, including chickens, pigs, goats and geese, on a farm owned by Modise in Modderfontein outside Potchefstroom. The animals had starved to death and some of the surviving pigs were eating the carcasses of other animals. Modise said that the animals had been abandoned by a caretaker she had hired to monitor the farm while she was attending to her NCOP responsibilities in Cape Town, and she said she was "saddened" by the incident. She also said, "I am not a farmer. I am trying to farm. I am learning. But if you are a woman and you are learning you are not allowed to make mistakes". The Freedom Front Plus said that Modise was a poor example for emerging black farmers.

On behalf of the NSPCA, AfriForum instituted private prosecution against Modise on animal cruelty charges. However, in April 2021, a Potchefstroom court found Modise not guilty, ruling that Modise had not been negligent and that the hired caretaker should be held responsible for the incident.

== Personal life ==
Modise has four children. She gave birth to a daughter named Boingotlo in January 1975 when she was still in high school. A second daughter, Mandisa, was born on 15 February 1980 at Johannesburg Hospital while Modise was being detained by the apartheid police. While Modise was occupied with her MK work, Boingotlo and Mandisa were raised by her mother.
