= Mpofu =

- Location within Eastern Cape Location within South Africa
- Coordinates: 32.340°S 26.792°E
- Country: South Africa
- Province: Eastern Cape
- District: Chris Hani
- Municipality: Enoch Mgijima

Area
  - Total: 1.73 km^{2} (0.67 sq mi)

Population (2001)
  - Total: 171
  - Density: 98.8/km^{2} (256/sq mi)
- Time zone: UTC+2 (SAST)

Mpofu is a town in Chris Hani District Municipality in the Eastern Cape province of South Africa.

As of 1996, it was the seat of a magisterial district.
