= Atamelang =

- Location within North West (South African province) Location within South Africa
- Coordinates: 26°30′15″S 25°22′10″E
- Country: South Africa
- Province: North West
- District: Ngaka Modiri Molema
- Municipality: Tswaing
- Established: 1978

Area
  - Total: 3.58 km^{2} (1.38 sq mi)

Population (2011)
  - Total: 6,082
  - Density: 1,700/km^{2} (4,400/sq mi)

Racial makeup (2011)
  - Black African: 98.9%
  - Khoisans: 1.4%
  - Indian/Asian: 1.2%

First languages (2011)
  - Tswana: 81.0%
  - Sotho: 10.0%
  - Afrikaans: 4.1%
  - Other: 5.9%
- Time zone: UTC+2 (SAST)
- Postal code (street): 2732
- PO box: 2732
- Area code: 018

Atamelang is a township in Tswaing Municipality (a business hub) with Regional Court, Police Station, Home Affairs, Department of Education, 24 hours Clinic, Department of Justice, Stadium, Shopping Complex, Old Age Home, NWB bus depot, Department of Public Works, Community Hall, 2 Primary Schools (Manamolela, JS Masisi) & 1 High School (Phatsima High), 1 Special School (Lillian Legetla), Library, Built It Hardware , Garage Station, Radio Station (Modiri FM), Telkom branch, Resource Center, it has sections like Manonyane, New-Stance, RDP/Trench-Town, Reatametse, Spook-Town, Selection-Park, Stella, Tshiping and West. It is under Tswaing Local Municipality in the North West province of South Africa. The township was part of the former country of Bophutatswana, some 22 km north-west of Delareyville.

Atamelang was established set up by the then apartheid government in 1978.

== Demographics ==
Its population in 2011 was 5,906. Of the total Black African made up 98.9%, Coloured (mixed race) 1.4% and Indian/Asian 1.2%.
