= List of speakers of the North West Provincial Legislature =

Speaker of the North West Provincial Legislature
- Incumbent; Sussana Dantjie since May 21, 2014
- North West Provincial Legislature
- Style: Honorable Speaker
- Type: Presiding officer of a unicameral legislature
- Appointer: Elected by members of the North West Provincial Legislature
- Formation: 1994
- First holder: Jerry Thibedi

This is a list of speakers of the North West Provincial Legislature in South Africa.

Name	Entered office	Left office	Party
Jerry Thibedi	1994	1999	ANC
Johannes Selapedi	1999	2004	ANC
Thandi Modise	2004	2009	ANC
Nono Maloyi	2009	2012	ANC
Supra Mahumapelo	2012	2014	ANC
Sussana Dantjie	2014	Incumbent	ANC
