= Tswaing Local Municipality =

Coordinates: 26°41′S 25°28′E

Tswaing
- Local municipality
- Location in the North West
- Country: South Africa
- Province: North West
- District: Ngaka Modiri Molema
- Seat: Delareyville
- Wards: 14

Government
  - Type: Municipal council
  - Mayor: Norah Mahlanghu

Area
  - Total: 5,966 km^{2} (2,303 sq mi)

Population (2011)
  - Total: 124,218
  - Density: 20.82/km^{2} (53.93/sq mi)

Racial makeup (2011)
  - Black African: 92.4%
  - Coloured: 1.4%
  - Indian/Asian: 0.3%
  - White: 5.6%

First languages (2011)
  - Tswana: 83.5%
  - Afrikaans: 6.8%
  - Sotho: 2.5%
  - Xhosa: 2.2%
  - Other: 5%
- Time zone: UTC+2 (SAST)
- Municipal code: NW382

Tswaing Municipality (Tswana: Mmasepala wa Tswaing) is a local municipality within the Ngaka Modiri Molema District Municipality, in the North West province of South Africa. It consists of the towns of Delareyville, Sannieshof and Ottosdal.

== Main places ==
The 2011 census divided the municipality into the following main places:

Place	Code	Area (km^{2})	Population	Most spoken language
Atamelang	666020	2.00	5.189	Tswana
Deelpan	666001	5.37	4,822	Tswana
Delareyville	666024	36.53	10,630	Tswana
Diretsane	666010	2.21	1,434	Tswana
Doomlagte	666006	1.96	572	Tswana
Ganalaagte	666014	2.92	2,830	Tswana
Geluk	666012	0.60	353	Tswana
Geysdorp	666022	3.58	1,365	Tswana
Khunwana	666004	17.92	7,651	Tswana
Kopela	666009	5.25	5,187	Tswana
Letsopa	666025	2.58	17,488	Tswana
Majaneng	666017	1.01	709	Tswana
Majeng	666013	2.43	1,501	Tswana
Manamolele	666021	2.96	7,695	Tswana
Mandela Park	666016	0.32	829	Tswana
Manonyane	666019	0.85	573	Tswana
Mofufutso	666008	4.52	2,467	Tswana
Mokope	666018	1.16	717	Tswana
Ottosdal	666026	5.15	884	Afrikaans
Rakgwedi	666015	1.55	3,021	Tswana
Saleng	666011	2.53	1,262	Tswana
Sannieshof	666023	5.42	11,016	Tswana
Thaba Sione	666003	3.00	1,195	Tswana
Thawane	666005	0.66	316	Tswana
Witpan	666007	2.38	1,148	Tswana
Remainder of the municipality	666002	5,851.41	36,379	Tswana

== Politics ==
The municipal council consists of twenty-eight members elected by mixed-member proportional representation. Fourteen councillors are elected by first-past-the-post voting in fourteen wards, while the remaining fourteen are chosen from party lists so that the total number of party representatives is proportional to the number of votes received.

In the election of 4 November 2026 the African National Congress (ANC) won a majority of sixteen seats on the council.

The following table shows the results of the election.

Party	Ward			List			Total seats
Party	Votes	%	Seats	Votes	%	Seats	Total seats
African National Congress	13,952	56.64	14	13,932	56.44	2	16
Democratic Alliance	3,575	14.51	0	3,662	14.84	4	4
Economic Freedom Fighters	2,092	8.49	0	2,249	9.11	3	3
ActionSA	1,295	5.26	0	1,253	5.08	2	2
South African Communist Party	1,318	5.35	0	1,200	4.86	1	1
uMkhonto weSizwe Party	960	3.90	0	907	3.67	1	1
Freedom Front Plus	729	2.96	0	706	2.86	1	1
6 other parties	712	2.89	0	774	3.14	0	0
Total	24,633	100.00	14	24,683	100.00	14	28
Valid votes	24,633	97.72		24,683	97.69		
Invalid/blank votes	574	2.28		583	2.31		
Total votes	25,207	100.00		25,266	100.00		
Registered voters/turnout	55,690	45.26		55,690	45.37		

== Financial mismanagement ==
In January 2025, the municipality was listed as one of the top ten municipalities in arrears on their pension contributions.
