= Tshitale =

- Location within Limpopo Location within South Africa
- Coordinates: 23.352°S 29.993°E
- Country: South Africa
- Province: Limpopo
- District: Vhembe
- Municipality: Makhado

Area
  - Total: 1.70 km^{2} (0.66 sq mi)

Population (2011)
  - Total: 1,111
  - Density: 654/km^{2} (1,690/sq mi)

Racial makeup (2011)
  - Black African: 98.9%
  - Indian/Asian: 0.7%
  - Other: 0.4%

First languages (2011)
  - Venda: 65.9%
  - Sotho: 15.4%
  - Northern Sotho: 10.0%
  - Tsonga: 5.7%
  - Other: 3.0%
- Time zone: UTC+2 (SAST)

Tshitale is a town in Vhembe District Municipality in the Limpopo province of South Africa.
