= Moses Kotane Local Municipality elections =

Local elections in the North West Province, South Africa

The Moses Kotane Local Municipality is a Local Municipality in the North West Province in South Africa. The council consists of sixty-nine members elected by mixed-member proportional representation. Thirty-five councillors are elected by first-past-the-post voting in thirty-five wards, while the remaining thirty-four are chosen from party lists so that the total number of party representatives is proportional to the number of votes received.

In the election of 4 November 2026 the African National Congress (ANC) won a majority of thirty-five seats.

== Results ==
The following table shows the composition of the council after past elections.

Event	ACDP	AIC	ANC	COPE	DA	EFF	UCDP	Other	Total
2000 election	—	—	46	—	—	—	11	3	60
2006 election	1	—	49	—	1	—	6	3	60
2011 election	1	—	49	4	3	—	3	2	62
2016 election	0	1	45	1	4	15	1	1	68
2021 election	1	1	46	—	2	13	1	5	69
2026 election	1	—	35	—	4	11	1	17	69

== December 2000 election ==
The following table shows the results of the 2000 election.

Party	Ward			List			Total seats
Party	Votes	%	Seats	Votes	%	Seats	Total seats
African National Congress	30,748	75.40	29	31,960	77.75	17	46
United Christian Democratic Party	7,661	18.79	0	7,962	19.37	11	11
United Democratic Movement	1,105	2.71	0	1,184	2.88	2	2
Independent candidates	1,268	3.11	1				1
Total	40,782	100.00	30	41,106	100.00	30	60
Valid votes	40,782	96.14		41,106	96.93		
Invalid/blank votes	1,638	3.86		1,300	3.07		
Total votes	42,420	100.00		42,406	100.00		
Registered voters/turnout	104,112	40.74		104,112	40.73		

== March 2006 election ==
The following table shows the results of the 2006 election.

Party	Ward			List			Total seats
Party	Votes	%	Seats	Votes	%	Seats	Total seats
African National Congress	42,077	76.81	28	44,805	82.05	21	49
United Christian Democratic Party	5,118	9.34	0	5,574	10.21	6	6
Independent candidates	5,607	10.24	2				2
Independent Democrats	410	0.75	0	1,860	3.41	1	1
African Christian Democratic Party	905	1.65	0	1,095	2.01	1	1
Democratic Alliance	464	0.85	0	873	1.60	1	1
People's Progressive Party	197	0.36	0	402	0.74	0	0
Total	54,778	100.00	30	54,609	100.00	30	60
Valid votes	54,778	97.76		54,609	96.52		
Invalid/blank votes	1,255	2.24		1,968	3.48		
Total votes	56,033	100.00		56,577	100.00		
Registered voters/turnout	118,626	47.24		118,626	47.69		

== May 2011 election ==
The following table shows the results of the 2011 election.

Party	Ward			List			Total seats
Party	Votes	%	Seats	Votes	%	Seats	Total seats
African National Congress	44,381	74.49	29	47,187	81.02	20	49
Congress of the People	3,162	5.31	0	3,653	6.27	4	4
United Christian Democratic Party	3,354	5.63	0	3,027	5.20	3	3
Democratic Alliance	2,574	4.32	0	2,862	4.91	3	3
Independent candidates	5,088	8.54	2				2
African Christian Democratic Party	928	1.56	0	733	1.26	1	1
African People's Convention	96	0.16	0	779	1.34	0	0
Total	59,583	100.00	31	58,241	100.00	31	62
Valid votes	59,583	97.23		58,241	96.58		
Invalid/blank votes	1,696	2.77		2,062	3.42		
Total votes	61,279	100.00		60,303	100.00		
Registered voters/turnout	120,689	50.77		120,689	49.97		

== August 2016 election ==
The following table shows the results of the 2016 election.

Party	Ward			List			Total seats
Party	Votes	%	Seats	Votes	%	Seats	Total seats
African National Congress	42,649	66.92	34	40,700	64.53	11	45
Economic Freedom Fighters	12,945	20.31	0	13,670	21.67	15	15
Democratic Alliance	3,324	5.22	0	3,189	5.06	4	4
African Independent Congress				2,643	4.19	1	1
Independent candidates	2,236	3.51	0				0
Congress of the People	1,097	1.72	0	1,068	1.69	1	1
United Christian Democratic Party	798	1.25	0	921	1.46	1	1
African People's Convention	525	0.82	0	501	0.79	1	1
Freedom Front Plus	159	0.25	0	140	0.22	0	0
African Christian Democratic Party				244	0.39	0	0
Total	63,733	100.00	34	63,076	100.00	34	68
Valid votes	63,733	97.38		63,076	96.97		
Invalid/blank votes	1,715	2.62		1,971	3.03		
Total votes	65,448	100.00		65,047	100.00		
Registered voters/turnout	126,321	51.81		126,321	51.49		

== November 2021 election ==
The following table shows the results of the 2021 election.

Party	Ward			List			Total seats
Party	Votes	%	Seats	Votes	%	Seats	Total seats
African National Congress	30,633	62.59	35	31,327	66.18	11	46
Economic Freedom Fighters	8,719	17.81	0	9,024	19.06	13	13
Independent candidates	3,109	6.35	0				0
Tsogang Civic Movement	907	1.85	0	1,066	2.25	2	2
Democratic Alliance	999	2.04	0	921	1.95	2	2
Forum for Service Delivery	888	1.81	0	768	1.62	1	1
Independents for Communities	648	1.32	0	990	2.09	1	1
African Independent Congress	745	1.52	0	861	1.82	1	1
Bana Ba Thari	560	1.14	0	578	1.22	1	1
United Christian Democratic Party	495	1.01	0	575	1.21	1	1
African Christian Democratic Party	316	0.65	0	323	0.68	1	1
African People's Convention	345	0.70	0	183	0.39	0	0
United Democratic Movement	186	0.38	0	171	0.36	0	0
Africa Restoration Alliance	198	0.40	0	136	0.29	0	0
Congress of the People	99	0.20	0	175	0.37	0	0
African Transformation Movement	73	0.15	0	142	0.30	0	0
Abantu Batho Congress	22	0.04	0	93	0.20	0	0
Total	48,942	100.00	35	47,333	100.00	34	69
Valid votes	48,942	97.93		47,333	97.83		
Invalid/blank votes	1,033	2.07		1,051	2.17		
Total votes	49,975	100.00		48,384	100.00		
Registered voters/turnout	122,553	40.78		122,553	39.48		

=== By-elections from November 2021 ===
The following by-elections were held to fill vacant ward seats in the period since November 2021.

Date	Ward	Party of the previous councillor	Party of the newly elected councillor
24 April 2024	18	African National Congress	African National Congress

== November 2026 election ==
The following table shows the results of the 2026 election.

Party	Ward			List			Total seats
Party	Votes	%	Seats	Votes	%	Seats	Total seats
African National Congress	28,822	49.74	33	29,574	51.49	2	35
Economic Freedom Fighters	8,891	15.34	1	9,370	16.32	10	11
Democratic Alliance	3,387	5.84	0	3,675	6.40	4	4
South African Communist Party	3,544	6.12	0	3,188	5.55	4	4
ActionSA	1,963	3.39	0	2,300	4.00	3	3
uMkhonto weSizwe Party	1,644	2.84	0	1,606	2.80	2	2
Independent candidates	2,598	4.48	1				1
Seriti Le Kaelo Independent Party	1,000	1.73	0	929	1.62	1	1
Purple Party Ikageng	937	1.62	0	938	1.63	1	1
African Christian Democratic Party	581	1.00	0	682	1.19	1	1
Labour Party	591	1.02	0	670	1.17	1	1
United Christian Democratic Party	558	0.96	0	554	0.96	1	1
African People's Convention	486	0.84	0	580	1.01	1	1
Bophuthatswana Civil Movement	363	0.63	0	563	0.98	1	1
Tsogang Civic Movement	356	0.61	0	388	0.68	1	1
African Transformation Movement	331	0.57	0	406	0.71	1	1
Rustenburg People's Party	530	0.91	0				0
All Citizens Party	196	0.34	0	287	0.50	0	0
African Revolutionary Council	118	0.20	0	329	0.57	0	0
Azanian People's Organisation	218	0.38	0	213	0.37	0	0
United Africans Transformation	127	0.22	0	274	0.48	0	0
Patriotic Alliance	161	0.28	0	212	0.37	0	0
African Economic Freedom	150	0.26	0	195	0.34	0	0
Afrika Mayibuye Movement	97	0.17	0	146	0.25	0	0
African Spear Movement	110	0.19	0	120	0.21	0	0
Economic Emancipation Forum	85	0.15	0	62	0.11	0	0
Arona	34	0.06	0	106	0.18	0	0
South African Political Association	29	0.05	0	64	0.11	0	0
Congress of the People	44	0.08	0				0
Total	57,951	100.00	35	57,431	100.00	34	69
Valid votes	57,951	97.60		57,431	96.97		
Invalid/blank votes	1,425	2.40		1,794	3.03		
Total votes	59,376	100.00		59,225	100.00		
Registered voters/turnout	137,803	43.09		137,803	42.98		
