= Ncotshane =

- Location within KwaZulu-Natal Location within South Africa
- Coordinates: 27.342°S 31.580°E
- Country: South Africa
- Province: KwaZulu-Natal
- District: Zululand
- Municipality: uPhongolo

Area
  - Total: 2.93 km^{2} (1.13 sq mi)

Population (2011)
  - Total: 13,071
  - Density: 4,460/km^{2} (11,600/sq mi)

Racial makeup (2011)
  - Black African: 99.7%
  - Coloured: 0.1%

First languages (2011)
  - Zulu: 93.4%
  - S. Ndebele: 1.7%
  - Other: 5.0%
- Time zone: UTC+2 (SAST)
- Postal code (street): 3170
- PO box: 3151

Ncotshane is a township in the town of PongolaZululand District Municipality in the KwaZulu-Natal province of South Africa.
