= Premier of North West =

Head of government of North West

- Incumbent; Lazzy Mokgosi since 14 June 2024
- Style: The Honourable
- Appointer: North West Provincial Legislature
- Term length: Five years, renewable once
- Inaugural holder: Popo Molefe
- Formation: 7 May 1994
- Website: www.nwpg.gov.za

The premier of North West is the head of government of the North West province of South Africa. The current premier of the North West is Lazzy Mokgosi, a member of the African National Congress, who was elected premier in June 2024, following the 2024 general election.

== Functions ==
In terms specified by the constitution, the executive authority of a province is vested in the premier. The premier appoints an Executive Council made up of ten members of the provincial legislature; they are called members of the Executive Council (MECs). The MECs are practically ministers and the Executive Council a cabinet at the provincial level. The premier has the ability to appoint and dismiss MECs at his/her own discretion.

The premier and the Executive Council are responsible for implementing provincial legislation, along with any national legislation assigned to the province. They set provincial policy and regulate the departments of the provincial government; their actions are subject to the national constitution.

In order for an act of the provincial legislature to become law, the premier must sign it. If he/she believes that the act is unconstitutional, it can be referred back to the legislature for reconsideration. If the premier and the legislature cannot agree, the act must be referred to the Constitutional Court for final consideration.

The premier is also ex officio a member of the National Council of Provinces, the upper house of Parliament, as one of the special delegates from the province.

== List of premiers of North West ==
No.	Portrait	Name (Birth–Death)	Term of office			Political party
No.	Portrait	Name (Birth–Death)	Took office	Left office	Time in office	Political party
1		Popo Molefe (born 1952)	7 May 1994	30 April 2004	9 years, 359 days	African National Congress
2		Edna Molewa (1957–2018)	30 April 2004	6 May 2009	5 years, 6 days	African National Congress
3		Maureen Modiselle (born 1941)	6 May 2009	19 November 2010	1 year, 197 days	African National Congress
4		Thandi Modise (born 1959)	19 November 2010	20 May 2014	3 years, 182 days	African National Congress
5		Supra Mahumapelo (born 1968)	20 May 2014	23 May 2018	4 years, 3 days	African National Congress
-		Wendy Nelson (acting) (born 1962)	9 May 2018	22 June 2018	44 days	African National Congress
6		Job Mokgoro (born 1948)	22 June 2018	26 August 2021	3 years, 65 days	African National Congress
-		Motlalepula Rosho (acting) (born 1970)	26 August 2021	7 September 2021	12 days	African National Congress
7		Bushy Maape (1957–2026)	7 September 2021	14 June 2024	2 years, 281 days	African National Congress
8		Lazarus Mokgosi (born 1970)	14 June 2024	Incumbent	2 years, 85 days	African National Congress

== Election ==
The election for the North West Provincial Legislature is held every five years, simultaneously with the election of the National Assembly; the last such election occurred on 29 May 2024. At the first meeting of the provincial legislature after an election, the members choose the premier from amongst themselves. The provincial legislature can force the premier to resign by a motion of no confidence. If the premiership becomes vacant (for whatever reason) the provincial legislature must choose a new premier to serve out the period until the next election. One person cannot have served more than two five-year terms as premier; however, when a premier is chosen to fill a vacancy the time until the next election does not count as a term.

== See also ==
- Politics of North West (South African province)
- Premier (South Africa)
- President of South Africa
- Politics of South Africa
