= Kieka Mynhardt =

South African and Canadian mathematician

Christina Magdalena Mynhardt
- Born: 1953 (age 72–73); Cape Town, South Afriaca
- Other name: Kieka Mynhardt
- Education: Rand Afrikaans University(PhD) (now University of Johannesburg)
- Known for: Domination theory in graphs Domination versions of the eight queens puzzle
- Awards: Founding member, Academy of Science of South Africa (1995); Alumni Dignitas Award, University of Johannesburg (2005)
- Scientific career
- Fields: Mathematics; Graph Theory
- Workplaces: University of Victoria; University of South Africa (former); University of Pretoria (former)
- Thesis: The G-constructability of graphs (1979)
- Doctoral advisor: Izak Broere

Christina Magdalena (Kieka) Mynhardt (née Steyn; born 1953) is a South African born Canadian mathematician known for her work on dominating sets in graph theory, including domination versions of the eight queens puzzle. She is a professor of mathematics and statistics at the University of Victoria in Canada.

== Education and career ==
Mynhardt was born in Cape Town, and was a student at the Hoërskool Lichtenburg. She completed her Ph.D. at Rand Afrikaans University (now incorporated into the University of Johannesburg) in 1979, supervised by Izak Broere. Her dissertation, The $\mathcal{G}$-constructability of graphs, gave a conjectured construction for the planar graphs by repeatedly adding vertices with prescribed neighborhoods. She became a faculty member at the University of Pretoria and then the University of South Africa before moving to the University of Victoria.

== Recognition ==
In 1995, Mynhardt was selected as one of the founding members of the Academy of Science of South Africa. She was a 2005 recipient of the Dignitas Award of the University of Johannesburg Alumni.
