= Mahikeng Local Municipality =

Mahikeng
- Local municipality
- Seal

- Location in the North West
- Coordinates: 25°55′S 25°40′E
- Country: South Africa
- Province: North West
- District: Ngaka Modiri Molema
- Seat: Mafikeng
- Wards: 35

Government
  - Type: Municipal council
  - Mayor: Tshepiso Mphehlo

Area
  - Total: 3,698 km^{2} (1,428 sq mi)

Population (2011)
  - Total: 291,527
  - Density: 78.83/km^{2} (204.2/sq mi)

Racial makeup (2011)
  - Black African: 95.5%
  - Coloured: 2.3%
  - Indian/Asian: 0.8%
  - White: 1.3%

First languages (2011)
  - Tswana: 78.4%
  - English: 4.6%
  - Xhosa: 3.9%
  - Sotho: 3.5%
  - Other: 9.6%
- Time zone: UTC+2 (SAST)
- Municipal code: NW383

Mahikeng Municipality (Tswana: Mmasepala wa Mahikeng) is a local municipality within the Ngaka Modiri Molema District Municipality, in the North West province of South Africa. Mahikeng is a Setswana word meaning "place of rocks".

== Main places ==
The 2001 census divided the municipality into the following main places:

Place	Code	Area (km^{2})	Population	Most spoken language
Bafokeng Ba Ga Moraka	60801	0.59	792	Tswana
Bakwena Ba Ga Molopyane	60802	3.19	4,342	Tswana
Banogeng	60803	14.15	0	-
Barolong Boo Rapulana	60804	27.12	5,734	Tswana
Barolong Boo Ratshidi Part 1	60805	390.94	45,751	Tswana
Barolong Boo Ratshidi Part 2	60809	458.71	72,665	Tswana
Barolong Boo Ratshidi Part 3	60806	22.73	1,154	Tswana
Barolong Boo Ratshidi Part 3	60810	24.04	1,013	Tswana
Barolong Boo Ratshidi Part 4	60807	39.41	1,463	Tswana
Barolong Boo Ratshidi Part 5	60811	141.89	36,599	Tswana
Barolong Boo Ratshidi Part 6	60808	31.75	2,666	Tswana
Batloung Ba Ga Shole	60812	5.43	8,434	Tswana
Floorspar Mine	60813	1.90	148	Tswana
Kopano	60814	161.49	17,041	Tswana
Madikwe Part 1	60815	102.28	151	Tswana
Madikwe Part 2	60822	0.83	347	Tswana
Mafikeng Part 1	60816	15.44	14,923	Tswana
Mafikeng Part 3	60824	105.41	296	Tswana
Mmabatho Part 1	60817	15.02	27,680	Tswana
Mmabatho Part 2	60825	344.56	63	Tswana
Montshioa	60818	2.68	8,939	Tswana
Rooigrond	60819	2.55	286	Tswana
Slurry	60820	2.95	540	Tswana
Wintershoek	60821	1.36	42	Afrikaans/Tswana
Remainder of the municipality (Mafikeng Part 2)	60823	1,777.21	8,433	Tswana

== Politics ==
The municipal council consists of seventy members elected by mixed-member proportional representation. Thirty-five councillors are elected by first-past-the-post voting in thirty-five wards, while the remaining thirty-five are chosen from party lists so that the total number of party representatives is proportional to the number of votes received.

In the election of 4 November 2026, no party won a majority. The African National Congress (ANC) won the largest number of seats on the council.

The following table shows the results of the election.

Party	Ward			List			Total seats
Party	Votes	%	Seats	Votes	%	Seats	Total seats
African National Congress	30,073	44.42	34	30,061	44.13	0	34
Economic Freedom Fighters	9,490	14.02	1	9,596	14.09	8	9
Democratic Alliance	7,277	10.75	0	7,866	11.55	7	7
ActionSA	5,566	8.22	0	6,105	8.96	6	6
uMkhonto weSizwe Party	3,423	5.06	0	3,135	4.60	3	3
South African Communist Party	1,579	2.33	0	1,483	2.18	2	2
United Christian Democratic Party	1,422	2.10	0	1,460	2.14	1	1
Patriotic Alliance	1,351	2.00	0	1,502	2.20	1	1
Afrika Mayibuye Movement	1,377	2.03	0	1,271	1.87	1	1
African Spear Movement	873	1.29	0	823	1.21	1	1
Independent candidates	1,523	2.25	0				0
Bophuthatswana Civil Movement	454	0.67	0	1,038	1.52	1	1
Freedom Front Plus	589	0.87	0	663	0.97	1	1
All and Citizens	689	1.02	0	512	0.75	1	1
African Independent Congress	504	0.74	0	654	0.96	1	1
African Christian Democratic Party	446	0.66	0	497	0.73	1	1
8 other parties	1,065	1.57	0	1,454	2.13	0	0
Total	67,701	100.00	35	68,120	100.00	35	70
Valid votes	67,701	98.09		68,120	98.13		
Invalid/blank votes	1,318	1.91		1,299	1.87		
Total votes	69,019	100.00		69,419	100.00		
Registered voters/turnout	150,161	45.96		150,161	46.23		
