= Coligny, South Africa =

Coligny
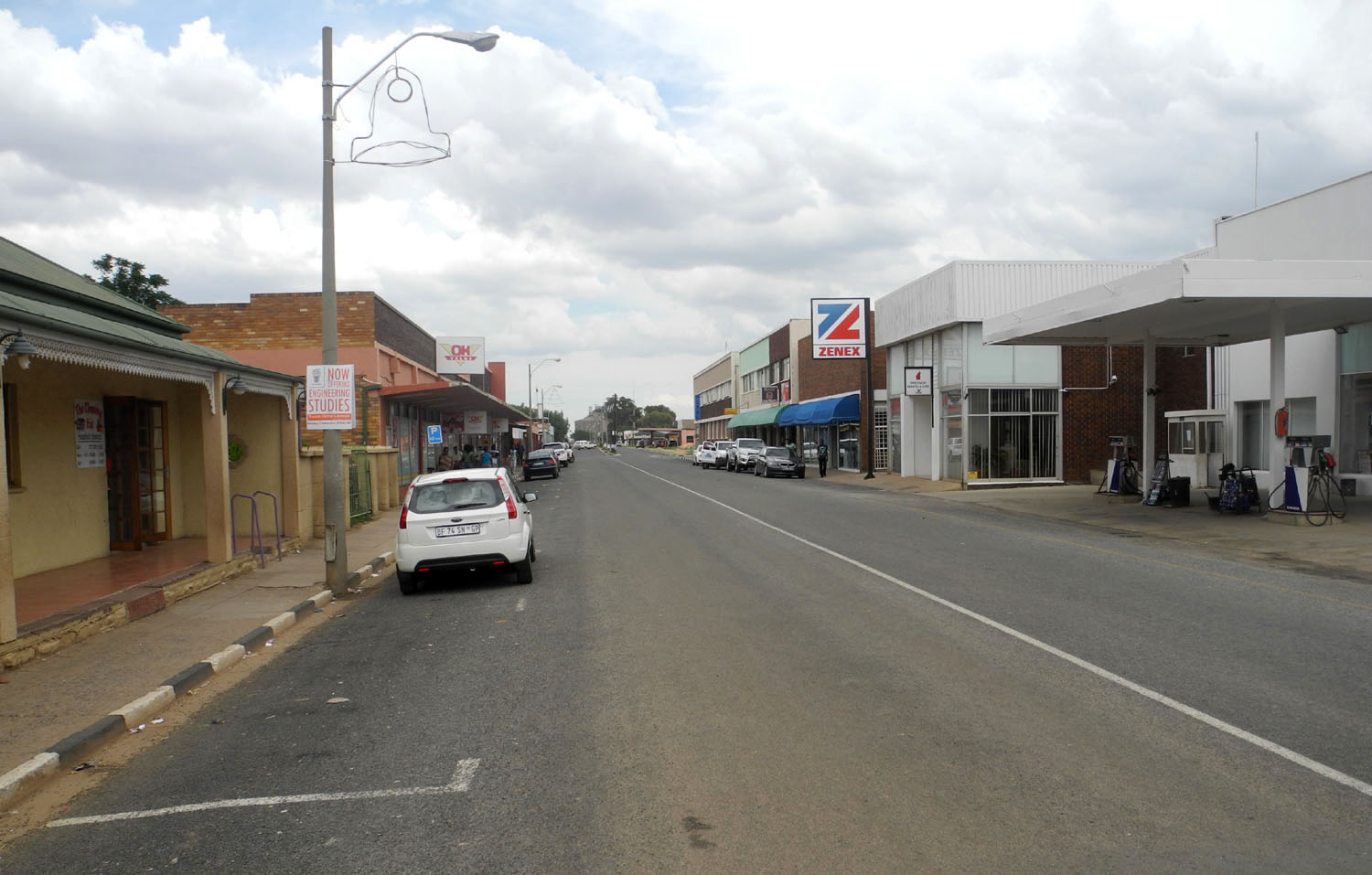
- Street in Coligny

- Location within North West (South African province) Location within South Africa
- Coordinates: 26°20′S 26°19′E
- Country: South Africa
- Province: North West
- District: Ngaka Modiri Molema
- Municipality: Ditsobotla

Area
  - Total: 4.36 km^{2} (1.68 sq mi)

Population (2011)
  - Total: 2,271
  - Density: 521/km^{2} (1,350/sq mi)

Racial makeup (2011)
  - Black African: 43.2%
  - Coloured: 3.4%
  - Indian/Asian: 1.9%
  - White: 49.8%
  - Other: 1.7%

First languages (2011)
  - Afrikaans: 50.6%
  - Tswana: 34.6%
  - English: 6.6%
  - Xhosa: 1.4%
  - Other: 6.8%
- Time zone: UTC+2 (SAST)
- Postal code (street): 2725
- PO box: 2725
- Area code: 018

Coligny is a town in North West Province, South Africa, located adjacent to the railway line between Lichtenburg and Johannesburg. It is approximately 27 kilometers (17 miles) southeast of Lichtenburg and is known for its maize farming.

== History ==
Originally named Treurfontein (Afrikaans: spring of sadness), the town was renamed Coligny on 23 July 1923. The new name honored Gaspard de Coligny, a Huguenot leader who died in the Massacre of St Bartholomew in 1572. Coligny has also been a site of sporadic diamond mining activities.

=== Gerdau ===
The Concordia Congregation, also known as the Gerdau Congregation after the origin of its first missionary, was established in 1905 on the farm Hakbosvlaakte, predating the town of Coligny. The church operated the Gerdauer Gemeinde-Schule, a German-language school, for 53 years. Supported by the German government, the school provided education from preschool through grade 7. In 1965, the school had two teachers and thirty students.

== 2017 rioting and the Coligny sunflower case ==
On 25 April 2017, Coligny and nearby Lichtenburg experienced extensive rioting following the death of Matlhomola Jonas Moshoeu / Mosweu (15) from the Scotland informal settlement in Tlhabologang. He was believed to have died at the hands of two white farm managers at Rietvlei farm. The resulting violent protests, looting, and petrol bombing led to the destruction of property and local businesses, predominantly owned by whites, foreigners, and other minorities. Rian Malan, in an investigation into the causes of the rioting, stated that the unrest was further incited at Moshoeu's funeral by representatives of the SADTU and SANCO trade unions.

On 20 April 2017, two Afrikaner men, Doorewaard and Schutte, encountered Matlhomola Jonas Moshoeu and another boy carrying five stolen sunflower heads. The boys ran away, abandoning the sunflower heads. Moshoeu was apprehended by the farm managers and placed in the back of their pickup truck. While en route to the Coligny police station, approximately 3 km from town, Moshoeu reportedly disappeared from the truck's load bed, with the men claiming he had jumped off. Upon returning, they found Moshoeu critically injured on the road. A passerby was asked to look after him while the men proceeded to the police station to summon an ambulance. Moshoeu later died of his injuries on the way to a hospital in Lichtenburg.

On 24 April 2017, it was decided to charge the farm managers with murder. They turned themselves in to the police on 25 April and were charged and requested to hand over the pickup truck involved in the incident. They appeared before a magistrate court on 28 April 2017. Magistrate Mattheus van Loggerenberg, a Coligny resident, recused himself from the case, citing concerns for his safety and that of his family. The case was postponed to 9 May 2017 for a formal bail application. Further incidents of violence occurred after the two co-accused were released on bail, including the torching of a farmhouse, an attack on a photographer, and confrontations between protesters and farmers. Judge Ronald Hendricks of the High Court in Mahikeng sentenced the two men, Doorewaard and Schutte, to 18 and 23 years respectively, following the acceptance of testimony from the state witness, Mr. Pakisi.

However, on appeal, the men's conviction was overturned. The testimony of Mr. Pakisi, the sole evidence relied upon by the State, was deemed inconsistent and unreliable. No cartridge casings were found at the locations where Pakisi claimed he was shot at, and his timeline of events could not be reconciled with known times. The investigation failed to find or collect blood stains or samples in the vehicle, at any location where Moshoeu was allegedly assaulted, or on the jersey Pakisi reportedly used to wipe away Moshoeu's blood. The court found that the State did not prove its case beyond a reasonable doubt, leading to the acquittal of Doorewaard and Schutte after they had spent 13 months in jail. AfriForum funded the appeal costs, and its private prosecution unit provided support in the case investigation. In 2019, the Moshoeu family was donated a new house in Verdoorn Park, Coligny, by Gift of the Givers, on land donated by the Ditsobotla Local Municipality.
