= Heuningvlei =

Heuningvlei Tsoe Coe
- Location within Northern Cape Location within South Africa
- Coordinates: 26.291°S 23.182°E
- Country: South Africa
- Province: Northern Cape
- District: John Taolo Gaetsewe
- Municipality: Joe Morolong

Area
  - Total: 7.90 km^{2} (3.05 sq mi)

Population (2011)
  - Total: 2,656
  - Density: 336/km^{2} (871/sq mi)

Racial makeup (2011)
  - Black African: 98.9%
  - Coloured: 0.3%
  - Indian/Asian: 0.6%
  - White: 0.2%
  - Other: 0.1%

First languages (2011)
  - Tswana: 92.8%
  - S. Ndebele: 2.3%
  - English: 1.6%
  - Other: 3.2%
- Time zone: UTC+2 (SAST)
- Postal code (street): 8611
- Area code: 05492

Heuningvlei is a village in Joe Morolong Local Municipality in the Northern Cape province of South Africa. The name means "the hollow of the bees where water gathers".

Heuningvlei was formerly owned by Turner & Newall. Blue asbestos was mined at Heuningvlei until 1979, and many local residents suffer from asbestos-related diseases.
