= Ottosdal =

- Location within North West (South African province) Location within South Africa
- Coordinates: 26°48′S 26°00′E
- Country: South Africa
- Province: North West
- District: Ngaka Modiri Molema
- Municipality: Tswaing
- Established: 1913

Area
  - Total: 5.15 km^{2} (1.99 sq mi)

Population (2011)
  - Total: 884
  - Density: 172/km^{2} (445/sq mi)

Racial makeup (2011)
  - Black African: 31.9%
  - Coloured: 2.9%
  - Indian/Asian: 5.5%
  - White: 58.5%
  - Other: 1%

First languages (2011)
  - Tswana: 20.2%
  - Afrikaans: 61.7%
  - Xhosa: 2.1%
  - Sotho: 1.7%
  - English: 5.6%
- Time zone: UTC+2 (SAST)
- Postal code (street): 2610
- PO box: 2610
- Area code: 018

Ottosdal is a small town situated at an altitude of 1,479 meters (4,855 feet) on the branch railway line from Makwassie in the central North West Province of South Africa. Ottosdal is a farming community engaged in the growing of grains such as maize (mielies), sunflower and peanuts. In addition, local farmers raise cattle, sheep, pigs, dairy cows and chicken. A major pyrophyllite mine lies near it on the farm Gestoptefontein. This town originated from the establishment of a Dutch Reformed Church parish in 1913. To this was added a church building on Korannafontein, the farm of Gerhardus Petrus Otto. The town is known as the birthplace of "Die Baas", who was born there in 1952. Ottosdal grew around the church and was officially registered in 1917 and named after G. P. Otto (de Jager 1997).

== Climate ==
Ottosdal has a relatively hot and dry climate. Summers are very hot. Winter, which seldom last more than two to three months a year, is characterized by cold nights and mild to warm days. The average yearly rainfall is 550 mm (21.6 inches). Precipitation primarily occurs between October and April in the form of heavy thunderstorms during the mid-summer and light rain in the Autumn. Hail can occur between December and February and it only snows once a decade at most. Between August and October, strong winds and dust storms can occur (de Jager 1997).

== Cultural and historic sites ==
Some of the cultural and historical sites in and near Ottosdal are:

- Trenches, cemeteries and British forts dating to Second Boer War, which are located on the farms Gestoptefontein and Driekuil. Driekuil contains structures, which once were the headquarters of Major General Walter Kitchener, a major British Commanders in the western Transvaal. Also, there is the "Garden of Remembrance", which contains the graves of soldiers killed during the Second Boer War.
- The Ouplaas, one of the few surviving Boer mansions. It was built in 1907 for D. G. van der Merwe by the Italian architect, Sribante. It survives today as the Old Farm Guest House, "Ouplaas Gastehuis", which lies about 13 kilometers (8.1 mi) west of Ottosdal.
- The farm Rietkuil which belonged to Boer prophet Siener van Rensburg. He is buried, along with the members of various other Voortrekker families, near Ottosdal. His prophesies about the Boer War, the 1914–1915 rebellion, the death of General Koos de la Rey and other events brought him to prominence among the Boere and South Africans in general.
- Khoisan (Late Stone Age) Rock Engravings on local farms. This rock art included petroglyphs showing game such as elephants, rhinos, ostriches, lions, buffalo, baboons, snakes and giraffes, which once occurred locally in great abundance thousands of years ago.
- A collection of African artifacts housed in a 1910 farmhouse converted to a museum.
- An 1860 water mill, which has been dedicated as a national monument.
- A church belonging to the Dutch Reformed Church. It was built in 1918; used until 1955; and is now a national heritage site.
- and 30 kilometers (19 mi) from Ottosdal is the site of the Battle of Boschbult of the Second Boer War. It occurred on March 31, 1901.

== Pyrophyllite mines ==
A major industry of the Ottosdal area is the pyrophyllite mines located on the farm Gestoptefontein. These mines produce a very high quality pyrophyllite, which is a phyllosilicate mineral composed of aluminium silicate hydroxide: AlSi_{2}O_{5}OH. The pyrophyllite is a metamorphosed clay. The clay was formed by the alteration of volcanic ash, which apparently accumulated at the bottom of a quiet body of water. It forms a dense, but soft light grey, or darker, fine-grained stone, which splits into well-defined slabs. The strata, in which it occurs, is a 3.0 to 3.1 billion year-old, over 2 kilometer-thick assemblage of arenaceous sediments, conglomerates, grits, basic volcanics, tuffs, coarse pyroclastic rocks and quartzite called the "Dominion Group".

Originally, pyrophyllite was quarried and locally used for tombstones and building stone and to carve ornaments and utensils such as pots, dishes and cases. Currently, it is milled and processed near where it is mined to produce material used for the production of a wide variety of products. They include acid-resistant lab ceramics, refractory bricks and linings, filler in paint, electrical insulation, boilermaker's chalk, chromic-acid purification pots, and crucibles used in the manufacture polycrystalline-diamonds. Blocks of pyrophyllite are stilled quarried and sold as either "Wonderstone" or "African Stone" for sculpting. It can be easily carved with rasps and power tools and finished with a beautiful polish. The quarries are also the source of naturally grooved, spherical to disk-shaped, and sometimes intergrown concretions composed of either hematite, pyrite, or wollastonite, which are collected by gem, mineral, and rock collectors and subject of much folklore.
