= Nyoni, KwaZulu-Natal =

Nyoni
- Location within KwaZulu-Natal Location within South Africa
- Coordinates: 29.078°S 31.463°E
- Country: South Africa
- Province: KwaZulu-Natal
- District: iLembe
- Municipality: Mandeni

Area
  - Total: 0.81 km^{2} (0.31 sq mi)

Population (2011)
  - Total: 1,005
  - Density: 1,200/km^{2} (3,200/sq mi)

Racial makeup (2011)
  - Black African: 99.3%
  - Coloured: 0.1%
  - Indian/Asian: 0.5%
  - Other: 0.1%

First languages (2011)
  - Zulu: 86.8%
  - English: 4.4%
  - Afrikaans: 1.7%
  - S. Ndebele: 1.4%
  - Other: 5.8%
- Time zone: UTC+2 (SAST)
- PO box: 3802
- Area code: 032

Nyoni is a town in Ilembe District Municipality in the KwaZulu-Natal province of South Africa.
