= Ditsobotla Local Municipality =

Coordinates: 26°5′S 26°15′E

Ditsobotla
- Local municipality
- Seal

- Location in the North West
- Country: South Africa
- Province: North West
- District: Ngaka Modiri Molema
- Seat: Lichtenburg
- Wards: 21

Government
  - Type: Municipal council
  - Mayor: Tsholofelo Moreo

Area
  - Total: 6,465 km^{2} (2,496 sq mi)

Population (2011)
  - Total: 168,902
  - Density: 26.13/km^{2} (67.66/sq mi)

Racial makeup (2011)
  - Black African: 89.1%
  - Coloured: 1.9%
  - Indian/Asian: 0.6%
  - White: 8.2%

First languages (2011)
  - Tswana: 78.6%
  - Afrikaans: 9.8%
  - Xhosa: 3.0%
  - English: 2.4%
  - Other: 6.2%
- Time zone: UTC+2 (SAST)
- Municipal code: NW384

Ditsobotla Municipality (Tswana: Mmasepala wa Ditsobotla) is a local municipality within the Ngaka Modiri Molema District Municipality, in the North West province of South Africa. The seat of the municipality is Lichtenburg.

== Main places ==
The 2001 census divided the municipality into the following main places:

Place	Code	Area (km^{2})	Population	Most spoken language
Bakwena Ba Ga Serobatse	60901	2.37	1,392	Tswana
Banogeng	60902	0.72	502	Tswana
Boikhutso	60903	2.22	16,914	Tswana
Coligny	60904	3.50	2,271	Afrikaans
Ga-Raphalane	60906	26.34	24,104	Tswana
Itekeng	60907	0.35	2,591	Tswana
Itsoseng	60908	7.62	22,879	Tswana
Kopano	60909	6.78	8,325	Tswana
Lichtenburg	60910	87.13	11,927	Afrikaans
Mosiane	60911	1.73	1,056	Tswana
Tlhabologang	60912	0.63	5,852	Tswana
Remainder of the municipality	60905	6,325.49	45,059	Tswana

== Politics ==
The municipal council consists of thirty-nine members elected by mixed-member proportional representation. Twenty councillors are elected by first-past-the-post voting in twenty wards, while the remaining nineteen are chosen from party lists so that the total number of party representatives is proportional to the number of votes received.

In the election of 4 November 2026, no party won a majority. The African National Congress (ANC) won the most seats on the council.

The following table shows the results of the election.

Party	Ward			List			Total seats
Party	Votes	%	Seats	Votes	%	Seats	Total seats
African National Congress	16,053	39.55	18	16,106	39.49	0	18
Democratic Alliance	5,952	14.66	2	6,169	15.12	3	5
Economic Freedom Fighters	4,097	10.09	0	4,102	10.06	4	4
Save Ditsobotla Movement	2,539	6.25	0	2,460	6.03	2	2
Patriotic Alliance	2,222	5.47	0	1,837	4.50	2	2
uMkhonto weSizwe Party	1,872	4.61	0	1,706	4.18	2	2
ActionSA	1,501	3.70	0	1,635	4.01	2	2
Kopano Movement	1,383	3.41	0	1,371	3.36	1	1
Freedom Front Plus	1,157	2.85	0	1,186	2.91	1	1
South African Communist Party	1,180	2.91	0	1,122	2.75	1	1
African Transformation Movement	526	1.30	0	544	1.33	1	1
Independent candidates	20	0.05	0				0
16 other parties	2,090	5.15	0	2,549	6.25	0	0
Total	40,592	100.00	20	40,787	100.00	19	39
Valid votes	40,592	96.73		40,787	96.65		
Invalid/blank votes	1,374	3.27		1,413	3.35		
Total votes	41,966	100.00		42,200	100.00		
Registered voters/turnout	80,461	52.16		80,461	52.45		

== Municipal collapse ==
The municipality has experienced a collapse in basic services due to corruption, financial mismanagement and political instability. In 2025, it failed to submit financial reports to the Auditor General for scrutiny.

In November 2022, President Cyril Ramaphosa described it as "a town taken over by gangsterism".

The council was dissolved, and by-elections held in December 2022.

However, the situation did not improve, and in October 2023, the court ordered the council be placed under provincial intervention.

In April 2025, after continued deterioration, non-profit organisation Sakeliga is seeking the highest form of intervention, national intervention.

In July 2025, the court ordered the municipality to pay R7.5 million, plus interest, outstanding to a contractor. The contractor had completed electrical repairs in December 2023 according to its contract agreeing a fee of R7.6 million for the services. However, the municipality paid only R100,000, and then later claimed that the procurement was unlawful, making the contract invalid.

In September 2025, cabinet placed Ditsobotla under administration.
