= Itsoseng =

- Location within North West (South African province) Location within South Africa
- Coordinates: 26.083°S 25.882°E
- Country: South Africa
- Province: North West
- District: Ngaka Modiri Molema
- Municipality: Ditsobotla

Area
  - Total: 7.09 km^{2} (2.74 sq mi)

Population (2011)
  - Total: 19,959
  - Density: 2,820/km^{2} (7,290/sq mi)

Racial makeup (2011)
  - Black African: 99.2%
  - Coloured: 0.4%
  - Indian/Asian: 0.2%
  - Other: 0.2%

First languages (2011)
  - Tswana: 87.2%
  - English: 2.8%
  - Sotho: 2.6%
  - Xhosa: 2.2%
  - Other: 5.1%
- Time zone: UTC+2 (SAST)
- Postal code (street): 2744
- PO box: 2744
- Area code: 018

Itsoseng is a township in the Ngaka Modiri Molema District Municipality in the North West province of South Africa.

The township was established in 1963 on the farm De Hoop as a black township, and became part of Bophuthatswana in 1977. At that time, it was then renamed from De Hoop to Itsoseng.

Itsoseng was founded from Phase 1 whereby in those years there was a slogan made of poverty " pampiri tshwara tshwara, ngwana nnyeee mala korrrrr" in simple meaning referring to the peace and quietness of the place build on poverty. The developments started happening and the Phases increased until Phase 3.

Itsoseng was also known as "Mooi Doorpie" meaning beautiful town, the residents then converted this Afrikaans word to the Setswana word Tlebebe meaning luxury. Before Bophuthatswana uprising Itsoseng was providing a good service to its population and neighbouring villages like Bodibe, Sheila, Springbokpan, Meetmekaar, Matile, Uitkyk and Mooifontein just to name a few.
