= Lichtenburg, South Africa =

Town in North West Province, South Africa

Lichtenburg
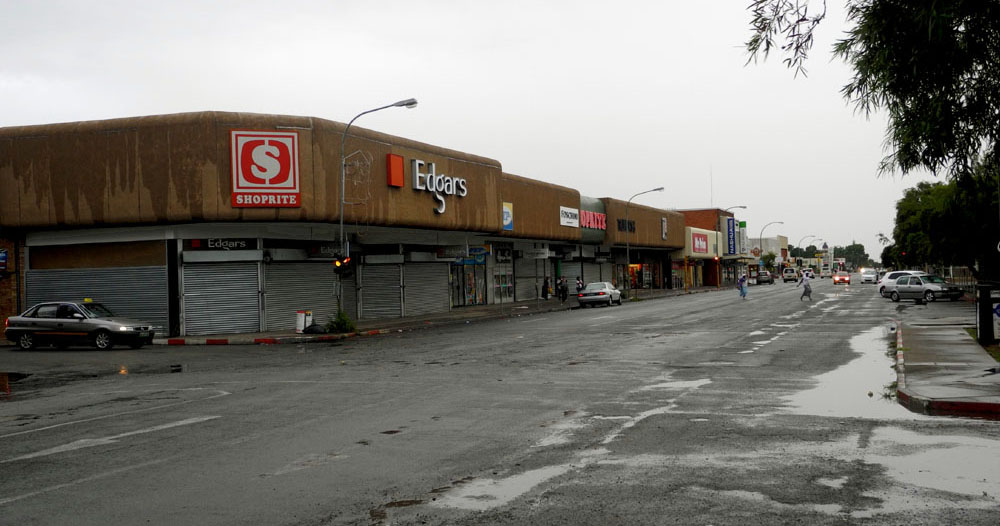

- Location within North West (South African province) Location within South Africa Location within Africa
- Coordinates: 26°09′S 26°10′E
- Country: South Africa
- Province: North West
- District: Central
- Municipality: Ditsobotla
- Established: 1873

Area
  - Total: 108.90 km^{2} (42.05 sq mi)
- Elevation: 1,459 m (4,787 ft)

Population (2011)
  - Total: 26,338
  - Density: 241.85/km^{2} (626.40/sq mi)

Racial makeup (2011)
  - Black African: 59.5%
  - Coloured: 7.9%
  - Indian/Asian: 1.9%
  - White: 30.3%
  - Other: 0.3%

First languages (2011)
  - Tswana: 52.5%
  - Afrikaans: 38.1%
  - English: 4.1%
  - Sotho: 1.1%
  - Other: 4.2%
- Time zone: UTC+2 (SAST)
- Postal code (street): 2740
- PO box: 2740
- Area code: 018

Lichtenburg (Afrikaans pronunciation: [ˈləχtənˌbœrəχ]) is a small town situated in North West Province, South Africa. It is the administrative centre of Ditsobotla Local Municipality.

The town was established in 1873 and was named by Transvaal President Thomas François Burgers as Lichtenburg (Town of Light). On the 13 March 1926, Jacobus Voorendyk, discovered a diamond on his family farm and within 12 months there were 108,000 fortune seekers on the scene. The resulting diamond rush lasted ten years.

The main economic activity is the production of maize (corn) and meat. Lichtenburg lies in the heart of the maize triangle, which is the main maize growing area in South Africa. Another major economic activity is the production of cement. Within an 80-kilometre (50 mi) radius of Lichtenburg there are four major cement producers, which creates opportunities for long-distance transport and related businesses.

== General information ==
Lichtenburg is situated approximately 230 kilometres (140 mi) west of Johannesburg on the main route to Mmabatho. It lies 1,459 metres (4,787 ft) above sea level. The climate is healthy and moderate. Frost occurs in winter but the days are pleasantly sunny. As a result of natural water resources and wide-open spaces it has a natural charm and is a true oasis in an otherwise slightly arid North West Province.

=== Climate ===
Lichtenburg has a steppe climate (Köppen climate classification BSk).

Climate data for Luchtenburg, elevation 1,487 m (4,879 ft), (1991–2020 normals, extremes 1998–2023)
Month	Jan	Feb	Mar	Apr	May	Jun	Jul	Aug	Sep	Oct	Nov	Dec	Year
Record high °C (°F)	39.5 (103.1)	35.1 (95.2)	35.6 (96.1)	32.6 (90.7)	29.1 (84.4)	26.9 (80.4)	27.2 (81.0)	29.7 (85.5)	34.6 (94.3)	37.0 (98.6)	37.1 (98.8)	39.0 (102.2)	39.5 (103.1)
Mean daily maximum °C (°F)	30.1 (86.2)	29.3 (84.7)	28.4 (83.1)	25.5 (77.9)	23.7 (74.7)	21.5 (70.7)	20.8 (69.4)	23.9 (75.0)	28.1 (82.6)	29.9 (85.8)	30.3 (86.5)	30.6 (87.1)	26.8 (80.3)
Daily mean °C (°F)	23.3 (73.9)	22.7 (72.9)	21.3 (70.3)	18.2 (64.8)	14.6 (58.3)	11.9 (53.4)	11.4 (52.5)	14.5 (58.1)	18.6 (65.5)	21.4 (70.5)	22.2 (72.0)	23.3 (73.9)	18.6 (65.5)
Mean daily minimum °C (°F)	16.5 (61.7)	16.1 (61.0)	14.3 (57.7)	10.9 (51.6)	5.5 (41.9)	2.4 (36.3)	2.0 (35.6)	5.1 (41.2)	9.2 (48.6)	12.7 (54.9)	14.0 (57.2)	16.0 (60.8)	10.4 (50.7)
Record low °C (°F)	10.9 (51.6)	9.8 (49.6)	4.2 (39.6)	−0.5 (31.1)	−3.8 (25.2)	−5.1 (22.8)	−8.6 (16.5)	−5.8 (21.6)	−1.4 (29.5)	1.9 (35.4)	1.8 (35.2)	7.5 (45.5)	−8.6 (16.5)
Average precipitation mm (inches)	115.2 (4.54)	93.4 (3.68)	92.1 (3.63)	47.1 (1.85)	16.9 (0.67)	6.2 (0.24)	4.9 (0.19)	4.8 (0.19)	14.3 (0.56)	42.8 (1.69)	73.0 (2.87)	93.1 (3.67)	603.8 (23.78)
Average precipitation days (≥ 0.25 mm)	9.6	7.9	8.1	4.6	2.1	0.8	0.8	0.6	1.6	4.7	7.0	8.5	56.3
Source: Starlings Roost Weather (preciptiation 1903–2005)

== History ==
Lichtenburg was established in 1873 by Commandant H.A. Greeff. The history of the town is closely associated with the life of General De la Rey, who, apart from being the town's representative in the House of Assembly, was also Assistant Commandant General of the Boer forces. After Unification he also became Senator. He was buried in Lichtenburg after a fatal shooting incident at Langlaagte. More and more farmers settled in the area during the mid to late 1800s.

In 2000, the town's Jewish cemetery was the target of anti-semitic vandalism. 60 graves were targeted, breaking over thirty tombstones and pushing over the remainder.

The town was the scene of large scale violent protests on the 25 April 2017 when protests for more public housing turned violent and led to significant property damage and looting of local businesses.

=== Boer War ===
The First Anglo-Boer War (1880–1881), was a rebellion of Boers (farmers) against British rule in the Transvaal that re-established their independence. The conflict occurred against the backdrop of the Pretoria government becoming increasingly ineffective at dealing with growing claims on South African land from rival interests within the country. The Second War (1899–1902), by contrast, was a lengthy war—involving large numbers of troops from many British possessions, which ended with the conversion of the Boer republics into British colonies (with a promise of limited self-governance). These colonies later formed part of the Union of South Africa. The British fought directly against the Transvaal and the Orange Free State, eventually defeating their forces through the use of the "Scorched Earth" policy. Lord Kitchener had enacted this brutal and inhumane policy after a long and bitter guerrilla campaign waged by the Boers which led the British to incur high losses due to both disease and the unconventional combat tactics used by the Boers. This war saw so many nationalities fighting against each other, and was at the same time a civil war involving Afrikaner against Afrikaner, and South African English-speakers, as well as many black combatants, fighting and dying on both sides.

Rudyard Kipling's poem "Lichtenberg" relates the story of one Australian combatant and his journey towards death in a foreign land. Trooper Aberline's sacrifice influenced the Boers and his legacy went far beyond his rusting cross in the Lichtenburg cemetery which lies close to that of Edith Mathews.

There was some silly fire on the flank
And the small wet drizzling down -
There were the sold-out shops and the bank
And the wet, wide-open town;
And we were doing escort-duty
To somebody's escort-train,
And I smelt wattle by Lichtenberg -
Riding in, in the rain.

Like many British sources, Kipling spelt Lichtenburg incorrectly. There have never been groves of wattle near Lichtenburg. Quite probably, however, Kipling was referring to the scent of wild acacia in bloom, which would have reminded the Australian soldier of the wattle back home (Acacia mearnsii). The scents, and indeed the small yellow flowers, are quite similar. Just one more connection between the two continents that the poet is alluding to.

In May 1900 the Siege of Mafeking ended and hostilities quickly engulfed the whole of the northern Cape and western Transvaal (this region has now been incorporated into the North-West Province). Between June and November 1900, the Anglo-Boer War evolved into its guerrilla phase, and fighting see-sawed throughout the territory. During this period the strategically important town of Lichtenburg was occupied by both Boer and Briton for short spells. In November 1900, a large British force under Col. Robert Baden-Powell was transferred to Lichtenburg and secured the town, and much of the territory with it.

Five months later, on 3 March 1901, 400 Boers under the co-joint commands of Generals De la Rey, Smuts, Celliers, Vermaas and Lemmer launched a mounted attack on the town. In a fierce but inconclusive engagement lasting a full day and much of the night, fourteen Boers and eighteen British soldiers were killed, whilst 38 Boers and 24 British soldiers were wounded. As he rode away, De la Rey was heard to remark, "The enemy has received a good hiding and so did I".

== Notable people ==
Persons of note born in Lichtenburg include Ferdi Hartzenberg (b. 8 January 1936) who served as South Africa's Minister of Education from 1979 to 1982 and as the final leader of the Conservative Party of South Africa from 1993 to 2004.

== Economy ==
=== Industries ===
Several factories manufacturing, among other things, liquid fertilizer, animal feed and agricultural implements are established here. Two of the largest cement factories in the Southern Hemisphere, AfriSam Dudfield (previously Anglo Alpha) and Lafarge (previously Blue Circle Cement), are situated here, as well as the country's biggest cheese factory (Clover S.A.).

=== Business ===
The central business area consists of approximately 150 retail undertakings, 20 financial institutions and many other service institutions. Shop and office accommodation is available as well as select business sites adjoining the central business area.

== Sport ==
=== Motor Sport ===
The Lichtenburg Sports Car Club is affiliated with the South African Motor Sports body and motor car and motor cycle races—both on the race track and offroad—represented here, attract well-known racing drivers. Peet Swart, a well known track athlete, is situated in Lichtenburg.

== Places and Tourism ==
=== Lichtenburg Diggings Museum ===
The theme of the museum is the alluvial diamant diggings of this region from 1925 to 1935, then the richest public diggings in the world. The biggest pure red diamond (flawless) ("pigeon blood red") in the world was found here in 1927. The stone was of 33 carats (6.6 g). It was sold for 66 pounds and was later valued at $150,000. The stone would be worth more than $6 million today and is the purest red diamond in the world. The biggest diamond rush in history took place in March 1927 on the farm Grasfontein near Lichtenburg, when 25,000 runners took part to peg their claims. The town accommodates a social-historical museum and an Agricultural museum with a big collection of antique tractors and many other objects, and the new Digging Museum. The Museum is no more it was burned down in a senseless act. None of the above museums are present any more in the town all was destroyed or looted.

=== Bakerville ===
Approximately 20 kilometres (12 mi) north of Lichtenburg lies the world-renowned diamond diggings over an area of more or less 35 kilometres (22 mi) from east to west, known as "Bakerville". Bakerville is on the Zeerust Road.

It was the richest public diggings ever mined—it was the Lichtenburg Diamond Rush of February 1926 and a population of 150,000 souls appeared as if by magic. Bakerville, or "Bakers" as it was known it the time, it is only one of several "Diggers Towns", developed in Wild West style. Bakerville was the biggest and most famous of the towns. Bigger than Cape Town at the time, the Lichtenburg district made many men rich but broke thousands of hearts.

By 1928 the rush was over. Today a smattering of "bitter-einders" remain, optimists all, still digging through tonnes of gravel heaps in the never-ending search for the 'Big One'.

=== Public Library ===
A modern public library and an art gallery which is one of the biggest in the country, housing a valuable collection of paintings by well-known South African artists are situated in a wing of the Civic centre. Paintings of Gregoire Boonzaier, Irmin Henkel, Irma Stern, Louis Steyn, Walter Battiss, Dirk Meerkotter, F. Claerhout, Bettie Cilliers-Barnard, Johannes Meintjes and the sculptor Hennie Potgieter form part of the collection. It is not currently Open

=== Burning Vlei ===
The vlei which separates Lichtenburg from its biggest suburb, Kieserville, is unique in as much as the thick layers of peat (which is the product of millions of years of marsh vegetation and the forerunner of coal) had for decades been burning subterraneously, creating a great hazard for man and beast. Very few such phenomena occur worldwide. Presently, due to the stemming of the flow of vlei water, the burning has ceased and water sport is being practised on the two resulting dams. During the 1984 drought the vlei again started burning in places. The Dauth-Roode and Centenary dams provide opportunity for water sport. A nine-hole golf course is kept in excellent condition and is quite a challenge for the keen golfer.

=== Hoërskool Lichtenburg ===
Hoërskool Lichtenburg is well known throughout the North West province and even in the Gauteng province for sports and academics. It is an Afrikaans medium school of over a thousand learners from all over the district, even from Botswana. The school has always prided itself in top performance, tradition and culture. There are two large boarding houses. These are mainly populated by teens from the surrounding farms. Hoërskool Lichtenburg excels at sport, especially when it comes to rugby and hockey. Its greatest rivals are schools in the Potchefstroom area and schools in Rustenburg. In academics it also excels. For the last few years it has seen a 100% matric pass rate. Notable people who went to Hoërskool Lichtenburg include Hestrie Cloete (Olympic silver medallist) and Kieka Mynhardt (mathematician).

==== Notable Athletes ====
Lichtenburg has produced a number of notable athletes over the years including Richard Bands, who represented South Africa as a Springbok rugby player in 11 tests and scored one of the best ever tries by a prop in international rugby. Hestrie Cloete was a world class high jump athlete. Clerke Scholtz, 1936 Berlin Olympics athlete

=== Wondergat ===
Approximately 40 kilometres (25 mi) on the Mafikeng road lies Wondergat (25.86956°S 25.88978°E). It is one of the deepest sinkholes in South Africa where freshwater diving can be practised. Diving courses are available at the site and it is one of the popular inland diving places in the country.

=== Unique breeding centre ===
Two kilometres north-east of Lichtenburg is a unique game breeding centre, operated by the National Zoological Gardens of South Africa measuring 4,500 hectares (11,000 acres), where game such as addax, mhorr gazelle and the pygmy hippopotamus of West Africa are bred. White rhino, blue wildebeest, zebra, impala, gemsbok and many other species are to be seen in their natural surroundings.

Abundant water in the area creates a habitat for numerous water and other bird species like ducks, coots, herons, secretary birds and vultures. The Willie Marnewick Birdhide is one of the largest of its kind in the country and it enables birdwatchers to look more closely at the birdlife. Barbecue facilities have also been provided, and special night drives can be arranged. Animals bred at the center are supplied to international and local zoos and game farms. people may become members of the Friends of the Zoo Society. Self-catering facilities are available in the centre. The breeding center has gone to waste and was sold off to a private owner.

=== Monuments ===
- On General De la Rey Square in front of the Town Hall:
  - A twice life size statue of General De la Rey mounted on his horse Bokkie. This work of art is the creation of sculptor Hennie Potgieter in February 1965, who grew up in the Lichtenburg district.
  - The Burger Monument engraved with the names of 87 burghers of Lichtenburg and district who fell during the Anglo-Boer War.
  - Memorials erected during the 1938 Symbolic Ox Wagon trek.
  - The Afrikaans Language Monument designed by Hennie Potgieter and erected during the 1975 language centenary festival.
- The Greeff memorial at Witklip 10 kilometres (6.2 mi) north east of Lichtenburg in commemoration of the founder of Lichtenburg, H.A. Creeff.
- The grave of General De la Rey is in the Lichtenburg cemetery with a bronze bust of General De la Rey created by Fanie Elof
- A small Voortrekker monument is erected on Elandsfontein, General De la Rey's farm, in commemoration of the late Boer leader.
- A historical cattle dip on the farm Elandsputte, 20 kilometres (12 mi) north of Lichtenburg was declared a national monument.
- The Gruisfontein battle field 24 kilometres (15 mi) east of Lichtenburg, where a monument has been erected in honour of the burghers who fell there.

=== Historical buildings ===
- The Dutch Reformed Church in Gerrit Maritz Street erected in 1890 (Declared a National Monument).
- The old magistrate's building dates from 1895/96.
- The home where General De la Rey lived, 3 km west of town, was demolished during the Anglo-Boer War. During 1902 it was rebuilt on the original foundations.
- The home of the founder, H.A. Greeff, built in 1875 on Manana, 10 km east of Lichtenburg, is still standing.
- An old plantation house, home of the pioneer in dry-land farming, Col. H du Tolt, erected in 1910 south of town is still in use as a dwelling.

== Rioting in Lichtenburg ==
On 25 April 2017, Lichtenburg was the scene of extensive rioting following the alleged murder of a 17-year-old boy in nearby Coligny for allegations related to stealing sunflowers on a farm. The incident sparked violent protests, looting and destruction of property and local businesses predominantly owned by whites.
