= Ramotshere Moiloa Local Municipality =

Coordinates: 25°15′S 26°5′E

Ramotshere Moiloa
- Local municipality
- Seal

- Location in the North West
- Country: South Africa
- Province: North West
- District: Ngaka Modiri Molema
- Seat: Zeerust
- Wards: 20

Government
  - Type: Municipal council
  - Mayor: Moji Peter Pilane

Area
  - Total: 7,193 km^{2} (2,777 sq mi)

Population (2011)
  - Total: 150,713
  - Density: 20.95/km^{2} (54.27/sq mi)

Racial makeup (2011)
  - Black African: 94.4%
  - Coloured: 0.9%
  - Indian/Asian: 0.7%
  - White: 3.8%

First languages (2011)
  - Tswana: 86.0%
  - Afrikaans: 4.5%
  - English: 3.8%
  - Xhosa: 1.2%
  - Other: 4.5%
- Time zone: UTC+2 (SAST)
- Municipal code: NW385

Ramotshere Moiloa Municipality (Tswana: Mmasepala wa Ramotshere Moiloa), formerly Zeerust Municipality, is a local municipality within the Ngaka Modiri Molema District Municipality, in the North West province of South Africa. The seat of the municipality is Zeerust.

== History ==
The municipality is named after Kgosi Abram Ramotshere Moiloa (1910-1982), a key figure in the Bahurutshe resistance of the 1950s. Kgosi Moiloa was banished by the Apartheid Government in 1957 after he refused to enforce the carrying of passbooks by Hurutshe women as obliged by apartheid law. The women of Dinokana had largely refused to carry the passbooks, and Kgosi Moiloa had supported their decision. At the first meeting held by the native commissioner, 1000 women gathered but only 70 passbooks were taken out, Kgosi Moiloa was deposed a week later. His banishment order was revoked on 1 January 1971. Today, in acknowledgment of his contributions to the struggle for democracy the local municipality bears his name.

== Main places ==
The 2001 census divided the municipality into the following main places:

Place	Code	Area (km^{2})	Population	Most spoken language
Bahurutshe Ba Ga Gopane	61001	485.86	19,067	Tswana
Bahurutshe Ba Ga Le-Ncoe	61002	260.43	9,743	Tswana
Bahurutshe Ba Ga Moilwa	61003	920.24	48,517	Tswana
Bahurutshe Ba Ga Mokgoswa	61004	99.47	1,474	Tswana
Bahurutshe Ba Ga Mothogae	61005	31.64	123	Tswana
Bahurutshe Ba Ga Suping	61006	178.15	2,794	Tswana
Bahurutshe Bo Manyane	61007	155.26	5,205	Tswana
Banabakae	61008	43.01	8,555	Tswana
Ikageleng	61009	1.36	6,562	Tswana
Leeufontein	61010	10.85	5,685	Tswana
Madikwe Part 1	61011	3.61	1,191	Tswana
Madikwe Part 2	61016	2.90	985	Tswana
Marico Nature Reserve	61012	18.76	352	Tswana
Mixed TA	61013	144.32	0	-
Welbedacht	61014	5.81	5,993	Tswana
Zeerust	61017	11.02	6,393	Afrikaans
Remainder of the municipality	61015	4,818.77	14,795	Tswana

== Politics ==
The municipal council consists of thirty-seven members elected by mixed-member proportional representation. Nineteen councillors are elected by first-past-the-post voting in nineteen wards, while the remaining eighteen are chosen from party lists so that the total number of party representatives is proportional to the number of votes received.

In the election of 4 November 2026, no party won a majority. The African National Congress (ANC) won the most seats on the council.

The following table shows the results of the election.

Party	Ward			List			Total seats
Party	Votes	%	Seats	Votes	%	Seats	Total seats
African National Congress	15,926	43.57	18	15,928	43.38	0	18
ActionSA	6,564	17.96	1	6,757	18.40	5	6
Economic Freedom Fighters	3,593	9.83	0	3,521	9.59	3	3
African Independent National Democratic Caucus	2,972	8.13	0	2,931	7.98	3	3
Democratic Alliance	2,014	5.51	0	2,120	5.77	2	2
Freedom Front Plus	1,030	2.82	0	1,069	2.91	1	1
South African Communist Party	864	2.36	0	839	2.29	1	1
United Christian Democratic Party	718	1.96	0	844	2.30	1	1
uMkhonto weSizwe Party	572	1.57	0	570	1.55	1	1
Patriotic Alliance	594	1.63	0	532	1.45	1	1
Independent candidates	259	0.71	0				0
9 other parties	1,443	3.95	0	1,606	4.37	0	0
Total	36,549	100.00	19	36,717	100.00	18	37
Valid votes	36,549	96.92		36,717	96.57		
Invalid/blank votes	1,160	3.08		1,305	3.43		
Total votes	37,709	100.00		38,022	100.00		
Registered voters/turnout	77,662	48.56		77,662	48.96		
