= Delareyville =

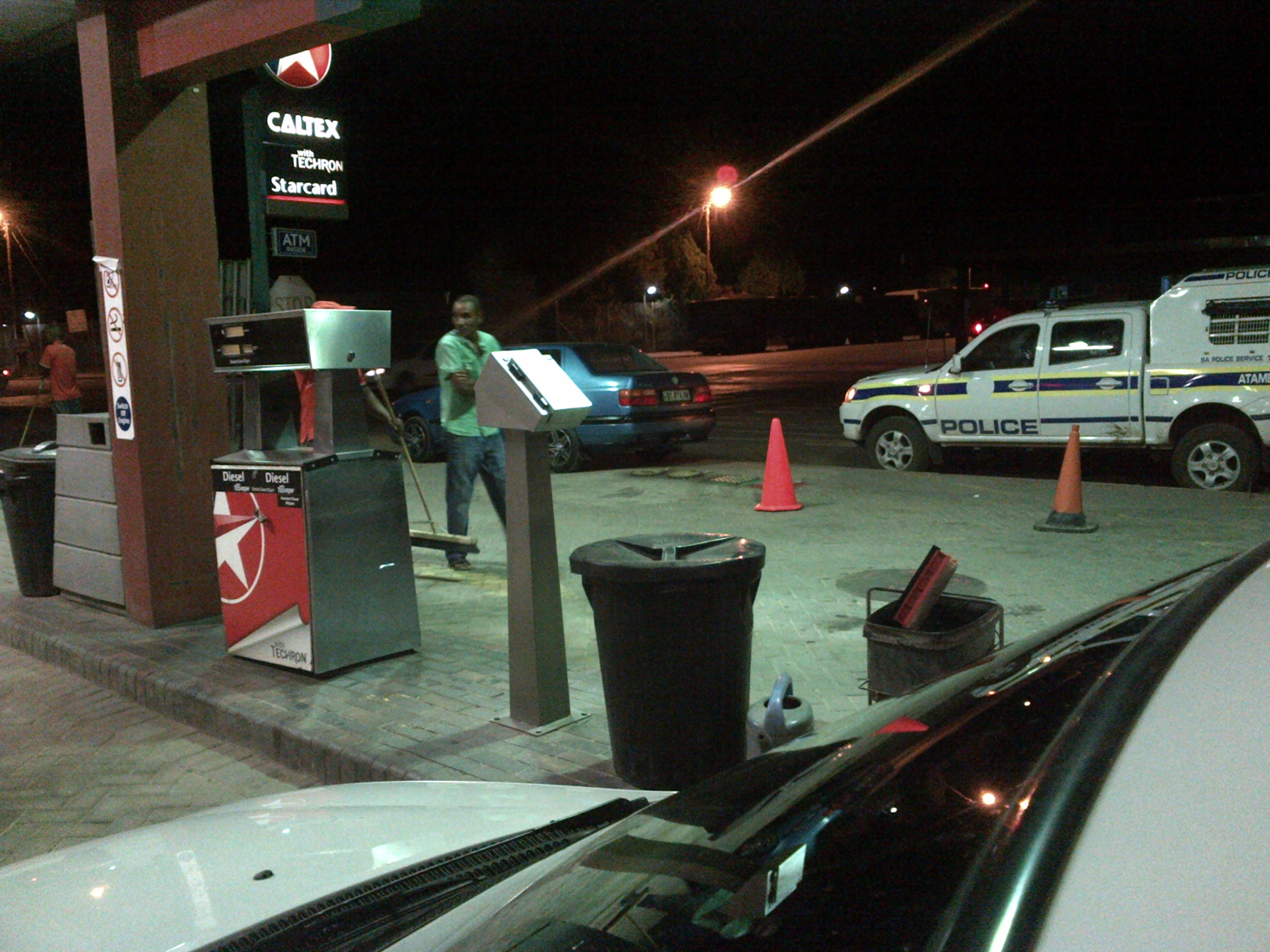
- Delareyville, 2770, South Africa

- Location within North West (South African province) Location within South Africa Location within Africa
- Coordinates: 26°41′0″S 25°28′0″E
- Country: South Africa
- Province: North West
- District: Ngaka Modiri Molema
- Municipality: Tswaing

Area
  - Total: 36.53 km^{2} (14.10 sq mi)

Population (2011)
  - Total: 10,630
  - Density: 291.0/km^{2} (753.7/sq mi)

Racial makeup (2011)
  - Black African: 88.2%
  - Coloured: 2.0%
  - Indian/Asian: 0.8%
  - White: 8.3%
  - Other: 0.7%

First languages (2011)
  - Tswana: 77.7%
  - Afrikaans: 10.3%
  - English: 5.1%
  - Sotho: 2.3%
  - Other: 4.6%
- Time zone: UTC+2 (SAST)
- Postal code (street): 2770
- PO box: 2770
- Area code: 053

Delareyville is a salt mining, Transnet Agricultural Freight and commercial station, railway station for maize- and peanut-farming town situated in North West Province of South Africa. The town is 96 km south-west of Lichtenburg, 82 km north-east of Vryburg, 114 km north-west of Wolmaransstad, and 61 km north of Schweizer-Reneke.

== History ==
It was laid out in 1914 and declared a border industry area in 1968. It was named after Jacobus Herculaas (Koos) de la Rey (1847-1914), General of the Boer forces in the Anglo-Boer War.

== Economy ==
=== Agriculture ===
The area is known for the cultivation of maize, groundnuts, sorghum and sheep and cattle farming.

=== Mining ===
Salt is mined from the many pans in the area.
