= Ngaka Modiri Molema District Municipality =

Ngaka Modiri Molema
- District municipality
- Location in South Africa
- Coordinates: 25°55′S 25°50′E
- Country: South Africa
- Province: North West
- Seat: Mafikeng
- Local municipalities: List: Ratlou; Tswaing; Mafikeng; Ditsobotla; Ramotshere Moiloa

Government
  - Type: Municipal council
  - Mayor: Tshepo Justice Makolomakwa

Area
  - Total: 28,206 km^{2} (10,890 sq mi)

Population (2011)
  - Total: 842,699
  - Density: 29.877/km^{2} (77.380/sq mi)

Racial makeup (2011)
  - Black African: 93.9%
  - Coloured: 1.6%
  - Indian/Asian: 0.6%
  - White: 3.7%

First languages (2011)
  - Tswana: 81.8%
  - Afrikaans: 5.0%
  - English: 3.2%
  - Xhosa: 2.7%
  - Other: 7.3%
- Time zone: UTC+2 (SAST)
- Municipal code: DC38

The Ngaka Modiri Molema District Municipality (Tswana: Mmasepala wa Sedika wa Ngaka Modiri Molema), formerly the Central District Municipality, is one of the four districts of the North West province of South Africa. Its capital is Mafikeng, which is also the capital of the province. It was named after Dr. Silas Molema (1891-1965), a South African doctor, politician, activist, and historian who was born in Mafeking.

== Geography ==
=== Neighbours ===
Ngaka Modiri Molema District has the following neighbours:

- The Republic of Botswana to the north
- Dr Ruth Segomotsi Mompati District Municipality to the west
- Dr Kenneth Kaunda District Municipality to the south
- Bojanala Platinum District Municipality district to the east
- Waterberg District Municipality (Limpopo province) to the north-east

=== Local municipalities ===
The district contains the following local municipalities:

Local municipality	Population	%	Dominant language
Mafeking	291 527	34.59%	Setswana
Ditsobotla	168 902	20.04%	Setswana
Ramotshere Moiloa	150 713	17.88%	Setswana
Tswaing	124 218	14.74%	Setswana
Ratlou	107 339	12.74%	Setswana

== Demographics ==
The following statistics are from the 2011 census.

Language	Population	%
Setswana	681,327	81.78%
Afrikaans	41,808	5.02%
English	27,017	3.24%
IsiXhosa	22,336	2.68%
Sesotho	20,780	2.49%
IsiZulu	12,750	1.53%
Other	9,952	1.19%
IsiNdebele	7,883	0.95%
Sepedi	3,277	0.39%
Sign language	3,035	0.36%
Xitsonga	1,631	0.20%
Tshivenda	697	0.08%
SiSwati	678	0.08%

=== Gender ===
Gender	Population	%
Female	429,300	50.94%
Male	413,399	49.06%

=== Ethnic group ===
Ethnic group	Population (2011)	%
Black African	791,251	93.89%
White	30,950	3.67%
Coloured	13,809	1.64%
Indian/Asian	4,968	0.59%

=== Age ===
Age	Population	%
000 - 004	82 826	10.86%
005 - 009	88 869	11.65%
010 - 014	92 003	12.06%
015 - 019	88 529	11.60%
020 - 024	70 530	9.24%
025 - 029	59 967	7.86%
030 - 034	53 025	6.95%
035 - 039	48 171	6.31%
040 - 044	42 075	5.51%
045 - 049	32 569	4.27%
050 - 054	25 227	3.31%
055 - 059	21 085	2.76%
060 - 064	17 893	2.35%
065 - 069	13 514	1.77%
070 - 074	10 638	1.39%
075 - 079	8 010	1.05%
080 - 084	4 675	0.61%
085 - 089	2 016	0.26%
090 - 094	845	0.11%
095 - 099	386	0.05%
100 plus	138	0.02%

== Politics ==
=== Election results ===
Election results for Ngaka Modiri Molema District in the South African general election, 2004.

- Population 18 and over: 446 018 [58.46% of total population]
- Total votes: 254 874 [33.40% of total population]
- Voting % estimate: 57.14% votes as a % of population 18 and over

Party	Votes	%
African National Congress	196 318	77.03%
United Christian Democratic Party	37 610	14.76%
Democratic Alliance	8 166	3.20%
Freedom Front Plus	2 636	1.03%
African Christian Democratic Party	2 130	0.84%
Pan African Congress	2 059	0.81%
United Democratic Movement	1 634	0.64%
New National Party	915	0.36%
Independent Democrats	848	0.33%
Azanian People's Organisation	593	0.23%
Inkhata Freedom Party	423	0.17%
SOPA	317	0.12%
EMSA	259	0.10%
PJC	175	0.07%
NA	170	0.07%
CDP	158	0.06%
TOP	140	0.05%
UF	133	0.05%
KISS	66	0.03%
Minority Front	63	0.02%
NLP	61	0.02%
Total	254 874	100.00%
