= R504 (South Africa) =

Regional route in South Africa

Regional route R504

Route information
- Length: 210 km (130 mi)

Major junctions
- West end: N18 at Pudimoe
- R34 / R506 at Schweizer-Reneke; N12 / R505 at Wolmaransstad; R502 at Leeudoringstad
- East end: R30 / R59 near Bothaville

Location
- Country: South Africa

Highway system
- Numbered routes of South Africa
← R503	→ R505

The R504 is a Regional Route in South Africa that connects Pudimoe with Bothaville via Amalia, Schweizer-Reneke, Wolmaransstad and Leeudoringstad.

== Route ==
It begins at a junction with the N18 in the village of Pudimoe, North West, and runs east. The first town it passes through is Amalia. It then reaches Schweizer-Reneke, where it intersects with the R506 and the R34. The next town it passes through is Wolmaransstad, where it crosses the R505 and the N12 and is briefly co-signed with both. It then passes through Witpoort to reach Leeudoringstad, where it meets the R502 at a staggered junction. Crossing the Vaal River, it enters the Free State, where it ends in Bothaville (3.5 km north of the town centre) at a four-way intersection with the R30 and the R59.
