= R502 (South Africa) =

Regional route in South Africa

Regional route R502

Route information
- Length: 125 km (78 mi)

Major junctions
- North-east end: N12 near Stilfontein
- R30 at Orkney; R504 at Leeudoringstad; R505 at Makwassie
- South-west end: N12 near Makwassie

Location
- Country: South Africa

Highway system
- Numbered routes of South Africa
← R501	→ R503

The R502 is a Regional Route in South Africa.

== Route ==
It originates from the N12 between Potchefstroom and Stilfontein in the North West. It runs in a south-westerly direction, north of the Vaal River and roughly paralleling the N12. It first bypasses the Hartebeestfontein Mine, the Buffelsfontein mine and the Vaal Reefs mine before it passes through the town of Orkney, where it intersects with the R30. It continues through Leeudoringstad, where it is briefly co-signed with the R504. The last town it passes through is Makwassie where it is again briefly co-signed with the R505. A few kilometres after Makwassie, the road ends at another junction with the N12.
