= Mamusa Local Municipality =

Coordinates: 27°15′S 25°15′E

Mamusa
- Local municipality
- Seal

- Location in the North West
- Country: South Africa
- Province: North West
- District: Dr Ruth Segomotsi Mompati
- Seat: Schweizer-Reneke
- Wards: 8

Government
  - Type: Municipal council
  - Mayor: (ANC)

Area
  - Total: 3,615 km^{2} (1,396 sq mi)

Population (2011)
  - Total: 60,355
  - Density: 16.70/km^{2} (43.24/sq mi)

Racial makeup (2011)
  - Black African: 91.4%
  - Coloured: 2.2%
  - Indian/Asian: 0.5%
  - White: 5.5%

First languages (2011)
  - Tswana: 85.1%
  - Afrikaans: 7.2%
  - Sotho: 2.2%
  - English: 1.7%
  - Other: 3.8%
- Time zone: UTC+2 (SAST)
- Municipal code: NW393

Mamusa Municipality (Tswana: Mmasepala wa Mamusa) is a local municipality within the Dr Ruth Segomotsi Mompati District Municipality, in the North West province of South Africa. The seat of the municipality is Schweizer-Reneke.

== Politics ==
The municipal council consists of sixteen members elected by mixed-member proportional representation. Eight are elected by first-past-the-post voting in eight wards, while the remaining eight are chosen from party lists so that the total number of party representatives is proportional to the number of votes received.

In the election of 4 November 2026 the African National Congress (ANC) lost its majority, but remains the largest party on seven seats.

The following table shows the results of the 2026 election.

Party	Ward			List			Total seats
Party	Votes	%	Seats	Votes	%	Seats	Total seats
African National Congress	7,203	43.80	7	7,294	45.54	0	7
Economic Freedom Fighters	2,573	15.65	0	2,610	16.30	3	3
South African Communist Party	1,542	9.38	0	1,530	9.55	1	1
Freedom Front Plus	1,355	8.24	1	1,315	8.21	0	1
ActionSA	780	4.74	0	768	4.80	1	1
Afrika Mayibuye Movement	617	3.75	0	607	3.79	1	1
Democratic Alliance	575	3.50	0	580	3.62	1	1
uMkhonto weSizwe Party	558	3.39	0	554	3.46	1	1
Independent candidates	587	3.57	0				0
5 other parties	656	3.99	0	758	4.73	0	0
Total	16,446	100.00	8	16,016	100.00	8	16
Valid votes	16,446	96.34		16,016	94.31		
Invalid/blank votes	624	3.66		967	5.69		
Total votes	17,070	100.00		16,983	100.00		
Registered voters/turnout	33,578	50.84		33,578	50.58		

== Geography ==
The municipality covers an area of 3,615 square kilometres (1,396 sq mi) in the south-west part of North West province. At the time of the 2011 census it has a population of 60,355. According to the census, the predominant language in the municipality is Setswana, spoken by 85.1% of the population, followed by Afrikaans (7.2%), Sesotho (2.2%) and English (1.7%). 91.5% of the population identified as "Black African", 5.5% as "White", 2.2% as "Coloured", and 0.5% as "Indian or Asian". The 2016 Community Survey estimated that the population had increased to 64,000.

The principal town is Schweizer-Reneke, located in the centre of the municipality, which (including the township of Ipelegeng) had a population of 41,226 in 2011. Other settlements include Amalia (pop. 5,481) to the west, and Migdol (pop. 3,526) and Glaudina (pop. 2,368) to the north-east.

Roads radiate outwards from Schweizer-Reneke towards Vryburg, Delareyville, Wolmaransstad, Bloemhof, Christiana and Pudimoe. The road from Vryburg to Bloemhof is designated as provincial route R34, while the others are designated as regional routes R504 (Pudimoe–Wolmaransstad) and R506 (Christiana–Delareyville). The Coligny–Vermaas–Pudimoe railway line also passes through the municipality.

== Financial mismanagement ==
In January 2025, the municipality was listed as one of the top ten municipalities in arrears on their pension contributions.
