= R505 (South Africa) =

Regional Route in South Africa

Regional route R505

Route information
- Length: 266 km (165 mi)

Major junctions
- South end: R719 near Wesselsbron
- R59; R502 in Makwassie; N12 / R504 in Wolmaransstad; R507 in Ottosdal; N14 near Biesiesvlei; R52 / R503 in Lichtenburg
- North end: R49 near Ottoshoop

Location
- Country: South Africa

Highway system
- Numbered routes of South Africa
← R504	→ R506

The R505 is a Regional Route in South Africa. It connects Ottoshoop, North West Province in the north with Wesselsbron, Free State Province to the south.

== Route ==
=== North West ===
Its northern terminus is a junction with the R49 in the village of Ottoshoop, North West. From there it runs southwards for 50 km, past Bakerville, to Lichtenburg, where it enters as Thabo Mbeki Drive and reaches a junction with the R503.

The R503 joins the R505 on Thabo Mbeki Drive southwards before they become Republiek Street eastwards to reach a junction with the R52 route (Dr Nelson Mandela Drive) in the town centre. The R503 & R505 join the R52 southwards on Dr Nelson Mandela Drive for 2 kilometres up to the junction with 12th Avenue, where the R52 becomes its own road south-west. At the next junction, the R505 splits from the R503 to become its own road southwards.

From Lichtenburg, the R505 continues southwards for 76 kilometres, meeting the N14 national route, to pass through the town centre of Ottosdal as Swart Street, where it intersects with the R507 (Voortrekker Street). From Ottosdal, the R505 continues southwards for 43 kilometres to reach a junction with the R504 in Wolmaransstad. The R505 joins the R504 and they are one road eastwards for 2 km, reaching a junction with the N12 national route. The R505 then becomes co-signed with the N12 south-west for 2.5 km before becoming its own road southwards in Wolmaransstad's southern suburbs.

From Wolmaransstad, the R505 heads southwards for 10 km to the town of Makwassie, where it crosses the R502 at a staggered junction. From Makwassie, it resumes southwards for 37 km to cross the Vaal River into the Free State.

=== Free State ===
From the Vaal River crossing, the R505 heads south-east for 11 km to reach a junction with the R59. It proceeds south-east for 30 km to end at a junction with the R719 in the town of Wesselsbron (north of the town centre).
