= Sophie Maine =

South African politician (1948–2020)

Member of the National Assembly
- In office May 1994 – May 2009
- Constituency: North West

Personal details
- Born: 15 January 1948
- Died: 18 August 2020 (aged 72)
- Citizenship: South Africa
- Party: African National Congress

Makatse Sophia Maine (15 January 1948 – 18 August 2020) was a South African politician from the North West. She represented the African National Congress (ANC) in the National Assembly from 1994 to 2009 and was a former chairperson of the ANC Women's League in the Western Transvaal.

== Early life and activism ==
Maine was born on 15 January 1948. She rose to prominence through the ANC Women's League in present-day North West Province and served as inaugural chairperson of the league's branch in Ipelegeng in Schweizer-Reneke after the league was relaunched in 1990. She was later elected as regional chairperson of the league in the broader Western Transvaal.

== Legislative career: 1994–2009 ==
In South Africa's first post-apartheid elections in 1994, Maine was elected to represent the ANC in the National Assembly, the lower house of the new South African Parliament. She served three terms, gaining re-election in 1999 and 2004, and served the North West constituency. During her third term, she was appointed as the ANC's whip in the Portfolio Committee on Water Affairs and Forestry.

=== Travelgate conviction ===
In August 2004, the Scorpions named Maine as one of several politicians who was under investigation in connection with the Travelgate scandal, which involved the widespread abuse of parliamentary air-travel vouchers. During related liquidation inquiries, it had been alleged that Maine had made unauthorised claims for car hire and hotel stays worth over R200,000; she said that the travel agency had told her that she was allowed to claim the benefits from Parliament. She faced criminal charges and in October 2006 accepted a plea deal, in terms of which she pled guilty to a single count of fraud in relation to R206,000 in service benefits. She was sentenced to pay a fine of R100,000, in lieu of serving five years' imprisonment, and was additionally handed a mandatory five-year prison sentence suspended conditionally for five years.

Maine and other convicted politicians received a formal reprimand during a parliamentary sitting in March 2007. In August 2007, the ANC announced that she had been demoted from her position as a committee whip. She left Parliament after the next general election in 2009.

== Death ==
Maine died on 18 August 2020 after a short illness. The provincial government of the North West granted her a special provincial official funeral.
