= R507 (South Africa) =

Regional Route in South Africa

Regional route R507

Route information
- Length: 186 km (116 mi)

Major junctions
- West end: N18 in Setlagole
- N14 in Delareyville; R506 near Delareyville; R505 in Ottosdal; R503 in Hartbeesfontein
- East end: R30 near Klerksdorp

Location
- Country: South Africa

Highway system
- Numbered routes of South Africa
← R506	→ R508

The R507 is a Regional Route in North West, South Africa that connects Setlagole with Hartbeesfontein via Delareyville and Ottosdal.

== Route ==
Its north-western end is in the village of Setlagole where it originates from an intersection with the N18. It heads south-east for 58 kilometres to reach Delareyville where it crosses the N14 at a staggered junction in the town centre. From Delareyville, it heads south-east to meet the northern terminus of the R506 and cross the Harts River before heading eastwards for 60 kilometres to reach Ottosdal, where it passes through as Voortrekker Street and intersects with the R505 (Swart Street). The R507 continues eastwards for 43 kilometres to reach the town of Hartbeesfontein, where it turns northwards as Eenheid Street into the town centre and reaches a junction with the R503 before continuing eastwards. It continues east-north-east to reach its end at a T-junction with the R30 between Klerksdorp and Ventersdorp.
