= Kleynhans =

Kleynhans is a surname. Notable people with the surname include:

- Ebert Kleynhans (fl. 1996), South African paralympic swimmer
- Erns Kleynhans (fl. 2015), South African politician
