= Boskuil =

- Location within North West (South African province) Location within South Africa
- Coordinates: 27°24′37″S 25°52′35″E
- Country: South Africa
- Province: North West
- District: Dr Kenneth Kaunda
- Municipality: Maquassi Hills

Area
  - Total: 1.33 km^{2} (0.51 sq mi)

Population (2011)
  - Total: 1,200
  - Density: 900/km^{2} (2,300/sq mi)

Racial makeup (2011)
  - Black African: 99.0%
  - Coloured: 0.7%
  - Indian/Asian: 0.2%

First languages (2011)
  - Tswana: 73.5%
  - Sotho: 12.1%
  - Xhosa: 7.2%
  - English: 2.4%
  - Other: 4.8%
- Time zone: UTC+2 (SAST)
- Area code: 018

Boskuil is a small village in North West Province of South Africa.
