= Mamusa Local Municipality elections =

Local elections in the North West Province, South Africa

The Mamusa Local Municipality council consists of sixteen members elected by mixed-member proportional representation. Eight councillors are elected by first-past-the-post voting in eight wards, while the remaining eight are chosen from party lists so that the total number of party representatives is proportional to the number of votes received.

In the election of 4 November 2026 the African National Congress (ANC) lost its majority, but remains the largest party on seven seats.

== Results ==
The following table shows the composition of the council after past elections.

Event	ANC	DA	EFF	FF+	Other	Total
2000 election	9	1	—	—	2	12
2006 election	9	1	—	1	1	12
2011 election	12	2	—	0	1	15
2016 election	11	1	2	1	3	18
2021 election	9	1	4	1	1	16
2026 election	7	1	3	1	4	16

== December 2000 election ==
The following table shows the results of the 2000 election.

Party	Ward			List			Total seats
Party	Votes	%	Seats	Votes	%	Seats	Total seats
African National Congress	5,614	65.50	5	6,801	74.20	4	9
Pan Africanist Congress of Azania	1,422	16.59	0	1,236	13.48	2	2
Democratic Alliance	475	5.54	1	617	6.73	0	1
Noordwes Forum	437	5.10	0	512	5.59	0	0
Independent candidates	623	7.27	0				0
Total	8,571	100.00	6	9,166	100.00	6	12
Valid votes	8,571	90.12		9,166	96.38		
Invalid/blank votes	940	9.88		344	3.62		
Total votes	9,511	100.00		9,510	100.00		
Registered voters/turnout	18,188	52.29		18,188	52.29		

== March 2006 election ==
The following table shows the results of the 2006 election.

Party	Ward			List			Total seats
Party	Votes	%	Seats	Votes	%	Seats	Total seats
African National Congress	7,037	68.63	5	7,622	80.09	4	9
Independent candidates	1,458	14.22	1				1
Democratic Alliance				1,092	11.47	1	1
Freedom Front Plus	624	6.09	0	305	3.20	1	1
Pan Africanist Congress of Azania	786	7.67	0				0
Independent Democrats	186	1.81	0	269	2.83	0	0
African Christian Democratic Party	163	1.59	0	229	2.41	0	0
Total	10,254	100.00	6	9,517	100.00	6	12
Valid votes	10,254	93.83		9,517	87.06		
Invalid/blank votes	674	6.17		1,415	12.94		
Total votes	10,928	100.00		10,932	100.00		
Registered voters/turnout	22,998	47.52		22,998	47.53		

== May 2011 election ==
The following table shows the results of the 2011 election.

Party	Ward			List			Total seats
Party	Votes	%	Seats	Votes	%	Seats	Total seats
African National Congress	10,852	76.69	7	11,224	80.15	5	12
Democratic Alliance	1,510	10.67	1	1,502	10.73	1	2
Congress of the People	507	3.58	0	570	4.07	1	1
Pan Africanist Congress of Azania	367	2.59	0	301	2.15	0	0
Independent candidates	480	3.39	0				0
Freedom Front Plus	203	1.43	0	177	1.26	0	0
Independent Civic Organisation of South Africa	175	1.24	0	152	1.09	0	0
African Christian Democratic Party	57	0.40	0	77	0.55	0	0
Total	14,151	100.00	8	14,003	100.00	7	15
Valid votes	14,151	96.55		14,003	95.67		
Invalid/blank votes	505	3.45		634	4.33		
Total votes	14,656	100.00		14,637	100.00		
Registered voters/turnout	25,134	58.31		25,134	58.24		

== August 2016 election ==
The following table shows the results of the 2016 election.

Party	Ward			List			Total seats
Party	Votes	%	Seats	Votes	%	Seats	Total seats
African National Congress	9,727	59.25	8	9,553	58.35	3	11
Forum for Service Delivery	2,599	15.83	0	2,668	16.30	3	3
Economic Freedom Fighters	2,185	13.31	0	2,164	13.22	2	2
Democratic Alliance	988	6.02	1	1,000	6.11	0	1
Freedom Front Plus	573	3.49	0	553	3.38	1	1
Congress of the People	276	1.68	0	306	1.87	0	0
African People's Convention	68	0.41	0	127	0.78	0	0
Total	16,416	100.00	9	16,371	100.00	9	18
Valid votes	16,416	97.93		16,371	97.87		
Invalid/blank votes	347	2.07		356	2.13		
Total votes	16,763	100.00		16,727	100.00		
Registered voters/turnout	28,290	59.25		28,290	59.13		

== November 2021 election ==
The following table shows the results of the 2021 election.

Party	Ward			List			Total seats
Party	Votes	%	Seats	Votes	%	Seats	Total seats
African National Congress	7,651	54.47	7	7,725	56.51	2	9
Economic Freedom Fighters	3,414	24.31	0	3,501	25.61	4	4
Freedom Front Plus	890	6.34	1	912	6.67	0	1
Azanian Independent Community Movement	804	5.72	0	823	6.02	1	1
Democratic Alliance	396	2.82	0	375	2.74	1	1
Independent candidates	656	4.67	0				0
African Independent Congress	98	0.70	0	128	0.94	0	0
Congress of the People	30	0.21	0	85	0.62	0	0
African Transformation Movement	34	0.24	0	57	0.42	0	0
Forum for Service Delivery	38	0.27	0	38	0.28	0	0
African Christian Democratic Party	34	0.24	0	27	0.20	0	0
Total	14,045	100.00	8	13,671	100.00	8	16
Valid votes	14,045	96.25		13,671	93.91		
Invalid/blank votes	547	3.75		887	6.09		
Total votes	14,592	100.00		14,558	100.00		
Registered voters/turnout	28,107	51.92		28,107	51.79		

== November 2026 election ==
The following table shows the results of the 2026 election.

Party	Ward			List			Total seats
Party	Votes	%	Seats	Votes	%	Seats	Total seats
African National Congress	7,203	43.80	7	7,294	45.54	0	7
Economic Freedom Fighters	2,573	15.65	0	2,610	16.30	3	3
South African Communist Party	1,542	9.38	0	1,530	9.55	1	1
Freedom Front Plus	1,355	8.24	1	1,315	8.21	0	1
ActionSA	780	4.74	0	768	4.80	1	1
Afrika Mayibuye Movement	617	3.75	0	607	3.79	1	1
Democratic Alliance	575	3.50	0	580	3.62	1	1
uMkhonto weSizwe Party	558	3.39	0	554	3.46	1	1
Patriotic Alliance	407	2.47	0	400	2.50	0	0
Independent candidates	587	3.57	0				0
United Africans Transformation	166	1.01	0	220	1.37	0	0
Tsogang Civic Movement	39	0.24	0	60	0.37	0	0
Azanian Independent Community Movement	18	0.11	0	52	0.32	0	0
South African Political Association	26	0.16	0	26	0.16	0	0
Total	16,446	100.00	8	16,016	100.00	8	16
Valid votes	16,446	96.34		16,016	94.31		
Invalid/blank votes	624	3.66		967	5.69		
Total votes	17,070	100.00		16,983	100.00		
Registered voters/turnout	33,578	50.84		33,578	50.58		
