= Kgakala =

- Location within North West (South African province) Location within South Africa
- Coordinates: 27°14′S 26°14′E
- Country: South Africa
- Province: North West
- District: Dr Kenneth Kaunda
- Municipality: Maquassi Hills

Area
  - Total: 2.05 km^{2} (0.79 sq mi)

Population (2011)
  - Total: 8,336
  - Density: 4,070/km^{2} (10,500/sq mi)

Racial makeup (2011)
  - Black African: 98.9%
  - Coloured: 0.4%
  - Indian/Asian: 0.2%
  - Other: 0.4%

First languages (2011)
  - Tswana: 68.0%
  - Sotho: 14.3%
  - Xhosa: 10.4%
  - Zulu: 2.0%
  - Other: 5.2%
- Time zone: UTC+2 (SAST)
- Postal code (street): 2640
- PO box: 2640
- Area code: 018

Kgakala is a black township of Leeudoringstad in North West Province of South Africa.
