= Sepharane =

- Village
- Location within South Africa
- Coordinates: 23.9220878°S 28.4907377°E
- Country: South Africa

Sepharane is a small village in Limpopo province, South Africa. It's located to the east of National Road R503, near Witvinger Nature Reserve. Its surrounded by Bakenburg, a nearby town.

Sepharane is home to the Northern Sotho speaking people, which migrated to this area around the early 1800's from the Boer Farms in the Waterberg region.

With mountains surround the village, it houses Gwangwa High School which was founded to bridge the distance for local school children who used to travel by foot to neighbouring high schools.

== See also ==
- Economy of South Africa
- History of South Africa
