= R502 road =

R502 road may refer to:

- R502 road (Ireland)
- R502 road (South Africa)
- R502 refrigerant
