= R506 road =

R506 road may refer to:

- R506 road (Ireland)
- R506 road (South Africa)
