= Doringkruin =

- Location within North West (South African province) Location within South Africa
- Coordinates: 26.8162°S 26.6920°E
- Country: South Africa
- Province: North West
- District: Dr Kenneth Kaunda
- Municipality: City of Matlosana

Area
  - Total: 2.20 km^{2} (0.85 sq mi)

Population (2011)
  - Total: 3,417
  - Density: 1,550/km^{2} (4,020/sq mi)

Racial makeup (2011)
  - Black African: 22.1%
  - Coloured: 0.8%
  - Indian/Asian: 0.7%
  - White: 76.1%
  - Other: 0.3%

First languages (2011)
  - Afrikaans: 73.2%
  - English: 8.9%
  - Tswana: 7.4%
  - Sotho: 4.7%
  - Other: 5.8%
- Time zone: UTC+2 (SAST)
- Postal code (street): 2571
- PO box: 2576

Doringkruin is a predominantly White residential suburb 5 km north east of Klerksdorp in the North West province of South Africa.
