= Dominion mine =

Uranium mine in South Africa

- Location: Dominionville, North West, South Africa
- Products: uranium
- Company: Shiva Uranium

The Dominion mine is a large mine located in the northern part of South Africa in Dominionville. Dominion represents one of the largest uranium reserves in South Africa having estimated reserves of 113.1 million tonnes of ore grading 0.037% uranium.
