= Hartebeestfontein Mine =

Uranium mine in South Africa

- Location within South Africa
- Location: City of Matlosana, North West, South Africa; 26°49′47.64″S 26°49′35.04″E
- Products: uranium

The Hartebeestfontein Mine is a large mine located near Klerksdorp in the North West Province of South Africa. Hartebeestfontein represents one of the largest uranium reserves in South Africa having estimated reserves of 641 million tonnes of ore grading 0.007% uranium.
