= Hartbeesfontein =

- Lethabong
- Location within North West (South African province) Location within South Africa
- Coordinates: 26°45′44″S 26°25′14″E
- Country: South Africa
- Province: North West
- District: Dr Kenneth Kaunda
- Municipality: City of Matlosana

Area
  - Total: 6.37 km^{2} (2.46 sq mi)

Population (2011)
  - Total: 1,467
  - Density: 230/km^{2} (596/sq mi)

Racial makeup (2011)
  - White: 74.8%
  - Black African: 23.3%
  - Coloured: 0.4%
  - Indian/Asian: 0.9%
  - Other: 0.6%

First languages (2011)
  - Afrikaans: 81.0%
  - Tswana: 11.9%
  - English: 3.6%
  - Sotho: 1.6%
  - Other: 1.9%
- Time zone: UTC+2 (SAST)
- Postal code (street): 2600
- PO box: 2600
- Area code: 018

Hartbeesfontein, officially Lethabong, is a settlement near Klerksdorp, in the North West province of South Africa. It is situated at the intersection of the R503 and R507 routes.

== Geology ==
The town is situated on an ancient geological feature known as the Hartbeesfontein basin (or KOSH basin), which is the source of the gold found on its southern rim. Underground water occurs in abundance in dolomitic aquifers of the region. When the water is however allowed to seep into mines it is oxidised and polluted by the exposed iron pyrites. As of 2005 when Buffelsfontein mine went out of business, it became a burden on the remaining mines to keep the interconnected tunnels free of water.

== History ==
A small pass above town, Hartebeesfontein Poort, was the scene of a Boer War skirmish on February 17, 1901. The British forces, a contingent of Lord Methuen led by Captain Poison, were descending the 500 ft escarpment above town, when they were confronted by entrenched Boer forces of about double their number. From dawn to 10 o'clock the forces were deadlocked, when Lord Methuen ordered two companies of Major Murray's convoy guard to occupy a strategic position. After some dozens of soldiers were killed on each side, the British secured the pass and captured ample Boer supplies of stock and grain.
