= Wolmaransstad Commando =

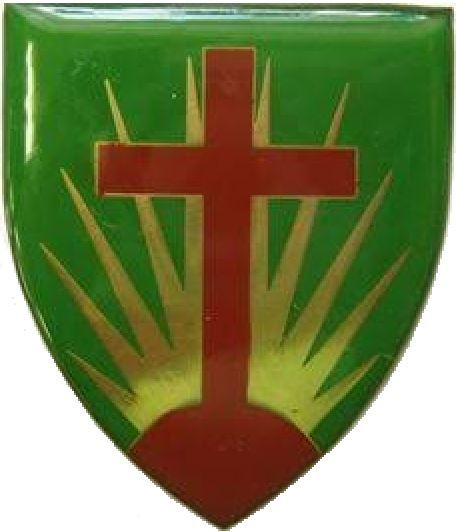
- Wolmaransstad Commando emblem
- Country: South Africa
- Allegiance: (South African Republic) Zuid Afrikaanse Republiek; Union of South Africa; Republic of South Africa; Republic of South Africa
- Branch: South African Army; South African Army
- Type: Infantry
- Role: Light Infantry
- Size: One Battalion
- Part of: South African Infantry Corps; Army Territorial Reserve, Group 30
- Garrison/HQ: Wolmaransstad

Wolmaransstad Commando was a light infantry regiment of the South African Army. It formed part of the South African Army Infantry Formation as well as the South African Territorial Reserve.

== History ==
=== Operations ===
==== With the Zuid Afrikaanse Republiek ====
===== Anglo Boer War =====
Elements of this commando was engaged at the Battle of Magersfontein on 11 December 1899.

==== With the UDF ====
By 1902 all Commando remnants were under British military control and disarmed.

By 1912, however previous Commando members could join shooting associations.

By 1940, such commandos were under control of the National Reserve of Volunteers.

These commandos were formally reactivated by 1948.

==== With the SADF ====
During this era, the unit was mainly used for area force protection, search and cordones as well as stock theft control assistance to the rural police.

The unit fell under the command of Group 30.

==== With the SANDF ====
===== Disbandment =====
This unit, along with all other Commando units was disbanded after a decision by South African President Thabo Mbeki to disband all Commando Units. The Commando system was phased out between 2003 and 2008 "because of the role it played in the apartheid era", according to the Minister of Safety and Security Charles Nqakula.

== Unit Insignia ==
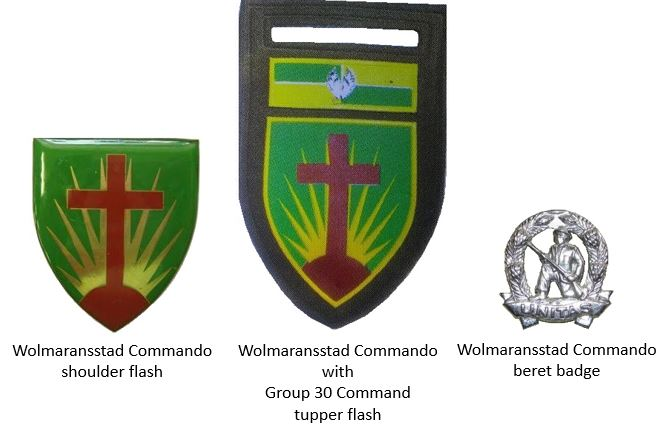
SADF era Wolmaransstad Commando insignia

== Leadership ==
Leadership
From	Honorary Colonels	To	Ribbon
	No known incumbents		
From	Commanding Officer	To	Ribbon
1997	Cmdt Frans Marx	c. nd	
From	Regimental Sergeant Major	To	Ribbon
	No known incumbents		

== See also ==
- South African Commando System
