= Dominionville =

- Location within North West (South African province) Location within South Africa
- Coordinates: 26.900°S 26.394°E
- Country: South Africa
- Province: North West
- District: Dr Kenneth Kaunda
- Municipality: City of Matlosana

Area
  - Total: 1.70 km^{2} (0.66 sq mi)

Population (2011)
  - Total: 676
  - Density: 398/km^{2} (1,030/sq mi)

Racial makeup (2011)
  - Black African: 57.1%
  - Coloured: 2.4%
  - Indian/Asian: 0.1%
  - White: 39.6%
  - Other: 0.7%

First languages (2011)
  - Tswana: 46.4%
  - Afrikaans: 43.0%
  - English: 5.2%
  - Xhosa: 2.4%
  - Other: 3.0%
- Time zone: UTC+2 (SAST)
- PO box: 2578
- Area code: 018

Dominionville is a town in Dr Kenneth Kaunda District Municipality in the North West province of South Africa. Dominionville is named after the mining of the rock called Domino.

Described as a "ramshackle mining village" by The Globe and Mail, it was built around the Dominion Reefs uranium deposit. The site was acquired in 2005 by Uranium One and at its peak it provided employment for 4,500 workers, but poor labour relations and falling uranium prices led to the mine's closure in October 2009. Shiva Uranium, controlled by the Gupta family, bought the mine for $37 million in 2010.
