= Erns Kleynhans =

South African politician

Erns Kleynhans MPL

Member of the North West Provincial Legislature
- Incumbent
- Assumed office 22 May 2019

Personal details
- Born: Erns Lodewukis Kleynhans
- Occupation: Member of the Provincial Legislature
- Profession: Politician

Erns Kleynhans is a South African politician currently serving as a Member of the North West Provincial Legislature for the Freedom Front Plus. Kleynhans served as a councillor of the Matlosana Local Municipality from 2016 to 2019.

== Political career ==
Kleynhans has been involved with the Freedom Front Plus since 2015. He is currently a member of the strategy committee of the party's federal council.

Kleynhans was elected as a proportional representation councillor of the Matlosana Local Municipality in August 2016. During his tenure on the council, he was a member of the committees on infrastructure and economic growth.

Following the 2019 general election, Kleynhans was selected to represent the FF Plus in the North West Provincial Legislature.
