= Ipelegeng =

Ipelegeng Location
- Interactive map of Ipelegeng Location
- Coordinates: 27.2016°S 25.2972°E
- Country: South Africa
- Province: North West
- Municipality: Mamusa

Population
  - Total: 32,090
- Time zone: GMT +2
- Area code: 2780

Ipelegeng is a township west of Schweizer-Reneke in the Mamusa Local Municipality, in the North West Province of South Africa. The total population of the township is about 32,090 people. About 90% of the people in the area are Tswana people. It is located 5 km west of Schweizer-Reneke and 30 km east of Amalia, along the R504.

== Details ==
Ipelegeng has been divided into sections:

- Slovo sections
- Extension 4
- Extension 5
- Extension 6
- Extension 8
- Extension 9
- Number 2
- Kathrada
- Charon
- 600
- Makhala
- Extension 7
- Crossroads
- 3 Rooms
- New Stance
- New Town
- Indian Centre
- Loans

The oldest block in the township is number 2 or 2 kasi. Ipelegeng has three high schools, those being: Ipelegeng Secondary school, Itshupeng Secondary School, and Reabetswe Secondary School. As well as five primary schools: Kolong Primary, Mamusa Primary, Tshwaraganelo Primary, Charon Primary, and Kgatontle Primary. Ipelegeng is known as a quiet township in between Amalia and Schweizer-Reneke.

== Education ==
The township has Public Secondary Schools:

- Ipelegeng High School
- Itshupeng Secondary School
- Reabetswe Secondary School

It also has Public primary schools:

- Kolong Primary School
- Ikgomotseng Primary School
- Kgatontle Primary School
- Tshwaraganelo Primary School
- Mamusa Primary School
- Charon Primary School
- Roshunville Primary School

Additional Schools

- Hoërskool Schweizer-Reneke
- Laerskool Schweizer-Reneke
