= Glaudina =

- Location within North West (South African province) Location within South Africa
- Coordinates: 27.040°S 25.627°E
- Country: South Africa
- Province: North West
- District: Dr Ruth Segomotsi Mompati
- Municipality: Mamusa

Area
  - Total: 1.52 km^{2} (0.59 sq mi)

Population (2011)
  - Total: 2,368
  - Density: 1,560/km^{2} (4,030/sq mi)

Racial makeup (2011)
  - Black African: 93.3%
  - Coloured: 2.9%
  - Indian/Asian: 0.8%
  - White: 2.6%
  - Other: 0.4%

First languages (2011)
  - Tswana: 88.0%
  - Afrikaans: 3.2%
  - Sotho: 2.7%
  - English: 2.3%
  - Other: 3.8%
- Time zone: UTC+2 (SAST)

Glaudina is a town in Dr Ruth Segomotsi Mompati District Municipality in the North West province of South Africa.
