= R506 (South Africa) =

Regional route in South Africa

Regional route R506

Route information
- Length: 146 km (91 mi)

Major junctions
- North-east end: R507 near Delareyville
- R34 / R504 in Schweizer-Reneke
- South-west end: R708 near Christiana

Location
- Country: South Africa

Highway system
- Numbered routes of South Africa
← R505	→ R507

The R506 is a Regional Route in South Africa.

== Route ==
It runs north-east south-west. The northern end takes origin from the R507 just south-east of Delareyville, North West. The first town it passes through is Migdol. From there it reaches Schweizer-Reneke. It becomes co-signed with the R34 and while so designated crosses the R504 and the Harts River. South of the town, the R506 splits and exits the town south-south-west and continues to Christiana, where it ends at a t-junction with the R708 just east of the neighbourhoods of Geluksoord and Utlwanang.
