= Dutch Reformed Church, Wolmaransstad =

Church in Wolmaransstad, South Africa

Dutch Reformed Church
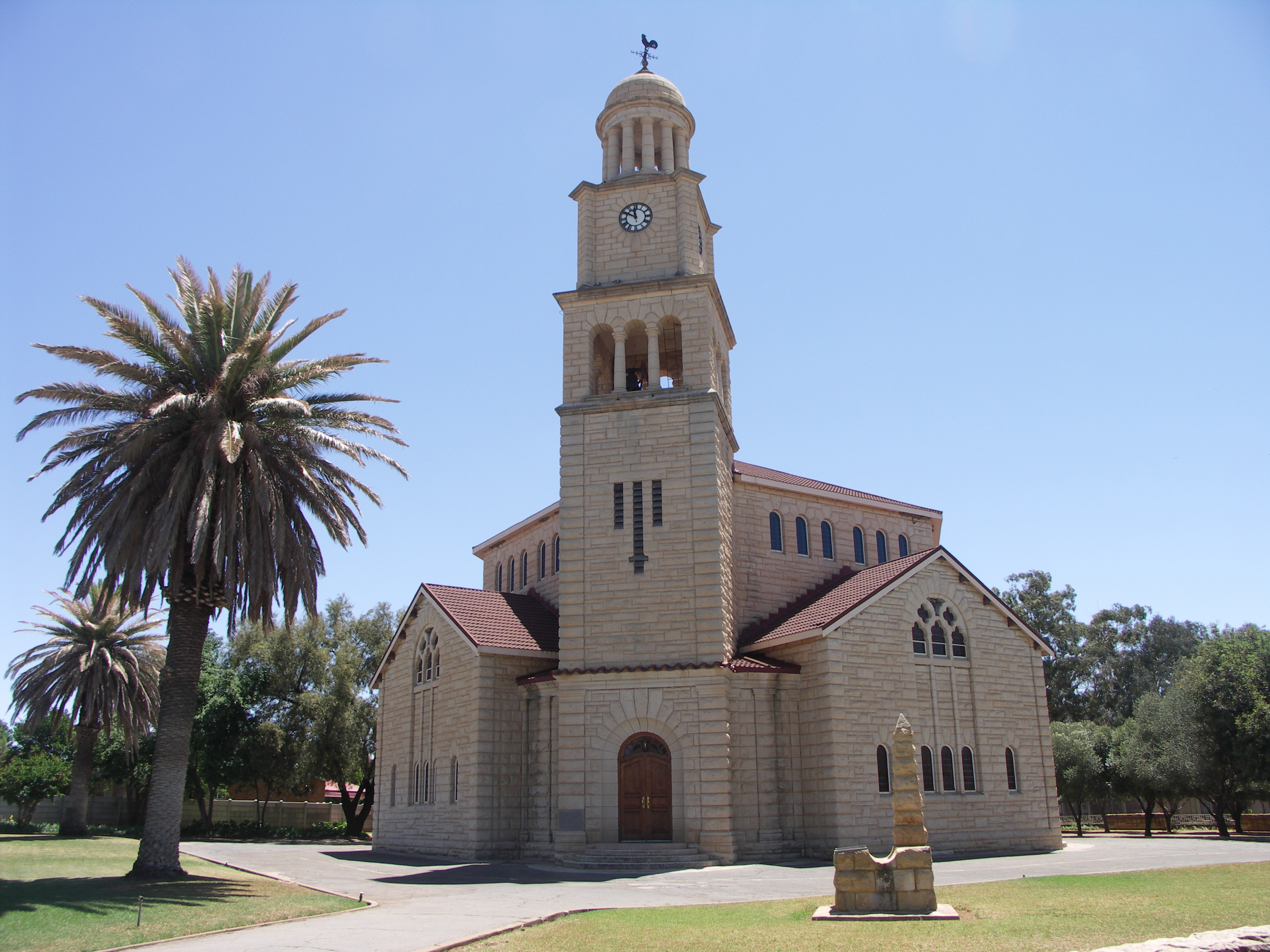
- Dutch Reformed Church
- 27°11′58″S 25°58′54″E
- Location: Wolmaransstad
- Country: South Africa
- Denomination: Nederduits Gereformeerde Kerk

History
- Founded: 1888

Architecture
- Functional status: Church

The Dutch Reformed Church in Wolmaransstad was founded on 4 February 1888 as the 18th congregation in the then Transvaal Church. It is located in the town of the same name in the province of North West and falls under the Goudland Synod. The church was designed by Gerard Moerdijk.

The earliest mission in the Transvaal was probably undertaken near the present town of Wolmaransstad, because in 1823 the missionary Rev. Broadbent of the Wesleyan Church began missionary work here. He was later assisted by Rev. Hodgson. The place where their houses stood could still be indicated a century later. The little fountain that Broadbent mentioned in his diary was still there and was called the Sendelingsfonteintjie.

== Ministers ==
- C.J. Snyman, April 1891 – October 1893
- Paul Nel, 30 Jun. 1894 – 1897
- M.P.A. Coetsee jr., 21 Apr. 1898 – 18 Nov. 1901 (deceased)
- E.J.J. van der Horst, 1903 – 1925
- Piet van der Hoven, 1926 – 1939
- C.W.J. Pistorius, 1939 – 1946
- J.S. Hattingh, 1946 –1951
- J.A. Claassens, 1952 – 1957
- P.L. Erasmus, 1958 – 1962
- C.A. van Wyk, 1963 – ?
