= Matlosana Mall =

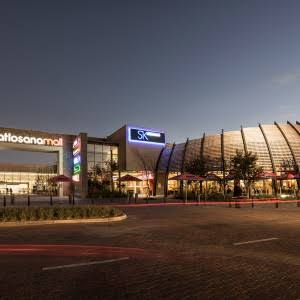
- Matlosana Mall at night

General information
- Type: Regional mall
- Location: 151 Joe Slovo Road, Klerksdorp, South Africa
- Opening: 23 October 2014; 11 years ago
- Cost: R1 billion
- Owner: Redefine Properties

Technical details
- Floor area: 65,000 m^{2} (700,000 sq ft)

Design and construction
- Architecture firm: SVA International
- Developer: Abacus Development Company

Other information
- Number of stores: 145
- Number of anchors: 8
- Parking: 2,842 parking bays; 1,000 basement parking bays

Website
- matlosanamall.co/home/

Matlosana Mall is a shopping centre in Klerksdorp, North West Province, South Africa.

== Development ==
The mall is located at the eastern entrance to the city, and caters for neighbouring nodes as well. With easy access from surrounding towns, it is positioned as the catalyst of the N12 development corridor. This growth node stretches between Klerksdorp and Stilfontein and is earmarked as an economic growth area in the region.

== Tenants ==
The mall's mix of 145 stores is led by anchor retailers Checkers, Pick n Pay, Woolworths, Edgars, Foschini, Sportsman's Warehouse and Incredible Connection.

The mall hosts major banks, including FNB, Nedbank, Standard Bank, Absa, Capitec Bank, as well as key cellular stores like, MTN, Cell C, Telkom and Vodacom.

The mall also hosts over 14 fast food and restaurant options, like KFC, Spur and Wimpy.

Cinema chain Ster Kinekor has announced that its cinema in the mall will be closed down, with the chain serving staff with a section 189(3) notice (Labour Relations Act) in February 2024, beginning the retrenchment process of 236 of its 728 employees.

== Growpoint objection ==
The largest property investment holding company listed on the JSE‚ Growthpoint Properties‚ which owns the town's 20‚000m² City Mall in the central business district‚ has objected to the North West Townships Board over the municipality allowing a new development on the outskirts of town - the R1bn Matlosana Mall having been built by Stellenbosch-based Abacus Asset Management.

Plans for the 60‚000m² mall - situated at the eastern entrance to the town along the N12 - have been met with opposition from other developers ever since first being mooted in 2007.

Growthpoint's appeal to the townships board is a last-ditch attempt to halt the Matlosana Mall after fellow Klerksdorp development‚ Flamwood Walk - through owners Diggers Development - had its appeal over the development to the Supreme Court of Appeal (SCA) dismissed with costs in November last 2011.
