= Witpoort, North West =

Witpoort
- Location within North West (South African province) Location within South Africa
- Coordinates: 27.174°S 26.129°E
- Country: South Africa
- Province: North West
- District: Dr Kenneth Kaunda
- Municipality: Maquassi Hills

Area
  - Total: 26.52 km^{2} (10.24 sq mi)

Population (2011)
  - Total: 259
  - Density: 9.77/km^{2} (25.3/sq mi)

Racial makeup (2011)
  - Black African: 3.5%
  - Coloured: 1.9%
  - White: 94.6%

First languages (2011)
  - Afrikaans: 93.4%
  - Tswana: 4.6%
  - English: 1.5%
  - Other: 0.4%
- Time zone: UTC+2 (SAST)
- PO box: 2632

Witpoort is a town in Dr Kenneth Kaunda District Municipality in the North West province of South Africa.
