= Klerksdorp =

Klerksdorp City of Matlosana
- City
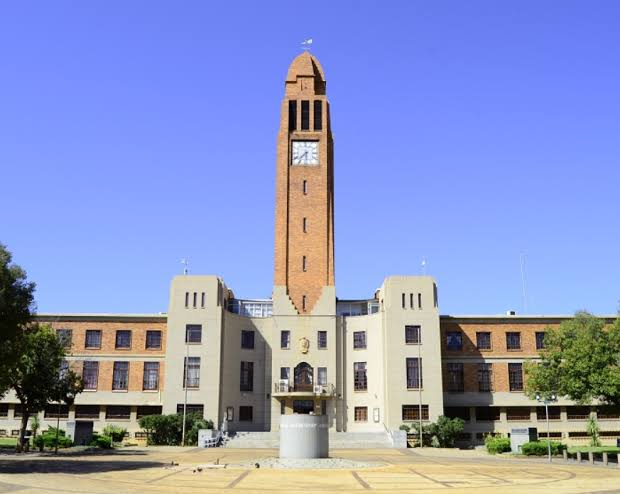
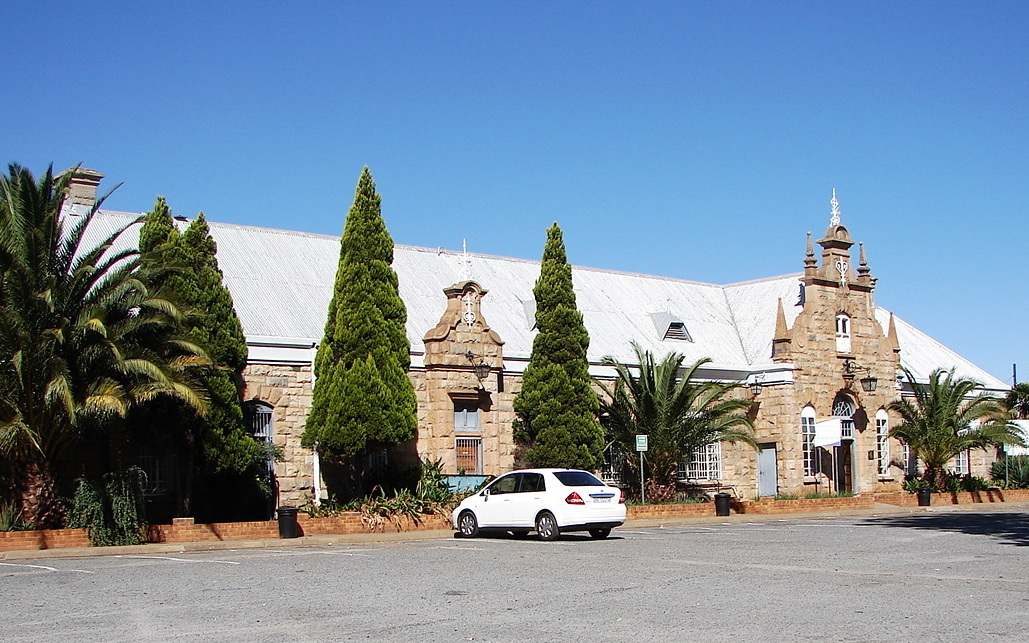
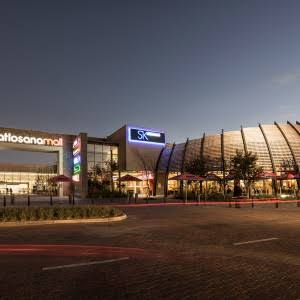
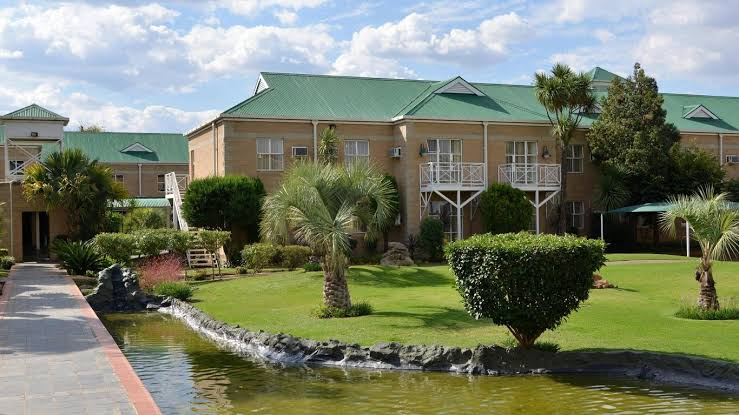
- Cityscape of Klerksdorp

- Location within North West (South African province) Location within South Africa Location within Africa
- Coordinates: 26°52′S 26°40′E
- Country: South Africa
- Province: North West
- District: Dr Kenneth Kaunda
- Municipality: City of Matlosana

Area
  - Total: 105.98 km^{2} (40.92 sq mi)

Population (2011)
  - Total: 186,515
  - Density: 1,759.9/km^{2} (4,558.1/sq mi)

Racial makeup (2011)
  - Black African: 74.0%
  - Coloured: 6.4%
  - Indian/Asian: 1.3%
  - White: 18.0%
  - Other: 0.3%

First languages (2011)
  - Tswana: 42.7%
  - Afrikaans: 23.8%
  - Xhosa: 11.7%
  - Sotho: 10.7%
  - Other: 11.2%
- Time zone: UTC+2 (SAST)
- Postal code (street): 2571
- PO box: 2570
- Area code: 018
- Website: www.klerksdorp.co.za

Klerksdorp (/ˈklɑːrksdɔːrp/ KLARKS-dorp) is located in the North West Province, South Africa. Klerksdorp is located 165 km (103 mi) southeast of Mahikeng, the provincial capital. Klerksdorp was also the first capital of the then Transvaal Republic and used to be the home of the first Stock Exchange in the region. It became an important trading town linking Kimberley to Johannesburg. It became home to a mix of farmers, miners and immigrants servicing the two industries. It was then located there because of availability of water and climate change.

== History ==
=== Beginnings (1837/38 and on) ===
The city was founded in 1837 or 1838 when the Voortrekkers settled on the banks of the Schoonspruit ("Clear stream"), which flows through the town. Klerksdorp is the oldest European settlement north of the Vaal River, and thus of the former Zuid-Afrikaansche Republiek (Z.A.R), also known as the Transvaal Republic.

The most prominent of the first settlers was Hendrik Grobler who claimed a farm of about 160 km^{2} (62 sq mi), called it Elandsheuwel ("Hill of the Eland"). He gave plots of land and communal grazing rights on this farm to other Voortrekkers in return for their labour in building a dam and an irrigation canal. This collection of smallholdings was later given the name of Klerksdorp in honour of the first landdrost (magistrate) of the area, Jacob de Clercq.

=== City status ===
Although Klerksdorp was officially proclaimed a town only in 1888, long before that it was considered a town not only by its residents, but also by visitors and even by authorities.

In 1850 the Rev. A. Murray mentioned the "town on the Schoonspruit" during his trip through the Transvaal. In the same year, an official document, an inspection report, spoke of the "town of Klerksdorp" when the residents requested additional pieces of land.

Seven years later, in 1857, state attorney J. H. Visagie wrote to government secretary C. Moll that it was desirable that regulations be drawn up for Klerksdorp. President M. W. Pretorius then issued regulations for Klerksdorp and Skoonspruit in 1859.

In a letter to the President, magistrate Cornelis Johannes Bodenstein of Potchefstroom in 1863 also designated Klerksdorp as a town.

The Executive Council had a sketch map of the town drawn up in 1871 and according to article 196 of the minutes dated 18 January 1872 the town regulations were approved.

=== Gold rush of 1885 ===
In November 1885 gold was discovered in the Klerksdorp district by M. G. Jansen van Vuuren as well as on the Witwatersrand, which lies about 160 km (99 mi) to the east. As a consequence, thousands of fortune-seekers descended on the small village, turning it into a town with 70 taverns and even a stock exchange of its own. This stock exchange opened its doors in 1888 and soon did a roaring trade, selling as much as the equivalent of R20,000 in one day.

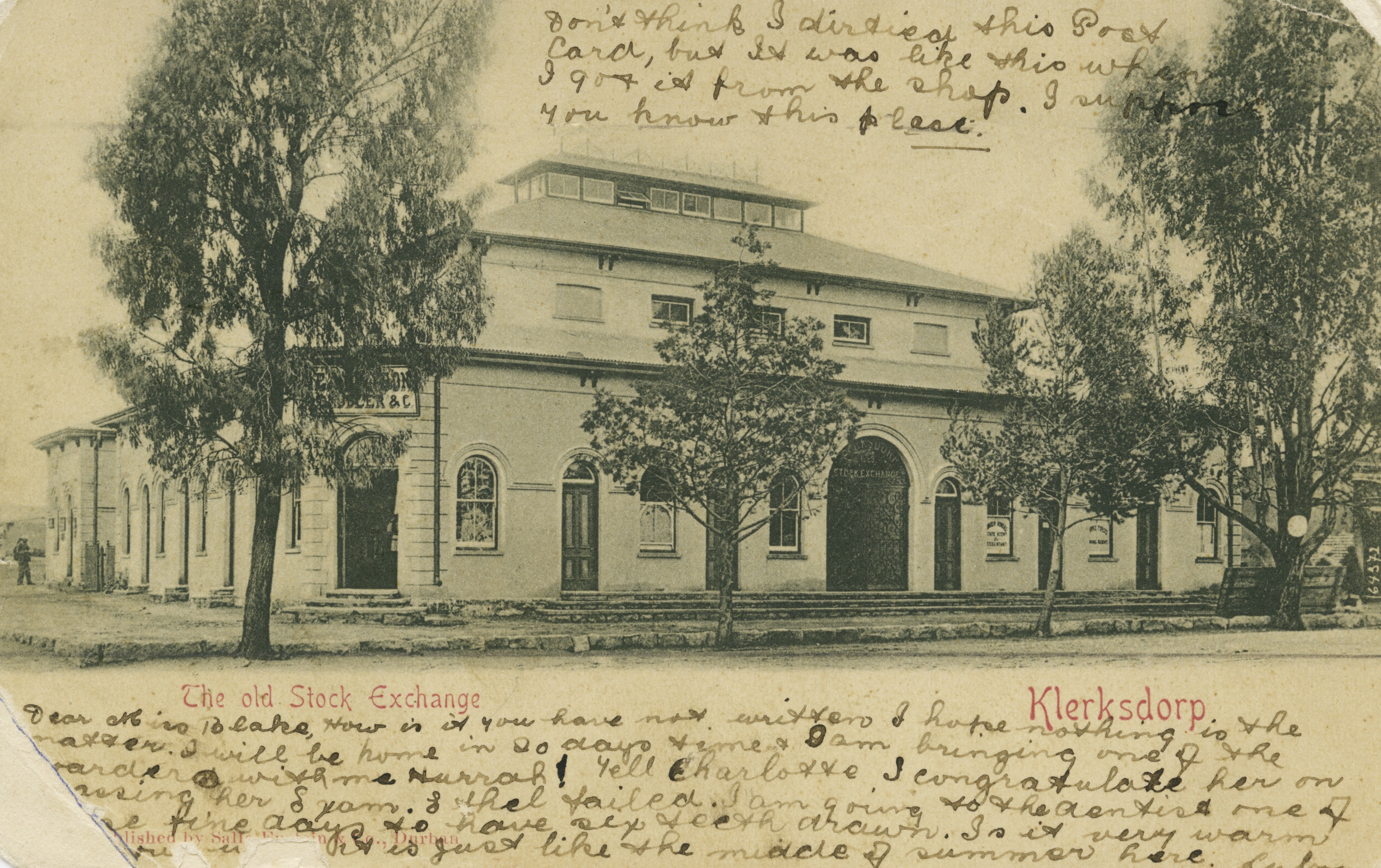
Old Klerksdorp Stock Exchange

However, the nature of the gold reef demanded expensive and sophisticated equipment to mine and extract the gold, causing the majority of diggers to move away in the late 1890s and leading to a decline in the gold mining industry. This also led to an early demise for the Stock Exchange that stood empty for many years, were converted to a cinema in 1912 and finally being demolished in 1958. The amalgamation process used to extract the gold from the crushed ore was relatively inefficient and largely contributed to decline. By 1893 the new MacArthur–Forrest process used for gold extraction brought a short-lived revival in the Klerksdorp gold mining industry, but uncertainty created by the Jameson Raid of December 1895 as well as transport problems created by the rinderpest of 1896 soon led to a near collapse of the industry.

=== Second Boer War (1899–1902) ===
During the Second Boer War (1899–1902), heavy fighting occurred in the area, which also housed two large concentration camps, one for Whites (centred on modern day Klerksdorp High School) and a separate one for Africans (situated in the area that is today the Ellaton and Neserhof suburbs).

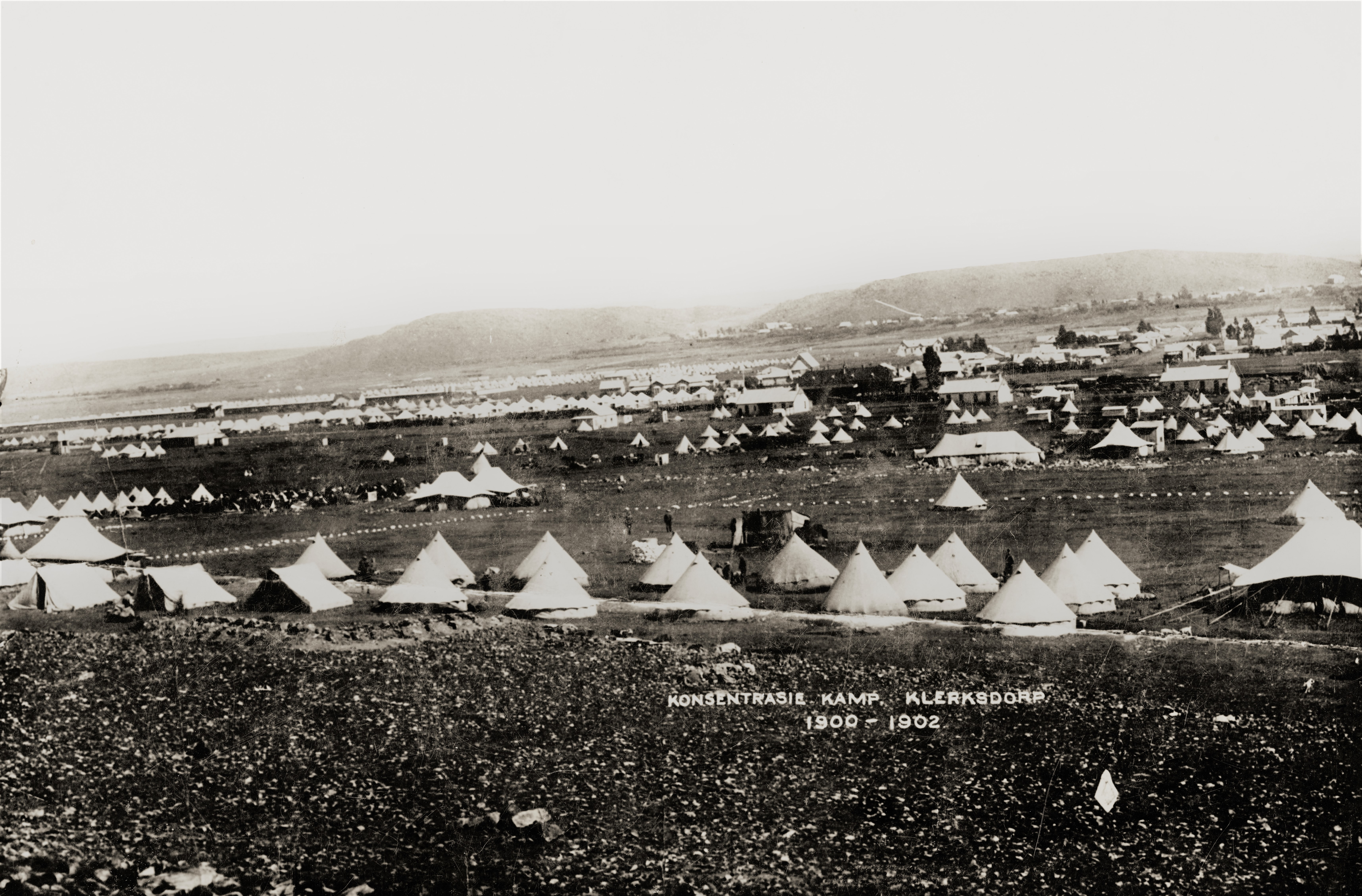
The concentration camp for Boers, c.1901

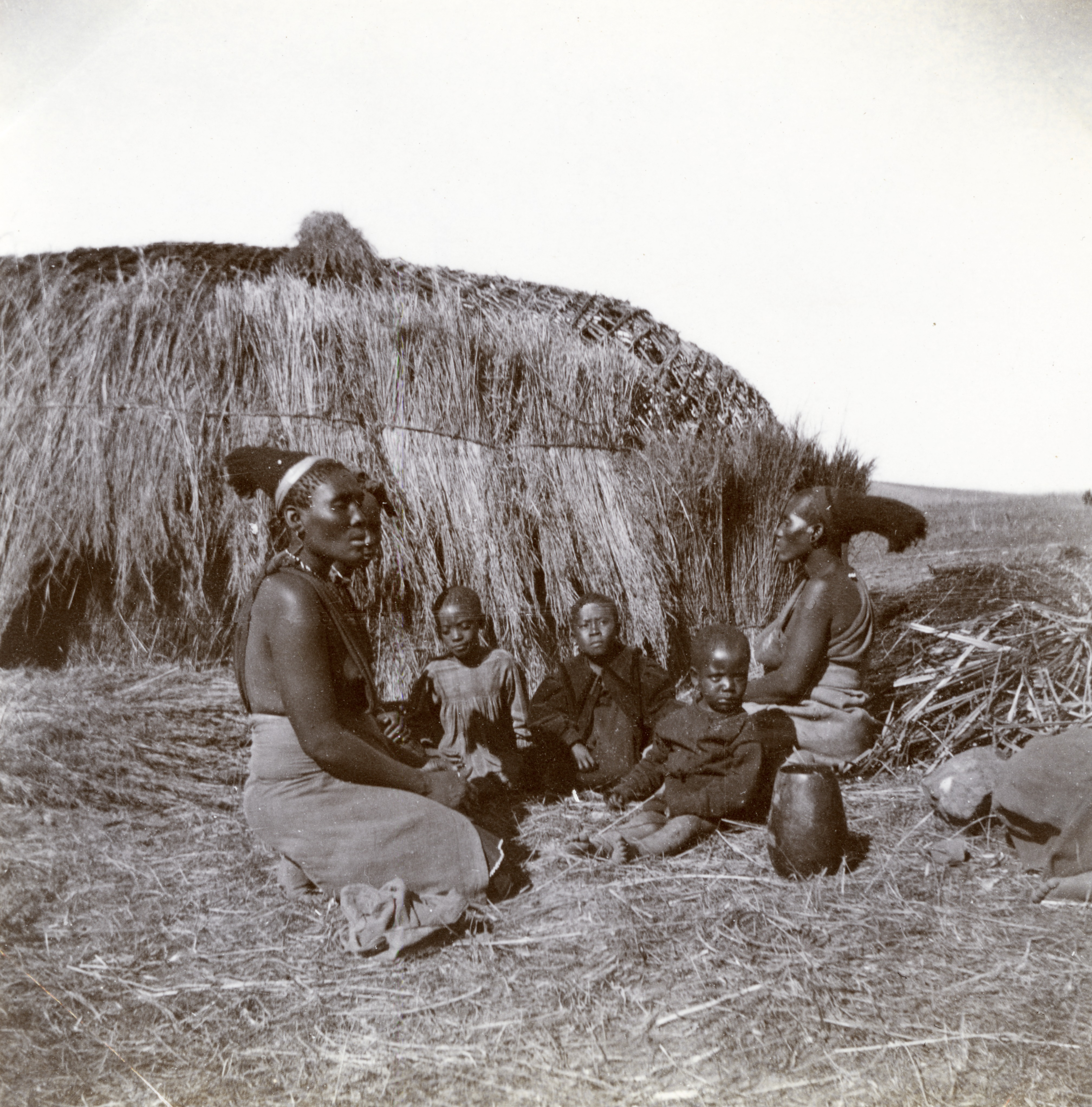
The camp for Blacks, c.1901

The most famous of the battles around Klerksdorp, is that of the Battle of Ysterspruit ("Iron Stream"), in which the Boer general Koos de la Rey achieved a great victory. The battle is one of the most celebrated of the general's career, being the battle in which the Boer soldiers pioneered the art of firing from horseback. On April 11, 1902, Rooiwal, near Klerksdorp, saw the Battle of Rooiwal, the last major engagement of the war, where a Boer charge was beaten off by entrenched British troops.

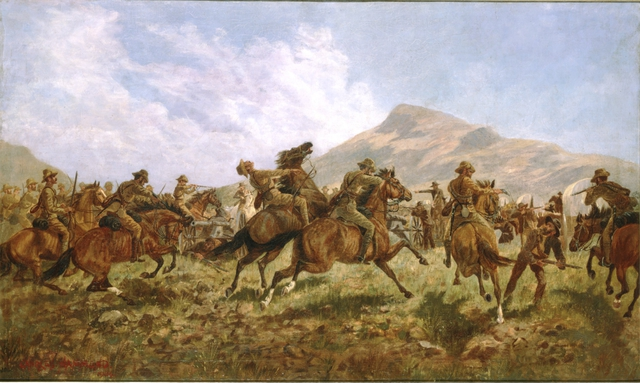
Australians and New Zealanders at Klerksdorp, 24 March 1901 by Charles Hammond (1904)

The graves of the victims of both the concentration camps can still be visited today in the Old Cemetery Complex just outside town, numbering just below a thousand.

=== Desmond Tutu and Boer heritage ===
Today Klerksdorp is celebrated as the birthplace of Anglican Archbishop Emeritus Desmond Mpilo Tutu on October 7, 1931. He received the Nobel Peace Prize in 1984 for his work towards "a democratic and just society without racial divisions". The life work of Desmond Tutu has been to heal the scars left among the descendants of the many battles for control of South Africa. There is an irony of his birthplace set amidst Boer monuments and old battlefields, early settlements by those same Boers, among them famous leaders like Jacob de Clerq, even close to Witwatersrand where gold was discovered. He somehow managed to rise beyond pettiness and division to bring all these forces together with displaced native peoples in places such as this creating an international role model. He was later awarded multiple worldwide honours for his achievements in the reconciliation of the ethnic and cultural divisions in the history of his country.

=== Economic revival since 1932 ===
The gold mining industry was revived by large mining companies in 1932 during the Free State Gold Rush, causing the town to undergo an economic revival, which accelerated after World War II.

=== Newspaper ===
The first local newspaper, The Klerksdorp Pioneer, was published in 1887. In November 1888 it was replaced by George Vickers's newspaper The Representative. This in turn was replaced by H.M Guest's Klerksdorp Mining Record in August 1899. It still exists as the Klerksdorp Record.

== Economy ==
=== Economic History ===
In 1865, twenty-eight years after Klerksdorp had been founded, James Taylor opened the doors of the dofF's first trading store. During 1871 he was joined in a partnership by Thomas Smith Leask, a retired elephant-hunter and trader. The store, known as "Taylor and Leask", was the only one at Klerksdorp and became the centre of the town's activities and the rendezvous of hunters and traders who brought ivory and skins from the "interior" (Matebeleland and Mashonaland) and refitted for their next expedition. Both Taylor and Leask were on friendly terms with the majority of the hunters and F .C. Selous, a prolific letter-writer, visited the town several times. In one of his letters he mentioned that it had cost him £1 600 to outfit at the Klerksdorp store. When Taylor died of fever in 1878, Thomas Leask bought out Mrs Taylor and re-established the firm on his own account, as "Thomas Leask and Co.

=== Mining ===
The introduction in April 1890 of a new gold recovery process by Mr John S. McArthur and Dr Forrest (known as the McArthur Forrest Cyanide Process, and mentioned earlier) made it possible to recover most of the gold contents which had hitherto been lost. This process signalled a new era of prosperity and brought about a revival, since advantage was taken of the newly-discovered methods and cyanide plants were built on several local mines.

Though the depression in the town was bad, several mines continued in production, and, coupled with agriculture, the slump was survived. Subsequent periods of depression and slumps have since hit the Klerksdorp district, but they have been mild in comparison with the dreadful experiences of 1889 and 1890. During December 1892 Thomas Leask, Managing Director of the Nooitgedacht mine, brought a glimmer of hope to some 200 people whom he addressed at the mine. He told the crowd that one thousand ounces of gold had been extracted. His daughter Lulu started the engine of the newly-installed five-stamp battery. The conventional bottle of champagne was broken and refreshments were served.

After several mines had installed the new cyanide process, the gold output, which was merely about 7 000 ounces in 1890, increasesd to 10 967 in 1892 and 12 780 in 1893. By the end of 1895 there were 25 companies in existence and the gold output soared to a phenomenal 71 776 ounces -it now appeared as if the gold industry in Klerksdorp was firmly established and the depression of the late eighties was finally shaken off.

== Geography ==
=== Climate ===
Klerksdorp has a semi-arid climate (BSk, according to the Köppen climate classification), with warm to hot summers and cool, dry winters. The average annual precipitation is 482 mm (19 in), with most of the rainfall occurring during summer.

Klerksdorp

Climate chart (precipitation, max. and min. temperature)
J	F	M	A	M	J	J	A	S	O	N	D
92 29 15	76 28 15	75 27 13	33 24 9	10 21 4	0 18 0	0 18 0	1 21 3	6 25 7	41 27 11	63 28 13	85 29 15
- █ Average max. and min. temperatures in °C
- █ Precipitation totals in mm
- Source: SA Explorer
Imperial conversion
J	F	M	A	M	J	J	A	S	O	N	D
3.6 84 59	3 82 59	3 81 55	1.3 75 48	0.4 70 39	0 64 32	0 64 32	0 70 37	0.2 77 45	1.6 81 52	2.5 82 55	3.3 84 59
- █ Average max. and min. temperatures in °F
- █ Precipitation totals in inches

=== Suburbs ===
Klerksdorp is divided into 35 suburbs

List of suburbs

Suburb	Suburb	Suburb
Adamayview	Alabama	Campbelldorp
Collerville	Dawkinsville	Doringkruin
Elandia	Elandsheuwel	Ellaton (New Industrial Area)
Flamwood	Flimieda	Freemanville
Irenepark	Jouberton	Lahoff
Meiringspark	Matlosane	Manzil Park
Neserhof	Oudorp	Pienaarsdorp
Randlespark	Roosheuwel	Songloed
Uraniaville (Old industrial area)	Wilkeville	Wilkoppies

=== Jouberton ===
Klerksdorp's black residential area was laid out in 1907 south of the town where the residential areas of Neserhof and Ellaton are today. Already in 1924, there was talk of moving the blacks, but it was decided to let it stand until the financial problems associated with such a move were resolved.

In 1935 and 1936, the city council once again decided to move them, but this was not carried out either.

With a view to the southward expansion of the town, the then city council was finally obliged to undertake the relocation. In 1949, construction began on the first 32 houses in the new black residential area, Jouberton. Originally it would be the name Joubertina, named after councilor Jan Joubert. Because there was already a town with this name in the Cape Province (now Eastern Cape), it was changed to Jouberton to avoid confusion.

=== Alabama ===
The Colored people first lived in an area adjacent to the old industrial area, but in 1956 the surveying of Alabama, the new residential area, began. Two years later, in 1958, the layout of the residential area began.

=== Klerksdorp district ===
The greater city area surrounding Klerksdorp incorporates the towns of Orkney, Kanana, Stilfontein, Khuma, Hartbeesfontein and Tigane, giving it a population of more than 350,000 inhabitants.

Due to their geographical location and interconnectedness, there has been talk of amalgamation between Klerksdorp, Stilfontein and Orkney since 1975 and in 1979 a commission of inquiry into the matter was established. However, both Stilfontein and Orkney's city council rejected the idea of amalgamation in 1980.

== Modern Klerksdorp ==
=== Modern economy ===
All of the South African major banks like FNB, ABSA, Standard Bank, Nedbank and Capitec Bank have branches in the city.

Together with Rustenburg, Klerksdorp forms the economic heart of North West Province. It is one of the hubs of the South African gold mining industry, although its importance has been decreasing in recent years. A major earthquake in March 2005 caused significant damage to the eastern suburb of Stilfontein and caused widespread damage to mining activities. It is expected to be a large uranium producer in the future.

Apart from mining, Klerksdorp is positioned as a notable medical, retail and educational centre for North West Province and Northern Free State.

The Klerksdorp district is a major contributor to South African agriculture; maize, sorghum, groundnuts and sunflower are important crops farmed in the district. Klerksdorp has the largest agricultural co-op in the Southern Hemisphere, named 'Senwes'.

The farming district is also known for its Sussex cattle herds - the city is the headquarters of the South African Sussex Cattle Breeders Association.

Several national departments and agencies have branches offices in the city (SARS and the Department of Home Affairs)

=== Education ===
In the city, there are numerous schools catered to primary and secondary schooling, as well as public and private.

The private schools for example are Klerksdorp Christian Academy, Curro Castle Klerksdorp, Methodist Primary School, Kingston Primary School, and Ashton John's School.

The public schools consist of Klerksdorp Primary School, Hoërskool Klerksdorp, Technical High School, Hoërskool Schoonspruit, Goudkop Primary School, Milner High School, Wesvalia High School, Laerskool La Hoff, Janie Schneider School, Laerskool Saamtrek, Laerskool Unie, Laerskool Roosheuwel, Laerskool Meiringspark, Keurhof School, and New Vision Secondary School.

=== Diplomatic Missions ===
The following countries have consulates in the city

Lesotho

== Transport ==
=== Airport ===
P.C Pelser Airport is a medium-sized airport in South Africa, serving the region of Klerksdorp. The airport is mostly used by private local residents.

For scheduled international and domestic air services, Klerksdorp is currently served by O.R Tambo International Airport.

=== Roads ===
The N12 is the major freeway that runs through Klerksdorp, connecting it to Kimberley in the south-west and to Potchefstroom and Johannesburg in the east. Klerksdorp is also served by provincial and regional roads. The R30 road passes through Klerksdorp, connecting it to Orkney, Welkom and Bloemfontein in the south and Ventersdorp and Rustenburg in the north. The R503 road begins just west of Klerksdorp (at Freemanville), connecting it with Hartbeesfontein, Coligny, Lichtenburg and Mahikeng to the north-west.

The town’s road network has deteriorated markedly in recent years, with widespread pothole damage reported on several primary and secondary routes as of 2025. Local media note that motorists frequently swerve to avoid the damaged sections, giving rise to a tongue-in-cheek remark that police “stop any driver who manages to drive in a perfectly straight line,” a reflection of the scale of the problem.

=== Railway ===
The first rail connection was that from Krugersdorp in 1897, the station was built by Netherlands–South African Railway Company and officially opened by President Kruger on the 3 August 1897. Just after the Anglo-Boer War, railway lines were extended to other parts of the country.

In 1905 the line was extended to Vierfontein and Kroonstad. In 1906 Veertienstrome line was opened connecting Klerksdorp and Cape Town. In 1928 the link with Hartebeesfontein and Ottosdal followed.

== Infrastructure ==
=== Electricity ===
The South African state-owned power company ESKOM operates several substations in the city.

Substation	Suburbs
West	Roosheuwel, Freemanville, Elandia, Declerqville, Meiringspark, Songloed, Uraniaville, Oleander Park, Manzilpark, Alabama (Ext 1 & 2)
Jouberton	Jouberton, Tshepong Hospital, Alabama (Ext 3; 4 & 5)
Main	CBD, Randlespark, Ellaton, Neserhof, Klerkindustria, Oudorp Pienaarsdorp, Dawkinsville, N12 South (Senwes to CTM)
North	Doringkruin, Wilkoppies, Wilkeville, Irenepark, Lahoff, Adamayview, Flimieda, Gumtree

After the discovery of gold, the government during the late 1880s and early 1890s was overwhelmed by the request of citizens of the town with electricity or gas. A concession for the supply of electricity was indeed granted to A. Barnard and A.P.J. Cronje.

However, due to the already mentioned slump in the gold mining industry, the further setback with rinderpest and the Second Freedom War, citizens were not fortunate enough to enjoy these luxuries early.

The power station was later enlarged and replaced in 1934 by a new scheme, which was erected at a cost of R65 000. Ten years later, in 1944, the city council decided to no longer operate its own power station and since then the power has been supplied to the Electricity Supply Commission (ESKOM).

== Landmarks ==
- Mining shafts excavated in the 1880s.
- The Klerksdorp Museum. It was built in 1891 as a prison and served as such until 1973. The house of the warden hosts period exhibitions. It exhibits the Klerksdorp spheres, spherical to subspherical objects that pseudoarcheologists consider to be man-made.
- The Faan Meintjies Nature Reserve, located about 15 km (9.3 mi) from Klerksdorp. It has 30 species of game and 150 species of birds.
- The Oudorp hiking trail. It is a 12 km (7.5 mi) long trail and winds its way through the oldest parts of the town.
- Goudkoppie (Gold Hill) is the city's latest tourist attraction. It is situated near both the N12 highway and the Johannesburg-Cape Town railway line.
- The Johan Neser Dam (also known to the general public as Klerksdorp Dam) 10 km (6.2 mi) outside Klerksdorp on the road to Ventersdorp.

=== Rio Casino Resort ===
The resort takes its name and inspiration from the Brazilian city, bringing a carnival atmosphere to the former Transvaal Republic. At 266,330 square feet (24,743 m^{2}), it is one of the largest casinos in the Southern Hemisphere.

=== Matlosana Mall ===
Matlosana Mall is the largest shopping centre in the North-West Province. The mall's retail mix of 145 stores is led by anchor retailers Checkers, Pick n Pay, Woolworths, Edgars, Foschini, Sportsman's Warehouse and Incredible Connection. It has fashion, lifestyle and sports retailers, as well as entertainment and restaurants.

=== Protea Hotel ===
Klerksdorp Protea Hotel

General information
- Location: Between Barand and Margaretha Prinsloo Streets, Klerksdorp, South Africa, 2571
- Opened: 1995
- Owner: Protea Hotels by Marriott

Other information
- Number of rooms: 91
- Number of restaurants: 1 (Pinotage Restaurant)
- Facilities: 5 conference rooms

Website
- www.marriott.com/en-us/hotels/jnbkl-protea-hotel-klerksdorp/overview/

=== City Hall ===
The market building, which was used as a municipal office building, became inadequate over time and it was decided to erect a new city office building. On October 10, 1949, the cornerstone was laid by Dr. W. Nicol, administrator of Transvaal laid and the building was completed in 1951.

A born Klerksdorper, dr. T. E. Dönges, then Minister of Home Affairs observed the official inauguration. The famous Gerhard Moerdyk was the architect. The last part of the complex, the town hall, was inaugurated on 19 February 1963 when C.R. Swart, first State President of the Republic of South Africa, delivered the opening speech.

== Sport ==
The Harry Oppenheimer Stadium situated between Klerksdorp and Vaal River Operations is a popular sports field for some of the bigger schools' athletics competitions. The stadium was originally considered as one of the host cities for the 2010 FIFA World Cup but lost its bid to the Rustenburg Royal Bafokeng Stadium.

== Notable people ==
- Errol Damelin (born 23 August 1969), entrepreneur and co-founded Wonga, an internet payday loan company.
- Wiehahn Herbst (born 1988) - rugby union player for the Tel Aviv Heat
- Marco Jansen - South African cricketer
- André Esterhuizen - Springboks Rugby player
- Philemon Raul Masinga
- Ayanda Jiya
- Maglera Doe Boy - Rapper
- Joe McGluwa- Member of Parliament at the National Assembly
- Marnus Labuschagne - Australian cricketer
- Lesego Senokwane - South African cricketer

=== Gianfranco Cicogna-Mozzoni ===
Gianfranco Cicogna-Mozzoni died on 30 June 2012 at the Klerksdorp Air Show when his Aero L-39 Albatros got into the wake turbulence of the lead aircraft and suffered a compressor stall, followed by a high-speed wing stall, before hitting the ground at a 50-degree angle. The plane exploded on impact.

His great-grandfather was Giuseppe Volpi dei Misurata (1877-1947), known as Italy's Rockefeller, who served as the Italian Minister of Finance between 1910 and 1940, as well as the last and Governor of North Africa. He brought electrical power to Italy, built the industrial port of Marghera in Venice and started Italy's famous Ciga hotels and banking groups Banca Commerciale Italiana and Credito Commercio Italiano. The family was also involved in Rome's film industry, producing spaghetti Westerns.

He has also previously dated Ghislaine Maxwell.

=== Desmond Mpilo Tutu ===
Desmond Mpilo Tutu (7 October 1931 – 26 December 2021) was a South African Anglican bishop and theologian, known for his work as an anti-apartheid and human rights activist. He was Bishop of Johannesburg from 1985 to 1986 and then Archbishop of Cape Town from 1986 to 1996, in both cases being the first black African to hold the position. Theologically, he sought to fuse ideas from black theology with African theology.

=== Herbert Melville Guest ===
Herbert Guest was the second Mayor of Klerksdorp (1910- 1911) since the town was declared a municipality in 1903.

== Healthcare ==
Four private hospitals in the city lifts Klerksdorp's medical status in the North West Province. Adding to this is the advanced cancer treatment at some hospitals drawing in patients from all over the district. Wilmed Park Private Hospital

=== Life Anncron Hospital ===
Life Anncron Hospital has five theatres, several specialised intensive-care units, a 16-bed maternity unit and the only cardiology facility in the central region of the North West Province.

=== Klerksdorp/Tshepong ===
Klerksdorp Tshepong Hospital Complex is a public district hospital in Klerksdorp, North West Province. Klerksdorp Hospital was built in 1896, Tshepong hospital in 1978. In 1999 the two hospitals became a fully departmentalised Hospital complex.

=== Sunningdale Private Hospital ===
Sunningdale is situated in a suburb of Klerksdorp.

== Law Enforcement ==
The latest crime statistics for Klerksdorp Police Precinct was issued by the South African Police Service (SAPS) in September 2012. The SAPS crime report showed the following information:

In comparison to other major towns and cities in South Africa, Klerksdorp is still considered one of the safer locations in the nation.

== Klerksdorp district ==
The Klerksdorp district consist of the towns Klerksdorp, Hartbeesfontein, Orkney and Stilfontein. Together they are known as the KOSH-area.

== See also ==
- Doornhoek Solar Power Station
