= Pudimoe =

- Location within North West (South African province) Location within South Africa
- Coordinates: 27.383333°S 24.716667°E
- Country: South Africa
- Province: North West
- District: Dr Ruth Segomotsi Mompati
- Municipality: Greater Taung

Area
  - Total: 3.64 km^{2} (1.41 sq mi)

Population (2011)
  - Total: 3,078
  - Density: 846/km^{2} (2,190/sq mi)

Racial makeup (2011)
  - Black African: 98.1%
  - Coloured: 1.0%
  - Indian/Asian: 0.5%
  - White: 0.2%
  - Other: 0.2%

First languages (2011)
  - Tswana: 88.1%
  - English: 2.4%
  - Sotho: 2.3%
  - Zulu: 1.8%
  - Other: 5.3%
- Time zone: UTC+2 (SAST)
- Postal code (street): 8581
- PO box: 8581
- Area code: 053

Pudimoe or Pudumong is a town in Dr Ruth Segomotsi Mompati District Municipality in the North West province of South Africa.

The town is located about 17 kilometres (11 mi) north of Taung and 66 kilometres (41 mi) south-west of Schweizer-Reneke. The name, derived from the Tswana language, means “place of goats”. It formerly bore the adapted name Pudimoe, which is still in use at the town’s train station.
