= R503 (South Africa) =

Regional route in South Africa

Regional route R503

Route information
- Length: 165 km (103 mi)

Major junctions
- Southeast end: N12 near Klerksdorp
- R507 in Hartbeesfontein; N14 in Coligny; R52 / R505 in Lichtenburg
- Northwest end: N18 / R49 in Mahikeng

Location
- Country: South Africa
- Major cities: Klerksdorp, Hartbeesfontein, Coligny, Lichtenburg, Mahikeng

Highway system
- Numbered routes of South Africa
← R502	→ R504

The R503 is a Regional Route in North West, South Africa that connects Mahikeng with Klerksdorp via Lichtenburg and Coligny.

== Route ==
The R503 begins in the town of Mahikeng, the capital of the North West, at a four-way-junction with the N18 national route and the R49 route. It goes south-east for 62 kilometres, forming the southern border of the Mafikeng Game Reserve, bypassing Itsoseng, to the town of Lichtenburg, where it enters in an easterly direction and meets the R505 route.

The R503 joins the R505 to become one road southwards as Thabo Mbeki Drive before becoming Republiek Street eastwards to reach a junction with the R52 route (Dr Nelson Mandela Drive) in the town centre. The R503 & R505 join the R52 southwards on Dr Nelson Mandela Drive for 2 kilometres up to the junction with 12th Avenue, where the R52 becomes its own road south-westwards. At the next junction, the R505 becomes its own road southwards while the R503 turns to the south-east as Kalkweg Way.

From Lichtenburg, the R503 goes south-east for 21 kilometres to the town of Coligny, where it meets the N14 national route at a T-junction west of the town centre. The N14 joins the R503 and they share one road south-east for 2 kilometres up to a junction south of the town centre, where the R503 becomes its own road southwards.

From Coligny, the R503 goes southwards for 52 kilometres to the town of Hartbeesfontein, where it meets the R507 route east of the town centre. The R507 joins the R503 and they share one road south-east for almost 2 kilometres before the R507 becomes its own road westwards. From Hartbeesfontein, the R503 goes south-east for 20 kilometres to enter the city of Klerksdorp and reach its terminus at a T-junction with the N12 national route in the suburb of Freemanville (west of the city centre; north of Jouberton).
