= Kanana, North West =

Kanana maweza
- Location within North West (South African province) Location within South Africa
- Coordinates: 26.954°S 26.633°E
- Country: South Africa
- Province: North West
- District: Dr Kenneth Kaunda
- Municipality: City of Matlosana

Area
  - Total: 14.25 km^{2} (5.50 sq mi)

Population (2011)
  - Total: 78,419
  - Density: 5,503/km^{2} (14,250/sq mi)

Racial makeup (2011)
  - Black African: 98.6%
  - Coloured: 0.8%
  - Indian/Asian: 0.3%
  - Other: 0.2%

First languages (2011)
  - Sotho: 49.7%
  - Xhosa: 19.6%
  - Tswana: 19.4%
  - Zulu: 2.8%
  - Other: 8.4%
- Time zone: UTC+2 (SAST)
- Postal code (street): 2619
- PO box: 9944
- Area code: 2619

Kanana is a township near the city of Orkney in Dr Kenneth Kaunda District Municipality in the North West province of South Africa.
