= Setlagole =

Setlagole (Serolong) Se tla a gola
- Location within North West (South African province) Location within South Africa
- Coordinates: 26.287°S 25.117°E
- Country: South Africa
- Province: North West
- Municipality: Ratlou

Area
  - Total: 30.78 km^{2} (11.88 sq mi)

Population (2011)
  - Total: 19,452
  - Density: 632.0/km^{2} (1,637/sq mi)

Racial makeup (2011)
  - Black African: 98.4%
  - Coloured: 1.2%
  - Indian/Asian: 0.3%
  - White: 0.1%
  - Other: 0.1%

First languages (2011)
  - Tswana: 91.7%
  - Sotho: 1.9%
  - English: 1.7%
  - S. Ndebele: 1.2%
  - Other: 3.5%
- Time zone: UTC+2 (SAST)
- PO box: 2773
- Area code: 018

Setlagole (Se tla a gola) is a historical Setswana village next to the N18 in Ngaka Modiri Molema District Municipality in the North West province of South Africa.

== History ==
=== Battle of Mosita ===
From Setlagole the Barolong and Bahurutshe launched their own hit-and-run attacks into the Rustenburg and Schoonspruit as well as southern Marico districts.

Thereafter, Setlagole became a staging post for raids on Boer farms in the western Transvaal. A surviving Boer document records the loss of 287 cattle from eight Schoonspruit farms during one such foray."

=== Megabreccia outcrops ===
"A 25 to 30 km wide magnetic anomaly within the >2.79 Ga granite-greenstone rocks of the northwestern Kaapvaal Craton is spatially associated with megabreccia outcrops near the village of Setlagole in the North West Province, South Africa. The breccia comprises angular to rounded ciasts of TTG gneisses, granites and granodiorites, with lesser amounts of amphibolite, calc-silicate rock and banded iron-formation as well as unusual dark grey to black, irregular, centimetre- to decimetre-sized ciasts that show evidence of fluidal behaviour and plastic deformation during incorporation into the breccia."
