= Geluksoord =

- Location within North West (South African province) Location within South Africa
- Coordinates: 27.9017°S 25.1461°E
- Country: South Africa
- Province: North West
- District: Dr Ruth Segomotsi Mompati
- Municipality: Lekwa-Teemane

Area
  - Total: 0.74 km^{2} (0.29 sq mi)

Population (2011)
  - Total: 3,142
  - Density: 4,200/km^{2} (11,000/sq mi)

Racial makeup (2011)
  - Black African: 74.2%
  - Coloured: 24.6%
  - Indian/Asian: 0.3%
  - White: 0.5%
  - Other: 0.4%

First languages (2011)
  - Tswana: 63.1%
  - Afrikaans: 25.1%
  - Sotho: 3.5%
  - Xhosa: 3.1%
  - Other: 5.3%
- Time zone: UTC+2 (SAST)
- Postal code (street): 2680
- PO box: 2680

Geluksoord is a township near to Christiana in Dr Ruth Segomotsi Mompati District Municipality in the North West province of South Africa.
