= Makwassie =

- Location within North West (South African province) Location within South Africa
- Coordinates: 27°19′S 25°59′E
- Country: South Africa
- Province: North West
- District: Dr Kenneth Kaunda
- Municipality: Maquassi Hills

Area
  - Total: 6.19 km^{2} (2.39 sq mi)

Population (2011)
  - Total: 13,351
  - Density: 2,160/km^{2} (5,590/sq mi)

Racial makeup (2011)
  - Black African: 90.2%
  - Coloured: 4.1%
  - Indian/Asian: 0.7%
  - White: 5.0%
  - Other: 0.1%

First languages (2011)
  - Tswana: 74.4%
  - Afrikaans: 8.2%
  - Sotho: 7.5%
  - Xhosa: 4.7%
  - Other: 5.1%
- Time zone: UTC+2 (SAST)
- Postal code (street): 2650
- PO box: 2650
- Area code: 018

Makwassie is a small farming town situated in North West Province of South Africa that produces maize, sorghum, groundnuts and milk. The word makwassie is a corruption of the San word for an aromatic wild spearmint.

In 1822 the town was established as a mission station by Samuel Broadbent and Thomas Hodgson of the Wesleyan Missionary Society and the town was laid out in 1907.

Makwasi is a centre for maize, groundnuts, sorghum and milk production

Makwassie is located 14 kilometres (8.7 mi) south of Wolmaransstad and 78 kilometres (48 mi) north-west of Wesselsbron. It was laid out in 1907 and proclaimed in 1910. At first spelt Maquassi, it was standardized as Makwassie in 1937. The first white child in Transvaal was born there, and the first printing undertaken.

The town claims four distinctions in Transvaal history:

- the first Christian mission station north of the Vaal River - built by Wesleyans Samuel Broadbent and Thomas Hogson in 1822.
- the first White person born - July 1823
- the first printed matter - a Tswana spelling book and religious tracts
- the oldest town hall - built in 1910
