= Stilfontein =

- Location within North West (South African province) Location within South Africa
- Coordinates: 26°50′34″S 26°46′28″E
- Country: South Africa
- Province: North West
- District: Dr Kenneth Kaunda
- Municipality: City of Matlosana

Government
  - Executive Mayor: Fikile Mahlophe
  - Predecessor: James Tsolela

Area
  - Total: 138.82 km^{2} (53.60 sq mi)

Population (2011)
  - Total: 17,942
  - Density: 129.25/km^{2} (334.75/sq mi)

Racial makeup (2011)
  - Black: 42.5%
  - Coloured: 1.5%
  - Indian/Asian: 0.3%
  - White: 55.5%
  - Other: 0.2%

First languages (2011)
  - Afrikaans: 53.2%
  - Tswana: 22.1%
  - English: 10.6%
  - Sotho: 10.2%
  - Other: 14.8%
- Time zone: UTC+2 (SAST)
- Postal code (street): 2550
- PO box: 2551
- Area code: 018

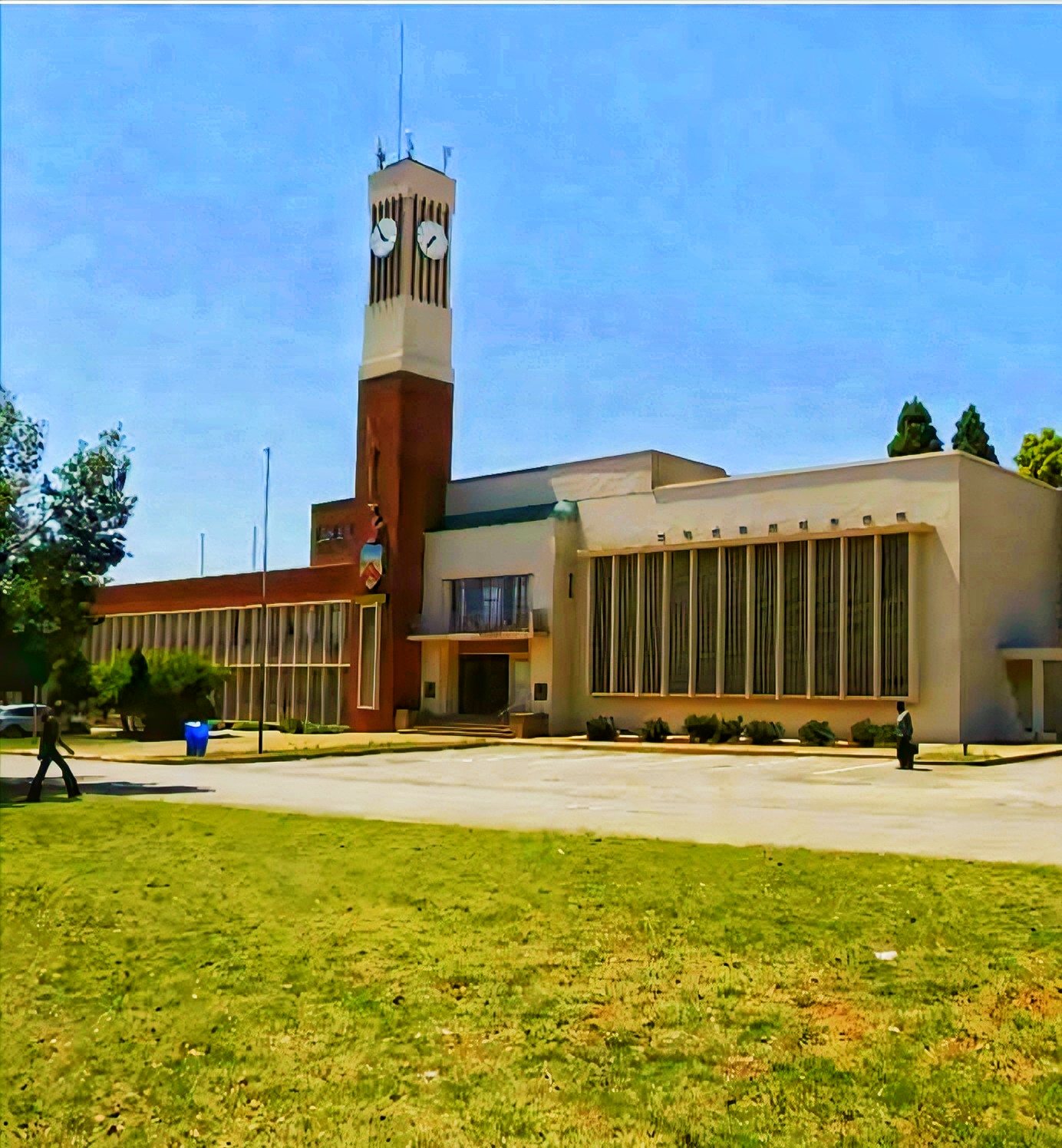
Municipal building in Stilfontein, North West Province, South Africa.

Stilfontein (Afrikaans for quiet spring) is a mining town which is located on the N12 road with 17,942 inhabitants, situated between Klerksdorp and Potchefstroom in North West Province of South Africa. It was incorporated into the City of Matlosana.

== Pre-establishment history ==
Before the establishment of the town of Stilfontein in 1949, the area formed part of farmland in the Klerksdorp region and was known for its natural water sources, from which the name Stilfontein (Afrikaans for "quiet spring") is derived.

Gold prospecting in the wider Klerksdorp area intensified after the discovery of gold in 1888. In that year, a prospector named Charles Scott discovered an outcrop of a gold-bearing reef on the farm Strathvaal, which he named the Strathmore Reef. Although early prospecting did not immediately lead to large-scale mining, the discovery indicated the presence of economically viable gold deposits in the region.

Following Scott's death, his son Jack Scott continued prospecting activities in the area. Further exploration and drilling on nearby farms, including the farm Stilfontein, confirmed the existence of payable gold reefs. These findings eventually led to renewed interest in deep-level mining several decades later.

In 1949, the Stilfontein Gold Mining Company was registered, and major shafts were sunk to access the reef at depth. The success of these mining operations directly led to the formal establishment of the town of Stilfontein as a planned mining settlement to house mine employees and provide supporting infrastructure.

== Town establishment and growth ==
Stilfontein was established in 1949 as a purpose-built mining town to support large-scale gold mining operations in the Klerksdorp goldfield in what is today the North West Province of South Africa."Some History – Stilfontein Dorp / Town". The town was developed primarily as a residential and administrative centre for employees of three major gold mines in the area, namely the Stilfontein Mine, the Hartebeesfontein Mine, and the Buffelsfontein Mine."Some History – Stilfontein Dorp / Town". Its location and urban layout were shaped by the requirements of the mining industry, with housing, transport links, and public services designed to accommodate a growing workforce. The event that led directly to the establishment of the town occurred in May 1949, when two major shafts, known as Charles and Margaret, were successfully sunk at the Stilfontein Mine."Some History – Stilfontein Dorp / Town". The success of these shafts confirmed the presence of economically viable gold-bearing reefs and marked a significant step in the expansion of deep-level gold mining in the region. This success also contributed to the subsequent opening and development of the nearby Hartebeesfontein and Buffelsfontein mines, which together formed an integrated mining complex within the Klerksdorp goldfield."Some History – Stilfontein Dorp / Town". An important engineering milestone in Stilfontein’s early mining history was the construction of the Margaret Shaft headgear at the Stilfontein Mine. This structure was the first concrete headgear ever erected in South Africa and represented a departure from the steel headgears commonly used at the time."Some History – Stilfontein Dorp / Town". The headgear was designed locally and constructed entirely from local materials. The tower mounted on the headgear housed South Africa’s first multi-rope Koepe hoist, an advanced hoisting system that improved efficiency and safety in deep-level mining operations."Some History – Stilfontein Dorp / Town". During the second half of the twentieth century, Stilfontein expanded alongside the growth of the surrounding mines. The town developed essential infrastructure, including schools, healthcare facilities, commercial areas, and recreational amenities, and became a stable mining community closely linked to the regional gold-mining economy. At its peak, Stilfontein formed part of one of the most productive gold-mining regions in South Africa. Mining operations at the Stilfontein Mine came to an end in 2013, reflecting the broader decline of deep-level gold mining in South Africa due to rising operational costs, declining ore grades, and increasing safety challenges."South Africa police vow to arrest illegal miners at Stilfontein". BBC News. Following the closure of the mine, abandoned shafts and underground workings became sites of illicit mining activity. Informal miners, commonly referred to as zama zamas, have attempted to extract remaining gold deposits from the disused infrastructure, leading to ongoing safety, environmental, and law enforcement concerns in the area."South Africa police vow to arrest illegal miners at Stilfontein". BBC News.

=== Civic Centre and planned urban layout ===
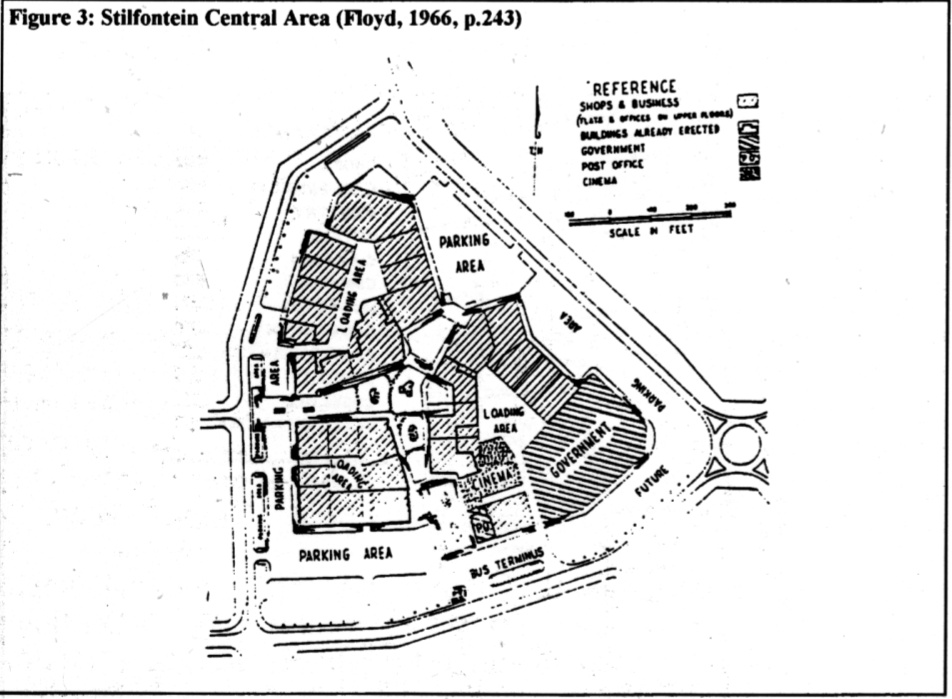
Stilfontein Central area 1966

As a purpose‑built mining town established in 1949, Stilfontein’s early urban planning included a central civic and commercial area that came to be known as the Civic Centre. This central precinct was designed as part of the town’s modern layout, with municipal services, shops, and community facilities clustered in a defined core rather than developing organically along a single main street. The civic centre served as a focal point for public life and commerce in Stilfontein, reflecting planning ideals of the mid‑20th century that emphasised organised town centres. The Civic Centre continues to house shops, businesses, and community services.

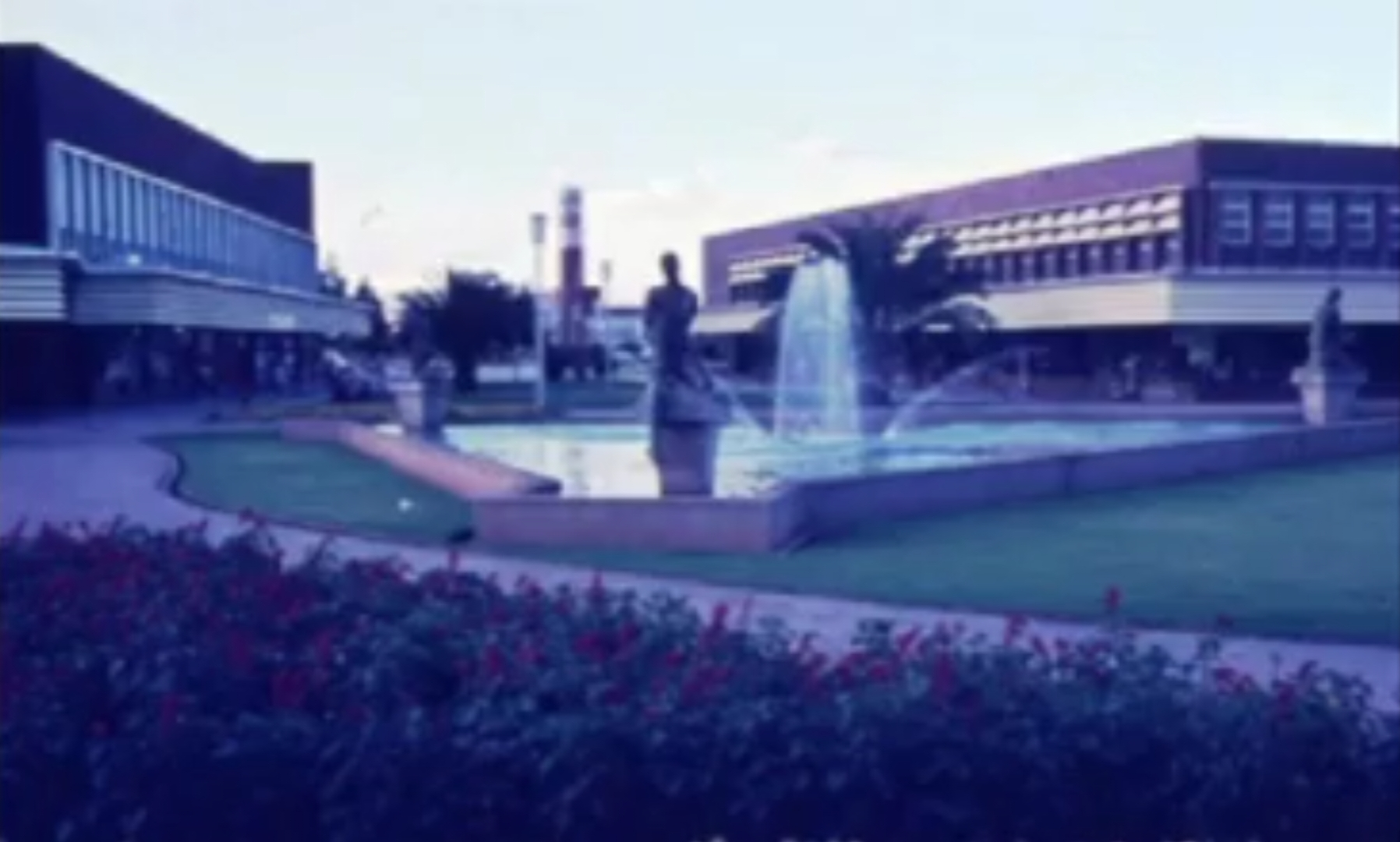
Stilfontein civic centre 1970s

=== Public swimming pool ===
Stilfontein formerly had a municipal public swimming pool which served as a recreational and sporting facility for local residents for several decades. The pool was used for public swimming, swimming lessons, and school and community events, and formed part of the town’s municipal amenities during the latter half of the 20th century.

By the early 2000s, the facility experienced declining maintenance, reportedly due to municipal budgetary constraints and reduced capacity following the economic decline of the local mining industry. As with many public swimming pools in smaller South African towns, rising maintenance costs and infrastructure deterioration contributed to its eventual closure. The pool closed permanently in the 2000s or early 2010s, after which the site fell into disuse.

=== Nederduitse Gereformeerde Kerk, Stilfontein ===
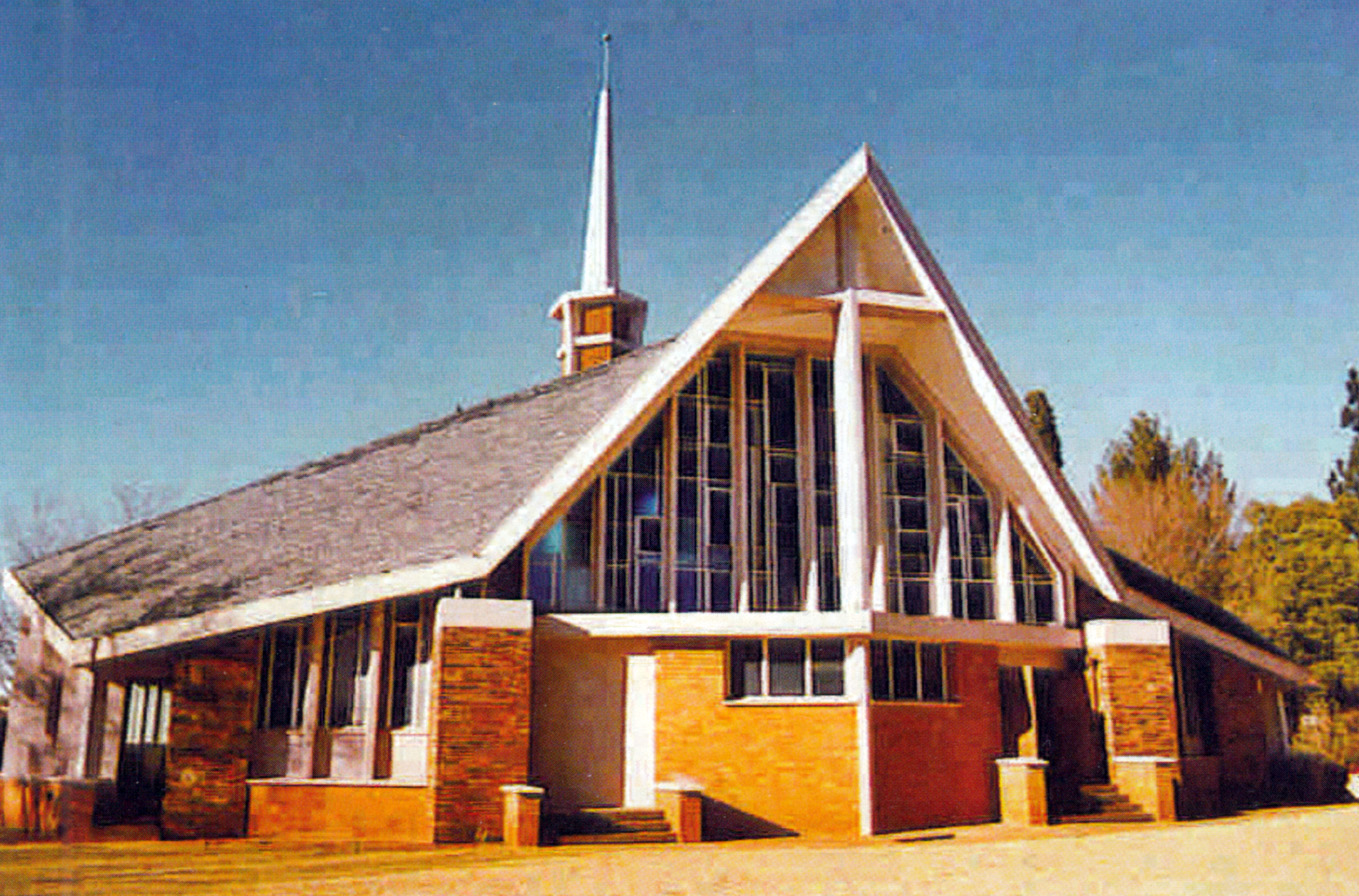
Gereformeerde kerk stilfontein

The Nederduitse Gereformeerde Kerk (NG Kerk) Stilfontein was formed when Stilfontein and Orkney were separated as a congregation from Klerksdorp on 27 October 1957. The first ordained minister (dominee) to serve the congregation was J.F. du Plooy, who was confirmed on 22 February 1957.[¹][²]

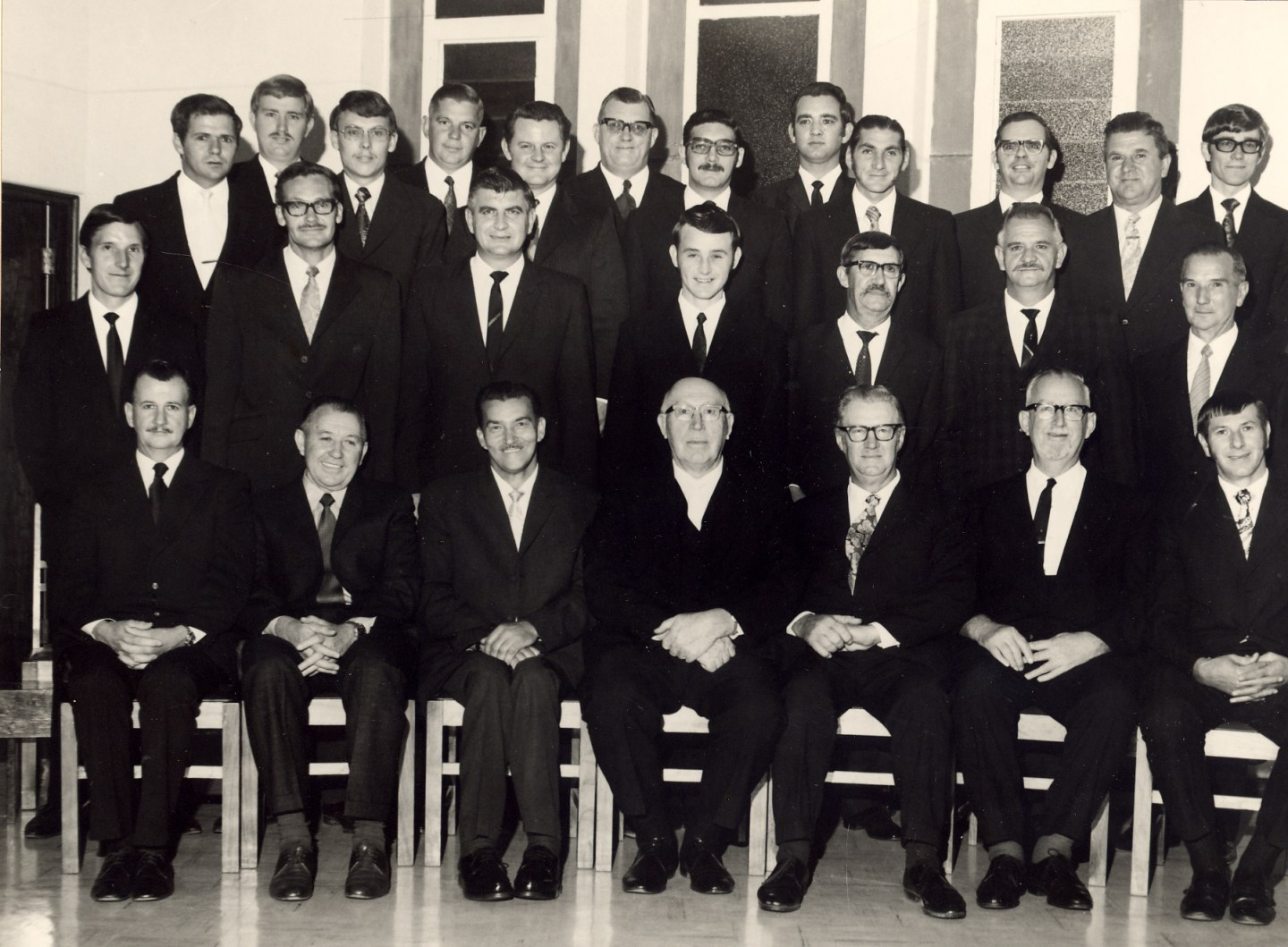
Gk stilfontein se kerkraad met emeritering van ds jf du plooy 22 sept 1974

The congregation’s first dedicated church building was constructed beginning in May 1963, with the foundation stone being laid on 13 May 1963. The church was officially taken into use on 31 August 1963. During construction the congregation worshipped in local school halls. The completed church and organ were consecrated and used for Sunday services from this date.[²]

== Geography and topography ==
Stilfontein is located in the North West province of South Africa, approximately 10 km north-east of Klerksdorp, within the City of Matlosana Local Municipality. The town lies on the interior plateau of South Africa, forming part of the Highveld.

The surrounding terrain is flat to gently undulating, characterised by open plains typical of the Highveld region. Stilfontein lies at an elevation of approximately 1,350–1,400 metres above sea level, which contributes to moderate daytime temperatures and cooler nights, particularly during winter.

The area forms part of the Witwatersrand Basin, which contains gold-bearing reef formations that led to the establishment of Stilfontein as a mining town. As a result, the local landscape has been influenced by mining-related features such as mine shafts, tailings, and slimes dams.

Surface water is limited, and the town relies largely on groundwater and regional water systems. The Schoonspruit, a tributary of the Vaal River, flows south of Stilfontein. Natural vegetation in the area consists mainly of grassland, adapted to semi-arid conditions and seasonal rainfall.

== Etymology ==
The name Stilfontein is derived from Afrikaans, meaning “quiet spring” or “calm fountain.” The name is believed to refer to the natural springs in the area, which were notable to early settlers and miners. It reflects the town’s origins as a settlement near water sources and the peaceful character of the locality before the expansion of gold mining operations. Stilfontein is also locally known as the City of Roses, a nickname that highlights the town’s tradition of cultivating rose gardens and maintaining floral displays throughout the community.

== Demographics ==
According to the 2011 Census, the population of Stilfontein was 17,942. The population density was 1,717 persons per km^{2} (663 persons per mi^{2}).

== Notable people ==
- Ingrid de Kok (born 1951), South African author and poet who grew up in Stilfontein."Ingrid de Kok".
- Pierre van Pletzen (born 1952), South African actor and director, born in Stilfontein."Pierre van Pletzen".
- Thato Thelma Mosehle (born 1995), model and Miss Supranational South Africa 2021, born in Stilfontein."Thato Mosehle".
- Bennett Masinga (1965–2013), professional South African footballer active in South African leagues, died in Stilfontein."Bennett Masinga".
- Dr Pieter Groenewald (born 27 August 1955), South African politician and Minister of Correctional Services; he served as Mayor of Stilfontein from 1988 until his election to the national parliament in 1989."Pieter Groenewald".
- Felix du Plessis Springbok rugby player Felix du Plessis

== Tourist attractions ==
- Hartebeesfontein Gold Mine
- Annual Rose Festival in spring
- Matlosana Mall
- Ngwenya Hotel & Conference
- Stilfontein People's Hall (Gentle Breezers Hall)

== Earthquakes ==
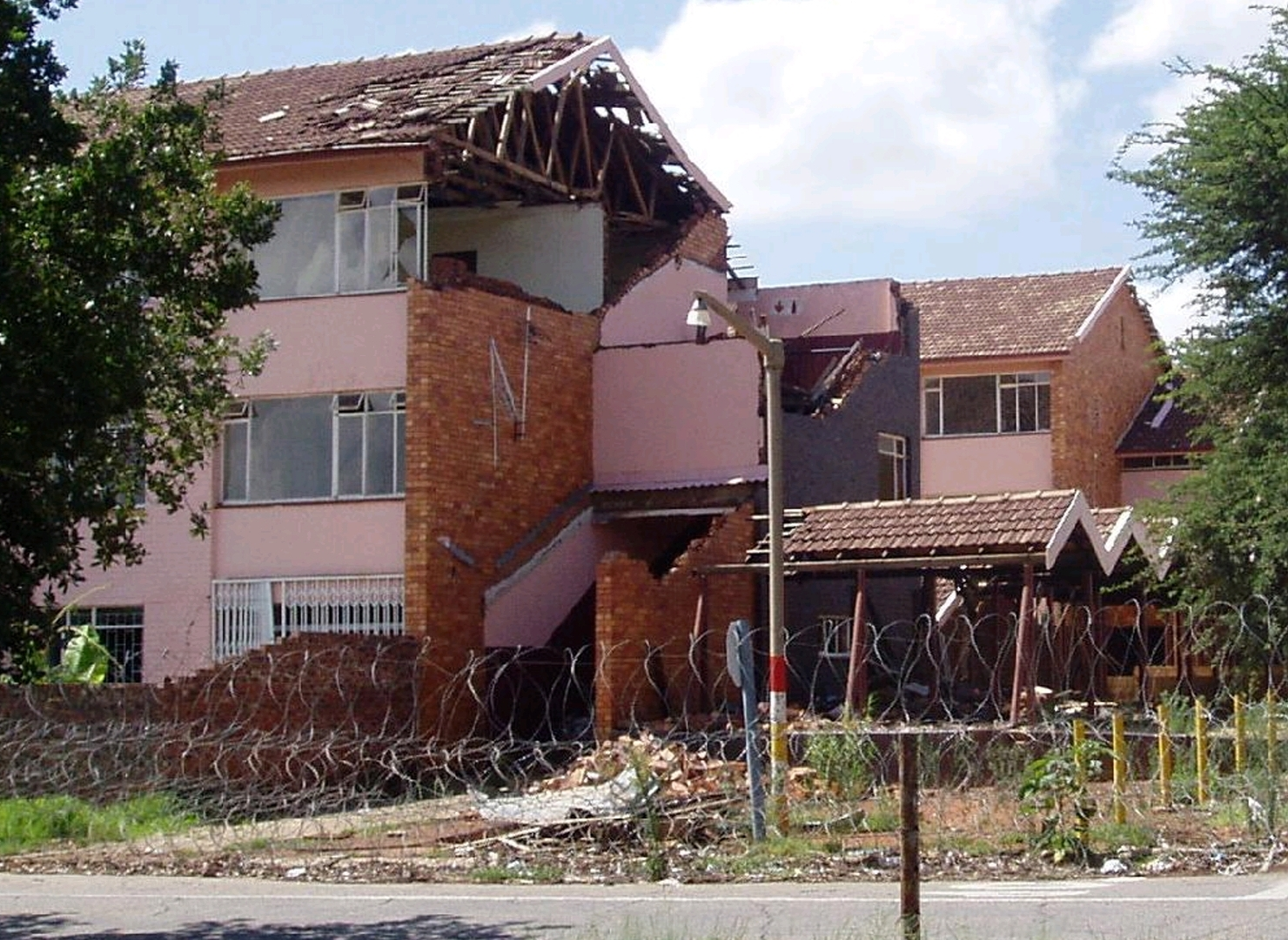
Damage in Stilfontein caused by the M L =5.3 tremor on 9 March 2005

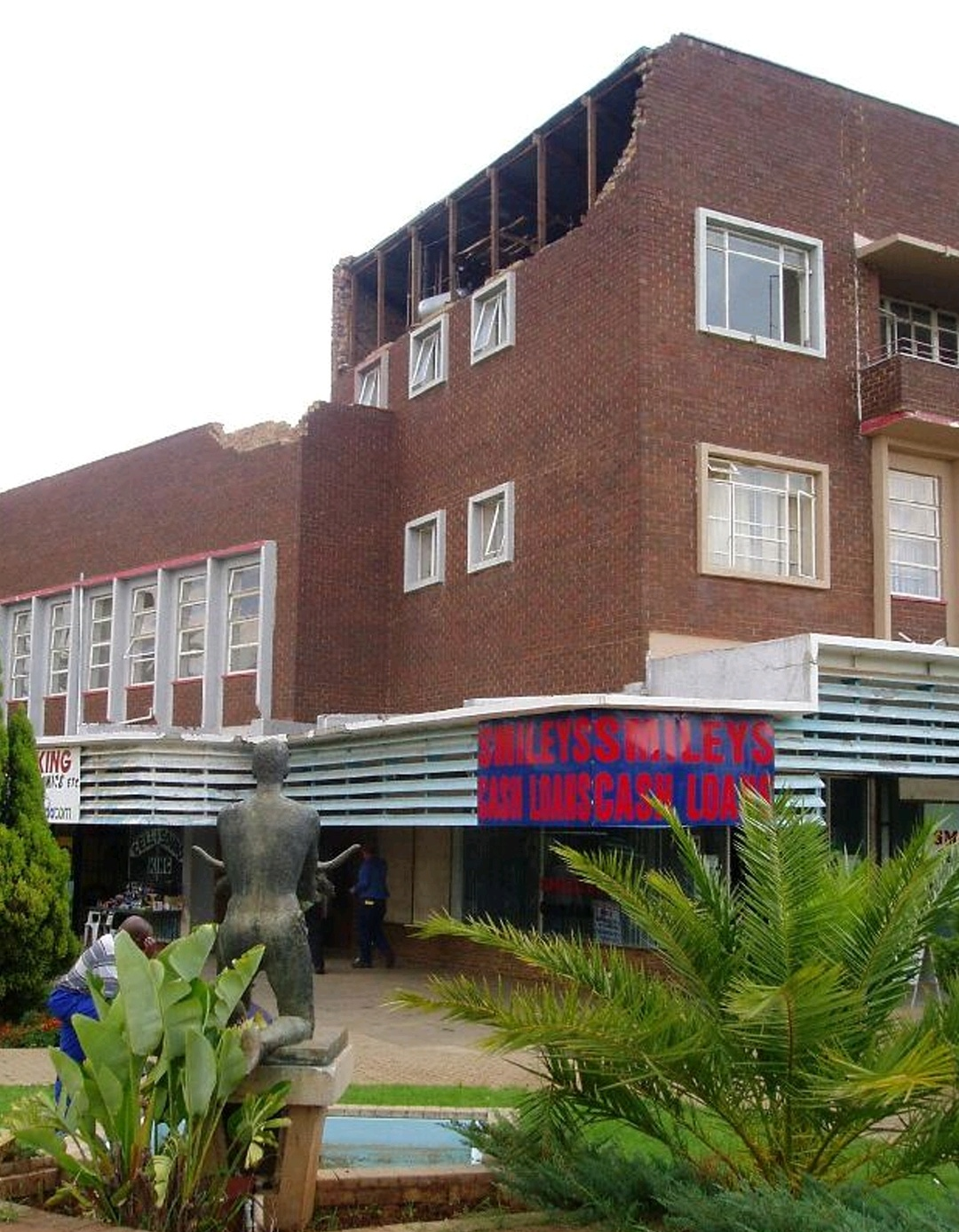
Civic centre damage in Stilfontein caused by the M L =5.3 tremor on 9 March 2005

Stilfontein was struck by a mining-related earthquake on 9 March 2005, which damaged buildings in the town, which was followed by the closure of the Hartebeesfontein and Buffelsfontein mines when the Stilfontein Gold Mining was handed over into liquidation. The Simmer and Jack Mines took over the mines but disaster struck again on 23 March 2006 when a fire trapped 8 miners underground at the Buffelsfontein mine.
