= Maquassi Hills Local Municipality =

Maquassi Hills
- Local municipality
- Seal

- Location in the North West
- Coordinates: 27°15′S 26°0′E
- Country: South Africa
- Province: North West
- District: Dr Kenneth Kaunda
- Seat: Wolmaransstad
- Wards: 11

Government
  - Type: Municipal council
  - Mayor: Zandisile Mweli

Area
  - Total: 4,643 km^{2} (1,793 sq mi)

Population (2011)
  - Total: 77,794
  - Density: 16.76/km^{2} (43.40/sq mi)

Racial makeup (2011)
  - Black African: 88.7%
  - Coloured: 2.3%
  - Indian/Asian: 0.4%
  - White: 8.2%

First languages (2011)
  - Tswana: 72.5%
  - Afrikaans: 10.7%
  - Sotho: 6.6%
  - Xhosa: 4.1%
  - Other: 6.1%
- Time zone: UTC+2 (SAST)
- Municipal code: NW404

Maquassi Hills Municipality (Tswana: Mmasepala wa Maquassi Hills; Afrikaans: Maquassi Hills Munisipaliteit) is a local municipality within the Dr Kenneth Kaunda District Municipality, in the North West province of South Africa.

== Main places ==
The 2001 census divided the municipality into the following main places:

Place	Code	Area (km^{2})	Population	Most spoken language
Kareeboom	62001	5.34	66	Tswana
Kgakala	62002	1.64	9,961	Tswana
Lebaleng	62003	0.98	8,417	Tswana
Leeudoringstad	62004	2.69	1,492	Afrikaans
Makwassie	62005	7.28	3,486	Tswana
Rulaganyang	62007	0.37	1,269	Tswana
Tswelelang	62008	2.29	20,101	Tswana
Witpoort	62009	17.78	374	Afrikaans
Wolmaransstad	62010	7.13	2,607	Afrikaans
Remainder of the municipality	62006	4,598.81	20,662	Tswana

== Politics ==
The municipal council consists of twenty-two members elected by mixed-member proportional representation. Eleven are elected by first-past-the-post voting in eleven wards, while the remaining eleven are chosen from party lists so that the total number of party representatives is proportional to the number of votes received.

In the election of 4 November 2026, no party won a majority. The African National Congress (ANC) won the largest number of seats, twelve.

The following table shows the results of the 2026 election.

Party	Ward			List			Total seats
Party	Votes	%	Seats	Votes	%	Seats	Total seats
African National Congress	12,011	54.44	10	11,786	53.90	2	12
Economic Freedom Fighters	4,119	18.67	0	4,247	19.42	4	4
Democratic Alliance	2,549	11.55	1	2,466	11.28	2	3
uMkhonto weSizwe Party	676	3.06	0	643	2.94	1	1
ActionSA	583	2.64	0	599	2.74	1	1
All Citizens Party	549	2.49	0	539	2.46	1	1
Independent candidates	32	0.15	0				0
9 other parties	1,542	6.99	0	1,587	7.26	0	0
Total	22,061	100.00	11	21,867	100.00	11	22
Valid votes	22,061	96.90		21,867	96.42		
Invalid/blank votes	706	3.10		813	3.58		
Total votes	22,767	100.00		22,680	100.00		
Registered voters/turnout	42,248	53.89		42,248	53.68		
