= City of Matlosana =

- Local municipality
- Seal

- Location in the North West
- Coordinates: 26°50′S 26°30′E
- Country: South Africa
- Province: North West
- District: Dr Kenneth Kaunda
- Seat: Klerksdorp
- Wards: 35

Government
  - Type: Municipal council
  - Mayor: Cllr Nonhlupheko Tsolela (ANC)

Area
  - Total: 3,561 km^{2} (1,375 sq mi)

Population (2022)
  - Total: 431,231
  - Density: 121.1/km^{2} (313.6/sq mi)

Racial makeup (2022)
  - Black African: 84.3%
  - Coloured: 2.9%
  - White: 12.6%

First languages (2011)
  - Tswana: 36.7%
  - Sotho: 20.3%
  - Afrikaans: 17.6%
  - Xhosa: 14.3%
  - Other: 11.1%
- Time zone: UTC+2 (SAST)
- Municipal code: NW403

The City of Matlosana (Tswana: Toropo ya Matlosana; Sotho: Toropo ya Matlosana; Afrikaans: Stad Matlosana; Xhosa: IsiXeko saseMatlosana), formerly the City Council of Klerksdorp, is a local municipality within the Dr Kenneth Kaunda District Municipality, in the North West province of South Africa.

== Main places ==
The 2001 census divided the municipality into the following main places:

Place	Code	Area (km^{2})	Population	Most spoken language
Buffelsfontein	61901	0.24	1,825	Sotho
Dominionville	61903	6.24	542	Afrikaans
Faan Meintjies Nature Reserve	61904	8.86	18	Xhosa
GTC Village	61905	0.41	445	Sotho
Hartebeesfontein	61906	3.72	1,275	Afrikaans
Hartebeestfontein Mine	61907	60.65	4,350	Sotho
Jouberton	61908	15.74	104,977	Tswana
Kanana	61909	9.90	66,936	Sotho
Khayalihle	61910	0.09	1,501	Xhosa
Khuma	61911	7.08	42,963	Tswana
Klerksdorp	61912	115.17	59,509	Afrikaans
Margaret Mine	61913	56.23	0	-
Orkney	61914	137.70	15,539	Afrikaans
Paballong Village	61915	0.24	516	Xhosa
Stilfontein Gold Mine	61917	0.32	470	Tswana
Stilfontein	61916	7.63	14,713	Afrikaans
Tigane	61918	1.21	12,111	Tswana
Vaal Reefs	61919	6.15	11,345	Xhosa
Remainder of the municipality	61902	3,125.09	20,194	Tswana

== Politics ==
The municipal council consists of seventy-seven members elected by mixed-member proportional representation. Thirty-nine councillors are elected by first-past-the-post voting in thirty-nine wards, while the remaining thirty-eight are chosen from party lists so that the total number of party representatives is proportional to the number of votes received.

In the election of 4 November 2026 the African National Congress (ANC) lost its majority, but remains the largest party, with thirty-two seats on the council.

The following table shows the results of the election.

Party	Ward			List			Total seats
Party	Votes	%	Seats	Votes	%	Seats	Total seats
African National Congress	39,126	41.15	30	39,073	41.18	2	32
Democratic Alliance	24,847	26.13	8	24,748	26.08	12	20
Economic Freedom Fighters	7,398	7.78	0	7,697	8.11	6	6
Freedom Front Plus	7,097	7.46	1	7,367	7.76	5	6
South African Communist Party	3,415	3.59	0	2,997	3.16	3	3
ActionSA	2,982	3.14	0	3,115	3.28	3	3
uMkhonto weSizwe Party	2,682	2.82	0	2,753	2.90	2	2
Matlosana Service Delivery Movement	1,386	1.46	0	1,810	1.91	1	1
Patriotic Alliance	1,405	1.48	0	1,392	1.47	1	1
Independent candidates	1,481	1.56	0				0
United Africans Transformation	598	0.63	0	805	0.85	1	1
All Citizens Party	578	0.61	0	502	0.53	1	1
People's Freedom Party	476	0.50	0	473	0.50	1	1
12 other parties	1,610	1.69	0	2,159	2.28	0	0
Total	95,081	100.00	39	94,891	100.00	38	77
Valid votes	95,081	97.84		94,891	97.75		
Invalid/blank votes	2,099	2.16		2,185	2.25		
Total votes	97,180	100.00		97,076	100.00		
Registered voters/turnout	202,310	48.04		202,310	47.98		

== Languages ==
The 2011 census indicated the following prevalence of languages in this municipality: 36.0% Setswana; 19.9% Sesotho; 17.3% Afrikaans; 14.0% IsiXhosa; 4.3% English; 2.1% IsiZulu; 1.2% Xitsonga ...
