= Amalia, South Africa =

Amalia
- Location within North West (South African province) Location within South Africa
- Coordinates: 27°14′53″S 25°2′45″E
- Country: South Africa
- Province: North West
- District: Dr Ruth Segomotsi Mompati
- Municipality: Mamusa

Area
  - Total: 2.35 km^{2} (0.91 sq mi)

Population (2011)
  - Total: 226
  - Density: 96.2/km^{2} (249/sq mi)

Racial makeup (2011)
  - Black African: 24.0%
  - Coloured: 5.8%
  - Indian/Asian: 2.2%
  - White: 67.6%
  - Other: 0.4%

First languages (2011)
  - Afrikaans: 74.3%
  - Tswana: 22.1%
  - English: 2.2%
  - Other: 1.3%
- Time zone: UTC+2 (SAST)
- Postal code (street): 2786
- PO box: 2786
- Area code: 053

Amalia is a town in Dr Ruth Segomotsi Mompati District Municipality in the North West province of South Africa.

The town was founded in 1927 and named for Amalia Faustmann, a well-known local church figure.
