= Leeudoringstad =

- Location within North West (South African province) Location within South Africa
- Coordinates: 27°14′S 26°14′E
- Country: South Africa
- Province: North West
- District: Dr Kenneth Kaunda
- Municipality: Maquassi Hills

Area
  - Total: 5.63 km^{2} (2.17 sq mi)

Population (2011)
  - Total: 5,054
  - Density: 898/km^{2} (2,330/sq mi)

Racial makeup (2011)
  - Black African: 77.4%
  - Coloured: 1.3%
  - Indian/Asian: 0.8%
  - White: 20.1%
  - Other: 0.4%

First languages (2011)
  - Tswana: 57.0%
  - Afrikaans: 21.8%
  - Sotho: 10.4%
  - Xhosa: 4.1%
  - Other: 6.6%
- Time zone: UTC+2 (SAST)
- Postal code (street): 2640
- PO box: 2640
- Area code: 018 581

Leeudoringstad (Afrikaans for Lion thorn city) is a small farming town situated on the main Cape Town - Johannesburg railway line in North West Province of South Africa.

== Origin ==
Leeudoringstad was established on the farm Rietkuil on the 6 December 1920 and named after the Lion-thorn, the African Devil's Claw (Harpagophytum procumbens).

=== Dynamite Disaster ===
The town hit the headlines on 17 July 1932 when a train carrying 320 to 330 tons (previously incorrectly stated as 1,200 tons) of dynamite from the De Beers factory at Somerset West to the Witwatersrand exploded and flattened the town. Five people were killed.

According to A.P. Cartwright's "The Dynamite Company", a goods train delivering explosives from the Cape Explosives Factory to the Rand, with thirty-one trucks was loaded with 10685 cases. Just outside the station, about 1 km down the track, the driver noticed a cloud of smoke coming from one of the trucks in the middle of the train. He immediately stopped the train and was about to get down from the foot plate when a series of explosions occurred. The driver and his fireman escaped unharmed and managed to uncouple the engine and take it into the station to warn the people there that there could possibly be more explosions.

A nearby farm house received the full blast and four people in there were killed instantly as well as most of the livestock.

The board of inquiry found that the initial fire was due to the trailing axle of the first dynamite truck had become hot and ignited the grease and oil in the axle box. What saved the driver and fireman was that by regulation there had to be three empty trucks between the engine and the first explosives truck.

The paper, "The Star" of July 18, 1932 carried extensive articles.

=== Agriculture ===
Today, Leeudoringstad hosts the headquarters of Suidwes Landbou, one of the largest agricultural companies in South Africa.
