= Schweizer-Reneke =

Schweizer-Reneke Mamusa "Mzwera"
- Location within North West (South African province) Location within South Africa
- Coordinates: 27°11′S 25°20′E
- Country: South Africa
- Province: North West
- District: Dr Ruth Segomotsi Mompati
- Municipality: Mamusa

Area
  - Total: 22.75 km^{2} (8.78 sq mi)

Population (2011)
  - Total: 41,226
  - Density: 1,812/km^{2} (4,693/sq mi)

Racial makeup (2011)
  - Black African: 92.5%
  - White: 4.3%
  - Coloured: 2.4%
  - Indian/Asian: 0.5%
  - Other: 0.5%

First languages (2011)
  - Tswana: 86.1%
  - Afrikaans: 5.8%
  - Sotho: 2.2%
  - English: 1.8%
  - Other: 4.1%
- Time zone: UTC+2 (SAST)
- Postal code (street): 2780
- Area code: 053

Schweizer-Reneke, sometimes referred to as Schweizer, is a town in the North West Province of South Africa. It is the administrative centre of Mamusa Local Municipality. It is commonly referred to as Schweizer/ Mzwera.

== History ==
Schweizer-Reneke was formerly part of the old Transvaal Republic. Founded on 1 October 1888, the town is situated on the banks of the Harts River, with six regional roads exiting the town. The town is named after Captain C.A. Schweizer and Field Cornet C.N. Reyneke. Both men distinguished themselves and were among the ten soldiers killed while storming the stronghold of the Khoekhoe Korana and their chief David Massouw on the nearby Mamusa Hill on 2 December 1885 during an action to put an end to cattle rustling in the area. The remains of the stone fortifications of Chief David Massouw can still be seen on Mamusa Hill.

== Economy ==
The principal crops of the region around Schweizer-Reneke are mainly maize, cotton, groundnuts, sunflower seeds and soybeans. In addition, cattle and sheep farming is practiced in the region on a relatively large scale on the grasslands where the soil is unsuitable for cultivation. Schweizer-Reneke is rich in diamond deposits. This led to large scale private diamond mining in the area.

Wenzel Dam, just north of the town on the Harts River, has been developed into a holiday resort but sadly is now in decay.

== Demographics ==
According to the 2011 census, the town of Schweizer-Reneke has a population of 41,226, of whom 2,376 live in the town centre while the rest live mostly in the adjacent township of Ipelegeng. 92.5% of the people in the urban area described themselves as "Black African", 4.3% as "White", 2.4% as "Coloured", and 0.5% as "Indian or Asian". 86.1% of the people in the urban area speak Tswana as their first language, while 5.8% speak Afrikaans, 2.2% speak Sotho and 1.8% speak English.

== Education ==
The town has public secondary schools:

- Hoërskool Schweizer Reneke
- Ipelegeng High School
- Itshupeng Secondary School
- Reabetswe Secondary School

It also has public primary schools:

- Laerskool Schweizer Reneke
- Kolong Primary School
- Ikgomotseng Primary School
- Kgatontle Primary School
- Tshwaraganelo Primary School
- Mamusa Primary School
- Charon Primary School
- Roshunville Primary School
- Richard Tumahole Lentsela Primary School

== Notable people ==
- Joyce Murray, South African Canadian politician
- Wynand Claassen, Springbok rugby captain
- Ahmed Kathrada, politician
- Elisabeth Eybers, poet
- Irma Stern, artist
- Essop Pahad, politician
- Pieter Labuschagne, rugby player

== Sport ==
Schweizer Reneke is home to a soccer club "Mamusa United FC" that plays in the provincial football league. There is also a big soccer team formed by the Department of Social Development: Mamusa Service Point. The team boasts with local popular players like Molwantwa Sheriff Lehihi, Kwenzekile Scova Mqweba and Peter Maiyane Kgalapa amongst others.

== See also ==
- Taung
- Ipelegeng
