= Wolmaransstad =

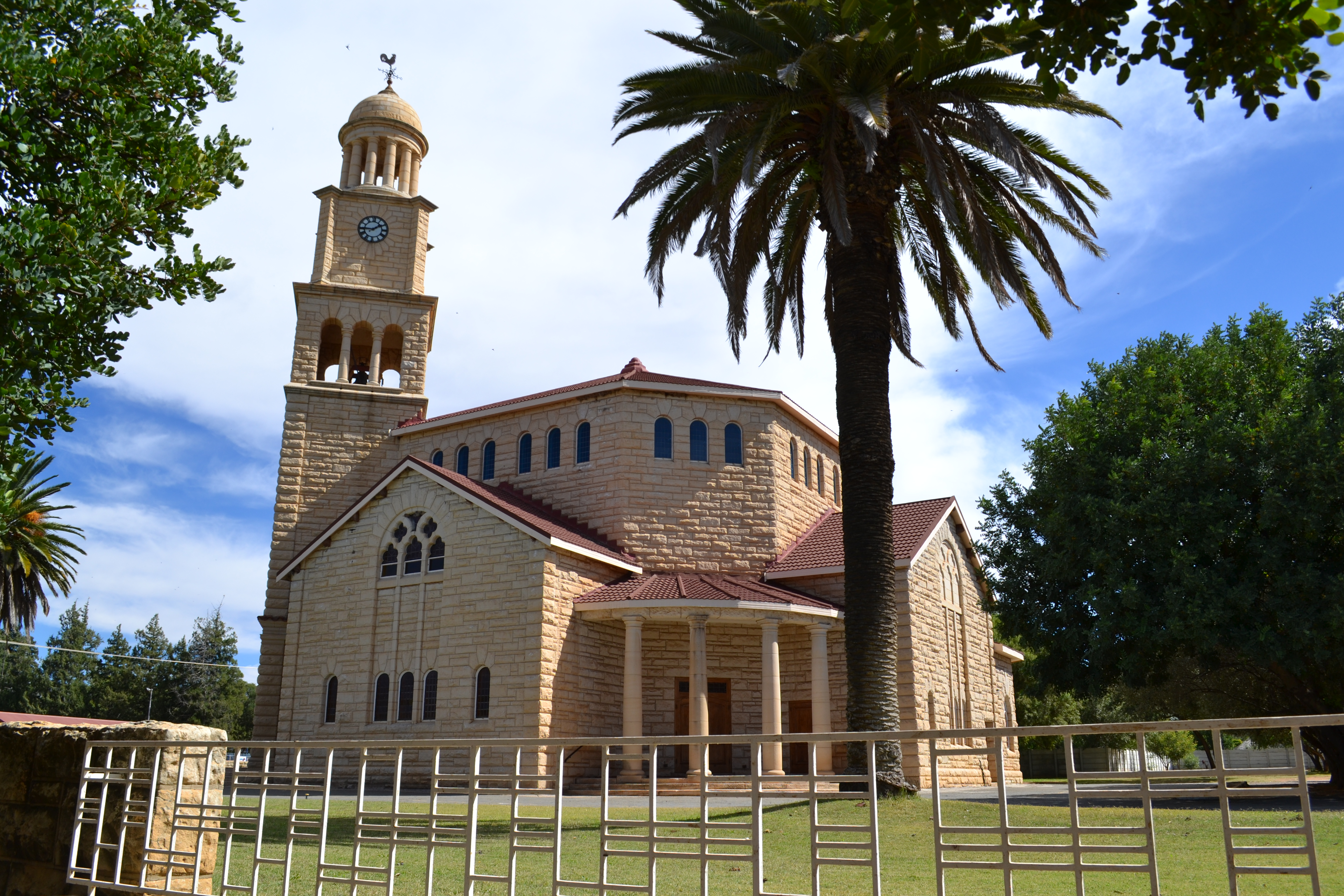
- DR Church in Wolmaransstad

- Location within North West (South African province) Location within South Africa
- Coordinates: 27°12′00″S 25°59′00″E
- Country: South Africa
- Province: North West
- District: Dr Kenneth Kaunda
- Municipality: Maquassi Hills

Area
  - Total: 41.68 km^{2} (16.09 sq mi)

Population (2011)
  - Total: 3,633
  - Density: 87.16/km^{2} (225.8/sq mi)

Racial makeup (2011)
  - Black African: 35.4%
  - Coloured: 2.6%
  - Indian/Asian: 2.8%
  - White: 57.4%
  - Other: 1.8%

First languages (2011)
  - Afrikaans: 71.6%
  - Tswana: 13.0%
  - English: 8.2%
  - Sotho: 2.5%
  - Other: 4.7%
- Time zone: UTC+2 (SAST)
- Postal code (street): 2630
- PO box: 2630
- Area code: 018

Wolmaransstad (Afrikaans for "Wolmarans City") is a maize-farming town situated on the N12 between Johannesburg and Kimberley in North West Province of South Africa. The town lies in an important alluvial diamond-mining area and it is the main town of the Maquassi Hills Local Municipality.

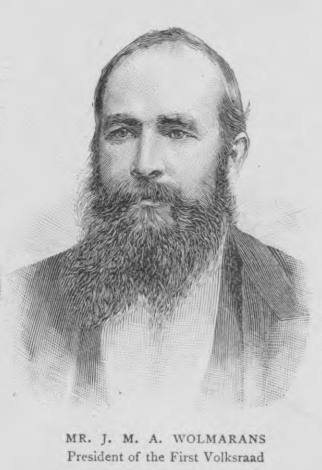
J.M.A. Wolmarans

Town 245 km south-west of Johannesburg and 56 km north-east of Bloemhof. It was laid out on the farms Rooderand and Vlakfontein in 1888, and proclaimed a town in 1891. Named after Jacobus M. A. Wolmarans, then member of the Executive Council.

Wolmaransstad originated in 1891 on the banks of the Makwasi River (San word for a type of wild spearmint) and takes its name from J. M. A. Wolmarans, a volksraad councilman.

Wolmaransstad serves a large community and is an important diamond buying center.

The Dutch Reformed Church building was designed by Gerard Moerdijk.

== Tourist attractions ==
- Broadbent Mission Station
- Digger's Diamond route
- Makwassierante Conservation Area
- Wolwespruit Dam Nature Reserve

== Notable native ==
- Bernardus Gerhardus Fourie (also known as Brand Fourie; 1916–2008), South African politician
- Abraham Erasmus van Wyk, plant taxonomist.

== See also ==
- Wolmaransstad Commando, a former light infantry regiment of the South African Army based in Wolmaransstad
