= List of cities and towns in the North West (South Africa) =

This is a list of cities and towns in the North West Province of South Africa.

In the case of settlements that have had their official names changed the traditional name is listed first followed by the new name.

== Dr Ruth Segomotsi Mompati District Municipality ==
- Amalia
- Bray
- Ganyesa
- Mareetsane
- Morokweng
- Motlhabeng
- Reivilo
- Schweizer-Reneke
- Setlagole
- Stella
- Taung
- Tosca
- Vryburg
- Setlopo

== Bojanala Platinum District Municipality ==
- Babelegi
- Beestekraal
- Brits
- Broederstroom
- Derby
- Hartbeespoort
- Hekpoort
- Jericho
- Kosmos
- Koster
- Kroondal
- Legogolwe
- Maanhaarrand
- Manamakgoteng
- Mmakau
- Mogwase
- Mooinooi
- Mathibestad
- Mononono
- Pella-Matlhako
- Ramokokastad
- Rooikoppies (Marikana)
- Rustenburg
- Skeerpoort
- Swartruggens
- Tsitsing

== Ngaka Modiri Molema District Municipality ==
- Biesiesvlei
- Coligny
- Delareyville
- Ganyesa
- Groot Marico
- Itsoseng
- Lichtenburg
- Mareetsane
- Mafeking (Mahikeng)
- Mmabatho
- Ottosdal
- Ottoshoop
- Sannieshof
- Welbedacht (Lehurutshe)
- Zeerust

== Dr Kenneth Kaunda District Municipality ==
- Bloemhof
- Christiana
- Hartbeesfontein (Lethabong)
- Klerksdorp
- Leeudoringstad
- Makwassie
- Orkney
- Potchefstroom
- Stilfontein
- Ventersdorp
- Wolmaransstad
