= Kagisano Local Municipality =

Coordinates: 26°25′S 24°0′E

- Local municipality
- Location in the North West
- Country: South Africa
- Province: North West
- District: Dr Ruth Segomotsi Mompati District
- Seat: Ganyesa

Area
  - Total: 11,354 km^{2} (4,384 sq mi)

Population (2001)
  - Total: 88,780
  - Density: 7.819/km^{2} (20.25/sq mi)
- Time zone: UTC+2 (SAST)
- Municipal code: NW391

Kagisano Local Municipality was a local municipality in Dr Ruth Segomotsi Mompati District Municipality, North West Province, South Africa, until the election of 18 May 2011, when it was merged with the Molopo Local Municipality to form the Kagisano-Molopo Local Municipality.

== Main places ==
The 2001 census divided the municipality into the following main places:

Place	Code	Area (km^{2})	Population	Most spoken language
Batlharo Ba Lotlhware	61101	8,084.80	59,209	Tswana
Louwna	61103	0.60	235	Tswana
Morokweng	61104	1,584.86	26,694	Tswana
Piet Plessis	61105	32.09	1,055	Tswana
Remainder of the municipality	61102	4,986.07	9,193	Tswana
