= Kagisano–Molopo Local Municipality elections =

Local elections in the North West Province, South Africa

The Kagisano–Molopo Local Municipality is a Local Municipality in the North West Province in South Africa. It was formed in 2011 by the merger of the Kagisano and Molopo Local Municipalities. The council consists of twenty-nine members elected by mixed-member proportional representation. Fifteen councillors are elected by first-past-the-post voting in fifteen wards, while the remaining fourteen are chosen from party lists so that the total number of party representatives is proportional to the number of votes received.

In the election of 4 November 2026 the African National Congress (ANC) won a majority of nineteen seats.

== Results ==
The following table shows the composition of the council after past elections.

Event	ANC	DA	EFF	UCDP	Other	Total
2011 election	24	2	—	2	2	30
2016 election	22	2	2	1	2	29
2021 election	20	2	4	1	2	29
2026 election	19	2	3	1	4	29

== May 2011 election ==
The following table shows the results of the 2011 election.

Party	Ward			List			Total seats
Party	Votes	%	Seats	Votes	%	Seats	Total seats
African National Congress	19,667	77.88	15	20,256	79.73	9	24
United Christian Democratic Party	2,207	8.74	0	2,112	8.31	2	2
Democratic Alliance	1,518	6.01	0	1,349	5.31	2	2
Congress of the People	775	3.07	0	777	3.06	1	1
African Christian Democratic Party	653	2.59	0	639	2.52	1	1
African People's Convention	245	0.97	0	274	1.08	0	0
Independent candidates	188	0.74	0				0
Total	25,253	100.00	15	25,407	100.00	15	30
Valid votes	25,253	97.10		25,407	97.48		
Invalid/blank votes	754	2.90		658	2.52		
Total votes	26,007	100.00		26,065	100.00		
Registered voters/turnout	49,264	52.79		49,264	52.91		

== August 2016 election ==
The following table shows the results of the 2016 election.

Party	Ward			List			Total seats
Party	Votes	%	Seats	Votes	%	Seats	Total seats
African National Congress	19,144	72.56	15	19,790	74.97	7	22
Democratic Alliance	1,943	7.36	0	1,980	7.50	2	2
Economic Freedom Fighters	1,871	7.09	0	1,882	7.13	2	2
Forum for Service Delivery	1,556	5.90	0	1,683	6.38	2	2
United Christian Democratic Party	735	2.79	0	796	3.02	1	1
Independent candidates	590	2.24	0				0
African Christian Democratic Party	195	0.74	0	266	1.01	0	0
Congress of the People	348	1.32	0				0
Total	26,382	100.00	15	26,397	100.00	14	29
Valid votes	26,382	96.12		26,397	96.02		
Invalid/blank votes	1,066	3.88		1,095	3.98		
Total votes	27,448	100.00		27,492	100.00		
Registered voters/turnout	53,288	51.51		53,288	51.59		

== November 2021 election ==
The following table shows the results of the 2021 election.

Party	Ward			List			Total seats
Party	Votes	%	Seats	Votes	%	Seats	Total seats
African National Congress	14,409	65.51	15	14,861	68.04	5	20
Economic Freedom Fighters	2,642	12.01	0	2,965	13.57	4	4
Azanian Independent Community Movement	883	4.01	0	1,377	6.30	2	2
Democratic Alliance	1,064	4.84	0	1,129	5.17	2	2
Independent candidates	1,770	8.05	0				0
United Christian Democratic Party	732	3.33	0	877	4.02	1	1
Forum for Service Delivery	237	1.08	0	407	1.86	0	0
Freedom Front Plus	258	1.17	0	226	1.03	0	0
Total	21,995	100.00	15	21,842	100.00	14	29
Valid votes	21,995	97.29		21,842	96.53		
Invalid/blank votes	612	2.71		784	3.47		
Total votes	22,607	100.00		22,626	100.00		
Registered voters/turnout	52,811	42.81		52,811	42.84		

== November 2026 election ==
The following table shows the results of the 2026 election.

Party	Ward			List			Total seats
Party	Votes	%	Seats	Votes	%	Seats	Total seats
African National Congress	16,577	63.52	15	16,649	63.61	4	19
Economic Freedom Fighters	2,171	8.32	0	2,277	8.70	3	3
South African Communist Party	1,891	7.25	0	1,619	6.19	2	2
Democratic Alliance	1,678	6.43	0	1,660	6.34	2	2
Reform Alliance of South Africa	1,022	3.92	0	972	3.71	1	1
United Christian Democratic Party	920	3.53	0	872	3.33	1	1
ActionSA	623	2.39	0	678	2.59	1	1
uMkhonto weSizwe Party	352	1.35	0	342	1.31	0	0
African Spear Movement	209	0.80	0	220	0.84	0	0
United Africans Transformation	177	0.68	0	229	0.87	0	0
Afrika Mayibuye Movement	174	0.67	0	140	0.53	0	0
African Congress for Transformation	78	0.30	0	122	0.47	0	0
African Christian Democratic Party	16	0.06	0	177	0.68	0	0
Inkatha Freedom Party	96	0.37	0	75	0.29	0	0
Patriotic Alliance	43	0.16	0	96	0.37	0	0
Active African Christians United Movement	69	0.26	0	47	0.18	0	0
Total	26,096	100.00	15	26,175	100.00	14	29
Valid votes	26,096	97.29		26,175	97.41		
Invalid/blank votes	727	2.71		696	2.59		
Total votes	26,823	100.00		26,871	100.00		
Registered voters/turnout	61,810	43.40		61,810	43.47		
