= R378 (South Africa) =

Regional route in South Africa

Regional route R378
- R378 route map

Location
- Country: South Africa

Highway system
- Numbered routes of South Africa
← R377	→ R380

The R378 is a Regional Route in South Africa that connects Vryburg with Bray, North West via Terra Firma.

Its north-western origin is the R375 at Bray. It heads roughly south-east, through Tosca to meet the south-eastern origin of the R379. The route maintains a south-easterly direction, through Crafthole and Ganyesa to end at Vryburg at the N14.
