= Manthe, North West =

Manthe
- Location within North West (South African province) Location within South Africa
- Coordinates: 27.549°S 24.892°E
- Country: South Africa
- Province: North West
- District: Dr Ruth Segomotsi Mompati
- Municipality: Greater Taung

Area
  - Total: 5.91 km^{2} (2.28 sq mi)

Population (2011)
  - Total: 4,090
  - Density: 692/km^{2} (1,790/sq mi)

Racial makeup (2011)
  - Black African: 99.2%
  - Coloured: 0.4%
  - Indian/Asian: 0.2%
  - White: 0.2%

First languages (2011)
  - Tswana: 93.9%
  - S. Ndebele: 1.9%
  - English: 1.5%
  - Zulu: 1.3%
  - Other: 1.5%
- Time zone: UTC+2 (SAST)

Manthe is a town in Dr Ruth Segomotsi Mompati District Municipality in the North West province of South Africa.
