= Utlwanang =

- Location within North West (South African province) Location within South Africa
- Coordinates: 27.8911°S 25.1258°E
- Country: South Africa
- Province: North West
- District: Dr Ruth Segomotsi Mompati
- Municipality: Lekwa-Teemane

Area
  - Total: 2.93 km^{2} (1.13 sq mi)

Population (2011)
  - Total: 14,169
  - Density: 4,840/km^{2} (12,500/sq mi)

Racial makeup (2011)
  - Black African: 97.2%
  - Coloured: 2.2%
  - Indian/Asian: 0.3%
  - White: 0.1%
  - Other: 0.2%

First languages (2011)
  - Tswana: 80.5%
  - Xhosa: 6.3%
  - Sotho: 3.4%
  - Afrikaans: 2.5%
  - Other: 7.3%
- Time zone: UTC+2 (SAST)
- Postal code (street): 2680
- PO box: 2680

Utlwanang is a township 4 km northwest of Christiana in Dr Ruth Segomotsi Mompati District Municipality in the North West province of South Africa.
