= Coverndale =

- Location within North West (South African province) Location within South Africa
- Coordinates: 27.6382°S 25.5898°E
- Country: South Africa
- Province: North West
- District: Dr Ruth Segomotsi Mompati
- Municipality: Lekwa-Teemane

Area
  - Total: 0.51 km^{2} (0.20 sq mi)

Population (2011)
  - Total: 2,410
  - Density: 4,700/km^{2} (12,000/sq mi)

Racial makeup (2011)
  - Black African: 32.1%
  - Coloured: 66.9%
  - Indian/Asian: 0.3%
  - White: 0.2%
  - Other: 0.5%

First languages (2011)
  - Tswana: 20.7%
  - Afrikaans: 74.3%
  - Sotho: 2.9%
  - Other: 2.0%
- Time zone: UTC+2 (SAST)
- Postal code (street): 2660
- PO box: 2660

Coverndale is a township near Bloemhof in Dr Ruth Segomotsi Mompati District Municipality in the North West province of South Africa.
