= Majeakgoro =

Majeakgoro itireleng
- Location within North West (South African province) Location within South Africa
- Coordinates: 27.792°S 24.643°E
- Country: South Africa
- Province: North West
- District: Dr Ruth Segomotsi Mompati
- Municipality: Greater Taung

Area
  - Total: 5.99 km^{2} (2.31 sq mi)

Population (2011)
  - Total: 5,076
  - Density: 847/km^{2} (2,190/sq mi)

Racial makeup (2011)
  - Black African: 99.5%
  - Coloured: 0.2%
  - Indian/Asian: 0.1%
  - Other: 0.1%

First languages (2011)
  - Tswana: 94.6%
  - English: 1.0%
  - Other: 4.4%
- Time zone: UTC+2 (SAST)

Majeakgoro is a town in Dr Ruth Segomotsi Mompati District Municipality in the North West province of South Africa. It is composed of two villages, Lower Majeakgoro and Upper Majeakgoro. It is under the leadership of a chief and tribal council.
