= Kameelputs =

- Location within North West (South African province) Location within South Africa
- Coordinates: 28.048°S 24.539°E
- Country: South Africa
- Province: North West
- District: Dr Ruth Segomotsi Mompati
- Municipality: Greater Taung

Area
  - Total: 2.12 km^{2} (0.82 sq mi)

Population (2011)
  - Total: 1,508
  - Density: 711/km^{2} (1,840/sq mi)

Racial makeup (2011)
  - Black African: 98.3%
  - Coloured: 1.0%
  - Indian/Asian: 0.5%
  - White: 0.1%
  - Other: 0.1%

First languages (2011)
  - Tswana: 81.0%
  - S. Ndebele: 3.9%
  - English: 2.7%
  - Sotho: 2.5%
  - Other: 9.8%
- Time zone: UTC+2 (SAST)

Kameelputs is a town in Greater Taung Local Municipality in the North West province of South Africa.
