= Pomfret, North West =

Pomfret
- Location within North West (South African province) Location within South Africa
- Coordinates: 25°49′S 23°32′E
- Country: South Africa
- Province: North West
- District: Dr Ruth Segomotsi Mompati
- Municipality: Kagisano/Molopo

Area
  - Total: 29.79 km^{2} (11.50 sq mi)

Population (2011)
  - Total: 1,939
  - Density: 65.09/km^{2} (168.6/sq mi)

Racial makeup (2011)
  - Black African: 97.7%
  - Coloured: 1.2%
  - Indian/Asian: 0.2%
  - White: 0.5%
  - Other: 0.4%

First languages (2011)
  - Tswana: 24.7%
  - English: 3.4%
  - Afrikaans: 2.0%
  - Other: 69.9%
- Time zone: UTC+2 (SAST)
- PO box: 8619
- Area code: 053

Pomfret is a desert town, (200 km outside Vryburg) the site of an old asbestos mine, on the edge of the Kalahari Desert in northwest South Africa. It was the administrative centre of Molopo Local Municipality before 18 May 2011, when the municipality merged with Kagisano to form the Kagisano–Molopo Local Municipality. Many of its inhabitants are former members of 32 Battalion, also known as Buffalo Battalion. These ex-soldiers were predominantly Portuguese-speaking Angolans who fought on the South African government side in Angola and Namibia, and after the end of the South African Border War to police the black townships. The community remains largely Portuguese-speaking.

== Present day ==
Today the town is described as depressing by those who visit. Injured 32 Battalion veterans of war live in squalid circumstances.

In 2004, 60 mercenaries from Pomfret were recruited to take part in an attempted coup against the government of Equatorial Guinea, known as the Wonga coup. They were jailed for one year for their suspected involvement.

A 2009 documentary film recorded South African mercenaries describing how Pomfret was a place to recruit cheap labor for mercenary activities.

== Asbestos mine in Pomfret ==
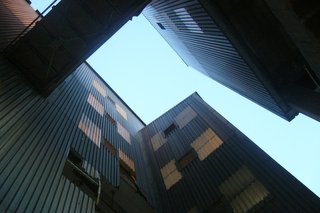
Asbestos mine

The presence of asbestos in the subsoil was the major reason for the creation of the town. Asbestos was mined and used in the motor industry for the making of brake pads, roofing, and water pipes. The mine is now closed, and is a tourist attraction.
