= R377 (South Africa) =

Regional route in South Africa

Regional route R377
- R377 route map

Location
- Country: South Africa

Highway system
- Numbered routes of South Africa
← R376	→ R378

The R377 is a Regional Route in South Africa that connects Delareyville with Vergeleë via Stella.

== Route ==
Its north-western terminus is the R375 at Vergeleë. It heads south east, through Piet Plessis to Stella, where it meets the N18 at a staggered junction. From Stella it heads east-south-east to its south-eastern terminus at the N14 just west of Delareyville.
