= Lekwa-Teemane Local Municipality elections =

Local elections in the North West Province, South Africa

The Lekwa-Teemane Local Municipality council consists of fourteen members elected by mixed-member proportional representation. Seven councillors are elected by first-past-the-post voting in seven wards, while the remaining seven are chosen from party lists so that the total number of party representatives is proportional to the number of votes received.

In the election of 4 November 2026 no party won a majority on the council, with the African National Congress (ANC) and Economic Freedom Fighters (EFF) both winning five seats.

== Results ==
The following table shows the composition of the council after past elections.

Event	ANC	DA	EFF	FSD	FF+	Other	Total
2000 election	8	0	—	—	0	3	11
2006 election	9	1	—	—	1	0	11
2011 election	10	3	—	—	0	1	14
2016 election	10	3	1	2	0	0	16
2021 election	7	1	4	1	1	0	14
2026 election	5	1	5	—	1	0	12

== December 2000 election ==
The following table shows the results of the 2000 election.

Party	Ward			List			Total seats
Party	Votes	%	Seats	Votes	%	Seats	Total seats
African National Congress	6,361	70.16	6	6,382	70.21	2	8
Noordwes Forum	1,279	14.11	0	1,089	11.98	2	2
Independent Civic Organisation of South Africa	651	7.18	0	598	6.58	1	1
Democratic Alliance	163	1.80	0	502	5.52	0	0
United Christian Democratic Party	326	3.60	0	274	3.01	0	0
Freedom Front Plus	287	3.17	0	245	2.70	0	0
Total	9,067	100.00	6	9,090	100.00	5	11
Valid votes	9,067	95.92		9,090	96.41		
Invalid/blank votes	386	4.08		338	3.59		
Total votes	9,453	100.00		9,428	100.00		
Registered voters/turnout	17,645	53.57		17,645	53.43		

== March 2006 election ==
The following table shows the results of the 2006 election.

Party	Ward			List			Total seats
Party	Votes	%	Seats	Votes	%	Seats	Total seats
African National Congress	7,494	78.24	6	7,577	79.82	3	9
Democratic Alliance	713	7.44	0	961	10.12	1	1
Independent candidates	769	8.03	0				0
Freedom Front Plus	240	2.51	0	405	4.27	1	1
United Christian Democratic Party	190	1.98	0	237	2.50	0	0
African Christian Democratic Party	108	1.13	0	158	1.66	0	0
Independent Democrats	64	0.67	0	155	1.63	0	0
Total	9,578	100.00	6	9,493	100.00	5	11
Valid votes	9,578	98.37		9,493	98.35		
Invalid/blank votes	159	1.63		159	1.65		
Total votes	9,737	100.00		9,652	100.00		
Registered voters/turnout	20,805	46.80		20,805	46.39		

== May 2011 election ==
The following table shows the results of the 2011 election.

Party	Ward			List			Total seats
Party	Votes	%	Seats	Votes	%	Seats	Total seats
African National Congress	9,098	71.30	6	9,216	72.20	4	10
Democratic Alliance	2,979	23.35	1	2,949	23.10	2	3
Congress of the People	298	2.34	0	251	1.97	1	1
Freedom Front Plus	219	1.72	0	161	1.26	0	0
Beter Bloemhof Party	166	1.30	0	188	1.47	0	0
Total	12,760	100.00	7	12,765	100.00	7	14
Valid votes	12,760	98.03		12,765	97.97		
Invalid/blank votes	257	1.97		265	2.03		
Total votes	13,017	100.00		13,030	100.00		
Registered voters/turnout	22,125	58.83		22,125	58.89		

== August 2016 election ==
The following table shows the results of the 2016 election.

Party	Ward			List			Total seats
Party	Votes	%	Seats	Votes	%	Seats	Total seats
African National Congress	8,457	63.35	7	8,310	62.18	3	10
Democratic Alliance	2,083	15.60	1	2,024	15.14	2	3
Forum for Service Delivery	1,079	8.08	0	1,284	9.61	2	2
Economic Freedom Fighters	1,170	8.76	0	1,098	8.22	1	1
Freedom Front Plus	267	2.00	0	295	2.21	0	0
Congress of the People	244	1.83	0	301	2.25	0	0
African Christian Democratic Party	49	0.37	0	53	0.40	0	0
Total	13,349	100.00	8	13,365	100.00	8	16
Valid votes	13,349	96.49		13,365	98.14		
Invalid/blank votes	485	3.51		253	1.86		
Total votes	13,834	100.00		13,618	100.00		
Registered voters/turnout	23,709	58.35		23,709	57.44		

== November 2021 election ==
The following table shows the results of the 2021 election.

Party	Ward			List			Total seats
Party	Votes	%	Seats	Votes	%	Seats	Total seats
African National Congress	5,364	47.83	5	5,334	48.52	2	7
Economic Freedom Fighters	2,597	23.16	1	2,659	24.19	3	4
Democratic Alliance	1,021	9.10	1	1,035	9.41	0	1
Freedom Front Plus	743	6.63	0	725	6.59	1	1
Forum for Service Delivery	651	5.80	0	667	6.07	1	1
Independent candidates	526	4.69	0				0
African Independent Congress	173	1.54	0	350	3.18	0	0
African Christian Democratic Party	71	0.63	0	69	0.63	0	0
Congress of the People	34	0.30	0	106	0.96	0	0
United Christian Democratic Party	35	0.31	0	49	0.45	0	0
Total	11,215	100.00	7	10,994	100.00	7	14
Valid votes	11,215	98.41		10,994	97.85		
Invalid/blank votes	181	1.59		242	2.15		
Total votes	11,396	100.00		11,236	100.00		
Registered voters/turnout	23,665	48.16		23,665	47.48		

== November 2026 election ==
The following table shows the results of the 2026 election.

Party	Ward			List			Total seats
Party	Votes	%	Seats	Votes	%	Seats	Total seats
African National Congress	5,593	34.98	2	5,617	34.99	3	5
Economic Freedom Fighters	5,275	32.99	4	5,284	32.91	1	5
Democratic Alliance	1,324	8.28	1	1,299	8.09	0	1
African Congress for Transformation	1,288	8.05	0	1,251	7.79	1	1
Freedom Front Plus	964	6.03	0	989	6.16	1	1
ActionSA	772	4.83	0	760	4.73	1	1
Lekwa Teemaneng Development Party	185	1.16	0	188	1.17	0	0
Patriotic Alliance	176	1.10	0	190	1.18	0	0
uMkhonto weSizwe Party	140	0.88	0	144	0.90	0	0
South African Communist Party	142	0.89	0	133	0.83	0	0
United Africans Transformation	97	0.61	0	158	0.98	0	0
Afrika Mayibuye Movement	35	0.22	0	42	0.26	0	0
Total	15,991	100.00	7	16,055	100.00	7	14
Valid votes	15,991	96.01		16,055	96.32		
Invalid/blank votes	665	3.99		613	3.68		
Total votes	16,656	100.00		16,668	100.00		
Registered voters/turnout	29,280	56.89		29,280	56.93		
