= Naledi Local Municipality, North West elections =

Local elections in the North West Province, South Africa

The Naledi Local Municipality council consists of eighteen members elected by mixed-member proportional representation. Nine councillors are elected by first-past-the-post voting in nine wards, while the remaining nine are chosen from party lists so that the total number of party representatives is proportional to the number of votes received.

In the election of 4 November 2026 the African National Congress (ANC) lost its majority, but remains the largest party with nine seats.

== Results ==
The following table shows the composition of the council after past elections.

Event	ANC	DA	EFF	FF+	UCDP	Other	Total
2000 election	12	3	—	—	3	0	18
2006 election	12	3	—	—	1	2	18
2011 election	12	5	—	0	—	1	18
2016 election	13	5	2	0	—	0	20
2021 election	10	3	3	1	—	1	18
2026 election	9	3	1	1	0	4	18

== December 2000 election ==
The following table shows the results of the 2000 election.

Party	Ward			List			Total seats
Party	Votes	%	Seats	Votes	%	Seats	Total seats
African National Congress	9,558	64.49	8	9,991	67.43	4	12
Democratic Alliance	2,399	16.19	1	2,494	16.83	2	3
United Christian Democratic Party	2,385	16.09	0	2,332	15.74	3	3
Independent candidates	479	3.23	0				0
Total	14,821	100.00	9	14,817	100.00	9	18
Valid votes	14,821	95.93		14,817	95.82		
Invalid/blank votes	629	4.07		647	4.18		
Total votes	15,450	100.00		15,464	100.00		
Registered voters/turnout	28,000	55.18		28,000	55.23		

== March 2006 election ==
The following table shows the results of the 2006 election.

Party	Ward			List			Total seats
Party	Votes	%	Seats	Votes	%	Seats	Total seats
African National Congress	7,761	61.25	6	10,736	72.32	6	12
Democratic Alliance	1,859	14.67	1	1,774	11.95	1	2
Independent Democrats	1,696	13.38	0	1,476	9.94	2	2
United Christian Democratic Party	420	3.31	1	474	3.19	0	1
Pan Africanist Congress of Azania	640	5.05	1	239	1.61	0	1
African Christian Democratic Party	296	2.34	0	147	0.99	0	0
Total	12,672	100.00	9	14,846	100.00	9	18
Valid votes	12,672	82.69		14,846	96.81		
Invalid/blank votes	2,652	17.31		489	3.19		
Total votes	15,324	100.00		15,335	100.00		
Registered voters/turnout	29,688	51.62		29,688	51.65		

== May 2011 election ==
The following table shows the results of the 2011 election.

Party	Ward			List			Total seats
Party	Votes	%	Seats	Votes	%	Seats	Total seats
African National Congress	11,161	67.56	8	11,422	69.45	4	12
Democratic Alliance	4,342	26.28	1	4,346	26.43	4	5
Congress of the People	560	3.39	0	465	2.83	1	1
African Christian Democratic Party	142	0.86	0	105	0.64	0	0
Freedom Front Plus	128	0.77	0	108	0.66	0	0
Independent candidates	186	1.13	0				0
Total	16,519	100.00	9	16,446	100.00	9	18
Valid votes	16,519	97.42		16,446	97.30		
Invalid/blank votes	437	2.58		457	2.70		
Total votes	16,956	100.00		16,903	100.00		
Registered voters/turnout	29,767	56.96		29,767	56.78		

== August 2016 election ==
The following table shows the results of the 2016 election.

Party	Ward			List			Total seats
Party	Votes	%	Seats	Votes	%	Seats	Total seats
African National Congress	11,325	63.96	9	11,272	63.87	4	13
Democratic Alliance	4,127	23.31	1	4,073	23.08	4	5
Economic Freedom Fighters	1,496	8.45	0	1,508	8.54	2	2
Freedom Front Plus	371	2.10	0	359	2.03	0	0
Congress of the People	197	1.11	0	341	1.93	0	0
Pan Africanist Congress of Azania	101	0.57	0	96	0.54	0	0
Independent candidates	88	0.50	0				0
Total	17,705	100.00	10	17,649	100.00	10	20
Valid votes	17,705	98.08		17,649	97.71		
Invalid/blank votes	346	1.92		414	2.29		
Total votes	18,051	100.00		18,063	100.00		
Registered voters/turnout	32,259	55.96		32,259	55.99		

== November 2021 election ==
The following table shows the results of the 2021 election.

Party	Ward			List			Total seats
Party	Votes	%	Seats	Votes	%	Seats	Total seats
African National Congress	7,154	53.57	8	7,374	54.07	2	10
Democratic Alliance	2,265	16.96	1	2,287	16.77	2	3
Economic Freedom Fighters	2,177	16.30	0	2,220	16.28	3	3
Freedom Front Plus	631	4.72	0	606	4.44	1	1
Azanian Independent Community Movement	444	3.32	0	446	3.27	1	1
Patriotic Alliance	204	1.53	0	233	1.71	0	0
Forum for Service Delivery	148	1.11	0	140	1.03	0	0
Independent candidates	190	1.42	0				0
African Independent Congress				177	1.30	0	0
Congress of the People	81	0.61	0	73	0.54	0	0
United Christian Democratic Party	60	0.45	0	60	0.44	0	0
African Transformation Movement	1	0.01	0	21	0.15	0	0
Total	13,355	100.00	9	13,637	100.00	9	18
Valid votes	13,355	96.94		13,637	96.94		
Invalid/blank votes	421	3.06		431	3.06		
Total votes	13,776	100.00		14,068	100.00		
Registered voters/turnout	31,845	43.26		31,845	44.18		

=== By-elections from November 2021 ===
The following by-elections were held to fill vacant ward seats in the period from November 2021.

Date	Ward	Party of the previous councillor	Party of the newly elected councillor
11 Sep 2024	7	Democratic Alliance	Democratic Alliance

== November 2026 election ==
The following table shows the results of the 2026 election.

Party	Ward			List			Total seats
Party	Votes	%	Seats	Votes	%	Seats	Total seats
African National Congress	8,312	44.75	8	8,667	49.35	1	9
Democratic Alliance	2,604	14.02	1	2,730	15.55	2	3
Batho Pele Community Association	1,333	7.18	0	1,354	7.71	1	1
Economic Freedom Fighters	1,107	5.96	0	1,209	6.88	1	1
Independent candidates	1,889	10.17	0				0
Freedom Front Plus	816	4.39	0	834	4.75	1	1
Patriotic Alliance	514	2.77	0	513	2.92	1	1
Afrika Mayibuye Movement	433	2.33	0	454	2.59	1	1
ActionSA	399	2.15	0	465	2.65	1	1
South African Communist Party	383	2.06	0	362	2.06	0	0
uMkhonto weSizwe Party	303	1.63	0	328	1.87	0	0
United Africans Transformation	164	0.88	0	210	1.20	0	0
African Congress for Transformation	122	0.66	0	156	0.89	0	0
African Spear Movement	42	0.23	0	94	0.54	0	0
Pan Africanist Congress of Azania	66	0.36	0	69	0.39	0	0
United Christian Democratic Party	58	0.31	0	73	0.42	0	0
Active African Christians United Movement	31	0.17	0	43	0.24	0	0
Total	18,576	100.00	9	17,561	100.00	9	18
Valid votes	18,576	94.20		17,561	91.94		
Invalid/blank votes	1,144	5.80		1,539	8.06		
Total votes	19,720	100.00		19,100	100.00		
Registered voters/turnout	37,629	52.41		37,629	50.76		
