= Greater Taung Local Municipality elections =

Local elections in the North West Province, South Africa

The Greater Taung Local Municipality council consists of forty-seven members elected by mixed-member proportional representation. Twenty-four councillors are elected by first-past-the-post voting in twenty-four wards, while the remaining twenty-three are chosen from party lists so that the total number of party representatives is proportional to the number of votes received.

In the election of 4 November 2026 the African National Congress (ANC) retained its majority, winning twenty-four seats.

== Results ==
The following table shows the composition of the council after past elections.

Event	ACDP	AIC	ANC	COPE	DA	EFF	FSD	UCDP	Other	Total
2000 election	1	—	29	—	1	—	—	9	0	40
2006 election	1	—	35	—	1	—	—	5	2	44
2011 election	1	—	43	2	3	—	—	—	2	51
2016 election	1	1	34	1	2	6	3	—	0	48
2021 election	1	1	28	0	1	11	2	0	4	48
2026 election	0	1	24	—	3	7	—	0	12	47

== December 2000 election ==
The following table shows the results of the 2000 election.

Party	Ward			List			Total seats
Party	Votes	%	Seats	Votes	%	Seats	Total seats
African National Congress	24,691	73.77	19	26,560	74.79	10	29
United Christian Democratic Party	7,594	22.69	1	7,286	20.52	8	9
African Christian Democratic Party	781	2.33	0	833	2.35	1	1
Democratic Alliance	402	1.20	0	832	2.34	1	1
Total	33,468	100.00	20	35,511	100.00	20	40
Valid votes	33,468	96.99		35,511	97.18		
Invalid/blank votes	1,037	3.01		1,031	2.82		
Total votes	34,505	100.00		36,542	100.00		
Registered voters/turnout	70,667	48.83		70,667	51.71		

== March 2006 election ==
The following table shows the results of the 2006 election.

Party	Ward			List			Total seats
Party	Votes	%	Seats	Votes	%	Seats	Total seats
African National Congress	33,216	74.97	21	35,514	81.19	14	35
United Christian Democratic Party	5,066	11.43	0	5,820	13.30	5	5
Independent candidates	3,270	7.38	1				1
Independent Democrats	1,589	3.59	0	987	2.26	1	1
Democratic Alliance	655	1.48	0	638	1.46	1	1
African Christian Democratic Party	508	1.15	0	784	1.79	1	1
Total	44,304	100.00	22	43,743	100.00	22	44
Valid votes	44,304	97.34		43,743	95.89		
Invalid/blank votes	1,212	2.66		1,877	4.11		
Total votes	45,516	100.00		45,620	100.00		
Registered voters/turnout	85,939	52.96		85,939	53.08		

== May 2011 election ==
The following table shows the results of the 2011 election.

Party	Ward			List			Total seats
Party	Votes	%	Seats	Votes	%	Seats	Total seats
African National Congress	36,368	81.46	24	38,014	85.33	19	43
Democratic Alliance	2,918	6.54	1	2,803	6.29	2	3
Congress of the People	1,427	3.20	0	1,979	4.44	2	2
Independent candidates	2,631	5.89	1				1
African Christian Democratic Party	1,006	2.25	0	1,034	2.32	1	1
African People's Convention	297	0.67	0	719	1.61	1	1
Total	44,647	100.00	26	44,549	100.00	25	51
Valid votes	44,647	97.16		44,549	96.51		
Invalid/blank votes	1,306	2.84		1,610	3.49		
Total votes	45,953	100.00		46,159	100.00		
Registered voters/turnout	86,151	53.34		86,151	53.58		

== August 2016 election ==
The following table shows the results of the 2016 election.

Party	Ward			List			Total seats
Party	Votes	%	Seats	Votes	%	Seats	Total seats
African National Congress	30,696	62.62	24	31,836	67.14	10	34
Economic Freedom Fighters	5,516	11.25	0	6,311	13.31	6	6
Independent candidates	6,636	13.54	0				0
Forum for Service Delivery	2,796	5.70	0	3,570	7.53	3	3
Democratic Alliance	1,777	3.62	0	1,978	4.17	2	2
African Independent Congress	305	0.62	0	1,673	3.53	1	1
Congress of the People	482	0.98	0	857	1.81	1	1
African Christian Democratic Party	376	0.77	0	570	1.20	1	1
African People's Convention	165	0.34	0	369	0.78	0	0
Christian Democratic Party	273	0.56	0	253	0.53	0	0
Total	49,022	100.00	24	47,417	100.00	24	48
Valid votes	49,022	96.82		47,417	95.54		
Invalid/blank votes	1,610	3.18		2,216	4.46		
Total votes	50,632	100.00		49,633	100.00		
Registered voters/turnout	89,546	56.54		89,546	55.43		

== November 2021 election ==
The following table shows the results of the 2021 election.

Party	Ward			List			Total seats
Party	Votes	%	Seats	Votes	%	Seats	Total seats
African National Congress	23,392	56.42	23	23,528	58.03	5	28
Economic Freedom Fighters	9,491	22.89	0	9,532	23.51	11	11
Azanian Independent Community Movement	1,612	3.89	0	1,546	3.81	2	2
Forum for Service Delivery	1,580	3.81	1	1,563	3.85	1	2
Independent candidates	2,128	5.13	0				0
Democratic Alliance	953	2.30	0	953	2.35	1	1
African Independent Congress	265	0.64	0	846	2.09	1	1
African Christian Democratic Party	395	0.95	0	380	0.94	1	1
National Freedom Party	361	0.87	0	408	1.01	1	1
Patriotic Alliance	335	0.81	0	375	0.92	1	1
African Transformation Movement	161	0.39	0	513	1.27	0	0
United Democratic Movement	334	0.81	0	308	0.76	0	0
United Christian Democratic Party	306	0.74	0	326	0.80	0	0
Congress of the People	145	0.35	0	269	0.66	0	0
Total	41,458	100.00	24	40,547	100.00	24	48
Valid votes	41,458	97.63		40,547	96.04		
Invalid/blank votes	1,005	2.37		1,671	3.96		
Total votes	42,463	100.00		42,218	100.00		
Registered voters/turnout	87,198	48.70		87,198	48.42		

== November 2026 election ==
The following table shows the results of the 2026 election.

Party	Ward			List			Total seats
Party	Votes	%	Seats	Votes	%	Seats	Total seats
African National Congress	23,321	45.45	24	23,829	46.71	0	24
Economic Freedom Fighters	8,560	16.68	0	8,727	17.11	7	7
ActionSA	4,027	7.85	0	4,258	8.35	4	4
South African Communist Party	3,981	7.76	0	3,883	7.61	3	3
Democratic Alliance	3,636	7.09	0	3,683	7.22	3	3
Active Citizenry Taung Association	890	1.73	0	903	1.77	1	1
African Congress for Transformation	847	1.65	0	869	1.70	1	1
Patriotic Alliance	787	1.53	0	785	1.54	1	1
Alliance for Social Equity	878	1.71	0	655	1.28	1	1
African Independent Congress	747	1.46	0	498	0.98	1	1
uMkhonto weSizwe Party	530	1.03	0	618	1.21	1	1
United Africans Transformation	501	0.98	0	575	1.13	0	0
Independent candidates	984	1.92	0				0
United Christian Democratic Party	345	0.67	0	369	0.72	0	0
African Movement Congress	356	0.69	0	340	0.67	0	0
African Christian Democratic Party	274	0.53	0	295	0.58	0	0
Labour Party	284	0.55	0	234	0.46	0	0
Freedom Front Plus	168	0.33	0	218	0.43	0	0
Afrika Mayibuye Movement	115	0.22	0	106	0.21	0	0
Azanian Independent Community Movement	31	0.06	0	59	0.12	0	0
Active African Christians United Movement	45	0.09	0	42	0.08	0	0
Pan Africanist Congress of Azania				74	0.15	0	0
Total	51,307	100.00	24	51,020	100.00	23	47
Valid votes	51,307	96.87		51,020	96.64		
Invalid/blank votes	1,656	3.13		1,773	3.36		
Total votes	52,963	100.00		52,793	100.00		
Registered voters/turnout	99,716	53.11		99,716	52.94		
