= Jacobsdal =

Jacobsdal, Free State
- Location within Free State (South African province) Location within South Africa
- Coordinates: 29°7′42″S 24°46′30″E
- Country: South Africa
- Province: Free State
- District: Xhariep
- Municipality: Letsemeng
- Established: 1859

Area
  - Total: 60.5 km^{2} (23.4 sq mi)

Population (2011)
  - Total: 3,504
  - Density: 57.9/km^{2} (150/sq mi)

Racial makeup (2011)
  - Black African: 65.9%
  - Coloured: 26.7%
  - Indian/Asian: 0.3%
  - White: 6.6%
  - Other: 0.5%

First languages (2011)
  - Afrikaans: 90.4%
  - Sotho: 3.4%
  - Tswana: 2.9%
  - English: 1.3%
  - Other: 2.1%
- Time zone: UTC+2 (SAST)
- Postal code (street): 8710
- PO box: 8710
- Area code: 053

Jacobsdal is a small farming town in the Free State province of South Africa with various crops under irrigation, such as grapes, potatoes, lucerne, and groundnuts. The town was laid out in 1859 by Christoffel Jacobs on his farm Kalkfontein, and the population was 3,504 in 2011.

== Early history ==
It is a small attractive town on the Riet River, and in the 19th century it was near the boundary between the Orange Free State and the Cape Colony. Its district boundaries date back to 1834 when the Cape Colony negotiated with the Griqua Captain, Andries Waterboer. The town was established in 1859 on the farm Kalkfontein, 'lime spring'. The town was named after the farm's owner, Christoffel Johannes Jacobs. It obtained municipal status in 1860. At that time, the Jacobsdal district was one of the largest districts in the Orange Free State republic.

== Diamonds ==
In 1867 when diamonds were discovered in South Africa, the most important alluvial diamond diggings were in the Jacobsdal district. After the discovery, the Cape Colony claimed the largest part of the Jacobsdal district. However, in 1871 the Orange Free State republic's government received £90 000 from the British Crown in compensation for the land taken.

== Military action ==
Jacobsdal saw plenty of military action during the Second Anglo-Boer War of 1899–1902 because it was close to the two strategic towns of Kimberley and Mafeking. The wounded from the battles of Belmont/Graspan, Modder River, Magersfontein and Paardeberg were nursed in the town. The local hotel, known as the Garfield Hotel then, and owned by Mrs. Sarah Ann Streak, provided board and lodging to the Transvaal and Free State Ambulance, as well as Despatch riders.

In November 1899, Boers from Jacobsdal erected a cairn of a heap of stones (klipstapel), each burgher scratching his name on a stone, before departing for the battle of Roodelaagte.

20 km north west of Jacobsdal lies the Magersfontein battlefield where in December 1899 General Piet Cronjé blocked Lord Methuen's advance on Kimberley.

However, two months later, General Cronje was outflanked by his enemy General French's dash to relieve the siege of Kimberley, and retreated to Jacobsdal from Kimberley. On 15 February 1900 as the British approached the town he departed from Jacobsdal with 5000 men, women and children. Later that day the British captured the town, making Jacobsdal the first Orange Free State town to be occupied. Major General WAVELL and his British Troops occupied the Garfield Hotel in the town in February and March 1900 causing damage to the roof due to its use for Heliographing and flagsignalling between 16 February and 5 March 1900.

Two days later, Cronje's men came under fire at Paardeberg Drift from French who was in pursuit of him and the battle of Paardeberg commenced. Cronje surrendered on 27 February after enduring 9 days of shelling by 40,000 British troops. 4,000 Boers surrendered and were taken off into exile at British prisoner-of-war camps around the world.

During the British occupation, the occupiers were surprised by an attack by the Boers that resulted in the death of 23 British soldiers. The British retaliated by burning down twenty houses and interning all the town's women and children in a concentration camp in Kimberley. The men were sent to POW camps inside and outside South Africa. Later in 1900 the British erected a blockhouse near the town on the road to Paardeberg. Its rectangular shape is one of only 12 blockhouses with that shape in South Africa.

Besides the cairn, there are other memorials to the war in Jacobsdal. A memorial to the dead from the Battle of Roodelaagte stands in front of the NG church. In 1968, a memorial was erected in the Jacobsdal cemetery which commemorates British and colonial men who were buried in the cemetery.

The town has long had a well known Landbouskool, one of only three agricultural high schools in the province.

During the Second World War, Italian prisoners of war were held near Jacobsdal and Koffiefontein. Their labour was used to construct the Riet River Irrigation Scheme which extended the existing water scheme. After the war, white war veterans were rewarded with the receipt of an irrigation plot of 24 morgen each.

== Agriculture ==
The irrigation scheme is an extensive river irrigation settlement using water canals and the main crops are lucerne, potatoes, wheat, cotton, groundnuts, olives, maize and, since 1972, both table and wine grapes. The town claims to have the first wine cellar ever built outside the Cape Province. Wines of a good quality are produced by two wine cellars, Landzicht and Wilreza. In terms of livestock the focus is on sheep but there are also recently established large dairy establishments.

== Notable people ==
- Eric Louw - South African diplomat and politician
