= Letsemeng Local Municipality =

Coordinates: 29°25′11″S 25°00′19″E

Letsemeng
- Local municipality
- Seal

- Location in the Free State
- Country: South Africa
- Province: Free State
- District: Xhariep
- Seat: Koffiefontein
- Wards: 6

Government
  - Type: Municipal council
  - Mayor: Thandiwe Reachable

Area
  - Total: 9,829 km^{2} (3,795 sq mi)

Population (2022)
  - Total: 43,101
  - Density: 4.385/km^{2} (11.36/sq mi)

Racial makeup (2022)
  - Black African: 66.7%
  - Coloured: 23.2%
  - Indian/Asian: 0.6%
  - White: 9.1%

First languages (2011)
  - Afrikaans: 63.7%
  - Sotho: 12.4%
  - Xhosa: 10.8%
  - Tswana: 9.7%
  - Other: 3.4%
- Time zone: UTC+2 (SAST)
- Municipal code: FS161

Letsemeng Municipality (Afrikaans: Letsemeng Munisipaliteit; Sotho: Masepala wa Letsemeng; Xhosa: uMasipala wase Letsemeng) is a local municipality within the Xhariep District Municipality, in the Free State province of South Africa.

== Main places ==
The 2001 census divided the municipality into the following main places:

Place	Code	Area (km^{2})	Population	Most spoken language
Boitumelong	40101	0.24	330	Afrikaans
Bolokanang	40102	0.92	6,343	Tswana
Diamant Hoogte	40103	0.11	1,208	Afrikaans
Ditlhake	40104	2.21	8,727	Afrikaans
Jacobsdal	40105	2.25	1,709	Afrikaans
Koffiefontein	40106	33.79	1,443	Afrikaans
Luckhoff	40108	30.38	2,388	Afrikaans
Oppermans	40109	0.26	1,167	Afrikaans
Petrusburg	40110	1.99	588	Afrikaans
Ratanang	40111	0.62	4,852	Afrikaans
Relebohile	40112	0.15	671	Afrikaans
Remainder of the municipality	40107	10,155.00	13,533	Afrikaans

== Politics ==
The municipal council consists of thirteen members elected by mixed-member proportional representation. Seven councillors are elected by first-past-the-post voting in seven wards, while the remaining six are chosen from party lists so that the total number of party representatives is proportional to the number of votes received.

In the election of 4 November 2026 the African National Congress (ANC) won a majority of eight seats on the council.

The following table shows the results of the 2026 election.

Party	Ward			List			Total seats
Party	Votes	%	Seats	Votes	%	Seats	Total seats
African National Congress	6,920	60.53	7	6,950	60.77	1	8
Democratic Alliance	2,372	20.75	0	2,471	21.61	3	3
Freedom Front Plus	896	7.84	0	882	7.71	1	1
Economic Freedom Fighters	796	6.96	0	830	7.26	1	1
Independent candidates	135	1.18	0				0
5 other parties	313	2.74	0	304	2.66	0	0
Total	11,432	100.00	7	11,437	100.00	6	13
Valid votes	11,432	98.47		11,437	98.07		
Invalid/blank votes	178	1.53		225	1.93		
Total votes	11,610	100.00		11,662	100.00		
Registered voters/turnout	21,246	54.65		21,246	54.89		

== Corruption ==
In August 2025, the ANC Provincial Executive Committee resolved to fire all its leaders in the underperforming local municipalities to address governance failures, corruption, and service delivery challenges ahead of the 2026 local elections. Letsemeng was one of those municipalities affected after years of wasteful expenditures and irregular expenses.
