= Piet Plessis =

- Location within North West (South African province) Location within South Africa
- Coordinates: 26°10′S 24°25′E
- Country: South Africa
- Province: North West
- District: Dr Ruth Segomotsi Mompati
- Municipality: Kagisano/Molopo

Area
  - Total: 13.65 km^{2} (5.27 sq mi)

Population (2011)
  - Total: 1,655
  - Density: 121.2/km^{2} (314.0/sq mi)

Racial makeup (2011)
  - Black African: 95.8%
  - Coloured: 1.8%
  - Indian/Asian: 0.2%
  - White: 2.2%
  - Other: 0.1%

First languages (2011)
  - Tswana: 91.5%
  - Afrikaans: 4.1%
  - English: 2.1%
  - Zulu: 1.1%
  - Other: 1.2%
- Time zone: UTC+2 (SAST)
- PO box: 8621
- Area code: 053

Piet Plessis is a small town in the North West Province of South Africa. It lies adjacent to rural road R377. The nearest larger city, and business hub, is Vryburg which is about 90 kilometres (56 mi) to the south. The Botswana border lies approximately 30 kilometres (19 mi) north of Piet Plessis. It was founded in 1839 by a group of Trekboers led by Piet Plessis of Laingsburg, Western Cape. From 1969 it was the site of a MGM-29 Sergeant Ballistic Missile battery of the SADF, co located with three Infantry Companies of the 5 SAI, a Medium Artillery battery, and an SAAF Forward Radar and Signals Squadron.
