= Taung =

Town in North West Province, South Africa

- Location within North West (South African province) Location within South Africa
- Coordinates: 27°33′45″S 24°44′53″E
- Country: South Africa
- Province: North West
- District: Dr Ruth Segomotsi Mompati
- Municipality: Greater Taung

Area
  - Total: 20.75 km^{2} (8.01 sq mi)

Population (2011)
  - Total: 18,289
  - Density: 881.4/km^{2} (2,283/sq mi)

Racial makeup (2011)
  - Black African: 98.8%
  - Coloured: 0.4%
  - Indian/Asian: 0.5%
  - White: 0.1%
  - Other: 0.2%

First languages (2011)
  - Tswana: 89.6%
  - Xhosa: 2.8%
  - English: 1.5%
  - Sotho: 1.1%
  - Other: 5.0%
- Time zone: UTC+2 (SAST)
- Postal code (street): 8584
- PO box: 8584
- Area code: 053

UNESCO World Heritage Site
- Official name: Taung Skull Fossil Site
- Part of: Fossil Hominid Sites of South Africa
- Criteria: Cultural: (iii)(vi)
- Reference: 915bis-003
- Inscription: 1999 (23rd Session)
- Extensions: 2005
- Area: 158.7429 ha (392.262 acres)
- Buffer zone: 3,387 ha (8,370 acres)
- Coordinates: 27°37′10″S 24°37′59″E

Taung is a small town situated in the North West Province of South Africa. The name means place of the lion and was named after Tau, the King of the Barolong people King Tau wa Thibela. Tau is the Tswana word for lion.

== Taung skull fossil site ==
In 1924, a skull (later named the Taung Child) was discovered by a quarry-worker in the nearby Buxton-limestone quarry. It was described by Raymond Dart in 1925 as the type specimen of Australopithecus africanus after he received a shipment of mostly fossil baboons, but also containing the skull and face of the child. Surprisingly, it would be many years before Dart would visit Taung to determine the exact location of the find. By that time, lime-mining had destroyed much of the area. Later in-situ excavations were conducted under the direction of Phillip Tobias and Jeffrey McKee of the University of the Witwatersrand, who worked at the site from approximately 1989 until 1993. Although they failed to find additional hominid specimens, they did recover many important fossil baboons and increased the understanding of the Taung geology and taphonomy significantly.

Unlike the dolomitic caves near Johannesburg, South Africa and the site of Makapansgat, the Taung fossil sites are found in caves formed in a gigantic tufa flow coming off the dolomitic bedrock of the Kalahari escarpment.

The Taung Child is among the most important early human fossils ever discovered. It was the first hominid to be discovered in Africa, a species later named Australopithecus africanus, supporting Charles Darwin's concepts that the closest living relatives of humans are the African apes. It furthermore demonstrated significant differences between reality and the fake skull of a proposed human ancestor from England known as the Piltdown Man or Eoanthropus. The little skull is hypothesized to be from an approximately three- to three-and-a-half-year-old child. The cast of the brain is preserved by the filling of the skull with limestone breccia. The skull is housed at the University of the Witwatersrand in Johannesburg, South Africa.

The Taung Child was at first proposed to have been killed by other hominids as part of Raymond Dart's Osteo-Dento-Keratic Culture hypothesis. However, later work by C.K. "Bob" Brain demonstrated that the child was probably killed by some sort of mammalian carnivore such as a leopard. Recently, however, studies of the associated baboons by Ron Clarke and Lee Berger, and identification of specific marks on the Taung Child skull have demonstrated that the Taung Child may have been killed and eaten by a large bird of prey.

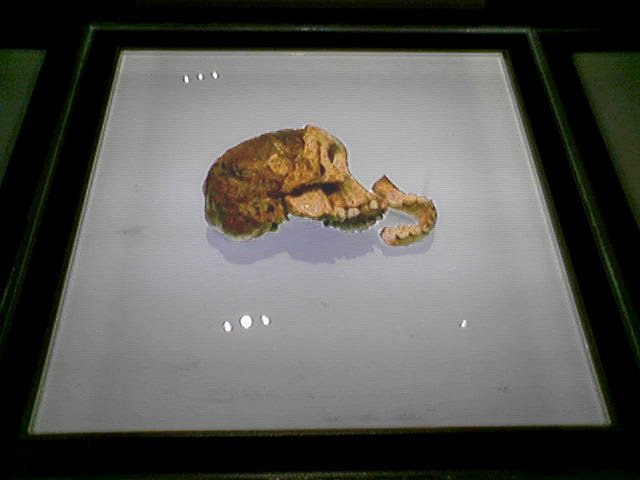
The Taung Child skull as seen when it was exhibited at the Maropeng visitor's centre at the Cradle of Humankind in early 2007

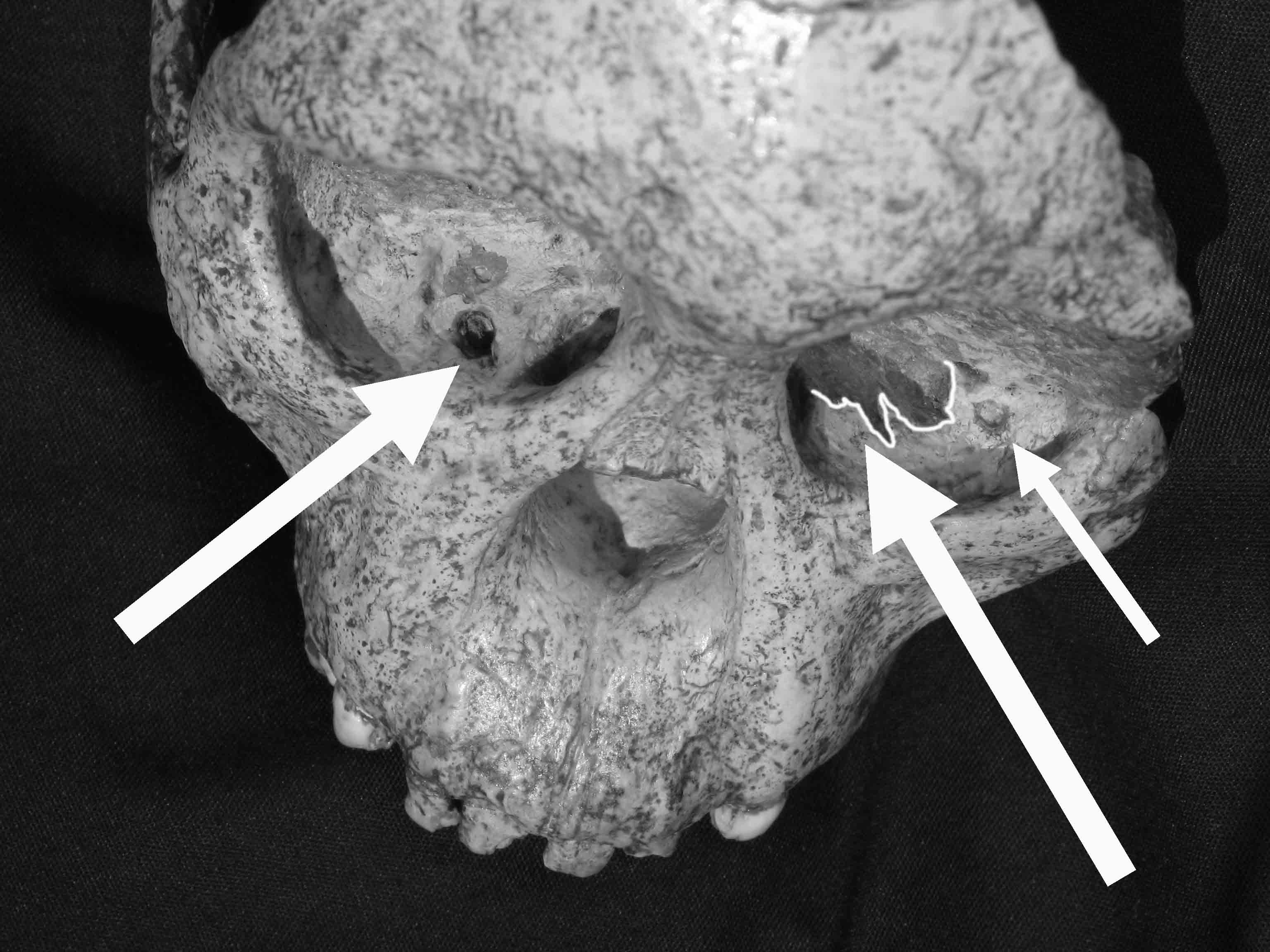
The Taung Child skull with arrows pointing to possible Eagle-caused damage

== Climate ==
Climate data for Taung, elevation 1,100 m (3,600 ft), (1991–2020 normals, extremes 1998–2023)
Month	Jan	Feb	Mar	Apr	May	Jun	Jul	Aug	Sep	Oct	Nov	Dec	Year
Record high °C (°F)	44.6 (112.3)	40.1 (104.2)	38.1 (100.6)	35.3 (95.5)	33.8 (92.8)	30.3 (86.5)	29.0 (84.2)	33.2 (91.8)	37.0 (98.6)	40.1 (104.2)	40.1 (104.2)	43.5 (110.3)	44.6 (112.3)
Mean daily maximum °C (°F)	34.7 (94.5)	33.2 (91.8)	31.8 (89.2)	28.5 (83.3)	25.7 (78.3)	22.9 (73.2)	22.9 (73.2)	26.1 (79.0)	30.0 (86.0)	32.8 (91.0)	33.3 (91.9)	35.0 (95.0)	29.7 (85.5)
Daily mean °C (°F)	26.3 (79.3)	25.4 (77.7)	23.5 (74.3)	19.8 (67.6)	16.0 (60.8)	12.5 (54.5)	12.3 (54.1)	15.3 (59.5)	19.2 (66.6)	22.8 (73.0)	24.0 (75.2)	26.3 (79.3)	20.3 (68.5)
Mean daily minimum °C (°F)	18.0 (64.4)	17.6 (63.7)	15.2 (59.4)	11.0 (51.8)	6.2 (43.2)	2.1 (35.8)	1.8 (35.2)	4.4 (39.9)	8.4 (47.1)	12.8 (55.0)	14.6 (58.3)	17.5 (63.5)	10.8 (51.4)
Record low °C (°F)	8.4 (47.1)	8.3 (46.9)	3.8 (38.8)	0.0 (32.0)	−4.6 (23.7)	−6.2 (20.8)	−6.4 (20.5)	−4.5 (23.9)	−2.2 (28.0)	1.5 (34.7)	4.4 (39.9)	9.9 (49.8)	−6.4 (20.5)
Average precipitation mm (inches)	77.5 (3.05)	74.2 (2.92)	77.1 (3.04)	35.4 (1.39)	12.5 (0.49)	5.5 (0.22)	3.9 (0.15)	5.8 (0.23)	12.8 (0.50)	25.6 (1.01)	45.1 (1.78)	60.0 (2.36)	435.4 (17.14)
Average precipitation days (≥ 1.0 mm)	5.9	5.3	5.5	2.9	1.3	0.5	0.6	0.6	1.0	2.5	3.7	4.5	34.3
Source: Starlings Roost Weather (precipitation 1898–2023)

== See also ==
- Hominids
- Cradle of Humankind
- List of human evolution fossils
- North West Cultural Calabash

== Sources ==
- P.V. Tobias, Dart Taung and the Missing Link (Inst. for the Study of Man in Africa, 1984)
- L.R. Berger and B. Hilton-Barber, In the Footsteps of Eve (National Geographic Press, 2001)
- L.R. Berger and B. Hilton-Barber, Field Guide to the Cradle of Humankind (Struik, 2001)
- L.R. Berger Am. J.Phys. Anth. 131:166-168 (2006)
