= Tosca, North West =

Tosca
- Location within North West (South African province) Location within South Africa
- Coordinates: 25.880°S 23.959°E
- Country: South Africa
- Province: North West
- District: Dr Ruth Segomotsi Mompati
- Municipality: Kagisano/Molopo

Racial makeup (2011)
  - Black African: 97.9%
  - Coloured: 0.8%
  - Indian/Asian: 0.3%
  - White: 0.5%
  - Other: 0.5%

First languages (2011)
  - Tswana: 96.4%
  - Afrikaans: 1.5%
  - English: 0.6%
  - Other: 1.5%
- Time zone: UTC+2 (SAST)
- PO box: 8618
- Area code: 053

Tosca is a town in Kagisano/Molopo Local Municipality in the North West province of South Africa.

It was formerly the seat of the Molopo Local Municipality, until it was amalgamated to form the Kagisano-Molopo Local Municipality in 2011. Tosca is privately owned.
