= R375 (South Africa) =

Regional route in South Africa

Regional route R375
- R375 route map

Location
- Country: South Africa

Highway system
- Numbered routes of South Africa
← R374	→ R376

The R375 is a Regional Route in South Africa that connects the northern corner of North West Province, along the Botswana border, with Sannieshof.

Its western origin is west of Vorstershoop, where the R376 reaches the border and changes direction to head north-north-east following the contours of the Molopo River and the Botswana. The route is paralleled by Botswana's A20 initially. The R375 follows the curves of the border to eventually run east-south-east. Its first intersection is with the R378's northern-western terminus at Bray. It continues in the same direction, and the next intersection is with the R377's north-west terminus. From just before this intersection, the route leaves the border slightly, while maintaining its east-south-east direction. The next intersection is with the north-western terminus of the R376. It then crosses the N18 before ending at the N14 at Sannieshof.
