= Boitumelong =

- Location within North West (South African province) Location within South Africa
- Coordinates: 27.640°S 25.570°E
- Country: South Africa
- Province: North West
- District: Dr Ruth Segomotsi Mompati
- Municipality: Lekwa-Teemane

Area
  - Total: 3.08 km^{2} (1.19 sq mi)

Population (2011)
  - Total: 23,155
  - Density: 7,520/km^{2} (19,500/sq mi)

Racial makeup (2011)
  - Black African: 95.1%
  - Coloured: 3.8%
  - Indian/Asian: 0.4%
  - White: 0.4%
  - Other: 0.4%

First languages (2011)
  - Tswana: 75.2%
  - Sotho: 7.9%
  - Xhosa: 7.6%
  - Afrikaans: 3.2%
  - Other: 6.1%
- Time zone: UTC+2 (SAST)
- PO box: 2662

Boitumelong is a town in Dr Ruth Segomotsi Mompati District Municipality in the North West province of South Africa.

Township 5 km from Bloemhof, on the farm Klipfontein No HO 344. Tswana, meaning ‘place of happiness’, from the fact that the residents were happy to move to the new township. since after 1994 people who were living in the nearby farms started to flock to Boitumelong for permanent residence, just before the name Boitumelong, there were people living nearby in a small residence named Makweteng those were people whom already moved out of their respective farms and ready to be given a permission to move in Boitumelong. Boitumelong since then has started expanding and is divided into 12 sections and still developing and some of the Big businesses has found their place of business near the location and it boost the economy of Bloemhof and nearby farms also contributes in developing and helping to stabilize the economy of Bloemhof and Boitumelong.
