= Louwna =

- Location within North West (South African province) Location within South Africa
- Coordinates: 26.903°S 24.151°E
- Country: South Africa
- Province: North West
- District: Dr Ruth Segomotsi Mompati
- Municipality: Kagisano/Molopo

Area
  - Total: 0.69 km^{2} (0.27 sq mi)

Population (2011)
  - Total: 305
  - Density: 440/km^{2} (1,100/sq mi)

Racial makeup (2011)
  - Black African: 80.7%
  - Coloured: 3.0%
  - White: 15.4%
  - Other: 1.0%

First languages (2011)
  - Tswana: 81.6%
  - Afrikaans: 14.5%
  - English: 2.6%
  - Other: 1.3%
- Time zone: UTC+2 (SAST)
- PO box: 8610

Louwna is a small village in Dr Ruth Segomotsi Mompati District Municipality in the North West province of South Africa.
