= North West Cultural Calabash =

The North West Cultural Calabash is a youth based arts festival held annually in the village of Lokaleng, greater Taung, North West Province, South Africa.

It was initiated by Hendrik Baird in 1994 as a celebration of cultures and coincided with the democratic elections in the country. The name symbolises the African tradition of using a Calabash as a means of feeding people. By putting the various South African cultures in a melting pot, it was hoped that a new culture would emerge to feed the nation.

The Cultural Calabash started as a one-day event and soon found a sponsor in the Transnet Foundation, the country's transport parastatel. This sponsorship enabled the Calabash to grow and bear fruit. Soon the North West Provincial Government in the Department of Sport, Arts and Culture came on board as a funder, enabling the event to prosper and grow.

The Cultural Calabash is a unique arts festival in that it sets out to discover new talent. Through a series of Provincial auditions held at local municipal level, amateur and semi-professional artists are identified in drama, dance and music. The winners in each category take part in four District Previews, where only the best are selected to participate at the Main Festival held traditionally during the last week-end of Space.

From its humble beginnings, the Calabash has grown to encompass twenty two auditions, four District Previews and a four-day main Festival.

Professional artists like Louis Mhlanga (jazz), Zola (kwaito) and others draw thousands of people to the rural village of Taung in search of entertainment and fun.

Being a youth based event, it does not promote alcohol, but strives to give its participants and audience a healthy alternative, at the same time promoting safe-sex practices in a country ravaged with HIV/Aids.

The Calabash is a project of the Mmabana Arts, Culture and Sport Foundation.

The Calabash is currently not presented by the Mmabana Foundation after Transnet stopped its funding.
