= Kagisano–Molopo Local Municipality =

Kagisano–Molopo
- Local municipality
- Location in the North West
- Coordinates: 26°S 24°E
- Country: South Africa
- Province: North West
- District: Dr Ruth Segomotsi Mompati
- Seat: Ganyesa
- Wards: 15

Government
  - Type: Municipal council
  - Mayor: Ontlametse Mochware (ANC)

Area
  - Total: 23,827 km^{2} (9,200 sq mi)

Population (2011)
  - Total: 105,789
  - Density: 4.4399/km^{2} (11.499/sq mi)

Racial makeup (2011)
  - Black African: 96.0%
  - Coloured: 1.4%
  - Indian/Asian: 0.2%
  - White: 2.1%

First languages (2011)
  - Tswana: 90.3%
  - Afrikaans: 3.4%
  - English: 1.6%
  - Other: 4.7%
- Time zone: UTC+2 (SAST)
- Municipal code: NW397

Kagisano–Molopo Municipality (Tswana: Mmasepala wa Kagisano–Molopo, pronounced [kaχiˈsanʊ mʊˈlʊpʊ]) is a local municipality within the Dr Ruth Segomotsi Mompati District Municipality, in the North West province of South Africa. It was created at the local government elections of 18 May 2011 by merging the Kagisano and Molopo municipalities.

== Geography ==
Kagisano–Molopo covers an area of 23,827 square kilometres (9,200 sq mi) in the north-western corner of the North West province. It borders on the Kgalagadi District of the Republic of Botswana to the north, Moshaweng Local Municipality in the Northern Cape province to the south-west, Greater Taung Local Municipality to the south, Naledi Local Municipality to the south-east, and Ratlou Local Municipality to the east. The main towns in the municipality are Ganyesa, Pomfret, Morokweng and Piet Plessis.

== Demographics ==
According to the 2011 census, the municipality has a population of 105,789. The majority of this population, 96.0%, described themselves as "Black African"; there are small minorities of those who describe themselves as "White" (2.1%) and "Coloured" (1.4%). 90.3% of the population speak Setswana as a first language, while 3.4% speak Afrikaans and 1.6% speak English.

== Politics ==
The municipal council consists of twenty-nine members elected by mixed-member proportional representation. Fifteen councillors are elected by first-past-the-post voting in fifteen wards, while the remaining fourteen are chosen from party lists so that the total number of party representatives is proportional to the number of votes received.

In the election of 4 November 2026 the African National Congress (ANC) won a majority of nineteen seats.

The following table shows the results of the 2026 election.

Party	Ward			List			Total seats
Party	Votes	%	Seats	Votes	%	Seats	Total seats
African National Congress	16,577	63.52	15	16,649	63.61	4	19
Economic Freedom Fighters	2,171	8.32	0	2,277	8.70	3	3
South African Communist Party	1,891	7.25	0	1,619	6.19	2	2
Democratic Alliance	1,678	6.43	0	1,660	6.34	2	2
Reform Alliance of South Africa	1,022	3.92	0	972	3.71	1	1
United Christian Democratic Party	920	3.53	0	872	3.33	1	1
ActionSA	623	2.39	0	678	2.59	1	1
9 other parties	1,214	4.65	0	1,448	5.53	0	0
Total	26,096	100.00	15	26,175	100.00	14	29
Valid votes	26,096	97.29		26,175	97.41		
Invalid/blank votes	727	2.71		696	2.59		
Total votes	26,823	100.00		26,871	100.00		
Registered voters/turnout	61,810	43.40		61,810	43.47		

== Main places ==
The 2001 census divided the municipality into the following main places:

Place	Code	Area (km^{2})	Population	Most spoken language
Batlharo Ba Lotlhware	61101	8,084.80	59,209	Tswana
Louwna	61103	0.60	235	Tswana
Morokweng	61104	1,584.86	26,694	Tswana
Piet Plessis	61105	32.09	1,055	Tswana
Pomfret	61502	2.58	3,241	Other
Remainder of the municipality	61102 + 61501	17,571.91	17,642	Tswana
