= Tithonian =

Third and last age of the late Jurassic

- 149.2 ± 0.7 – 143.1 ± 0.6 Ma
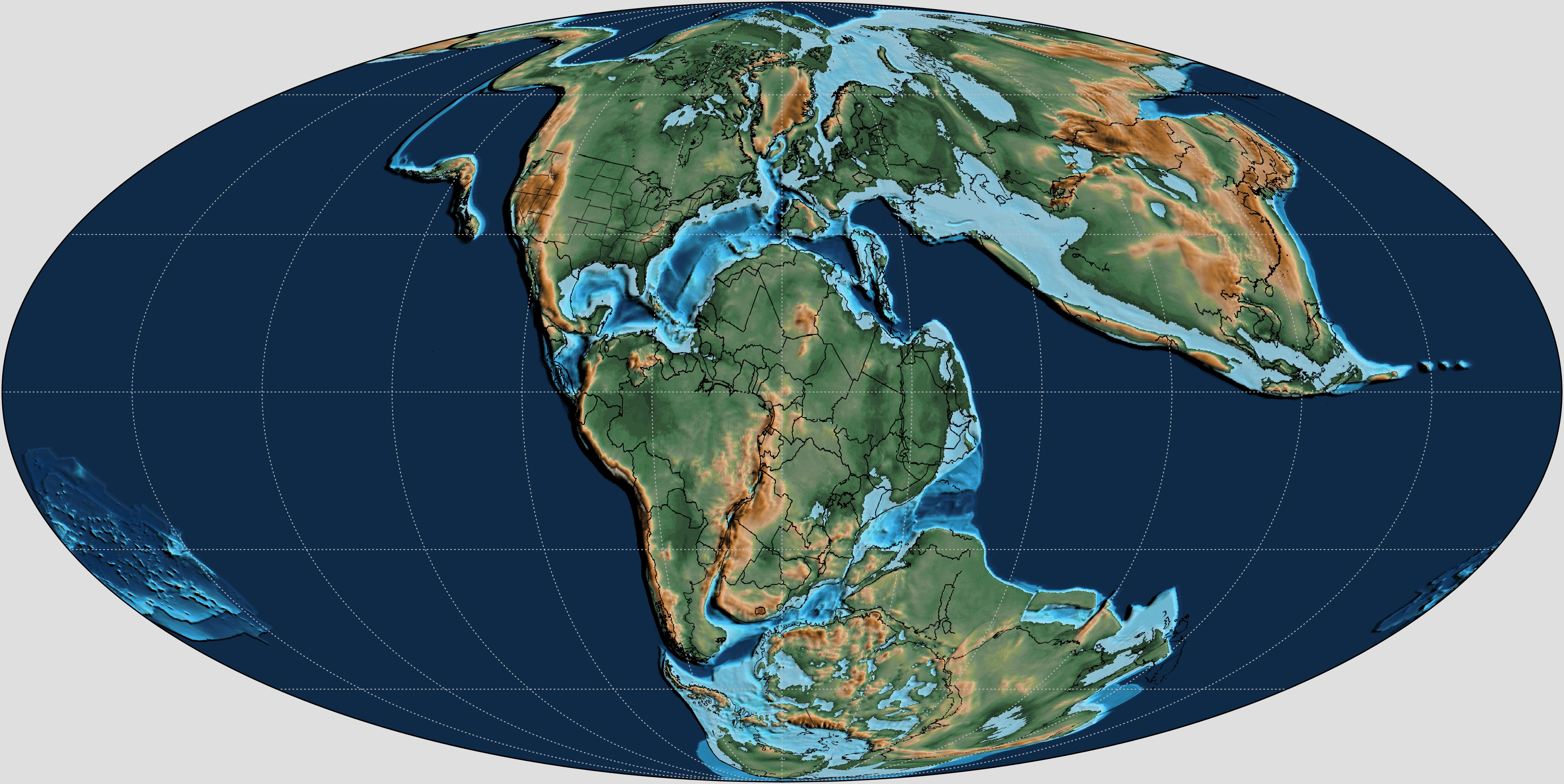
- Mollweide map of Earth 145 million years ago, with black outlines depicting countries in their locations

Chronology
← / Triassic–Jurassic extinction event
Subdivision of the Jurassic according to the ICS, as of 2024. Vertical axis scale: Millions of years ago

Etymology
- Name formality: Formal

Usage information
- Celestial body: Earth
- Regional usage: Global (ICS)
- Time scale(s) used: ICS Time Scale

Definition
- Chronological unit: Age
- Stratigraphic unit: Stage
- Time span formality: Formal
- Lower boundary definition: Not formally defined
- Lower boundary definition candidates: Base of magnetic polarity chronozone M22An.; FAD of the Ammonite genus Gravesia
- Lower boundary GSSP candidate section(s): Mount Crussol, France; Canjuers, France; Fornazzo, Sicily, Italy
- Upper boundary definition: Not formally defined
- Upper boundary definition candidates: Magnetic—base of Chron M18r; Base of Calpionellid zone B; FAD of Ammonite Berriasella jacobi
- Upper boundary GSSP candidate section(s): None

In the geological timescale, the Tithonian is the latest age of the Late Jurassic Epoch and the uppermost stage of the Upper Jurassic Series. It spans the time between 149.2 ±0.7 Ma and 143.1 ±0.6 (million years ago). It is preceded by the Kimmeridgian and followed by the Berriasian (part of the Cretaceous).

== Stratigraphic definitions ==
The Tithonian was introduced in scientific literature by German stratigrapher Albert Oppel in 1865. The name Tithonian is unusual in geological stage names because it is derived from Greek mythology. Tithonus was the son of Laomedon of Troy and fell in love with Eos, the Greek goddess of dawn. His name was chosen by Albert Oppel for this stratigraphical stage because the Tithonian finds itself hand in hand with the dawn of the Cretaceous.

The base of the Tithonian stage is at the base of the ammonite biozone of Hybonoticeras hybonotum. A global reference profile (a GSSP or golden spike) for the base of the Tithonian had in 2009 not yet been established.

The top of the Tithonian stage (the base of the Berriasian Stage and the Cretaceous System) is marked by the first appearance of small globular calpionellids of the species Calpionella alpina, at the base of the Alpina Subzone .

=== Subdivision ===
The Tithonian is often subdivided into Lower/Early, Middle and Upper/Late substages or subages. The Late Tithonian is coeval with the Portlandian Age of British stratigraphy.

The Tithonian stage contains seven ammonite biozones in the Tethys domain, from top to base:

- zone of Durangites
- zone of Micracanthoceras micranthum
- zone of Micracanthoceras ponti or Burckardticeras peroni
- zone of Semiformiceras fallauxi
- zone of Semiformiceras semiforme
- zone of Semiformiceras darwini
- zone of Hybonoticeras hybonotum

== Sedimentary environments ==
Sedimentary rocks that formed in the Tethys Ocean during the Tithonian include limestones, which preserve fossilized remains of, for example, cephalopods. The Solnhofen limestone of southern Germany, which is known for its fossils (especially Archaeopteryx), is of Tithonian age.

== Tithonian extinction ==
The later part of the Tithonian stage experienced an extinction event. It has been referred to as the Tithonian extinction, Jurassic-Cretaceous (J–K) extinction, or end-Jurassic extinction. This event was fairly minor and selective, by most metrics outside the top 10 largest extinctions since the Cambrian. Nevertheless, it was still one of the largest extinctions of the Jurassic Period, alongside the Toarcian Oceanic Anoxic Event (TOAE) in the Early Jurassic.

=== Potential causes ===
==== Cooling and sea level fall ====
The Tithonian extinction has not been studied in great detail, but it is usually attributed to habitat loss via a major marine regression (sea level fall). There is good evidence for a marine regression in Europe across the Jurassic-Cretaceous boundary, which may explain the localized nature of the extinction. On the other hand, there is no clear consensus on a correlation between sea level and terrestrial diversity during the Jurassic and Cretaceous. Some authors support a fundamental correlation (the so-called "common cause hypothesis"), while others strongly voice doubts. Sea level fall was likely related to the Tithonian climate, which was substantially colder and drier than the preceding Kimmeridgian stage. Northern coral reef ecosystems, such as those of the European Tethys, would have been particularly vulnerable to global cooling during this time.

==== Volcanism or asteroid impacts ====
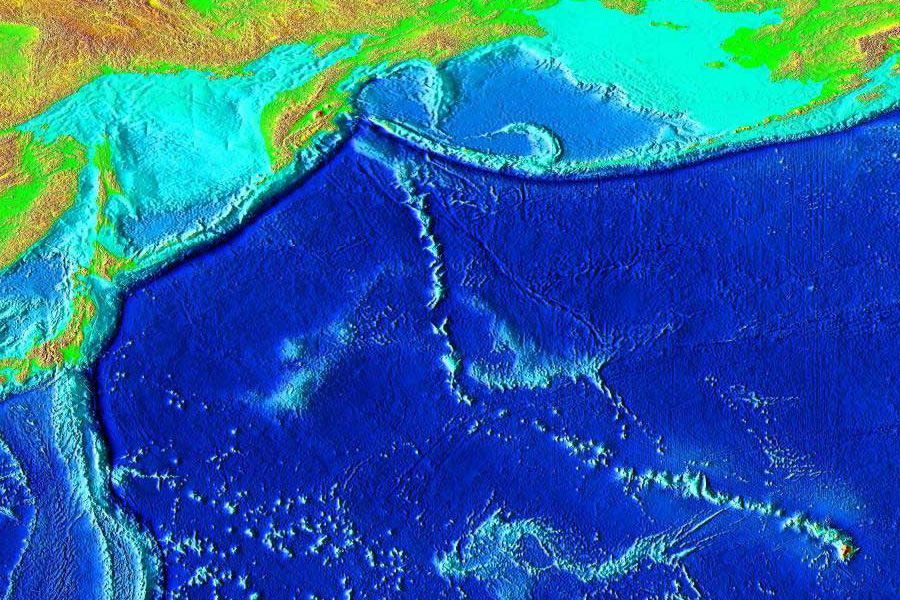
The Shatsky Rise labelled on a map of North Pacific volcanic features

Few Jurassic-Cretaceous boundary sections are precisely associated with carbon isotope anomalies. Several Arctic outcrops show a moderate (up to 5‰) negative organic δ13C excursion in the middle part of the Tithonian. This excursion, sometimes called the Volgian Isotopic Carbon Excursion (VOICE), may be a consequence of volcanic activity. The Tithonian stage saw the emplacement of the Shatsky Rise, a massive volcanic plateau in the North Pacific. During the Late Jurassic and Early Cretaceous, numerous volcanic deposits can be found along the margin of Gondwana, which was beginning to fragment into smaller continents.

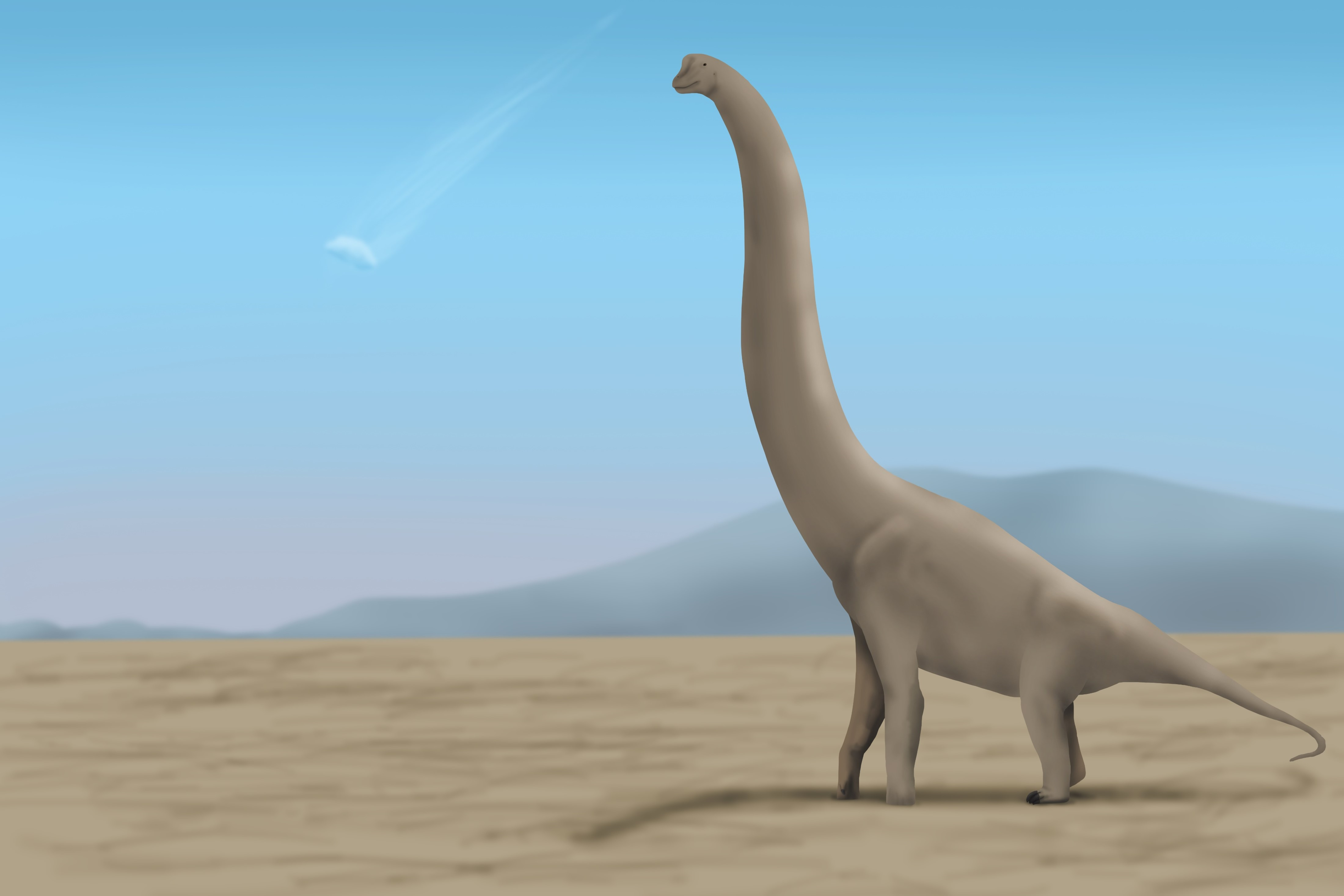
Artistic representation of a brachiosaurid, with the Morokweng impactor in the background, moments before impact

Three large impact craters have been tentatively dated to the Tithonian: the Morokweng Impact Structure (South Africa, 75 to 240 km diameter), Mjølnir crater (Barents Sea, 40 km diameter), and Gosses Bluff crater (Australia, 22 km diameter). These impacts would have caused local devastation, but likely had minimal impact on global ecosystems. Most volcanic events or extraterrestrial impacts in the Late Jurassic were concentrated around Gondwana, in contrast to the extinction event, which was centered on Laurasian ecosystems.

An iridium anomaly was found in Tithonian strata of north-eastern Brazil along with mercury and tellurium. The iridium is plausibly linked to the Morokweng structure whereas mercury and tellurium indicate volcanic input.

==== Sampling bias ====
It has been suggested that the putative extinction is a consequence of sampling biases. The Late Jurassic is packed with marine lagerstätten, exceptionally diverse and well-preserved fossil beds. A lack of earliest Cretaceous marine lagerstätten may appear as a loss of diversity, simply looking at the raw data alone. Sampling bias may also explain apparent extinctions in terrestrial environments, which have a similar disconnect in fossil abundance. This is most obvious in sauropod-bearing deposits, which are abundant in the Late Jurassic and rare in the earliest Cretaceous. Most studies relevant to the Tithonian extinction attempt to counteract sampling biases when estimating diversity loss or extinction rates. Depending on the sampling method or the taxonomic group, the Tithonian extinction may still be apparent even once sampling biases are accounted for.

=== Impact on life ===
In 1986, Jack Sepkoski argued that the Late Tithonian extinction was the largest extinction event between the end of the Triassic and the end of the Cretaceous. He estimated that a staggering 37% of genera died out during the Tithonian stage. Benton (1995) found a lower estimate, with the extinction of 5.6 to 13.3% of genera in the Tithonian. Proportional extinction was higher for continental genera (5.8–17.6%) than marine genera (5.1–6.1%). Sepkoski (1996) estimated that about 18% of multiple-interval marine genera (those originating prior to the Tithonian) died out in the Tithonian. Based on an updated version of Sepkoski's genera compendium, Bambach (2006) found a similar estimate of 20% of genera going extinct in the Late Tithonian.

==== Invertebrates ====
European bivalve diversity is severely depleted across the J–K boundary. However, bivalve fossils from the Andes and Siberia show little ecological turnover, so bivalve extinctions may have localized to the Tethys Sea. Only a fraction of Jurassic ammonite species survive to the Cretaceous, though extinction rates were actually lower in the late Tithonian relative to adjacent time intervals. Moderate diversity declines have been estimated or observed in gastropods, brachiopods, radiolarians, crustaceans, and scleractinian corals. This may have been related to the replacement of Jurassic-style coral reefs by Cretaceous-style rudist reefs. Reef decline was likely a gradual process, stretched out between the Oxfordian stage and the Valanginian stage.

==== Marine vertebrates ====
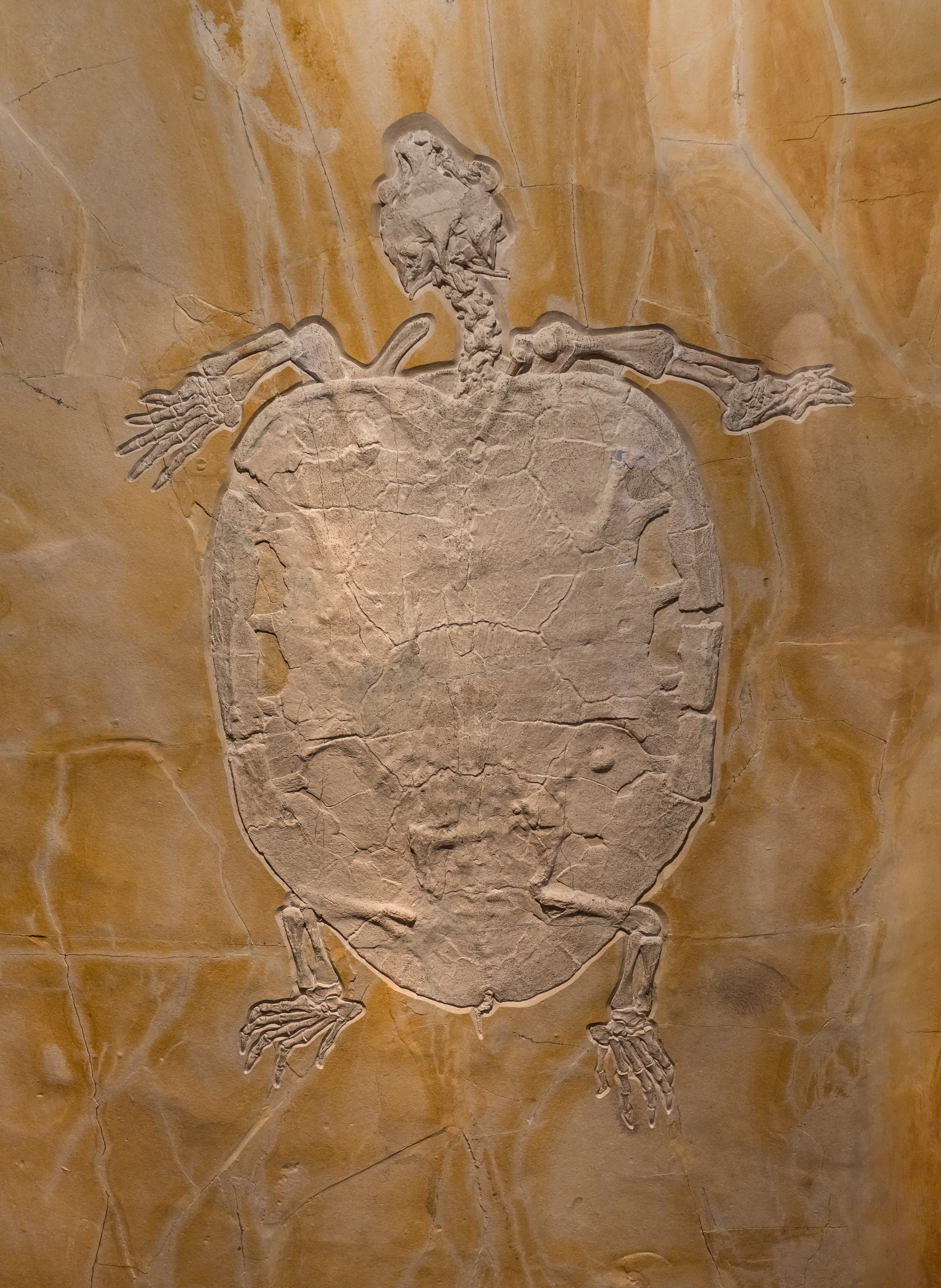
The Jurassic-Cretaceous transition saw the extinction of thalassochelydian turtles, such as Plesiochelys

Marine actinopterygians (ray-finned fishes) show elevated extinction rates across the Tithonian-Berriasian boundary. Most losses were quickly offset by substantial diversification in the Early Cretaceous. Sharks, rays, and freshwater fishes were nearly unaffected by the extinction.

Marine reptiles were strongly affected by the Tithonian extinction. Thalassochelydians, the most prominent Jurassic clade of marine turtles, were pushed to the brink of extinction. Only a single thalassochelydian fossil (an indeterminate skull from the Purbeck Group of England) is known from the Cretaceous. Among plesiosaurs, only a few species of Pliosauridae and Cryptoclididae persisted, and they too would die out in the Early Cretaceous. Conversely, the Tithonian extinction acted as a trigger for a Cretaceous diversification event for plesiosaurs in the clade Xenopsaria, namely elasmosaurids and leptocleidians. This turnover of marine reptile faunas may be a consequence of the turnover of reefs and marine fishes, which would have benefited generalized predators more than specialists.

It has long been suggested that ichthyosaurs and marine teleosauroid crocodyliforms declined across the J–K boundary, with the latter group even going extinct. More recent finds suggest that ichthyosaurs diversity remained stable or even increased in the Early Cretaceous. Early Cretaceous ichthyosaur fossils are rare enough that this hypothesis is still a matter of debate. European teleosauroids did indeed suffer total extinction, but teleosauroids as a whole survived into the Early Cretaceous in other parts of the world. Metriorhynchoids, the other major group of marine crocodyliforms, were not strongly affected by the Tithonian extinction.

==== Terrestrial vertebrates ====
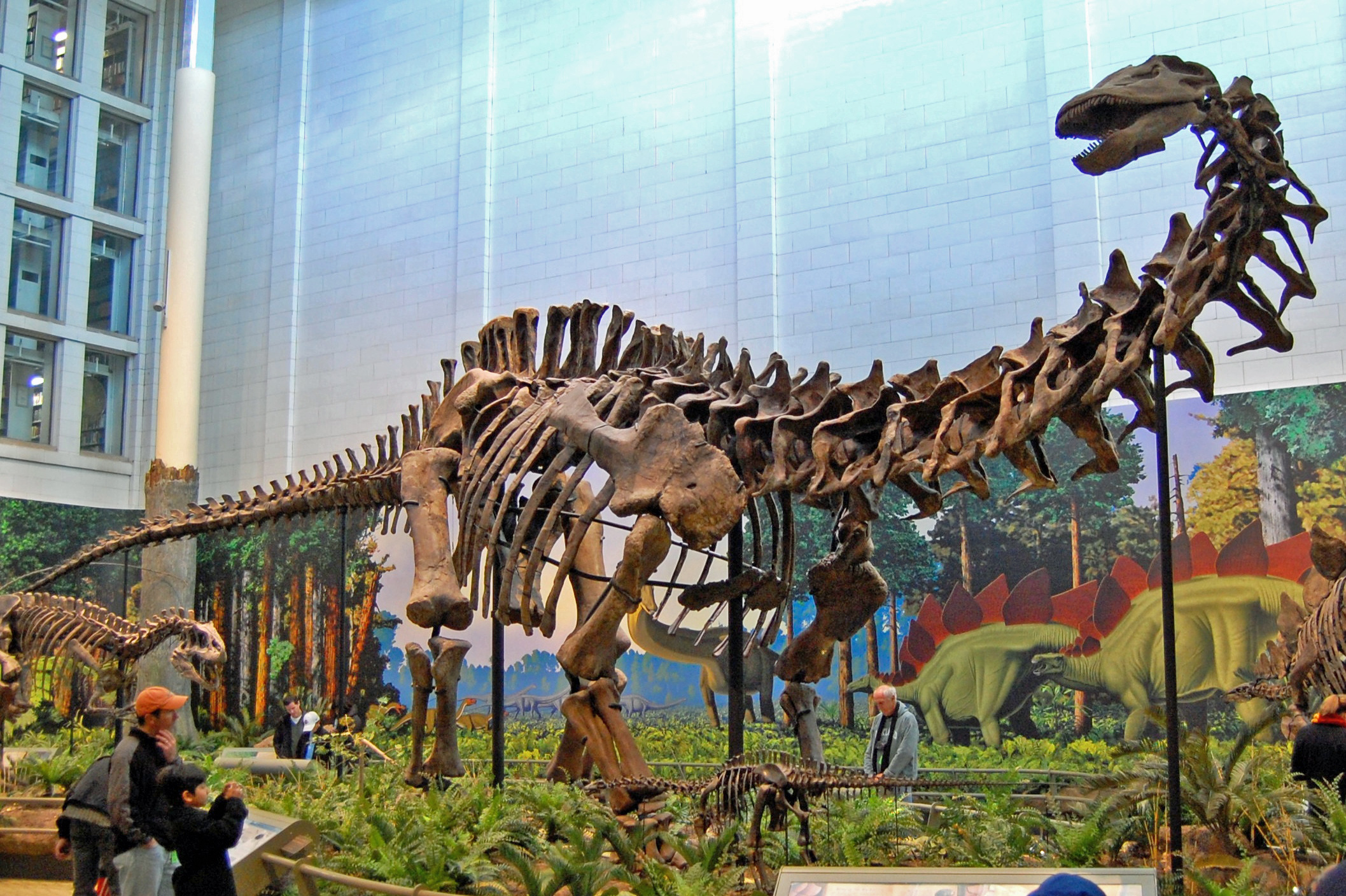
Some studies have argued that sauropods, like Apatosaurus louisae, were strongly impacted by the Tithonian extinction

On land, sauropod dinosaur diversity was significantly reduced according to many (but not all) estimates. Diplodocids, basal macronarians, and mamenchisaurids took the brunt of the extinction, though a few species of each group survived to the Early Cretaceous. Conversely, rebbachisaurids and somphospondyls saw the opportunity to diversify in the Cretaceous. Turiasaurs also survived the extinction and even expanded into North America during the Early Cretaceous. Theropod diversity declined through the entire Late Jurassic, with medium-sized predators such as megalosaurids being the hardest hit. Ornithischian (particularly stegosaur) diversity saw a small drop across the J–K boundary. Theropod and ornithischian extinctions were notably less pronounced than in sauropods.

Most non-pterodactyloid pterosaurs perished by the end of the Jurassic. Practically no earliest Cretaceous sites are known to preserve pterosaur fossils, so the precise timing of non-pterodactyloid extinctions is very uncertain. Coastal and freshwater crocodyliforms experienced high extinction rates across the J–K boundary, preceding a significant diversification of more terrestrially-adapted metasuchians in the Cretaceous. Coastal and freshwater turtle diversity also declined, at least in Europe. Many tetrapod groups saw strong (albeit gradual) ecological turnover through the J-K boundary. These groups include lissamphibians, lepidosaurs, choristoderes, and mammaliaforms.
