= Morokweng impact structure =

Impact structure in the Kalahari Desert

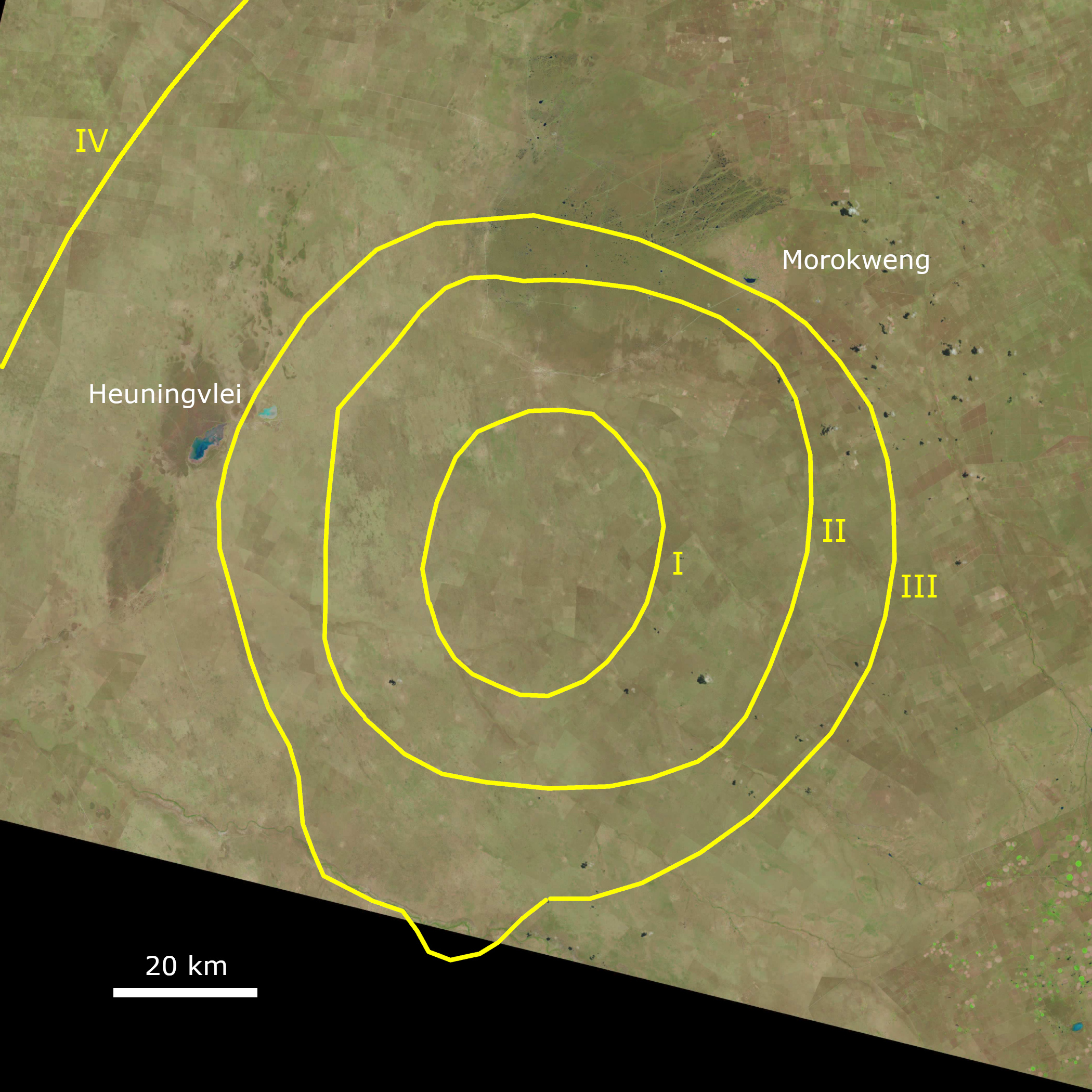
- Ring I: outer limit of the melt sheet + meteorite fragments Ring II: outer limit of melt and/or suevite/allochthonous breccia Ring III: outer limit of shock metamorphism, central uplift, and intense brecciation Ring IV: zone of groundwater-bearing fractures, faulting, and the limit of post-impact doming

- Location within South Africa
- Location: North West, South Africa; 26.466667°S 23.533333°E

Impact crater structure
- Confidence: Confirmed
- Age: 146.06 ± 0.16 Ma
- Exposed: No
- Drilled: Yes
- Bolide type: LL chondrite

The Morokweng impact structure is an impact structure buried beneath the Kalahari Desert near the town of Morokweng in South Africa's North West province, close to the border with Botswana.

== Description ==
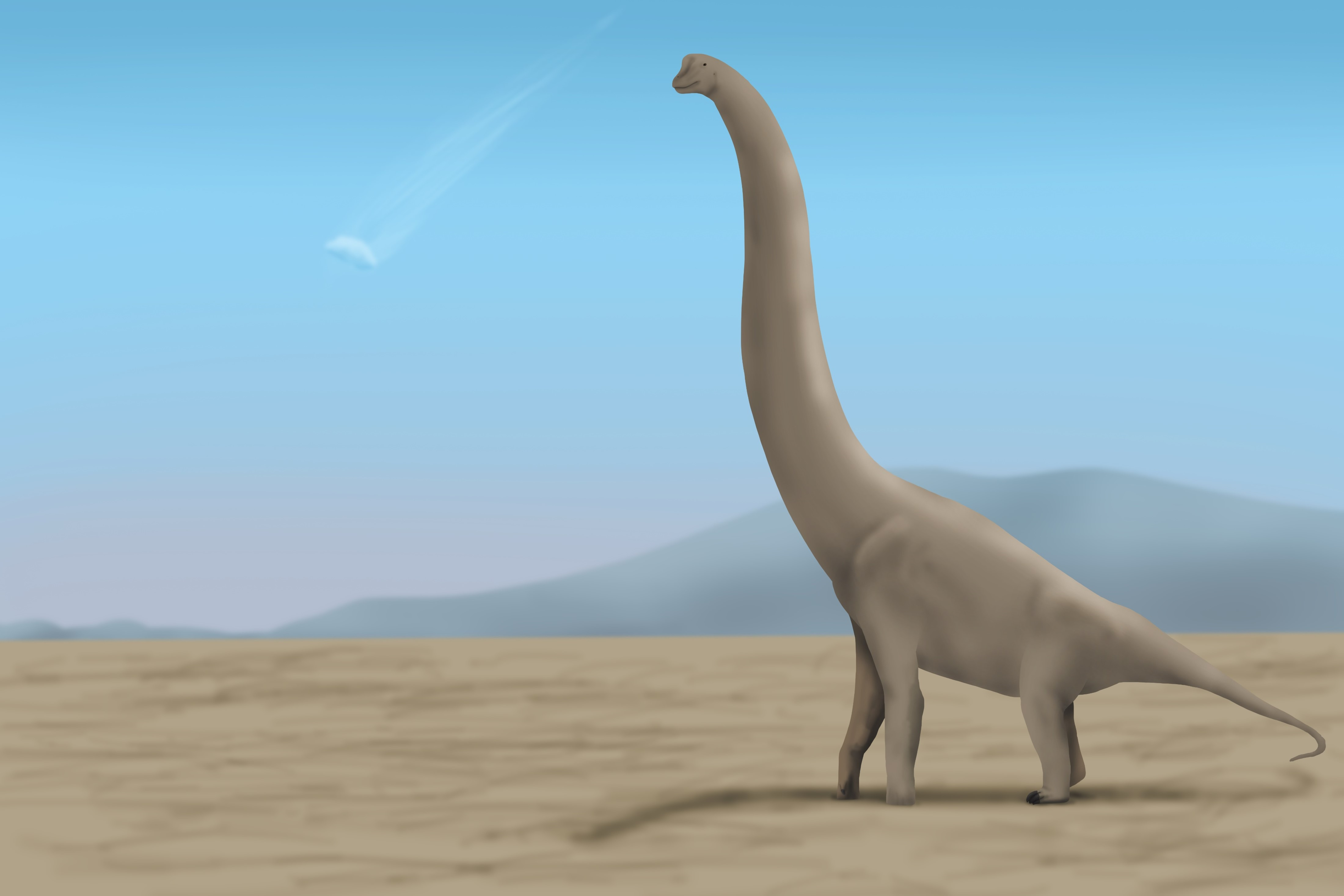
Artistic representation of a brachiosaurid, with the Morokweng impactor in the background, moments before impact

Estimates of the diameter of the structure vary widely with some studies suggesting a smaller size of 75–80 km (47–50 mi) in diameter while others suggests a much larger size of around 240 km (150 mi) or more. The most recent attempts to calculate the true size of the impact structure, by integrating petrographic observations of boreholes with images of the national gravity and airborne magnetic fields, finds a likely structure size of around 190 km (120 mi). Its age is estimated to be 146.06 ± 0.16 million years, placing it within the Tithonian stage of the Late Jurassic, several million years before the Jurassic–Cretaceous boundary. Discovered in 1994, it is not exposed at the surface, but has been mapped by magnetic and gravimetric surveys. Core samples have shown it to have been formed by the impact of an L chondrite asteroid estimated to have been 5 to 10 km (3.1 to 6.2 mi) in diameter.

In May, 2006, a group of scientists drilling into the site announced the discovery of a 25-centimetre-diameter (9.8 in) fragment of the original asteroid at a depth of 770 m (2,530 ft) below the surface, along with several much smaller pieces a few millimetres across at other depths. This discovery was unexpected, since previous drillings on large impact structures had not produced such fragments, and it was thought that the asteroid had been almost entirely vaporised. Its composition was unusual for an asteroid, it contains iron-rich silicates and sulphides but no metal. Some of the fragments can be seen in the Antenna Wing of London's Science Museum and in the "Museo del cielo e della Terra" sited in San Giovanni in Persiceto (Bologna - Italy).

A 2007 paper by Andreoli and others compiled microgravity, aeromagnetic, satellite, and borehole data to present the case that the structure is up to 240 km diameter with five "rings" representing differing subsurface conditions. Four of the five rings are shown in the figure in upper right.

== Role in Tithonian extinction event ==
An iridium layer was found in the Tithonian strata of the Araripe basin in north-eastern Brazil with a possible link to this structure.
