= Molopo Local Municipality =

Coordinates: 25°50′S 23°35′E

(Former) Molopo
- Local municipality
- Location in the North West
- Country: South Africa
- Province: North West
- District: Dr Ruth Segomotsi Mompati District
- Seat: Tosca

Area
  - Total: 12,473 km^{2} (4,816 sq mi)

Population (2007)
  - Total: 6,516
  - Density: 0.5224/km^{2} (1.353/sq mi)
- Time zone: UTC+2 (SAST)
- Municipal code: NW395

Molopo Local Municipality was a local municipality in Dr Ruth Segomotsi Mompati District Municipality, North West Province, South Africa, until the election of 18 May 2011, when it was merged with the Kagisano Local Municipality to form the Kagisano-Molopo Local Municipality.

== Main places ==
Main places of the municipality, from the 2001 census:

Place	Code
Pomfret	61502
Remainder of the municipality	61501
