= Christiana, South Africa =

Christiana
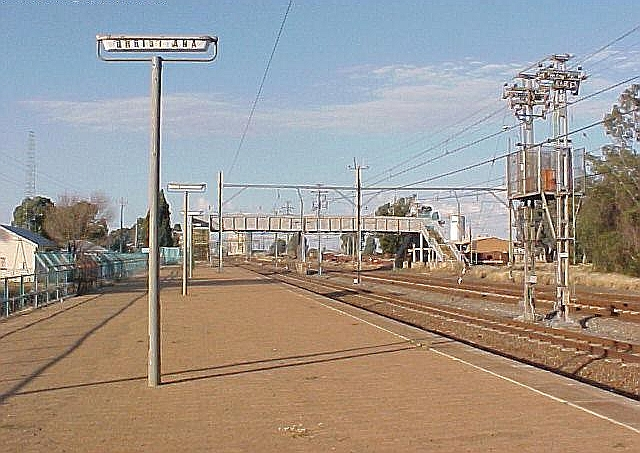
- Christiana railway station

- Location within North West (South African province) Location within South Africa
- Coordinates: 27°55′12″S 25°9′36″E
- Country: South Africa
- Province: North West
- District: Dr Ruth Segomotsi Mompati
- Municipality: Lekwa-Teemane
- Established: 1870

Area
  - Total: 50.20 km^{2} (19.38 sq mi)

Population (2011)
  - Total: 3,571
  - Density: 71.14/km^{2} (184.2/sq mi)

Racial makeup (2011)
  - Black African: 16.6%
  - Coloured: 3.3%
  - Indian/Asian: 1.1%
  - White: 77.6%
  - Other: 1.5%

First languages (2011)
  - Afrikaans: 84.9%
  - Tswana: 7.2%
  - English: 4.4%
  - Sotho: 1.2%
  - Other: 2.4%
- Time zone: UTC+2 (SAST)
- Postal code (street): 2680
- PO box: 2680
- Area code: 053

Christiana is an agricultural town of about 3,000 inhabitants on the banks of the Vaal River in North West province, South Africa. The town is located on the N12 national route between Bloemhof and Warrenton, on the way to Kimberley (Northern Cape). It is the administrative centre and seat of Lekwa-Teemane Local Municipality.

== History ==
When diamonds were discovered in the Vaal River in the 1870's Transvaal Government established a settlement on the banks of the river in 1870, in an attempt to control and alleviate land disputes over diamond discoveries further down the Vaal River. This town was established on the farm Zoutpansdrift ("salt pan drift") and named Christiana, after the only daughter of President Pretorius of the old Transvaal. The first residential stands were sold in 1870.

Two years later diamonds were discovered close by in the gravel bed of the Vaal River, and the inevitable manic rush followed. As usual, the initial rush petered with the diamonds. In 1997, diamonds were rediscovered along the banks of a farm on the Free State side of Christiana. This led to a new diamond rush and diggings that continue to this day.

== Economy ==
The town contains one of the biggest diggers' bells ever to exist in the world. The bell is currently underwater in the Vaal River as it once sank and ended in the drowning of several diggers. There were a few attempts to get the diggers' bell out, as it is said that there are diamonds still in it, but it was in vain as it is surrounded by too much mud.

Christiana is one of the corners of the "Maize Rectangle", with the mainstay of the economy being the production of maize, potatoes, onions, sorghum, groundnuts and beef. The main farmers in the area are the de Beer's and Callender-Easby's. South Africa's top horse stud, Callaho Warmblood Sport Horses, can be found near Christiana.

Christiana is well known for its water sports along the Vaal River, as well as the Diamond Diggers Festival (Delwers Fees) that occurs annually. Other tourist attractions include the Diggers' Diamond Museum (authentic digging equipment and old photographs pay tribute to the town's diamond industry) and San Bushman rock art (excellent examples can be viewed 6 km out of town on the Farm Stowlands) and Stows Kopje (prehistoric rock engravings which are a provincial heritage site).

== Well-known people from the town ==
- Elizabeth Komikie Gumede (1921–2016), South African anti-apartheid activist, was born in Christiana.
