= Morokweng =

- Location within North West (South African province) Location within South Africa
- Coordinates: 26.127°S 23.775°E
- Country: South Africa
- Province: North West
- District: Dr Ruth Segomotsi Mompati
- Municipality: Kagisano/Molopo

Area
  - Total: 24.17 km^{2} (9.33 sq mi)

Population (2011)
  - Total: 14,260
  - Density: 590.0/km^{2} (1,528/sq mi)

Racial makeup (2011)
  - Black African: 97.4%
  - Coloured: 1.8%
  - Indian/Asian: 0.3%
  - Other: 0.5%

First languages (2011)
  - Tswana: 93.4%
  - Afrikaans: 2.3%
  - English: 1.6%
  - Other: 2.8%
- Time zone: UTC+2 (SAST)
- Postal code (street): 8614
- PO box: 8614
- Area code: 053

Morokweng is a town in Kagisano-Molopo Local Municipality in the North West province of South Africa.

The village, which lies 140 kilometres north-west of Vryburg, was first occupied by Kgosi Maiketso in the 1790s after he broke away from the main Barolong faction at Kuruman.

When Bechuanaland came under British control in 1886, Morokweng was designated a Native Reserve, with an area that by the late 1950s was estimated to be 160,000 morgen in extent.

In 1994, a large impact structure, the Morokweng impact structure, was discovered in the ground near the village.
