= R376 (South Africa) =

Regional route in South Africa

Regional route R376

Location
- Country: South Africa

Highway system
- Numbered routes of South Africa
← R375	→ R377

The R376 is a Regional Route in South Africa that connects the N18 at Setlagole to the south-east with the R375 to the north-west.
