= Stella, South Africa =

Stella
- Location within North West (South African province) Location within South Africa
- Coordinates: 26°33′S 24°52′E
- Country: South Africa
- Province: North West
- District: Dr Ruth Segomotsi Mompati
- Municipality: Naledi

Area
  - Total: 9.06 km^{2} (3.50 sq mi)

Population (2011)
  - Total: 890
  - Density: 98/km^{2} (250/sq mi)

Racial makeup (2011)
  - Black African: 32.4%
  - Coloured: 2.7%
  - Indian/Asian: 1.1%
  - White: 62.5%
  - Other: 1.2%

First languages (2011)
  - Afrikaans: 75.3%
  - Tswana: 17.5%
  - English: 3.6%
  - Other: 3.6%
- Time zone: UTC+2 (SAST)
- Postal code (street): 8650
- PO box: 8650
- Area code: 053

Stella is a cattle farming town situated in North West Province of South Africa between Vryburg and Mafikeng.

The large salt pan on the outskirts of town, especially well known for the number of lions in the area, was visited by a number of early European travellers, including David Livingstone and Robert Moffat.

The first white people settled in the area in 1882, and the following year a fight broke out between the baTlhaping and the Korana under David Mossweu. A large number of white mercenaries fought on both sides of the conflict, and when the war ended they were given land to farm in return for their services. Under their leader, Van Niekerk, they proclaimed their area the Republic of Stellaland, after a comet which had been visible while the fighting was going on. Electricity was introduced only in 1973.

The Stella Beesfees (Cattle Festival) is held every year during October. The town has a high school, but this also houses the nursery and primary pupils.
