= Biesiesvlei =

- Location within North West (South African province) Location within South Africa
- Coordinates: 26.383°S 25.9°E
- Country: South Africa
- Province: North West
- District: Ngaka Modiri Molema
- Municipality: Ditsobotla

Area
  - Total: 3.53 km^{2} (1.36 sq mi)

Population (2011)
  - Total: 116
  - Density: 32.9/km^{2} (85.1/sq mi)

Racial makeup (2011)
  - Black African: 29.3%
  - Coloured: 0.9%
  - Indian/Asian: 9.5%
  - White: 54.3%
  - Other: 6.0%

First languages (2011)
  - Afrikaans: 59.5%
  - Tswana: 19.8%
  - English: 6.0%
  - Sotho: 6.0%
  - Other: 8.6%
- Time zone: UTC+2 (SAST)
- Postal code (street): 2755
- PO box: 2755
- Area code: 018

Biesiesvlei is a settlement in Ditsobotla Local Municipality in the North West province of South Africa.

The village is owned by the Mafethe's family.

On 2 August 2023, Dr. Carel Nel was murdered at his farmstead in Biesiesvlei. Some attributed his murder to the singing of the anthem "Kill the Boer" by the Economic Freedom Fighters (EFF), which was reported on the online website, The South African.
