= Ramokokastad =

- Location within North West (South African province) Location within South Africa
- Coordinates: 25.157°S 27.438°E
- Country: South Africa
- Province: North West
- District: Bojanala Platinum
- Municipality: Moses Kotane

Area
  - Total: 6.36 km^{2} (2.46 sq mi)

Population (2011)
  - Total: 5,141
  - Density: 808/km^{2} (2,090/sq mi)

Racial makeup (2011)
  - Black African: 99.8%
  - Indian/Asian: 0.1%
  - Other: 0.1%

First languages (2011)
  - Tswana: 92.8%
  - English: 2.8%
  - Sign language: 1.2%
  - Other: 3.2%
- Time zone: UTC+2 (SAST)
- PO box: 0195
- Area code: 014

Ramokokastad is in the North West Province of South Africa. It is near Rustenburg.

It comprises four sub villages namely: Phadi, Mmorogong, Bojating and Phalane. Other villages which are far from the main village are Mantserre, Phalane o monye and Tlaseng. The village is about 70 km from Mogwase and about 30 km from Northam. The village is just at the border of Limpopo and other farms belonging to the village are in Limpopo Province.
