= Koffiefontein =

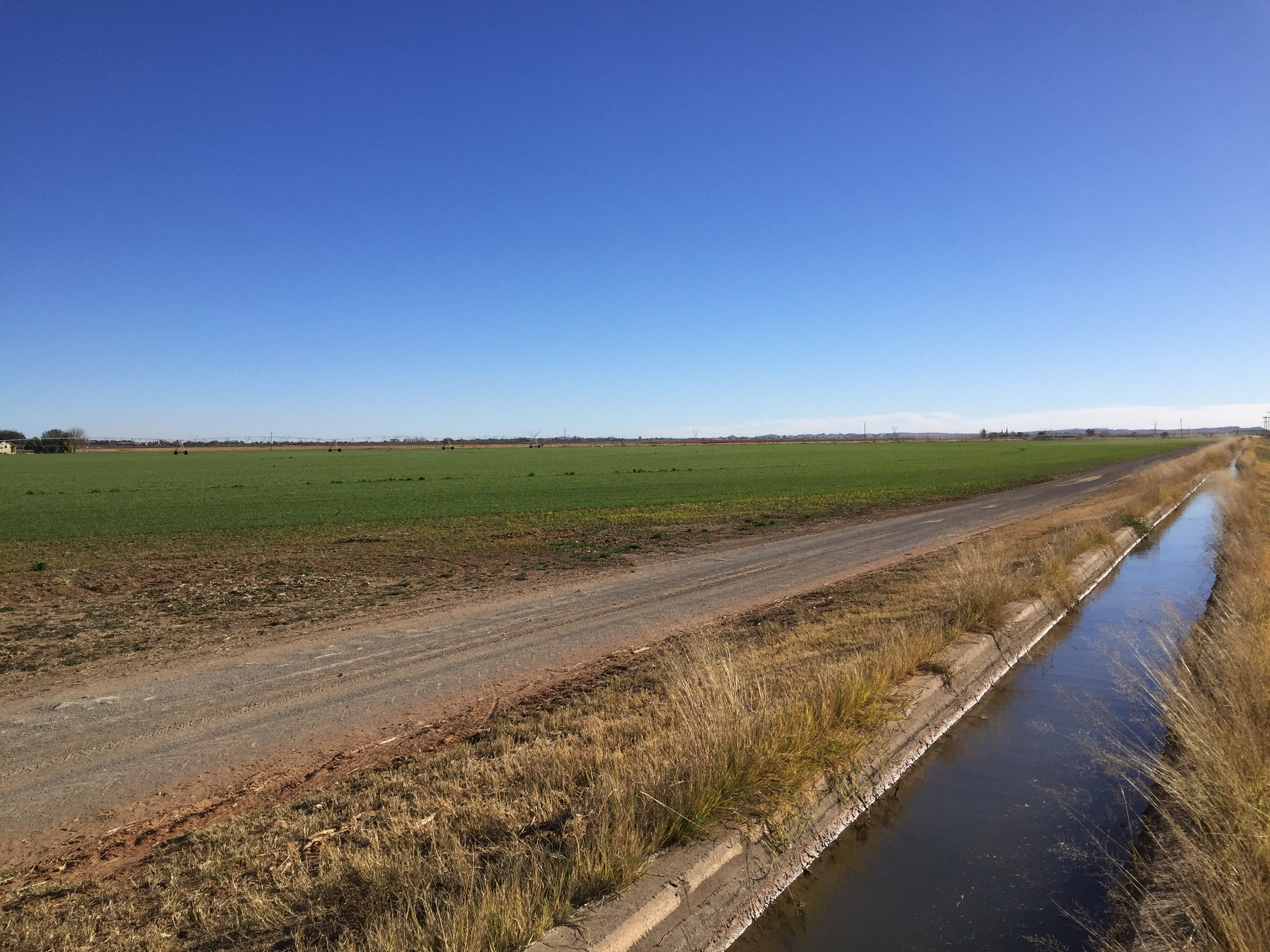

- Location within Free State (South African province) Location within South Africa
- Coordinates: 29°24′29″S 25°0′8″E
- Country: South Africa
- Province: Free State
- District: Xhariep
- Municipality: Letsemeng
- Established: 1892

Area
  - Total: 36.85 km^{2} (14.23 sq mi)

Population (2011)
  - Total: 10,402
  - Density: 282.3/km^{2} (731.1/sq mi)

Racial makeup (2011)
  - Black African: 74.0%
  - Coloured: 20.4%
  - Indian/Asian: 0.3%
  - White: 4.7%
  - Other: 0.6%

First languages (2011)
  - Afrikaans: 63.1%
  - Sotho: 14.2%
  - Xhosa: 12.1%
  - Tswana: 7.0%
  - Other: 3.7%
- Time zone: UTC+2 (SAST)
- Postal code (street): 9986
- PO box: 9986
- Area code: 053

Koffiefontein is a small farming town in the Free State province of South Africa. The name means coffee spring/fountain in Afrikaans.

== History ==
In the 1800s, Koffiefontein was a stopover spot for transport riders traveling between the coast and the diamond fields and gold mines to the north. "Coffee fountain" is a reference to the strong coffee brew transport riders made during their stopover. "Coffee fountain" involved transport riders grinding their own coffee beans (often with a spoon) and using the water of a natural spring to boil for the brew. Upon the discovery of diamonds near the natural spring in 1870, a town quickly developed at the Koffiefontein stopover spot, as prospectors began to mine the area in search of high quality diamonds.

Koffiefontein's proximity to Mafikeng and Kimberley meant that it became involved in the Second Anglo-Boer War (1899-1902). Blockhouses, which served as defensive fortresses, were erected by the British in 1900 and are still standing in the twenty-first century.

=== Second Anglo-Boer War ===
The Koffiefontein district saw much military action during the Second Anglo-Boer War of 1899-1902 because it was close to the two strategic towns of Kimberley and Mafeking. After Boer forces under the command of General Brand and Commandant Hertzog attacked the town and its mine, several blockhouses were erected by the British in October 1900. The blockhouses were involved in actions in the subsequent months and at one point the town was looted by the Boers and the people of the town took refuge in the mine.

=== Second World War ===
During the Second World War a large internment camp was opened in the town, with 2,000 Italian prisoners of war, some German prisoners of war, and some 800 South African internees, who were suspected of being pro-Nazi. Among the internees was Frans Erasmus and John Vorster who became prime minister of South Africa in 1966 and was president of the country from 1978 to 1979. The remains of murals painted by the Italian POWs can still be viewed in the town as can the barracks in which they were held.

== Local industry ==
Farming in the district focuses on cattle and sheep farming with lucerne, potatoes and ground nuts being the main crops sown. There used to be a cheese factory and vineyards in the town. The Kalkfontein Dam on the Riet river provides water for the towns of Jacobsdal and Koffiefontein.

=== Diamonds ===
The area was a coffee stop for many transport riders in the 19th century until one of the riders discovered a diamond, and a town grew rapidly. The diamonds of Koffiefontein were known to be of the "first water"; meaning of very good clarity. The diamond mine established by De Beers in 1870 was closed down in 2006. The mine was then acquired by Petra Diamonds in 2007 and is currently still in operation. Although the mine and supporting businesses have employed a large number of the local population, the area is still characterised by poverty. Census data indicate that 57% of the Koffiefontein population are below the poverty line.

== Places of interest ==
Apart from diamonds the town is best known as having been the home of Etienne Leroux, a famous Afrikaans novelist whose homestead and grave can be visited. There are also many Bushman (San) paintings in the district. To commemorate the allusion to the coffee drinking tradition of the transport riders in the name of the town, there is a fountain that resembles a coffee pot pouring out a drink.

A First World War Monument is situated opposite the golf course in the town, on a tiny hill behind the school. There is a cannon next to the monument. To date the wall murals by Fascio, an Italian inmate of the concentration camp are still on display.
