= Ganyesa =

- Location within North West (South African province) Location within South Africa
- Coordinates: 26°35′27″S 24°9′34″E
- Country: South Africa
- Province: North West
- District: Dr Ruth Segomotsi Mompati
- Municipality: Kagisano/Molopo

Area
  - Total: 21.46 km^{2} (8.29 sq mi)

Population (2011)
  - Total: 19,290
  - Density: 898.9/km^{2} (2,328/sq mi)

Racial makeup (2011)
  - Black African: 98.4%
  - Coloured: 0.7%
  - Indian/Asian: 0.4%
  - White: 0.1%
  - Other: 0.5%

First languages (2011)
  - Tswana: 92.7%
  - English: 1.9%
  - S. Ndebele: 1.3%
  - Zulu: 1.2%
  - Other: 3.0%
- Time zone: UTC+2 (SAST)
- PO box: 8613
- Area code: 053

Ganyesa is a town of about 19,000 people in the North West province of South Africa. It is located 70 kilometres (40 mi) north-west of Vryburg and about 170 kilometres (110 mi) south-west of the provincial capital Mafikeng.

It is an administrative centre for the far north-western area of the province, hosting the head offices of the Kagisano-Molopo Local Municipality, a magistrate's court and various national and provincial government offices.

The census of 2011 recorded the population of the town as 19,290 people, of whom the vast majority were black (98%) and Tswana-speaking (93%).

== History ==
Ganyesa is the main town of the Barolong boo Mariba, a faction of the Barolong that split from the Kuruman community in about 1765 under Kgosi-Kgolo Mochware and lived as pastoralists and hunters. In the late 19th century, competition with Kora traders for the Kalahari trade led to friction between the communities. After the British established the British Bechuanaland colony in 1886, Ganyesa was designated as a native reserve, with an area that in the late 1950s was estimated as capital homeland of Barolong bo Mariba, under Kgosi Letlhogile. It was later that Kgosi-Kgolo Mochware made the strongest form of Barolong boo Mariba and His descendants were 1.Makgobi(Makgobistad-Phitsane)

2.Gaetsalwe(Ganyesa;Leporung;Lobatse)

3.Pheko(Ghanzi)

4.Selepile(Madiakgame; Austrey)

5.Borupile(Kikahela)

KgosiKgolo Mochware reigned for a period of time [1765-1887] and later on his descendants of his other branch took over who is Kgosi Kgotlakoma Mochware and made a significant role in the administration of Barolong boo Mariba Boo "Ganyesa - Wikipedia" https://en.m.wikipedia.org/wiki/Ganyesa#/editor/1
