= Lekwa-Teemane Local Municipality =

Coordinates: 27°40′S 25°20′E

Lekwa-Teemane
- Local municipality
- Seal

- Location in the North West
- Country: South Africa
- Province: North West
- District: Dr Ruth Segomotsi Mompati
- Seat: Christiana
- Wards: 7

Government
  - Type: Municipal council
  - Mayor: Sebang Motlhabi (ANC)

Area
  - Total: 3,681 km^{2} (1,421 sq mi)

Population (2011)
  - Total: 53,248
  - Density: 14.47/km^{2} (37.47/sq mi)

Racial makeup (2011)
  - Black African: 81.2%
  - Coloured: 7.4%
  - Indian/Asian: 0.6%
  - White: 10.4%

First languages (2011)
  - Tswana: 64.4%
  - Afrikaans: 17.8%
  - Sotho: 6.0%
  - Xhosa: 5.5%
  - Other: 6.3%
- Time zone: UTC+2 (SAST)
- Municipal code: NW396

Lekwa-Teemane Municipality (Tswana: Mmasepala wa Lekwa-Teemane; Afrikaans: Lekwa-Teemane Munisipaliteit) is a local municipality within the Dr Ruth Segomotsi Mompati District Municipality, located in the North West province of South Africa. The seat of the municipality is Christiana.

== Main places ==
The 2001 census divided the municipality into the following main places:

Place	Code	Area (km^{2})	Population	Most spoken language
Bloemhof	61601	68.09	4,987	Afrikaans
Boitumelong	61602	3.14	23,155	Tswana
Christiana	61603	59.91	4,862	Afrikaans
Utlwanang	61605	2.34	11,701	Tswana
Remainder of the municipality	61604	3,572.35	4,366	Tswana

== Politics ==
The municipal council consists of fourteen members elected by mixed-member proportional representation. Seven are elected by first-past-the-post voting in seven wards, while the remaining seven are chosen from party lists so that the total number of party representatives is proportional to the number of votes received.

In the election of 4 November 2026 no party won a majority on the council, with the African National Congress (ANC) and Economic Freedom Fighters (EFF) both winning five seats.

The following table shows the results of the 2026 election.

Party	Ward			List			Total seats
Party	Votes	%	Seats	Votes	%	Seats	Total seats
African National Congress	5,593	34.98	2	5,617	34.99	3	5
Economic Freedom Fighters	5,275	32.99	4	5,284	32.91	1	5
Democratic Alliance	1,324	8.28	1	1,299	8.09	0	1
African Congress for Transformation	1,288	8.05	0	1,251	7.79	1	1
Freedom Front Plus	964	6.03	0	989	6.16	1	1
ActionSA	772	4.83	0	760	4.73	1	1
6 other parties	775	4.85	0	855	5.33	0	0
Total	15,991	100.00	7	16,055	100.00	7	14
Valid votes	15,991	96.01		16,055	96.32		
Invalid/blank votes	665	3.99		613	3.68		
Total votes	16,656	100.00		16,668	100.00		
Registered voters/turnout	29,280	56.89		29,280	56.93		
