= Naledi Local Municipality, North West =

Coordinates: 26°50′S 24°50′E

Naledi
- Local municipality
- Seal

- Location in the North West
- Country: South Africa
- Province: North West
- District: Dr Ruth Segomotsi Mompati
- Seat: Vryburg
- Wards: 9

Government
  - Type: Municipal council
  - Mayor: Cliffton J. Groep (ANC)

Area
  - Total: 6,941 km^{2} (2,680 sq mi)

Population (2011)
  - Total: 66,781
  - Density: 9.621/km^{2} (24.92/sq mi)

Racial makeup (2011)
  - Black African: 74.0%
  - Coloured: 14.7%
  - Indian/Asian: 1.1%
  - White: 9.5%

First languages (2011)
  - Tswana: 68.8%
  - Afrikaans: 23.8%
  - English: 3.4%
  - Other: 4%
- Time zone: UTC+2 (SAST)
- Municipal code: NW392
- Website: www.naledilm.co.za

Naledi Municipality (Tswana: Mmasepala wa Naledi; Afrikaans: Naledi Munisipaliteit) is a local municipality within the Dr Ruth Segomotsi Mompati District Municipality, in the North West province of South Africa. The seat of the municipality is Vryburg.

== Main places ==
The 2001 census divided the municipality into the following main places:

Place	Code	Area (km^{2})	Population	Most spoken language
Huhudi	61201	4.09	21,572	Tswana
Stella	61203	6.74	1,109	Afrikaans
Vryburg	61204	64.13	14,601	Afrikaans
Remainder of the municipality	61202	7,192.18	20,827	Tswana

== Politics ==
The municipal council consists of eighteen members elected by mixed-member proportional representation. Nine are elected by first-past-the-post voting in nine wards, while the remaining nine are chosen from party lists so that the total number of party representatives is proportional to the number of votes received.

In the election of 4 November 2026 the African National Congress (ANC) lost its majority, but remains the largest party with nine seats.

The following table shows the results of the 2021 election.

Party	Ward			List			Total seats
Party	Votes	%	Seats	Votes	%	Seats	Total seats
African National Congress	8,312	44.75	8	8,667	49.35	1	9
Democratic Alliance	2,604	14.02	1	2,730	15.55	2	3
Batho Pele Community Association	1,333	7.18	0	1,354	7.71	1	1
Economic Freedom Fighters	1,107	5.96	0	1,209	6.88	1	1
Independent candidates	1,889	10.17	0				0
Freedom Front Plus	816	4.39	0	834	4.75	1	1
Patriotic Alliance	514	2.77	0	513	2.92	1	1
Afrika Mayibuye Movement	433	2.33	0	454	2.59	1	1
ActionSA	399	2.15	0	465	2.65	1	1
8 other parties	1,169	6.29	0	1,335	7.60	0	0
Total	18,576	100.00	9	17,561	100.00	9	18
Valid votes	18,576	94.20		17,561	91.94		
Invalid/blank votes	1,144	5.80		1,539	8.06		
Total votes	19,720	100.00		19,100	100.00		
Registered voters/turnout	37,629	52.41		37,629	50.76		
