= Greater Taung Local Municipality =

Coordinates: 27°30′S 24°25′E

Greater Taung
- Local municipality
- Seal

- Location in the North West
- Country: South Africa
- Province: North West
- District: Dr Ruth Segomotsi Mompati
- Seat: Taung
- Wards: 26

Government
  - Type: Municipal council
  - Mayor: Tumisang R. Gaoraelwe

Area
  - Total: 5,635 km^{2} (2,176 sq mi)

Population (2011)
  - Total: 177,642
  - Density: 31.52/km^{2} (81.65/sq mi)

Racial makeup (2011)
  - Black African: 98.2%
  - Coloured: 1.0%
  - Indian/Asian: 0.2%
  - White: 0.4%

First languages (2011)
  - Tswana: 90.3%
  - Xhosa: 1.7%
  - Sotho: 1.5%
  - English: 1.5%
  - Other: 5%
- Time zone: UTC+2 (SAST)
- Municipal code: NW394

Greater Taung Municipality (Tswana: Mmasepala wa Greater Taung) is a local municipality within the Dr Ruth Segomotsi Mompati District Municipality, in the North West province of South Africa. The seat of the municipality is Taung.

== Main places ==
The 2001 census divided the municipality into the following main places:

Place	Code	Area (km^{2})	Population	Most spoken language
Batlhaping Ba Ga Maidi	61401	483.38	26,424	Tswana
Batlhaping Ba Ga Mothibi	61402	811.50	30,810	Tswana
Batlhaping Ba Ga Phuduhutswana	61403	1,193.50	107,870	Tswana
Batlhaping Ba Ga Phudutswana	61404	2.76	3,337	Tswana
Boipelo	61405	3.81	3,568	Tswana
Motsweding	61407	9.55	3,255	Tswana
Pudimoe	61408	2.80	3,718	Tswana
Reivilo	61409	27.28	21	Tswana
Remainder of the municipality	61406	3,106.08	3,159	Tswana

== Politics ==
The municipal council consists of forty-seven members elected by mixed-member proportional representation. Twenty-four councillors are elected by first-past-the-post voting in twenty-four wards, while the remaining twenty-three are chosen from party lists so that the total number of party representatives is proportional to the number of votes received.

In the election of 4 November 2026 the African National Congress (ANC) retained its majority, winning twenty-four seats.

The following table shows the results of the election.

Party	Ward			List			Total seats
Party	Votes	%	Seats	Votes	%	Seats	Total seats
African National Congress	23,321	45.45	24	23,829	46.71	0	24
Economic Freedom Fighters	8,560	16.68	0	8,727	17.11	7	7
ActionSA	4,027	7.85	0	4,258	8.35	4	4
South African Communist Party	3,981	7.76	0	3,883	7.61	3	3
Democratic Alliance	3,636	7.09	0	3,683	7.22	3	3
Active Citizenry Taung Association	890	1.73	0	903	1.77	1	1
African Congress for Transformation	847	1.65	0	869	1.70	1	1
Patriotic Alliance	787	1.53	0	785	1.54	1	1
Alliance for Social Equity	878	1.71	0	655	1.28	1	1
African Independent Congress	747	1.46	0	498	0.98	1	1
uMkhonto weSizwe Party	530	1.03	0	618	1.21	1	1
Independent candidates	984	1.92	0				0
10 other parties	2,119	4.13	0	2,312	4.53	0	0
Total	51,307	100.00	24	51,020	100.00	23	47
Valid votes	51,307	96.87		51,020	96.64		
Invalid/blank votes	1,656	3.13		1,773	3.36		
Total votes	52,963	100.00		52,793	100.00		
Registered voters/turnout	99,716	53.11		99,716	52.94		
