= Dr Ruth Segomotsi Mompati District Municipality =

Coordinates: 26°40′S 24°15′E

Dr Ruth Segomotsi Mompati
- District municipality
- Seal

- Location in South Africa
- Country: South Africa
- Province: North West
- Seat: Vryburg
- Local municipalities: List: Naledi; Mamusa; Greater Taung; Lekwa-Teemane; Kagisano/Molopo

Government
  - Type: Municipal council
  - Mayor: Tebogo Babuile (EFF)

Area
  - Total: 43,700 km^{2} (16,900 sq mi)

Population (2011)
  - Total: 463,815
  - Density: 10.6/km^{2} (27.5/sq mi)

Racial makeup (2011)
  - Black African: 91.4%
  - Coloured: 4.0%
  - Indian/Asian: 0.4%
  - White: 3.9%

First languages (2011)
  - Tswana: 83.6%
  - Afrikaans: 7.6%
  - English: 1.9%
  - Sotho: 1.8%
  - Other: 5.1%
- Time zone: UTC+2 (SAST)
- Municipal code: DC39
- Website: drrsmdm.gov.za

The Dr Ruth Segomotsi Mompati District Municipality (Tswana: Mmasepala wa Sedika wa Dr Ruth Segomotsi Mompati), formerly the Bophirima District Municipality, is one of the 4 districts of the North West province of South Africa. The seat of the municipality is Vryburg. As of 2011, the majority of its 439,637 residents speak Setswana. The district code is DC39. It is South Africa's largest beef producing district, with Hereford cattle the most popular. It is sometimes called "the Texas of South Africa". Maize and peanuts are important crops produced in the district. The district was renamed after the former Mayor of Vryburg, Ruth Mompati.

== Geography ==
=== Neighbours ===
Mompati District is surrounded (clockwise) by:

- the republic of Botswana to the north
- Ngaka Modiri Molema District Municipality to the north-east
- Dr Kenneth Kaunda District Municipality to the south-east
- Lejweleputswa District Municipality (Free State province) to the south-east
- Frances Baard District Municipality (Northern Cape province) to the south
- Kgalagadi District Municipality (Northern Cape province) to the west

=== Local municipalities ===
The district contains the following 5 local municipalities:

Local municipality	Population	%	Dominant language
Greater Taung	177 642	38.30%	Tswana
Kagisano-Molopo	105 789	22.81%	Tswana
Naledi	66 781	14.40%	Tswana
Mamusa	60 355	13.01%	Tswana
Lekwa-Teemane	53 248	11.48%	Tswana

== Demographics ==
The following statistics are from the 2011 census.

Language	Population	%
Tswana	384 956	83.60%
Afrikaans	35 213	7.65%
English	8 696	1.89%
Sotho	8 118	1.76%
Xhosa	7 092	1.54%
Ndebele	4 310	0.94%
Other	4 287	0.93%
Zulu	3 964	0.86%
Sign language	1 766	0.38%
Northern Sotho	1 211	0.26%
Tsonga	481	0.10%
Venda	214	0.05%
Swati	155	0.03%

=== Gender ===
Gender	Population	%
Female	239,097	51.55%
Male	224,718	48.45%

=== Ethnic group ===
Ethnic group	Population	%
Black African	423,980	91.41%
Coloured	18,346	3.96%
White	18,127	3.91%
Indian/Asian	1,358	0.43%

=== Age ===
Age	Population	%
000 - 004	50 051	11.38%
005 - 009	55 303	12.58%
010 - 014	56 825	12.93%
015 - 019	52 129	11.86%
020 - 024	38 481	8.75%
025 - 029	31 184	7.09%
030 - 034	26 780	6.09%
035 - 039	25 234	5.74%
040 - 044	22 162	5.04%
045 - 049	18 354	4.17%
050 - 054	14 801	3.37%
055 - 059	12 882	2.93%
060 - 064	10 892	2.48%
065 - 069	8 520	1.94%
070 - 074	6 443	1.47%
075 - 079	4 755	1.08%
080 - 084	2 993	0.68%
085 - 089	1 124	0.26%
090 - 094	469	0.11%
095 - 099	190	0.04%
100 plus	65	0.01%

== Politics ==
=== Election results ===
Election results for Mompati District in the South African general election, 2004.

- Population 18 and over: 245 386 (55.82% of total population)
- Total votes: 153 517 (34.92% of total population)
- Voting % estimate: 62.56% votes as a % of population 18 and over

Party	Votes	%
African National Congress	124 832	81.31%
United Christian Democratic Party	14 626	9.53%
Democratic Alliance	4 866	3.17%
African Christian Democratic Party	1 708	1.11%
Pan African Congress	1 531	1.00%
Freedom Front Plus	1 473	0.96%
Independent Democrats	938	0.61%
United Democratic Movement	777	0.51%
New National Party	673	0.44%
Azanian People's Organisation	586	0.38%
EMSA	254	0.17%
Inkhata Freedom Party	247	0.16%
SOPA	217	0.14%
PJC	141	0.09%
NA	135	0.09%
CDP	130	0.08%
UF	130	0.08%
TOP	111	0.07%
NLP	56	0.04%
KISS	48	0.03%
Minority Front	38	0.02%
Total	153 517	100.00%

Results From Local Government Election 2021

Dr Ruth Segomotsi Mompati - Municipal election results

Party Name	Abbr.	Total Valid Votes	% TotalValid Votes
African National Congress	ANC	60 757	60,43%
Economic Freedom Fighters	EFF	20 703	20,59%
Democratic Alliance	DA	5 743	5,71%
Azanian Independent Community Movement	AICM	4 127	4,10%
Forum 4 Service Delivery	F4SD	2 741	2,73%
Vryheidsfront Plus	VF PLUS	2 450	2,44%
United Christian Democratic Party	UCDP	1 182	1,18%
Congress of the People	COPE	669	0,67%
Patriotic Alliance	PA	639	0,64%
African Christian Democratic Party	ACDP	608	0,60%
African Transformation Movement	ATM	462	0,46%
Inkatha Freedom Party	IFP	458	0,46%
Total Valid Votes		100 539	100,00%

== Corruption ==
In November 2023, the municipality was reported as having spent R38 million on a call centre, which included highly inflated prices for equipment, such as a recurring monthly fee of R469 per mouse, an item which would cost around R300 to purchase.
