= Matlwang =

South African village

Matlwang Village
- Location within North West (South African province) Location within South Africa
- Coordinates: 26.745°S 26.931°E
- Country: South Africa
- Province: North West
- District: Dr Kenneth Kaunda
- Municipality: JB Marks

Area
  - Total: 6.06 km^{2} (2.34 sq mi)

Population (2011)
  - Total: 782
  - Density: 129/km^{2} (334/sq mi)

Racial makeup (2011)
  - Black African: 98.7%
  - Coloured: 0.8%
  - Indian/Asian: 0.3%
  - White: 0.3%

First languages (2011)
  - Tswana: 65.9%
  - Xhosa: 16.6%
  - Sotho: 10.6%
  - Zulu: 3.7%
  - Other: 3.2%
- Time zone: UTC+2 (SAST)

Matlwang Village also known on Weather Services as Matlwang A is a small rural village west of Potchefstroom, North West province in South Africa.
