= Doornkop, North West =

Doornkop
- Location within North West (South African province) Location within South Africa
- Coordinates: 26°10′28″S 26°47′51″E
- Country: South Africa
- Province: North West
- District: Dr Kenneth Kaunda
- Municipality: JB Marks

Area
  - Total: 1.08 km^{2} (0.42 sq mi)

Population (2011)
  - Total: 1,718
  - Density: 1,590/km^{2} (4,120/sq mi)

Racial makeup (2011)
  - Black African: 97.8%
  - Coloured: 1.9%
  - Indian/Asian: 0.3%

First languages (2011)
  - Tswana: 89.0%
  - Afrikaans: 3.0%
  - English: 2.3%
  - Xhosa: 1.9%
  - Other: 3.7%
- Time zone: UTC+2 (SAST)
- Postal code (street): 2710
- PO box: 2710
- Area code: 018

Doornkop is a 98% Black African village in Dr Kenneth Kaunda District Municipality, North West Province, South Africa. It is situated approximately 18 km north of Ventersdorp.
