= Makokskraal =

- Location within North West (South African province) Location within South Africa
- Coordinates: 26°20′21″S 26°37′43″E
- Country: South Africa
- Province: North West
- District: Dr Kenneth Kaunda
- Municipality: JB Marks

Area
  - Total: 1.79 km^{2} (0.69 sq mi)

Population (2011)
  - Total: 166
  - Density: 92.7/km^{2} (240/sq mi)

Racial makeup (2011)
  - Black African: 81.3%
  - Coloured: 2.4%
  - White: 16.3%

First languages (2011)
  - Tswana: 75.3%
  - Afrikaans: 16.9%
  - Zulu: 6.0%
  - English: 1.2%
  - Other: 0.6%
- Time zone: UTC+2 (SAST)
- Postal code (street): 2710
- PO box: 2710
- Area code: 018

Makokskraal is an 81% Black African village in Dr Kenneth Kaunda District Municipality, North West Province, South Africa.
