= Bruidegomskraal =

- Location within North West (South African province) Location within South Africa
- Coordinates: 26°10′58″S 26°54′47″E
- Country: South Africa
- Province: North West
- District: Dr Kenneth Kaunda
- Municipality: JB Marks

Area
  - Total: 1.22 km^{2} (0.47 sq mi)

Population (2011)
  - Total: 2,292
  - Density: 1,880/km^{2} (4,870/sq mi)

Racial makeup (2011)
  - Black African: 99.1%
  - Coloured: 0.6%
  - Indian/Asian: 0.1%
  - Other: 0.1%

First languages (2011)
  - Tswana: 83.8%
  - Xhosa: 7.0%
  - English: 2.5%
  - Zulu: 1.6%
  - Other: 5.1%
- Time zone: UTC+2 (SAST)
- Postal code (street): 2710
- PO box: 2710
- Area code: 018

Bruidegomskraal is a 99% Black African village in Dr Kenneth Kaunda District Municipality, North West Province, South Africa. It is situated north of Ventersdorp on the R30 road to Derby.
