= GaMogopa =

- Location within North West (South African province) Location within South Africa
- Coordinates: 26°6′12″S 26°49′30″E
- Country: South Africa
- Province: North West
- District: Dr Kenneth Kaunda
- Municipality: JB Marks

Area
  - Total: 2.51 km^{2} (0.97 sq mi)

Population (2011)
  - Total: 2,856
  - Density: 1,140/km^{2} (2,950/sq mi)

Racial makeup (2011)
  - Black African: 98.7%
  - Coloured: 0.8%
  - White: 0.2%
  - Other: 0.2%

First languages (2011)
  - Tswana: 91.2%
  - Sotho: 2.6%
  - English: 2.0%
  - Xhosa: 1.4%
  - Other: 2.9%
- Time zone: UTC+2 (SAST)
- Area code: 018

GaMogopa is a 99% Black African village in Dr Kenneth Kaunda District Municipality, North West Province, South Africa. It is situated 25 km north of Ventersdorp.
