= Appeldraai =

- Location within North West (South African province) Location within South Africa
- Coordinates: 26°13′40″S 26°50′24″E
- Country: South Africa
- Province: North West
- District: Dr Kenneth Kaunda
- Municipality: JB Marks

Area
  - Total: 0.47 km^{2} (0.18 sq mi)

Population (2011)
  - Total: 573
  - Density: 1,200/km^{2} (3,200/sq mi)

Racial makeup (2011)
  - Black African: 100.0%

First languages (2011)
  - Tswana: 72.3%
  - Xhosa: 16.8%
  - Afrikaans: 5.9%
  - Sotho: 3.3%
  - Other: 1.7%
- Time zone: UTC+2 (SAST)
- Postal code (street): 2710
- PO box: 2710
- Area code: 018

Appeldraai is a 100% Black African village in Dr Kenneth Kaunda District Municipality, North West Province, South Africa.
