= List of elevator accidents =

This is a list of elevator accidents by death toll. It does not include accidents involving gondola lifts, ski lifts or similar types of cable transport.

== List ==
Deaths	Injuries	Date	Incident	Location
104	0	1995-05-10	In the Vaal Reefs mining disaster, a locomotive crashed through a safety barrier and fell into a mine shaft, hitting an elevator which was carrying 104 workers and causing it to plunge to the bottom of the shaft.	Orkney, South Africa
62	0	1987-08-31	A methane gas explosion at the St. Helena gold mine severed the cable of a double-deck elevator, causing it to fall 1.4 kilometers to the bottom of the mine shaft, killing all 52 people on board. 10 others who were not in the elevator were killed in the explosion.	Welkom, South Africa
31	0	1980-03-27	A descending elevator became stuck in the Vaal Reefs mine shaft and then fell to the bottom of the shaft when it abruptly became unstuck, killing all 31 miners on board.	Orkney, South Africa
19	1	1932-10-10	A mine-shaft elevator carrying 20 people fell at the Bickershaw Colliery, killing all but one person.	Leigh, England
19	0	2012-09-13	An elevator fell about 100 meters at a construction site, killing everyone on board.	Wuhan, China
18	11	1973-07-30	A mine-shaft elevator fell at the Markham Colliery.	Chesterfield, England
16	0	1918-09-10	Protection Island mining disaster: A mine-shaft elevator cable snapped causing the elevator to plunge to the bottom of the mine.	Protection Island, Canada
13	73	2023-11-27	A mine elevator fell 200 m in the Impala Platinum mine shaft accident.	Rustenburg, South Africa
12	0	1993-06-02	An elevator plunged to the ground from the 20th floor at a construction site.	North Point, Hong Kong
12	0	2008-10-30	An elevator plunged to the ground at a construction site.	Xiapu County, China
11	4	2011-07-29	A mine-shaft elevator fell at the Bazhanov coal mine.	Makiivka, Ukraine
11	2	2019-04-25	An elevator fell at a construction site due to a snapped cable.	Hengshui, China
10	5	1964-03-27	A steel cable hit a mine-shaft elevator at the Sachsen coal mine, killing 10 workers, including 5 Turkish nationals.	Heeßen, Germany
10	0	2014-09-06	An elevator plunged 32 stories at a construction site.	Istanbul, Turkey
9	0	2011-08-09	An elevator fell from the 22nd floor at a building under construction due to a snapped cable.	Salvador de Bahia, Brazil
8–10	0-2	1904-01-13	A crowd of employees at a Brown Shoe Company factory was waiting for the elevator when someone raised the gate, causing 10 people to fall down the shaft. At least 8 people were killed and two others suffered fatal injuries.	St. Louis, Missouri, U.S.
8	0	2016-07-15	A construction elevator fell from the 18th story of an apartment building under construction.	Longkou, China
7	0	1989-05-21	An elevator fell at the Príncipes de España Hospital, killing 7 visitors.	L'Hospitalet de Llobregat, Spain
6	1	2019-12-31	A temporary elevator at an under-construction tower at a farmhouse fell from a height of 30 metres (98 ft) when the cable broke during a New Year's Eve party. A businessman and five members of his family were killed. Another relative was critically injured.	Patalpani, Madhya Pradesh, India
6	0	2017-01-05	Six men fell out of a mine-shaft elevator due to a broken control switch.	Mogok Township. Myanmar
6	0	2018-09-04	An elevator fell about 20 stories at a construction site.	Tehran, Iran
6	0	2019-03-09	A construction elevator fell from the 15th floor.	Karachi, Pakistan
5	12+	1957-03-20	A construction elevator carrying 21 people plunged five floors when the cable broke.	Jacksonville, Florida, U.S.
5	0	1999-09-07	An elevator carrying 5 painters fell from the 10th floor at an apartment building under construction, killing everyone on board.	Yongin, South Korea
5	0	2009-04-02	Workers fell from an elevator at a construction site.	Laiwu, China
5	0	2023-09-01	Five hotel employees were killed when the cable of an inclined elevator they were on snapped, causing the lift to fall down 100 metres (330 ft) into a ravine. The victims were brought to a hospital, but all died during or shortly after the incident.	Ubud, Bali, Indonesia
5	0	2023-12-11	Five construction workers were killed when a construction-site elevator failed and fell 20 m (66 ft) to the ground.	Stockholm, Sweden
4	14	1903-05-22	An elevator at the Donnelly Building fell from the 5th or 6th floor when the steel cable snapped, causing it to crash through the floor above the basement. It was caused by overloading and the elevator had an insufficient capacity. No charges were filed.	Pittsburgh, Pennsylvania, U.S.
4	3	1909-03-25	An elevator fell about 60 feet (18 m) at a wool warehouse at St Katharine Docks	London, England
4	3	1938-04	A mine-shaft elevator fell 800 feet (244 m) at a gold mine.	Beardmore, Ontario, Canada
4	1	2018-09-04	An elevator fell from the sixth floor of a hotel under construction. Overload of people and construction materials was blamed for the accident.	Pailin Province, Cambodia
4	0	1958-04-16	An elevator at a dam at the Snowy Mountains Scheme fell about 400 feet (122 m) when the cable broke, killing 4 Italian employees of a French construction firm.	Near Cabramurra, Australia
4	0	1973-04-12	A flash fire swept through an elevator at the Sears Tower, killing four elevator mechanics who were using cleaning fluid to rub down elevator guide rails.	Chicago, Illinois, U.S.
4	0	2019-12-30	An elevator at a Brazilian Navy apartment building fell from the 9th floor when the cabin became detached from the cable system, killing four members of a family.	Santos, São Paulo, Brazil
3	7	1932-09	An elevator fell 150 feet (46 m) down a shaft when the cable broke.	Chicago, Illinois, U.S.
3	3	2019-08-14	An elevator carrying 4 workers fell from the 15th floor at an apartment building under construction, killing 3 of them and seriously injuring the 4th. Two workers on the ground were also injured.	Sokcho, South Korea
3	2+	1892-03-15	Workers at a boiler factory were using a freight elevator to lift heavy machinery when the rope broke. Three workers were killed instantly and two others suffered fatal injuries. Several others suffered minor injuries.	St. Louis, Missouri, U.S.
2	16	1920-08-29	An elevator plunged from the 10th floor at the Clarendon Building when the main cable broke.	New York City, New York, U.S.
2	11	1902-10	An elevator fell at a shoe factory.	Lynn, Massachusetts, U.S.
2	10	1946-12-11	An elevator dropped 35 feet (11 m) at the American Woolen Company Foxcroft Mill, after which the cables and other items crashed through the roof.	Dover-Foxcroft, Maine, U.S.
2	6	1904-09	A freight elevator carrying ten people fell three stories at a Sears store. The freight elevator was being used because the passenger elevator was out of service for repairs.	Chicago, Illinois, U.S.
2	6	2023-02-17	Two labourers were killed and six others injured when a cargo lift collapsed inside a cold storage facility in Chitra GIDC in Bhavnagar, Gujarat	Bhavnagar, India
2	2	2020-01-01	Four people were in an elevator at an apartment building when it lost power as a result of a fire on the ground floor. The elevator stopped and the cabin filled with smoke, rendering the victims unconscious. A 39-year-old man and his 4-year-old son were killed, while the 36-year-old mother and the couple's 8-year-old daughter were seriously injured. The fire was likely caused by fireworks and two boys, aged 12 and 13, were arrested on suspicion of arson.	Arnhem, Netherlands
2	1	1987-08-29	A mechanical fault caused a construction elevator at Scotia Plaza to hurtle upwards at 100 km/h, killing two workers and seriously injuring another when it crashed at the top.	Toronto, Canada
2	0	1999-05-13	An elevator plunged four or five floors at a warehouse, killing two maintenance workers who were trying to take the elevator out of service.	South Kearny, New Jersey, U.S.
2	0	2002-08-23	A temporary elevator fell 19 floors at an office tower under construction.	New York City, New York, U.S.
2	0	2017-05-09	The floor of an elevator gave way between the 6th and 9th floor of an apartment building, causing two teenagers to fall down the elevator shaft.	Madrid, Spain
2	0	2020-01-04	A young couple drowned in a flooded elevator in south Tel Aviv during heavy rainfall.	Tel Aviv, Israel
2	0	2023-03-18	Two construction workers were killed when a lift carrying them collapsed from the 16th floor to the ground due to a technical error.	Vijayawada, India
1	15	2023-10-26	An elevator at a student dormitory in Aydın, crashed to the ground, killing student Zeren Ertaş and injuring 15 others.	Aydın, Turkey
1	5	2019-08-22	In the lobby of a luxury high-rise building in New York City, a 30-year old man was crushed to death between an elevator car and the shaft wall when it unexpectedly plunged downwards while residents were attempting to enter and exit. Five other people who remained trapped in the car were injured.	New York City, United States
1	0	2012-06-25	An office building elevator started moving while an employee was holding the door with his leg.	Tel Aviv, Israel
1	0	2014-09-14	An elevator began moving at the moment an architecture student began to board, pinning him between the elevator floor and ceiling of the floor he was departing.	Xiamen, China
1	0	2015-12-27	After disabling the elevator's safety system, an electrician working aboard the Carnival Ecstasy cruise ship was crushed to death between the elevator car and the wall of the shaft while performing maintenance.	Miami, United States
1	0	2018-9-24	An elderly man walked into an empty elevator shaft and fell 8 meters to his death, allegedly thinking it had arrived after his son-in-law used the elevator key to see where the car was in the shaft.	Qiandongnan Miao and Dong Autonomous Prefecture, China
1	0	2022-09-16	A 26-year-old teacher from Vasai, Palghar succumbed to injuries, in an elevator accident of the St. Mary's School, Malad, Mumbai.	Mumbai, India
1	0	2022-10-02	A 74-year-old man was severely injured in an elevator of a housing society in Borivali, Mumbai. He died due to injuries on 11 October, 2022.	Mumbai, India
1	0	2023-03-19	A 29-year-old man died after an open lift of a building allegedly malfunctioned in central Delhi's Kamla Market	Delhi, India
1	0	2023-07-18	While removing asbestos from the former AT&T building in Kansas City, Jose Rodolfo Garcia-Sanches fell 14 stories down an elevator shaft to his death.	Kansas City, Missouri, United States
1	0	2023-08-01	An elevator at Lagos Island General Hospital, Odan, crashed to the ground, killing doctor Vwaere Diaso.	Lagos, Nigeria
1	0	2025-08-26	Eric Bartram, an electrician at a coal processing facility, was troubleshooting a malfunctioning elevator when he became pinned between it and the first-floor platform and died.	Whitesville, West Virginia, United States
0	1	2022-11-01	A 16-year-old girl was severely injured in an elevator when her head was stuck in a small opening of a lift door.	Mumbai, India
0	1	2024-03-21	A 67-year old man was severely injured when a hydraulic elevator plunged two floors due to a mechanical failure.	Neustadt an der Aisch, Germany
0	1	2026-08-03	A construction worker at a Google data center was entrapped in an elevator and hospitalized with injuries.	Council Bluffs, Iowa, United States
0	1	2026-09-18	Someone fell into an open elevator shaft from an upper floor and had to be rescued from the elevator pit; they were then taken to a hospital in serious condition.	Branson, Missouri, United States

== Other notable accidents ==
- On 14 December 1883, in one of the earliest documented elevator accidents, a 15-year-old boy was decapitated by an elevator at a furniture warehouse in Baltimore, Maryland.
- On 20 May 1905, three elevator accidents occurred in New York City within the span of a few hours, killing two men and one woman.
- On 28 July 1945, a USAAF bomber crashed into the Empire State Building in New York City, causing an elevator to fall 75 stories (more than 300 meters or 1,000 feet). Elevator operator Betty Lou Oliver was injured but survived. It remains the Guinness World Record for the longest fall survived in an elevator.
- On 20 June 1973, former Australian member of parliament Dugald Munro was crushed to death in an elevator accident, aged 43. He was trapped between the lift cage and door in a building in Bridge Street, Sydney, and was unable to be freed.
- On May 14, 1986, WJJS news radio reporter Ron Lee Alexander was one of seven people who jumped off an elevator in the Allied Arts Building in Lynchburg, Virginia, after it stopped between the 5th and 6th floors. About 300 pounds, he was the last to jump. When he did, the car shot upward and he fatally stumbled backward into the shaft.
- On September 29, 1991, 62-year-old Irene Sullivan was tragically killed when an Otis elevator in the JCPenney parking garage malfunctioned and moved unexpectedly while she was boarding. The elevator car began to rise with the doors still open, pinning and crushing her against the shaft in full view of other passengers, including her sister. Investigations later revealed that safety circuits had been improperly bypassed with "jumpers" to keep the aging machinery running, leading to a major negligence lawsuit and a permanent reputation for the elevators being "death traps".
- On January 7, 1995, a man was decapitated by a malfunctioning elevator in New York City.
- In October 1999, a brief power dip caused an elevator to stop between the 13th and 14th floors at the McGraw-Hill Building in New York City, trapping Nicholas White, an employee of the building who was going down to take a cigarette break. Despite activating an alarm and the presence of a surveillance camera, nearly 41 hours passed before he was noticed and rescued. Years later, the surveillance video was made public.
- On August 16, 2003, Dr. Hitoshi Nikaidoh, a surgical resident at a Texas hospital, became trapped between the doors of a hospital elevator when faulty wiring caused them to suddenly close. When the elevator rose, Nikaidoh's head was severed above the jaw.
- On May 24, 2003, a woman was beheaded in an accident with a cargo lift that occurred at a supermarket in Nerja, Malaga, Spain. The victim, a worker for a company in charge of cleaning the establishment, put the car with her tools in the cargolift and went to an upper floor to collect it by inserting her head into the elevator shaft, at the time of the accident. The Local Police tried to locate a client of foreign nationality who allegedly witnessed the accident and left the establishment, prey to an anxiety attack.
- On November 8, 2009, Jerry Fuchs was caught in a broken elevator in Williamsburg, Brooklyn, New York City. When assistance arrived and the doors were pried open, he attempted to jump out of the elevator car. Upon landing, his hood caught on something, pulling him off balance, and he accidentally fell to his death down the elevator shaft.
- In December 2011, an elevator in New York City suddenly ascended while Suzanne Hart, a director for an advertising agency, was boarding. She was crushed to death almost instantly. Investigations later revealed that the elevator was undergoing maintenance and was switched back to "automatic" mode while a jumper cable bypassed the safety circuits, resulting in the elevator ascending with the doors open.
- In April 2013, an elevator broke down at Hotel Eden in Bad Gastein, Austria, trapping the owner inside. He was rescued after four days.
- On 15 May 2013, a 24-year-old nurse was decapitated by an elevator at a hospital in Shenzhen, China. As she tried to exit the elevator on the third floor, it suddenly plunged down to the building's basement and caught her between the doors. Eleven other people were trapped inside and tried to free the woman, but it was too late. They were all rescued shortly after the gruesome incident.
- On August 3, 2013, Bob Reuter, a musician and host of the KDHX (88.1 FM) weekly radio program “Bob’s Scratchy Records,” died after falling down an elevator shaft while moving into a downtown loft. Police said he opened the door to the elevator, which is nearly 100 years old, and stepped into the shaft, falling an estimated 18 feet to his death.
- On 7 June 2014, 31-year-old José Vergara Acevedo was seriously injured at an apartment building in Providencia, Chile, when an elevator he was riding soared up 31 floors in 15 seconds before crashing into the building's roof.
- On 14 September 2014, a malfunctioning elevator in Xiamen, China ascended while a Huaqiao University student was getting inside, pinning him between the floor of the elevator and the top of its door frame. When Chinese authorities were able to remove him nearly half an hour later, he was pronounced dead, apparently having suffocated due to the force of the elevator against his body.
- On December 31, 2015, Stephen Hewett-Brown, an aspiring musician, pushed a woman out of a New York apartment building elevator as it slipped and pinned him between the ceiling of the car and the building’s third floor. He later died from his injuries.
- On 1 March 2016, a 43-year-old woman was found starved to death inside an elevator at an apartment building in the Chinese city of Xi’an. She was overlooked when maintenance men examined the broken elevator and cut off the power to it. When they returned more than a month later, the woman's body was found. The incident sparked outrage over the apparent negligence of the men, who were charged with involuntary manslaughter. At least one of them was detained.
- On 17 March 2017, an elevator plunged 4 floors (5th floor to basement floor) at Blok M Square in Jakarta after the cable snapped. Due to the incident, 25 people were injured.
- On 16 November 2018, an elevator plunged 84 floors (95th floor to 11th floor) at the 100-story John Hancock Center in Chicago after two of the cables holding the lift snapped, but no one was injured or killed.
- On 22 August 2019, 30-year-old Samuel Waisbren was crushed to death at an apartment building in New York City when the elevator which he was trying to exit suddenly descended. Five other people were trapped in the elevator and were later rescued by firefighters. One man had exited the elevator just before it gave way.
- On 14 September 2020, 38-year-old Boston University lecturer Carrie O'Connor was crushed to death at an apartment building in Boston when the elevator suddenly descended, trapping her in the doorway.

== See also ==
- 2006 Minato Ward elevator accident

=== Other List of Elevators ===
- List of elevator manufacturers
