= Impala Platinum mine shaft accident =

2023 mineshaft accident at Impala Platinum mine in South Africa

- Date: 27 November 2023
- Location: Rustenburg, South Africa
- Cause: Falling mine elevator
- Casualties: 13 dead, 73 injured

An elevator accident occurred on 27 November 2023 at the Impala Platinum mine in Rustenburg, South Africa, when an ascending mine elevator fell 200 m down the number 11 shaft. Thirteen miners were killed, 11 on the scene and two dying in hospital later, and 73 were injured. The elevator was stopped from falling further by its impacting with a platform within the shaft, resulting in a sudden stop which led to the fatalities.

== See also ==
- Vaal Reefs mining disaster, a 1995 mine elevator accident in South Africa which was the world's worst, with a death toll of 104.
