= JB Marks Local Municipality elections =

Local elections in the North West Province, South Africa

The JB Marks Local Municipality council consists of sixty-seven members elected by mixed-member proportional representation. Thirty-four councillors are elected by first-past-the-post voting in thirty-four wards, while the remaining thirty-three are chosen from party lists so that the total number of party representatives is proportional to the number of votes received.

In the election of 4 November 2026, no party won a majority. The African National Congress (ANC) won the largest number of seats in council, twenty-two.

== Results ==
The following table shows the composition of the council after past elections.

Event	ANC	DA	EFF	FF+	PA	Other	Total
2016 election	34	22	5	4	—	2	67
2021 election	33	17	6	9	2	0	67
2026 election	22	21	5	6	1	12	67

== August 2016 election ==
The following table shows the results of the 2016 election.

Party	Ward			List			Total seats
Party	Votes	%	Seats	Votes	%	Seats	Total seats
African National Congress	33,420	51.02	24	33,269	50.71	10	34
Democratic Alliance	21,009	32.07	10	21,222	32.35	12	22
Economic Freedom Fighters	4,927	7.52	0	4,885	7.45	5	5
Freedom Front Plus	3,586	5.47	0	3,471	5.29	4	4
Independent Councillors	2,101	3.21	0	2,036	3.10	2	2
Congress of the People	21	0.03	0	574	0.87	0	0
Independent candidates	396	0.60	0				0
Pan Africanist Congress of Azania	44	0.07	0	151	0.23	0	0
Total	65,504	100.00	34	65,608	100.00	33	67
Valid votes	65,504	98.25		65,608	97.95		
Invalid/blank votes	1,169	1.75		1,374	2.05		
Total votes	66,673	100.00		66,982	100.00		
Registered voters/turnout	116,321	57.32		116,321	57.58		

== November 2021 election ==
The following table shows the results of the 2021 election.

Party	Ward			List			Total seats
Party	Votes	%	Seats	Votes	%	Seats	Total seats
African National Congress	24,702	48.29	24	24,209	47.72	9	33
Democratic Alliance	12,950	25.31	9	12,887	25.40	8	17
Freedom Front Plus	6,910	13.51	1	6,890	13.58	8	9
Economic Freedom Fighters	4,555	8.90	0	4,645	9.16	6	6
Patriotic Alliance	1,068	2.09	0	1,321	2.60	2	2
Independent candidates	450	0.88	0				0
Black First Land First	228	0.45	0	200	0.39	0	0
Abantu Batho Congress	179	0.35	0	161	0.32	0	0
African Transformation Movement	38	0.07	0	292	0.58	0	0
Forum for Service Delivery	76	0.15	0	128	0.25	0	0
Total	51,156	100.00	34	50,733	100.00	33	67
Valid votes	51,156	98.06		50,733	97.81		
Invalid/blank votes	1,013	1.94		1,136	2.19		
Total votes	52,169	100.00		51,869	100.00		
Registered voters/turnout	113,218	46.08		113,218	45.81		

=== By-elections from November 2021 ===
The following by-elections were held to fill vacant ward seats in the period since the election in November 2021.

Date	Ward	Party of the previous councillor	Party of the newly elected councillor
11 Sep 2024	7	Democratic Alliance	Democratic Alliance
11 Sep 2024	22	Democratic Alliance	Democratic Alliance
11 Sep 2024	24	Democratic Alliance	Democratic Alliance

== November 2026 election ==
The following table shows the results of the 2026 election.

Party	Ward			List			Total seats
Party	Votes	%	Seats	Votes	%	Seats	Total seats
African National Congress	23,121	33.43	22	22,822	32.87	0	22
Democratic Alliance	22,072	31.92	12	21,970	31.65	9	21
Freedom Front Plus	6,365	9.20	0	6,514	9.38	6	6
ActionSA	5,375	7.77	0	5,544	7.99	5	5
Economic Freedom Fighters	5,059	7.32	0	5,014	7.22	5	5
Baagi	3,095	4.48	0	3,218	4.64	3	3
Patriotic Alliance	825	1.19	0	834	1.20	1	1
uMkhonto weSizwe Party	751	1.09	0	869	1.25	1	1
South African Communist Party	716	1.04	0	622	0.90	1	1
Concerned Potchefstroom Residents	444	0.64	0	450	0.65	1	1
African Christian Democratic Party	413	0.60	0	442	0.64	1	1
African Congress for Transformation	240	0.35	0	213	0.31	0	0
Solidarity Action Committee Collective	195	0.28	0	241	0.35	0	0
Afrika Mayibuye Movement	137	0.20	0	140	0.20	0	0
Build One South Africa	151	0.22	0	121	0.17	0	0
Defenders of the People	88	0.13	0	108	0.16	0	0
All Citizens Party	59	0.09	0	83	0.12	0	0
United Africans Transformation	25	0.04	0	105	0.15	0	0
Pan Africanist Congress of Azania	7	0.01	0	81	0.12	0	0
People's Freedom Party	18	0.03	0	32	0.05	0	0
Total	69,156	100.00	34	69,423	100.00	33	67
Valid votes	69,156	98.28		69,423	98.43		
Invalid/blank votes	1,213	1.72		1,108	1.57		
Total votes	70,369	100.00		70,531	100.00		
Registered voters/turnout	131,963	53.32		131,963	53.45		
