= Potchefstroom =

Academic city in North West, South Africa

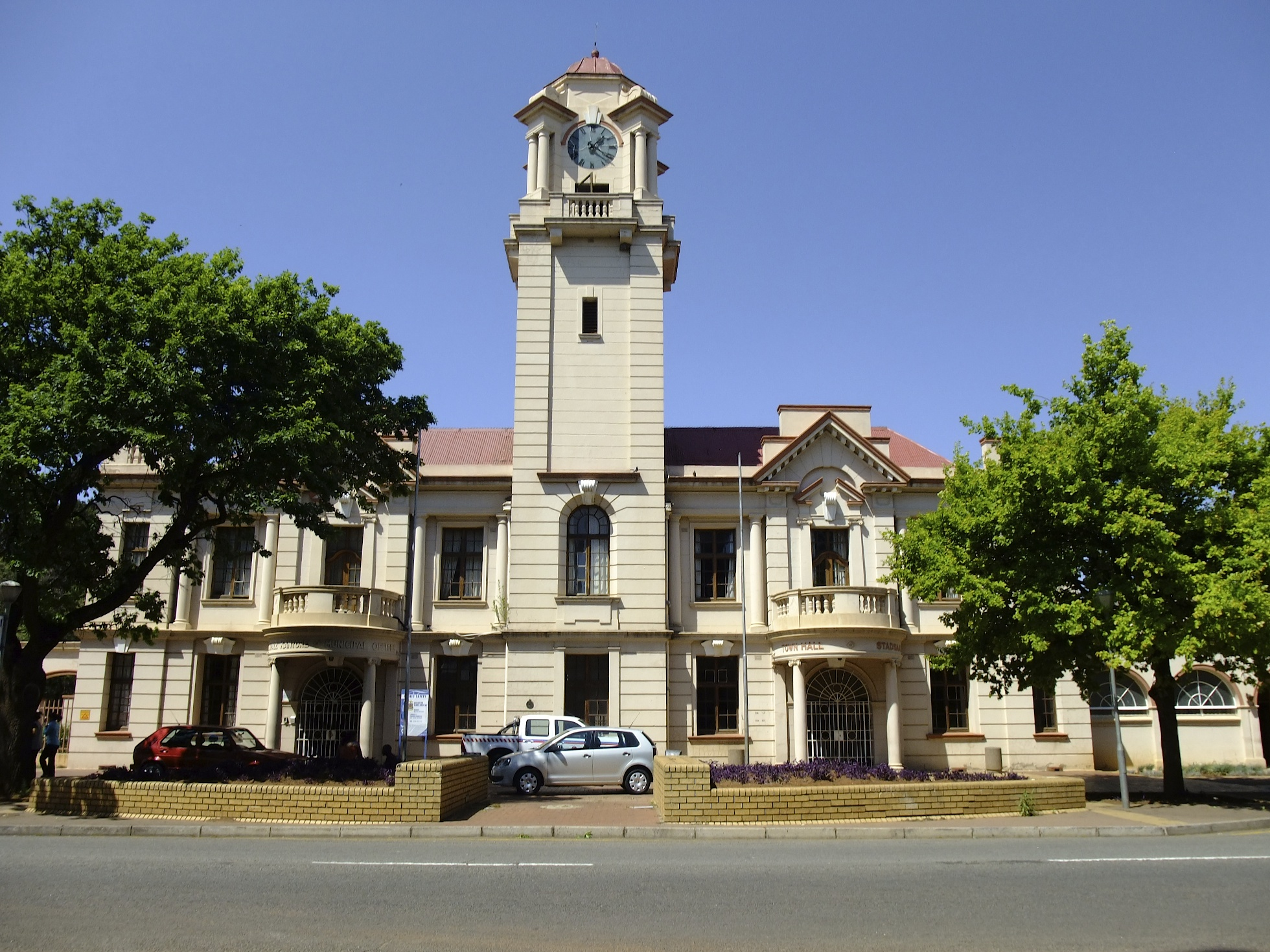
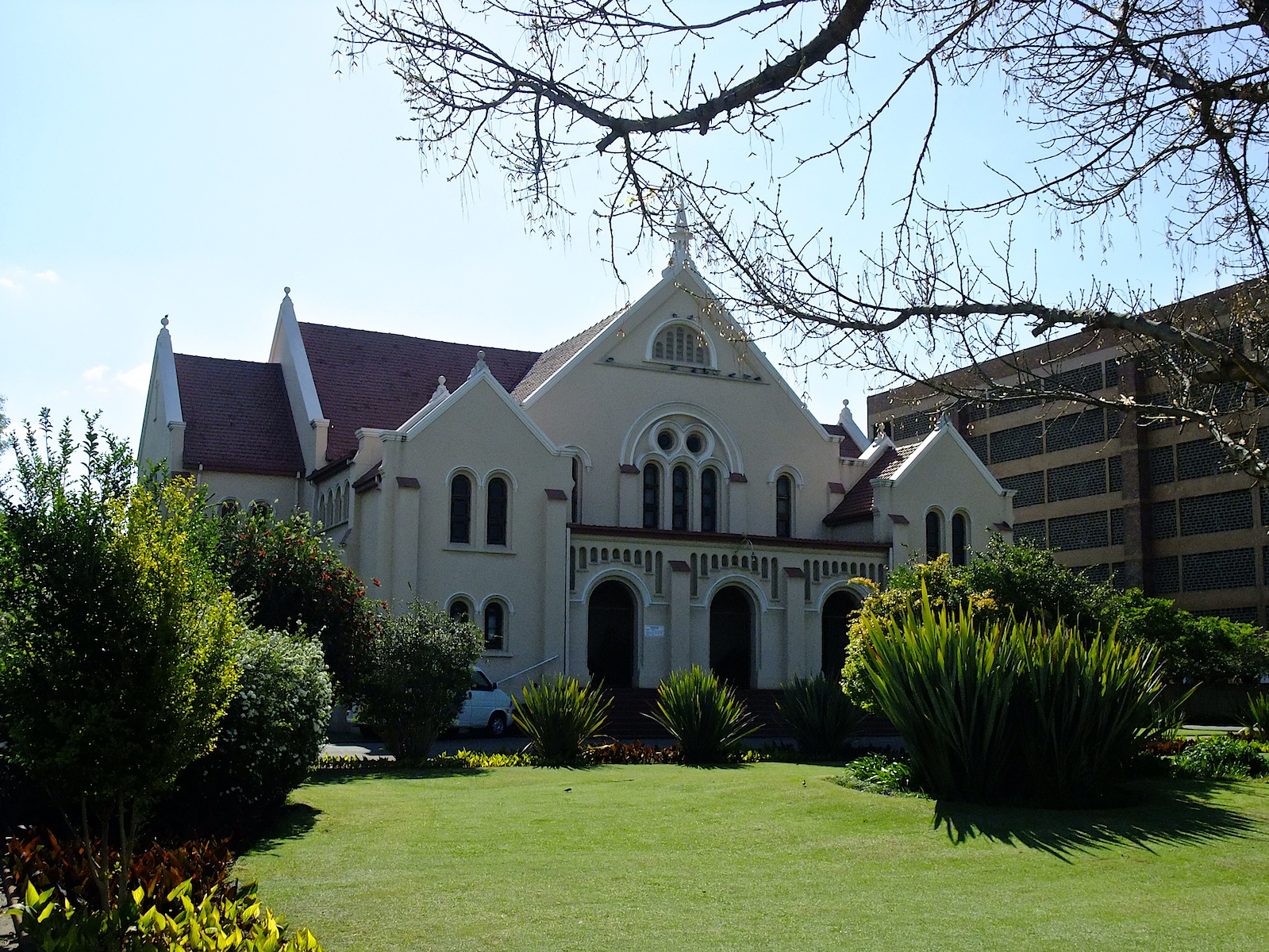
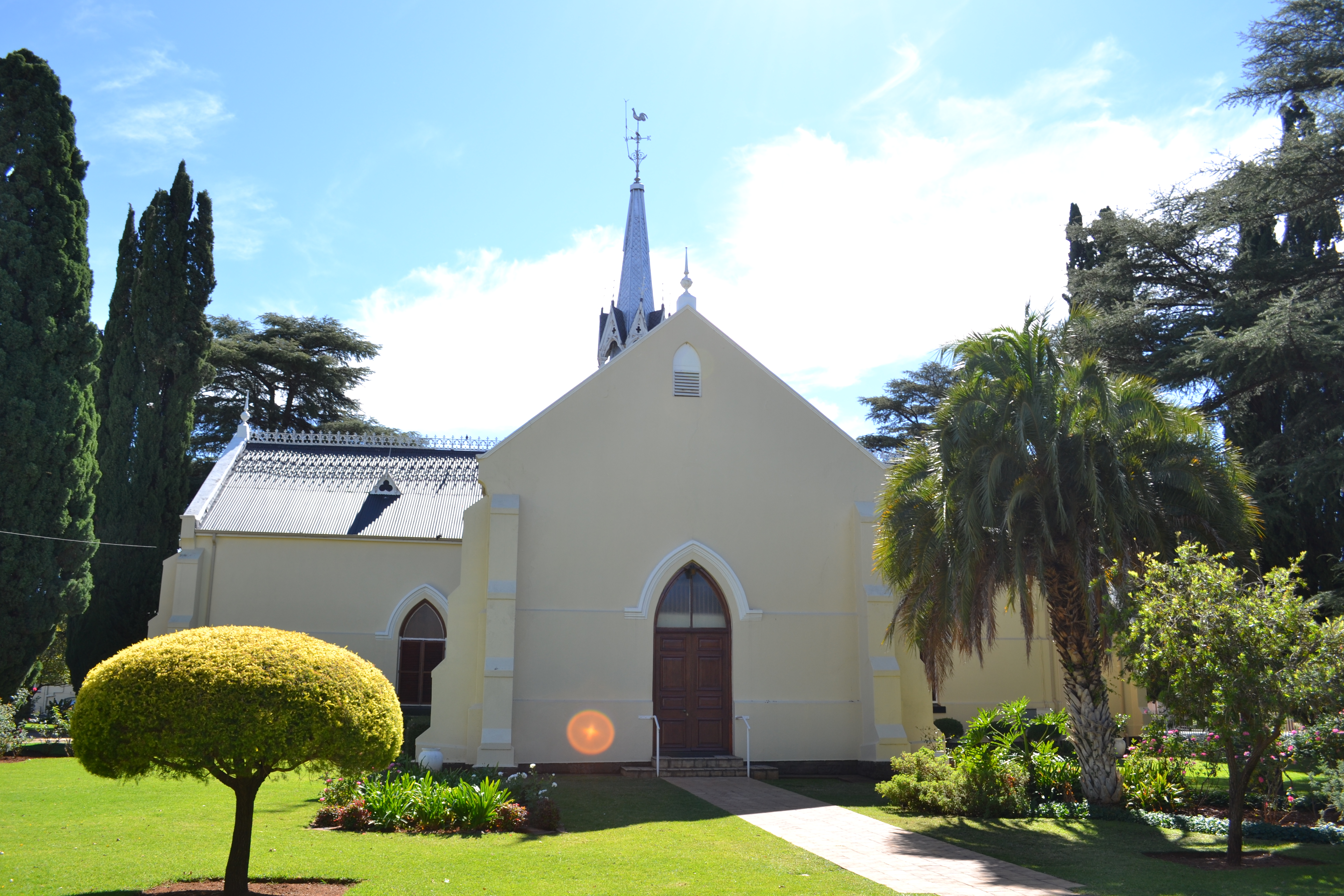
- Clockwise from top: Town Hall (on Potgieter Street), Reformed Church, and Dutch Reformed Church.
- Motto: City of Expertise; Motswe Wa Boitseanape; Stad van Deskundigheid
- Location within North West (South African province) Location within South Africa Location within Africa
- Coordinates: 26°42′54″S 27°06′12″E
- Country: South Africa
- Province: North West
- District: Dr Kenneth Kaunda
- Municipality: JB Marks
- Established: 1838
  - Mayor: (ANC)

Area
  - Total: 162.44 km^{2} (62.72 sq mi)
- Elevation: 1,340 m (4,400 ft)

Population (2011)
  - Total: 43,448
  - Density: 267.47/km^{2} (692.75/sq mi)

Racial makeup (2011)
  - White: 70%
  - Black African: 25.4%
  - Coloured: 2.8%
  - Indian/Asian: 1.3%
  - Other: 0.5%

First languages (2011)
  - Afrikaans: 71.4%
  - Tswana: 11.0%
  - English: 7.6%
  - Sotho: 3.9%
  - Other: 6.1%
- Time zone: UTC+2 (SAST)
- Postal code (street): 2520
- PO box: 2520
- Area code: 018
- Website: http://www.potch.co.za

Potchefstroom (locally /ˈpɒtʃɛfstrʊərm/ POTCH-ef-stroorm; Afrikaans pronunciation: [ˌpɔtʃɛfˈstruəm]), known colloquially as Potch, is an academic city in the North West Province of South Africa. It hosts the Potchefstroom Campus of North-West University. Potchefstroom is situated on the Mooi River (Afrikaans for "pretty river"), approximately 120 km (75 mi) west-southwest of Johannesburg and 45 km (28 mi) east-northeast of Klerksdorp.

== Etymology ==
Several theories exist about the origin of the city's name. According to one theory, it originates from Potgieter + Chef + stroom. This refers to Voortrekker leader and town founder Andries Potgieter, with "chef" indicating the leader of the Voortrekkers and "stroom" referring to the Mooi River.

Geoffrey Jenkins writes, "Others however, attribute the name as having come from the word 'Potscherf', meaning a shard of a broken pot, due to the cracks that appear in the soil of the Mooi River Valley during drought resembling a broken pot". In a scholarly analysis, M. L. Fick suggests that Potchefstroom developed from the abbreviation of "Potgieterstroom" to "Potgerstroom", which then became "Potchefstroom". However, this does not account for the appearance of "Potjestroom" on many documents and photographs.

The African National Congress decided to change the name of the municipality and some street names in 2006, proposing "Tlokwe" as the new name. In 2007, the name change from Potchefstroom Municipality to Tlokwe City Council was officially approved and gazetted. However, the city itself continued to use the name Potchefstroom. In 2016, the Tlokwe Municipality merged with the Ventersdorp Municipality to form the larger JB Marks Local Municipality.

== History ==
Potchefstroom was officially proclaimed in December 1838 by the Voortrekkers, with physical settlement beginning around June 1839. It is generally accepted as the oldest town founded by Voortrekkers north of the Vaal River. The oldest European settlement is Klerksdorp, approximately 40 km (25 mi) to the west.

Until 1840, the towns of Potchefstroom and Winburg, along with their surrounding territories, formed a Boer Republic known as the Republic of Winburg-Potchefstroom. Voortrekker leader Andries Hendrik Potgieter was elected chief commandant. In October 1840, following a meeting between Potgieter, Andries Pretorius, and G. R. van Rooyen, it was decided that Potchefstroom would unite with "Pieter Mouriets Burg" (Pietermaritzburg).

On 17 January 1852, the Sand River Convention was signed by Commandant-General Andries Pretorius and a British delegation led by Major W. S. Hogge and C. M. Owen. Under the convention, the British government granted independence to the immigrant farmers north of the Vaal River, leading to the establishment of the Transvaal. Article 17 of the republic's 1858 constitution declared Potchefstroom as the capital and Pretoria as the seat of government. In May 1860, Potchefstroom became the "chief city" of the republic, while the capital moved to Pretoria.

The first Jewish residents arrived in Potchefstroom in 1878, and a Jewish cemetery was established in 1892, reflecting the growth of the community in the late 19th century.

On 16 December 1880, the First Boer War began when Boer forces laid siege to the old fort, occupied by British troops. The siege ended amicably on 23 March 1881. During the Second Boer War, the British implemented a scorched-earth policy, and according to the Anglo-Boer War Museum, some 30,000 Boer farmhouses were destroyed. As part of this campaign, the British established a concentration camp in Potchefstroom for Afrikaner civilians. According to historian G.N. van den Bergh, this was "the first and largest concentration camp in the Transvaal."

At the opening of the city hall in 1909, Colonial Secretary Jan Smuts was asked about the possibility of Potchefstroom becoming the capital of the Union of South Africa. He replied that the city stood no chance but should instead aim to be South Africa's largest educational centre. This led to Potchefstroom's reputation as the "city of expertise," with numerous tertiary educational institutions. Since 1997, it has hosted the annual late-September Aardklop Arts Festival, a predominantly Afrikaans arts festival.

== Population ==
The Potchefstroom Municipality, which includes several neighbouring settlements, had a population of 128,357 according to the 2007 community survey. Of these residents, 69.6 percent were White, 27.0 percent were Black, three percent were Coloureds, and 0.4 percent were Asian. The city proper and its surrounding suburbs have a population of 43,448, of which 69.9 percent are White, 25.4 percent are Black, 2.8 percent are Coloured, and 1.3 percent are Asian.

== Education ==
Potchefstroom is home to five tertiary institutions, 30 other schools, and a number of research and training centres, including:

- The North-West University, formally established on 1 January 2004 through the merger of three institutions: the Potchefstroom University for Christian Higher Education (founded 1869), the University of North-West (formerly the University of Bophuthatswana), and the Vaal Triangle Campus. The seat of the merged institution is in Potchefstroom. The Potchefstroom Campus is the largest, and the university's head office is located there. After the merger, the North-West University became one of South Africa's larger universities, with approximately 32,000 full-time and distance-education students.
- The Potchefstroom College of Education (originally the Normal College) was founded in 1919. Initially housed in galvanised-iron buildings on the same premises as the Potchefstroom High School for Boys, the college moved to its present location in 1923. It was incorporated by the university on 1 January 2001.
- The Technical College Potchefstroom, founded in 1939 when the Union Education Department began "continuation classes."
- The Agricultural Centre, previously known as the Experimental Farm (1902) and Agricultural College (1939), is the largest agricultural facility in one location in southern Africa. The centre houses the headquarters of the Highveld Region of the Department of Agriculture, the Agricultural Research Council's Grain Crops Institute (ARC-GCI), and the Agricultural College. The Potchefstroom Koekoek chicken breed was developed there.
- Potchefstroom Akademie, founded in 1981 by Tina Schöltz, offers tertiary education in somatology, health and skincare therapy, holistic health therapies, and interior design and decorating.
- Potchefstroom High School for Girls: Originally known as the Central School, it was established in 1874. Girls High was founded in 1905 when the Central School was divided into separate high schools for boys and girls.
- Potchefstroom High School for Boys, established in 1874, has been at its current site since 1905.
- HTS Potchefstroom, founded in January 1903.
- Potchefstroom Central Primary School, the city's only English-medium primary school.
- Hoër Volkskool Potchefstroom, founded in 1927.
- Laerskool President Pretorius, founded in 1897.
- Potchefstroom Gimnasium, founded in 1907.
- Public primary and high schools in Potchefstroom's townships include Boitirelo Primary School, Lesego Primary School, Boitshoko High School, Tlokwe High School and Hoerskool Ferdinand Postma.
- More schools in Potchefstroom can be found here

== Sports facilities ==
Potchefstroom, known as the North West Province's "Home of Sport," is the provincial headquarters for 17 major sports. The city council focuses on the establishment, maintenance, and upgrading of its sports facilities to meet the sporting and recreational needs of its youth. The Mooi River and various trails provide additional recreational opportunities for residents and tourists.

Potchefstroom has hosted two World Cup-winning teams (in cricket and football) and serves as a home away from home for many international athletes and teams. At an altitude of 1,400 metres (4,600 ft), it offers a good balance between elevation and quality training conditions. The city's good air quality, due to the absence of large factories, is also beneficial for training. Athletes and professional teams often train at the North-West University's High Performance Institute of Sport.

Potchefstroom resident and police officer Ken McArthur won the gold medal in the marathon at the 1912 Stockholm Olympics on 14 July 1912. In his home village of North Antrim, he was known for a distinctive training routine that included racing a narrow-gauge train.

The PUC McArthur Stadium, an athletics venue originally built in 1892 and named in his honour, was most recently renovated in 2014. Notable athletes associated with Potchefstroom include Godfrey Khotso Mokoena, the silver medallist in the long jump at the 2008 Beijing Summer Olympic Games, Hezekiél Sepeng, Jorrie Muller, Justine Robbeson, and Ryan Diedericks. British Olympic gold medallist Keely Hodgkinson owns a home in Potchefstroom and trains in the city on an annual basis.

Cricket is a popular sport, with Senwes Park serving as the home ground of the North-West Dragons. During the 2003 Cricket World Cup, Potchefstroom hosted matches between the national teams of Australia and the Netherlands, Australia and Namibia, and South Africa and Kenya. Potchefstroom also co-hosted the 2009 Cricket World Cup Qualifier. The South Africa national cricket team has regularly chosen Potchefstroom for off-season training and has hosted the Australian team's cricket camps. During the 2003 Cricket World Cup, the Australian cricket team chose Potchefstroom as their home base and went on to win the tournament.

Rugby is arguably Potchefstroom's most popular sport. Olën Park, the main rugby stadium, is primarily used for matches by the Leopards in the Vodacom Cup and the first division of the Currie Cup. The stadium is also used for football matches and has hosted the South Africa under-23 team. Jomo Cosmos also uses the stadium for some of its matches. Profert Olën Park was named after Carl Ludwig Theodor Olën, president of the Western Transvaal Rugby Union from 1922 to 1934. Profert, a local fertiliser company, maintains the playing field.

The Absa Puk Oval is located on the North-West University campus. The university's sports grounds are known as the Fanie du Toit Sports Complex. The main rugby field has hosted several Leopards games and the Potchefstroom Campus' Varsity Cup matches.

The visit of the Spain national football team during the 2010 FIFA World Cup brought a new level of sporting attention to Potchefstroom. Spain, who won their inaugural FIFA World Cup title, chose Potchefstroom as their base camp. A new sports complex was built at North-West University for the team.

== Government ==
Potchefstroom is the seat of the JB Marks Local Municipality in the Dr Kenneth Kaunda District Municipality.

== Attractions ==
=== Listed monuments ===
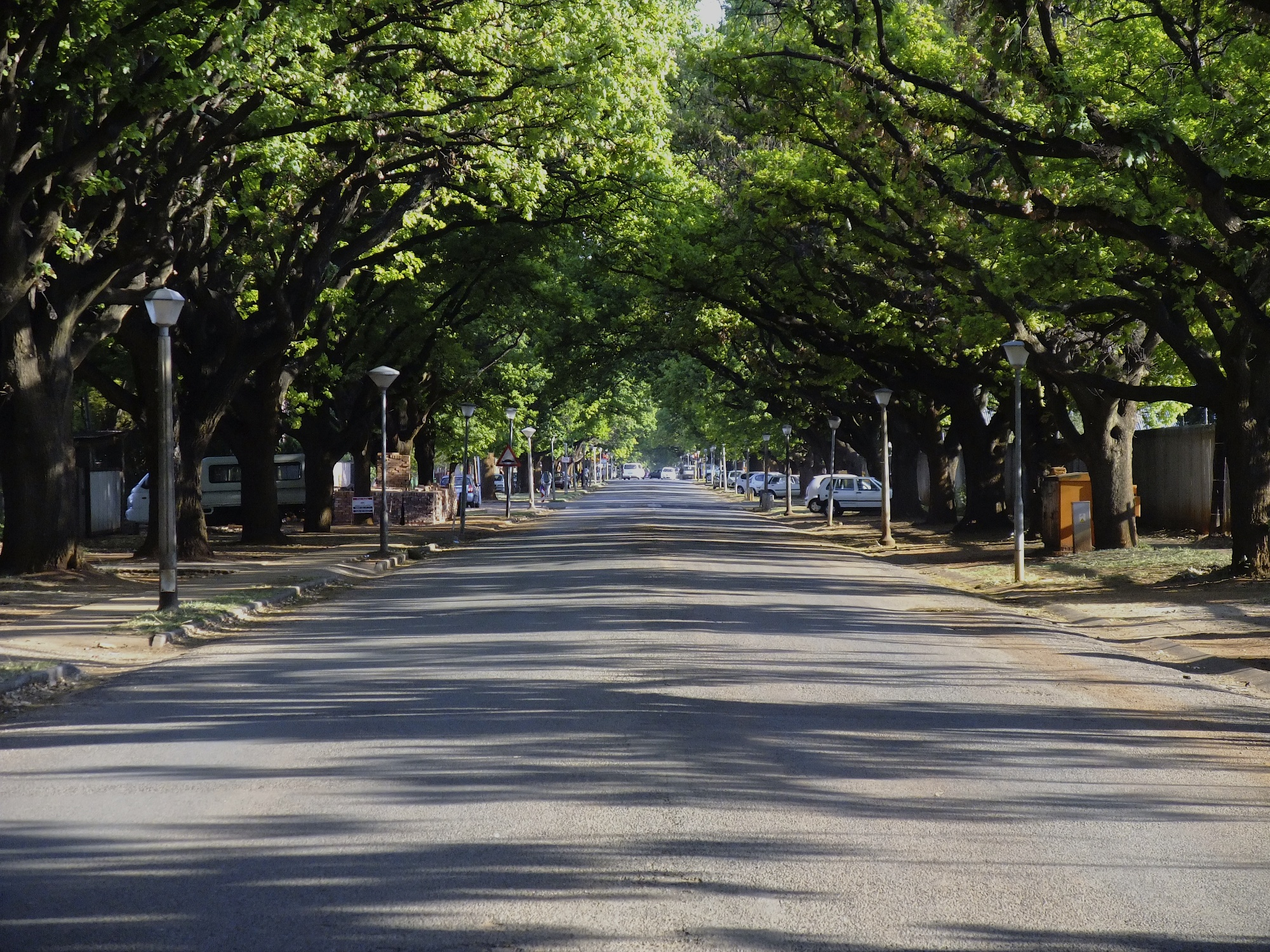
Oak Avenue, one of many oak-lined streets near the university

Since the Heritage Resources Act of 1999, monuments are classified as Grade I (national), Grade II (provincial), or Grade III (local). Many former national monuments have been reclassified as Grade II sites.

==== Grade I: National Heritage Sites ====
Old Fort and Cemetery, c. 1881
An earthwork quadrilateral located west of the Potchefstroom–Klerksdorp rail line and south of the main Potchefstroom–Klerksdorp road. British soldiers built the fort during the Anglo-Boer War in 1880 and were besieged by the Boers for 95 days. A number of soldiers and civilians who died during the siege are buried in the adjoining cemetery. It was declared a monument in 1937 (Item 27046 in the South African Heritage Resources Agency registry).
South African National Artillery Memorial
The national memorial site, located on Ventersdorp Road in Kanonierspark, for all artillery soldiers who died in combat during World War II.

==== Grade II: Provincial Heritage Sites ====
W. D. Pretorius House, c. 1853
Willem Daniel Pretorius, the great-grandnephew of President M. W. Pretorius, obtained this house and its outbuildings (on a farm adjacent to the town) in 1888. He immediately began extending and altering the house, inscribing his initials and the year (WDP 1888) on the new facade's front door. A small school, the forerunner of M. L. Fick Primary School, was housed in one of the buildings. The Mooi Rivier Dutch Reformed Church was founded there in 1917. The site, on the corner of Walter Sisulu Avenue and Smit Street, was declared a heritage site in 1987 (Item 27354 in SAHRA database).
Goetz-Fleishack House, c. 1857
This is the only surviving example of an early townhouse (dorpshuis) built around the Nieuwe Market Square, demonstrating the lifestyle of the first wealthy civilians of the South African Republic. The site was the residence of magistrate A. M. Goetz during the First War of Independence (1880–1881). His son-in-law, Albert Reinholdt Fleishack, later lived in the home. The house and outbuildings, at the intersection of Nelson Mandela and Sol Plaatjie Avenues, have been restored as a historic house museum. It was declared a national monument in 1985 (Item 27820 on the SAHRA register).
Nederduitsch Hervormde Kerk (Church), c. 1859
The original cruciform church, which had an earth floor and a thatched roof, later received a tin roof with decorative cast-iron horsemen and a spire. An 1892 renovation provided a plank floor, galleries, pews, a ceiling, and lamps. An organ gallery was later built, and a pipe organ was imported from London and transported by train and oxcart. The building's cornerstone was laid on 26 December 1859, and it was consecrated on 25 February 1866. Construction was interrupted in 1863–64 by the Transvaal Civil War. The church is on Walter Sisulu Avenue, opposite the Town Hall.
M. W. Pretorius House, c. 1868
The President Pretorius house is in the traditional Cape style, with white plaster and a thatched roof. It consists of a 1,323-hectare (5.11 sq mi) property with the original residence, a wagon house, stables, and a smithy. The site, with large oak trees planted by Pretorius, was declared a monument in 1979 (Item 27047 in the SAHRA register) and is now a house museum.
Berlin Missionary Complex, c. 1875
This building looked identical to the Berlin Mission Church in Pretoria: a small hall with "fortified" colonial Gothic elements. It initially had a thatched roof and a dirt floor. The roof was replaced with tin in 1956, and a parquet floor and gallery were added. Minor changes have been made since 1938, when the new Evangelical Lutheran congregation began using the Mission Church. The Gereformeerde Church Mooi Rivier now owns the building, at the corner of Sol Plaatjie and Du Plooy Streets.
St. Mary's Anglican Church, c. 1890
Credited to John William Gaisford, the first known architect in Potchefstroom, the church on Auto Street originally had a steeply-pitched thatched roof, a lancet window, and a dirt floor.
Dutch Reformed Mother Church Potchefstroom, c. 1895
The church, featuring Gothic elements, was designed by a master builder named Wocke. President Paul Kruger laid its foundation stone on 13 February 1894, and it served as a temporary hospital during the Anglo-Boer War. Beyers Naudé was a minister at the church before he became an anti-apartheid activist. It was nearly destroyed by a fire on 13 March 2007 but was restored by 2009; a new organ was dedicated in September 2011. The church is on the corner of Beyers Naude and Nelson Mandela Drives.
Old Powder Magazine, c. 1898
One of Potchefstroom's oldest existing buildings, its permit was granted in 1854, and the magazine was almost certainly in use by 1857. It played a prominent role in the 1881 siege of Potchefstroom, when the British demolished part of it to use the materials for cover. It was demolished in 1883, and the current magazine (half the size of the original) was built in its place by 1898. It was declared a monument in 1973 (Item 27357 in the SAHRA database).
Old Fourth Prison, c. 1898
The Fourth Prison was built on the current site before the outbreak of the Anglo-Boer War (1899–1903). It was used as a prison and was the headquarters of the Potchefstroom Commando until 1998. The building, on Auto Avenue, now houses the Tlokwe Youth Centre.
Old Post Office building (Landdrost Post en Telegraafgebou), c. 1897
The building, on Greyling Street, was declared a heritage site in 1991 (Items 27142 and 27144 in the SAHRA register).
Theological School Complex, c. 1905
The Theological School Complex, on Molen Street, is a symbol of the Reformed Church (Gereformeerde Kerk) training and Afrikaans instruction at the primary, secondary, and tertiary levels.
Totius House, c. 1905
The site, like the Theological School Building, came into use in 1905. It is a near-replica of a professor's residence in Burgersdorp, from where the Reformed Church seminary moved. The house's first resident was Jan Lion Cachet. He was succeeded in 1911 by Jacob Daniel Du Toit (Totius) as a professor at the Theological School. Totius and his family lived in the house until 1924, and he wrote at least four of his poetry volumes there. He also began his Afrikaans translation of the Bible, which he continued on a farm in Krugerskraal. The house, on Molen Street, is now a museum.
Town Hall, c. 1909
An Edwardian Classical building dedicated on 10 March 1909 by Colonial Secretary Jan Smuts. It and the Krugersdorp City Hall are the oldest existing city halls north of the Vaal River in South Africa. Its western façade is symmetrical, with a 26 m (85 ft)-high ornamental domed tower as the central axis. The clock and bell, which feature Westminster chimes, were manufactured in the Netherlands. The building cost £12,000 at the time. It was declared a heritage site in 1993 (Item 27143 in the SAHRA register).
Selbourne Hall, c. 1909
The building, on the Agricultural College campus, is in disrepair.
Oak Avenue, c. 1910
The Potchefstroom town council decided to plant an oak lane in 1910. The 6.84-kilometre (4.25 mi) lane stretches from the Agricultural Centre to the Lakeside Resort. The streets include Chris Hani Drive, Kock Street, Dr. Wolmarans Street, Beyers Naudé Avenue, Retief Street, and Peter Mokaba, Steve Biko, and Calderbank Avenues. The site was declared a monument in 1977 (Item 27304 in the SAHRA registry), and a stone beacon with a bronze plaque was erected at the corner of Lombard and Kruger Streets.
Commanding Officer's House / Witrand Hospital Superintendent's House, c. 1913
Formerly the residence of the commanding officer of the British garrison in Potchefstroom, it is also known as the General's House. Colonel S. H. C. Monro was the garrison's first commanding officer and the first resident of the house. It later served as the residence of the Witrand Care and Rehabilitation Centre superintendent. Declared a heritage site in 1982 (Item 27665 in the SAHRA database), it is on the Witrand grounds on Ventersdorp Road.
Carnegie Library, c. 1914
The building was named after Andrew Carnegie, who funded this library and others worldwide. Its portico and gable are derived from the adjacent town hall, giving the buildings a similar appearance. It serves as a liaison office for the town council and Potchefstroom Tourism. Located on the corner of Nelson Mandela and Walter Sisulu Avenues, it was declared a monument in 1993 (Item 27140 in the SAHRA database).
Heimat building, c. 1925
This two-storey hostel in the Neo-Cape Dutch style, designed by Gerard Moerdijk, was the first permanent building on the university campus. It was decided that it would be called Ons Huis (Our Home). When students occupied it, however, it was called the Klimop (Creeper). The students eventually named it Heimat, a name that remained after it was re-allocated for academic purposes in 1980. Declared a heritage site in 1984 (item 27194 in the SAHRA register), the building on the Potchefstroom campus of North-West University houses the university's Department of Culture.
The Roets House, c. 1926
The house was built by Jan van der Walt so his son, Peter, could remain at home while studying at the university. Hennie Roets, principal of the Mooi River Laerskool, later occupied the house. Located at 61 Steve Biko Avenue, it was declared a heritage site in 1984.
Main Building, University, c. 1930
The building was designed by architect Henri Louw of Bloemfontein, and its seven arches were meant to echo the seven candelabra in the university's logo. Dedicated on 13 April 1931, the two-storey building originally housed lecture halls, offices, and the library. Declared a monument in 1984, Building F5 now houses the Faculty of Law.
Rector's Residence, 1 Calderbank Avenue
This Tudor-style building was declared a heritage site in 1999 (Item 27680 in the SAHRA database).
72, 74 and 76 James Maroka Avenue
These three houses were declared heritage sites in 1991.

==== Provisional Grade III sites ====
Although Potchefstroom has no officially designated local heritage sites, the following sites have been placed on the municipality's provisional list:

- Snowflake Silo building, Wolmarans Street (c. 1921)
- Boyd House, corner of Walter Sisulu Avenue and Ayers Street (c. 1909)
- Piet Malan House, 57 Steve Biko Avenue (c. 1890)
- Kohinoor Cinema, Walter Sisulu Avenue (c. 1950): The cinema, in Makweteng (now Mieder Park), was built in the early 1950s and operated through the 1970s. It was also used for dancing competitions (particularly ballroom dancing) and weddings before the forced removals from 1958 to 1963. It hosted jazz concerts with performers like the Twist Rovers, Spokes Mashiane, and other groups from Johannesburg.
- Potchefstroom Dam and Lakeside Resort, Calderbank Avenue (c. 1908)
- Calderbank Building, Walter Sisulu Avenue (c. 1930)
- A. M. E. Church, Ikageng (c. 1961)
- House of the Editor-Bate, James Maroka Avenue (c. 1902)
- Triomf (Knock) Fertilizer (c. 1968)
- Potchefstroom Station building (c. 1919) and steam locomotive on its forecourt, from 1902
- Potchefstroom Synagogue, James Maroka Avenue (c. 1920): The building now houses the Potchefstroom Academy.
- Devil's Corner, Ikageng (c. 1960): An open space used by the Ikageng community. During the 1960s, it was used for fashion parades and is now a celebration venue for the Kaizer Chiefs Football Club. It was also used as a hiding place by local criminals and as a meeting place for local activists and organisations.
- Tlokwe Memorial Park, entrance to Ikageng (c. 2009): A memorial park under construction for local activists who died during the liberation struggle.
- Cachet Park, Die Bult (c. 1900): Used for the annual Aardklop National Arts Festival.

=== Other places of interest ===
- Boskop Dam Nature Reserve
- Boskop Wild Animal Park
- O. P. M. Prozesky Bird Sanctuary
- Dome Bergland Nature Park, the site of a meteorite impact which created the Vredefort Dome.
- The Trim Park, located in the Green Belt area adjacent to the Mooi River.
- The North-West University Botanical Garden, adjacent to the Potchefstroom campus, covers an area of almost 3 hectares (7.4 acres). Most of its plants are indigenous, with a few exotic plants of botanical or medicinal interest. A section around a man-made ridge is a natural field garden, while the rest is more intensively managed. A variety of mammals, birds, amphibians, and fish have made the garden their home in recent years.
- The town is home to the country's oldest Reformed Churches and its oldest stone-built Hervormde Church. St Mary's Anglican Church, built in 1891, is notable for its stained-glass windows. The N. G. Moedergemeente building, which burnt down in July 2007, has since been restored.
- The Witrand Mental Institute, the second government institution for psychiatric patients in South Africa, opened in 1923. The first was Valkenberg Hospital, which opened in Maitland in the Cape.
- Potchefstroom Museum
- Reformed Church Museum
- MooiRivier Mall, a shopping mall that opened in early 2008 with over 100 stores, as well as food and entertainment facilities overlooking the Mooi River. The mall serves as a shopping destination for surrounding towns such as Carletonville, Ventersdorp, Parys, and Fochville.
- A mosque, re-formed in 2007.

== Economy ==
Potchefstroom is an industrial, service, and agricultural growth point for the North West province. Its industries include steel, food, and chemical processing. The chicken industry is particularly important, with companies such as Chubby Chick, Serfontein Poultry, Haagner's Poultry, Crown Chicken, and Highveld Egg Cooperative operating in and around the city.

== Military ==
Potchefstroom is a major centre for the South African National Defence Force (SANDF), hosting significant training and operational units. The city is the location of Army Support Base (ASB) Potchefstroom, which serves as a key logistical and support hub for the SANDF in the region and houses the Defence Reserves Provincial Office for the North West. The base is home to several key units, including the 4 Artillery Regiment and the Artillery Mobile Regiment.

=== Training areas and facilities ===
The city's military infrastructure includes the General de la Rey Training Area. According to a 2024 study in the academic journal Scientia Militaria, this area covers 235 square kilometres, making it one of the five largest military training and live-firing ranges in South Africa. The base hosts major national events, such as the annual DOD Youth Celebration Week.

=== Historical significance ===
Potchefstroom has a long history as a military town. The School of Artillery, originally established in 1934, relocated to Potchefstroom in 1939 and was granted the Freedom of the City on 10 March 1978. The city was also home to the 3 South African Infantry Battalion from 1968 until its relocation in 1988; it was a major basic training unit and received the Freedom of the City on 27 May 1988.

The city formerly hosted Air Force Base Potchefstroom. As part of a "peace dividend" and budget rationalisation following the end of apartheid, the base was closed, as documented by the South African Air Force Museum and other historical military records. The base had been operationally significant, with units such as 103 Squadron being established at the airfield on 24 September 1963.

=== Military heritage and ceremonies ===
The city's strong military ties are reflected in its regular parades and ceremonies. Potchefstroom has hosted Armed Forces Day celebrations, national military skills competitions, and regular medal parades. Military units frequently hold Freedom of the City parades through the town. Potchefstroom is also the site of the National Gunners' Memorial, where annual memorial services are held to commemorate fallen artillery soldiers.

== Climate ==
Climate data for Potchefstroom, elevation 1,351 m (4,432 ft), (1991–2020 normals, extremes 1997–2023)
Month	Jan	Feb	Mar	Apr	May	Jun	Jul	Aug	Sep	Oct	Nov	Dec	Year
Record high °C (°F)	40.8 (105.4)	38.6 (101.5)	36.5 (97.7)	35.7 (96.3)	30.2 (86.4)	28.1 (82.6)	29.2 (84.6)	33.8 (92.8)	35.2 (95.4)	41.3 (106.3)	39.4 (102.9)	40.1 (104.2)	41.3 (106.3)
Mean daily maximum °C (°F)	31.8 (89.2)	31.0 (87.8)	30.0 (86.0)	27.2 (81.0)	24.4 (75.9)	21.8 (71.2)	21.7 (71.1)	25.1 (77.2)	28.9 (84.0)	31.0 (87.8)	31.7 (89.1)	31.8 (89.2)	28.0 (82.5)
Daily mean °C (°F)	24.3 (75.7)	23.4 (74.1)	22.4 (72.3)	18.5 (65.3)	14.7 (58.5)	11.4 (52.5)	11.0 (51.8)	14.4 (57.9)	18.4 (65.1)	21.5 (70.7)	23.0 (73.4)	23.9 (75.0)	18.9 (66.0)
Mean daily minimum °C (°F)	16.4 (61.5)	15.8 (60.4)	14.3 (57.7)	10.0 (50.0)	4.7 (40.5)	1.0 (33.8)	0.5 (32.9)	3.7 (38.7)	7.9 (46.2)	12.1 (53.8)	14.1 (57.4)	15.8 (60.4)	9.7 (49.4)
Record low °C (°F)	8.2 (46.8)	8.4 (47.1)	5.0 (41.0)	−1.8 (28.8)	−5.7 (21.7)	−9.3 (15.3)	−9.2 (15.4)	−7.7 (18.1)	−5.5 (22.1)	0.5 (32.9)	3.1 (37.6)	7.7 (45.9)	−9.3 (15.3)
Average precipitation mm (inches)	103.9 (4.09)	94.8 (3.73)	77.9 (3.07)	44.6 (1.76)	19.2 (0.76)	7.1 (0.28)	6.7 (0.26)	8.4 (0.33)	16.3 (0.64)	49.2 (1.94)	81.1 (3.19)	102.6 (4.04)	611.8 (24.09)
Average precipitation days (≥ 0.25 mm)	11.2	9.8	9.5	5.7	3.1	1.2	1.1	1.2	2.3	6.5	9.7	11.1	72.4
Source: Starlings Roost Weather (precipitation 1903–2023)

== Sources ==
- Jenkins, Geoffrey (1971). The Story of Potchefstroom (2nd ed.). Cape Town: A. A. Balkema.
