= Vaal Reefs mining disaster =

1995 South Africa mine elevator accident

Vaal Reefs Mining Disaster
- Date: 10 May 1995
- Location: Orkney, South Africa; 26°56′07″S 26°45′54″E
- Cause: Runaway mine locomotive
- Deaths: 104 (Note: Some sources give the number of deaths as 105)

The Vaal Reefs mine disaster occurred on 10 May 1995 when an underground locomotive in the Vaal Reefs gold mine in South Africa fell into the mine shaft, hitting an elevator carrying mine workers, and causing it to plunge to the bottom of the shaft, killing 104 miners. It is the worst elevator accident in history.

== Disaster ==
The disaster occurred at 8:30 pm when a 12-ton underground locomotive operating at level 56 of the mine, 1,676 metres (5,500 ft) below the surface, entered the wrong tunnel and went out of control. The locomotive and carriage crashed through a safety barrier intended for much smaller equipment, and fell into the Number 2 mine shaft. At the time, a double-storey elevator cage was ascending the shaft from level 62 1,859 m (6,100 ft) below the surface, packed to its full capacity of over 100 miners who had completed their shift. The locomotive fell onto the elevator further down the shaft, causing the elevator to plunge 460 m (1,510 ft) to the bottom of the shaft, where it was further crushed to one third of its original size when the locomotive landed on it. All miners on board the elevator were killed. The driver of the locomotive survived after jumping clear of the locomotive before it fell.

== Response ==
Officials realised immediately after the accident that it was extremely unlikely that anyone in the elevator could have survived. About 400 other miners still underground were evacuated via the Number 5 shaft. Rescuers made their way down another shaft and through miles of lateral tunnels, reached the crushed elevator at the bottom of the Number 2 shaft, and found a devastating scene of crushed and mutilated bodies. By the following night only 6 bodies had been recovered, mainly those who had been flung clear of the elevator, while recovery teams considered how to access the bodies by cutting their way into the wreckage using blowtorches. Bodies were recovered, often in parts, and brought to the surface on stretchers wrapped in blankets.

The Minister of Mineral and Energy Affairs, Pik Botha, visited the scene and described it as "the most gruesome sight I have ever seen." James Motlatsi, the president of the National Union of Mine Workers (NUM) said "Pieces of flesh were scattered all over... as a two-floor mining carriage (elevator) was crushed into a one-floor tin box." Kgalema Motlanthe, general secretary of the NUM and later President of South Africa, also visited the scene soon after the accident. The extreme heat in the depths of the mine caused the bodies to start to decompose in the course of the recovery, further complicating the recovery and the difficult task of identifying the mutilated remains. By Friday, two days after the accident, the top deck of the elevator had been cleared with 56 bodies recovered, and the recovery of remains from the lower deck had begun. Individual rescuers spent as long as 61 hours underground recovering bodies, receiving trauma counselling as well as HIV testing and Hepatitis B testing in the aftermath.

President Nelson Mandela declared a national day of mourning, and 45 of the victims were buried in a mass funeral a month later.

== Investigation ==
The accident investigation was one of the first since South Africa's first democratic election in 1994, and unlike earlier accidents, mineworkers were represented from the start via the National Union of Mineworkers (NUM). The investigation was headed by a judge and received extensive testimony.

The investigation blamed the accident on several failures of safety systems that should have prevented the locomotive from running away and from falling into the shaft. It found that the locomotive was parked in a prohibited area and that an electrical circuit had been bridged out, bypassing the safety mechanism. The report found that the mine had not implemented urgent safety measures recommended after a similar but non-fatal incident three years before. It also found that the elevator fell after its detaching hook opened due to the impact of the locomotive. Had the hook not opened, the cables had enough elasticity to absorb the impact of the locomotive without breaking, and many of those in the elevator may have survived.

The report recommended that the Vaal Reefs Exploration and Mining Company (a subsidiary of Anglo American), should be prosecuted for culpable homicide.

== Consequences ==
The disaster came shortly before the conclusion of the Leon Commission, a major judicial inquiry into health and safety at South Africa's mines. The Vaal Reefs disaster and the publication of the Leon Commission report brought major changes to the mining industry, including the implementation of a new Mine Health and Safety Act. In addition, the mine shareholders provided compensation to dead workers' dependents. In this case, 431 dependents became beneficiaries of the Vaal Reefs Disaster Trust. They lived or live across South Africa (114), Lesotho (219), Mozambique (54), Botswana (31) and Eswatini (13).

== Related incidents ==
The Number 2 shaft at Vaal Reefs had experienced an elevator fall resulting in 31 fatalities on 27 March 1980, when a descending elevator became stuck in the shaft. The elevator cable continued to pay out despite the stuck elevator. The elevator then abruptly became unstuck and fell to the end of the slack cable, ripped away from the cable, and continued falling to the bottom of the shaft.

Another South African gold mine was the scene of an earlier deadly elevator accident in 1987. A methane gas explosion at the St. Helena gold mine in Welkom severed the cable of a double-deck elevator, causing it to fall 1.4 km (0.9 mi) to the bottom of the mine shaft, killing all 52 people on board. 10 others who were not in the elevator were killed in the explosion. The two Vaal Reefs mine disasters and the St Helena mine disaster remain the three worst elevator accidents in history.
