= 2006 Minato Ward elevator accident =

Fatal elevator accident in 2006 in Tokyo

The 2006 Minato Ward elevator accident was an incident in June 2006 which shook Japanese public confidence in the safety of elevators around the country. In June 2006, in Minato, Tokyo, a 16-year-old high school student was killed by an elevator maintained by SEC Elevator Co Ltd ("SEC") but originally manufactured and maintained by another elevator manufacturer and maintenance company. He was backing out of it with his bicycle when the elevator suddenly rose with the doors still open, causing asphyxiation. Investigations began relating to this fatality.

In the process of this investigation, elevator safety in Japan came under question, with media attention focused on Schindler Group, a Swiss elevator and escalator manufacturer which at the time operating in Japan as Schindler Elevator K.K. (シンドラーエレベータ株式会社, Shindorā Erebēta Kabushiki Kaisha). Of the 8,800 Schindler elevators installed in Japan, 85 have trapped people.

Following the incident, the Minato Ward Public Housing Corporation ("MWPHC") replaced all five Schindler elevators at the City Heights Takeshiba complex ("Takeshiba Complex") in the condominium with models manufactured by Mitsubishi.

== Responsibility ==
Elevator maintenance had been carried out by Japan Electric Power Service Inc. ("JEPS") from April 2005, and by SEC from April 2006 until the time of the accident, not by the manufacturer. The International Herald Tribune and Asahi Shimbun reported on June 14 that "Loose bolts and worn brake pads, evidence of poor maintenance, likely played a central role in the elevator accident". In the article it can also be read that "it is the responsibility of the maintenance company to ensure that such bolts are tightly fastened".

Schindler pointed out that the maintenance of the elevator was carried out by a non-affiliated maintenance company and that the company does not have an indication of a product design mistake so far. However, Tokyo Metropolitan Police concluded that both Schindler and maintenance company were responsible for the accident. Five people had been reported to have been prosecuted. Schindler, Minato Ward Public Housing Corporation, and SEC, were publicly criticized for having displayed an evasive attitude toward the Japanese police and the condominiums' residents. They did not respond to or attend any public meetings for the first eight days, although they claimed to have fully cooperated with the investigation.

== Progress of accident investigation ==
- June 14, 2006. The International Herald Tribune (Herald Asahi) reports that "Loose bolts and worn brake pads, evidence of poor maintenance, likely played a central role in the elevator accident." ... "It is the responsibility of the maintenance company to ensure that such bolts are tightly fastened."
- June 14, 2006. Investigations reveal 6 cases in Japan where the elevator moved with the doors still open. Manufactured between 1997 and 1998, they used the same circuit board model which is now being investigated by Schindler. In the Chiba case, Schindler is still maintaining the elevator in question. Questions about the origins of the defect and why it took 7 years for some of them to fail have been raised, but Schindler Elevator KK's head Ken Smith claims that it might be PCB that has deteriorated. The elevator has had additional anti-upward safety devices installed.
- June 15, 2006. According to the Mainichi Newspaper, an employee of SEC testified to the police that he did not know how to adjust the brake of the "fatal" elevator and that he just left it as it was.
- June 16, 2006. Schindler has admitted that a software problem caused the problem with several elevators in Japan. Elevators manufactured between 1991 and 1993 are affected, although Schindler claims that this faulty code was not a material safety risk. The problem is elevator doors could open 0.5 seconds after the elevator starts moving. When the door opens, the elevator keeps moving and does not halt. Schindler would have upgraded the software code for the affected elevators by the end of June 17. However, this was not a factor in the Minato Ward accident which was still under investigation. On NHK 9 O'Clock News Schindler K.K. representative said that the programming error was detected and fixed for a number of elevators of the same model some time ago. However some service workers may have unwittingly gone and reprogrammed them again with the old codes during maintenance and this led to the malfunctions. Initially, 9 elevators were identified to have the problem, but the list later expanded to 52.
- June 17, 2006. NHK reports that a problem in the brake has been found in the Minato elevator as replacing the brake yielded no operational problems. The motor was confirmed to be off when the elevator killed Hirosuke Ichikawa. Experts have said (as quoted in the Yomiuri source at the end of this paragraph) if the motor was on, the boy would have received much more than bruising. Police are still investigating what caused the brake failure.
- June 18, 2006. NHK has reported that SEC, the independent company in charge of maintaining the Schindler elevator at Minato Ward, had passed an inspection of the elevator in question just 9 days before the accident. SEC had said that all components including the brakes were working properly.
- June 22, 2006. Minato Ward had confirmed that it will be replacing 2 of the Schindler Elevators (1 which killed 16 year old Ichikawa Hirosuke) to Mitsubishi elevators. The cost of replacement will be 168,000,000 yen (approx. US$1.46 Million).
- June 22, 2006. Kyodo News reports: "Police suspect a Japanese maintenance company for Schindler elevators in a Tokyo apartment building had failed to follow checkup manuals before a fatal accident on June 3 in one of the units, investigation sources said Thursday." (...) "The police suspect some of the checks by SEC Elevator Co. on the elevator's brake system were insufficient against the checkup manuals provided by the maintenance company and a public housing corporation affiliated with the Minato Ward office, the sources said. The police believe a brake malfunction was one of causes of the accident which killed 16-year-old Hirosuke Ichikawa at the building in Minato Ward."
- July 5, 2006. More Schindler door problems come to light: According to the Japan Elevator Association, the incidence of accidents in which passengers are trapped inside elevators made by the five major elevator manufacturers is on average 0.15 percent per month. However, in the case of those made by Schindler, the figure ranges from 0.4 percent to slightly less than 0.5 percent—about three times higher than average. Unfortunately the Japan Elevator Association data did not distinguish custom built elevators from commodity elevators. Custom built elevators have tend to have a higher defect rate. Elevator maintenance companies like Schindler, with a higher proportion of custom elevators, will have higher entrapment rates.
- August 14, 2006. On NHK's News Watch 9, it was revealed that the elevator which killed Ichikawa Hirosuke had anomalies in its brakes that did not relate to worn out pads. When tests were conducted, it showed that the disc brake was using 20% less current than other brakes of the same model.
- November 20, 2006. The 'deadly' Schindler elevator that killed Ichikawa has been replaced with a new Mitsubishi Elevator (according to). The mayor of Minato Ward has test-ridden the elevator and residents are reporting a much smoother ride. For the past few months, workers have been working around the clock, replacing the elevator in record time. The other elevator will be replaced by February.

== Litigation: Criminal and civil lawsuits ==
The accident resulted in three legal proceedings: one criminal suit and two civil suits.

=== Criminal Case ===
- March 30, 2009. After almost three years of investigation, the police records of the accused persons (four (President, Senior Managing Director, ex-Maintenance Director and the junior maintenance personnel in charge of the accident site) from SEC and two (ex-Maintenance Director and Maintenance Manager) from SEKK, but none from JEPS) were sent to the Tokyo District Prosecutor's Office for its determination as to whether the accused will be criminally indicted.
- July 16, 2009. Prosecutor's Office criminally indicted five out of six persons whose records were sent to the prosecutor's office in March 2009 (SEC's junior maintenance personnel in charge of the accident site was not indicted) on the charge of criminal manslaughter resulting from professional negligence.
- March 11, 2013. More than 3.5 years after the indictment and after the pre-trial procedure where the defense and the prosecution narrowed down the issues to be tried in court, the criminal trial commenced at the Tokyo District Court.
- September 29, 2015. After nearly sixty court hearing sessions, the Tokyo District Court issued its judgment as follows: as to SEKK defendant (one of the two original SEKK defendants died of illness during the trial), not guilty, since there were no indications of brake abnormalities present during SEKK's maintenance and inspection of the accident elevator (no foreseeability), so that the duty of care to take corrective actions did not arise as to the SEKK defendant; and as to SEC defendants, all three defendants were found guilty as charged, since the court deemed that SEC's existing maintenance regime to be inadequate based on a series of serious accidents at SEC-maintained sites shortly prior to the subject accident, so that it was "foreseeable" to SEC that serious personal injury or death could arise, and that it had a duty to construct an appropriate maintenance regime, which SEC failed to perform. SEC defendants immediately appealed the District Court's judgment to the Tokyo High Court, while the Prosecutor's Office appealed on October 9 the acquittal judgment in favor of the SEKK defendant.
- January 26, 2018. The Tokyo High Court affirmed the Tokyo District Court's September 2015 acquittal judgment as to the SEKK defendant, and the prosecution did not appeal the high court's judgment. Thus, the SEKK defendant's full acquittal became final.
- March 14, 2018. The Tokyo High Court reversed the Tokyo District Court's guilty judgment against SEC's three defendants, stating that the lower court erred in its finding of fact that the abnormal abrasion of brake lining, which was deemed a root cause of the accident had not yet taken place at the time of SEC's last inspection prior to the accident, and that accordingly, the SEC defendants could not foresee the accident. The prosecution also did not appeal the high court's judgment as to SEC's defendants, so both SEKK's and SEC's defendants' acquittals became final.

=== Civil suit involving the deceased's bereaved family ===
- December 12, 2008. The bereaved family filed a civil suit for damages in the amount of JPY 250 million for the wrongful death of the deceased with the Tokyo District Court against the elevator manufacturer (SEKK), the maintenance companies (JEPS and SEC) and the owner (Minato Ward) and the operator (MWPHC) respectively, of the Takeshiba Complex, where the fatal accident occurred.
- November 24, 2017. More than eleven years after the June 2006 accident and after heavy negotiation among the parties, the parties reached a court brokered settlement for an undisclosed sum, and each of the defendants pledging to take various measures to prevent the re-occurrence of similar accidents, after the court issued a strongly worded recommendation for the parties to settle.

=== Civil suit by Minato Ward and Minato Ward Public Housing Corporation ===
- July 6, 2010. Minato Ward and MWPHC jointly filed a civil suit for damages in the amount of JPY 1,384,192,575 with the Tokyo District Court against SEKK, Schindler Holding AG (SEKK's Swiss parent), SEC and JEPS for the losses allegedly incurred by the plaintiffs in the aftermath of the June 3, 2006 fatal accident at the Takeshiba Complex.
- December 6, 2019. More than nine years after filing the suit, Minato Ward City Council passed a bill which approved Minato Ward to settle with the defendants for an undisclosed sum. As was the case in the bereaved family case above, each of the defendants pledged to take various preventive measures, after the court issued a recommendation for the parties to settle.

== Repercussions of the Takeshiba accident ==
One of the tangible by-products of the Takeshiba accident and the public debate on elevator and escalator safety it engendered was the passing of an amendment to the Enforcement Order to the Building Standards Act (see Article 129-10 of the Enforcement Order) ("Order"), which went into effect on September 28, 2009. The Order obligates the building owners to install government approved UCMP (unintended car movement protection) safety devices (which will automatically stop elevator cars if they move while the doors remain open) to all newly installed elevators. The provisions of the Order will be mandatory only as to new elevator installations, but not to existing elevators, although installation of UCMP devices to all elevators are strongly encouraged.

As of October 2019, ten years after the Order above was put into effect, however, only about 20% of the approximately 700,000 elevators regularly inspected in Japan in privately owned buildings, and about 24% of the elevators installed in national government buildings were equipped with UCMP devices, representing a negligible increase from the previous year. The relatively slow adoption of UCMP devices appears to be primarily because of to the high cost of installing such devices. To promote the installation of UCMP devices, some municipalities and local governments, including Minato Ward where the 2006 fatal elevator accident occurred, are offering subsidies to building owners of qualified multi-unit dwellings to install UCMP devices.

== Wider concern ==
Public concern over the Minato Ward case has not been limited merely to Schindler elevators. The Asia Times Online reported that in response to a flood of inquiries from customers, including building owners, the third-largest domestic elevator company, Toshiba Elevator and Building Systems Corp., was offering free inspections of their elevators, while Mitsubishi Electric Corp., the leading firm, and Hitachi Ltd, which is the second-largest, were responding to requests on a case-by-case basis. A recent Japanese survey showed that 65% of the students interviewed are uncomfortable with elevators following the Minato incident.

In Hong Kong, following the Minato incident, many news agencies drew similarities between the Minato case and the 2002 Fanling Hong Kong case. As a result, Hong Kong's Public Housing Authority was questioned about the 33 public estates with Schindler elevators. The Housing Authority stated that all of its elevators are maintained by the original manufacturer (in Hong Kong's case, by "Jardine Schindler", a subsidiary of Jardine Matheson) and all elevators are inspected fully once every week. In comparison, Hong Kong law requires a full annual examination, load testing every 5 years, and an inspection every month. Some buildings have inspections every 2 weeks.

On July 20, 2006, it was reported by Asahi, one of Japan's largest newspapers, that an increasing number of software problems have been spotted, leading to 113 elevators requiring a software replacement.

Schindler later sold nearly all of its Japanese assets to Otis in 2016. Schindler Elevator K.K., however, still exists.

== See also ==
- List of elevator accidents
