= Vaal Reefs =

- Location within North West (South African province) Location within South Africa
- Coordinates: 26.929°S 26.736°E
- Country: South Africa
- Province: North West
- District: Dr Kenneth Kaunda
- Municipality: City of Matlosana

Area
  - Total: 6.15 km^{2} (2.37 sq mi)

Population (2001)
  - Total: 11,345
  - Density: 1,840/km^{2} (4,780/sq mi)

Racial makeup (2001)
  - Black African: 94.8%
  - Coloured: 0.2%
  - White: 5.0%

First languages (2001)
  - Xhosa: 34.7%
  - Sotho: 26.1%
  - Tswana: 14.3%
  - Tsonga: 6.0%
  - Other: 18.9%
- Time zone: UTC+2 (SAST)

Vaal Reefs is a gold-bearing reef which is mined near the town of Orkney in Dr Kenneth Kaunda District Municipality in the North West province of South Africa.

The town of Orkney is home to a large gold mining operation originally owned by AngloGold Ashanti, a company that was originally incorporated in 1944 under the name of Vaal Reefs Exploration and Mining Company Limited.

== Disaster ==
A mining accident on 10 May 1995 killed 104 miners. A locomotive fell into an elevator shaft at the edge of 56 level, 1,676 metres (5,499 ft) below the surface, landing on the cage and causing it to plunge 460 metres (1,510 ft) to the bottom. It is the deadliest ever elevator disaster.

This tragedy brought two key changes to the mining industry: The immediate implementation of a new Health & Safety Act and shareholders providing compensation to dead workers' dependents. In this case, 431 dependents became beneficiaries of the Vaal Reefs Disaster Trust. They lived or live across South Africa (114), Lesotho (219), Mozambique (54), Botswana (31) and Eswatini (13).
