= Ventersdorp Local Municipality =

Coordinates: 26°20′S 26°55′E

Ventersdorp
- Local municipality
- Seal

- Location in the North West
- Country: South Africa
- Province: North West
- District: Dr Kenneth Kaunda
- Seat: Ventersdorp
- Wards: 6

Government
  - Type: Municipal council
  - Mayor: Nontetho Cilia Phoyane

Area
  - Total: 3,764 km^{2} (1,453 sq mi)

Population (2011)
  - Total: 56,702
  - Density: 15.06/km^{2} (39.02/sq mi)

Racial makeup (2011)
  - Black African: 90.1%
  - Coloured: 2.7%
  - Indian/Asian: 0.3%
  - White: 5.9%

First languages (2011)
  - Tswana: 75.0%
  - Afrikaans: 8.9%
  - Xhosa: 7.3%
  - English: 2.4%
  - Other: 6.4%
- Time zone: UTC+2 (SAST)
- Municipal code: NW401

Ventersdorp Local Municipality was a local municipality in Dr Kenneth Kaunda District Municipality, North West Province, South Africa. The seat of local municipality was Ventersdorp. After the municipal elections on 3 August 2016 it was merged into the larger JB Marks Local Municipality.

== Main places ==
The 2001 census divided the municipality into the following main places:

Place	Code	Area (km^{2})	Population	Most spoken language
Schoonspruit Nature Reserve	61701	38.41	0	-
Tshing	61702	2.17	13,533	Tswana
Ventersdorp	61704	7.25	3,212	Afrikaans
Remainder of the municipality	61703	3,716.51	26,329	Tswana

== Politics ==
The municipal council consisted of twelve members elected by mixed-member proportional representation. Six councillors were elected by first-past-the-post voting in six wards, while the remaining six were chosen from party lists so that the total number of party representatives was proportional to the number of votes received. In the election of 18 May 2011 the African National Congress (ANC) won a majority of ten seats on the council.

The following table shows the results of the election.

Party	Votes				Seats		
Party	Ward	List	Total	%	Ward	List	Total
ANC	8,612	8,791	17,403	80.9	6	4	10
DA	1,577	1,470	3,047	14.2	0	2	2
COPE	410	331	741	3.4	0	0	0
VF+	155	168	323	1.5	0	0	0
Total	10,754	10,760	21,514	100.0	6	6	12
Spoilt votes	203	192	395				
