= JB Marks Local Municipality =

- Local municipality
- Map of the North West with JB Marks highlighted
- Country: South Africa
- Province: North West
- District: Dr Kenneth Kaunda
- Seat: Potchefstroom

Government
  - Type: Municipal council
  - Executive Mayor: Gaba Thithiba Ka Qhele (ANC)

Area
  - Total: 6,398 km^{2} (2,470 sq mi)

Population (2022)
  - Total: 212,670
  - Density: 33.24/km^{2} (86.09/sq mi)

Racial makeup (2022)
  - Black African: 83.8%
  - Coloured: 5.1%
  - Indian/Asian: 0.1%
  - White South African: 10.7%
- Time zone: UTC+2 (SAST)
- Municipal code: NW405

JB Marks Municipality (Tswana: Mmasepala wa JB Marks; Afrikaans: JB Marks Munisipaliteit) is a local municipality within the Dr Kenneth Kaunda District Municipality, in the North West province of South Africa. It was established after the August 2016 local elections by merging the Tlokwe and Ventersdorp municipalities.

The municipality was renamed after JB Marks in 2017, following the creation of the new municipality the year before. Other name proposals included Josie Mpama. Marks was born in Ventersdorp while Mpama was born in Potchefstroom.

== Politics ==
The municipal council consists of seventy-seven members elected by mixed-member proportional representation. Thirty-four councillors are elected by first-past-the-post voting in thirty-four wards, while the remaining thirty-three are chosen from party lists so that the total number of party representatives is proportional to the number of votes received.

In the election of 4 November 2026, no party won a majority. The African National Congress (ANC) won the largest number of seats in council, twenty-two.

The following table shows the results of the election.

Party	Ward			List			Total seats
Party	Votes	%	Seats	Votes	%	Seats	Total seats
African National Congress	23,121	33.43	22	22,822	32.87	0	22
Democratic Alliance	22,072	31.92	12	21,970	31.65	9	21
Freedom Front Plus	6,365	9.20	0	6,514	9.38	6	6
ActionSA	5,375	7.77	0	5,544	7.99	5	5
Economic Freedom Fighters	5,059	7.32	0	5,014	7.22	5	5
Baagi	3,095	4.48	0	3,218	4.64	3	3
Patriotic Alliance	825	1.19	0	834	1.20	1	1
uMkhonto weSizwe Party	751	1.09	0	869	1.25	1	1
South African Communist Party	716	1.04	0	622	0.90	1	1
Concerned Potchefstroom Residents	444	0.64	0	450	0.65	1	1
African Christian Democratic Party	413	0.60	0	442	0.64	1	1
9 other parties	920	1.33	0	1,124	1.62	0	0
Total	69,156	100.00	34	69,423	100.00	33	67
Valid votes	69,156	98.28		69,423	98.43		
Invalid/blank votes	1,213	1.72		1,108	1.57		
Total votes	70,369	100.00		70,531	100.00		
Registered voters/turnout	131,963	53.32		131,963	53.45		

== Languages ==
The 2011 census indicated the following prevalence of languages for the combined municipalities of Tlokwe and Ventersdorp:

- 67.1% Setswana;
- 17.4% Afrikaans;
- 4.2% English;
- 1.4% IsiZulu;
- 1.3% Sesotho;
- 1.0% IsiXhosa;
- 0.8% IsiNdebele
