= Dr Kenneth Kaunda District Municipality =

Coordinates: 26°50′S 26°35′E

Dr Kenneth Kaunda
- District municipality
- Seal

- Location in South Africa
- Country: South Africa
- Province: North West
- Seat: Klerksdorp
- Local municipalities: List: JB Marks; City of Matlosana; Maquassi Hills

Government
  - Type: Municipal council
  - Mayor: Nikiwe Num

Area
  - Total: 14,642 km^{2} (5,653 sq mi)

Population (2011)
  - Total: 695,933
  - Density: 47.530/km^{2} (123.10/sq mi)

Racial makeup (2011)
  - Black African: 80.3%
  - Coloured: 4.1%
  - Indian/Asian: 0.7%
  - White: 14.5%

First languages (2011)
  - Tswana: 44.8%
  - Afrikaans: 18.4%
  - Sotho: 15.3%
  - Xhosa: 11.5%
  - Other: 10%
- Time zone: UTC+2 (SAST)
- Municipal code: DC40

The Dr Kenneth Kaunda District Municipality (Tswana: Mmasepala wa Sedika wa Dr Kenneth Kaunda; Afrikaans: Dr Kenneth Kaunda-distriksmunisipaliteit; Sotho: Masepala wa Setereke wa Dr Kenneth Kaunda; Xhosa: uMasipala weSithili sase Dr Kenneth Kaunda), formerly the Southern District Municipality, is one of the 4 districts of the North West province of South Africa. The seat of the municipality is Klerksdorp. As of 2016, a plurality of its 742,821 residents speak Setswana. The majority of its residents live in the City of Matlosana. The district code is DC40. The district is named after Kenneth Kaunda, the first President of Zambia.

== Geography ==
=== Neighbours ===
The District borders both Gauteng and Free State Provinces. Dr Kenneth Kaunda District is surrounded (clockwise) by:

- Bojanala Platinum District Municipality to the north
- West Rand District Municipality (Gauteng province) to the east
- Sedibeng District Municipality (Gauteng province) to the east
- Fezile Dabi District Municipality (Free State province) to the south-east
- Lejweleputswa District Municipality (Free State province) to the south
- Dr Ruth Segomotsi Mompati District Municipality to the south-west
- Ngaka Modiri Molema District Municipality to the north-west

=== Local municipalities ===
The district contains the following local municipalities:

Name	Code	Seat	Area (km^{2})	Population (2016)	Pop. density (per km^{2})
City of Matlosana Local Municipality	NW403	Klerksdorp	3,602	417,282	115.8
JB Marks Local Municipality	NW405	Potchefstroom	6,398	243,527	38.1
Maquassi Hills Local Municipality	NW404	Wolmaransstad	4,671	82,012	17.6

After the 2016 Local Government elections, Tlokwe and Ventersdorp Local Municipalities were merged into the JB Marks Local Municipality.

== Demographics ==
The following statistics are from the 2011 census.

Language	Population	%
Setswana	306 897	44.8%
Afrikaans	126 285	18.43%
Sesotho	104 797	15.30%
IsiXhosa	78 472	11.45%
English	27 141	3.96%
IsiZulu	13 459	1.96%
Other	6 765	0.99%
Xitsonga	5 944	0.87%
IsiNdebele	5 314	0.78%
Sepedi	3 972	0.58%
Sign language	3 396	0.50%
SiSwati	1 627	0.24%
Tshivenda	1 015	0.15%

=== Gender ===
Genders	Population	%
Female	348 676	50.10%
Male	347 258	49.90%

=== Ethnic group ===
Ethnic group	Population	%
Black African	559 011	80.33%
White	101 034	14.52%
Coloured	28 322	4.07%
Indian/Asian	5 105	0.73%
Other	2 461	0.35%

=== Age ===
Age	Population	%
000 - 004	52 714	8.79%
005 - 009	51 847	8.65%
010 - 014	57 243	9.55%
015 - 019	61 062	10.18%
020 - 024	57 261	9.55%
025 - 029	54 606	9.11%
030 - 034	51 489	8.59%
035 - 039	50 094	8.35%
040 - 044	43 850	7.31%
045 - 049	33 471	5.58%
050 - 054	24 755	4.13%
055 - 059	18 666	3.11%
060 - 064	14 690	2.45%
065 - 069	10 532	1.76%
070 - 074	7 770	1.30%
075 - 079	4 823	0.80%
080 - 084	3 003	0.50%
085 - 089	1 166	0.19%
090 - 094	420	0.07%
095 - 099	150	0.03%
100 plus	62	0.01%

== Politics ==
=== Election results ===
Election results for Kaunda District in the South African general election, 2004:

- Population 18 and over: 401 692 [66.99% of total population]
- Total votes: 226 396 [37.75% of total population]
- Voting % estimate: 56.36% votes as a % of population 18 and over

Party	Votes	%
African National Congress	174 328	77.00%
Democratic Alliance	28 838	12.74%
Freedom Front Plus	6 465	2.86%
African Christian Democratic Party	3 503	1.55%
Independent Democrats	2 877	1.27%
Pan African Congress	2 338	1.03%
United Democratic Movement	2 095	0.93%
New National Party	1 858	0.82%
United Christian Democratic Party	1 670	0.74%
Inkhata Freedom Party	851	0.38%
Azanian People's Organisation	410	0.18%
NA	247	0.11%
SOPA	171	0.08%
CDP	159	0.07%
EMSA	141	0.06%
UF	116	0.05%
PJC	105	0.05%
TOP	82	0.04%
KISS	54	0.02%
NLP	54	0.02%
Minority Front	34	0.02%
Total	226 396	100.00%
