= Sand forest =

Type of subtropical forest region

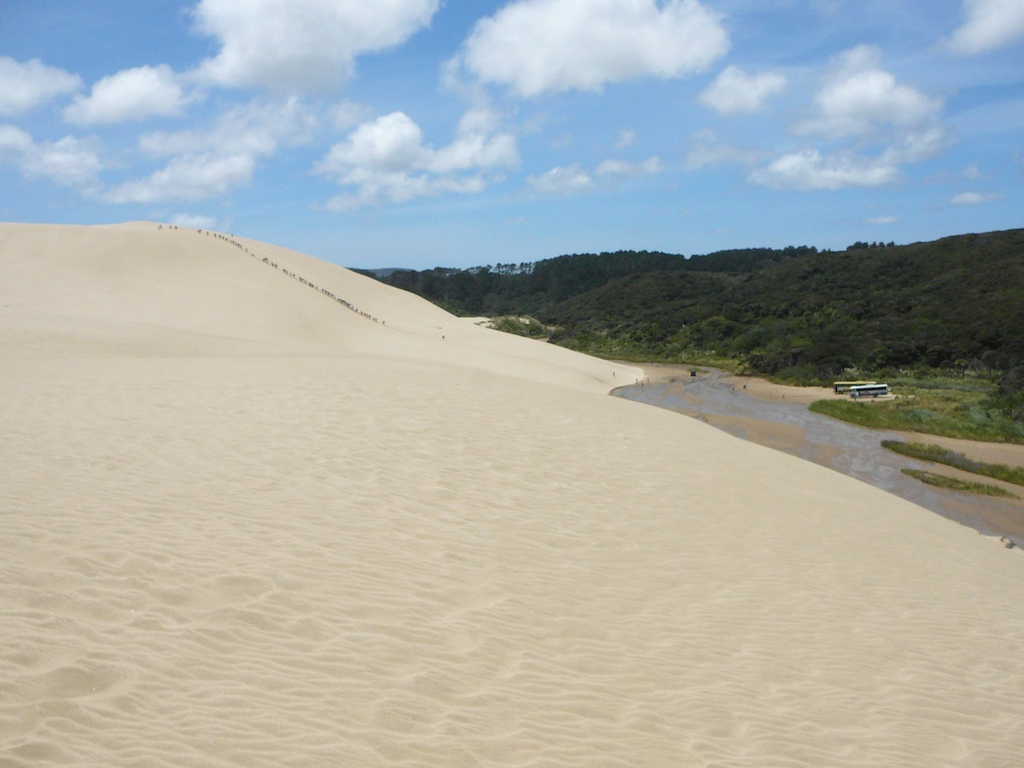
Sand forest from afar

A sand forest is a type of rare subtropical forest region, distinctive due to its unique combination of plant (often rare plant) and animal species, and their restriction to ancient coastal dunes. Sand forests are found in Maputaland in South Africa, as well as parts of the Amazon basin in Brazil, Peru, and Colombia, along with Malaysia and Indonesia in Asia.

They are typically composed of clay soils and nutrient poor white sands. These forests are commonly referred to as "sand forests" in the South African regions. However, in Mozambique, they are known as the "Lucauati forests". In the Amazon, they are colloquially known as campinaranas and campinas, whereas in Asia they are referred to as kerangas. Few studies have been carried out on the sand forests. Those studies that have been conducted, the majority of the research has been on the plant diversity within these forests.

== Origins ==
There have been no comprehensive studies undertaken in the white sand forests. A full understanding of the process in which they have emerged is lacking. However, it is thought that the sand forests are the fragments of coastal dunes which were separated from the ocean over millions of years as the shoreline and water level slowly shifted. Researchers have speculated that these forest systems have been related to the Late Pleistocene and Holocene dry periods.

Podsolization is a process in which the upper layer of soil becomes acidic due to the leaching of nutrients. This process combined with the lack of nutrients in the upper horizon results in only white sand being left behind. Because sandy soils can result from a number of different processes (nutrient leaching, tectonic activity, river dynamics, etc.), the sand forests are unique and, oftentimes, different from sand forests found elsewhere.

== Characteristics ==
=== Biodiversity ===
Sand forests are well known for their unique biodiversity and high levels of endemism. To date there have been more than 2,500 species of vascular plants and of those, 230 species are endemic within the Maputaland region. Distinct sclerophylly, or vegetation with thickened, hardened foliage that slows moisture loss, is a characteristic of a vast number of the plants found in this region. Due to nutrient and water restrictions, the vegetation that grows in the sand forests is very specialized. Many of the trees and shrubs have evolved anti-herbivorous defenses. Herbivores seemed to favor vegetation of plants in clay soils over the white sandy soils. In no presence of herbivores however, the clay soil vegetation survived just as well as white sand specialists, but grew much taller and produced more leaf area.

=== Decomposition ===
Sand forests have a thick humus layer due to the extremely low decomposition rates. Some sandy forests have even been recorded to have more than a meter of leaf litter on top of the white sand. Multiple reasons exist as to why there is such a large accumulation of organic matter including high acidity of the soil, high content of toxic compounds in the litter, and low nutrient quality of the litter.

=== Vegetation ===
It is very common to find epiphytes, such as the wiry orchid (Microcoelia exilis), and other lichens growing on the trees. They derive their moisture and nutrients from the air, rain, and debris that has accumulated over time.

In contrast to tropical rainforests, campinas are "reduced in biomass and have relatively high light penetration." Due to nutrient deficiencies in campina soils, "shrubs and small trees typically have a dwarfed and rachitic aspect with reduced quantities of foliage" with many of the species being perennials and evergreens

==== List of flora ====
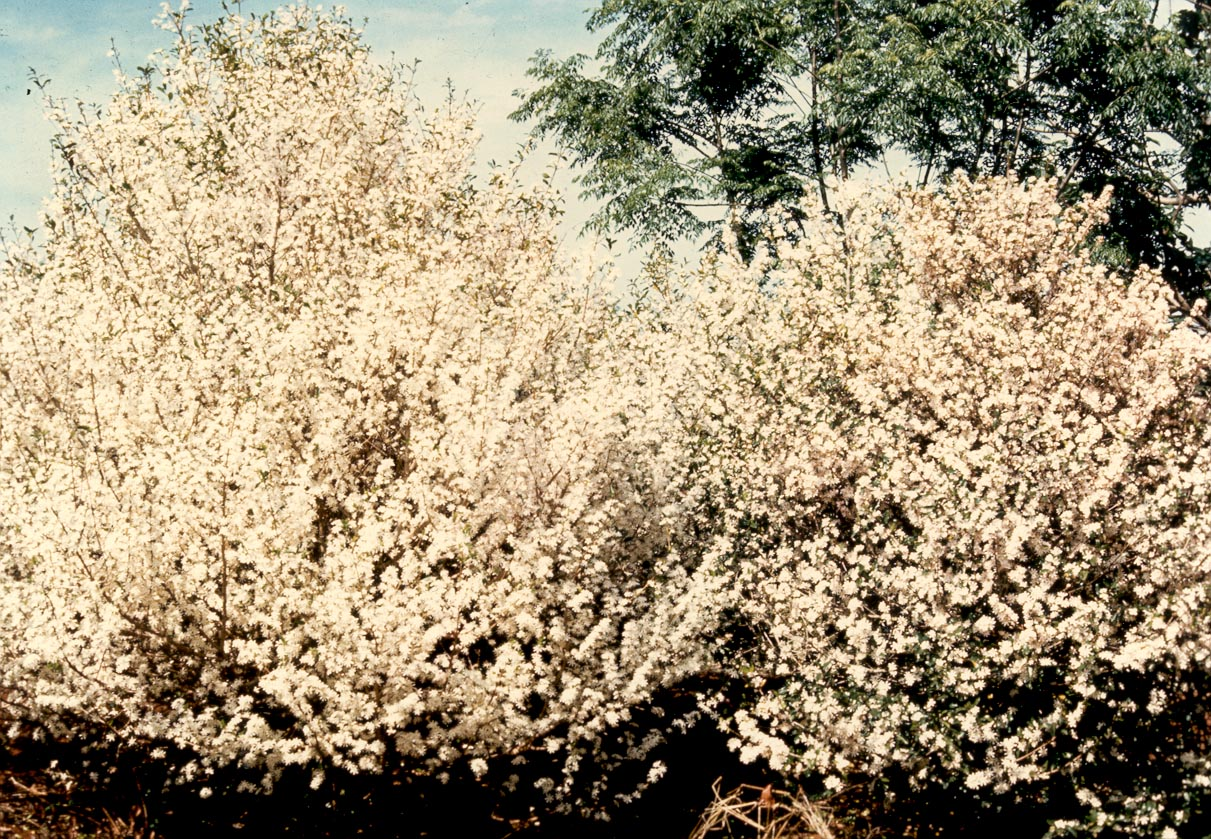
Coffea racemosa plant

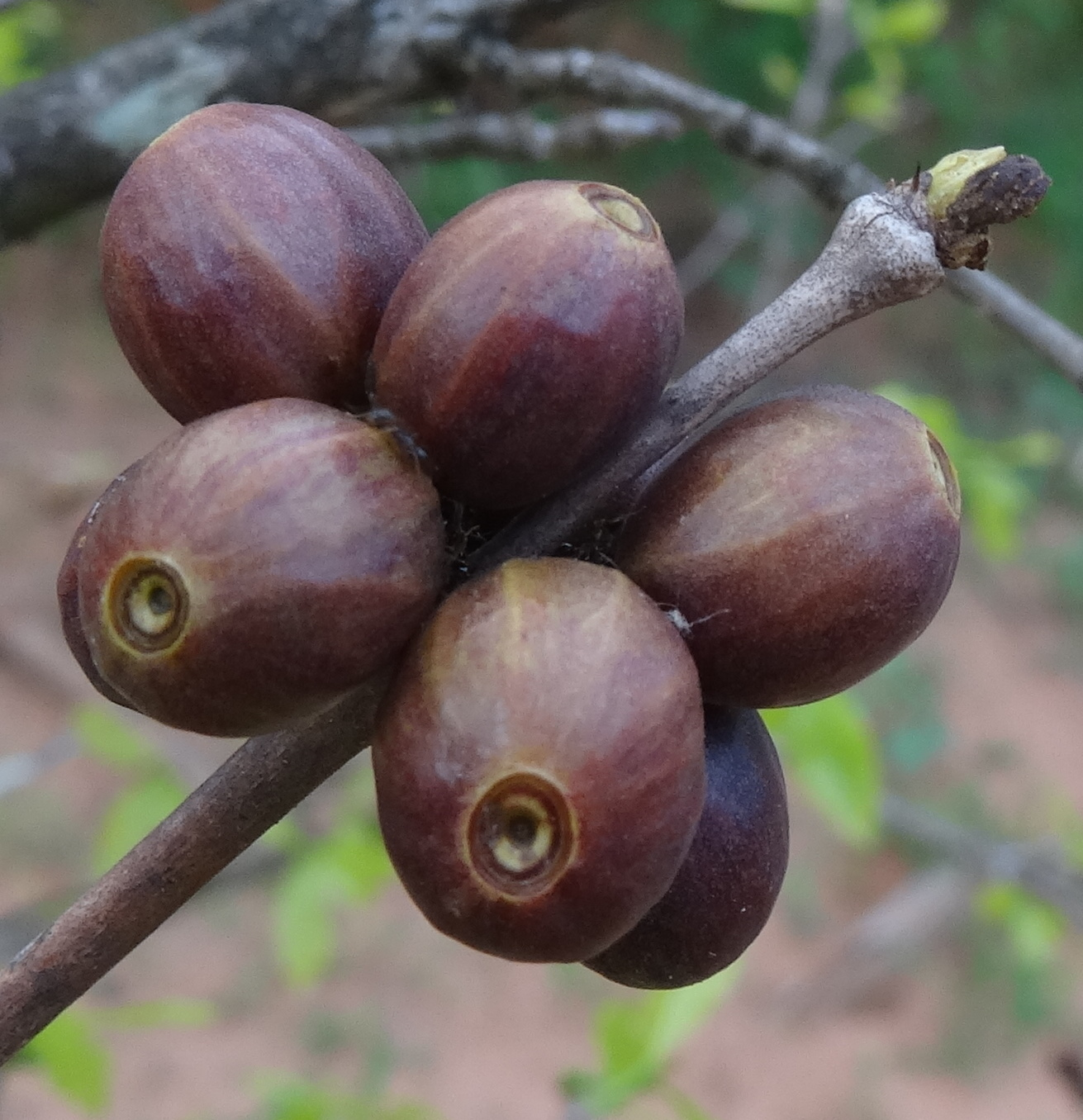
Close-up of Coffea racemosa berries

- Clusiaceae
- Pachira brevipes
- Sali (Tetragastris panamensis)
- Eperua spp.
- Ocotea spp.
- Hortia spp.
- Inga spp.
- Ferdinandusa chlorantha
- Euterpe catinga
- Dendropanax umbellatus
- Stigonema tomentosum
- False tamboti (Cleisanthus schlechteri)
- False white ash (Pseudobersama mossambicensis)
- Flat-crown (Albizia adianthifolia)
- Galla-plum (Haplocoelum gallense)
- Glossy flat-bean (Dalbergia nitidula)
- Green thorn (Balanites maughamii)
- Green-apple (Monodora junodii)
- Large cluster-pear (Uvaria lucida subsp. virens)
- Lavender fever-berry (Croton gratissimus)
- Lavender-leaved croton (Croton pseudopulchellus)
- Lebombo wattle (Newtonia hildebrandtii)
- Lowveld milkberry (Manilkara mochisia)
- Marsh fever-berry (Croton steenkampianus)
- Mozambique coffee (Coffea racemosa)
- Pink lannea (Lannea antiscorbutica)
- Pod mahogany (Afzelia quanzensis)
- Quar (Psydrax obovata)
- Quiver-leaf fig (Ficus tremula)
- Red-hair bush (Lasiodiscus pervillei subsp. pervillei)
- Red-heart tree (Hymenocarida ulmoides)
- Saddle-pod (Wrightia natalensis)
- Sand cabbage tree (Cussonia arenicola)
- Sand canary-berry (Suregada zanzibariensis)
- Sand forest gardenia (Hyperacanthus microphyllus)
- Sand ivory (Berchemia sp. nov.)
- Sand forest hum-num (Carissa tetramera)
- Sand knobwood (Zanthoxylon leprieuri)
- Sherbet tree (Dialium schlechteri)
- Sneezewood (Ptaeroxylon obliquum)
- Stink bushwillow (Pteleopsis myrtifolia)
- Swazi ordeal tree (Erythrophleum lasianthum)
- Tonga-kerrie (Cladostemon kirkii)
- Water ironplum (Drypetes arguta)
- Wild mandarin (Toddaliopsis bremekampii)
- Wild mango (Cordyla africana)
- Zulu coshwood (Cola greenwayi)
- Zulu loquat (Oxyanthus latifolius)

=== Hydrology ===
Sand forests have vegetation gradients that closely coincide with saturation gradients. These saturation gradients are affected by rainfall and topography and, therefore, the vegetation is also affected by these same factors. Vegetation lower to the ground tends to congregate in areas that have been saturated for the longest period of time.

Blackwater rivers (e.g. the Rio Negro) commonly begin in these sand forests due to their accumulation of humic matter that is easily washed downstream, particularly after heavy rainfall.

=== Birds ===
The majority of bird species found in sand forests is known to prefer sand forest habitat and are found rarely, if at all, in other types of habitats. There have been no studies, however, evaluating the habitat specialization of sand forest birds to determine whether these habitats have unique bird fauna.

The majority of these birds are small ground dwellers. They often forage in the underbrush to find food because of the thick organic layers found in the sand forests. Their sharp beaks allow them to break through the thick coating of fruits and obtain the seeds inside.

==== List of bird species ====
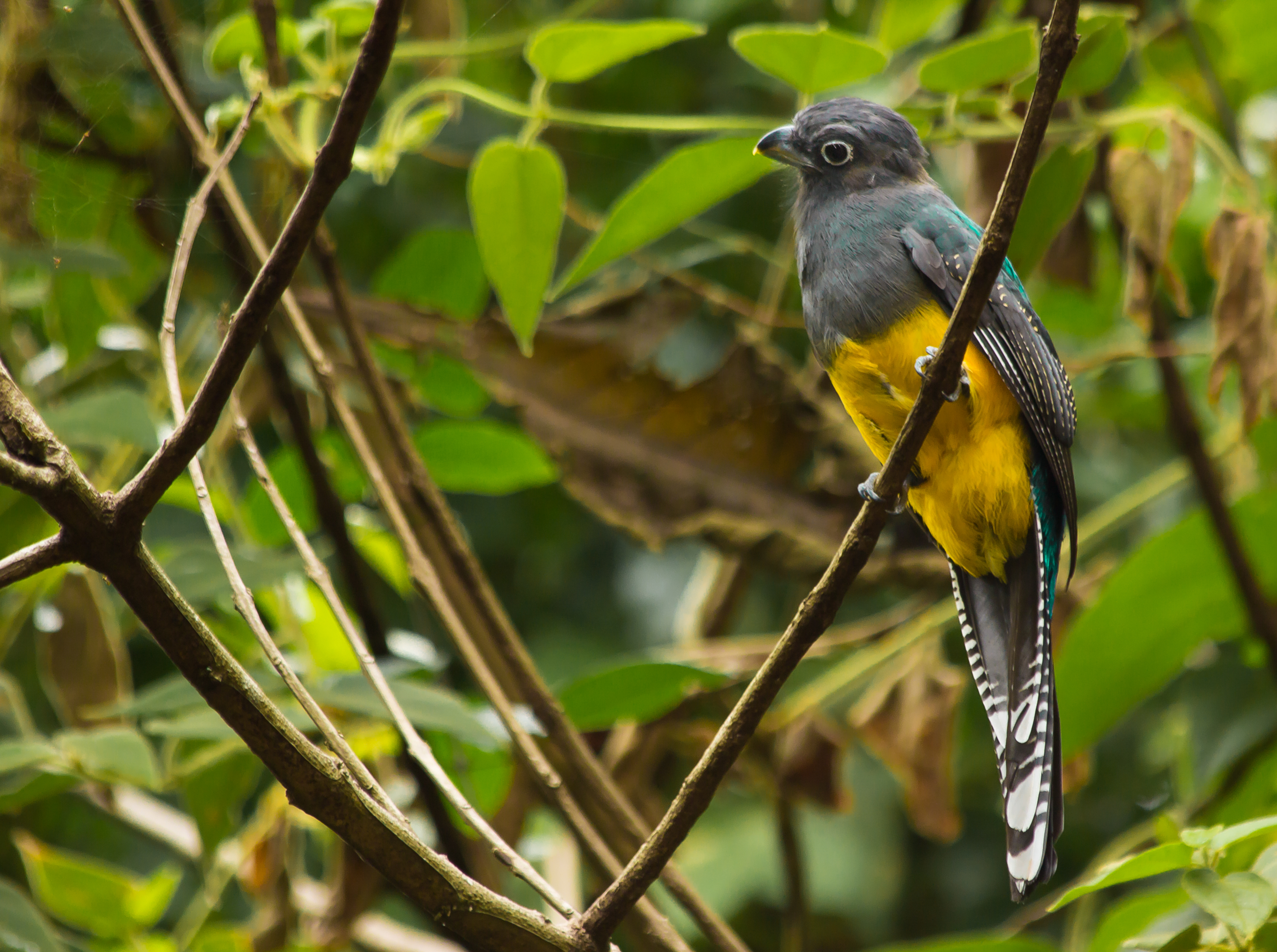
Trogon rufus perching on limb

- Attila citriniventris
- Claravis pretiosa
- Cnemotriccus duidae
- Crypturellus strigilosus
- Conopias parva
- Crytpturellus duidae
- Deconychura longicauda
- Dixiphia pipra
- Galbula dea
- Hemitriccus minimus
- Herpsilochmus gentryi
- Heterocercus aurantiivertex
- Hypocnemis hypoxantha
- Lepidocolaptes albolineatus
- Megastictus margaritatus
- Myrmeciza castanea
- Myrmotherula leucophthalma
- Neopelma chrysocephalum
- Neopipo cinnamomea
- Notharchus ordii
- Percnostola arenarum
- Pithys castanea
- Platyrinchus saturatus
- Polioptila sp. nov.
- Polytmus theresiae
- Ramphotrigon ruficauda
- Sclerurus rufigularis
- Tachyphonus phoenicius
- Trogon rufus
- Xenopipo atronitens
- Xipholena punicea
- Zimmerius villarejoi

== The role of fire ==
The exact role of fires in sand forests is not known and most studies disagree on the matter. However, evidence has shown that fires can help increase species diversity, particularly those that are specialized for such areas. For example, fire tolerant species may be more likely to colonize here.

Historically speaking, some sand forests may have been the result of anthropogenic burning done by indigenous people. They would burn swaths of sand forest to obtain better hunting and farming grounds.

Fires of any kind can have both positive and negative effects on the ecosystem. In some instances, a fire can cause one or just a few species to predominate when the forest begins to regenerate. However, fire can also promote more diversity within the regenerated forest.

== Threats ==
Because sand forests are isolated in small patches, they have been mostly protected from the destruction of the Amazon rainforest. However, they are still at risk of disturbance. Sand forests are extremely sensitive to destruction due to the harsh growth and survival conditions. Since the conditions are so tough to thrive in once an ecosystem declines, it may take hundreds of years for it to develop again.

Some sand forests overlap with protected areas and indigenous lands, but most do not. Although they are not immediately threatened, sand forests are still in danger from ever-increasing deforestation, hydroelectric projects, and mineral extractions.

== Conservation ==
Peru has actively incorporated sand forests in three protected areas. Authors who have done research in campinas have also made recommendations for conservation in their work.

== See also ==
- Southern African Sand Forest
