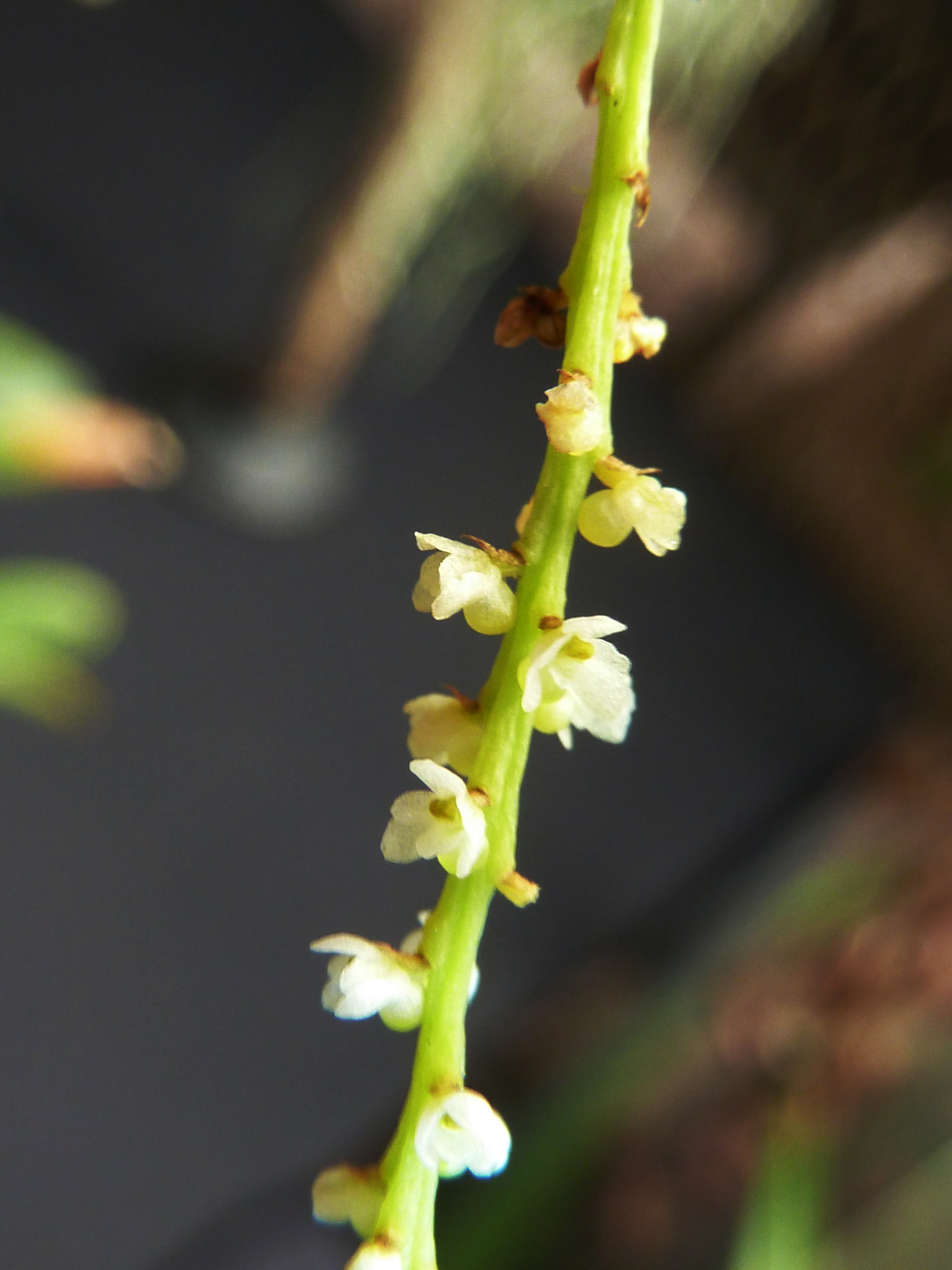
- Pendent inflorescence with white flowers

Scientific classification
- Kingdom: Plantae
- Clade: Tracheophytes
- Clade: Angiosperms
- Clade: Monocots
- Order: Asparagales
- Family: Orchidaceae
- Subfamily: Epidendroideae
- Genus: Microcoelia
- Species: M. exilis

Binomial name
- Microcoelia exilis Lindl.

Synonyms
- Angraecum chiloschistae Rchb.f.; Epidorkis exilis (Lindl.) Kuntze; Gussonea chiloschistae (Rchb.f.) Schltr.; Gussonea exilis (Lindl.) Ridl.; Mystacidium exilis (Lindl.) T. Durand & Schinz; Rhaphidorhynchus chiloschistae (Rchb.f.) Finet

= Microcoelia exilis =

Species of orchid

Microcoelia exilis, commonly known as the pinhead orchid, is a species of flowering plant in the orchid family, Orchidaceae. It is a leafless epiphyte, a perennial herb that grows in a tangled cluster of roots and stems on the branch of a tree. This orchid is native to tropical central and eastern Africa and was first described in 1830 by the English botanist John Lindley.

== Description ==
The stem is up to 45 mm (1.8 in) long and 2 to 3 mm (0.08 to 0.12 in) in diameter. The much-branched aerial roots may be either broad or slender and form a tangled mass; many are not attached to the substrate. There are no true leaves but scale leaves are up to 2 to 3 mm (0.08 to 0.12 in) long, and are either beak-like or the apex tapers to a long point; they each have five to eight nerves. There may be multiple inflorescences up to 25 cm (10 in) long, either erect or arching. Each inflorescence has fifty or more minute white flowers with yellowish-green, globose spurs.

== Distribution and habitat ==
Microcoelia exilis is native to tropical central and eastern Africa. Its range includes Uganda, Kenya, Tanzania, the Democratic Republic of Congo, Malawi, Zambia, Zimbabwe, Mozambique and South Africa. It grows on the small branches and twigs of trees (or occasionally on rocks) in gallery forests, woodland, secondary forests and plantations, at elevations of up to about 1,800 m (6,000 ft).

== Ecology ==
In the Southern African Sand Forest, a region of ancient dunes in southern Mozambique and northern KwaZulu-Natal, trees such as Newtonia hildebrandtii, Cola greenwayi and Drypetes arguta are swathed in epiphytes including Microcoelia exilis, and Usnea and other species of lichen.

== Culivation ==
This orchid is sometimes cultivated as a houseplant, attached to a twig and misted at intervals. Trade in this orchid is regulated under CITES Appendix II.
