= Southern African Sand Forest =

Subtropical forest in Mozambique and South Africa

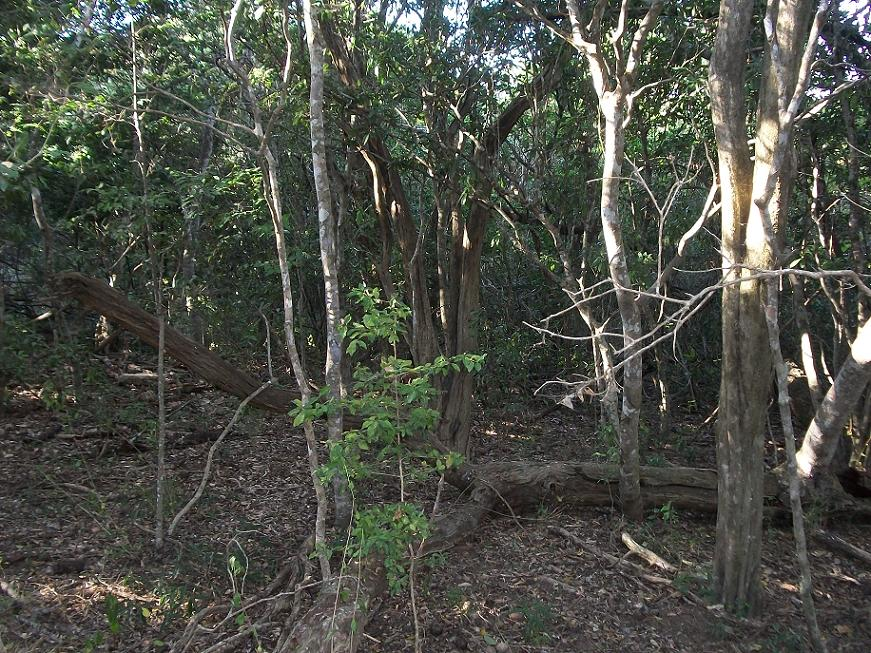
Sand Forest at Nibela Peninsula, Lake St Lucia, KwaZulu-Natal

Southern African Sand Forest is a sand forest, or a subtropical forest plant community of the tropical and subtropical dry broadleaf forests biome. It grows on ancient sand dunes in northern KwaZulu-Natal and southern Mozambique. In South Africa these forests are known simply as Sand Forest, while in Mozambique they are known as Licuati Forest. The Southern African sand forest is part of the Maputaland coastal forest mosaic ecoregion.

== Origins ==
Sand forests are thought to be relics of coastal dune forests, which have been separated from the ocean for more than a million years as the shoreline has shifted slowly eastwards over the millennia. Dunes have accreted on the southeast African coastal plain since the Pliocene, and frequent sand mobilization events during climatic changes have resulted in some reworking of the dunes. The geological history of the region suggests that the current ecosystems here may be of recent derivation and many endemic plant taxa comply with the concept of neo-endemics (recent locally evolved species), and biological evolution (notably speciation) is still in an active phase.

== Characteristics ==
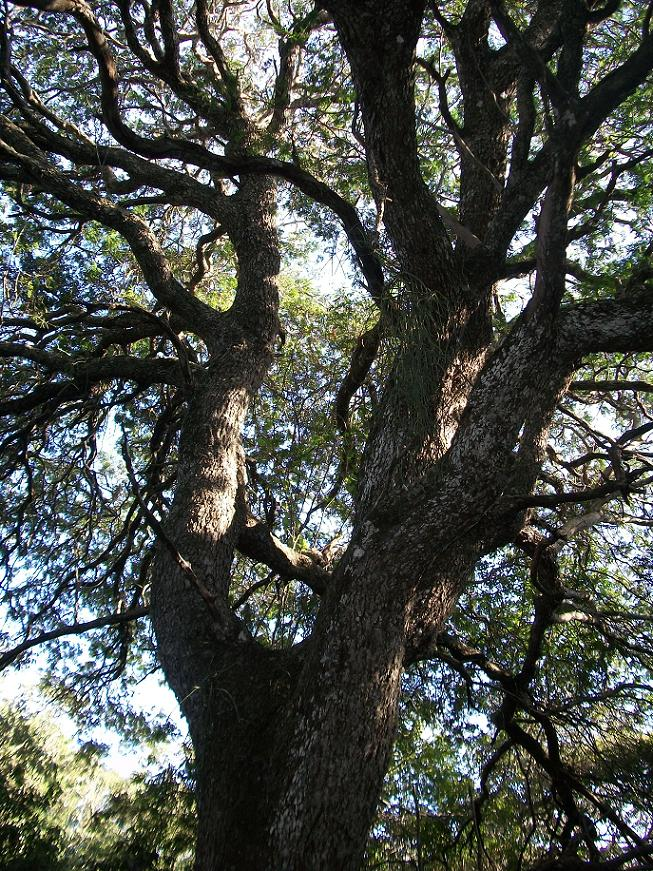
Newtonia hildebrandtii (a characteristic sand forest species) at Nibela Peninsula

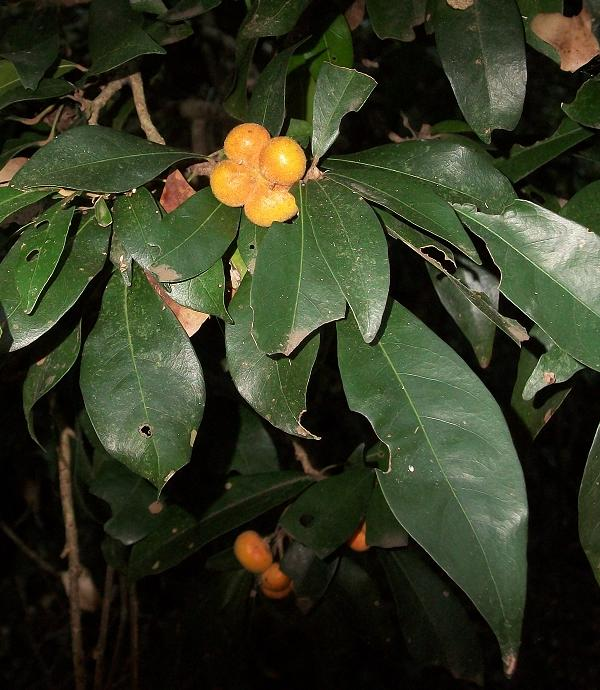
Cola greenwayi at Nibela Peninsula

Of the 225 Maputaland Centre plant endemic species, 30 are associated with sand forest and 20 are restricted to this vegetation type. Species typical of moist forests, such as ferns and mosses are scarce, and the activities of termites appear to limit the accumulation of leaf litter. Sand forest has a distinct boundary and also exhibits a narrow zone of 1–2 m of nearly bare soil directly bordering it. There are indications that sand forest has allelopathic effects which may bring about this zone of inhibition and this aids in limiting fires spreading from the neighboring savannah into the forest; creating a unique environment for itself.

== List of trees (Incomplete) ==
List references

- False Tamboti (Cleisanthus schlechteri)
- False White Ash (Pseudobersama mossambicensis)
- Flat-crown (Albizia adianthifolia)
- Galla-plum (Haplocoelum gallense)
- Glossy Flat-bean (Dalbergia nitidula)
- Green Thorn (Balanites maughamii)
- Green-apple (Monodora junodii)
- Large Cluster-pear (Uvaria lucida subsp. virens)
- Lavender Fever-berry (Croton gratissimus)
- Lavender-leaved Croton (Croton pseudopulchellus)
- Lebombo Wattle (Newtonia hildebrandtii)
- Lowveld Milkberry (Manilkara mochisia)
- Marsh Fever-berry (Croton steenkampianus)
- Mozambique Coffee (Coffea racemosa)
- Pink Lannea (Lannea antiscorbutica)
- Pod Mahogany (Afzelia quanzensis)
- Quar (Psydrax obovata)
- Quiver-leaf Fig (Ficus tremula)
- Red-hair Bush (Lasiodiscus pervillei subsp. pervillei)
- Red-heart Tree (Hymenocarida ulmoides)
- Saddle-pod (Wrightia natalensis)
- Sand Cabbage Tree (Cussonia arenicola)
- Sand Canary-berry (Suregada zanzibariensis)
- Sand Forest Gardenia (Hyperacanthus microphyllus)
- Sand Ivory (Berchemia sp. nov.)
- Sand Forest Num-num (Carissa tetramera)
- Sand knobwood (Zanthoxylon leprieuri)
- Sherbet Tree (Dialium schlechteri)
- Sneezewood (Ptaeroxylon obliquum)
- Stink Bushwillow (Pteleopsis myrtifolia)
- Swazi Ordeal Tree (Erythrophleum lasianthum)
- Tonga-kerrie (Cladostemon kirkii)
- Water Ironplum (Drypetes arguta)
- Wild Mandarin (Toddaliopsis bremekampii)
- Wild Mango (Cordyla africana)
- Zulu Coshwood (Cola greenwayi)
- Zulu Loquat (Oxyanthus latifolius)

== See also ==
- Forests of KwaZulu-Natal
