= Chebo people =

The Chebo or Chabo are an ethnic group of the Southwest Shewa Zone and West Shewa Zone in the Oromia Region of south-west Ethiopia. The Chebo speak the Oromo language and never claim as they were descended from Gurage ethnic group. Their religion is Ethiopia Orthodox Christianity, the livelihood of the Chebo-Inchini area is described as enset (Ethiopian banana), barley, and cattle.

== Name ==
One possible explanation of the name Chebo is from the Chebe plant, Croton gratissimus (lavender croton), which is normally burned during Meskel damera celebrations.

Another possible explanation is the name of the area where the Chebo people live. Parts of the south west Shewa Zone had been incorporated in Chebo and Gurage districts in the Shewa province, as it was called prior to 1995.

== Notable Chebo ==
- Habegiorgis Dinegde (ABBA Mala)
