= Mfuwe Lodge =

Lodge in Zambia

Coordinates: 13.0828°S 31.7928°E

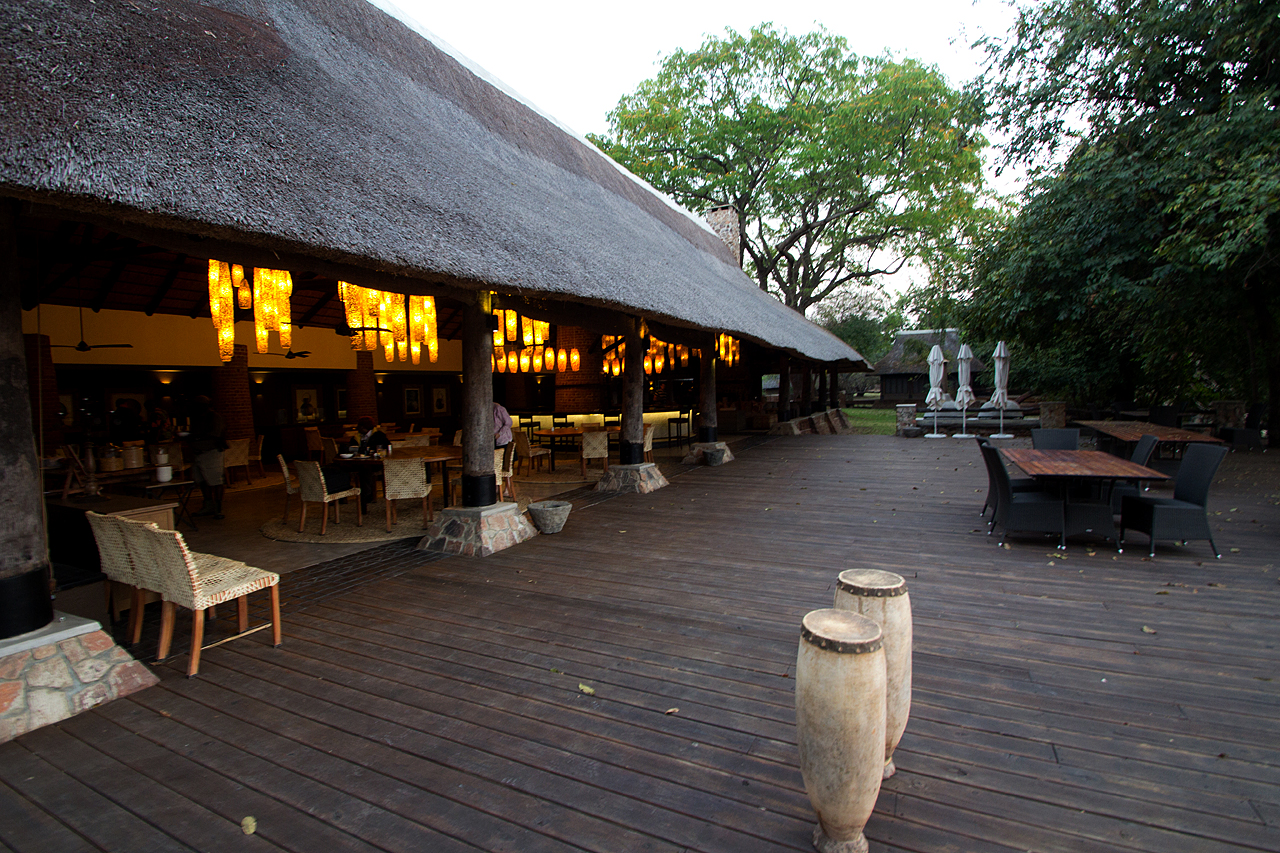
Mfuwe Lodge Dining Area.

Mfuwe Lodge is a safari lodge overlooking Mfuwe Lagoon in South Luangwa National Park, Zambia, just five minutes’ drive from the main gate. It comprises 18 chalets which were completely refurbished in 2010. There is an adjoining Bush Spa offering massages and other spa treatments.

The Lodge, open 365 days a year, is owned by The Bushcamp Company, which also operates six Bushcamps in the Park, along the Luangwa and Kapamba Rivers. Visitors often combine a stay at the Lodge with stays at the Bushcamps.

South Luangwa National Park is renowned for its prolific wildlife, including lion, leopard, giraffe, buffalo, antelope, elephants, and crocodile. From late October through early December, a small herd of elephants regularly wander right through the lobby, lured by a wild mango tree in the lodge's central courtyard (which the structure was built around).
