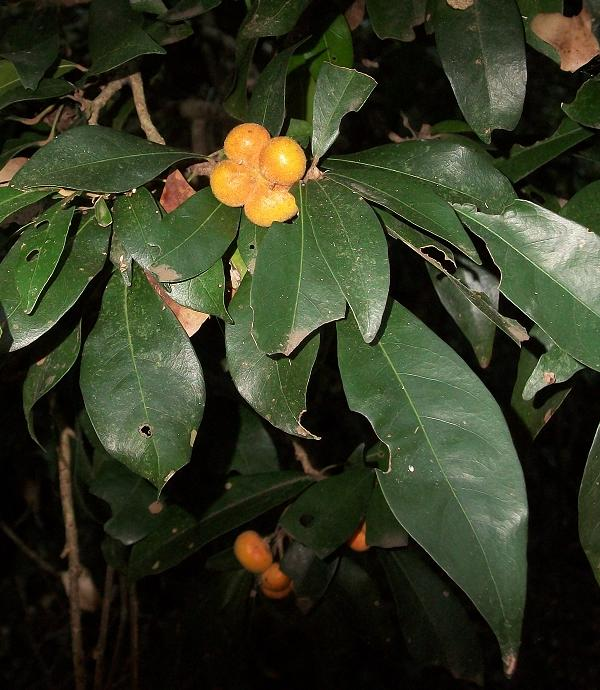
- Cola greenwayi at Nibela Peninsula

Scientific classification
- Kingdom: Plantae
- Clade: Tracheophytes
- Clade: Angiosperms
- Clade: Eudicots
- Clade: Rosids
- Order: Malvales
- Family: Malvaceae
- Genus: Cola
- Species: C. greenwayi

Binomial name
- Cola greenwayi Brenan

Synonyms
- Cola microcarpa

= Cola greenwayi =

Species of flowering plant

Cola greenwayi, commonly known as hairy cola or Zulu coshwood, is a species of flowering plant in the family Malvaceae. It was first described in 1956 by the British botanist John Patrick Micklethwait Brenan. It is native to southeastern Africa.

== Description ==
Cola greenwayi is a small to medium-sized evergreen tree growing to around 20 m (66 ft), either monoecious or dioecious. The smaller branches and twigs are brown and densely hairy at first. The leaves are alternate, purplish-brown when young and dark green and leathery when older, up to 15 by 5 cm (6 by 2 in). They are stalked, simple, elliptical or oblanceolate, and have prominent veins. There is a hairy swelling known as a pulvinus at the base of each leaf-blade, which acts as a hinge. The flowers are in clusters growing in the axils of the leaves. They have small, rusty-brown, hairy bracts. The calyx has four to six lobes and there are no petals. The four to five carpels turn yellowish-orange when ripe, making a sub-globose fruit, hairy at first, and later with a thin, brittle rind. It usually contains one or two seeds.

== Distribution and habitat ==
This tree is native to southeastern Africa, its range extending from Kenya and Tanzania southwards to Zimbabwe and Mozambique, Transvaal and eastern KwaZulu-Natal. Its habitat is dense forest, often on steep slopes, from sea level up to about 1,100 m (3,600 ft). It is also part of the typical flora of the Southern African Sand Forest which grows on ancient sand dunes on the border of northern KwaZulu-Natal and southern Mozambique.

== Varieties ==
Two varieties are accepted:

- Cola greenwayi var. greenwayi
- Cola greenwayi var. keniensis Brenan
