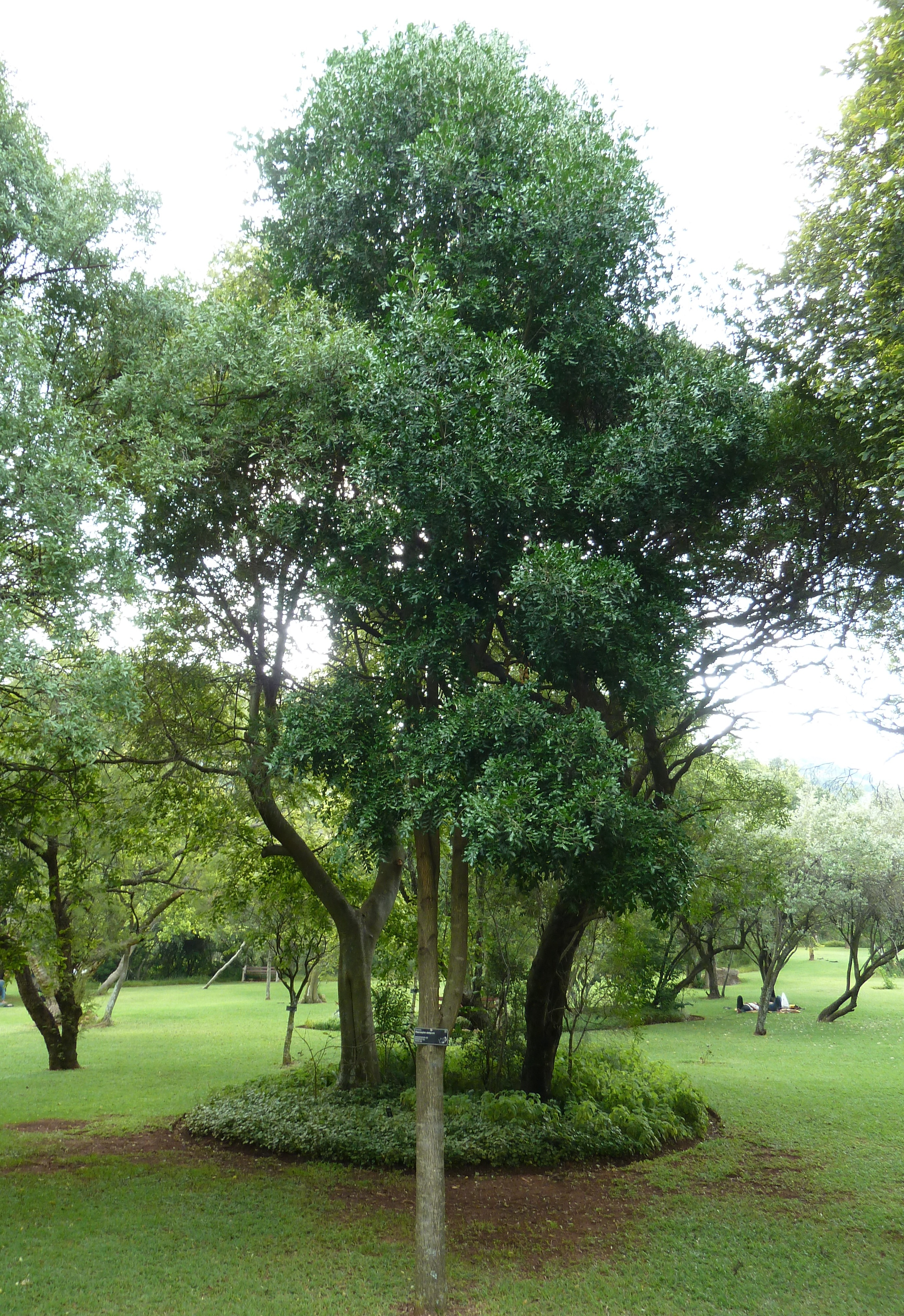

Scientific classification
- Kingdom: Plantae
- Clade: Tracheophytes
- Clade: Angiosperms
- Clade: Eudicots
- Clade: Rosids
- Order: Sapindales
- Family: Rutaceae
- Subfamily: Cneoroideae
- Genus: Ptaeroxylon; Eckl. & Zeyh.
- Species: P. obliquum

Binomial name
- Ptaeroxylon obliquum (Thunb.) Radlk.

Synonyms
- Ptaeroxylon utile Eckl. & Zeyh.

= Ptaeroxylon =

Sneeze-wood

Genus of trees

Ptaeroxylon obliquum is the botanical name for the sneezewood tree. It is native to Southern Africa, including South Africa, Zimbabwe, and Mozambique. It is the only species in the genus Ptaeroxylon.

== Background ==
Ptaeroxylon obliquum is a species from the family Rutaceae which are most abundant in South Africa and Australia. The term ptaeroxylon is Greek for sneeze and wood, while obliquum denotes the oblique shape of the leaflets. The wood produces oils containing nieshoutol, which causes violent sneeze attacks by workers who are exposed to the tree. Though sneezewood is not poisonous, it has been known to cause respiratory complications. It has been linked to asthma, rhinitis and mucosal inflammation.

== Description ==
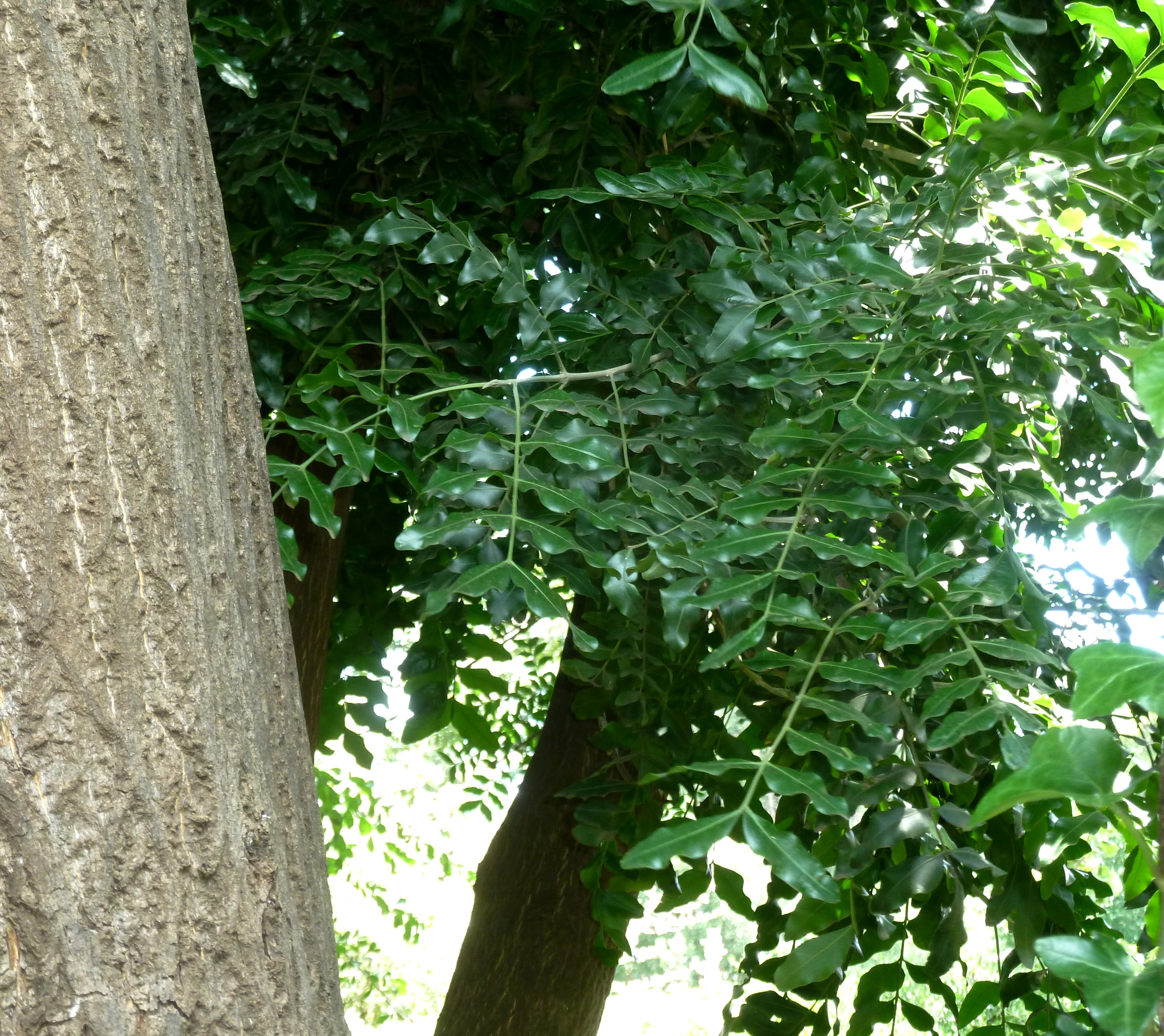
Foliage

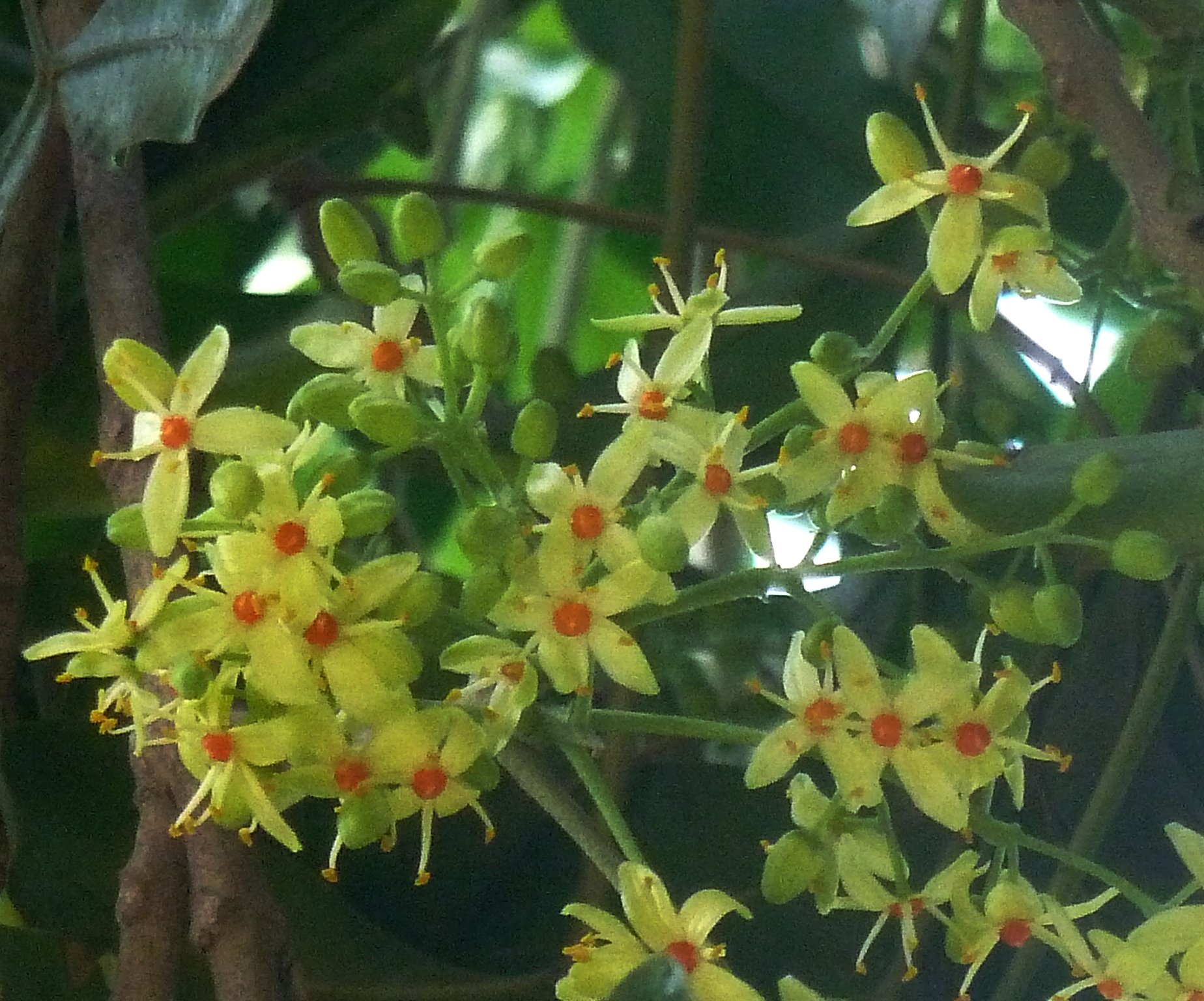
Male flowers

Ptaeroxylon obliquum is a shrub or medium deciduous tree that stands up to 15 metres (49 ft) tall. The bark is whitish-grey and smooth when young, but fissured with age. Leaflets are 2.5 x 1.3 cm marked asymmetrically. They are blue-green to dark green in color and crowd near the ends of the rachis in three to seven pairs of leaflets. The flowers on the tree are white to creamy yellow and fragrant.

Sneezewood is very dense having a specific gravity of 1040 kg/m^{3}

== Uses ==
=== Lumber ===
Sneezewood is an extremely hard and durable timber wood. It often lasts longer than brass or iron when used for machine bearings.

In the past, sneezewood was used extensively for railway sleepers. It can also be used to make furniture. In Mozambique it is used to make xylophone keys.

Sneezewood is a very attractive wood with golden heartwood with light orange figures and is a favorite amongst woodturners.

Its scarcity today is due in part of its past use as fuel for steam tugs. It has been used extensively for fence and telegraph poles as well.

=== Medicinal ===
Sneezewood is used for medicinal and ritual purposes. The bark can be used to repel moths or as snuff. The resin has been used to get rid of warts and cattle ticks.

The Xhosa have traditionally made snuff from sneeze-wood to relieve headaches.

== See also ==
- Southern African Sand Forest
