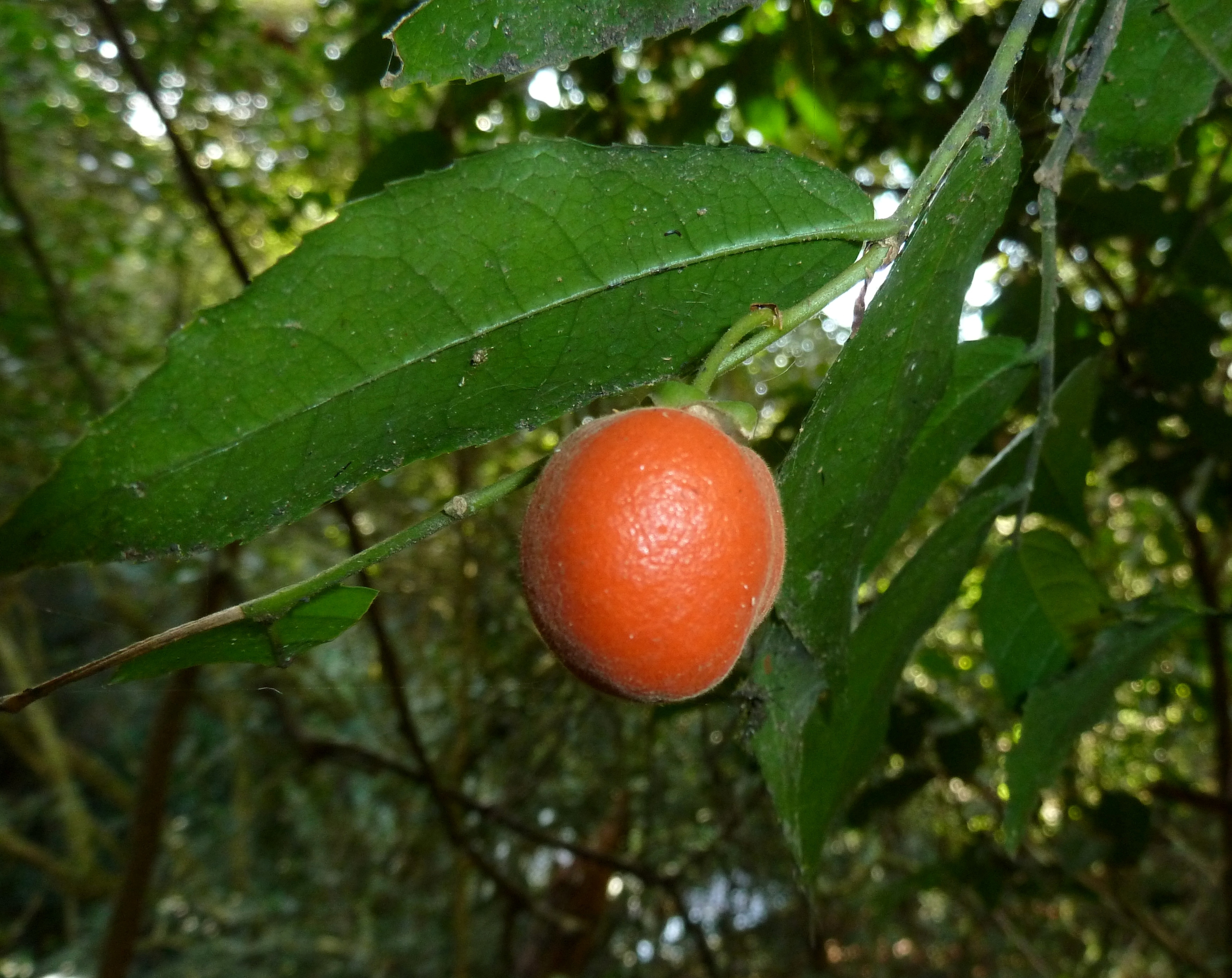
- Water ironplum fruit in Krantzkloof Nature Reserve in KwaZulu-Natal.

Scientific classification
- Kingdom: Plantae
- Clade: Tracheophytes
- Clade: Angiosperms
- Clade: Eudicots
- Clade: Rosids
- Order: Malpighiales
- Family: Putranjivaceae
- Genus: Drypetes
- Species: D. arguta

Binomial name
- Drypetes arguta (Müll.Arg.) Hutch. (1920)

Synonyms
- Cyclostemon argutus Müll.Arg. (1866)

= Drypetes arguta =

Species of tree

Drypetes arguta, commonly known as the water ironplum, is a species of small tree or large bush in the family Putranjivaceae. It is native to tropical East Africa. It was first described in 1920 by the English botanist John Hutchinson, who named it Cyclostemon argutus. It was later transferred to the genus Drypetes.

== Description ==
Drypetes arguta is a small tree or large straggling shrub, growing to a height of about 8 m (26 ft). The bark is grey, either smooth or with fine vertical furrows. The leaves have short stalks and a pair of yellow linear stipules at the base, and are arranged alternately on slender, greyish twigs. They are bright green, up to 11 cm (4.3 in) long, elliptical to lanceolate, with uneven bases and attenuated tips. There are glands at the tips of the marginal teeth. The flowers grow in clusters or singly in the axils of the leaves. They are unisexual, with male flowers being on a different tree from female flowers. They are yellowish-green and fragrant, and are followed by globular, fleshy fruit up to 2 cm (0.8 in) in diameter which turn orangish-red as they ripen.

== Distribution and habitat ==
Drypetes arguta is native to eastern Africa where its range extends from Tanzania and Zimbabwe, southwards to Mozambique, Eswatini, and South Africa (KwaZulu-Natal). It grows in forests and alongside water-courses, at elevations of up to 600 m (2,000 ft). It is also a major constituent of the flora of the Southern African Sand Forest, a habitat consisting of woodland growing on ancient sand dunes located on the border between southern Mozambique and northern KwaZulu-Natal.

== Uses ==
Sections of branches of this tree have traditionally been used in hut construction, and the wood has also been used to make sticks. The fruits are edible and have been used to make a fermented alcoholic drink.
