= Nibela Peninsula =

Peninsula in Lake St Lucia, South Africa

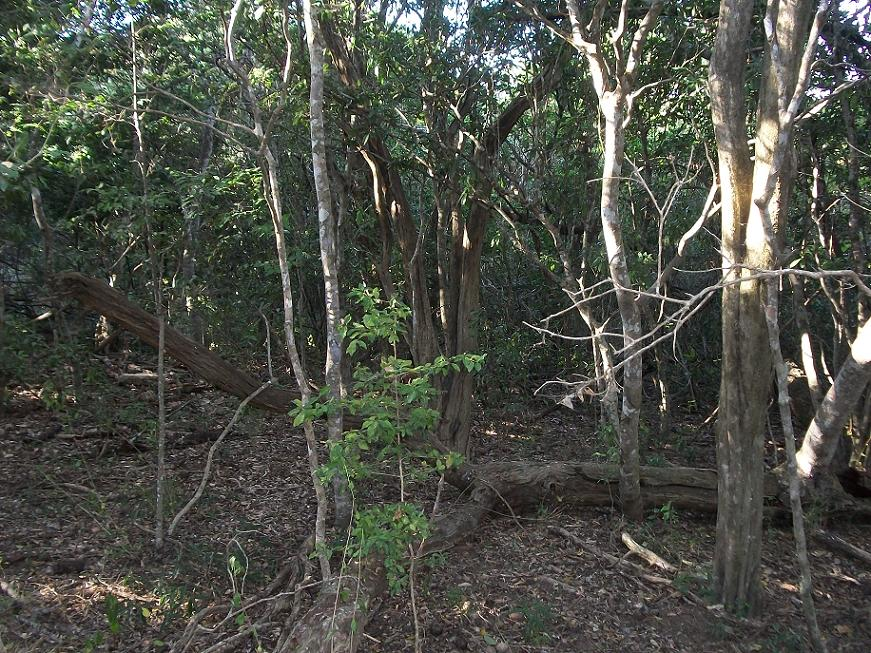
Sand forest at Nibela Peninsula

The Nibela Peninsula is the northern peninsula, which together with Nhlozi Peninsula to the south, separate False Bay from the main portion of Lake St Lucia in KwaZulu-Natal, South Africa. Though not included in iSimangaliso Wetland Park, some areas are conserved.
