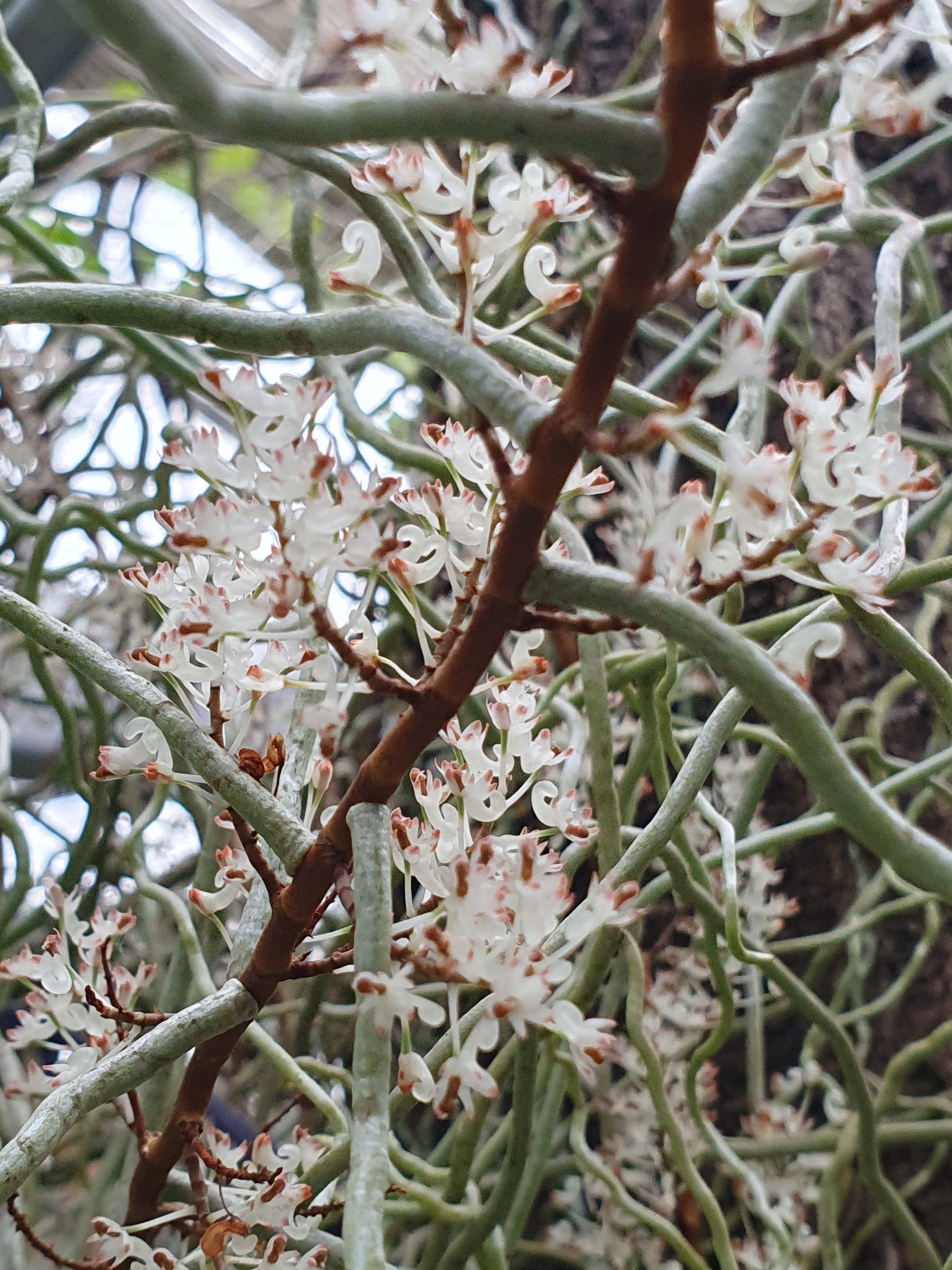
- Microcoelia aphylla (Thouars) Summerh. cultivated in the Botanical Garden of the University of Regensburg
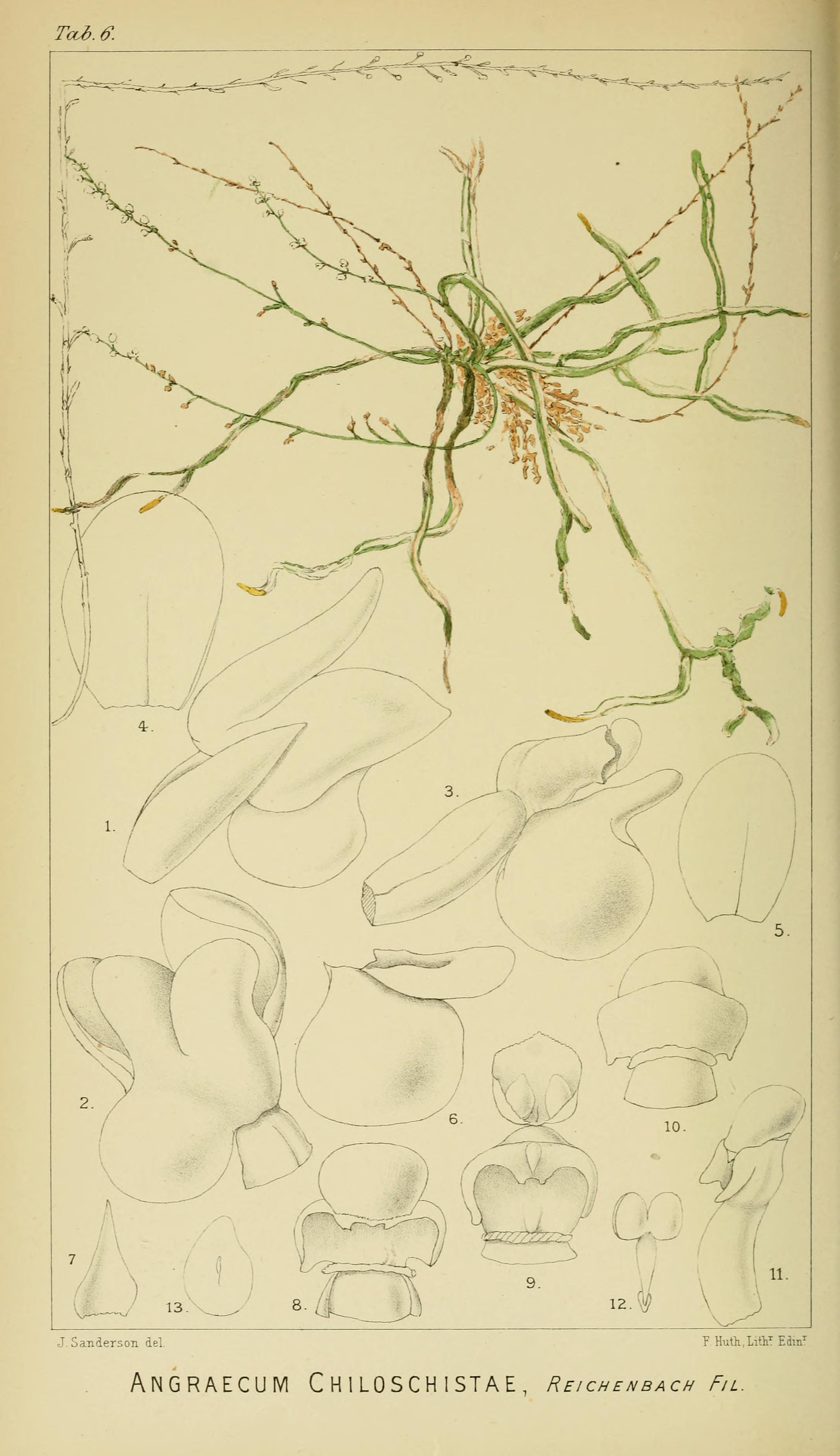
- Microcoelia exilis Lindl., 1830 (syn. Angraecum chiloschistae)

Scientific classification
- Kingdom: Plantae
- Clade: Tracheophytes
- Clade: Angiosperms
- Clade: Monocots
- Order: Asparagales
- Family: Orchidaceae
- Subfamily: Epidendroideae
- Tribe: Vandeae
- Subtribe: Angraecinae
- Genus: Microcoelia; Lindl.

Type species
- Microcoelia exilis Lindl.

Synonyms
- Microcaelia Hochst. ex A.Rich.; Dicranotaenia Finet; Rhaphidorhynchus Finet; Encheiridion Summerh.; Solenangis Schultr.

= Microcoelia =

Genus of orchids

Microcoelia is a genus of orchids native to sub-Saharan Africa as well as to Madagascar and other islands of the Indian Ocean.

- Microcoelia aphylla (Thouars) Summerh. - from Kenya and Uganda south to KwaZulu-Natal, plus Madagascar, Mauritius and Réunion
- Microcoelia aurantiaca (Schltr.) Summerh. - Madagascar
- Microcoelia bispiculata L.Jonss. - Madagascar
- Microcoelia bulbocalcarata L.Jonss. - Príncipe, Cameroon, Gabon, Uganda, Rwanda
- Microcoelia caespitosa (Rolfe) Summerh. in J.Hutchinson & J.M.Dalziel - western and central Africa from Liberia to Zaïre and Uganda
- Microcoelia corallina Summerh. - Tanzania, Mozambique, Malawi
- Microcoelia cornuta (Ridl.) Carlsward - Madagascar, Comoros
- Microcoelia decaryana L.Jonss. - Madagascar
- Microcoelia dolichorhiza (Schltr.) Summerh. - Madagascar
- Microcoelia elliotii (Finet) Summerh. - Madagascar
- Microcoelia exilis Lindl. - from Kenya and Uganda south to KwaZulu-Natal, plus Madagascar
- Microcoelia gilpinae (Rchb.f. & S.Moore) Summerh. - Madagascar
- Microcoelia globulosa (Hochst.) L.Jonss. - from Nigeria east to Eritrea, south to Angola and Zimbabwe
- Microcoelia hirschbergii Summerh. - Zaïre, Zambia
- Microcoelia jonssonii Szlach. & Olszewski - Central African Republic
- Microcoelia koehleri (Schltr.) Summerh. - from Nigeria to Tanzania, south to Zimbabwe
- Microcoelia konduensis (De Wild.) Summerh - western and central Africa
- Microcoelia leptostele (Summerh.) L.Jonss. - Central African Republic, Zaïre
- Microcoelia macrantha (H.Perrier) Summerh. - Madagascar
- Microcoelia macrorhynchia (Schltr.) Summerh. in J.Hutchinson & J.M.Dalziel - central Africa
- Microcoelia megalorrhiza (Rchb.f.) Summerh. - Kenya, Tanzania, Malawi
- Microcoelia microglossa Summerh. - central Africa
- Microcoelia moreauae L.Jonss - Kenya, Tanzania, Zimbabwe
- Microcoelia nyungwensis L.Jonss. - Rwanda
- Microcoelia obovata Summerh. - from Kenya south to KwaZulu-Natal
- Microcoelia ornithocephala P.J.Cribb - Malawi
- Microcoelia perrieri (Finet) Summerh. - Madagascar
- Microcoelia physophora (Rchb.f.) Summerh. - Kenya, Tanzania, Madagascar
- Microcoelia sanfordii L.Jonss - Cameroon
- Microcoelia smithii (Rolfe) Summerh. - Kenya, Tanzania, Malawi
- Microcoelia stolzii (Schltr.) Summerh. - Kenya, Tanzania, Malawi, Mozambique, Zambia, Zimbabwe
