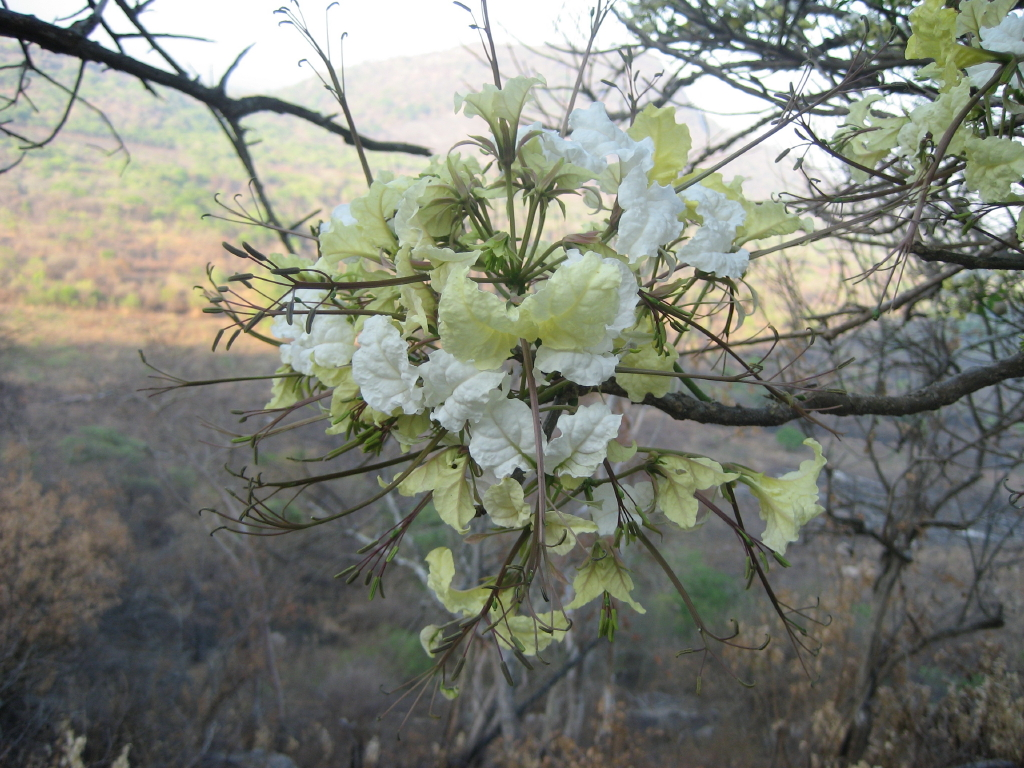

Scientific classification
- Kingdom: Plantae
- Clade: Tracheophytes
- Clade: Angiosperms
- Clade: Eudicots
- Clade: Rosids
- Order: Brassicales
- Family: Capparaceae
- Genus: Crateva
- Species: C. kirkii

Binomial name
- Crateva kirkii (Oliv.) Christenh. & Byng (2018)

Synonyms
- Cladostemon kirkii (Oliv.) Pax & Gilg (1895); Cladostemon paradoxus A.Braun & Vatke (1876); Cladostemon paxianus Gilg (1895); Euadenia kirkii Oliv. (1868); Ritchiea gigantocarpa Gilg & Gilg-Ben. (1915)

= Crateva kirkii =

Three-finger bush

Genus of flowering plants

Crateva kirkii, commonly known as the three-finger bush, is a small deciduous tree belonging to the Capparaceae or caper family. It ranges through eastern and southern Africa, including Kenya, Tanzania, Democratic Republic of the Congo, Malawi, Mozambique, Zambia, Zimbabwe, Eswatini, and KwaZulu-Natal province of South Africa.

The species is named after Sir John Kirk (1832-1922), David Livingstone's companion on his Zambezi expedition of 1858 and the first European collector of the plant near Tete in Mozambique. It was formerly placed in genus Cladostemon (klados - a branch, stemon - a stamen).

== Description ==
Crateva kirki has leaves that are trifoliolate with obovate leaflets that are glabrous with a thin texture and a common petiole up to 200 mm long. Twigs and branches are flexible and herbaceous.

The fragrant inflorescences are terminal or axillary, greenish at first, then white with pink venation, and finally turn yellow with age. The individual flowers are asymmetric, the two upper petals being much larger than the lower. The 15 cm long stamens are fused for most of their length, forming an androphore.

The large pendulous fruits are gourd-shaped, have a leathery texture and are up to 12 cm in diameter, hang from long, thick, sharply bent, jointed stalks, and give off an odour repulsive to humans on being picked.

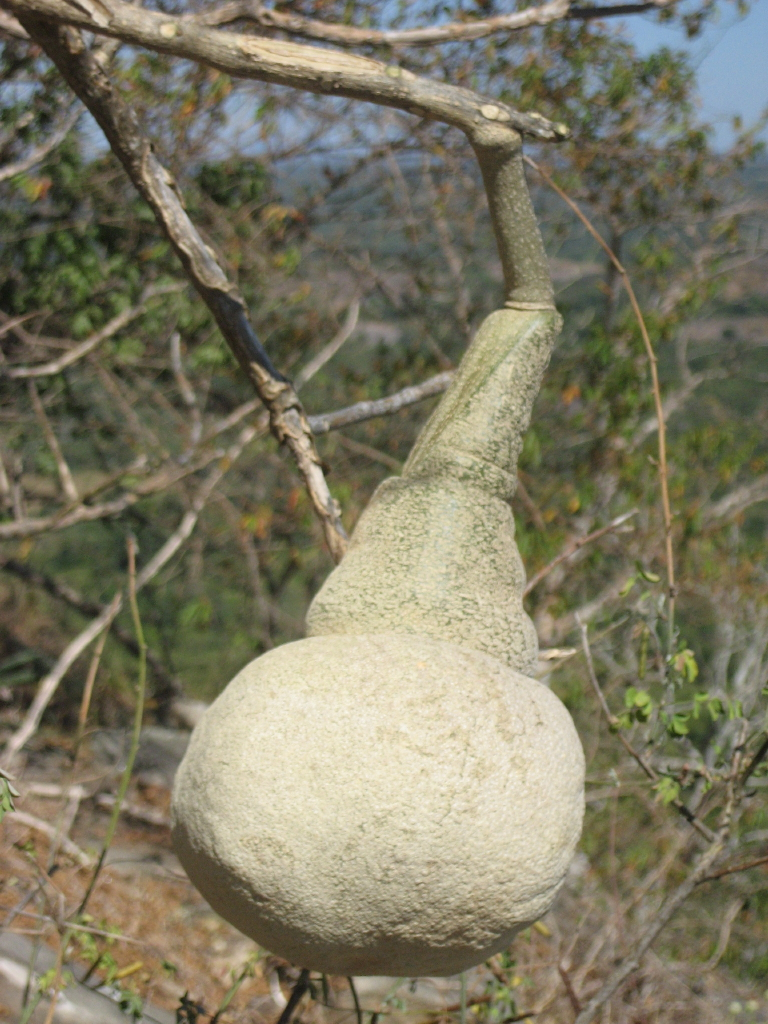
Large pendulous fruit

== Distribution ==
This tree is found in bushveld and sand forest, in open woodland and scrub, preferring sandy soils in hot areas. The animals pollinating this species' flowers are as yet unknown, while the large size of the fruit suggests eating and dispersal by a large animal such as elephant, rhino or buffalo.

Flora of Malawi, illustrates the species well and images may be seen here.

== See also ==
- Southern African Sand Forest
- List of Southern African indigenous trees and woody lianes
