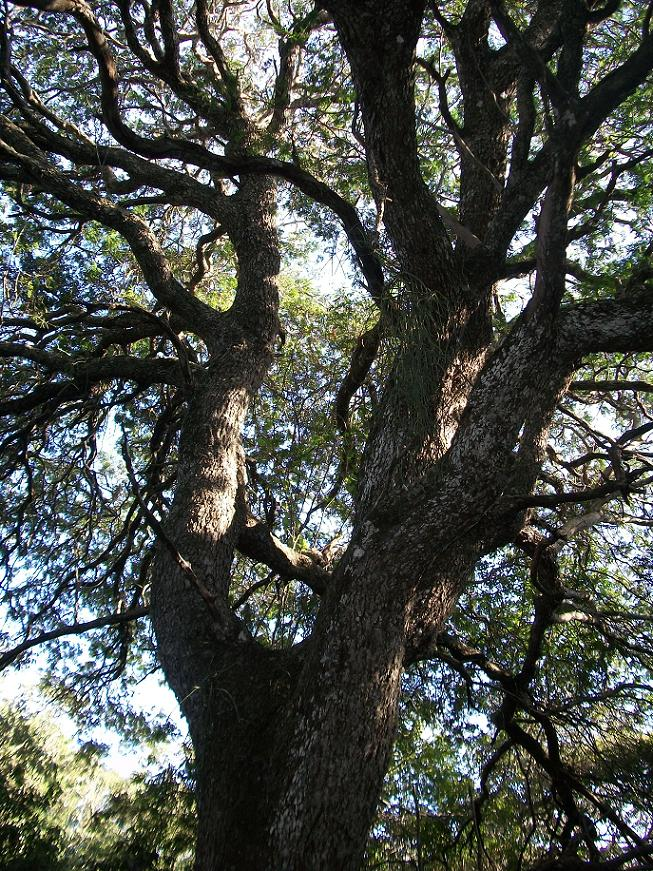

Scientific classification
- Kingdom: Plantae
- Clade: Tracheophytes
- Clade: Angiosperms
- Clade: Eudicots
- Clade: Rosids
- Order: Fabales
- Family: Fabaceae
- Subfamily: Caesalpinioideae
- Clade: Mimosoid clade
- Genus: Newtonia
- Species: N. hildebrandtii

Binomial name
- Newtonia hildebrandtii (Vatke) Torre

= Newtonia hildebrandtii =

Species of legume

Newtonia hildebrandtii, the Lebombo wattle (Afrikaans: Lebombowattel, Zulu: Umfomothi), is a medium-sized tree native to eastern Africa. It is a protected tree in South Africa.

== Description ==
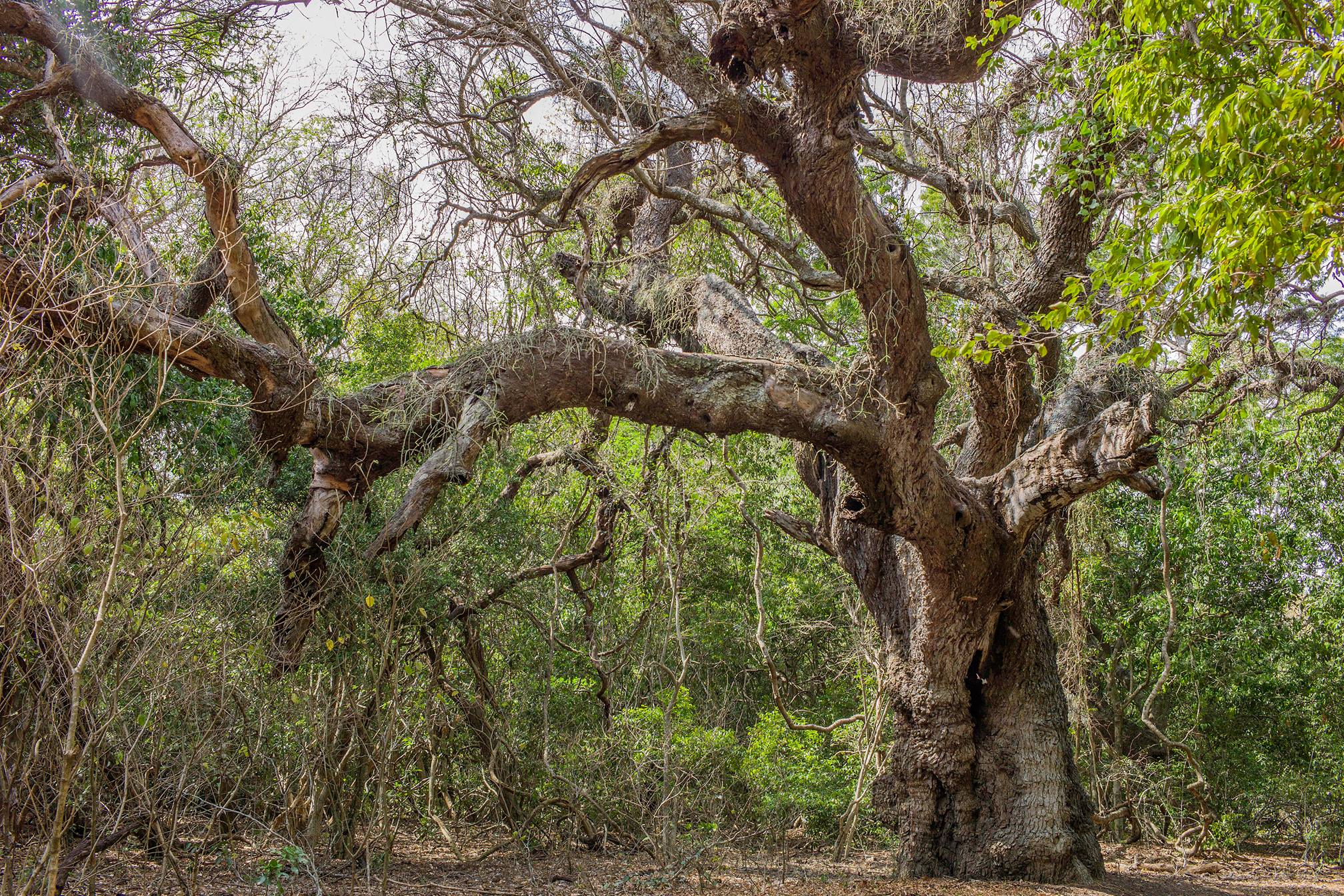
Sand Forest, St Lucia Park

Newtonia hildebrandtii is a medium-sized tree growing to a height of about 25 m (80 ft). The trunk is usually rough, and the small branchlets and twigs are puberulous (densely covered with very short soft hairs) when young. The leaves are bi-pinnate and up to 8 cm (3 in) long, each leaf having four to seven pairs of pinnae, and each pinna having six to nineteen pairs of leaflets. There is usually a gland between each pair of pinnae. The leaflets are linear or oblong and up to 11 by 3 mm (0.43 by 0.12 in) long, with the underside often having raised lateral nerves. The inflorescence is a spike up to 8 cm (3 in) long composed of whitish or creamy flowers, which are followed by flattened pods up to 30 cm (12 in) long.

== Distribution and habitat ==
This tree is found in eastern Africa, its range extending from Kenya and Tanzania, through Malawi, Zimbabwe and Zambia, to Mozambique, Eswatini and KwaZulu-Natal in South Africa. Generally a tree of riverside forests, it also grows in sandy areas with a high water table, at altitudes of up to about 1,100 m (3,600 ft); these include the Southern African Sand Forest.

== Uses ==
The timber of Newtonia hildebrandtii is used for building construction and for making poles and implements, and for carving. The wood burns well and makes good-quality charcoal. Products from the tree are also used in traditional medicine; an extract of the roots is used against worms, and an extract from the bark has been shown to have antimicrobial activity against a range of pathogens.

== See also ==
- List of Southern African indigenous trees
