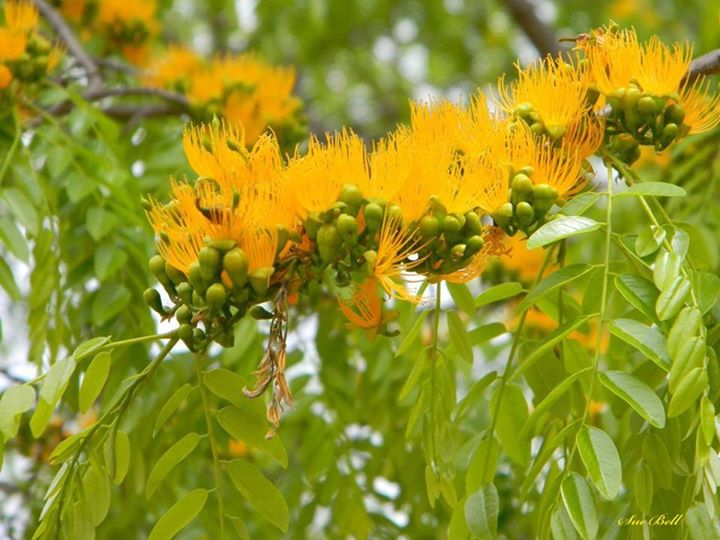

- Plate by Maureen E. Church

Conservation status
- Least Concern (IUCN 3.1)

Scientific classification
- Kingdom: Plantae
- Clade: Embryophytes
- Clade: Tracheophytes
- Clade: Spermatophytes
- Clade: Angiosperms
- Clade: Eudicots
- Clade: Rosids
- Order: Fabales
- Family: Fabaceae
- Subfamily: Faboideae
- Genus: Cordyla
- Species: C. africana

Binomial name
- Cordyla africana Lour.
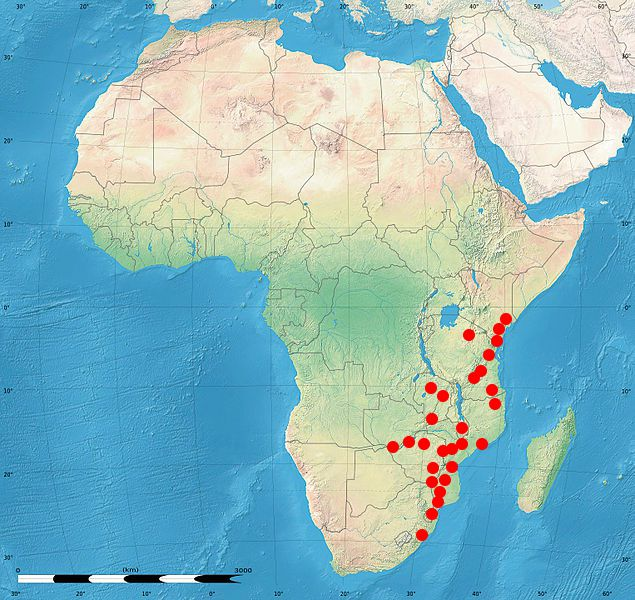

= Cordyla africana =

Species of legume

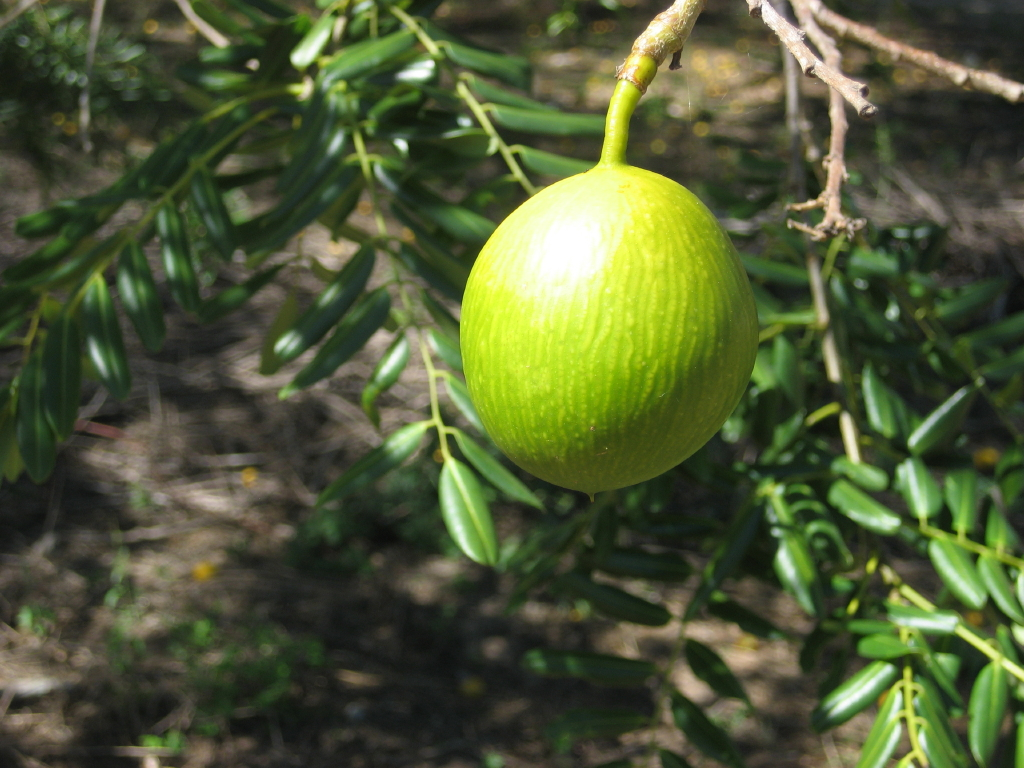

Cordyla africana is a species of flowering plant in the legume family, Fabaceae.

It is a deciduous African tree that grows up to 25 m or 82 ft, with a large, spreading, much-branched crown, and a bole of some 2.2 m (7 ft 3 in) dbh. It is sometimes referred to by the common name wild mango. It is found up to 1,000 m (3,300 ft) elevation in large river valleys, in miombo woodland and coastal swampy evergreen forest, mostly on sandy soils, along the eastern parts of central and southern Africa. It occurs in South Africa in KwaZulu-Natal and Mpumalanga provinces, the Kruger National Park, Eswatini, Mozambique, Zimbabwe, Zambia, Malawi, Kenya and Tanzania. 'Cordyla' is from the Greek word 'kordyle', meaning a 'club' and is a reference to the club-shaped fruit and stalk.

The mature bark is rough, dark brown and fissured, and a blaze showing yellow with orange streaks. The flowers are without petals and display yellow to orange stamens in axillary racemes 50 mm (2.0 in) long with up to 12 flowers, and these appear with the new leaves in September. As with Schotia flowers, they face up and are nectar-filled, attracting a wide variety of birds.

Unusually for the legume family, the fruit develops from the standard pod shape when young, into an indehiscent, up to 80 mm (3.1 in) long golden-yellow and glossy ovoid fruit with a thick stalk. When mature it has a soft, thin skin with a slight depression on one side. Fruit falls when not quite ripe, and fully ripens on the ground. One to eight large brown seeds are enclosed in a yellow, sticky pulp, and these frequently germinate from within the fruit. The fruit is rich in vitamin C and is sought after by many mammals, including elephants (see Mfuwe Lodge). The leaflets show transparent gland dots and streaks when backlit. The twigs and green fruit exude latex when damaged.

The tree was first described from Portuguese East Africa by the Jesuit priest João de Loureiro (1710–1791), who spent time as a missionary in Goa, Macao and Cochin China, but was also a naturalist and mathematician. There are eight species of Cordyla currently recognised, confined to the eastern parts of Africa and the island of Madagascar.
