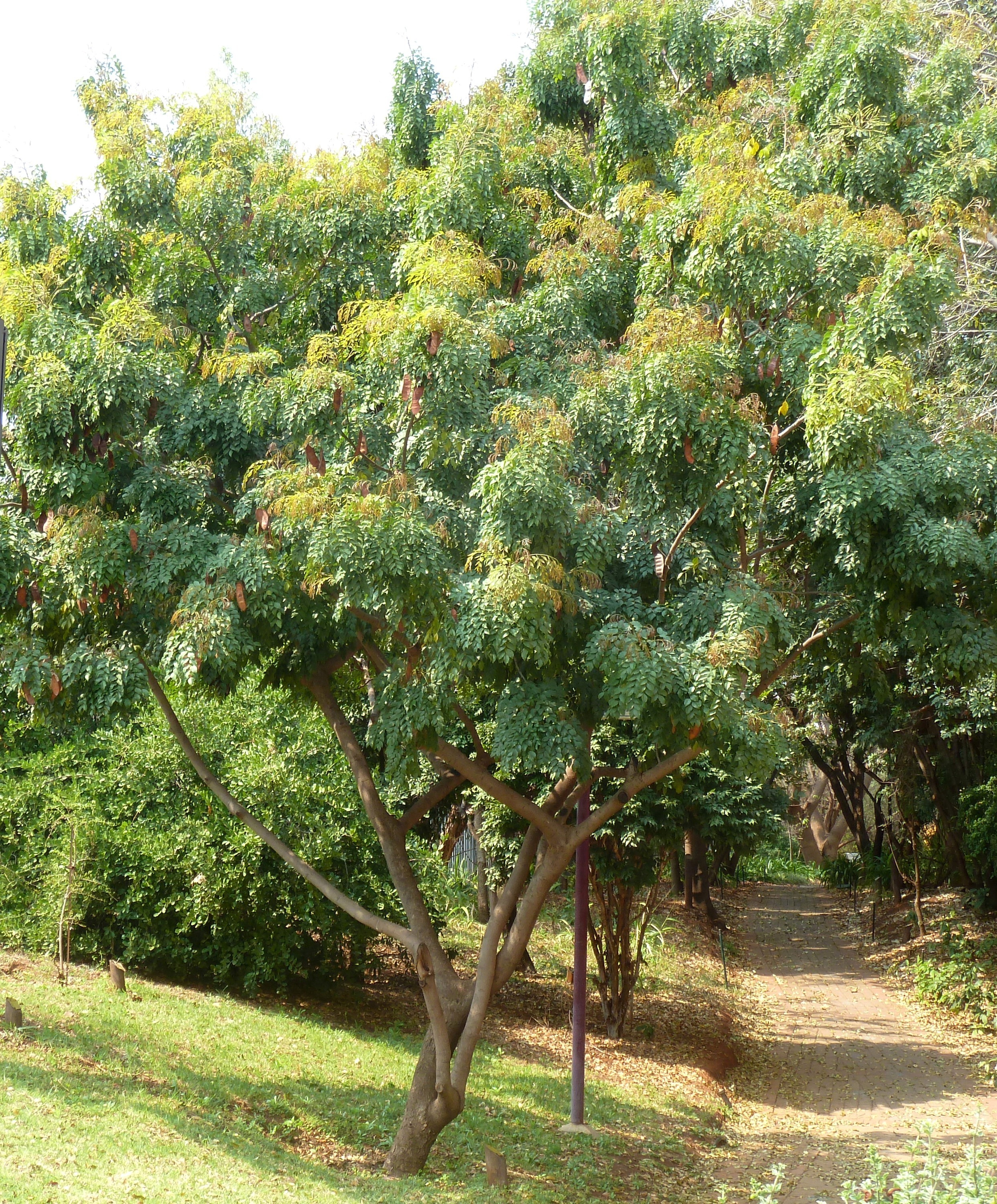

Conservation status
- Near Threatened (IUCN 3.1)

Scientific classification
- Kingdom: Plantae
- Clade: Tracheophytes
- Clade: Angiosperms
- Clade: Eudicots
- Clade: Rosids
- Order: Fabales
- Family: Fabaceae
- Subfamily: Caesalpinioideae
- Genus: Erythrophleum
- Species: E. lasianthum

Binomial name
- Erythrophleum lasianthum Corbishley

= Erythrophleum lasianthum =

Species of legume

Erythrophleum lasianthum, the Maputaland ordeal tree, is a tree with a localized range in the endangered lowland forests of southeastern Africa.

== Distribution ==
It is found from False Bay to Maputaland in northern KwaZulu-Natal province of South Africa, adjacent southern Mozambique and in eastern Eswatini.

== Gallery ==
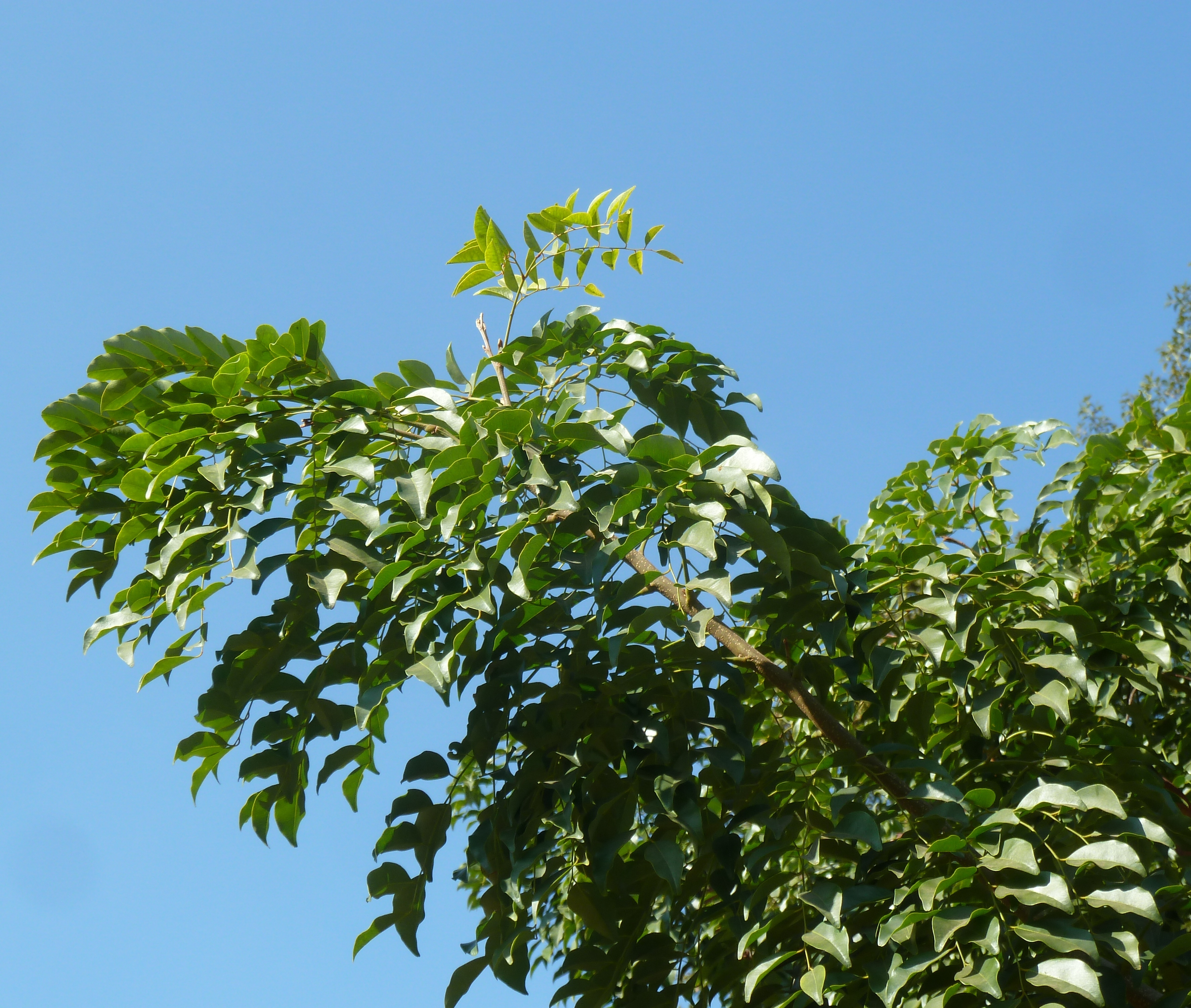
foliage

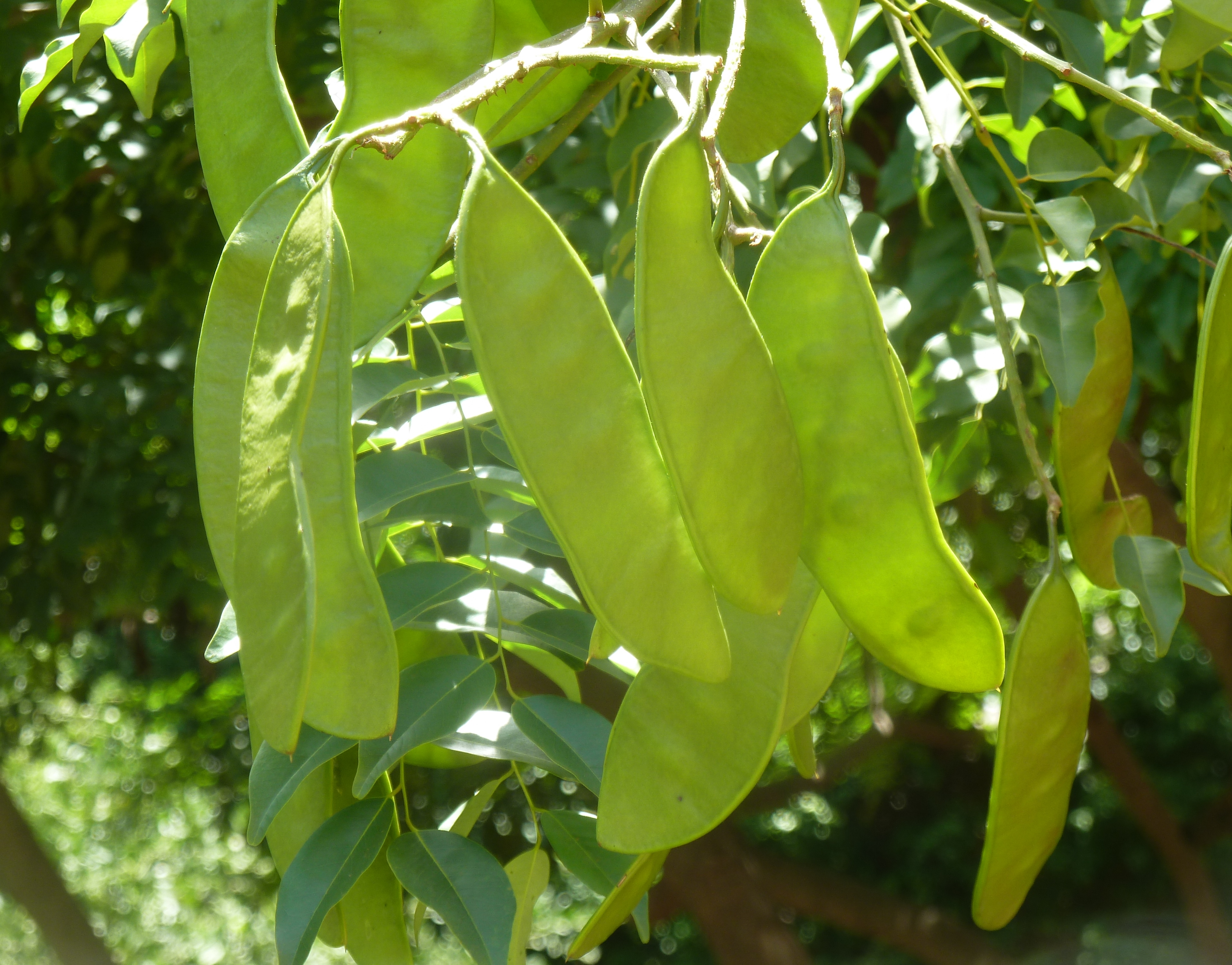
green seed pods

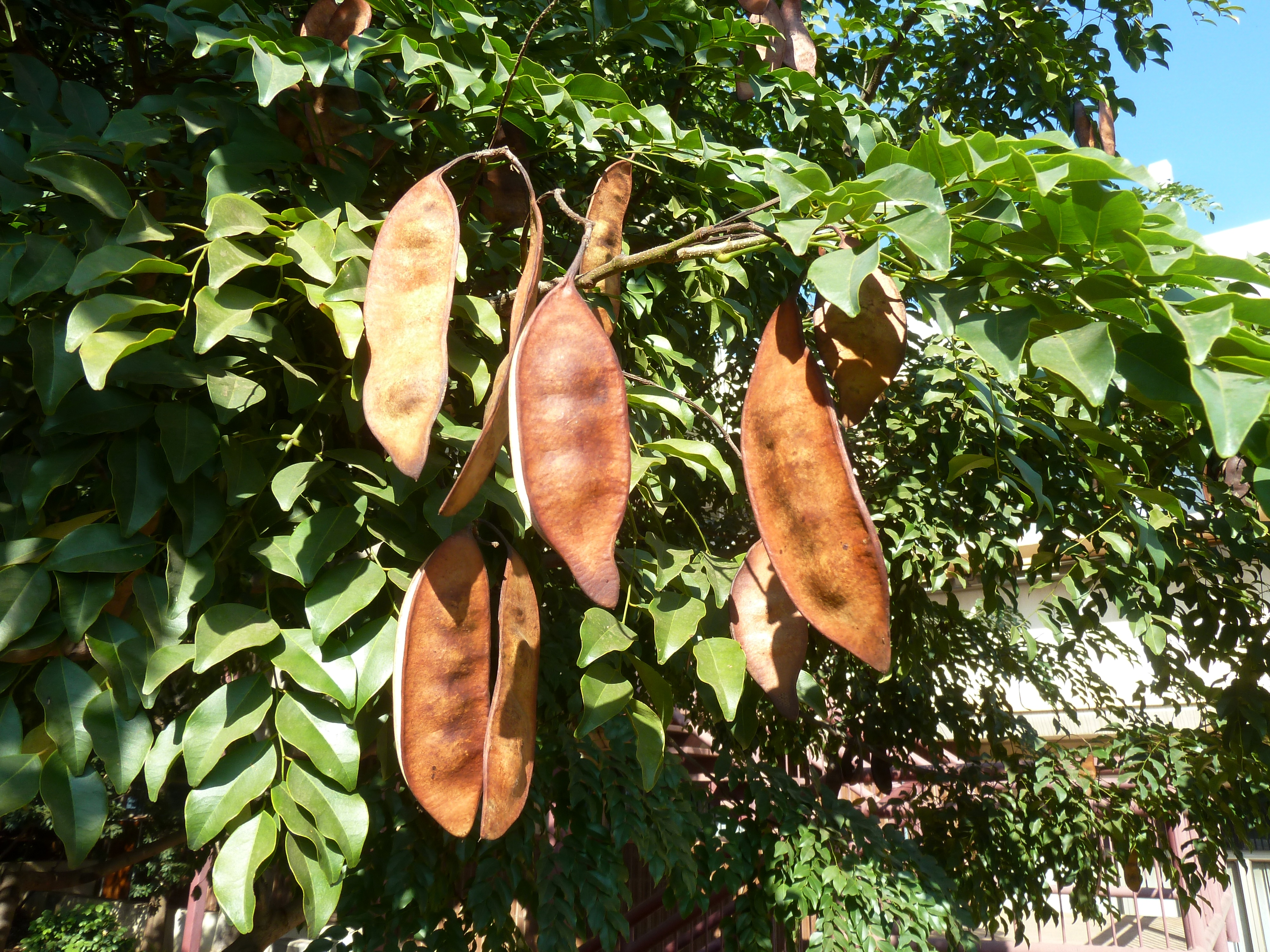
splitting seed pods

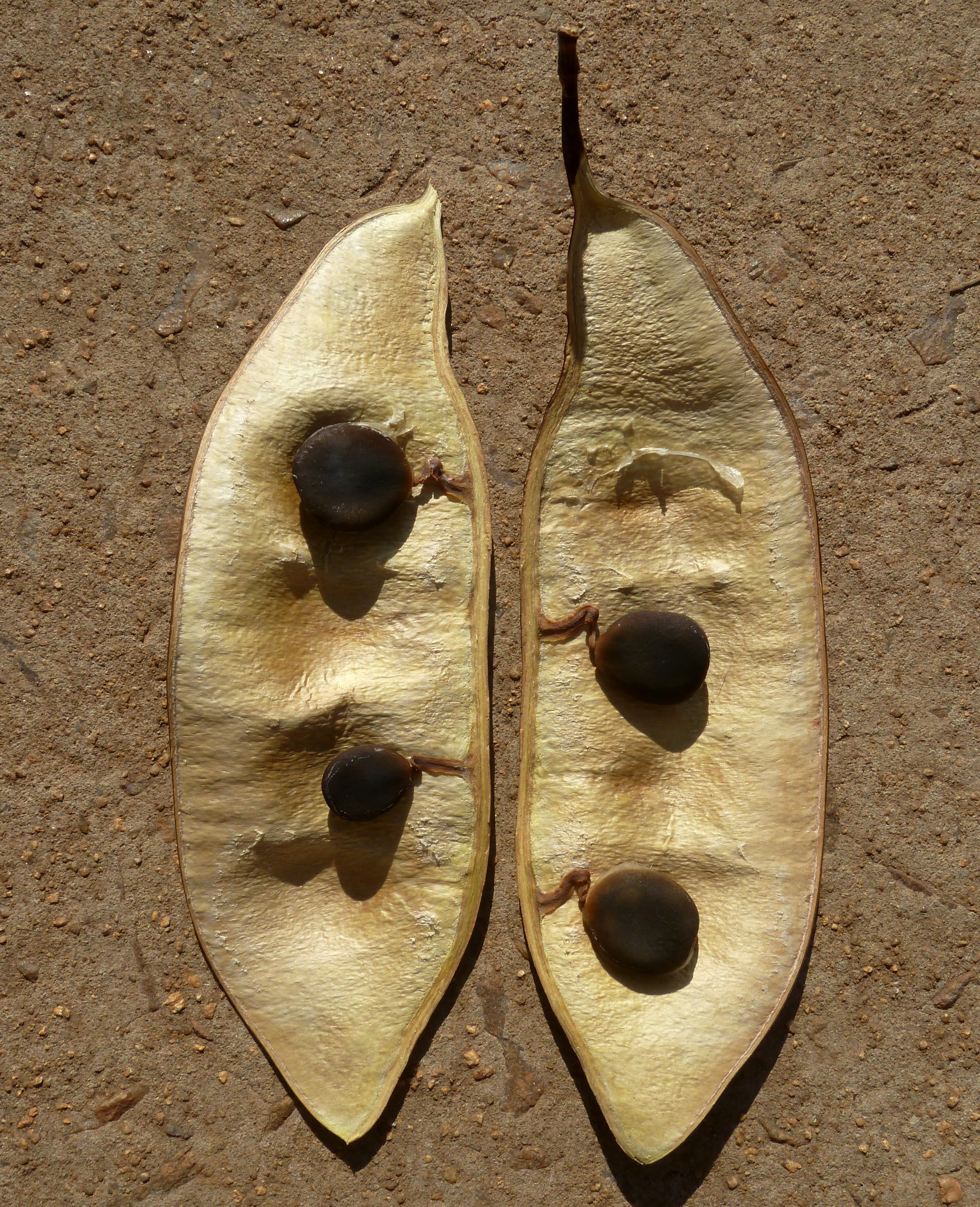
open seed pod
