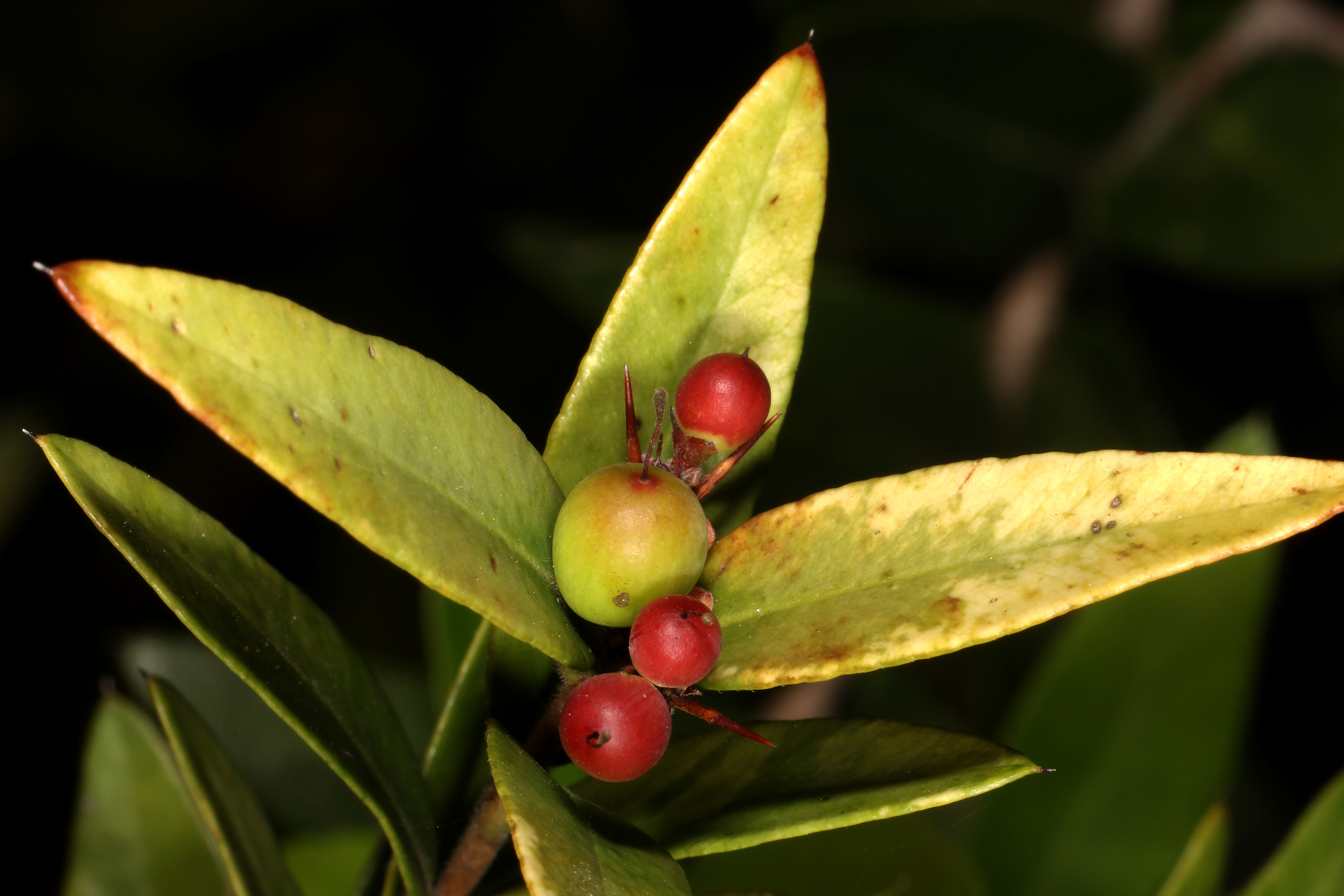
- At Durban Botanic Gardens, South Africa

Scientific classification
- Kingdom: Plantae
- Clade: Tracheophytes
- Clade: Angiosperms
- Clade: Eudicots
- Clade: Asterids
- Order: Gentianales
- Family: Apocynaceae
- Genus: Carissa
- Species: C. tetramera

Binomial name
- Carissa tetramera (Sacleux) Stapf

Synonyms
- Arduina tetramera Sacleux

= Carissa tetramera =

Species of plant

Carissa tetramera, the sand num-num, is a plant in the dogbane family Apocynaceae. The specific epithet tetramera means 'four parts', referring to the flower.

== Description ==
Carissa tetramera grows as a shrub up to 3 metres (10 ft) tall. Its strong-scented flowers feature a white corolla, often tinged pink. The fruit is red to purple-black when ripe.

== Distribution and habitat ==
Carissa tetramera is native to Kenya, Tanzania, Zimbabwe, Mozambique, Eswatini and South Africa (KwaZulu-Natal and Northern Provinces). Its habitat is dry open woodland.
