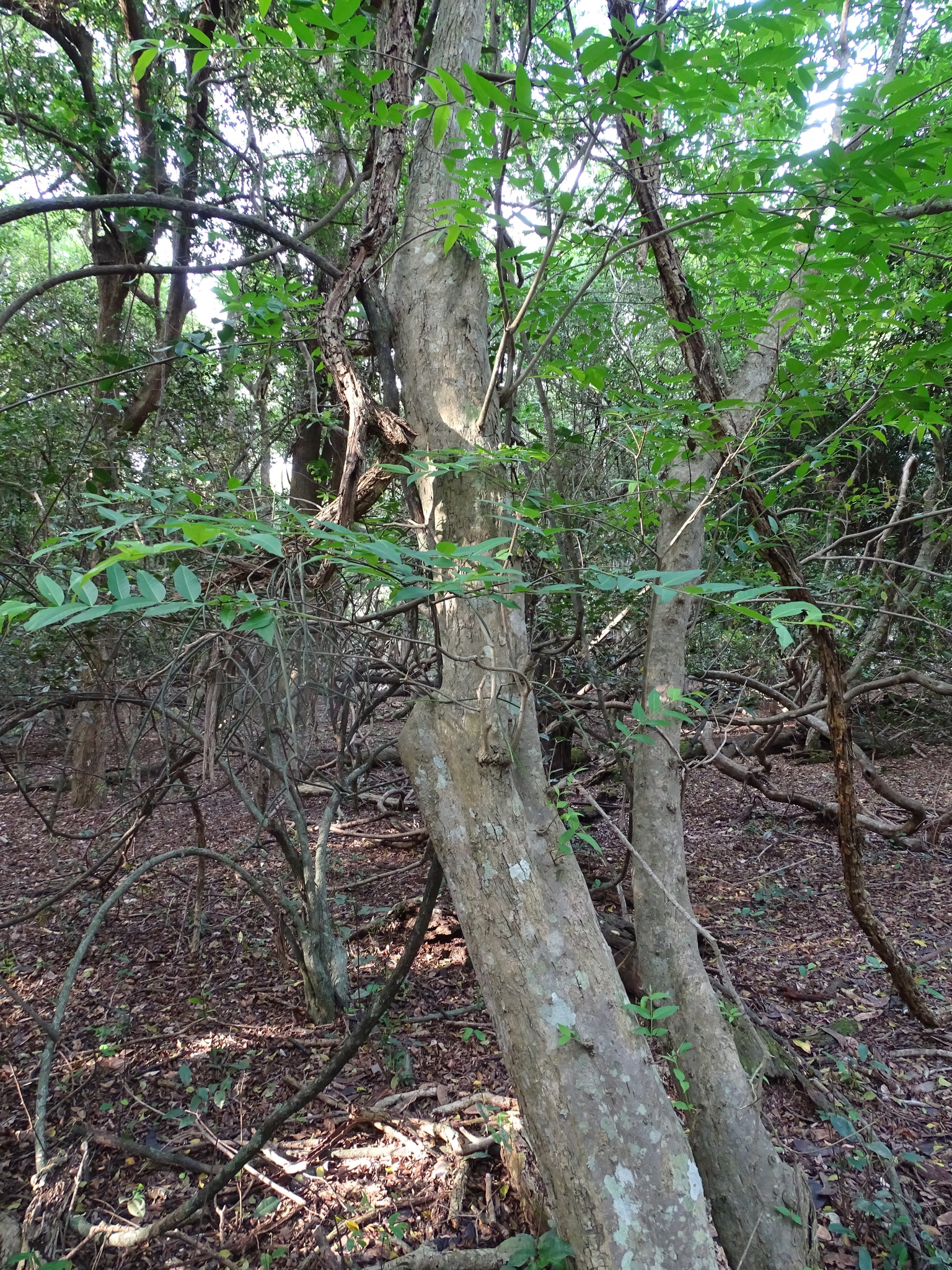
- In South Africa

Conservation status
- Least Concern (IUCN 3.1)

Scientific classification
- Kingdom: Plantae
- Clade: Embryophytes
- Clade: Tracheophytes
- Clade: Spermatophytes
- Clade: Angiosperms
- Clade: Eudicots
- Clade: Asterids
- Order: Gentianales
- Family: Apocynaceae
- Genus: Wrightia
- Species: W. natalensis

Binomial name
- Wrightia natalensis Stapf

= Wrightia natalensis =

Species of plant

Wrightia natalensis is a plant in the family Apocynaceae. It grows as a small to medium-sized deciduous tree. Its fragrant flowers feature a creamy yellow corolla. The fruit is dark green and carried in pods up to 32 cm (13 in) in length. Its habitat is dry woodland and scrub forest from sea level to 1,000 m (3,300 ft) altitude. Wrightia natalensis is native to Zimbabwe, Mozambique, Eswatini and South Africa (KwaZulu-Natal, Limpopo, Mpumalanga).
