= Eastern Shores (iSimangaliso Wetland Park) =

Coastal section of iSimangaliso Wetland Park, South Africa

- IUCN category II (national park)
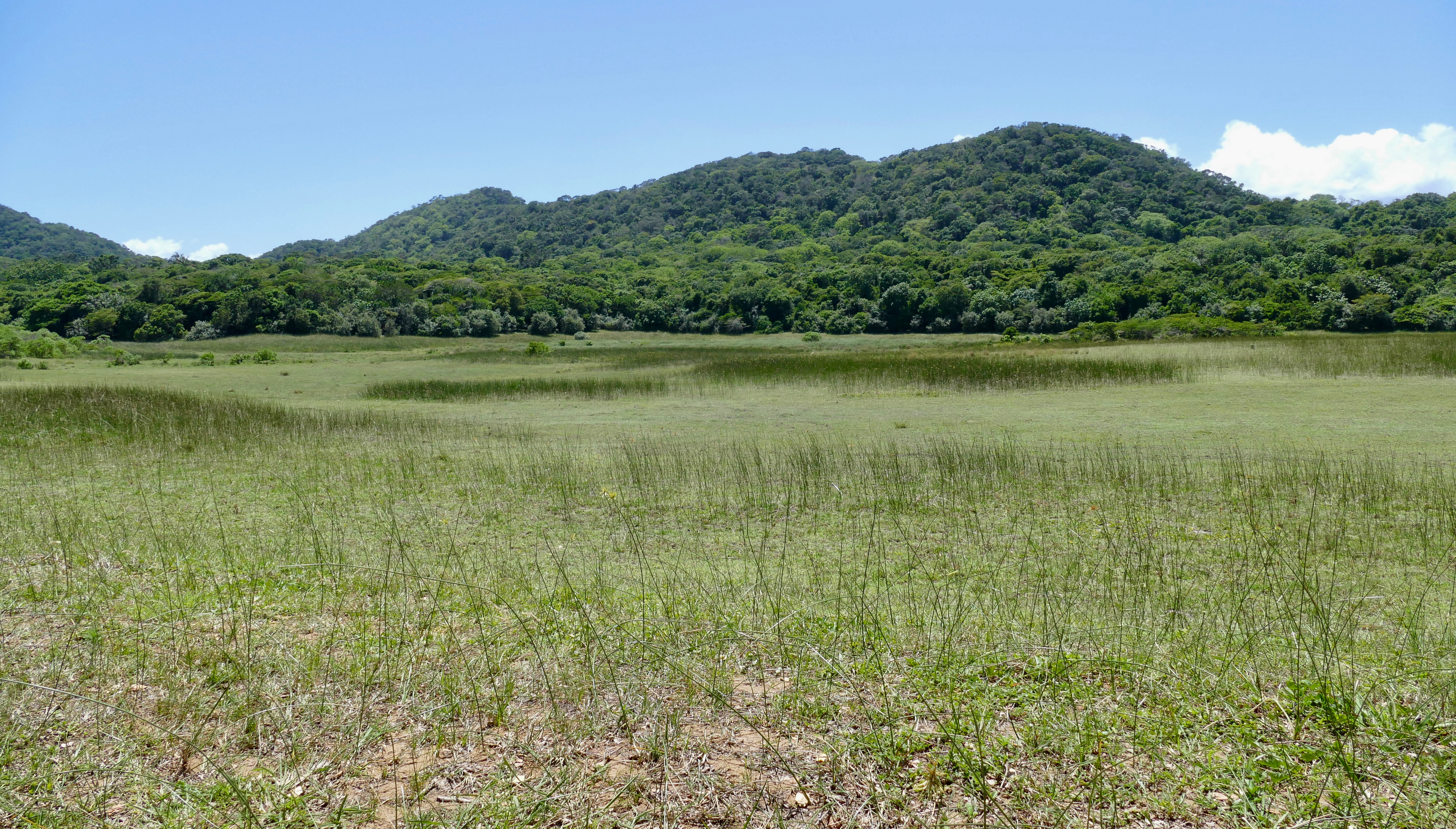
- The forested coastal dune barrier on Eastern Shores, iSimangaliso Wetland Park, rising above rehabilitated grassland formerly under pine plantation.

- Location within South Africa
- Location: KwaZulu-Natal, South Africa
- Nearest city: St Lucia
- Coordinates: 28°18′S 32°30′E
- Established: 1895 (as part of St Lucia Game Reserve)
- Governing body: iSimangaliso Authority
- Operator: Ezemvelo KZN Wildlife
- World Heritage site: iSimangaliso Wetland Park
- Website: isimangaliso.com

The Eastern Shores is a section of the iSimangaliso Wetland Park in northern KwaZulu-Natal, South Africa, comprising the coastal strip between Lake St Lucia and the Indian Ocean. The area contains some of the world's highest vegetated coastal dunes, reaching heights of 180 m (590 ft), and hosts the largest population of southern reedbuck (Redunca arundinum) in South Africa.

Eastern Shores was the focus of one of South Africa's most significant conservation campaigns when, between 1989 and 1993, a coalition of over 150 environmental organisations successfully opposed Richards Bay Minerals' application to strip-mine titanium from the dunes. The area subsequently underwent one of Africa's largest ecosystem restoration projects, with over 6,200 ha (15,000 acres) of commercial pine and eucalyptus plantations removed since 2000.

== Geography ==
=== Location and boundaries ===
Eastern Shores occupies the land barrier separating Lake St Lucia, Africa's largest estuarine lake, from the Indian Ocean. The section extends from the St Lucia Estuary mouth northward toward Lake Bhangazi and the Tewate Wilderness Area, bounded by Lake St Lucia to the west and approximately 65 km (40 mi) of Indian Ocean coastline to the east.

=== Coastal dune system ===
The defining geographic feature is the Pleistocene–Holocene coastal barrier dune complex, a forested sand formation reaching heights of 100–180 m (330–590 ft). UNESCO documentation describes these as "25,000-year-old coastal dunes—among the highest in the world". The Maphelane dune at the park's southern extent, reaching 183 m (600 ft), is often cited as Africa's highest forested sand dune.

The dune barrier extends 1–3 km (0.62–1.86 mi) in width and is densely covered by tropical dune forest vegetation. This formation has accreted on the southeast African coastal plain since the Pliocene period (5–2.5 million years ago), with Late Pleistocene Isipingo Formation aeolianite forming the upper coastal barrier core.

=== Mfabeni Peatland ===
The Mfabeni Peatland covers approximately 1,650 ha (4,100 acres) with peat deposits reaching 10.8 m (35 ft) in depth—one of South Africa's oldest and largest peatlands, dating back approximately 45,000 years. This feature constitutes one of the most important palaeoenvironmental archives in southern Africa, with pollen sequences extending over 40,000 years.

=== Key locations ===
The primary entrance is Bhangazi Gate, located 3 km (1.9 mi) north of St Lucia town after crossing the Lake St Lucia estuary bridge. A new visitor complex completed in 2023 includes visitor facilities and parking adjacent to the St Lucia Crocodile Centre.

Mission Rocks, approximately 16 km (9.9 mi) from the gate, serves as the main day visitor area. The site takes its name from a Catholic mission station established at nearby Mount Tabor in 1888, which operated until the 1950s. The location features extensive rock pools filled with marine life at low tide.

Catalina Bay, on the western Lake St Lucia shore, provides a viewing deck overlooking hippo and waterbird populations. The site's name derives from its World War II history as a flying boat base.

Cape Vidal, 35 km (22 mi) from Bhangazi Gate at the section's northern extent, provides beach access and accommodation facilities.

== Ecology ==
=== Vegetation ===
Eastern Shores lies at the southernmost end of the Maputaland Centre of Endemism, where the warm Agulhas Current enables tropical species to exist at relatively high southern latitudes. The park supports approximately 2,500 species of vascular plants, with at least 203 species and infraspecific taxa endemic or near-endemic to the region.

The coastal dune forest runs parallel to the shoreline in a band 1–3 km (0.62–1.86 mi) wide, comprising tall tropical trees with luxuriant undergrowth. Dominant species include white milkwood (Sideroxylon inerme), coast red-milkwood (Mimusops obovata), Cape ash (Ekebergia capensis), and various Ficus, Albizia, and Syzygium species. Of the 225 plant species endemic to the Maputaland Centre, 30 are associated with sand forest and 20 are restricted exclusively to this vegetation type.

Research from the University of Cape Town demonstrated that natural vegetation contains significantly higher species diversity than post-plantation sites - 220 species versus 141 - with forb species constituting 74% of total species in natural areas compared to only 51% in disturbed sites.

=== Southern reedbuck population ===
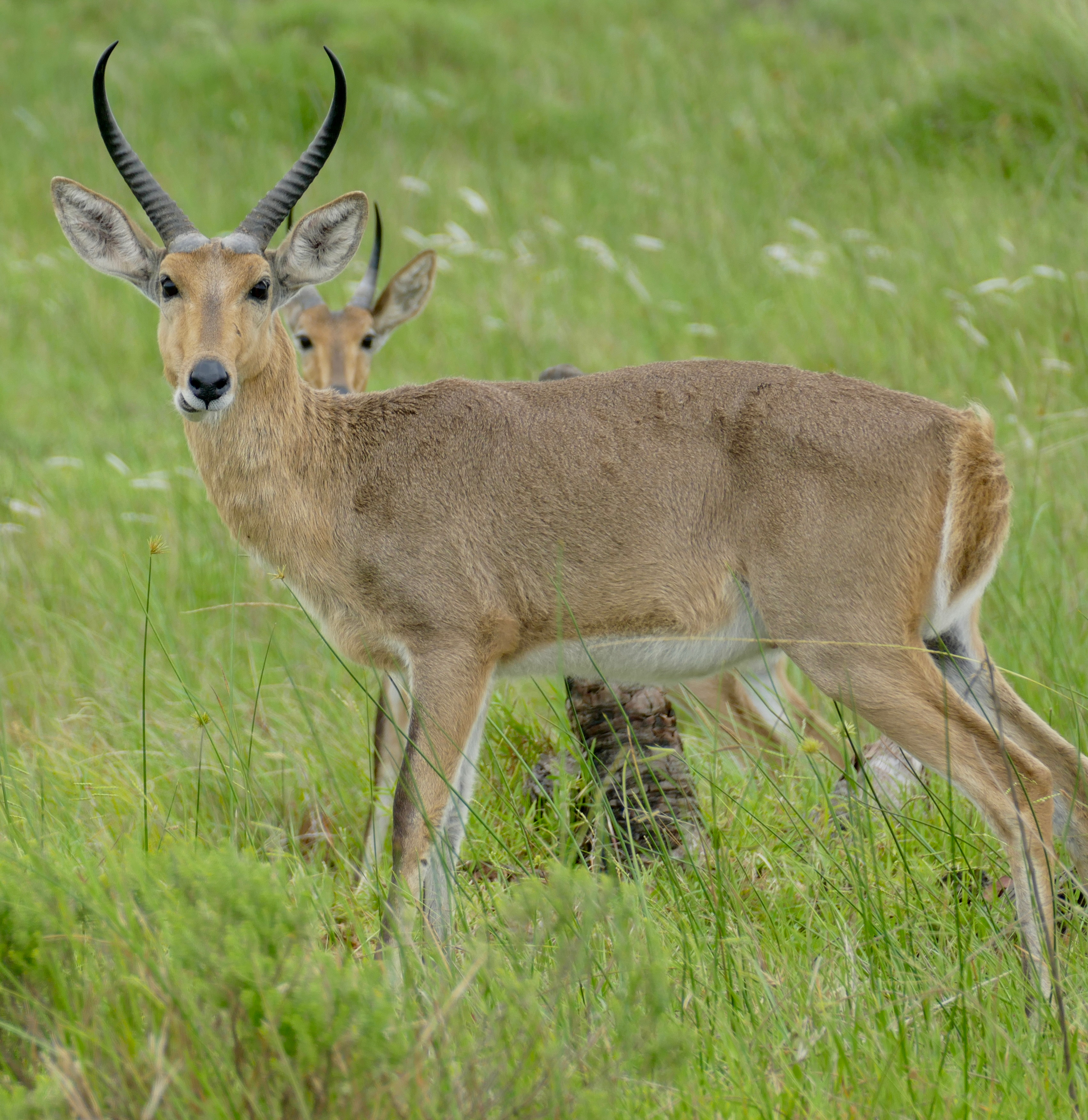
Southern Reedbuck

Eastern Shores hosts an exceptionally dense population of southern reedbuck (Redunca arundinum). According to the South African National Biodiversity Institute's Red List assessment (2016), population density reaches 35 individuals per km^{2} on Eastern Shores—compared to typical densities of 0.1–0.2 per km^{2} recorded elsewhere in Africa.

The doctoral research of J. Venter (1979), "Ecology of the Southern Reedbuck on the Eastern Shores of Lake St Lucia", conducted through the University of Natal, established foundational knowledge of this population. The SANBI assessment confirms that iSimangaliso's subpopulation of 420–840 mature individuals represents the largest single population in South Africa.

=== Mammals ===
The park supports 115 mammal species, including populations of continental significance. Following habitat restoration after plantation removal, the iSimangaliso Authority and Ezemvelo KZN Wildlife undertook systematic wildlife reintroductions:

- African elephant: Introduced 2001; population now exceeds 100 individuals
- Black rhinoceros: (Diceros bicornis minor) – Critically endangered; populations introduced through WWF Black Rhino Expansion Project
- White rhinoceros : Approximately 150 individuals
- African lion: Reintroduced December 2013 after 44 years of absence; population reached 16+ by 2016
- Cheetah: Reintroduced to uMkhuze section; 15 individuals recorded by 2016
- African wild dog: Two packs established as part of South African metapopulation management
- Hippopotamus: Approximately 800–1,200 individuals, the largest single population in South Africa

The Natal red duiker (Cephalophus natalensis natalensis), an endemic subspecies, maintains its largest South African population within iSimangaliso.

=== Birds ===
The park supports 526 bird species, making it one of Africa's most significant birding destinations. Lake St Lucia functions as the most important breeding area for waterbirds in South Africa, with at least 48 breeding waterbird species and an average of 8,800 birds present at any given time.

Three restricted-range species define the area as an Endemic Bird Area: Rudd's apalis (Apalis ruddi), Neergaard's sunbird (Cinnyris neergaardi), and pink-throated twinspot (Hypargos margaritatus). The endangered spotted ground thrush (Geokichla guttata) occurs in small numbers in coastal forest during winter months.

== History ==
=== Early conservation ===
Parts of St Lucia were proclaimed as a Game Reserve in 1895 by the Zululand government—one of Africa's oldest conservation designations—in response to severe game depletion after hunters killed over 1,000 hippopotami from 1852 onwards.

=== Second World War ===
During World War II, German U-boats operating in South African waters sank, captured, or damaged 163 Allied ships off the country's coast. In response, the Royal Air Force established a flying boat base on the eastern shore of Lake St Lucia to conduct anti-submarine patrols.

Ground crews under Flight Lieutenant S.J. Wood arrived on 1 December 1942 to construct a standard-pattern RAF seaplane base. The first Consolidated Catalina flying boats arrived on 26 February 1943, operated primarily by No. 262 Squadron RAF with detachments from No. 259 Squadron RAF.

Construction required dynamiting rocks at Mission Rocks for concrete—blast marks remain visible today. The base included a massive radar installation on Mount Tabor (the main bunker now serves as a trails base), officer facilities at Charter's Creek across the lake, and a long T-jetty for refuelling and weapons loading. Operations involved extended 20–24 hour anti-submarine patrols covering sea lanes from St Lucia to Madagascar and south to Durban. On 20 August 1943, Catalinas from St Lucia contributed to sinking U-197 south of Madagascar.

==== Catalina crashes ====
On the night of 7 June 1943, Catalina IB serial FP275 (code letter "E") of 259 Squadron RAF, piloted by Flight Lieutenant J.A.B. Kennedy, crashed while returning from an operational flight. The aircraft stalled suddenly while approaching low over reed beds and crashed into the shallows. Of the eight crew members, seven were killed; the sole survivor was Sergeant N.A. Workman.

The aircraft was salvaged for parts, then used for bombing target practice. The wreck was exposed during severe drought in 2003 when Lake St Lucia dropped to a metre below sea level. A tailplane section, retrieved in the early 1980s, is stored at Ezemvelo KZN Wildlife offices in St Lucia.

A second crash occurred on 25 June 1943 when Catalina IB FP265 (code letter "H") of 262 Squadron, piloted by Flying Officer F.N.C. White, stalled during takeoff in dead calm conditions and exploded upon impact with the lake.

Lake water levels eventually became too shallow for Catalina operations. The last Catalina departed St Lucia on 13 October 1944, with operations relocating to Richards Bay.

=== Commercial forestry era ===
In 1952, the South African Forestry Company Limited (SAFCOL) established exotic pine and eucalyptus plantations on the Eastern and Western Shores as designated "State Forests". By 1968, the state aggressively expanded plantation forestry despite recommendations against it from the Kriel Commission.

The environmental impacts proved severe. The exotic trees consumed most freshwater seepage from surrounding dunes and marshes, further drying the lake and increasing salinity. Pans, vleis, and streams went dry. Plantations were identified as early as 1966 as a dominant threat to Lake St Lucia's hydrology.

=== The Campaign to Save St Lucia ===
In 1976, Richards Bay Minerals (RBM), a subsidiary of Rio Tinto, leased three parcels of state land for potential mining. In 1989, the company applied to strip-mine titanium on 1,440 ha (3,600 acres) along the Eastern Shores. Proven reserves contained 276 million metric tonnes of mineral sands including ilmenite, rutile, and zircon.

An alliance of more than 150 conservation and environmental organisations formed the Campaign to Save St Lucia. The campaign gathered between 300,000 and 500,000 signatures—described as the largest petition ever compiled in South Africa—including those of Nelson Mandela and Mangosuthu Buthelezi.

Public pressure compelled F. W. de Klerk's government to commission a full Environmental impact assessment—the most comprehensive EIA ever undertaken in South Africa, spanning four years (1989–1993). In December 1993, a Supreme Court judge heading the review panel banned strip mining of titanium, concluding that "mining would cause unacceptable damage. The Greater St Lucia area is a very special asset for the nation." The panel urged World Heritage Site designation.

== Restoration ==
=== Plantation removal ===
Following the 1993 mining ban, attention turned to removing commercial plantations. In 1987, Eastern Shores State Forest had been transferred to the Natal Parks Board (now Ezemvelo KZN Wildlife), enabling game reintroductions to begin.

After the Greater St Lucia Wetland Park was inscribed as South Africa's first UNESCO World Heritage Site in 1999, systematic rehabilitation commenced. The programme cleared approximately 14,293 ha (35,320 acres) of pine and eucalyptus from Eastern and Western Shores combined—with 6,200 ha (15,000 acres) removed from Eastern Shores alone.

An estimated six million pine trees were felled on Eastern Shores. Plantation removal on the Eastern Shores was completed by 2006.

=== Methodology ===
The methodology involved felling all pine and eucalyptus (commercially viable or not), chemical treatment of eucalyptus stumps to prevent coppicing, burning waste material, and multiple follow-up treatments for invasive species (Chromolaena, guava, bugweed).

A ground-breaking agreement with SiyaQhubeka Forests (a partnership between Mondi, black empowerment group IL Holdings, government, and local communities) created a 158 km (98 mi) eco-track demarcating the boundary between conservation and remaining commercial forestry. This resulted in the incorporation of 14,200 ha (35,000 acres) of SiyaQhubeka land and 9,000 ha (22,000 acres) of Department of Forestry land into the park.

The programme cost approximately R10.9 million and employed 74 small businesses for environmental rehabilitation work. More than half of workers were women from adjacent communities.

=== Ecological outcomes ===
Water returned to pans, vleis, and streams within months of tree removal—freshwater flow critical for Lake St Lucia's health during high-salinity periods. However, research by Zaloumis (2008) found that passive grassland restoration has not achieved succession toward natural grassland states after 17 years.

The study documented that post-plantation sites remain more homogeneous than natural sites, with fire-adapted resprouting species failing to recolonise. The research concluded that coastal grassland restoration may be "near impossible" through passive methods alone, with active rehabilitation required for meaningful progress.

== Tourism ==
Eastern Shores provides one of the few locations in South Africa where visitors can combine game viewing with coastal beach access within a single day trip.

=== Scenic drives ===
Four main scenic loops traverse different ecosystems:

- Pan Loop – Hippo sightings almost guaranteed
- Vlei Loop – Diverse game including hippos on land during midday
- Dune Loop – Features the Kwasheleni Tower, converted from an old forestry fire-lookout
- Grassland Loop – Crosses rolling grasslands along the Nkazana Stream

A Forest Loop opened in 2016.

=== Accommodation ===
Bhangazi Bush Lodge offers the only accommodation within Eastern Shores proper—eight beds in four self-contained units on the western shore of Lake Bhangazi.

=== Walking trails ===
The Mziki Trail provides a guided multi-day walking experience (approximately 40 km (25 mi) total), requiring armed rangers due to the presence of dangerous game.

== Scientific research ==
The Cambridge University Press monograph Ecology and Conservation of Estuarine Ecosystems: Lake St Lucia as a Global Model (Perissinotto, Stretch & Taylor, 2013) synthesises over 60 years of research on the St Lucia system, covering microalgae, macrophytes, invertebrates, fish, birds, crocodiles, hippopotami, and climate change impacts.

Research on predaceous water beetles (2013–2015) recorded 68 species including the newly described Hydrobiomorpha perissinottoi (Bilton, 2016). Studies on groundwater seeps identified these features as "potentially important refugia for freshwater fishes" even during drought conditions.

The Mfabeni Peatland has yielded pollen sequences extending over 40,000 years, while integrated hydrological modelling using MODFLOW groundwater and ACRU surface water models continues to inform management decisions. The South African Environmental Observation Network (SAEON) conducts ongoing ecological monitoring throughout the park.

== See also ==
- iSimangaliso Wetland Park
- Lake St Lucia
- Western Shores (iSimangaliso Wetland Park)
- Cape Vidal
- False Bay Park
- St Lucia, KwaZulu-Natal
- No. 262 Squadron RAF
- Ezemvelo KZN Wildlife
- Maputaland-Pondoland-Albany Hotspot
