= River crab =

River crab may refer to:

- Chinese mitten crab, Eriocheir sinensis, sometimes called the Chinese River Crab
- Potamonautes perlatus, the Cape river crab of South Africa
- Potamonautes reidi, Reid's river crab
- Potamonautes sidneyi, the Natal river crab of South Africa
- Liberonautes grandbassa, Grandbassa river crab
- Liberonautes lugbe, Lugbe river crab
- Liberonautes nanoides, dwarf river crab
- Other species of freshwater crab
- River crab (Internet slang), also often referred to as the doctrine of "Harmonious society", is a euphemism for Internet censorship in the People's Republic of China and a form of protest against such censorship

== See also ==
- Hexie (disambiguation)
