= Lake St. Lucia =

Lake system in KwaZulu-Natal, South Africa

Lake St Lucia
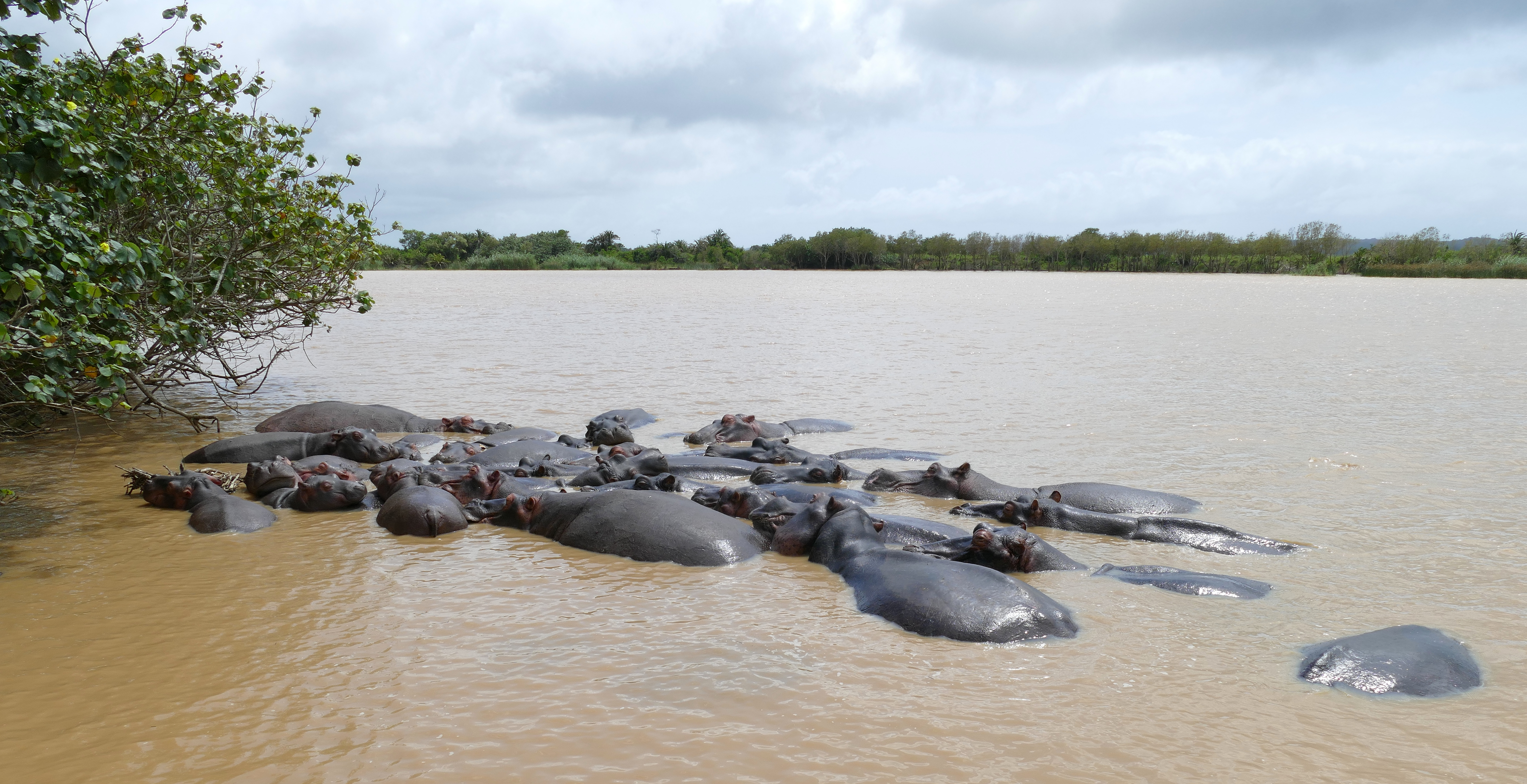
- Hippos resting on the shores of Lake St Lucia.
- Interactive map of Lake St Lucia
- Location: KwaZulu-Natal, South Africa
- Coordinates: 28°00′S 32°25′E
- Type: Estuarine lake
- Primary inflows: Mkuze River, Hluhluwe River, Nyalazi River, Mzinene River, Mpate River
- Primary outflows: St Lucia Estuary
- Catchment area: 6,150 km^{2} (2,370 sq mi)
- Basin countries: South Africa
- Managing agency: iSimangaliso Authority
- Max. length: 60 km (37 mi)
- Max. width: 1–23 km (0.62–14.29 mi)
- Surface area: 325–350 km^{2} (125–135 sq mi)
- Average depth: 0.9 m (3.0 ft)
- Max. depth: 3 m (9.8 ft)
- Surface elevation: 0 m (0 ft)
- Sections/sub-basins: South Lake, North Lake, False Bay, The Narrows
- Settlements: St Lucia

Ramsar Wetland
- Official name: St Lucia System
- Designated: 2 October 1986
- Reference no.: 345

UNESCO World Heritage Site
- Official name: iSimangaliso Wetland Park
- Designated: December 1999

Lake St Lucia (also Lake Saint Lucia) is an estuarine lake system in northern KwaZulu-Natal, South Africa. It is the largest estuarine lake in Africa and in Southern Africa, covering an area of approximately 325–350 km^{2} (125–135 sq mi) and accounting for roughly 80% of KwaZulu-Natal's total estuarine area. The lake forms the central feature of the iSimangaliso Wetland Park, South Africa's first UNESCO World Heritage Site, which was inscribed in December 1999, and it has been designated a Ramsar Wetland of International Importance since 1986.

The lake system is noted for its extreme environmental variability. Salinity levels fluctuate from near-freshwater conditions to more than 200 parts per thousand (ppt), nearly six times the salinity of seawater, making Lake St Lucia a global reference system for estuarine research. More than 60 years of peer-reviewed scientific research culminated in the 2013 Cambridge University Press monograph Ecology and Conservation of Estuarine Ecosystems: Lake St Lucia as a Global Model.

== Geography ==
=== Location and dimensions ===
Lake St Lucia is located within the iSimangaliso Wetland Park on the northeastern coast of KwaZulu-Natal, approximately 235 km (146 mi) north of Durban. The lake occupies a drowned river valley formed during the Holocene transgression, approximately 8,000–10,000 years ago, when rising post-glacial sea levels flooded incised coastal valleys.

The lake extends approximately 60–80 km (37–50 mi) in length, with widths ranging from 1 to 23 km (0.62 to 14.29 mi). Despite its large surface area, it has an average depth of only 0.9 m (3.0 ft) and a maximum depth of about 3 m (9.8 ft). This pronounced shallowness relative to its size is a key factor underlying the system's distinctive environmental hypervariability.

=== Lake basins ===
Lake St Lucia comprises three distinct sub-basins, each with differing hydrological characteristics:

- False Bay: The northernmost basin, which historically experienced the earliest isolation from marine influence and recorded the most extreme hypersaline conditions during drought periods, with salinity levels exceeding 150–200 ppt in 2003.
- North Lake: The central basin, which receives inflow from the Mkuze River via an extensive delta-swamp system. During the 2002–2007 ecological crisis, this basin underwent severe desiccation, with water covering only approximately 10% of its surface area by July 2006.
- South Lake: The southern basin, which generally maintains more stable salinity conditions and connects to The Narrows.

The Narrows is a meandering tidal channel approximately 15–22 km (9.3–13.7 mi) in length that links the lake basins to the estuary mouth.

=== Shores ===
The lake is bordered by two distinct protected areas:

- Western Shores: The drier western margin of the lake, characterised by palmveld and savanna vegetation. This 25,000 ha (62,000 acres) area was extensively rehabilitated following commercial forestry removal between 2005 and 2013, and includes Charter's Creek and Fani's Island. Western Shores receives approximately half the rainfall of the Eastern Shores due to the rain shadow effect of the coastal dunes.
- Eastern Shores: The coastal dune forest and grassland between the lake and the Indian Ocean, including Mission Rocks and providing access to Cape Vidal. The Eastern Shores features some of the highest vegetated coastal dunes in the world.

=== Hydrology ===
Five rivers feed the system from catchments lying outside the park: the Mkuze, Mzinene, Hluhluwe, Nyalazi, and Mpate. These rivers flow seasonally during summer months, contributing approximately 50% of water input under normal conditions, with direct rainfall providing the remainder.

The Mfolozi River, historically the system's single largest freshwater source providing up to 60% of freshwater input, was artificially separated from St Lucia in 1952, a management decision with profound ecological consequences.

==== Salinity dynamics ====
Lake St Lucia exhibits what researchers term a "reverse salinity gradient" during drought conditions—a phenomenon extensively documented by Forbes & Cyrus (1993). Under normal estuarine conditions, salinity decreases from the ocean-connected mouth toward freshwater inputs in the north. However, during prolonged droughts with mouth closure, the pattern inverts: highest salinities develop in the shallow northern lakes where evaporative concentration is most intense, while lowest salinities persist near The Narrows and the estuary area.

This creates extraordinary salinity variability ranging from oligohaline conditions below 5 ppt to extreme hypersaline states exceeding 200 ppt, the highest ever recorded in late 2003 in False Bay. The system alternates between four ecological states: fresh, estuarine, marine (approximately 35 ppt), and hypersaline, with the marine-estuarine state dominant when the mouth functions normally.

== History ==
=== Etymology ===
Portuguese maritime explorer Manuel de Mesquita Perestrelo named the lake system "Santa Lucia" on 13 December 1575, Saint Lucy's Day, while charting the Southern African coastline. Earlier Portuguese survivors of the São Bento wreck (1554) had referred to the broader area as "Rio dos Medos do Ouro" (River of the Gold Dunes).

=== Pre-colonial occupation ===
The Tsonga people have inhabited this region for over 1,000 years, with archaeological evidence pointing to continuous occupation since at least the 13th century. Reverend Henri-Alexandre Junod's ethnographic studies from the 1890s documented the Tsonga Tembe people's occupation, noting that the Tembe capital city was located in St Lucia Bay. Traditional fishing practices, including the 700-year-old fish kraal tradition that persists at nearby Kosi Bay, reflect deep cultural connections to these waters.

=== Conservation history ===
Following severe wildlife depletion by ivory hunters — Robert Briggs Struthers alone shot over 1,000 hippos in the region during the 1850s — parts of St Lucia were proclaimed a Game Reserve in 1895, making it one of Africa's oldest protected areas and the world's oldest formally protected estuary.

The St Lucia Park was proclaimed in 1939, expanding protection. International recognition followed with Ramsar designation on 2 October 1986 (site number 345) and UNESCO World Heritage Site inscription in December 1999, with Nelson Mandela attending the unveiling ceremony. The park was renamed iSimangaliso Wetland Park in November 2007—"iSimangaliso" meaning "miracle" or "something wondrous" in Zulu.

=== Second World War ===
During World War II, Lake St Lucia served as a strategic military base. No. 262 Squadron RAF established a Catalina flying boat station at what is now Catalina Bay in late 1942, conducting anti-submarine patrols over the Indian Ocean from February 1943. A massive radar installation on Mount Tabor and night-landing facilities using flare-paths marked by boats with lanterns supported operations. Charter's Creek on the Western Shores served as the marker point for the flare-path system.

On 7 June 1943, Catalina E FP275 crashed during final approach, with wreckage discovered during the severe 2003 drought. Operations relocated to Richards Bay in October 1944 due to declining lake levels.

=== The 1952 Mfolozi separation ===
The most consequential anthropogenic intervention occurred in 1952, when the Mfolozi River was artificially separated from the St Lucia system. Sugar cane farming on the Mfolozi floodplain, established from 1911, had destroyed the natural Phragmites–Papyrus swamp's capacity to filter river-borne sediment. Warner's Drain, completed in 1936, accelerated this process.

When the shared St Lucia–Mfolozi mouth closed in 1951 due to drought and sediment accumulation, engineers dug a new separate Mfolozi outlet near Maphelane, permanently divorcing the two systems. This decision deprived St Lucia of its single largest freshwater source, up to 60% of freshwater input, while water abstractions from remaining catchments reduced inflows by approximately 20%.

== Ecology ==
=== Flora ===
More than 2,180 species of flowering plants have been documented in the St Lucia lake system. Aquatic vegetation historically included the submerged eelgrass Zostera capensis and Ruppia species, though Zostera became locally extinct after 2005, the first documented extinction of this species from a South African estuary.

Six mangrove species are recorded in the system: white mangrove (Avicennia marina), black mangrove (Bruguiera gymnorrhiza), red mangrove (Rhizophora mucronata), and three additional species. The white, black and red mangroves are commonly found along the St Lucia Estuary.

=== Fauna ===
==== Fish ====
Ichthyological surveys have recorded 155 fish species, with 71 species using the lake as a nursery area, making St Lucia the most important estuarine nursery ground for juvenile marine fish and prawns along South Africa's east coast. At least 24 fish species important to KwaZulu-Natal's marine line fisheries depend on this system during critical life stages.

Bull sharks (Carcharhinus leucas) use the estuary as nursery habitat, creating an unusual ecosystem where hippopotami, crocodiles, and sharks coexist. A first observation of crocodile predation on neonate bull sharks was documented by Whitfield et al. (2021).

==== Birds ====
Avian diversity is remarkable, with more than 500 bird species recorded, representing approximately 60% of South African birds. The lake hosts the only breeding colony of Great white pelicans (Pelecanus onocrotalus) in southeastern Africa at False Bay, supporting 5,000–6,000 individuals during winter breeding.

Greater and lesser flamingo aggregations reach 20,000–50,000 birds during hypersaline conditions when abundant phytoplankton and invertebrate food develop. More than 50% of all waterbirds in KwaZulu-Natal feed, roost, and nest in the St Lucia system.

==== Mammals ====
Large fauna include an estimated 800–1,000 hippopotamuses and approximately 1,200 adult Nile crocodiles, which represent one of the country's most significant breeding populations.

==== Invertebrates ====
Research has documented 24 species of bivalve molluscs in the system. A comprehensive gastropod survey identified 54 species, including 25 freshwater, 15 marine/estuarine, and 14 terrestrial species.

The invasive freshwater gastropod Tarebia granifera, first recorded in South Africa in 1999 and reaching St Lucia by 2005, poses significant ecological concern. Research documented densities exceeding 5,000 individuals per square metre.

The freshwater crab Potamonautes isimangaliso was described as new to science in 2015.

== Environmental challenges ==
=== The 2002–2012 drought crisis ===
The consequences of hydrological manipulation became starkly apparent during the 2002–2012 drought. The estuary mouth closed in June 2002 and remained closed for 4 years and 9 months, which was the longest closure on record until Cyclone Gamede's storm surge combined with equinox high tides forced a breach in March 2007.

By July 2006, water covered only approximately 10% of the lake's surface area, and over 2 million tonnes of salt accumulated in sediments. Salinities reached unprecedented levels: False Bay reached 200 ppt in late 2003—nearly six times seawater concentration.

Biological impacts were catastrophic. Above 70 ppt, less than 40% of marine fish migrants survived; above 100 ppt, only Oreochromis mossambicus persisted. Above 140 ppt, eukaryotic organisms were eliminated from plankton and benthos, leaving only prokaryotes.

The submerged eelgrass Zostera capensis became locally extinct after 2005, the first documented extinction of this species from a South African estuary. Previous mouth closures (1959–1961, 1992–1993) never persisted long enough to cause complete Zostera loss.

=== Cyanobacterial bloom ===
An extraordinary Cyanothece bloom persisted for approximately 18 months from June 2009 to January 2011 and was one of the longest cyanobacterial blooms on record. Extreme hypersalinity (exceeding 150–200 ppt) and water temperatures up to 55 °C eliminated grazing organisms, allowing the prokaryote to proliferate unchecked until heavy rains in January 2011 crashed both salinity and the bloom.

== Conservation and restoration ==
=== Forestry removal ===
Approximately 23,000 hectares of commercial forestry plantations, mostly pine and eucalyptus established from the 1950s, have been removed from the Eastern and Western Shores since the early 1990s. Results were dramatic: pans dry for over 20 years began filling within weeks of tree removal. During the 2008–2012 drought, with 80% of the uMphathe River catchment plantation-free, Lake Narrows retained freshwater while the rest of the system was hypersaline or dry.

=== Mfolozi River reconnection ===
The critical Mfolozi River reconnection advanced following Water Research Commission-funded research led by Professor Alan Whitfield. In July 2012, the St Lucia Estuary and Mfolozi River systems were formally re-joined, opening pathways for restoration. A 2014 GEF-funded study ("Analysis of Options for Lake St Lucia") recommended ending artificial breaching in favour of natural hydrological restoration.

In January 2021, heavy machinery removed beach sand to create a physical connection between ocean and lake. Legal challenges by sugar farmers were dismissed by the High Court and Supreme Court of Appeal in 2017.

== Scientific research ==
Lake St Lucia has attracted systematic scientific investigation since the late 1940s, when Professor Day conducted the first comprehensive ecological survey in 1948. This research tradition culminated in the 2013 Cambridge University Press monograph Ecology and Conservation of Estuarine Ecosystems: Lake St Lucia as a Global Model, edited by Professor Renzo Perissinotto (DST/NRF Research Chair in Shallow Water Ecosystems, Nelson Mandela University), Professor Derek D. Stretch (University of KwaZulu-Natal), and Dr. Ricky H. Taylor (Park Ecologist, iSimangaliso Wetland Park/Ezemvelo KZN Wildlife).

Professor Alan K. Whitfield (South African Institute for Aquatic Biodiversity) has conducted ecological research at St Lucia since 1975 and led the Water Research Commission project on Mfolozi relinkage.

The Biodiversity Census Programme, initiated in 2010 under Perissinotto's direction, has produced modern species inventories using morphological analysis combined with DNA barcoding. Long-term monitoring programmes continue under collaboration between Nelson Mandela University, University of KwaZulu-Natal, University of Zululand, South African Institute for Aquatic Biodiversity, and Ezemvelo KZN Wildlife.

== Tourism ==
The town of St Lucia, located at the southern end of the lake system, serves as the main gateway for visitors. Boat cruises departing from the town offer wildlife viewing opportunities including hippopotami, crocodiles, and waterbirds.

Access to the surrounding protected areas is available through several gates:

- Western Shores – via the Dukuduku or Khula gates, offering game drives, the uMthoma Aerial Boardwalk, and access to Charter's Creek
- Eastern Shores – via the main St Lucia gate, providing access to Cape Vidal, Mission Rocks, and various viewpoints overlooking the lake

== See also ==
- iSimangaliso Wetland Park
- Western Shores (iSimangaliso Wetland Park)
- Eastern Shores (iSimangaliso Wetland Park)
- Cape Vidal
- False Bay Park
- St Lucia, KwaZulu-Natal
- Mfolozi River
- Mkuze River
- Ezemvelo KZN Wildlife
- List of Ramsar wetlands of international importance
- List of World Heritage Sites in South Africa
