= Rotundopotamonautes neumanni =

Conservation status
- Least Concern (IUCN 3.1)

Scientific classification
- Kingdom: Animalia
- Phylum: Arthropoda
- Class: Malacostraca
- Order: Decapoda
- Suborder: Pleocyemata
- Infraorder: Brachyura
- Family: Potamonautidae
- Genus: Rotundopotamonautes
- Species: R. neumanni

Binomial name
- Rotundopotamonautes neumanni Hilgendorf, 1898

Species of crab

Rotundopotamonautes neumanni is a species of crustacean in the family Potamonautidae. It is endemic to Kenya. Its natural habitat is rivers.
