= Rotundopotamonautes mutandensis =

Conservation status
- Endangered (IUCN 3.1)

Scientific classification
- Kingdom: Animalia
- Phylum: Arthropoda
- Class: Malacostraca
- Order: Decapoda
- Suborder: Pleocyemata
- Infraorder: Brachyura
- Family: Potamonautidae
- Genus: Rotundopotamonautes
- Species: R. mutandensis

Binomial name
- Rotundopotamonautes mutandensis (Chace, 1953)

Synonyms
- Potamon mutandensis Chace, 1953

Species of crab

Rotundopotamonautes mutandensis is an endangered species of freshwater crab in the family Potamonautidae. It is found in Lake Mutanda and Lake Kivu in Uganda, Rwanda and DR Congo.
