= Rotundopotamonautes emini =

Conservation status
- Least Concern (IUCN 3.1)

Scientific classification
- Kingdom: Animalia
- Phylum: Arthropoda
- Class: Malacostraca
- Order: Decapoda
- Suborder: Pleocyemata
- Infraorder: Brachyura
- Family: Potamonautidae
- Genus: Rotundopotamonautes
- Species: R. emini

Binomial name
- Rotundopotamonautes emini (Hilgendorf, 1892)

Synonyms
- Telphusa emini Hilgendorf, 1892

Species of crab

Rotundopotamonautes emini is a species of crab in the family Potamonautidae. It is found in the Rwenzori Mountains between Lake Edward and Lake Albert in the Democratic Republic of the Congo, Rwanda, Tanzania, and Uganda. It is listed as Least Concern on the IUCN Red List.
