= Rotundopotamonautes berardi =

Conservation status
- Least Concern (IUCN 3.1)

Scientific classification
- Kingdom: Animalia
- Phylum: Arthropoda
- Class: Malacostraca
- Order: Decapoda
- Suborder: Pleocyemata
- Infraorder: Brachyura
- Family: Potamonautidae
- Genus: Rotundopotamonautes
- Species: R. berardi

Binomial name
- Rotundopotamonautes berardi (Audouin, 1826)

Species of crab

Rotundopotamonautes berardi is a species of freshwater crab in the family Potamonautidae. It is found in the Nile Basin in Egypt, Ethiopia, Sudan, Tanzania and Uganda. Its natural habitats are rivers and streams.
