= Rotundopotamonautes loveni =

Conservation status
- Least Concern (IUCN 3.1)

Scientific classification
- Kingdom: Animalia
- Phylum: Arthropoda
- Class: Malacostraca
- Order: Decapoda
- Suborder: Pleocyemata
- Infraorder: Brachyura
- Family: Potamonautidae
- Genus: Rotundopotamonautes
- Species: R. loveni

Binomial name
- Rotundopotamonautes loveni (Colosi, 1924)

Species of crab

Rotundopotamonautes loveni is a species of crab in the family Potamonautidae. It is found in Kenya and Uganda. Its natural habitat is rivers.
