= Arcopotamonautes loveridgei =

Conservation status
- Least Concern (IUCN 3.1)

Scientific classification
- Kingdom: Animalia
- Phylum: Arthropoda
- Class: Malacostraca
- Order: Decapoda
- Suborder: Pleocyemata
- Infraorder: Brachyura
- Family: Potamonautidae
- Genus: Arcopotamonautes
- Species: A. loveridgei

Binomial name
- Arcopotamonautes loveridgei Rathbun, 1933

Species of crab

Arcopotamonautes loveridgei is a species of crab in the family Potamonautidae. It is found in the rivers that flow into Lake Tanganyika.
