= Rukwanzi =

Rukwanzi may refer to:

- Potamonautes rukwanzi, a crustacean native to Uganda
- Rukwanzi Island, an island in Lake Albert
