= Rotundopotamonautes ignestii =

Conservation status
- Vulnerable (IUCN 3.1)

Scientific classification
- Kingdom: Animalia
- Phylum: Arthropoda
- Class: Malacostraca
- Order: Decapoda
- Suborder: Pleocyemata
- Infraorder: Brachyura
- Family: Potamonautidae
- Genus: Rotundopotamonautes
- Species: R. ignestii

Binomial name
- Rotundopotamonautes ignestii Parisi, 1923

Species of crab

Rotundopotamonautes ignestii is a species of crab in the family Potamonautidae. It is found in Ethiopia.
