= Louisea edeaensis =

Conservation status
- Critically Endangered (IUCN 2.3)

Scientific classification
- Kingdom: Animalia
- Phylum: Arthropoda
- Clade: Pancrustacea
- Class: Malacostraca
- Order: Decapoda
- Suborder: Pleocyemata
- Infraorder: Brachyura
- Family: Potamonautidae
- Genus: Louisea
- Species: L. edeaensis

Binomial name
- Louisea edeaensis (Bott, 1969)

Species of crustacean

Louisea edeaensis is a species of crustacean in the family Potamonautidae. It is endemic to Cameroon.
