= Hoplebaea valida =

Scientific classification
- Kingdom: Animalia
- Phylum: Arthropoda
- Class: Insecta
- Order: Coleoptera
- Suborder: Polyphaga
- Infraorder: Scarabaeiformia
- Family: Scarabaeidae
- Genus: Hoplebaea
- Species: H. valida

Binomial name
- Hoplebaea valida (Péringuey, 1902)

Synonyms
- Congella valida Péringuey, 1902

Species of beetle

Hoplebaea valida is a species of beetle of the family Scarabaeidae. It is found in South Africa.

== Description ==
Adults reach a length of about 11–12.5 mm (0.43–0.49 in). They are reddish brown, sometimes slightly infuscate. The head has scattered granules and the pronotum is the same as the pronotum of Hoplebaea mashunensis, but the space among the scar-like punctures is plainly wrinkled or rugose. The elytra are similarly costate, the hairs are not so dense, but longer and less squamulose, and the sculpture consists of contiguous impressed punctures having in the centre a smaller one emitting a hair. These hairs are similar on the upper and undersides and also on the legs, as well as on the pygidium. The latter is granulose and has a median longitudinal furrow.
