= Potamonautes danielsi =

Scientific classification
- Kingdom: Animalia
- Phylum: Arthropoda
- Class: Malacostraca
- Order: Decapoda
- Suborder: Pleocyemata
- Infraorder: Brachyura
- Family: Potamonautidae
- Genus: Potamonautes
- Species: P. danielsi

Binomial name
- Potamonautes danielsi Peer & Gouws, 2017

Species of crab

Potamonautes danielsi is a species of crustacean found mainly around fresh water.
