= Arcopotamonautes suprasulcata =

Conservation status
- Least Concern (IUCN 3.1)

Scientific classification
- Kingdom: Animalia
- Phylum: Arthropoda
- Class: Malacostraca
- Order: Decapoda
- Suborder: Pleocyemata
- Infraorder: Brachyura
- Family: Potamonautidae
- Genus: Arcopotamonautes
- Species: A. suprasulcata

Binomial name
- Arcopotamonautes suprasulcata (Hilgendorf, 1898)

Species of crab

Arcopotamonautes suprasulcata is a species of crab in the family Potamonautidae. It is found in the wetlands of Malawi, Tanzania, and Zambia.
