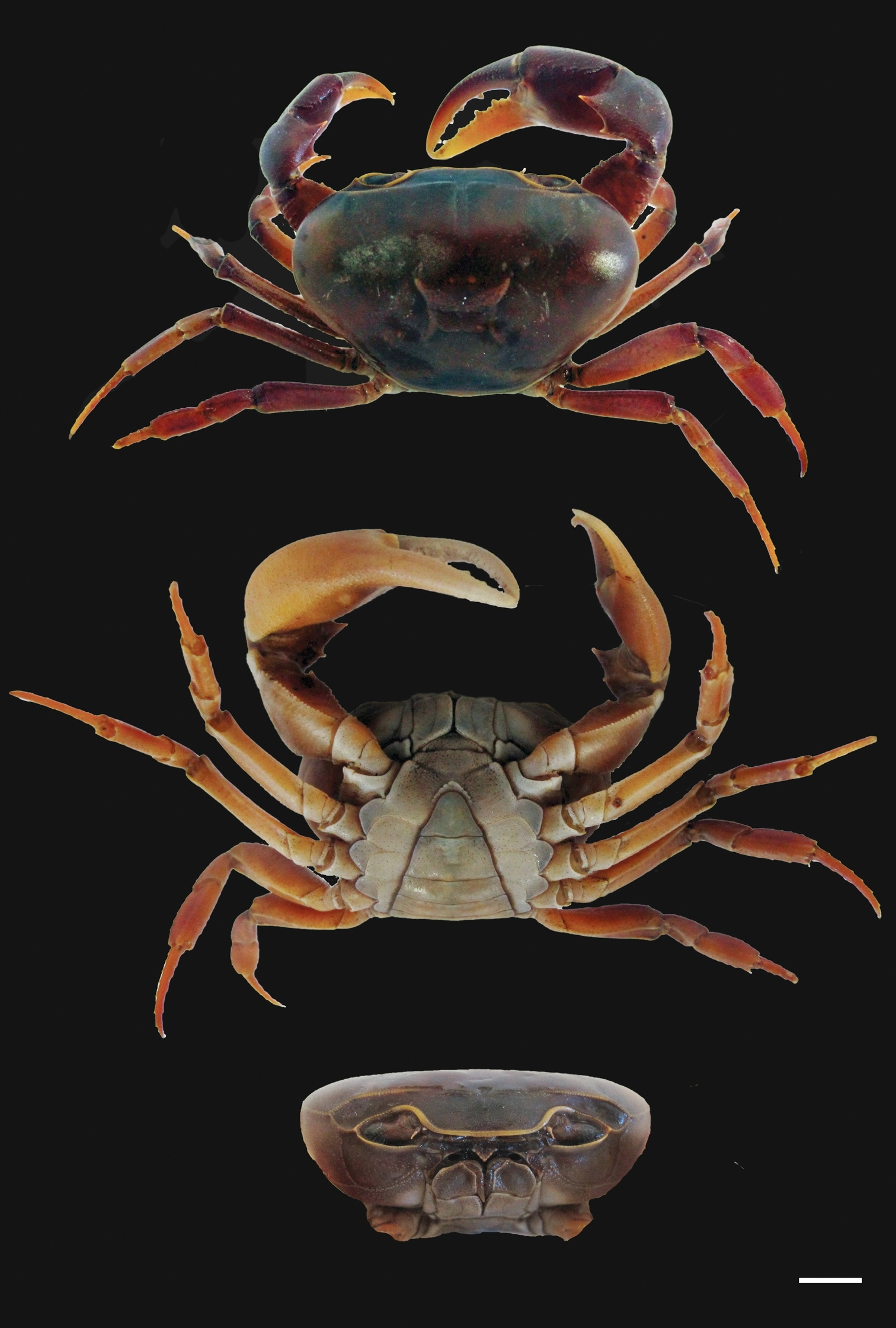

Scientific classification
- Domain: Eukaryota
- Kingdom: Animalia
- Phylum: Arthropoda
- Class: Malacostraca
- Order: Decapoda
- Suborder: Pleocyemata
- Infraorder: Brachyura
- Family: Potamonautidae
- Genus: Potamonautes
- Species: P. isimangaliso

Binomial name
- Potamonautes isimangaliso Peer & Gouws, 2015

= Potamonautes isimangaliso =

False bay crab

Species of crab

Potamonautes isimangaliso is a species of freshwater crab in the family Potamonautidae. It is endemic to iSimangaliso Wetland Park, South Africa. Its natural habitat are the ephemeral wetlands fringing the western shores of False Bay. Molecular DNA analyses were required to distinguish it from the similar and rather variable P. lividus, which occurs further inland.

== Description ==
It most closely resembles P. lividus but its mtDNA differs from the former by between 7.4 and 7.8%. It is further distinguished by its unique suite of carapace characters, besides its colouration and size.

== Habitat ==
It occurs in oxygen-poor, fresh ephemeral pans.
