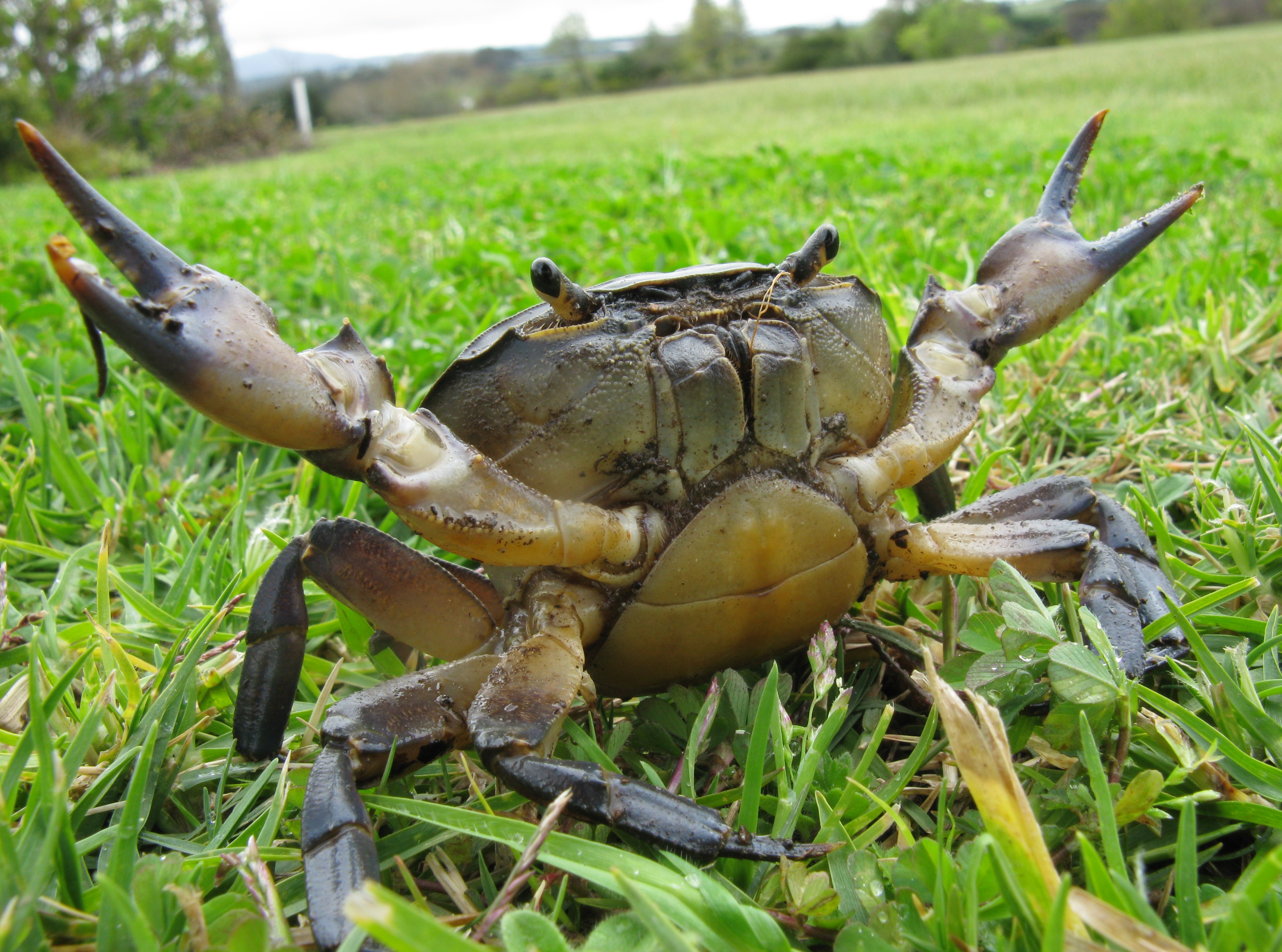

Conservation status
- Least Concern (IUCN 3.1)

Scientific classification
- Kingdom: Animalia
- Phylum: Arthropoda
- Class: Malacostraca
- Order: Decapoda
- Suborder: Pleocyemata
- Infraorder: Brachyura
- Family: Potamonautidae
- Genus: Potamonautes
- Species: P. perlatus

Binomial name
- Potamonautes perlatus H. Milne-Edwards, 1837

= Potamonautes perlatus =

Species of crab

Potamonautes perlatus, the Cape river crab, is a species of crab in the family Potamonautidae.

Potamonautes perlatus is found in South Africa, particularly in the Cape Province. There are unconfirmed reports that it occurs in parts of Namibia. Its main habitat is rivers, but it does occur widely in farm dams, where it often is regarded as a pest, with a propensity for digging tunnels in earth dams. It is doubtful that this is a serious problem in professionally engineered dams, but there may be occasional damage to small farming earthworks. Possibly because of its being primarily a river crab, when it lives in farm dams without direct connection to a stream, it has a tendency to migrate out of a dam during rainy periods, especially at night. It is not clear that losses from this habit reduce its numbers however, as its populations in stable dams seem to remain indefinitely.

Ecologically the species often is quite important, as it is a detritus shredder, a predator of small fish and amphibians, and a major prey item for large fish, otters, aquatic reptiles, and various other animals. It also is an intermediate host to various parasites.

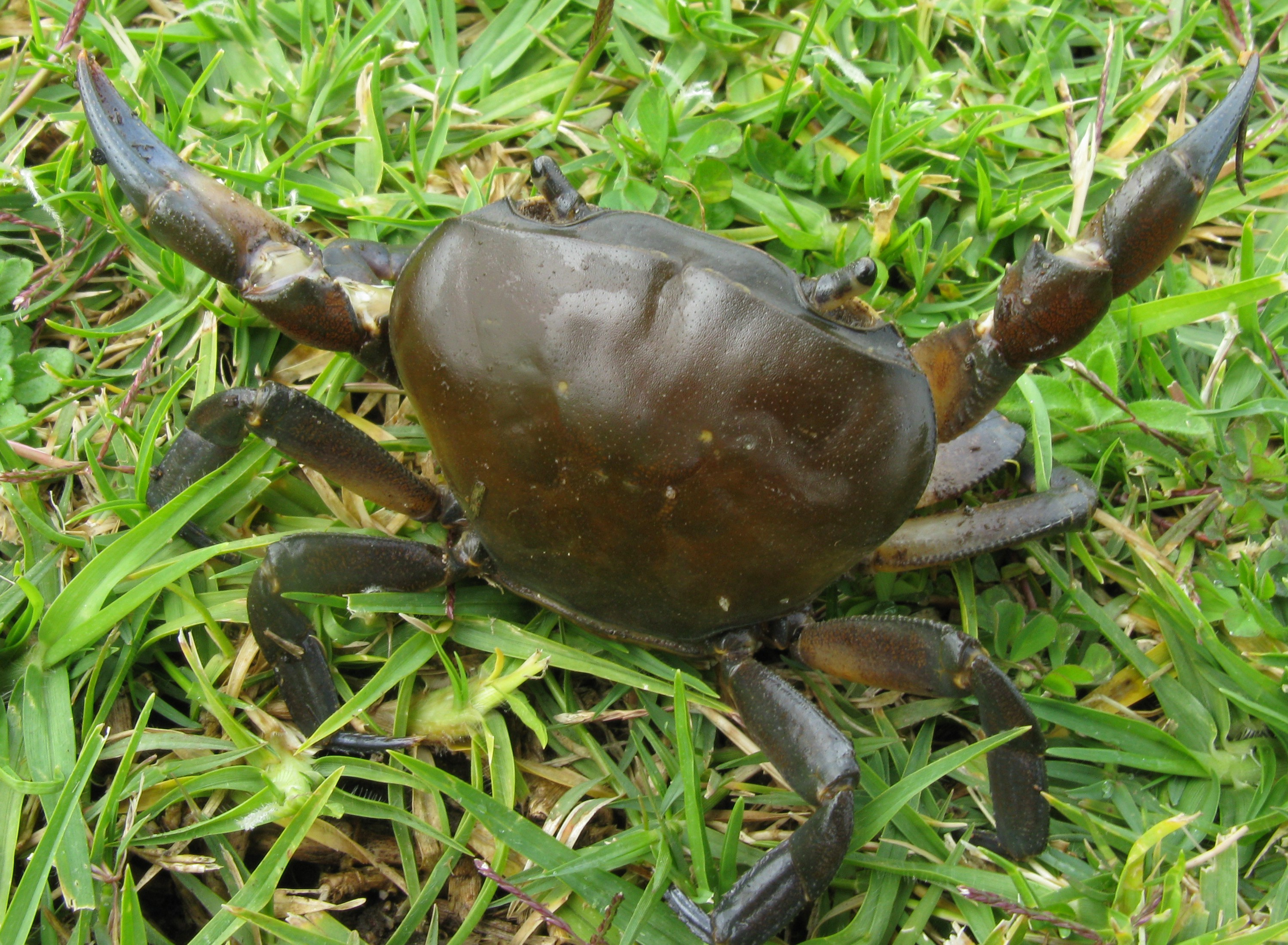
Potamonautes perlatus
