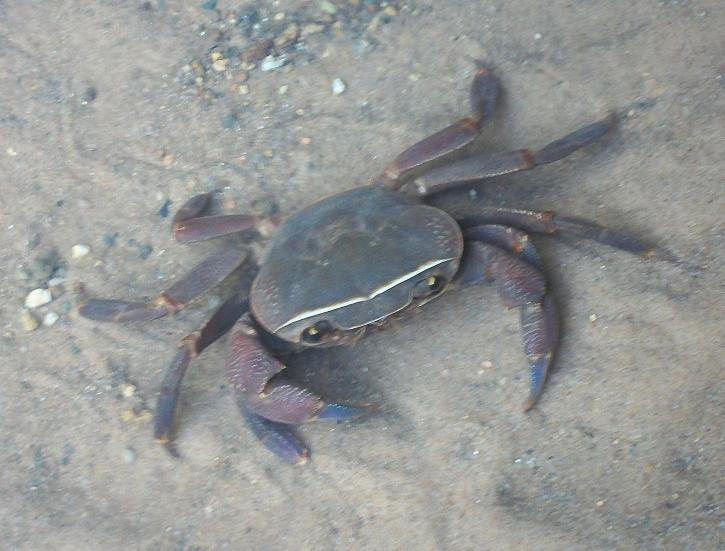
- Potamonautes sidneyi

Scientific classification
- Domain: Eukaryota
- Kingdom: Animalia
- Phylum: Arthropoda
- Class: Malacostraca
- Order: Decapoda
- Suborder: Pleocyemata
- Infraorder: Brachyura
- Family: Potamonautidae
- Subfamily: Potamonautinae
- Genus: Potamonautes; Macleay, 1838

Type species
- Thelphusa perlata H. Milne-Edwards, 1837

= Potamonautes =

Potamonautes Temporal range: Late Cretaceous–Recent

Genus of crabs

Potamonautes is a genus of African freshwater crabs in the family Potamonautidae. It is both the most widespread and most diverse genus of African freshwater crabs, including more than half the species of this continent. They are found in most freshwater habitats of the African mainland and some species are semi-terrestrial.

== Species ==
It contains the following species:

- Potamonautes adeleae Bott, 1968
- Potamonautes amathole Peer & Gouws in Peer, Gouws, Maliwa, Barker, Juby & Perissinotto, 2023
- Potamonautes anchietae (de Brito Capello, 1870)
- Potamonautes aurantius Mengel & Daniels, 2024
- Potamonautes barbarai Phiri & Daniels, 2014
- Potamonautes barnardi Phiri & Daniels, 2014
- Potamonautes bayonianus (de Brito Capello, 1864)
- Potamonautes baziya Daniels, Barnes, Marais & Gouws, 2021
- Potamonautes biballensis (Rathbun, 1905)
- Potamonautes brincki (Bott, 1960)
- Potamonautes clarus Gouws, Stewart & Coke, 2000
- Potamonautes danielsi Peer & Gouws in Peer, Gouws, Lazo-Wasem, Perissinotto & Miranda, 2017
- Potamonautes dentatus Stewart, Coke & PA Cook, 1995
- Potamonautes depressus (Krauss, 1843)
- Potamonautes dubius (de Brito Capello, 1873)
- Potamonautes flavusjo Daniels, Phiri & Bayliss, 2014
- Potamonautes gorongosa Cumberlidge, Naskrecki & Daniels, 2016
- Potamonautes granularis Daniels, Stewart & Gibbons, 1998
- Potamonautes isimangaliso Peer & Gouws in Peer, Perissinotto, Gouws & Miranda, 2015
- Potamonautes karooensis Daniels, Buschhau, Gullacksen, Marais, Gouws & Barnes, 2022
- Potamonautes kensleyi Cumberlidge & Tavares, 2006
- Potamonautes lindblomi (Colosi, 1924)
- Potamonautes lividus Gouws, Stewart & Reavell, 2001
- Potamonautes machadoi Bott, 1964
- Potamonautes macrobrachii Bott, 1953
- Potamonautes marchei (Rathbun, 1902)
- Potamonautes mariepskoppie Daniels, Barnes, Marais & Gouws, 2021
- Potamonautes mhlophe Daniels, 2017
- Potamonautes mulanjeensis Daniels & Bayliss, 2012
- Potamonautes mutareensis Phiri & Daniels, 2013
- Potamonautes ngoyensis Daniels, Busschau & Cumberlidge, 2019
- Potamonautes ntendekaensis Daniels, Busschau & Cumberlidge, 2019
- Potamonautes parvicorpus Daniels, Stewart & Burmeister, 2001
- Potamonautes parvispina Stewart, 1997
- Potamonautes perlatus (H. Milne Edwards, 1837)
- Potamonautes principe Cumberlidge, Clark & Baillie, 2002
- Potamonautes regnieri (Rathbun, 1904)
- Potamonautes sidneyi (Rathbun, 1904)
- Potamonautes tuerkayi Wood & Daniels, 2016
- †Potamonautes tugenensis Morris, 1976
- Potamonautes unispinus Stewart & PA Cook, 1998
- Potamonautes valles Daniels, Buschhau, Gullacksen, Marais, Gouws & Barnes, 2022
- Potamonautes warreni (Calman, 1918)
- Potamonautes wolkbergi Mengel & Daniels, 2024

One extant species is also known from the fossil record; P. niloticus is abundant in Miocene sediments (6 million years ago) of Lake Albert. Extinct species assigned to Potamonautes are also known from the Late Cretaceous of Niger.

== Distribution ==
Potamonautes are restricted to Sub-Saharan Africa and the Nile Basin, with more than 30 species in East Africa (none on Madagascar, the Seychelles and other offshore African islands), more than 20 in the Congo Basin region, 20 in Southern Africa, 6 in northeast Africa and 5 in West Africa. Although the genus includes common and widespread species, others have very restricted ranges of occurrence. For example, P. dubius is found only in limited parts of the Kunene River and upper Zambezi River in Southern Africa.
