= Hexie =

Hexie or He Xie may refer to:

- Harmonious Society (Chinese: 和谐社会; pinyin: héxié shèhuì), Chinese leader Hu Jintao's signature ideology
- Hexie (train) (Chinese: 和谐号, meaning "Harmony") - Chinese name of China Railway High-speed trains
- River crab (Internet slang) (Chinese: 河蟹; pinyin: héxiè)

== See also ==
- Xie He (artist), Chinese painter and art theorist in the 6th century
- Xie He (Go player), Chinese Go player
- River crab (disambiguation)
