= Hoplebaea mashunensis =

Scientific classification
- Kingdom: Animalia
- Phylum: Arthropoda
- Class: Insecta
- Order: Coleoptera
- Suborder: Polyphaga
- Infraorder: Scarabaeiformia
- Family: Scarabaeidae
- Genus: Hoplebaea
- Species: H. mashunensis

Binomial name
- Hoplebaea mashunensis (Péringuey, 1902)

Synonyms
- Congella mashunensis Péringuey, 1902

Species of beetle

Hoplebaea mashunensis is a species of beetle of the family Scarabaeidae. It is found in the Democratic Republic of the Congo and Zimbabwe.

== Description ==
Adults reach a length of about 9 mm (0.35 in). The colour, sculpture, and vestiture is the same as Hoplebaea tessellatula and the head and clypeus are also similar, but the pronotum is more angular laterally at middle and more obliquely attenuated thence towards the basal angle. The elytra are much more plainly tri-costate on each side, and the intervals are deeper, but the minute scale-like hairs are identical.
