= Louisea =

- Louisea balssi

Scientific classification
- Kingdom: Animalia
- Phylum: Arthropoda
- Clade: Pancrustacea
- Class: Malacostraca
- Order: Decapoda
- Suborder: Pleocyemata
- Infraorder: Brachyura
- Family: Potamonautidae
- Subfamily: Liberonautinae
- Genus: Louisea; Cumberlidge, 1994

Species
- Louisea balssi (Bott, 1959); Louisea edeaensis (Bott, 1969)

Genus of crabs

Louisea is a genus of freshwater crabs in the family Potamonautidae, containing two species, Louisea balssi and Louisea edeaensis. Both species are endemic to Cameroon and listed as endangered species on the IUCN Red List.

Louisea edeaensis is known from only three specimens, which were collected in 1910 from two locations in Edéa and Yabassi, while Louisea balssi is only known from four specimens collected in the Bamenda highlands, and has not been seen alive since 1909.
