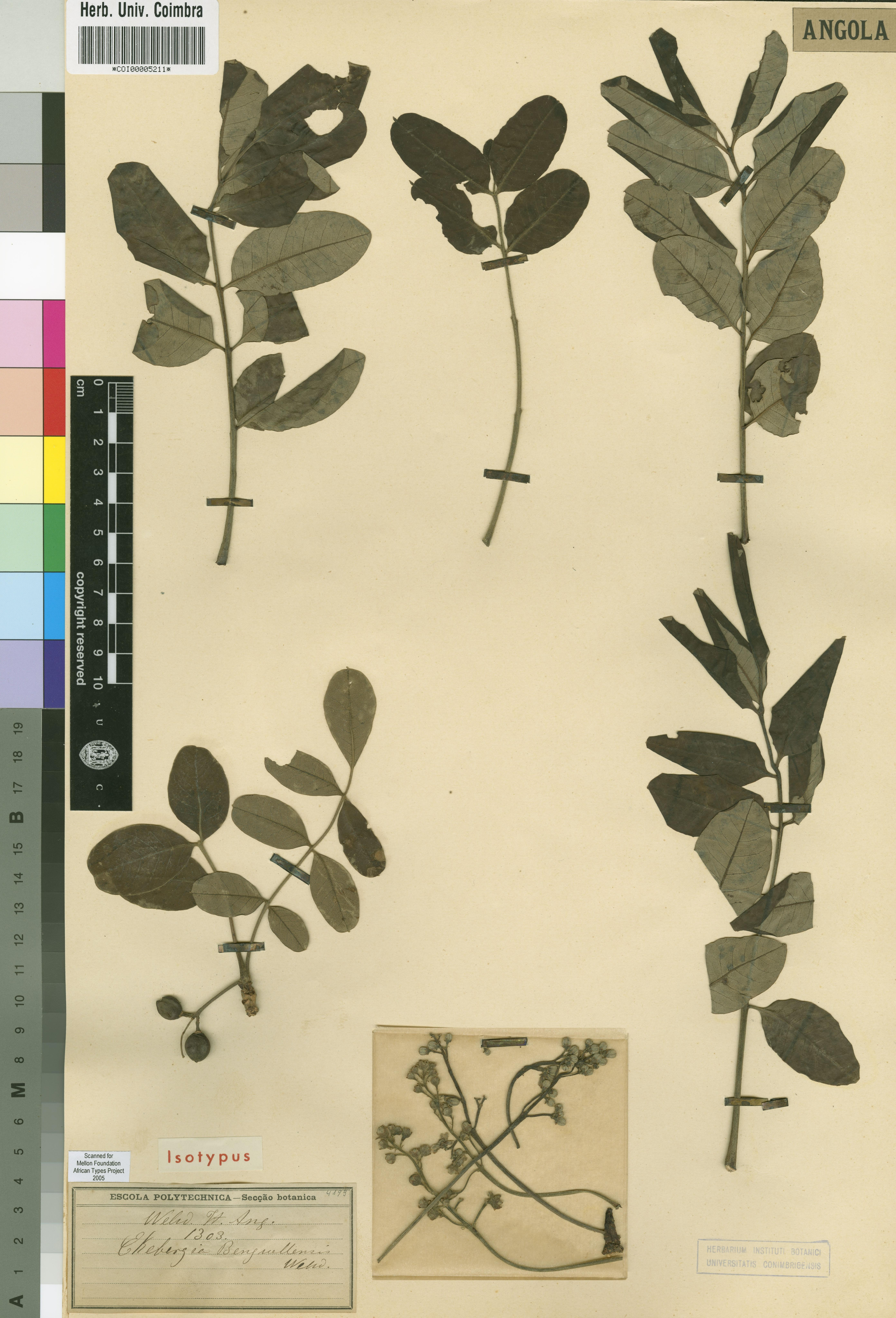

Conservation status
- Least Concern (IUCN 3.1)

Scientific classification
- Kingdom: Plantae
- Clade: Tracheophytes
- Clade: Angiosperms
- Clade: Eudicots
- Clade: Rosids
- Order: Sapindales
- Family: Meliaceae
- Genus: Ekebergia
- Species: E. benguelensis

Binomial name
- Ekebergia benguelensis Welw. ex C.DC.

Synonyms
- Ekebergia arborea Baker f.; Ekebergia discolor O.Hoffm.; Ekebergia fruticosa C.DC.; Ekebergia nana Harms; Ekebergia sclerophylla Harms; Ekebergia velutina Dunkley; Ekebergia welwitschii Hiern ex C.DC.

= Ekebergia benguelensis =

Species of tree

Ekebergia benguelensis, commonly known as the woodland dogplum, is a tree that is part of the Meliaceae family. The plant is native to Angola, Democratic Republic of the Congo, Malawi, Mozambique, Tanzania, Zambia and Zimbabwe.
