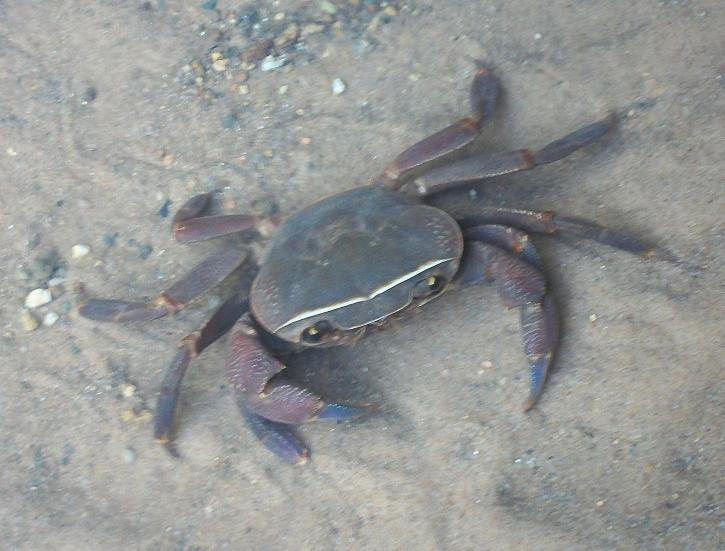

Conservation status
- Least Concern (IUCN 3.1)

Scientific classification
- Kingdom: Animalia
- Phylum: Arthropoda
- Class: Malacostraca
- Order: Decapoda
- Suborder: Pleocyemata
- Infraorder: Brachyura
- Family: Potamonautidae
- Genus: Potamonautes
- Species: P. sidneyi

Binomial name
- Potamonautes sidneyi (Rathbun, 1904)

Synonyms
- Potamon sidneyi Rathbun, 1904

= Potamonautes sidneyi =

Species of crab

Potamonautes sidneyi is a species of freshwater crab in the family Potamonautidae. The common name is the Natal river crab or Sidney's river crab, although they may also be referred to as "river crabs", "fresh water crabs" or "land crabs".

== Distribution ==
This species is widespread in KwaZulu-Natal, South Africa, from the foothills of the Drakensberg to the coast from Port Shepstone to Lake Sibayi. They are also found in the South African provinces of the Northern Cape, Mpumalanga, North West, Gauteng, Free State, Eastern Cape, and in the countries of Eswatini and Mozambique.

== Behaviour ==
These crabs commonly shelter in burrows that they dig into the side of muddy river banks or under rocks in rivers. They come out from their shelters at night or after rain. They mate outside of water and the female carries the eggs and young under her broad tail until they are fully formed miniature crabs. She then releases them into quiet pools in streams where the juveniles spend much of their time in the water. The young shelter under leaves, stones and among tree roots that enter the water. They spend more time on land as they mature.

== Ecological significance ==
River crabs utilise energy from diverse trophic levels and are important detritivores; reducing the particle size of organic debris to present a source of nutrition to collector and filter-feeding river fauna, and ensure resource recycling within the river ecosystem. These crabs are a primary source of food for Cape clawless otters and water mongoose, and may also be eaten by Nile monitors.
