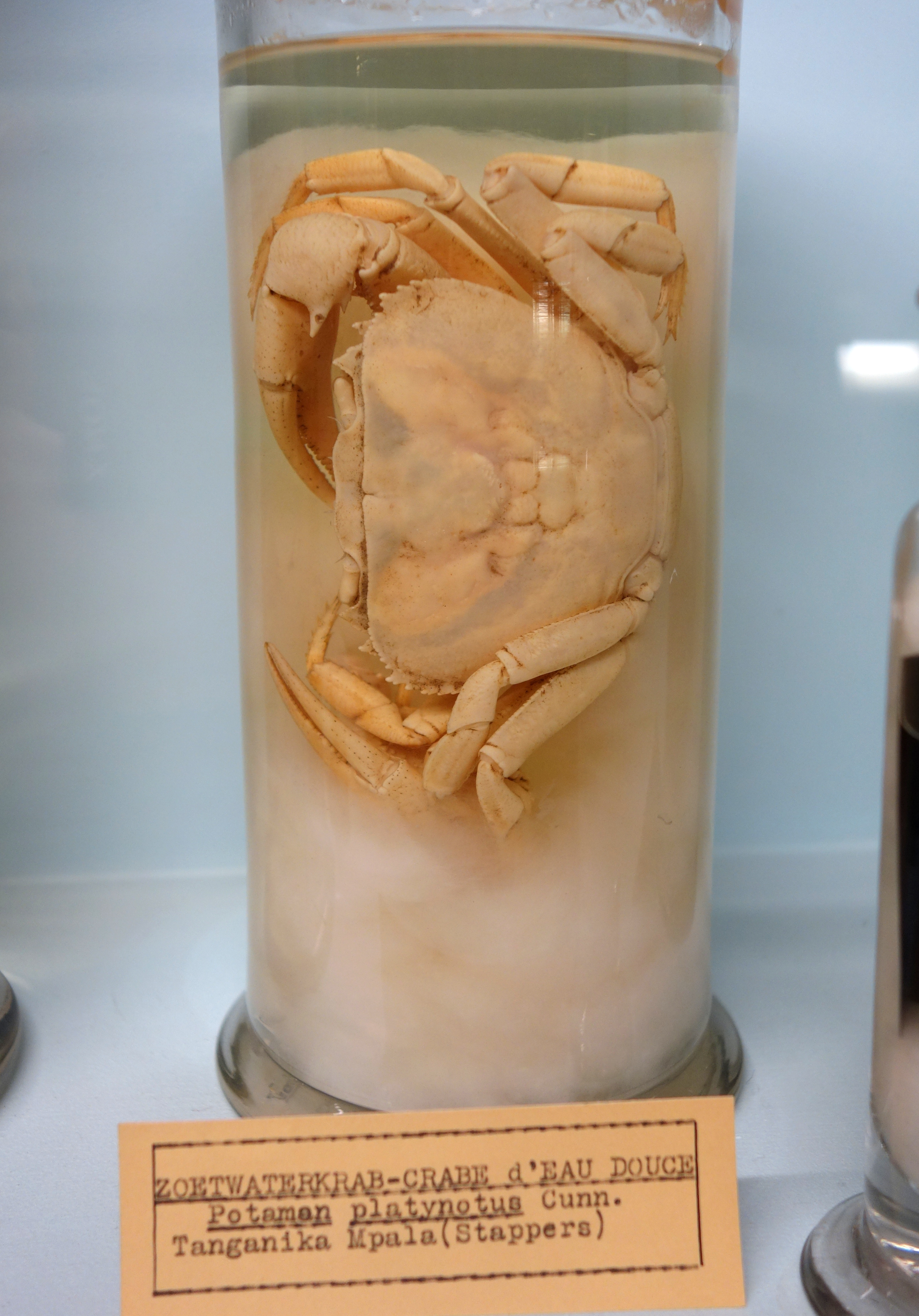
- Rotundopotamonautes platynotus

Scientific classification
- Domain: Eukaryota
- Kingdom: Animalia
- Phylum: Arthropoda
- Class: Malacostraca
- Order: Decapoda
- Suborder: Pleocyemata
- Infraorder: Brachyura
- Family: Potamonautidae
- Subfamily: Potamonautinae
- Genus: Rotundopotamonautes; Bott, 1955

Type species
- Rotundopotamonautes berardi (Audoiin, 1826)

= Rotundopotamonautes =

Genus of crabs

Rotundopotamonautes is a genus of crabs. It includes the following species:

- Rotundopotamonautes alluaudi (Bouvier, 1921)
- Rotundopotamonautes aloysiisabaudiae (Nobili, 1906)
- Rotundopotamonautes amalerensis (Rathbun, 1935)
- Rotundopotamonautes antheus (Colosi, 1920)
- Rotundopotamonautes berardi (Audouin, 1826)
- Rotundopotamonautes bipartitus (Hilgendorf, 1898)
- Rotundopotamonautes bourgaultae (Cumberlidge & Meyer, 2011)
- Rotundopotamonautes busungwe (Cumberlidge & Clark, 2017)
- Rotundopotamonautes bwindi (Cumberlidge & Clark, 2018)
- Rotundopotamonautes elgonensis (Cumberlidge & Clark, 2010)
- Rotundopotamonautes emini (Hilgendorf, 1892)
- Rotundopotamonautes entebbe (Cumberlidge & Clark, 2017)
- Rotundopotamonautes gonocristatus (Bott, 1955)
- Rotundopotamonautes holthuisi (Cumberlidge & Meyer, 2010)
- Rotundopotamonautes ignestii (Parisi, 1923)
- Rotundopotamonautes imatongensis (Cumberlidge & Clark, 2016)
- Rotundopotamonautes jeanneli (Bouvier, 1921)
- Rotundopotamonautes kantsyore Cumberlidge & Clark, 2017
- Rotundopotamonautes kivu (Cumberlidge & Clark, 2018)
- Rotundopotamonautes kundudo (Cumberlidge & Clark, 2012)
- Rotundopotamonautes loashiensis Bott, 1955
- Rotundopotamonautes loveni (Colosi, 1924)
- Rotundopotamonautes minor (Bott, 1955)
- Rotundopotamonautes morotoensis (Cumberlidge & Clark, 2016)
- Rotundopotamonautes mutandensis (Chace, 1942)
- Rotundopotamonautes neumanni (Hilgendorf, 1898)
- Rotundopotamonautes odhneri (Colosi, 1924)
- Rotundopotamonautes perparvus (Rathbun, 1921)
- Rotundopotamonautes pilosus (Hilgendorf, 1898)
- Rotundopotamonautes rodolphianus (Rathbun, 1909)
- Rotundopotamonautes rothschildi (Rathbun, 1909)
- Rotundopotamonautes rukwanzi (Corace, Cumberlidge & Garms, 2001)
- Rotundopotamonautes rwanda Cumberlidge & Krajenka, 2023
- Rotundopotamonautes rwenzori (Cumberlidge & Clark, 2018)
- Rotundopotamonautes subukia (Cumberlidge & Dobson, 2008)
- Rotundopotamonautes williamsi (Cumberlidge & Clark, 2010)
