= Tanzanonautes =

Tanzanonautes tuerkayi Temporal range: Oligocene

Scientific classification
- Kingdom: Animalia
- Phylum: Arthropoda
- Clade: Pancrustacea
- Class: Malacostraca
- Order: Decapoda
- Suborder: Pleocyemata
- Infraorder: Brachyura
- Family: Potamonautidae
- Genus: Tanzanonautes
- Species: T. tuerkai

Binomial name
- Tanzanonautes tuerkai Feldmann et al., 2007

Genus of crabs

Tanzanonautes tuerkayi is a species of fossil freshwater crab from Tanzania, the only species in the genus Tanzanonautes. It is the oldest known freshwater crab, and probably dates from the Oligocene; the next oldest specimens are from the Miocene. A number of fragmentary remains were discovered in the Songwe Valley part of the East African Rift in Mbeya Region, Tanzania (approximately 8°56′S 33°12′E), in fragile sandstone sediments. The animal had a carapace around 50 millimetres (2.0 in) across the widest part, which is around 15 mm (0.6 in) from the front of the carapace; the carapace is 44 mm (1.7 in) from front to back, and the slightly inward-curving rear edge of the carapace is 28 mm (1.1 in) across. The genus name refers to Tanzania, the country where the fossil was found, while the specific epithet commemorates Michael Türkay, an authority on freshwater crabs. The genus Tanzanonautes is assigned to the family Potamonautidae, although the characters mentioned in the family's diagnosis are missing from the fragmentary fossils available.
