= Ekebergia pterophylla =

Conservation status
- Least Concern (IUCN 3.1)

Scientific classification
- Kingdom: Plantae
- Clade: Tracheophytes
- Clade: Angiosperms
- Clade: Eudicots
- Clade: Rosids
- Order: Sapindales
- Family: Meliaceae
- Genus: Ekebergia
- Species: E. pterophylla

Binomial name
- Ekebergia pterophylla (C.DC.) Hofmeyr

Synonyms
- Trichilia alata N.E.Br.; Trichilia pterophylla C.DC.

Species of tree

Ekebergia pterophylla, commonly known as the rock ash, rock Cape ash, or Klipessenhout in Afrikaans, is a tree that is part of the Meliaceae family. The plant is native to Eswatini and South Africa where it occurs in the KwaZulu-Natal, Limpopo, Mpumalanga, Eastern Cape and the Western Cape.

The tree's FSA number is 299.
