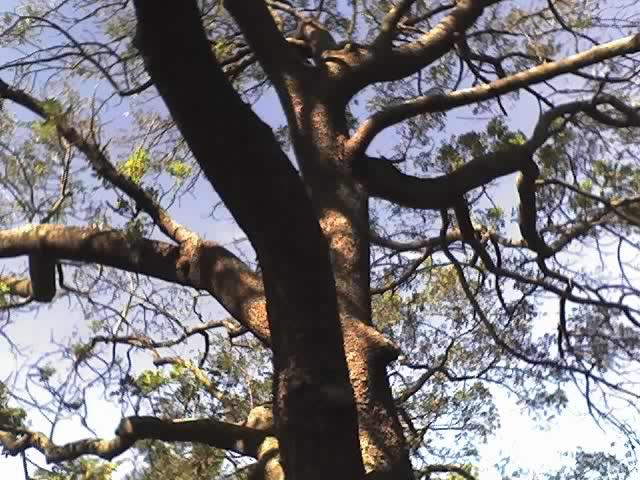
- Ekebergia capensis in South Africa

Scientific classification
- Kingdom: Plantae
- Clade: Tracheophytes
- Clade: Angiosperms
- Clade: Eudicots
- Clade: Rosids
- Order: Sapindales
- Family: Meliaceae
- Subfamily: Melioideae
- Genus: Ekebergia; Sparrm.

Synonyms
- Charia C.E.C.Fisch.

= Ekebergia =

Genus of plants

Ekebergia is a genus of flowering plants belonging to the family Meliaceae. They are dioecious trees or shrubs, with odd-pinnate leaves.

Its native range is tropical and southern Africa.

Its genus name of Ekebergia is in honour of Carl Gustaf Ekeberg (1716–1784), Swedish physician, chemist and explorer. It was published and described in Kongl. Vetensk. Acad. Handl. Vol.1779 on page 282 in 1779.

Known species:

- Ekebergia benguelensis Welw. ex C.DC.
- Ekebergia capensis Sparrm.
- Ekebergia pterophylla (C.DC.) Hofmeyr
- Ekebergia pumila I.M.Johnst.
