= Hoplebaea congoana =

Scientific classification
- Kingdom: Animalia
- Phylum: Arthropoda
- Clade: Pancrustacea
- Class: Insecta
- Order: Coleoptera
- Suborder: Polyphaga
- Infraorder: Scarabaeiformia
- Family: Scarabaeidae
- Genus: Hoplebaea
- Species: H. congoana

Binomial name
- Hoplebaea congoana (Brenske, 1897)

Synonyms
- Hoplia congoana Brenske, 1897; Hoplebaea colmanti Brenske, 1899

Species of beetle

Hoplebaea congoana is a species of beetle of the family Scarabaeidae. It is found in Gabon, Ivory Coast, the Democratic Republic of the Congo and the Republic of the Congo.

== Description ==
Adults reach a length of about 6.2 mm (0.24 in). They are reddish-brown, with a dark back of the head, and evenly short-haired all over.
