= Ekebergia pumila =

Scientific classification
- Kingdom: Plantae
- Clade: Tracheophytes
- Clade: Angiosperms
- Clade: Eudicots
- Clade: Rosids
- Order: Sapindales
- Family: Meliaceae
- Genus: Ekebergia
- Species: E. pumila

Binomial name
- Ekebergia pumila I.M.Johnst.

Species of tree

Ekebergia pumila is a shrub that is part of the Meliaceae family. The plant is endemic to Angola.
