= Hoplebaea freyi =

Scientific classification
- Kingdom: Animalia
- Phylum: Arthropoda
- Clade: Pancrustacea
- Class: Insecta
- Order: Coleoptera
- Suborder: Polyphaga
- Infraorder: Scarabaeiformia
- Family: Scarabaeidae
- Genus: Hoplebaea
- Species: H. freyi

Binomial name
- Hoplebaea freyi Kulzer, 1970

Species of beetle

Hoplebaea freyi is a species of beetle of the family Scarabaeidae. It is found in Cameroon and Ivory Coast.

== Description ==
Adults reach a length of about 7–7.5 mm (0.28–0.30 in). They are dull and black, with the pronotum and elytra quite densely covered with strong, very pointed white, as well as fine, yellowish hairs, but the ground colour is still clearly recognizable.
