= Potamonautes lividus =

Conservation status
- Vulnerable (IUCN 3.1)

Scientific classification
- Kingdom: Animalia
- Phylum: Arthropoda
- Class: Malacostraca
- Order: Decapoda
- Suborder: Pleocyemata
- Infraorder: Brachyura
- Family: Potamonautidae
- Genus: Potamonautes
- Species: P. lividus

Binomial name
- Potamonautes lividus Gouws, Stewart & Reavell, 2001

Species of crustacean

Potamonautes lividus, also known as the blue river crab, is a species of decapod in the family Potamonautidae. P. lividus is endemic to the country of South Africa in an area of 200 kilometers squared. The species prefers inland freshwater bodies in wetlands, bogs, marshes, freshwater swamp forests and peatlands (mire). P. livisus is found most often in the province Kwa-Zulu Natal in South Africa with the species also living in Richards bay, Ntambanana, Mtubatuba and unconfirmed sighting in the Amatikulu river which if confirmed, represents the southernmost members of the Potamonautes lividus species.

The IUCN conservation status of Potamonautes lividus is "VU" or vulnerable. The species faces a high risk of endangerment in the medium term due to residential development and commercial development of its habitat. Humans damming and modification of their freshwater wetlands, bogs, marshes and peatlands (mires) habitats also contribute to their declining.
