= False Bay Park =

Ramsar wetland reserve in north Kwa-Zulu-Natal, South Africa

- Valsbaai-natuurreservaat
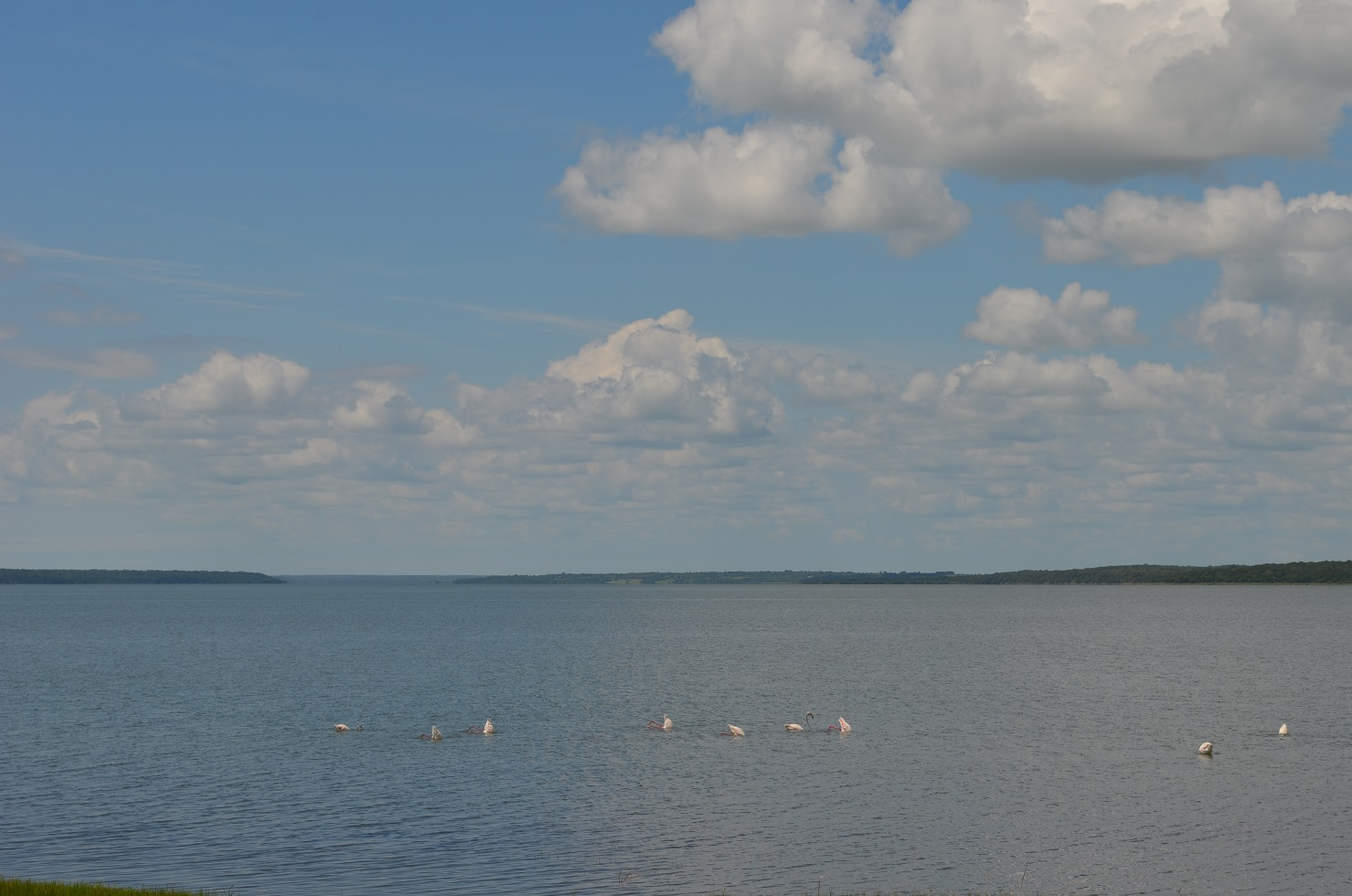
- False Bay
- Interactive map of False Bay Park
- Location: Northern KwaZulu-Natal, South Africa
- Coordinates: 27°58′S 32°23′E
- Area: 15 km^{2} (5.8 sq mi)
- Established: 2015
- Designated: Ramsar Convention site

False Bay Park (Afrikaans: Valsbaai-natuurreservaat), a Ramsar site wetland since 2015, is a nature reserve that protects the western shores of the freshwater bay, False Bay, and is situated near the coast of northern KwaZulu-Natal, South Africa. False Bay is connected to Lake St. Lucia and both are included in the iSimangaliso Wetland Park.

== Gallery ==
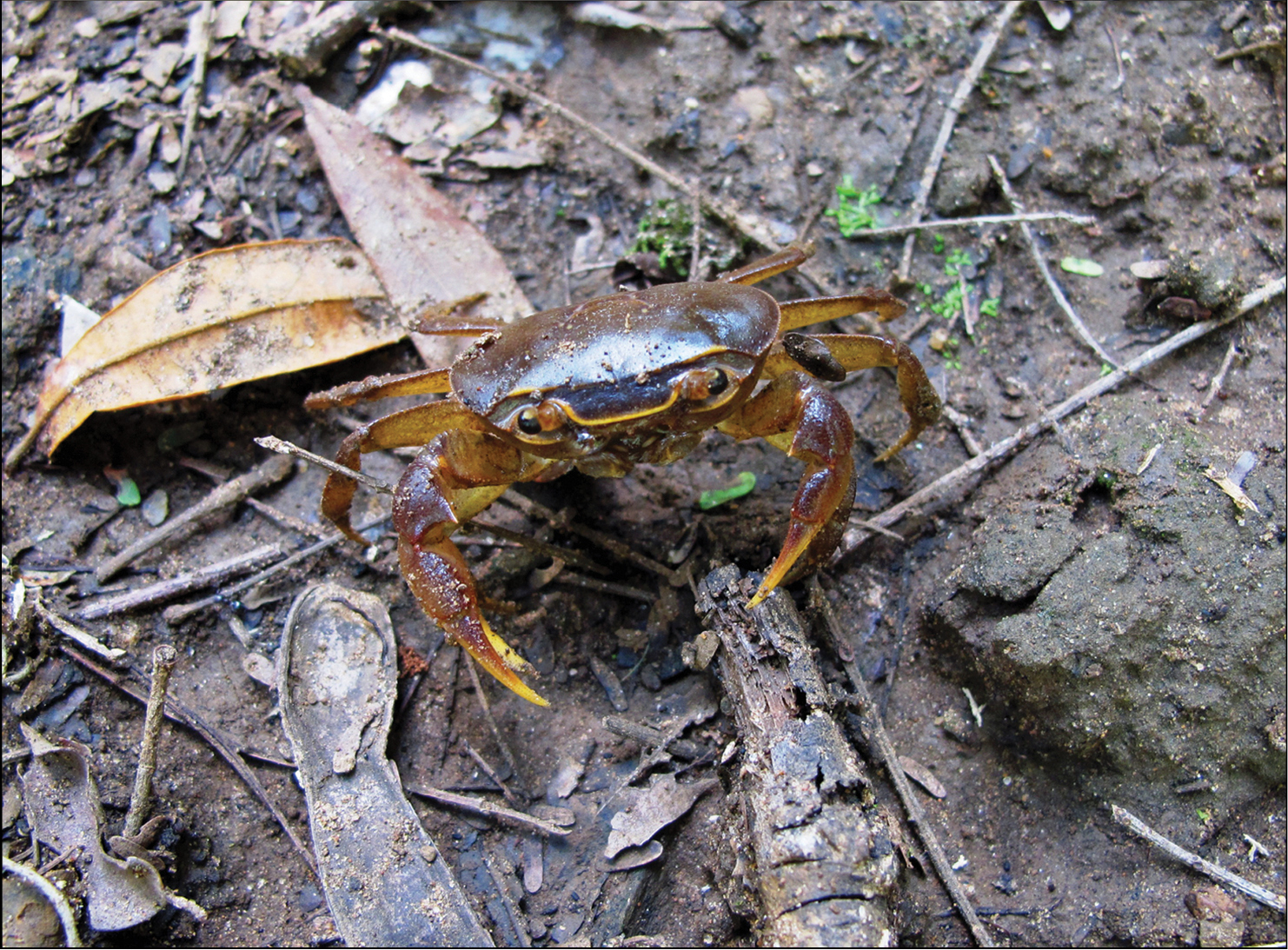
The western shores are home to the crustacean P. isimangaliso

== See also ==
- Protected areas of South Africa
- iSimangaliso Wetland Park
- Ramsar Convention
