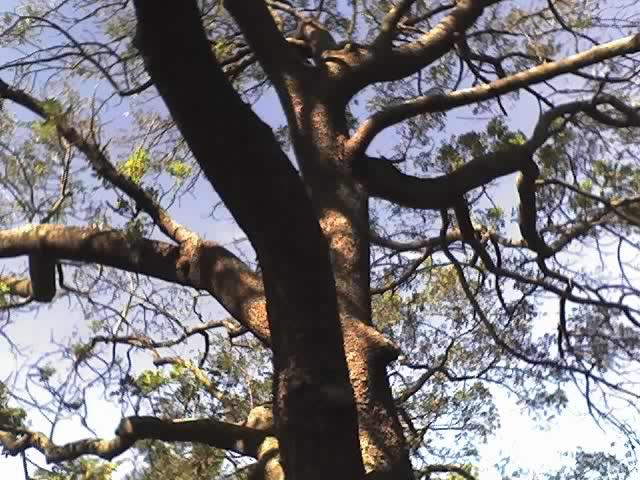

Conservation status
- Least Concern (IUCN 3.1)

Scientific classification
- Kingdom: Plantae
- Clade: Tracheophytes
- Clade: Angiosperms
- Clade: Eudicots
- Clade: Rosids
- Order: Sapindales
- Family: Meliaceae
- Genus: Ekebergia
- Species: E. capensis

Binomial name
- Ekebergia capensis Sparrm.

Synonyms
- Ekebergia rueppelliana; Ekebergia meyeri; Ekebergia buchananii

= Ekebergia capensis =

Species of tree

Ekebergia capensis is a tree in the family Meliaceae. It is commonly known as the Cape ash. Its range extends from the Eastern Cape of South Africa to Sudan and Ethiopia. It has been introduced onto Ascension Island.

== Description ==
Tree up to 30 meters tall which can be evergreen or semi-evergreen. Can be up to 1 meter diameter at breast height and may be slightly buttressed or fluted at the base branchlets with white lenticels. Leaves imparipinnate, with petiole and rhachis up to 35 cm long. Leaflets opposite or subopposite. Flowers white or pinkish white, sweet-scented. Borne in cymose panicles. Fruits are Drupes.

== Habitat ==
Seasonally dry tropical biome, often in edge environments of montane, mid-altitude or riparian forest. Can also be found in woodland and wooded grassland. Altitude between 600–2650 m.

== Gallery ==
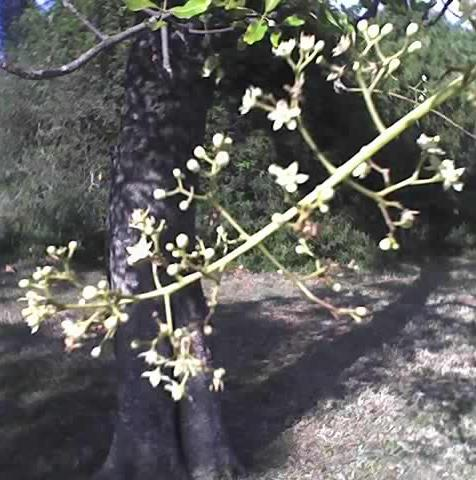
Flowers and stem of Ekebergia capensis

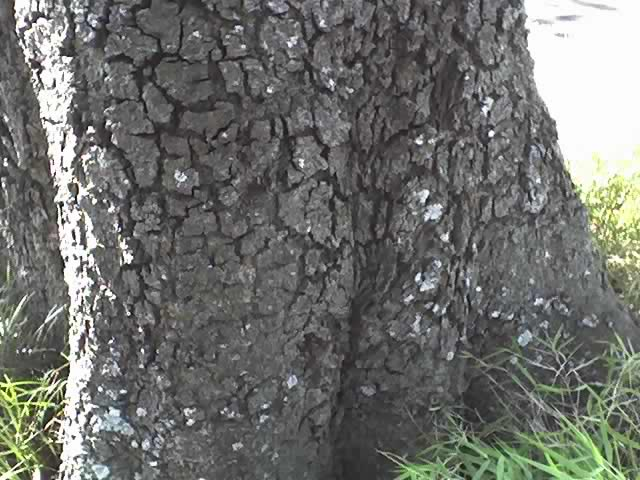
Stem of large Ekebergia capensis

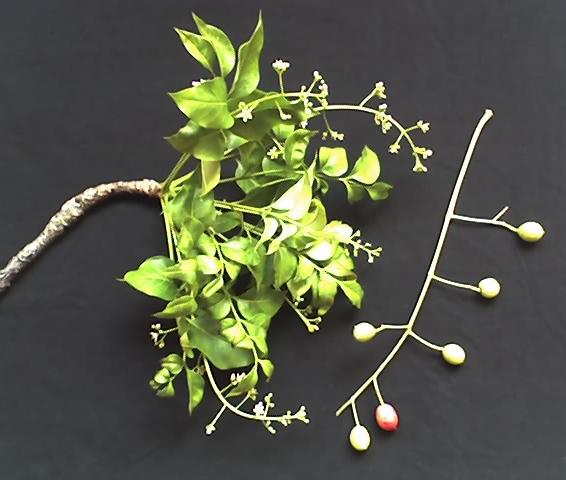
Flowers and fruit
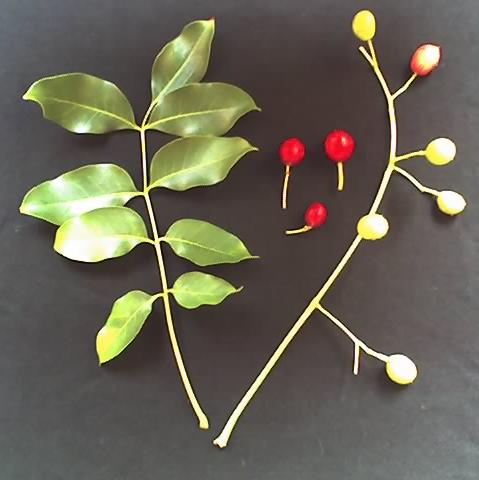
Compound leaf and fruit

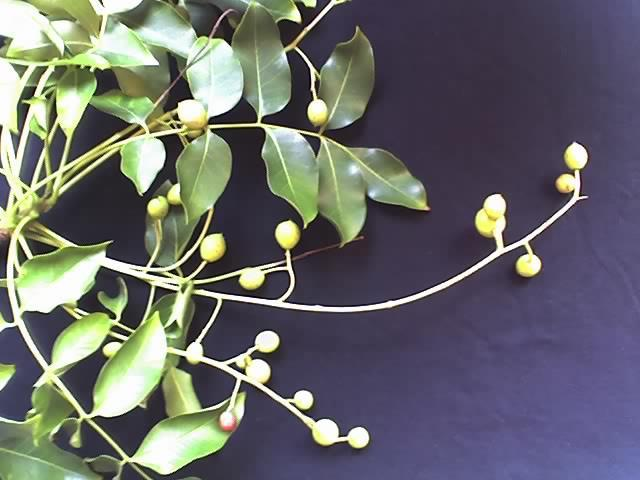
Leaves and fruit
