= Hoplebaea tessellatula =

Scientific classification
- Kingdom: Animalia
- Phylum: Arthropoda
- Class: Insecta
- Order: Coleoptera
- Suborder: Polyphaga
- Infraorder: Scarabaeiformia
- Family: Scarabaeidae
- Genus: Hoplebaea
- Species: H. tessellatula

Binomial name
- Hoplebaea tessellatula (Péringuey, 1902)

Synonyms
- Congella tessellatula Péringuey, 1902

Species of beetle

Hoplebaea tessellatula is a species of beetle of the family Scarabaeidae. It is found in South Africa (Eastern Cape, KwaZulu-Natal).

== Description ==
Adults reach a length of about 8 mm (0.31 in). They are fuscous brown, with the head black and the legs, especially the anterior ones, redder, covered on the upper and underside, and also on the legs with dense, ashy-grey, minute, appressed, slightly squamulose hairs. The pronotum has cicatricose marks and a median puncture from which springs a minute hair. The scutellum is covered with similar hairs and the elytra are somewhat plainly tri-costate on each side and have in addition a supra-marginal costule, they are finely coriaceous, and very densely hairy, but these hairs are sometimes wanting on the costae at regular intervals, and gives thus to the elytra a sub-tessellated appearance.
