= Richards Bay Minerals =

- Location: KwaZulu-Natal, South Africa
- Products: Titanium Dioxide; Pig iron Zircon
- Opened: 1976
- Company: Rio Tinto (74%); Blue Horizon Investments (24%); RBM permanent employees (2%)
- Website: rbm.co.za

Richards Bay Minerals (RBM) is a South African mining company. RBM's principal product is titanium dioxide in the form of an 85% pure titanium dioxide slag; the company also produces the higher-purity 95% titanium dioxide product rutile as well as pig iron and zircon.

== History ==
Richards Bay Minerals was created in 1976 for the extraction of heavy mineral sands from the dunes of northern KwaZulu-Natal.

From 2015 to 2018, Richards Bay Minerals stopped paying the Blue Horizons Investments trustees, arguing that the money was not benefiting the local communities. Armed violence and murders followed. In May 2021, RBM's general manager Richards Bay was shot down on his way to work. In 2021, when RBM finally paid the due deeds to Blue Horizons Investments. RBM then sued Blue Horizon Investments in 2022 for governance misconduct, asking that the Amakhosi family be removed from the trust fund.

In April 2019, Rio Tinto announced an investment into the Zulti South project, which is located south of Richards Bay. The investment value is $463 million (6.5 billion South African rand) and is aimed at sustaining the mine's capacity and extending the life of the mine. Production from Zulti South will be processed through RBM's existing infrastructure (pipelines, a mineral separation plant and smelting facility). Construction is scheduled to start in mid-2019 and the first commercial production expected in late 2021.

== Activities ==
The company's principal operations are just north of Richards Bay in KwaZulu-Natal, South Africa, in a 2-kilometer wide by 17-kilometer long strip of mineral-rich sand dunes. The area is known as Zulti North mine lease area and will continue to be mined until 2030. RBM mines the using a dredge mining technique, extracting the titanium-iron ore ilmenite as well as rutile and zircon from the sand. This feedstock is then processed into RBM's product lines at a facility which sorts the various materials and processes them to varying degrees into marketable materials.

RBM is controlled by Rio Tinto which owns 74% of it. Blue Horizon Investments (24%) and RBM permanent employees (2%) also have an interest in the mine. Prior to 2012, BHP Billiton owned 37% but that interest was later purchased by Rio Tinto in February 2012. Blue Horizon Investments is a Black Economic Empowerment trust that was allocated 24% of the company's capital in 2008. The Dube, Sokhulu, Mbonambi and Mkhwanazi tribes are the trust's main beneficiaries. In 15 years, the tribes earned R530-million in deeds from RBM.

RBM is the largest taxpayer of the province of KwaZulu-Natal. 5,000 people work at the site (2024).
