= Hoplebaea =

Scientific classification
- Kingdom: Animalia
- Phylum: Arthropoda
- Class: Insecta
- Order: Coleoptera
- Suborder: Polyphaga
- Infraorder: Scarabaeiformia
- Family: Scarabaeidae
- Subfamily: Melolonthinae
- Tribe: Hopliini
- Genus: Hoplebaea; Brenske, 1899

Synonyms
- Congella Péringuey, 1902

Genus of leaf beetles

Hoplebaea is a genus of beetles belonging to the family Scarabaeidae.

== Species ==
- Hoplebaea anguliceps Burgeon, 1945
- Hoplebaea congoana (Brenske, 1897)
- Hoplebaea freyi Kulzer, 1970
- Hoplebaea mashunensis (Péringuey, 1902)
- Hoplebaea nigrita (Péringuey, 1902)
- Hoplebaea rufolineata Burgeon, 1945
- Hoplebaea sassana Burgeon, 1945
- Hoplebaea tessellatula (Péringuey, 1902)
- Hoplebaea valida (Péringuey, 1902)
