= No. 262 Squadron RAF =

Former flying squadron of the Royal Air Force

- Active: 29 September 1942 – 15 February 1945
- Country: United Kingdom
- Branch: Royal Air Force
- Role: anti-submarine patrol squadron
- Part of: RAF Coastal Command
- Flying Boat: Consolidated Catalina

Insignia
- Squadron Badge: No badge authorised
- Squadron Codes: TR (1944); The same combination is also mentioned for 265 Squadron, in both cases it is not confirmed.

No. 262 Squadron RAF was an anti-submarine patrol squadron of the Royal Air Force between 1942 and 1945.

== History ==
The squadron was officially formed on 29 September 1942 at RAF Hednesford, although this was a paper exercise as the squadron personnel and equipment were at that moment in transit to Congella in South Africa. It did not start to operate as a squadron until arriving in Durban on 5 November 1942, arriving at Congella a week later, but still had to wait until February 1943 before their first Consolidated Catalina aircraft arrived. It began to operate long anti-submarine patrols over the Indian Ocean. From November 1943 it started to training crews from the South African Air Force with a detachment at Langebaanweg in the Cape Province, it still carried out anti-submarine patrols but began to restrict those patrols to within the South Africa Defence Area. On 15 February 1945 the squadron was disbanded when it was renumbered as 35 Squadron South African Air Force.

== Aircraft operated ==
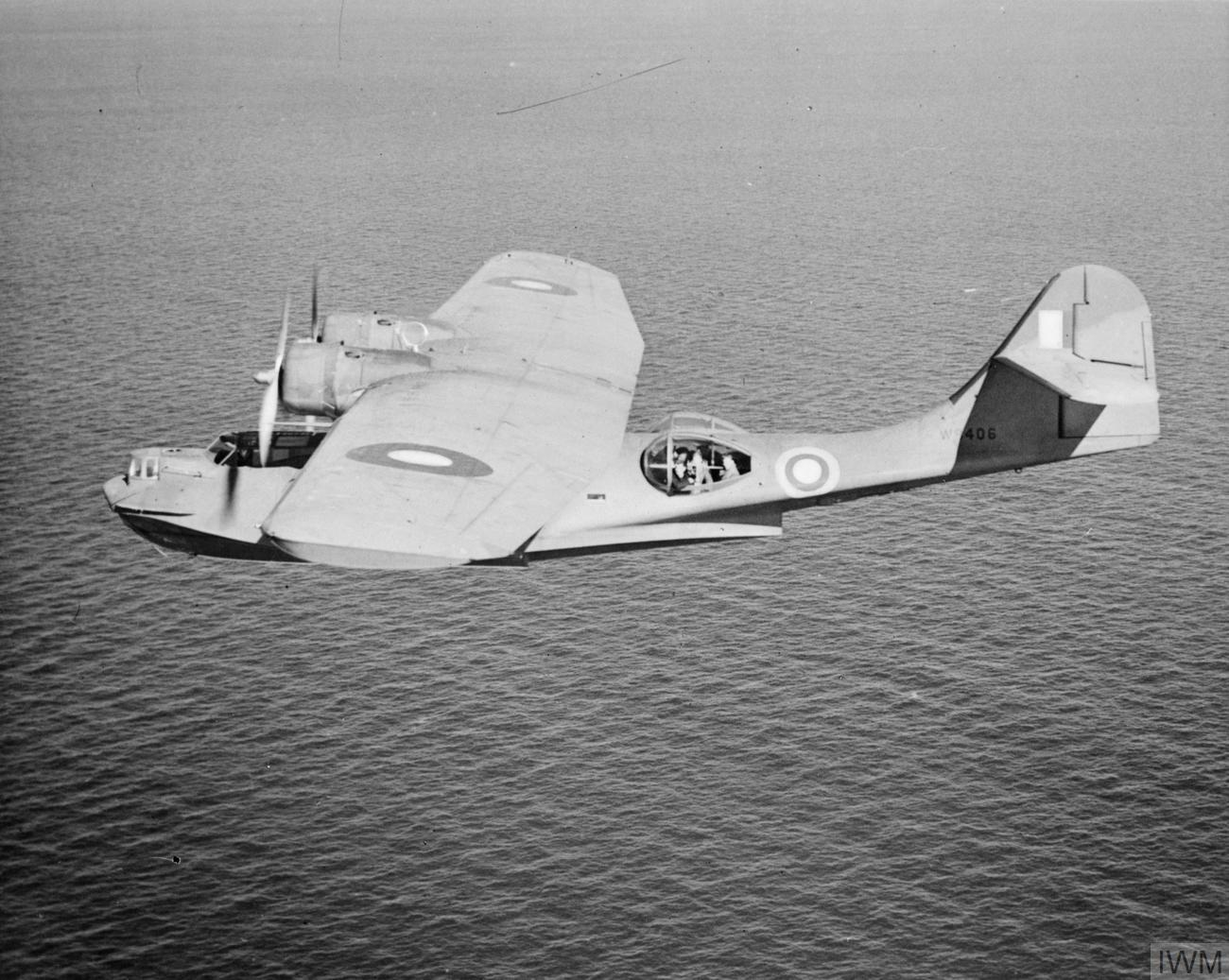
A Consolidated Catalina

From	To	Aircraft	Variant
1943	1945	Consolidated Catalina	Mk.Ib
1944	1945	Consolidated Catalina	Mk.IVb

== See also ==
- List of Royal Air Force aircraft squadrons
