= White milkwood =

White milkwood is a common name for several plants and may refer to:

- Sideroxylon inerme, native to South Africa
- Tabernaemontana alba, native to the Americas
