= St Lucia, South Africa =

St Lucia
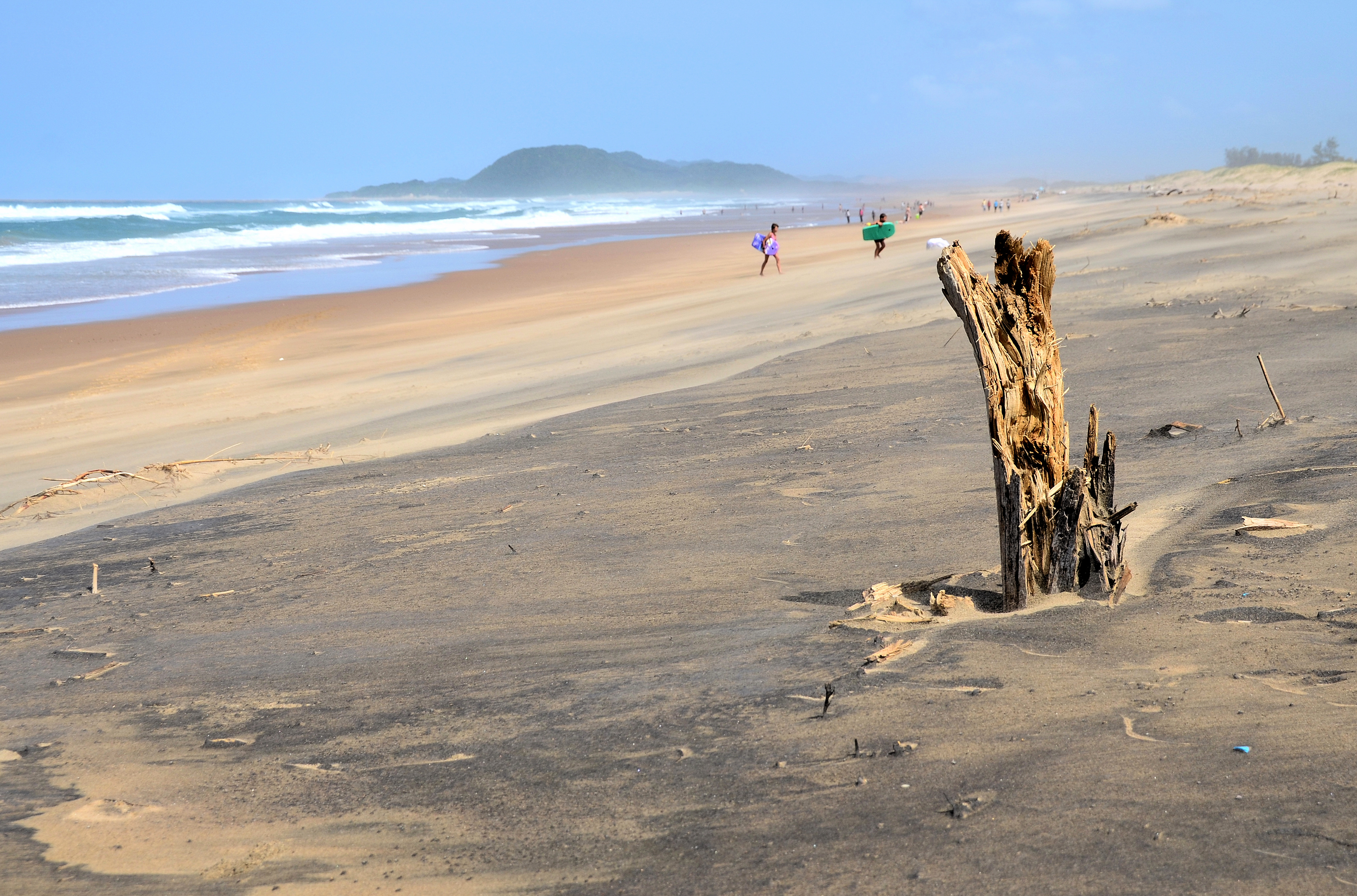
- Saint Lucia Main Beach

- Location within KwaZulu-Natal Location within South Africa
- Coordinates: 28.383°S 32.417°E
- Country: South Africa
- Province: KwaZulu-Natal
- District: Umkhanyakude
- Municipality: Mtubatuba

Area
  - Total: 2.68 km^{2} (1.03 sq mi)

Population (2022)
  - Total: 1,104
  - Density: 412/km^{2} (1,070/sq mi)

Racial makeup (2022)
  - Black African: 21.0%
  - Coloured: 3.8%
  - Indian/Asian: 2.1%
  - White: 72.3%
  - Other: 0.8%

First languages (2022)
  - Afrikaans: 47.2%
  - English: 41.9%
  - Zulu: 11.4%
  - Other: 1.5%
- Time zone: UTC+2 (SAST)
- PO box: 3936
- Area code: 035

St Lucia is a settlement in Umkhanyakude District Municipality in the KwaZulu-Natal province of South Africa. The small town is mainly a hub for the iSimangaliso Wetland Park.

== History ==
St Lucia was first named in 1554 as Rio dos Medos do Ouro (alternatively Rio dos Médãos do Ouro — River of the Gold Dunes) by the survivors of the Portuguese ship São Bento. At this stage, only the Tugela River mouth was known as St. Lucia. Later, in 1575, the Tugela River was named Tugela. On 13 December 1575, the day of the feast of Saint Lucy, Manuel Peresterello renamed the mouth area to Santa Lucia.

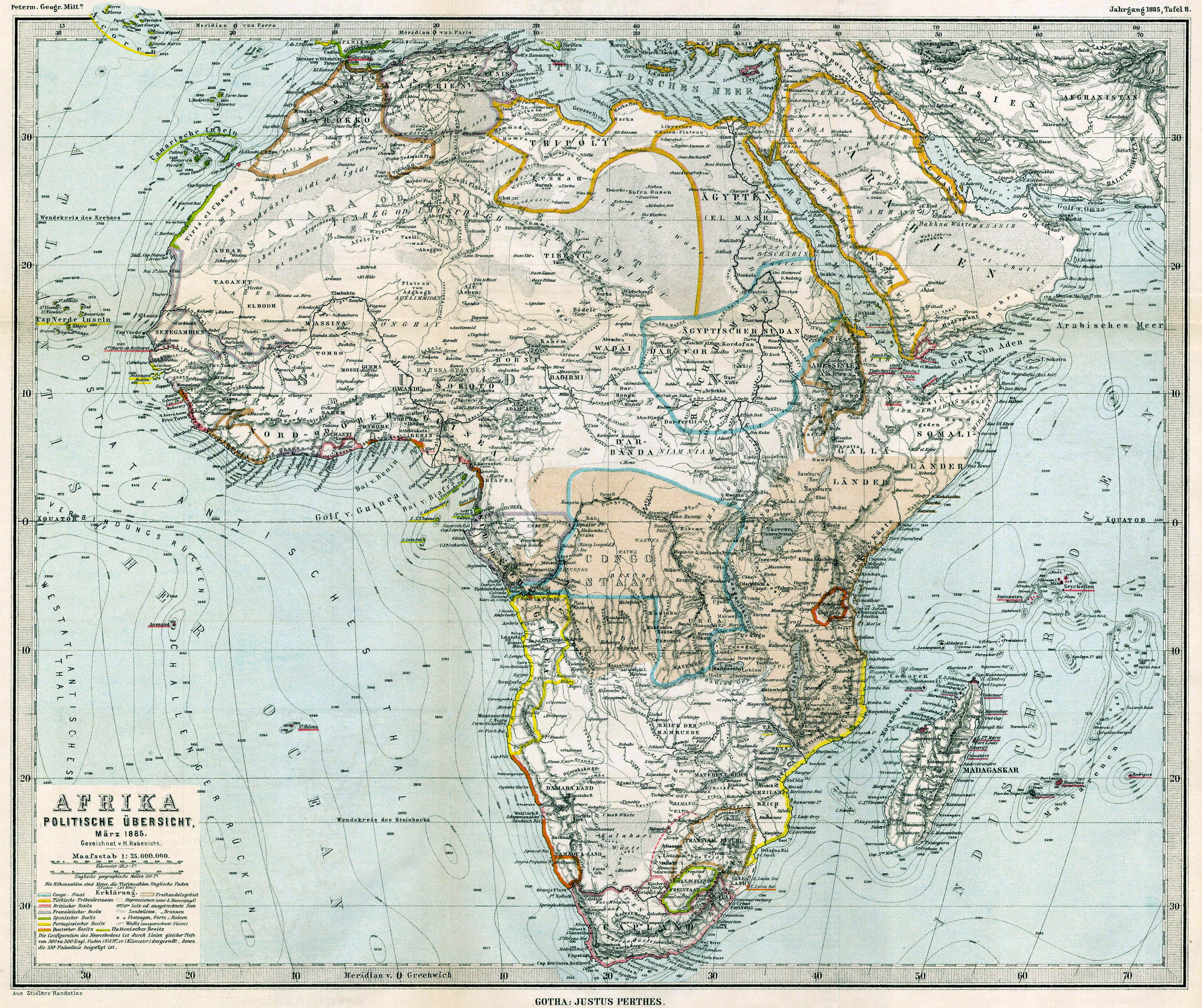
An 1885 map of Colonial Africa. Saint Lucia Bay as "deutscher Besitz“ (lit. German Possession) in orange.

Adolf Lüderitz wanted to create a colony in Santa Lucia Bay (deutsch: Santa-Lucia-Bucht), during the race for Africa. He was granted the right to establish a Reichsschutz (lit. Imperial protectorate) on 24 April 1884. Nevertheless, due to prior British claims (and to prevent any international incidents with either the Colony of Natal or Boer republic) the German Imperial Government finally renounced their territorial claims on the 7th of May 1885.

In 1822, St Lucia was proclaimed by the British as a township. In 1895, St Lucia Game Reserve, 30 km north of the town, was proclaimed. Since 1971, St Lucia Lake and the turtle beaches and coral reefs of Maputaland have been listed by the Convention on Wetlands of International Importance (Ramsar Convention). In December 1999, the park was listed as a UNESCO World Heritage Site.

Synthpop band St. Lucia is named after the town.

== Demographics ==
The largest ethnic group in St Lucia are White South Africans of English descent who make up 30.9% of St Lucia residents. The second largest ethnic group in St. Lucia are Zulu people, who make up 26.4% of St Lucia residents.

== Animals in the park ==
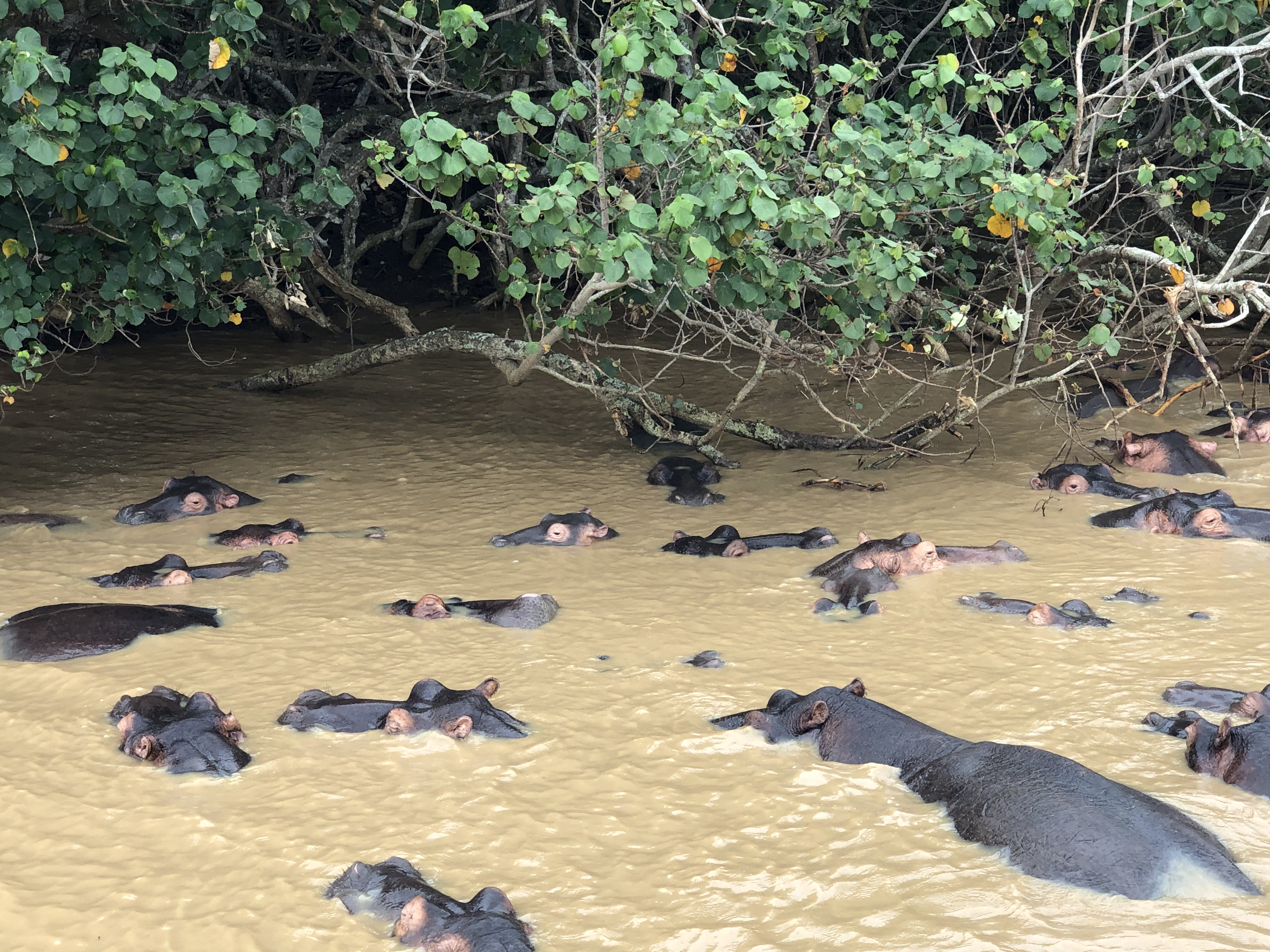
Hippopotamuses in the park

The park is also home to about 1,200 Nile Crocodiles and almost 800 hippopotamuses. Hippos often roam the streets at night.

Other animals include leopards, Greater Kudu, Black Rhinos, rich avifauna and numerous invertebrates.

== Climate ==
Under Köppen-Geiger climate classification system, it has a humid subtropical climate (Cfa).

Climate data for St Lucia
| Month | Jan | Feb | Mar | Apr | May | Jun | Jul | Aug | Sep | Oct | Nov | Dec | Year |
|---|---|---|---|---|---|---|---|---|---|---|---|---|---|
| Mean daily maximum °C (°F) | 29.3 (84.7) | 29.2 (84.6) | 28.6 (83.5) | 26.7 (80.1) | 24.6 (76.3) | 22.8 (73.0) | 22.5 (72.5) | 23.7 (74.7) | 24.4 (75.9) | 25.1 (77.2) | 26.3 (79.3) | 28.2 (82.8) | 26.0 (78.7) |
| Daily mean °C (°F) | 25.2 (77.4) | 25.2 (77.4) | 24.5 (76.1) | 22.4 (72.3) | 19.9 (67.8) | 17.7 (63.9) | 17.5 (63.5) | 19 (66) | 20.3 (68.5) | 21.1 (70.0) | 22.5 (72.5) | 24.2 (75.6) | 21.6 (70.9) |
| Mean daily minimum °C (°F) | 21.2 (70.2) | 21.2 (70.2) | 20.4 (68.7) | 18.2 (64.8) | 15.3 (59.5) | 12.6 (54.7) | 12.6 (54.7) | 14.3 (57.7) | 16.2 (61.2) | 17.2 (63.0) | 18.7 (65.7) | 20.3 (68.5) | 17.3 (63.2) |
| Average precipitation mm (inches) | 139 (5.5) | 133 (5.2) | 120 (4.7) | 100 (3.9) | 78 (3.1) | 59 (2.3) | 58 (2.3) | 59 (2.3) | 72 (2.8) | 103 (4.1) | 111 (4.4) | 97 (3.8) | 1,129 (44.4) |
| Average rainy days | 12 | 12 | 11 | 9 | 8 | 7 | 7 | 7 | 9 | 12 | 13 | 10 | 117 |
| Mean daily sunshine hours | 8 | 8 | 8 | 7 | 8 | 8 | 8 | 8 | 7 | 7 | 7 | 8 | 8 |
Source 1: Climate-Data.org
Source 2: Weather2Travel (rainy days, sunshine)

St Lucia mean sea temperature
| Jan | Feb | Mar | Apr | May | Jun | Jul | Aug | Sep | Oct | Nov | Dec |
|---|---|---|---|---|---|---|---|---|---|---|---|
| 26 °C (79 °F) | 27 °C (81 °F) | 27 °C (81 °F) | 26 °C (79 °F) | 25 °C (77 °F) | 23 °C (73 °F) | 22 °C (72 °F) | 22 °C (72 °F) | 22 °C (72 °F) | 23 °C (73 °F) | 24 °C (75 °F) | 25 °C (77 °F) |
