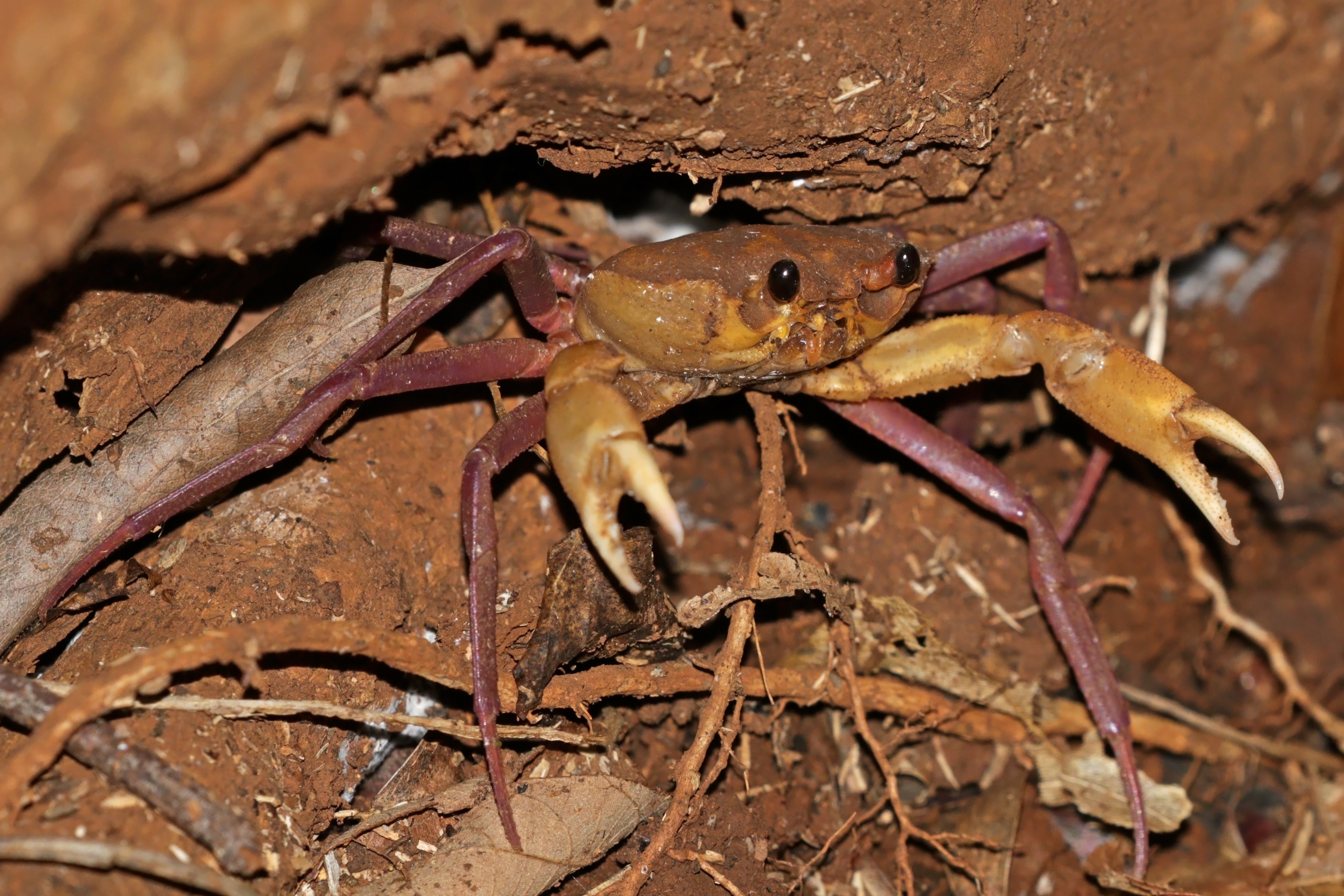
- Malagasy freshwater crab (Madagapotamon humberti), Ankarana Reserve, Madagascar

Scientific classification
- Kingdom: Animalia
- Phylum: Arthropoda
- Clade: Pancrustacea
- Class: Malacostraca
- Order: Decapoda
- Suborder: Pleocyemata
- Infraorder: Brachyura
- Superfamily: Potamoidea
- Family: Potamonautidae; Bott, 1970

= Potamonautidae =

Family of crabs

Potamonautidae is a family of freshwater crabs endemic to Africa, including the islands of Madagascar, the Seychelles, Zanzibar, Mafia, Pemba, Bioko, São Tomé, Príncipe and Sherbro Island. Fossil remains dating from the Late Miocene period have been attributed to the family Potamonautidae.

It comprises the following subfamilies and genera:

Liberonautinae Cumberlidge & Daniels, 2022
- Buea Cumberlidge, Mvogo Ndongo, Clark & Daniels, 2019
- Liberonautes Bott, 1955
- Louisea Cumberlidge, 1994
- Potamonemus Cumberlidge & Clark, 1992
- Sudanonautes Bott, 1955
Potamonautinae, Bott, 1970
- Acanthothelphusa Ortmann, 1897
- Arcopotamonautes Bott, 1955
- Erimetopus Rathbun, 1894
- Longipotamonautes Bott, 1955
- Maritimonautes Cumberlidge & Daniels, 2022
- Nesonautes Cumberlidge & Daniels, 2022
- Occidensonautes Cumberlidge & Daniels, 2022
- Platythelphusa A. Milne-Edwards, 1887
- Potamonautes MacLeay, 1838
- Rotundopotamonautes Bott, 1955
- †Tanzanonautes Feldmann, O'Connor, Stevens, Gottfried, Roberts, Ngasala, Rasmusson & Kapilima, 2007
