= Bonaire National Marine Park =

Marine park in Bonaire island

- IUCN category V (protected landscape/seascape)
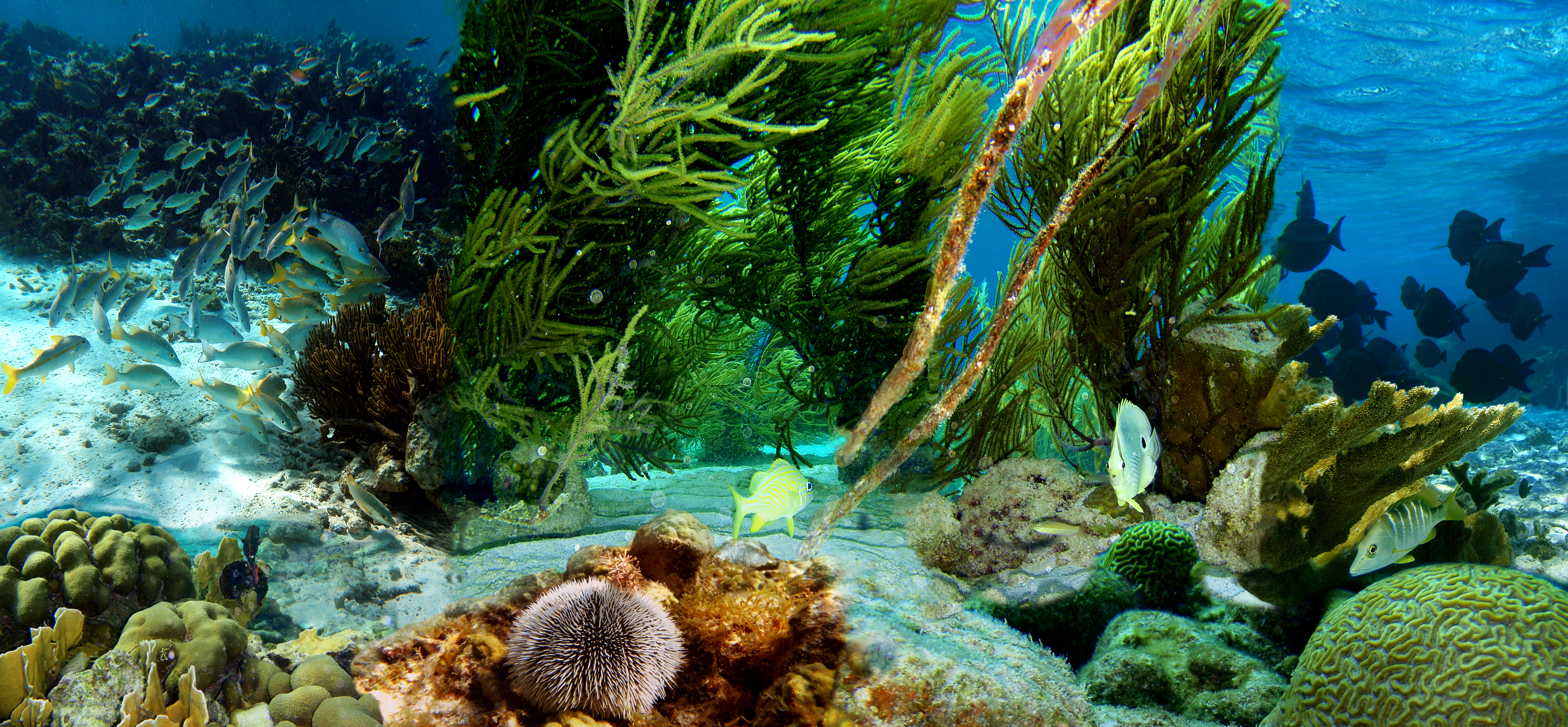
- Underwater life of Klein Bonaire. Composite of 8 photos from snorkeling on a flat coral reef off the islet Klein Bonaire.

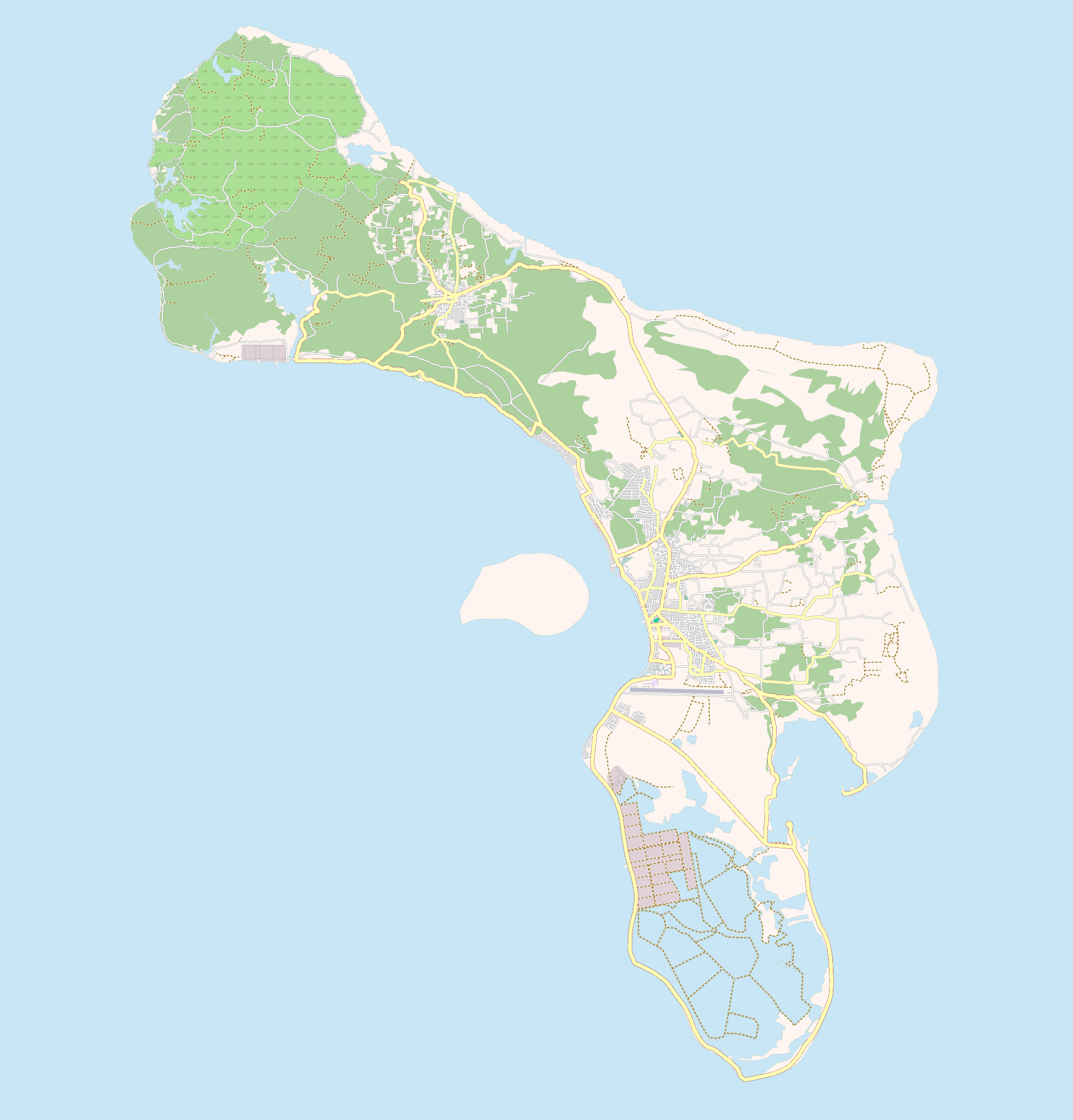
- Location within Bonaire Location within ABC islands (Lesser Antilles) Location within the Caribbean
- Location: Bonaire, Caribbean Netherlands
- Nearest town: Rincon
- Coordinates: 12.1717°N 68.2937°W
- Area: 27 km^{2} (10 sq mi)
- Established: 1979
- Operator: STINAPA Bonaire

The Bonaire National Marine Park (BNMP) is one of the oldest marine reserves in the world. It includes the sea around Bonaire and Klein Bonaire from the high water line to a depth of sixty meters (approximately 200 feet). The park was established in 1979 and covers 2700 hectares (6700 acres) and includes a coral reef, seagrass, and mangrove vegetation. The Lac Bay lagoon is also part of the underwater park.

In 1999, the underwater park received the status of national park from the Netherlands Antilles. The uninhabited island Klein Bonaire was added to the underwater park as a legally protected nature reserve in 2001. The west side of Bonaire teems with diving sites that are easily accessible from the shore. The dive sites around Klein Bonaire are accessible by boat for divers. With the exception of a small area, the BNMP is completely open to divers with a total of 86 public dive sites.

Due to an infiltration of stony coral tissue loss disease (SCTLD), scuba diving is currently prohibited at the dive sites located off the shores of Bonaire's Washington Slagbaai National Park. SCTLD has also resulted in Klein Bonaire being closed to visitors in the afternoon. Signs posted at the island's dive sites and dive shops instruct divers and snorkelers on how to sanitize their gear to help prevent the spread of SCTLD, with most dive shops offering sanitizing rinse bins. Snorkelers heading to Washington Slagbaai Park are required to stop at the ranger-run sanitizing stations just inside the park. Dive sites can close without warning, so check with your dive shop or STINAPA prior to heading out to dive.

== Geography ==
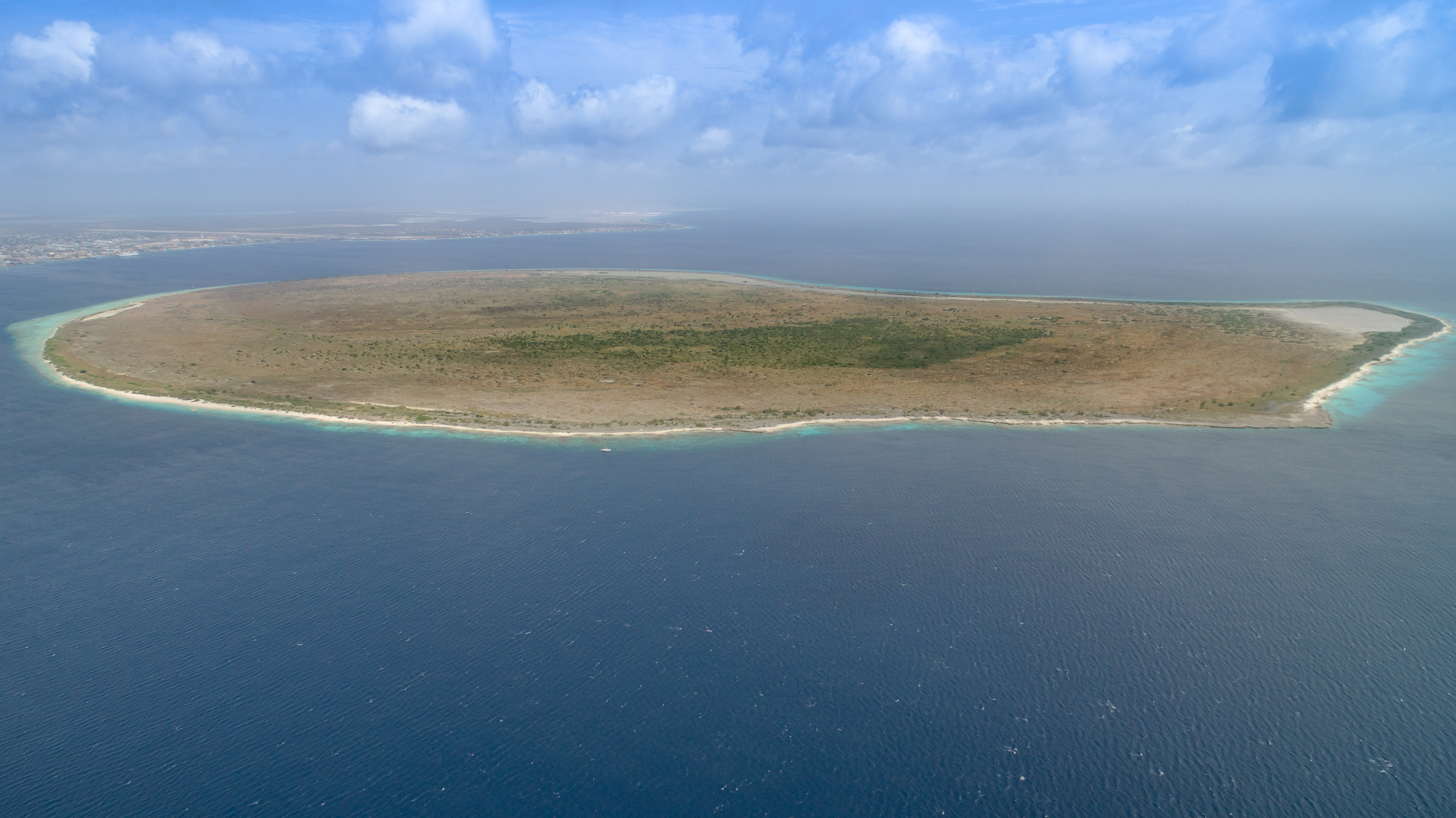
Aerial photo of Klein Bonaire

The national park covers the waters around Bonaire from the high water mark to a depth of 60 meters. Also some coastal stretches with mangrove forests, for example in the lagoon Lac. Part of the park is also the uninhabited island of Klein Bonaire. The national park also contains several important wetlands, which are particularly protected under the Ramsar Convention. In general Bonaire reef ecosystem has fewer macroalgae, a higher coral cover and more young corals per square metre than comparable reefs on UNESCO List of World Heritage in Danger such as Belize Barrier Reef Reserve System.

== Flora and fauna ==
=== Open water ===
The flora and fauna of the open water off the coast of Bonaire are not well researched. The water, as typical of the region, is quite warm and contains few natural nutrients, but large quantities of phytoplankton live in this area. Large fish occasionally observed in this area include tuna, wahoo, marlin and swordfish. Also whale sharks have already been spotted in the waters.

=== Seabed ===
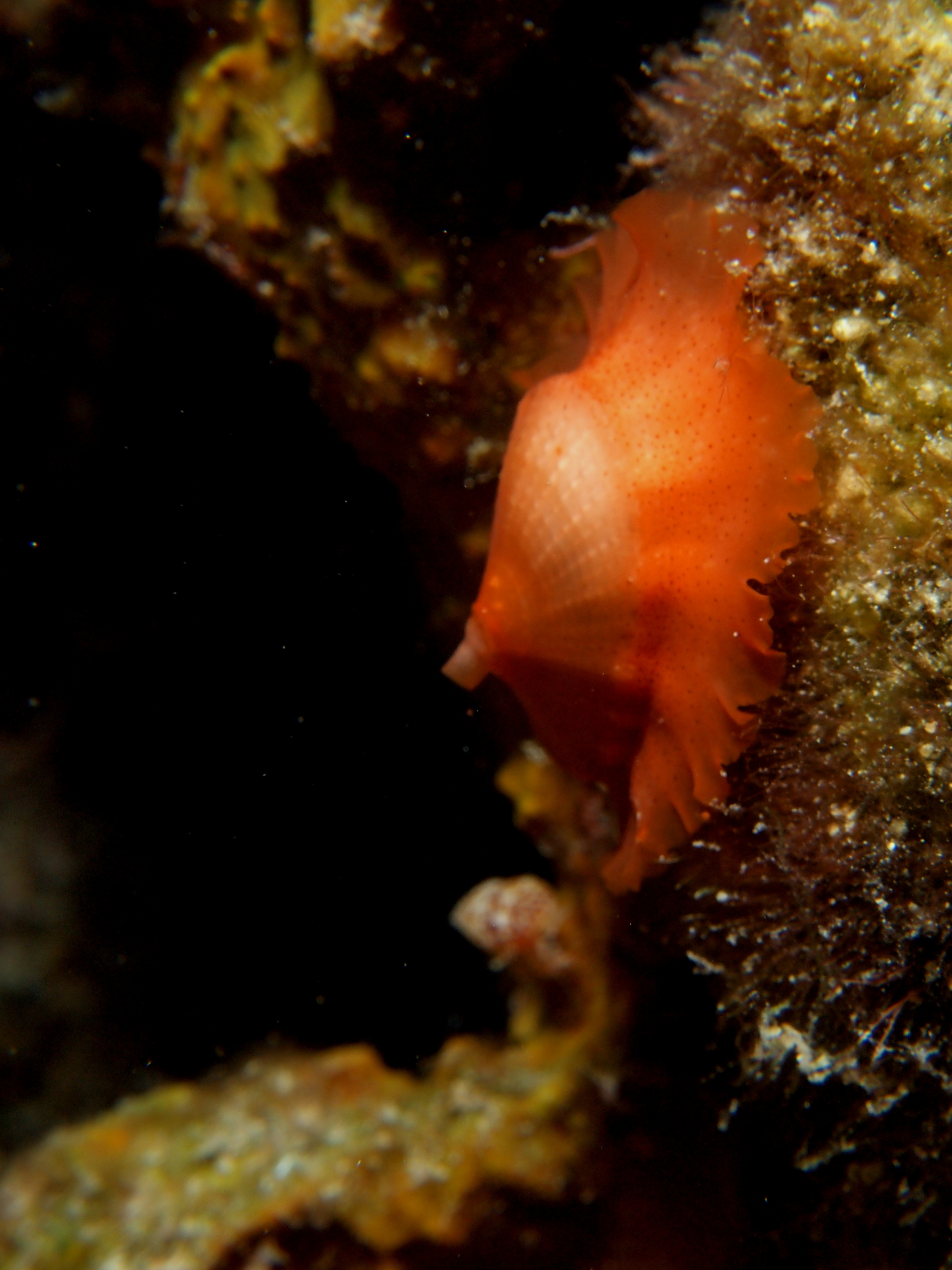
Lucapina adspersa, a keyhole limpet. Photographed in the Bonaire National Marine Park in 2011.

At the bottom of the Bonaire National Marine Park are extensive seagrass beds, which are of the seagrass species Thalassia testudinum and Syringodium filiforme and green algae, dominantly of the genus Halimeda. In the seagrass beds, one can find a nursery for reef fish and a foraging ground for endangered queen conch and green turtles as well. They are important for the egg-laying and rearing of the young for many species of fish. In addition, large populations of marine snails, such as flamingo tongue snails (Cyphoma gibbosum), live here.

=== Coral reefs ===
Bonaire is surrounded by fringing reefs. These consist of about 60 different coral species, including brain corals, elkhorn corals, fire corals and gorgonians. The reefs offer a variety of marine life. Some of the most common fish species are surgeonfish, parrotfish, reefperch and wrasses. In addition, countless invertebrates such as shrimp, crayfish and squid live here. Bonaire's coral reefs were seriously damaged in 1999 by hurricane Lenny. Furthermore, they are threatened by the effects of pollutants and the warming of the sea.

=== Lac bay ===
In the lagoon of Lac Bay is the only significant concentration of mangroves on Bonaire. Here grow red, black and white mangrove as well as button mangrove. The 700-acre (280 ha) lagoon has been a Ramsar site since the 1980s, offering habitat to green sea turtle and other endangered species, such as queen conch (Strombus gigas).

== Tourism ==
Already in 1939, the famous diving pioneer Hans Hass visited Bonaire and reported in his books on the rich underwater world.

Bonaire National Marine Park known as one of the hotspots for divers in the Caribbean and as one of the world's best places for snorkeling. For example, Forbes magazine ranked BNMP among the top 10 must-dive destinations in the world in 2017.

In the Bonaire Marine Park, Dixon et al. (1994) found that most divers seldom venture further than 300 m in one direction and that there was a decreasing physical impact on reef communities with increasing distance from a mooring buoy. Analyzing coral cover, they estimate that the diver carrying capacity threshold for the Bonaire Marine Park is between 4000 and 6000 dives per site per year.

In addition, various activities such as kitesurfing, sailing and windsurfing are offered in the area of the Bonaire National Marine Park.

Unique to the Bonaire National Marine Park is that it runs entirely on its own income (without subsidies). The income comes from an entrance fee for divers. Other users, such as swimmers, surfers, kite boarders, kayakers and water sports enthusiasts, pay a lower entrance fee. This also gives access to the Washington Slagbaai National Park. In addition to nature protection, the BNMP provides information about responsible diving to tourists and the maintenance of moorings (buoys) for boats with divers. The management is in the hands of the Stichting Nationale Parken Bonaire (STINAPA) which also manages the Washington Slagbaai National Park.

== See also ==
- Environmental issues with coral reefs#Caribbean
- List of reefs
