= Geography of Florida =

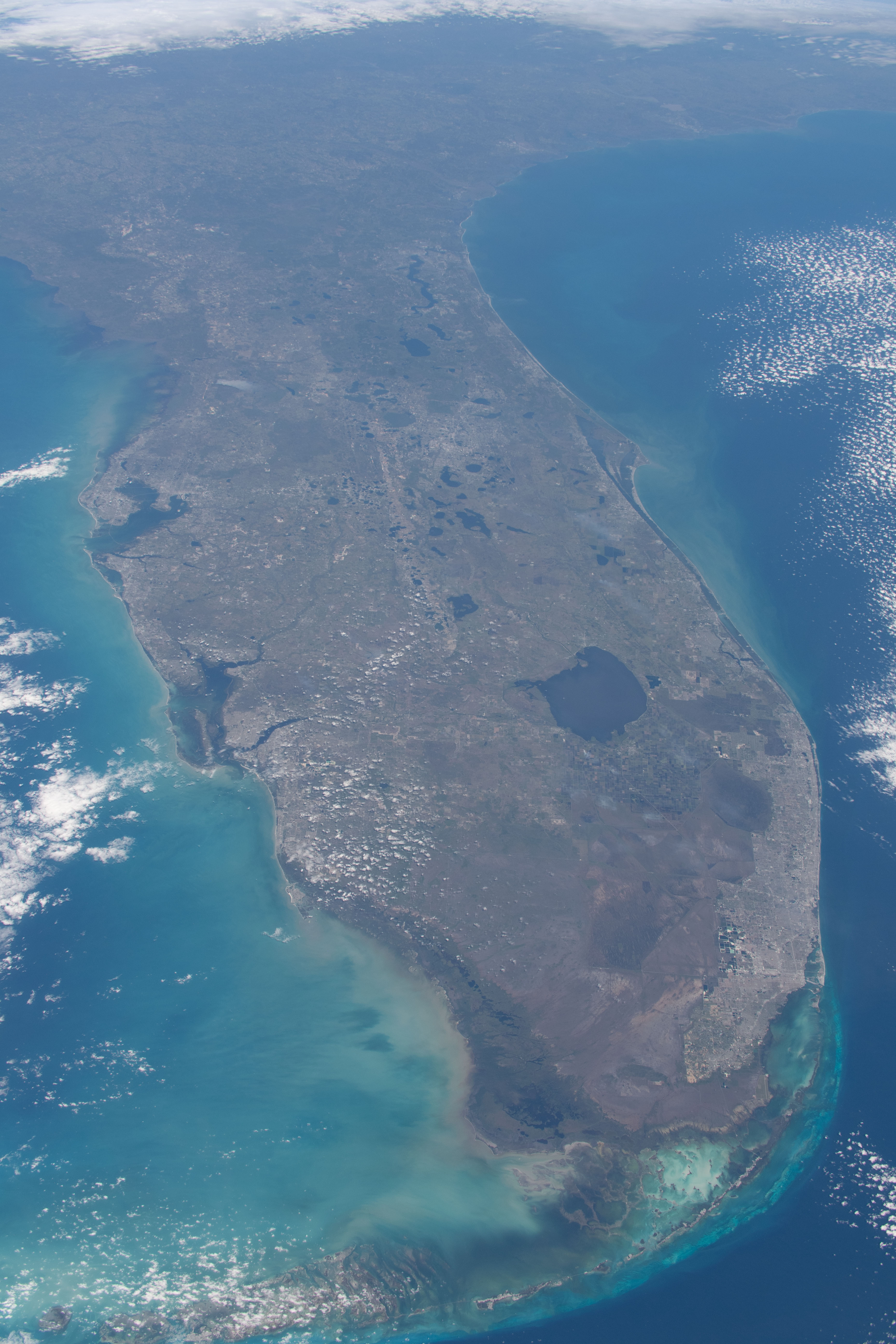
A satellite image of Florida.

Much of the state of Florida is situated on a peninsula between the Gulf of Mexico, the Atlantic Ocean, and the Straits of Florida. Spanning two time zones, it extends to the northwest into a panhandle along the northern Gulf of Mexico. It is bordered on the north by the states of Georgia and Alabama, on the west, at the end of the panhandle, by Alabama. It is near The Bahamas, and several Caribbean countries, particularly Cuba. Florida has 131 public airports, and more than 700 private airports, airstrips, heliports, and seaplane bases. Florida is one of the largest states east of the Mississippi River, and only Alaska and Michigan are larger in water area.

== Regions of Florida ==
- Northwest (Pensacola) – Escambia, Okaloosa, Santa Rosa, Bay, Walton, Jackson, Washington, Holmes, Gulf, Calhoun, Franklin, Liberty
- North Central (Tallahassee—Gainesville) – Marion, Leon, Alachua, Citrus, Columbia, Levy, Suwannee, Gadsden, Wakulla, Bradford, Taylor, Gilchrist, Madison, Dixie, Jefferson, Union, Hamilton, Lafayette
- Northeast (Jacksonville) – Duval, St. Johns, Clay, Nassau, Putnam, Baker
- West Central (Tampa Bay) – Hillsborough, Pinellas, Pasco, Sarasota, Manatee, Hernando, Highlands, DeSoto, Hardee
- Central (Orlando) – Orange, Polk, Osceola, Lake, Sumter
- East Central (Daytona Beach) – Brevard, Volusia, Seminole, Flagler
- Southwest (Fort Myers) – Lee, Collier, Charlotte, Hendry, Glades
- Southeast (West Palm Beach) – Palm Beach, St. Lucie, Indian River, Martin, Okeechobee
- South (Miami) – Miami-Dade, Broward, Monroe

== Physiogeography ==
Florida has three distinct physiographic provinces: Gulf Coastal Lowlands, Atlantic Coastal Lowlands, and Interior Highlands. The coastal lowlands rim the entirety of the peninsula and panhandle from the shoreline to 30 to 50 miles (48 to 80 km) inland, merging with the Interior Highland. Florida is further divided into 10 geomorphological districts and 71 geomorphological provinces.

=== Terrain ===
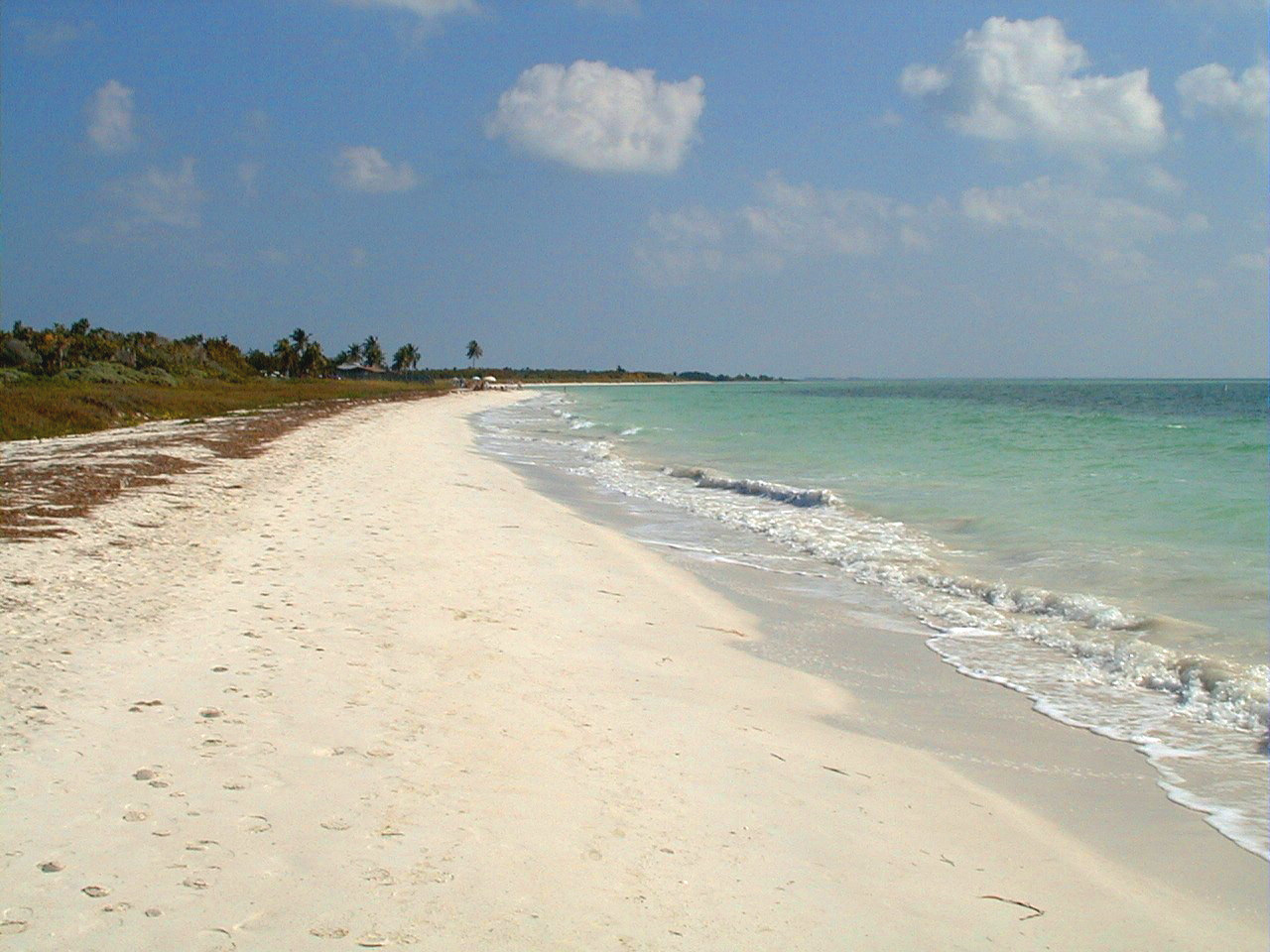
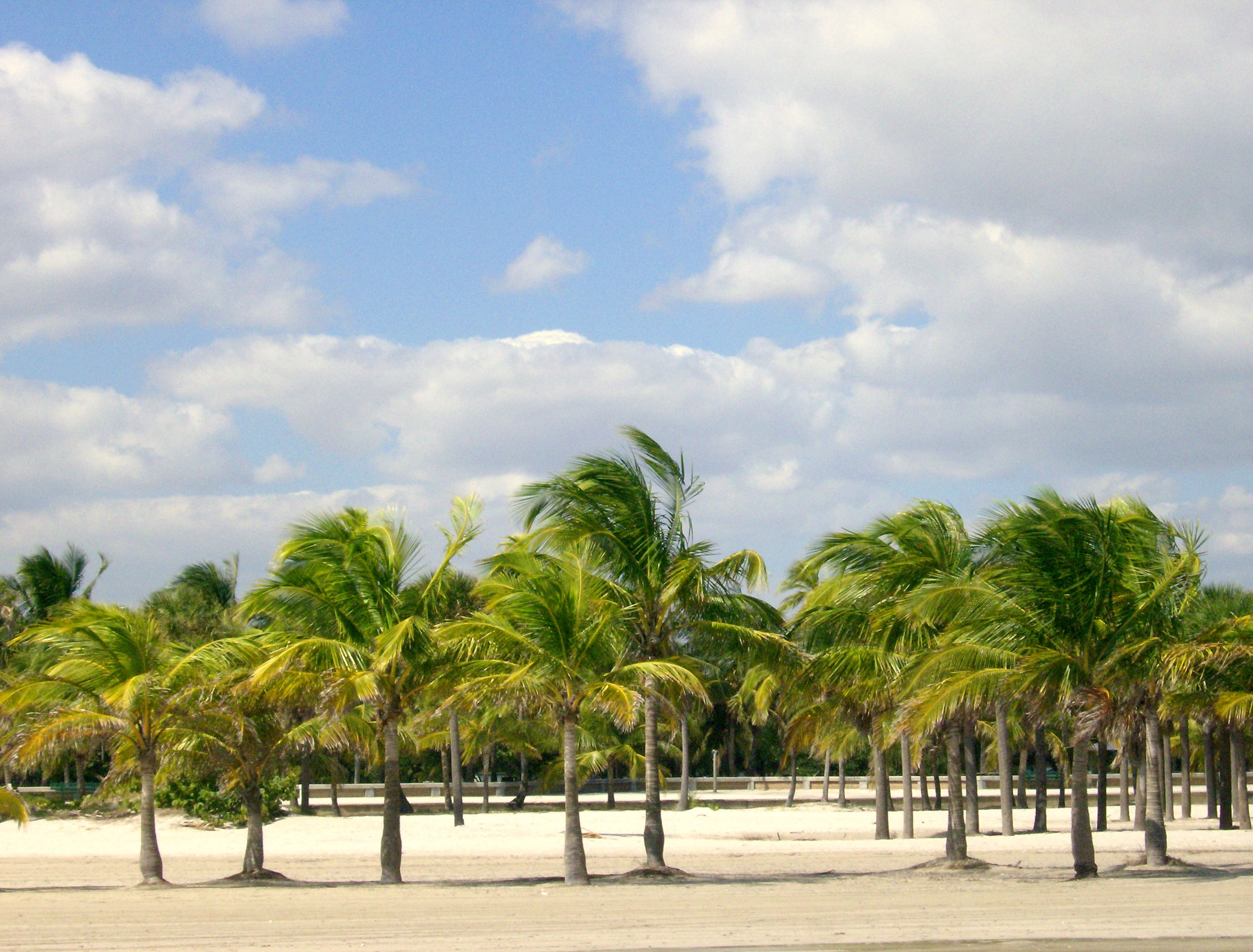
The beach at Bahia Honda in the Florida Keys, and Crandon Park in Key Biscayne.

At 345 feet (105 m) above mean sea level, Britton Hill in northern Walton County is the highest point in Florida and the lowest known highpoint of any U.S. state. Much of the state south of Orlando is low-lying and fairly level; however, some places, such as Clearwater, feature vistas that rise 50 to 100 feet (15 to 30 m) above the water. Although known for its low elevation, Florida includes a variety of distinct geographic regions. The upland ridges of central Florida, such as the Lake Wales Ridge, represent some of the oldest exposed land in the state and serve as important centers of biodiversity (Norrell & Fuson, 2025). In contrast, the coastal lowlands and barrier islands along both the Atlantic and Gulf coasts formed through more recent depositional processes and continue to shift due to waves and currents (Norrell & Fuson, 2025). This diversity contributes to the state’s unique combination of inland highlands, wetlands, and dynamic coastal environments. Much of Central and North Florida, typically 25 miles (40 km) or more away from the coastline, features rolling hills with elevations ranging from 100 to 250 feet (30 to 76 m). The most prominent topographic feature on the Florida Peninsula is the Lake Wales Ridge, a narrow sand ridge that runs north to south down the center of peninsular Florida. The highest point on the Ridge and in peninsular Florida, Sugarloaf Mountain, is a 312-foot (95 m) peak in Lake County. Much of Florida has an elevation of less than 12 feet (3.7 m), including many populated areas such as Miami which are located on the coast. Miami and other parts of south Florida are the most vulnerable regions in the world to rising sea levels associated with climate change. Due to the vast amounts of limestone bedrock that Florida sits above, water is allowed to move relatively freely beneath dry land and to rise up to the surface. Water will also likely encroach from the Atlantic Coast and the Gulf Coast, and up through the Everglades, endangering the plant biomass within its marsh communities.

Florida possessed approximately 11.4 million acres of wetlands in 1996 and nearly 29% of the state's total land area. Of these, 90% were freshwater wetlands under forested wetlands, marshes, scrub-shrub wetlands, and freshwater ponds. They play a crucial role in flood control, wildlife habitat, and groundwater recharge (Mudrey, 2011). Classification of this type benefits ecological planning and conservation within the different hydrological zones of the state.

A 2014 study found Florida to be the flattest state.

=== Boundaries ===
Florida Municipalities and Counties

The state line begins in the Atlantic Ocean, traveling west, south, and north up the thalweg of the Saint Mary's River. At the origin of that river, it then follows a straight line nearly due west and slightly north, to the point where the confluence of the Flint River (from Georgia) and the Chattahoochee River (down the Alabama/Georgia line) used to form Florida's Apalachicola River. (Since Woodruff Dam was built, this point has been under Lake Seminole.) The border with Georgia continues north through the lake for a short distance up the former thalweg of the Chattahoochee, then with Alabama runs due west along 31°N to the Perdido River, then south along its thalweg to the Gulf via Perdido Bay. Much of the state is at or near sea level. Florida is also 65,755 square miles.

=== Topography ===
Topographic map of Florida

Florida’s topography is characterized by extremely low relief, with subtle elevation changes that significantly influence water flow across the state. High-accuracy elevation mapping conducted by the U.S. Geological Survey shows that large portions of South Florida, including the Everglades, lie only a few feet above sea level, making the region one of the flattest in the United States (Desmond, 2003). Because the terrain slopes only a few centimeters per kilometer in some areas, even minor variations in elevation affect wetland distribution, hydrologic systems, and ecosystem stability (Desmond, 2003). This low-lying landscape also contributes to the state’s heightened vulnerability to flooding and sea level rise.

==== Geology ====
The Florida peninsula is a porous plateau of karst limestone sitting atop bedrock known as the Florida Platform. The emergent portion of the platform was created during the Eocene to Oligocene as the Gulf Trough filled with silts, clays, and sands. Flora and fauna began appearing during the Miocene. No land animals were present in Florida prior to the Miocene.

The largest deposits of phosphate rock in the country are found in Florida.

The geological foundation of Florida is far older than its surface sediments suggest. Its basement rocks, composed of ancient metamorphic and igneous rock, date back over 500 million years when they were a part of the supercontinent Gondwana. Through tectonic activities, the rocks migrated into Pangea and subsequently into the construction of the Florida peninsula during break-up of the supercontinent in about 200 million years ago (University of Florida IFAS, n.d.). This is the history behind the unique structural composition of the Florida Platform.

Extended systems of underwater caves, sinkholes and springs are found throughout the state and supply most of the water used by residents. Florida has more than 1,000 recognized springs, some of which occur underwater along the coastline. The limestone is topped with sandy soils deposited as ancient beaches over millions of years as global sea levels rose and fell. During the last glacial period, lower sea levels and a drier climate revealed a much wider peninsula, largely savanna. The Everglades, a wide, slow-flowing river, encompasses the southern tip of the peninsula.

These systems all contribute to Florida's water supply and many people tend to disregard the quality of the state's water. The Floridan Aquifer is one of the most productive groundwater sources in the nation for Florida's aquifer systems. The karst topography is therefore crucial. The permeability of limestone allows water to be transferred and stored effectively, but it also exposes groundwater to contamination. With little natural filtering, pollutants can enter the aquifer through surface runoff, urbanization, and agricultural operations. This has a significant impact on the water's quality.

Florida's landscape cover has experienced considerable change in the last century. Prior to 1900, much of the land was covered by forests, wetlands, and prairies. Large-scale drainage operations, agricultural land expansion, urbanization, phosphate mining, and infrastructure construction, however, significantly altered these landscapes. More recently, sea level rise and climate-related stressors have accelerated these changes, further degrading natural ecosystems (Volk et al., 2013). This dynamic history captures the enduring conflict between economic development and environmental protection. Florida’s shape has been strongly influenced by long-term fluctuations in sea level. During past glacial periods, sea level dropped significantly, exposing large portions of the continental shelf and expanding Florida’s land area (Bostick et al., 2018). Conversely, interglacial periods brought higher seas that submerged much of the peninsula, leaving only the central highlands above water (Bostick et al., 2018). These repeated cycles helped form today’s coastal plains and marine terraces.

Much of Florida’s present-day terrain results from karst processes, which occur when acidic groundwater dissolves underlying limestone. This process has produced extensive sinkholes, springs, and underground drainage networks, especially in west-central Florida (Polk et al., 2007). As a result, regions such as the Brooksville Ridge and the Withlacoochee River area contain some of the state’s most significant karst formations (Polk et al., 2007).

While there are sinkholes in much of the state, modern sinkholes have tended to be in West-Central Florida.

Florida is tied for last place (with North Dakota) as having the fewest earthquakes of any US state. Because Florida is not located near any tectonic plate boundaries, earthquakes are very rare, but not totally unknown. In January, 1879, a shock occurred near St. Augustine. There were reports of heavy shaking that knocked plaster from walls and articles from shelves. Similar effects were noted at Daytona Beach 50 miles (80 km) south. The tremor was felt as far south as Tampa and as far north as Savannah, Georgia. In January 1880, Cuba was the center of two strong earthquakes that sent severe shock waves through the city of Key West, Florida. (See List of earthquakes in Cuba) Another earthquake centered outside Florida was the 1886 Charleston earthquake. The shock was felt throughout northern Florida, ringing church bells at St. Augustine and severely jolting other towns along that section of Florida's east coast. Jacksonville residents felt many of the strong aftershocks that occurred in September, October, and November 1886. As recently as 2006, a magnitude 6.0 earthquake centered about 260 miles (420 km) southwest of Tampa in the Gulf of Mexico sent shock waves through southwest and central Florida. The earthquake was too small to trigger a tsunami and no damage was reported.

== Climate ==
The history of Florida's climate for the past 50 million years has mirrored global changes, transitioning from icehouse to greenhouse mode. The Eocene times were very warm, with tropical conditions over the Florida Platform. This was followed by periods of cooler and warmer interstage in the Miocene and Pliocene epochs, creating the region's sedimentary units and influencing oceanic biodiversity (Hine et al., 2013). These long-term paleoclimate changes also help explain modern topographical and ecological patterns in the state.

Köppen climate classification map of Florida.

The climate of Florida is tempered by the fact that no part of the state is very distant from the ocean. North of Lake Okeechobee, the prevalent climate is humid subtropical, while coastal areas south of the lake (including the Florida Keys) have a true tropical climate. Mean high temperatures for late July are primarily in the low 90s Fahrenheit (32–34 °C). Mean low temperatures for early to mid January range from the low 40s Fahrenheit (4–7 °C) in northern Florida to the mid-50s (≈13 °C) in southern Florida. According to the Florida Climate Center, May 2025 ranked as the second-warmest May on record, with statewide temperatures averaging 2–3 °F above normal. Recent years have also shown increasing drought frequency and wildfire activity, particularly in central and southern Florida (Florida Climate Center, 2025).

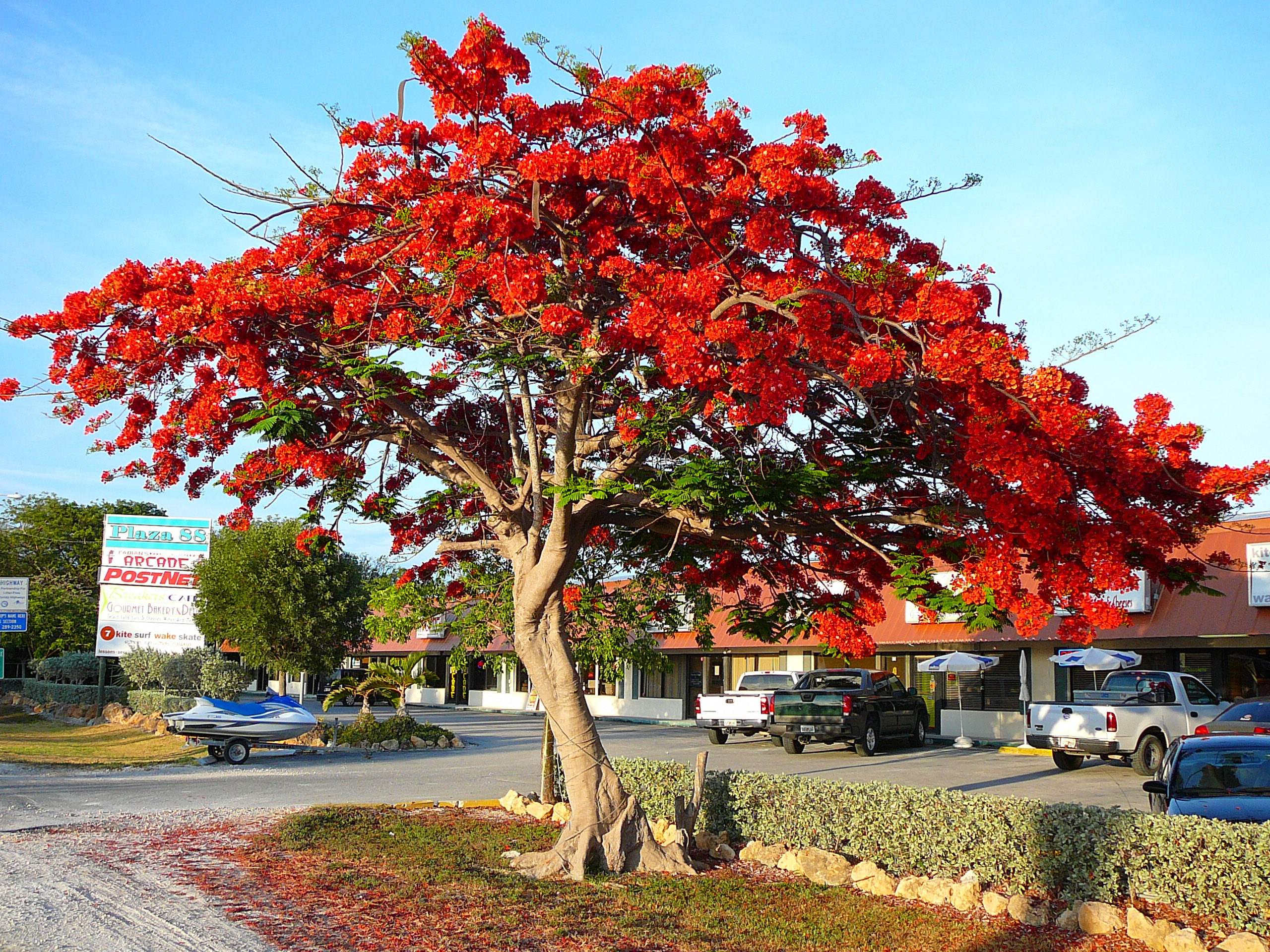
Royal Poinciana tree in full bloom in the Florida Keys, an indication of South Florida's tropical climate

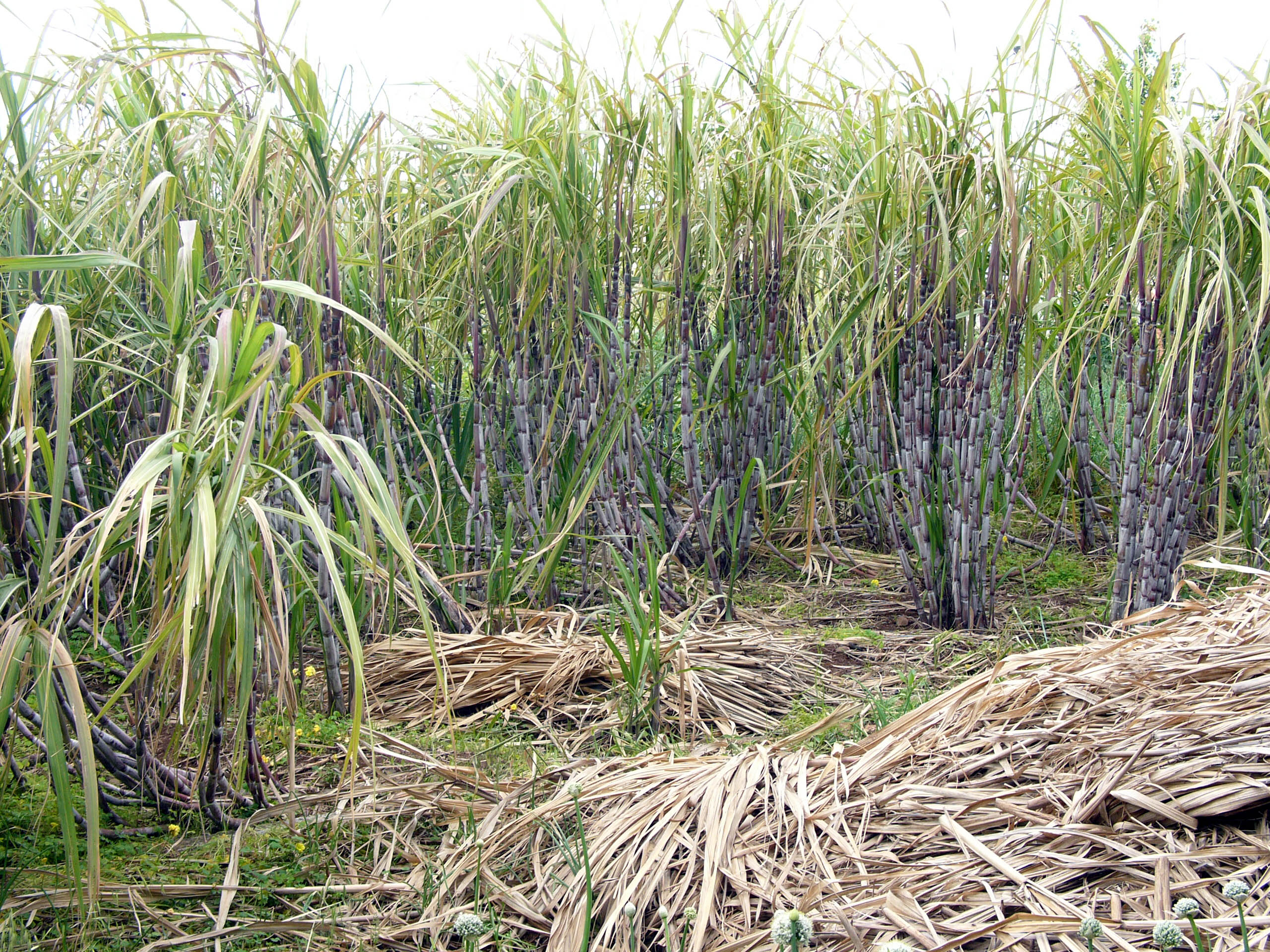
South Florida's climate is ideal for growing sugarcane.

In the summer, high temperatures in the state seldom exceed 100 °F (38 °C). During the late autumn and winter months, Florida has experienced occasional cold fronts that can bring high winds and relatively cooler temperatures for the entire state, with high temperatures that could remain into the 40s and 50s (4 to 15 °C) and lows in the 20s and 30s (−7 to 4 °C). Several record cold maxima have been in the 30s °F (−1 to 4 °C) and record lows have been in the 10s (−12 to −7 °C). These temperatures normally extend at most a few days at a time in the northern and central parts of Florida. Southern Florida, however, rarely encounters sub-freezing temperatures.

The hottest temperature ever recorded in Florida was 109 °F (43 °C), which was set on June 29, 1931, in Monticello. The coldest temperature was −2 °F (−19 °C), on February 13, 1899, just 25 miles (40 km) away, in Tallahassee. The USDA Plant hardiness zones for the state range from zone 8a (no colder than 10 °F (−12 °C) ) in the Crestview to zone 10b (no colder than 35 °F (2 °C) ) in Southeast Florida in 1990. Miami Beach and the keys are Zone 11.

In the modern era, Florida experiences one of the highest rates of relative sea level rise in the United States, with many coastal counties ranking among the nation’s most vulnerable (Office of the State Climatologist, n.d.). Rising seas increase the frequency of tidal flooding, accelerate coastal erosion, and threaten freshwater aquifers with saltwater intrusion (Office of the State Climatologist, n.d.). These impacts are particularly pronounced in South Florida, where low elevation and porous limestone amplify coastal risks.

The Everglades is a massive wetland, mangrove, and estuary system under increasing threat from climate change. Sea level rise has led to saltwater invasion into freshwater habitats-a direct change in water chemistry to threaten native species and crop viability. Higher temperatures and shifted rainfall patterns further destabilize the hydrological cycles so crucial to the Everglades' status as a freshwater reservoir for South Florida (U.S. Environmental Protection Agency, 2024). These changes contribute to increasing the necessity for measures of climate resilience in the region.

According to a 2022 report by the National Oceanic and Atmospheric Administration (NOAA), sea levels along Florida’s coastlines are projected to rise between 10 and 18 inches by 2050, increasing the likelihood of coastal flooding events.

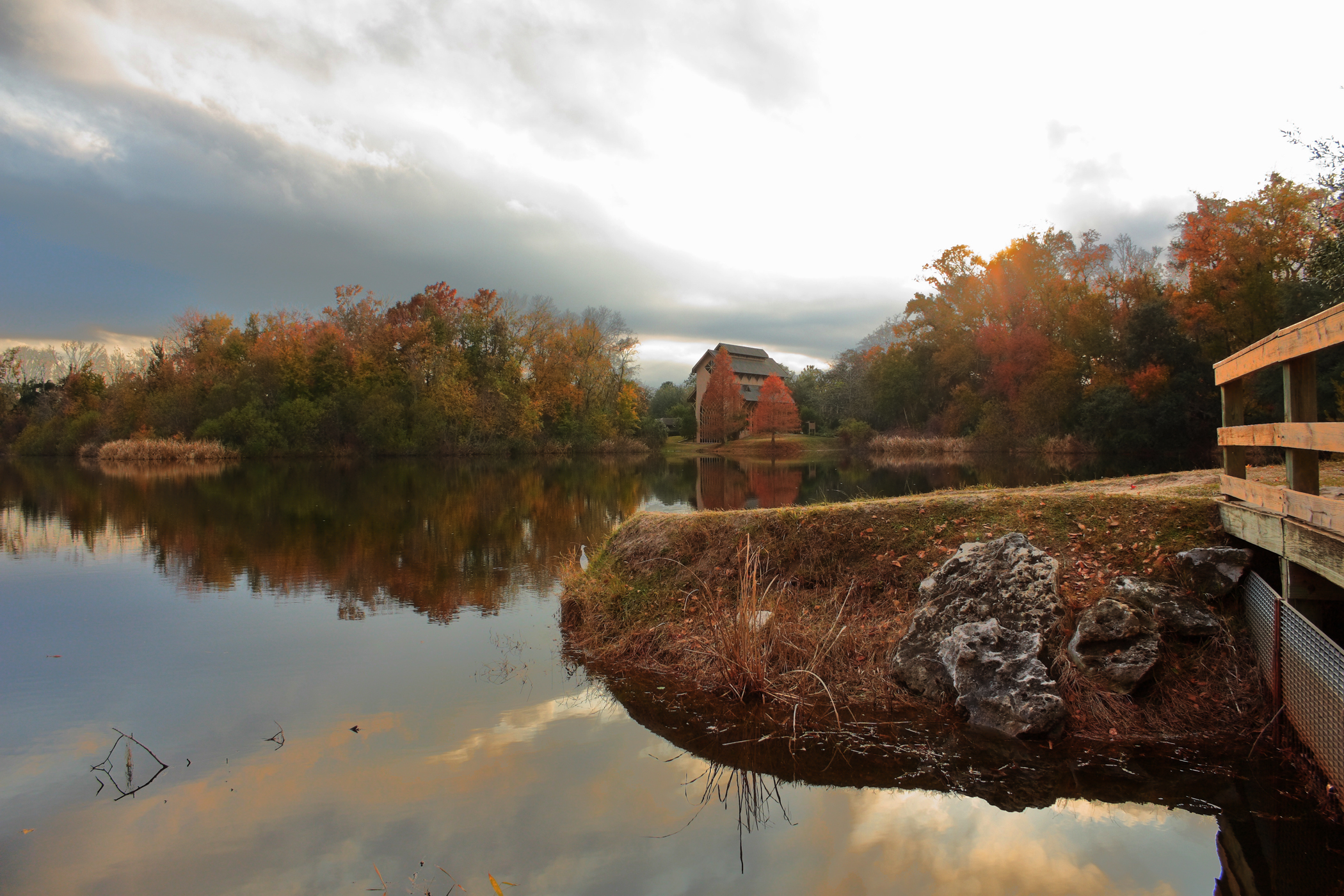
Fall foliage in North Florida

The seasons in Florida are determined more by precipitation than by temperature, with the hot, wet springs and summers making up the wet season, and mild to cool, and the relatively dry winters and autumns, making the dry season. Fall foliage appears in Central and North Florida starting around late November, and into winter. During El Niño there is greater rainfall between November and March.

At the end of El Niño in 1998, 480 wildfires occurred.

The Florida Keys, because they are completely surrounded by water, have lesser variability in temperatures. At Key West, temperatures rarely exceed 95 °F (35 °C) in the summer or fall below 55 °F (13 °C) in the winter, and frost has never been reported in the Keys.

Average high and low temperatures for various Florida cities (°F)
City	Jan	Feb	Mar	Apr	May	Jun	Jul	Aug	Sep	Oct	Nov	Dec
Jacksonville	65/43	68/45	74/50	80/56	86/64	90/70	92/73	91/73	87/70	80/61	73/51	66/44
Key West	75/65	76/66	79/69	82/72	85/76	88/78	89/80	90/80	88/78	85/76	80/71	76/67
Melbourne	72/51	73/53	77/57	81/61	85/67	88/71	90/73	90/73	88/72	83/67	78/60	73/53
Miami	76/60	77/61	80/64	83/68	86/72	88/75	90/77	90/77	88/76	85/72	81/67	77/62
Orlando	72/50	75/52	79/56	84/61	88/66	91/72	92/73	92/74	90/72	85/66	78/58	74/53
Pensacola	61/43	64/46	70/51	76/58	84/66	89/72	90/74	90/74	87/70	80/60	70/50	63/45
Tallahassee	64/40	67/42	73/48	80/53	87/62	91/69	91/72	91/72	88/68	81/57	72/47	66/41
Tampa	71/51	72/52	77/57	82/62	88/68	90/73	90/75	90/75	89/73	84/66	77/58	72/52

=== Severe weather ===
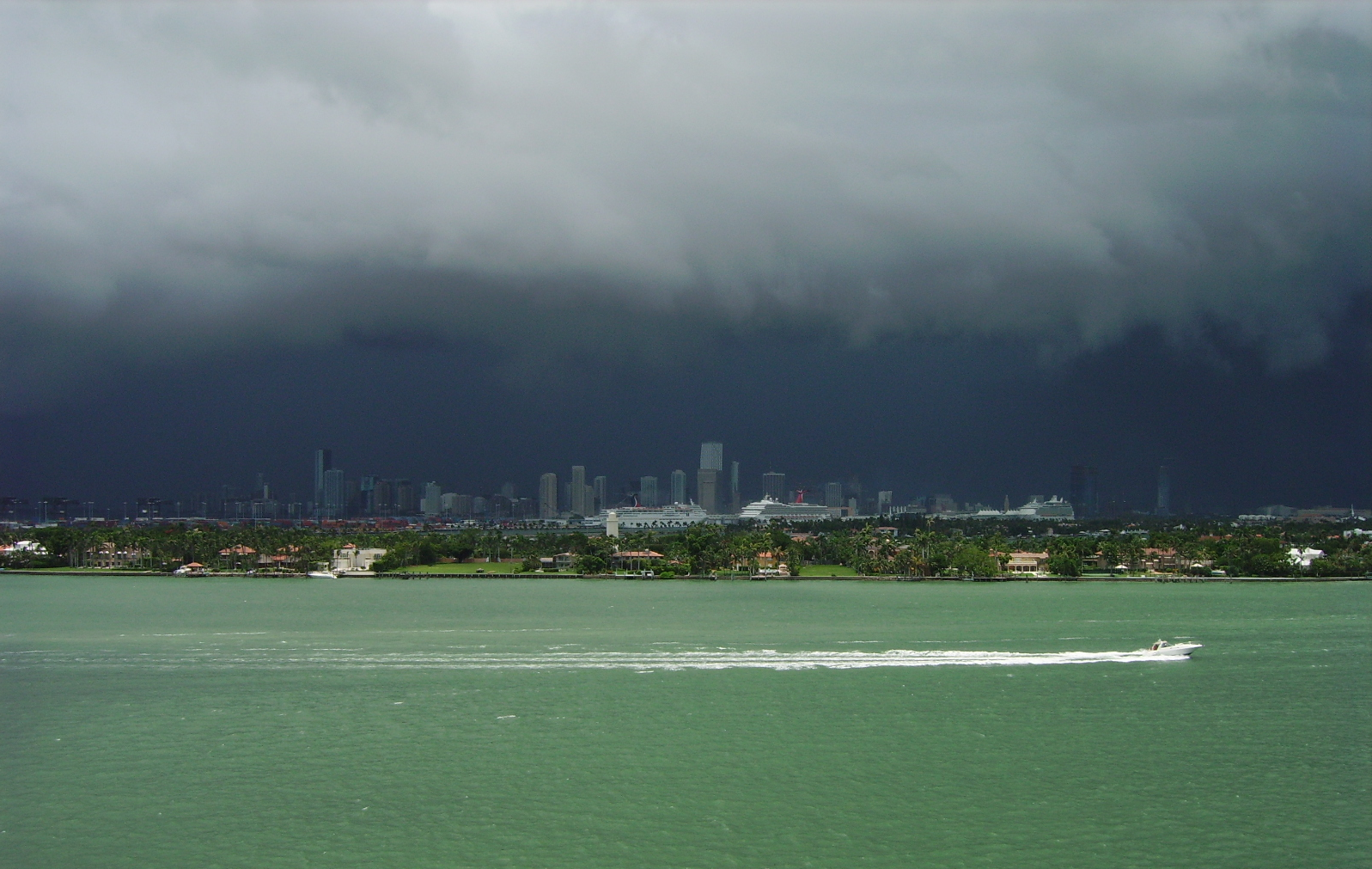
Typical summer afternoon shower from the Everglades traveling eastward over Downtown Miami

Florida's nickname is the "Sunshine State", but severe weather is a common occurrence in the state. Central Florida is known as the lightning capital of the United States, as it experiences more lightning strikes than anywhere else in the country. Florida has the highest average precipitation of any state, in large part because afternoon thunderstorms are common in most of the state from late spring until early autumn. A fair day may be interrupted with a storm, only to return to sunshine an hour or so later. These thunderstorms, caused by overland collisions of moist masses of air from the Gulf of Mexico and Atlantic Ocean, pop up in the early afternoon and can bring heavy downpours, high winds, and sometimes, tornadoes. Florida leads the United States in tornadoes per square mile (when including waterspouts), but they do not typically reach the intensity of those in the Midwest and Great Plains. Hail often accompanies the most severe thunderstorms.

A narrow eastern part of the state including Orlando and Jacksonville receives between 2,400 and 2,800 hours of sunshine annually. The rest of the state, including Miami, receives between 2,800 and 3,200 hours annually.

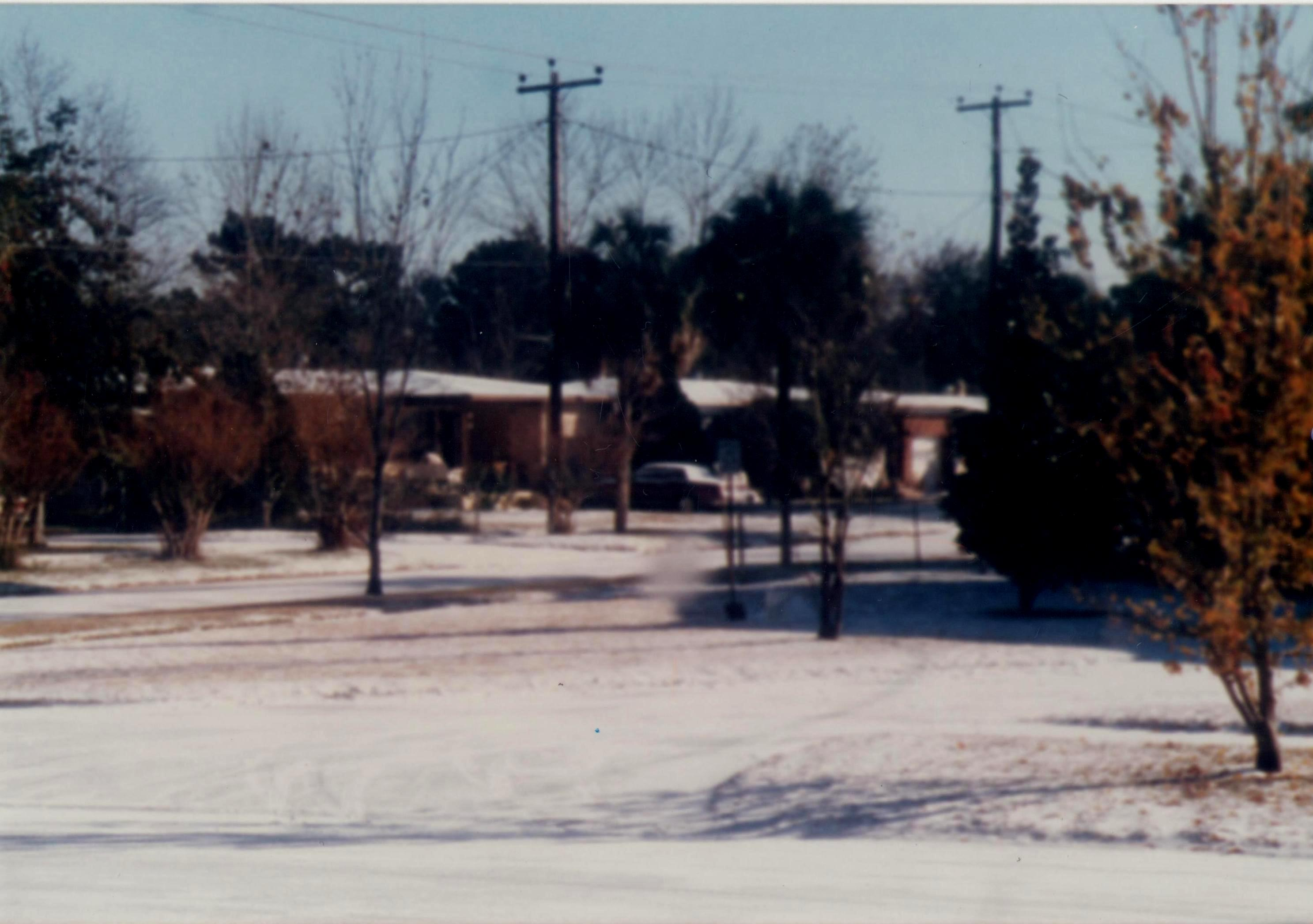
Snow is very uncommon in Florida, but has occurred in every major Florida city at least once; snow does fall very occasionally in North Florida

Snow in Florida is a rare occurrence, especially on the peninsula. During the Great Blizzard of 1899, Florida experienced blizzard conditions; the Tampa Bay area had "gulf-effect" snow, similar to lake-effect snow in the Great Lakes region. During the 1899 blizzard was the only time the temperature in Florida is known to have fallen below 0 degrees Fahrenheit (−18 °C). The most widespread snowfall in Florida history occurred on January 19, 1977, when snow fell over much of the state, with flurries as far south as Homestead. Snow flurries also fell on Miami Beach for the only time in recorded history. A hard freeze in 2003 brought "ocean-effect" snow flurries to the Atlantic coast as far south as Cape Canaveral. The 1993 Superstorm brought blizzard conditions to the panhandle, while heavy rain and tornadoes beset the peninsula. The storm is believed to have been similar in composition to a hurricane, some Gulf coast regions even seeing storm surges of six feet or more. More recently, traces of snow and sleet fell across central Florida during a hard freeze event in January, 2010. There was some slight accumulation north of the I-4 corridor, mostly in the form of sleet.

Despite Florida's rare sightings of snow since 1977, there have been small occurrences of snow that have affected the lands up north in the past 6–7 years dating from 2018-2024. The most recent sighting of snow was the statewide winter storm in 2025 that coincided with early-season snowfall in Orlando. Since it is rather uncommon in Orlando, which often experiences warm temperatures, this meteorological phenomenon was noteworthy. Many businesses and developments had to close, and Governor Ron De Santis took statewide action alerting residents to withhold any kinds of travel while the roads were cleared along with the multiple power outages in the area.

=== Hurricanes ===
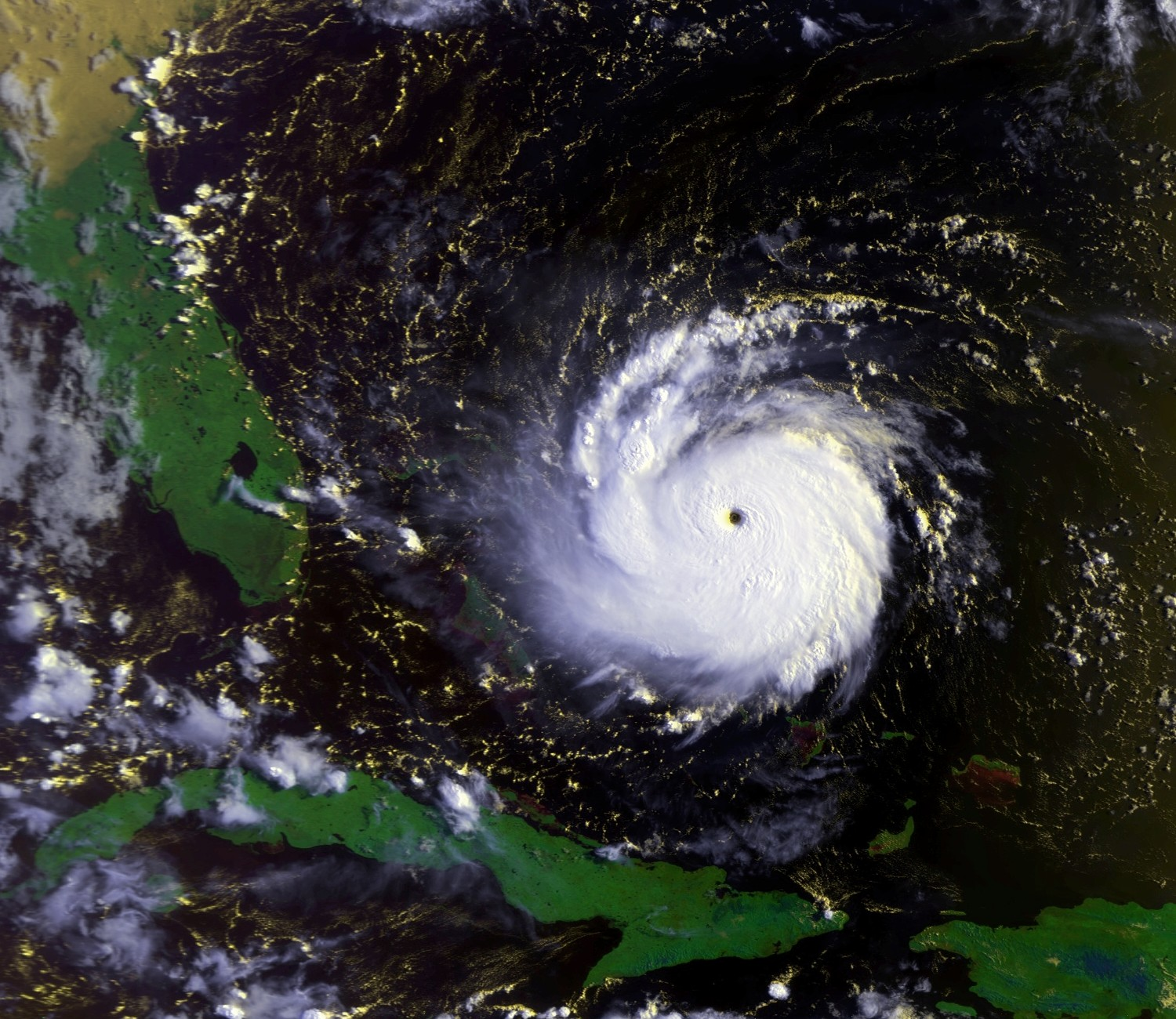
Hurricane Andrew bearing down on Florida on August 23, 1992

Hurricanes pose a severe threat during hurricane season, which lasts from June 1 to November 30, although some storms have been known to form out of season. Florida is the most hurricane-prone US state, with subtropical or tropical water on a lengthy coastline. From 1851 to 2006, Florida has been struck by 114 hurricanes, 37 of them major—category 3 and above. It is rare for a hurricane season to pass without any impact in the state by at least a tropical storm. For storms, category 4 or higher, 83% have either hit Florida or Texas. August to October is the most likely period for a hurricane in Florida.

In 2004, Florida was hit by a record four hurricanes. Hurricanes Charley (August 13), Frances (September 4–5), Ivan (September 16), and Jeanne (September 25–26) cumulatively cost the state's economy $42 billion. In 2005, Hurricane Dennis (July 10) became the fifth storm to strike Florida within eleven months. Later, Hurricane Katrina (August 25) passed through South Florida and Hurricane Rita (September 20) swept through the Florida Keys. Hurricane Wilma (October 24) made landfall near Cape Romano, just south of Marco Island, finishing another very active hurricane season. Wilma is the second most expensive hurricane in Florida history, due in part to a five-year window in which to file claims.

Florida was the site of the second costliest weather disaster in U.S. history, Hurricane Andrew, which caused more than US$25 billion in damage when it struck on August 24, 1992. In a long list of other infamous hurricane strikes are the 1926 Miami hurricane, the 1928 Okeechobee hurricane, the Labor Day Hurricane of 1935, Hurricane Donna in 1960, Hurricane Opal in 1995, and Hurricane Michael in 2018. A 2005 US government report suggests the storms are part of a natural cycle and not a result of global warming, but that report has been criticized as having been politicized.

Looking ahead of time, Hurricanes still have their tremendous effects and it has become very difficult to avoid major damages to the land. In an article about Hurricane Irma, Annie Sneed claims how "intense population growth and overdevelopment of its low-lying coastal zones" are what made Florida a great danger post Hurricane. With drastic climate changes, it puts the entire land at risk as it makes it easy to destroy all of the structures.(2017) When one looks at Miami for example, there is a lot of development on the coastline. Sneed claims that it is basically asking to get destroyed knowing they aren't strong enough to withstand hurricanes, and the population falls as collateral damage with it. Given the likelihood of storms striking Florida and the severity of their impacts, it is advised that businesses refrain from developing along the state's shore, yet they still fail to do so.

=== Fauna ===
Florida is host to many types of wildlife including:

- Marine mammals: bottlenose dolphin, short-finned pilot whale, North Atlantic right whale, West Indian manatee

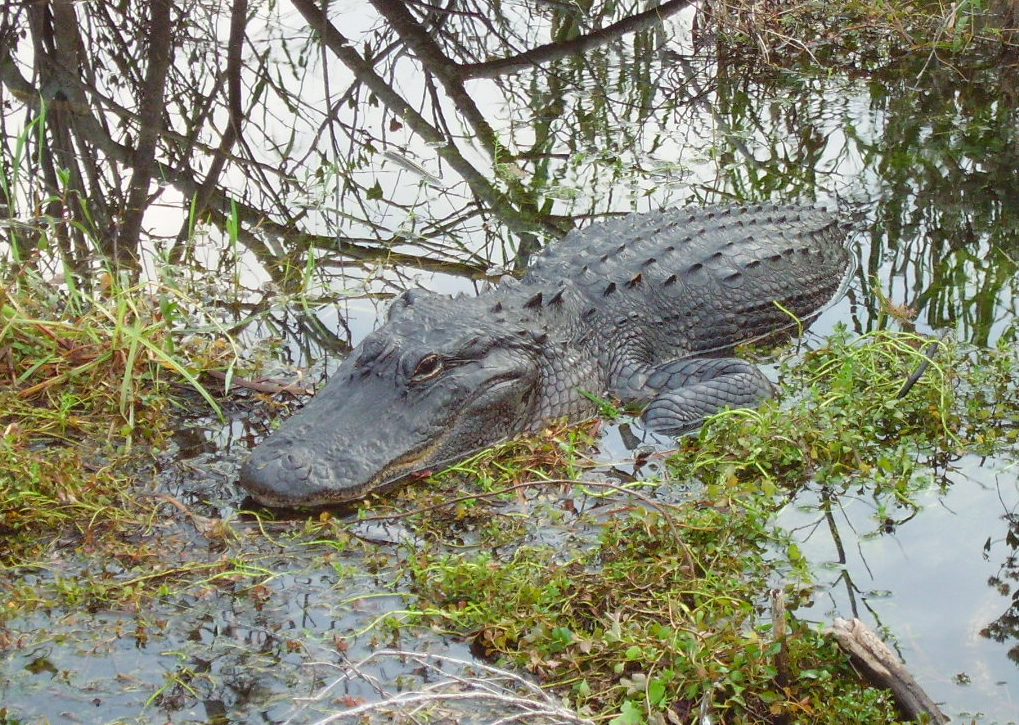
Alligator in the Florida Everglades

- Reptiles: American alligator and crocodile, eastern diamondback and pygmy rattlesnakes, gopher tortoise, green and leatherback sea turtles, eastern indigo snake

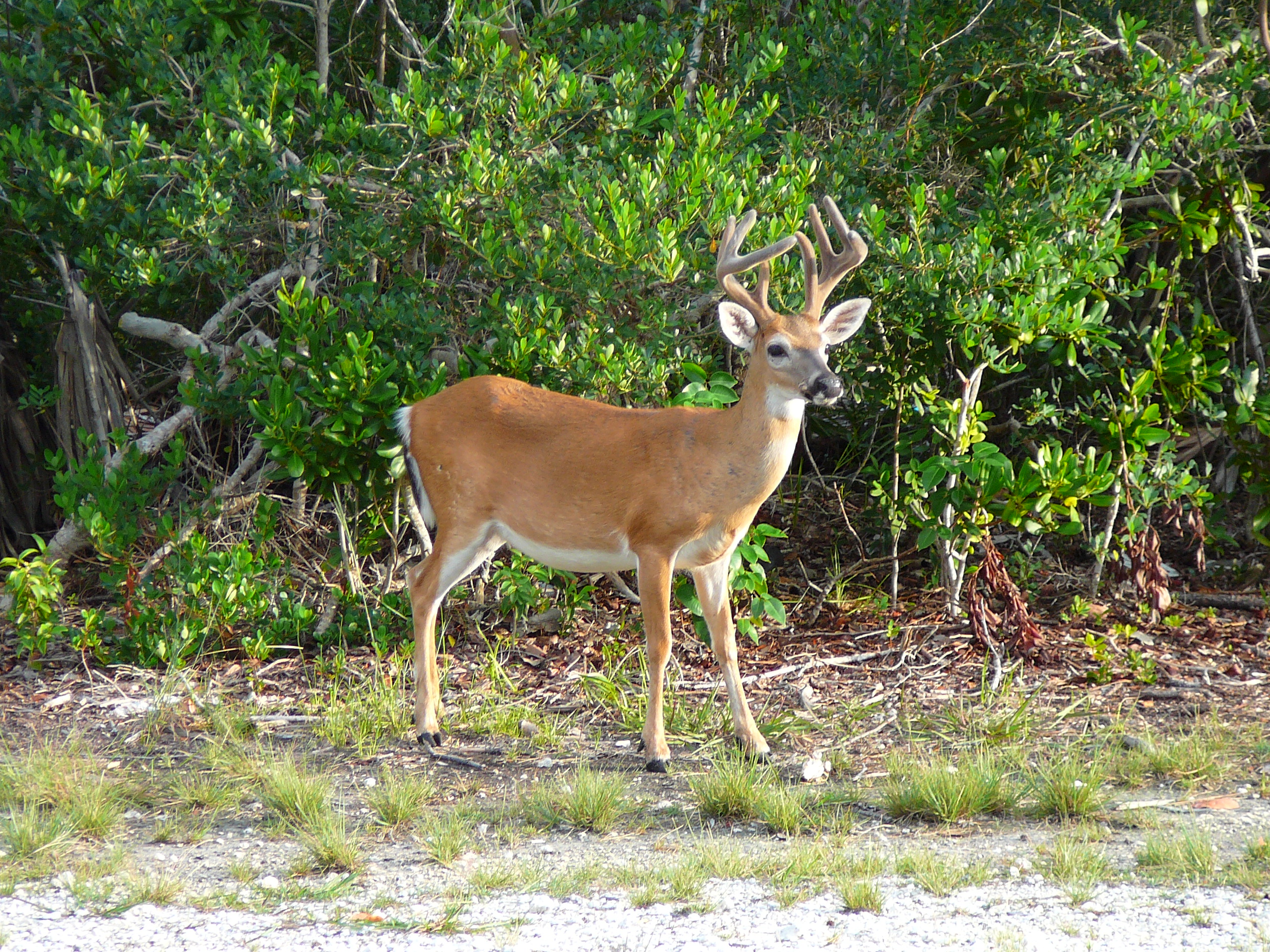
Key deer in the lower Florida Keys

- Mammals: Florida panther, northern river otter, mink, eastern cottontail rabbit, marsh rabbit, raccoon, striped skunk, squirrel, white-tailed deer, Key deer, bobcats, gray fox, coyote, wild boar, Florida black bear, nine-banded armadillos

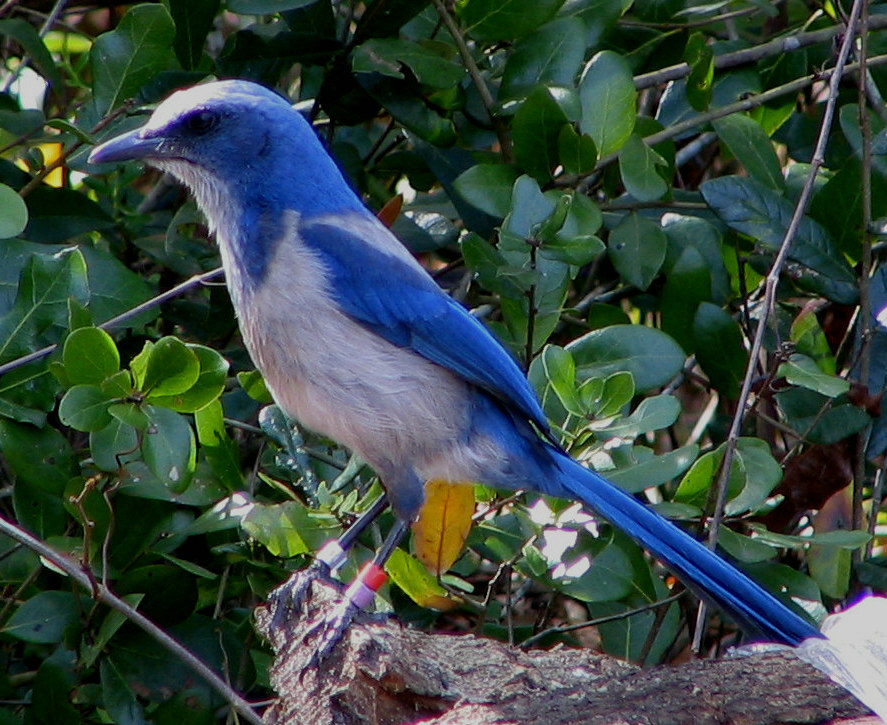
The Florida scrub jay is found only in Florida

- Birds: bald eagle, crested caracara, snail kite, osprey, white and brown pelicans, sea gulls, whooping and sandhill cranes, roseate spoonbill, Florida scrub jay (state endemic), and others. One subspecies of wild turkey, Meleagris gallopavo, namely subspecies osceola, is found only in the state of Florida. The state is a wintering location for many species of eastern North American birds.
- Invertebrates: carpenter ants, termites, and American cockroach.

The only known calving area for the northern right whale is off the coasts of Florida and Georgia.

Since their accidental importation from South America into North America in the 1930s, the red imported fire ant population has increased its territorial range to include most of the Southern United States, including Florida. They are more aggressive than most native ant species and have a painful sting.

A number of non-native snakes have been released in the wild. In 2010 the state created a hunting season for Burmese and Indian pythons, African rock pythons, green anacondas, and Nile monitor lizards.

=== Flora ===
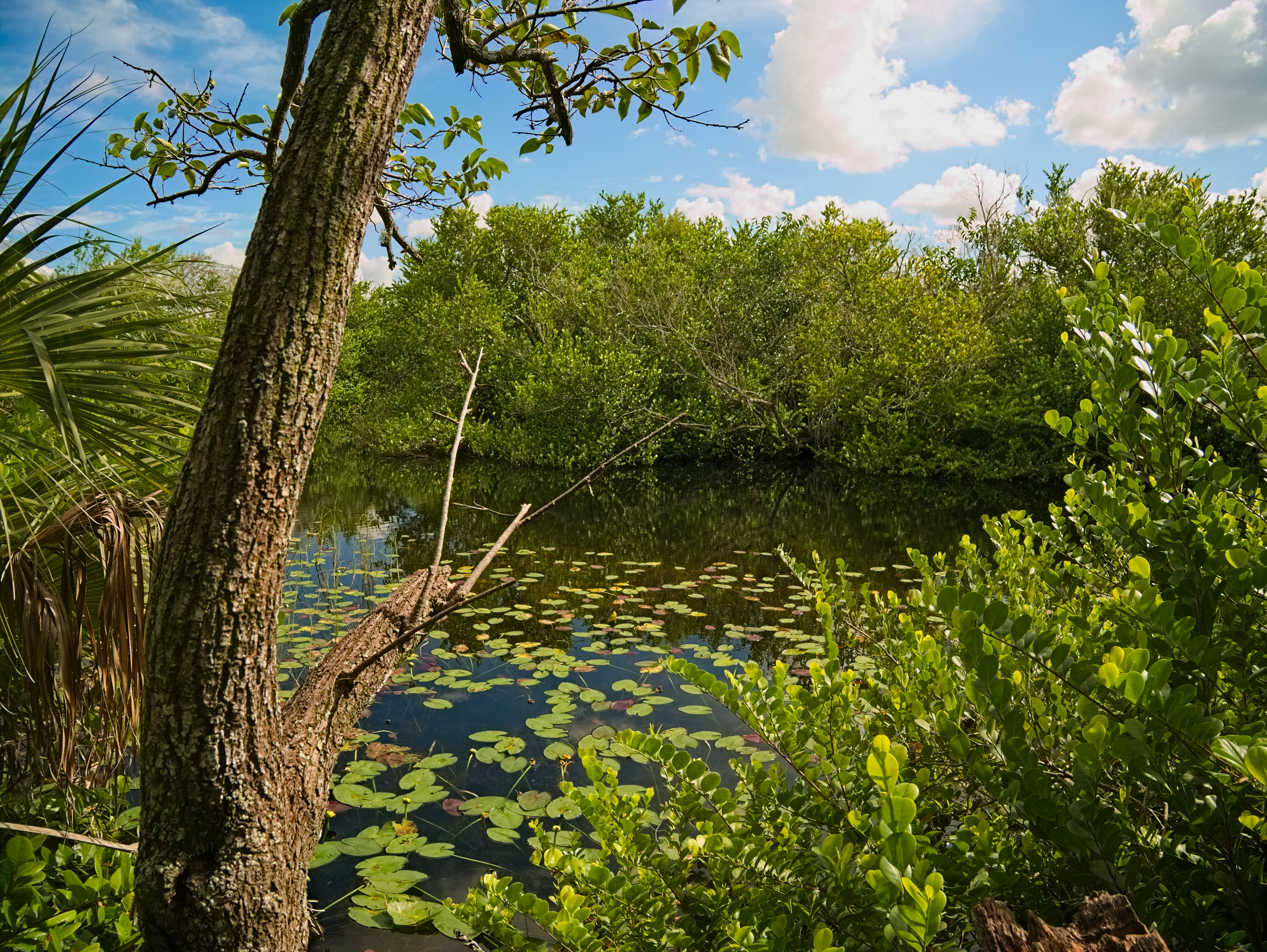
The Florida Everglades freshwater marsh system, dominated by sawgrass and other wetland vegetation

Florida's plant life (flora) is considered one of the richest and most abundant in the united States, containing a number of species surpassed only by California and Texas. Approximately 230 plants species are endemic to Florida, found nowhere else in the world. The states location between temperate and subtropical zones creates diverse conditions supporting this botanic diversity.

Florida scrub ecosystems occur on well-drained sandy soils and are characterized by sand pine, scrub oaks, saw palmetto, and Florida rosemary. The Lake Wales Ridge scrubs contained at least 40 endemic plant species, representing one of the highest concentrations of unique flora in North America outside of California, though many face endangerment from habitat loss.

Florida's mangrove forests cover approximately 600,000 acres and ar dominated by three species: red mangrove, black mangrove, and white mangrove. Red mangroves occupy the seaward edge with distinctive prop roots, while black mangroves feature pneumatophores projecting above the soil. These coastal ecosystems provide storm protection, water filtration, and critical nursery habitat for fish and wildlife.

Longleaf pine savannas and pine flatwoods historically represented Florida's most extensive ecosystems, characterized by open pine canopies with diverse ground layers dominated by wiregrass. These fire-dependent communities contain over 400 plant species and require periodic burns every three to seven years to prevent hardwood encroachment.

Sawgrass (Cladium jamaicense), despite its name a sedge rather than a grass, dominates the Everglades covering approximately 1.5 million acres and forming the characteristic "river of grass" landscape. Other marsh vegetation includes water lilies, pickerelweed, and various aquatic plants, while bald cypress and pond cypress dominate swamp communities in slightly elevated areas.

== Political geography ==
=== History ===
Florida's extensive coastline made it a perceived target during World War II, so the government built airstrips throughout the state; today, approximately 400 airports are still in service. Post World War II, Florida was involved with the Sunbelt Economic Boom. Florida is known for its warm climates all year long, along other states in the south which was why they were a part of the sunbelt. They contributed to the tremendous population increase in the south. With increasing productivity and residential growth, it can be concluded that those factors allowed many people to migrate into Florida after the war, as many citizens were thrown into exiles from many countries like Cuba and areas in the Caribbean.

== See also ==
- List of counties in Florida
- List of Florida state parks
- List of bays of Florida
