= Klein Bonaire =

Small uninhabited islet in the Caribbean Sea

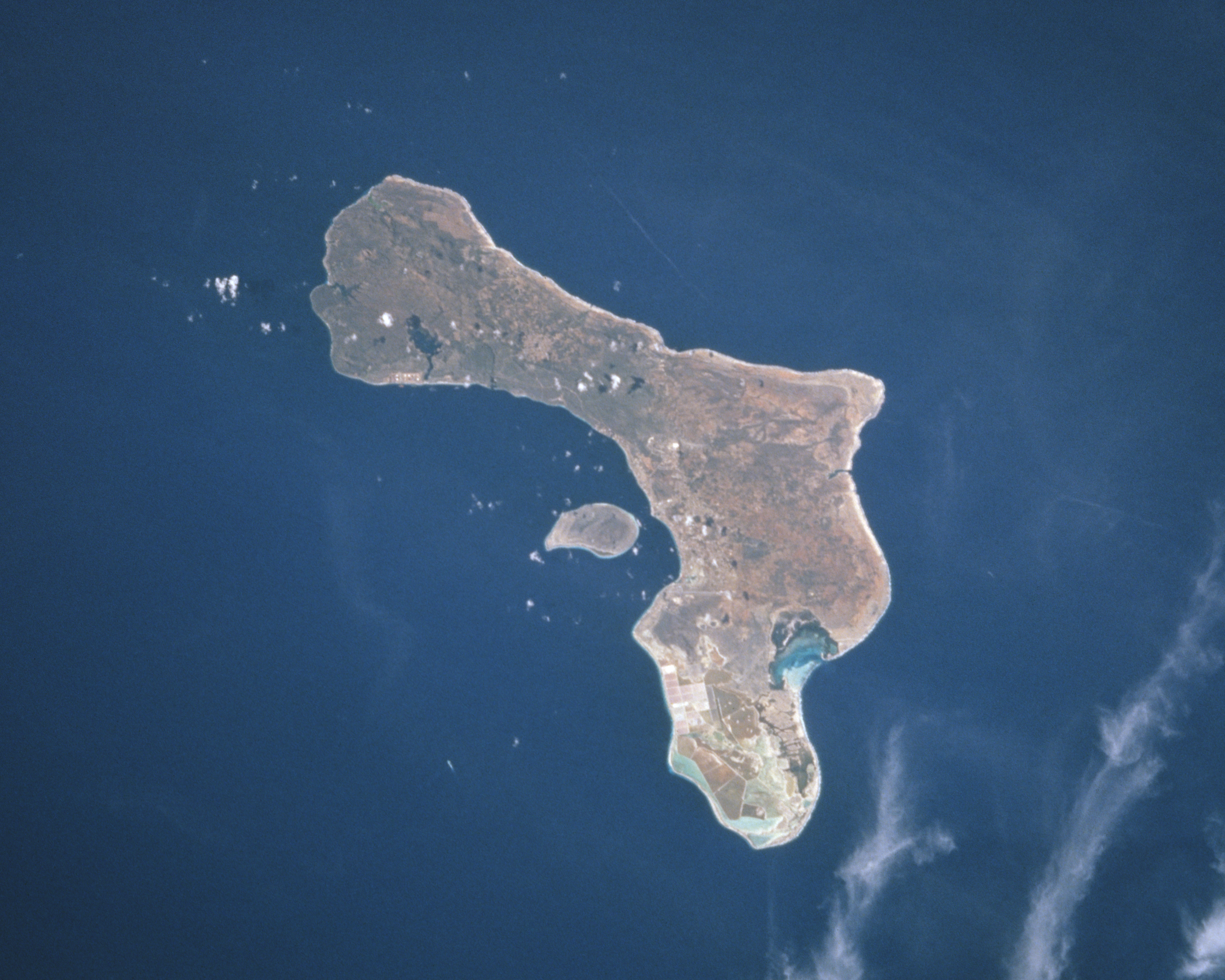
- Klein Bonaire is the somewhat oblong islet in the center of the picture, nestled in the crescent of Bonaire island.

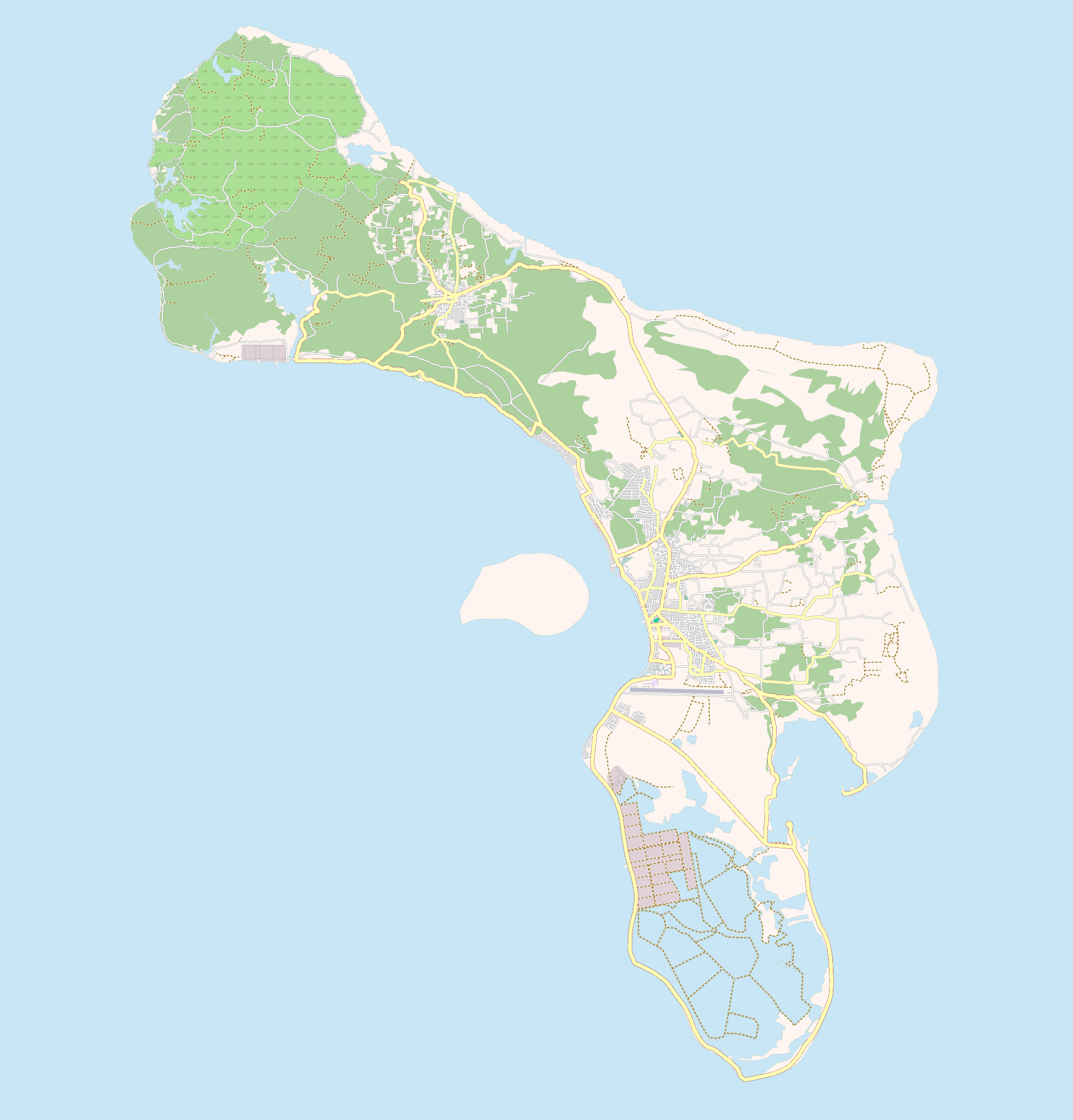
- Location within Bonaire Location within Lesser Antilles Location within the Caribbean

Geography
- Location: Caribbean
- Coordinates: 12°09′29″N 68°18′39″W
- Archipelago: Leeward Antilles, Lesser Antilles

Administration
- Netherlands
- Special municipality: Bonaire

Additional information
- Time zone: AST (UTC-4)
- Area: 6 km^{2} (2.3 sq mi)
- Established: 1980
- Website: Klein Bonaire Island & adjacent sea in Bonaire, Sint Eustatius, and Saba

Ramsar Wetland
- Official name: Klein Bonaire Island and adjacent sea
- Designated: 23 May 1980
- Reference no.: 201

Klein Bonaire (Dutch for "Little Bonaire") is a small uninhabited islet off the west coast of the Caribbean island of Bonaire, and is part of the Dutch special municipality of Bonaire.

== Geography ==
The Klein Bonaire islet, which sits within the rough crescent formed by the main island, is 6 square kilometres (1,483 acres) and extremely flat, rising no more than two meters above the sea. The only structures on the island are some ruins of slave huts (small, single-room structures dating to the region's period of slavery), and a small open shelter on the beach facing Bonaire. The island has no running water or sanitation facilities.

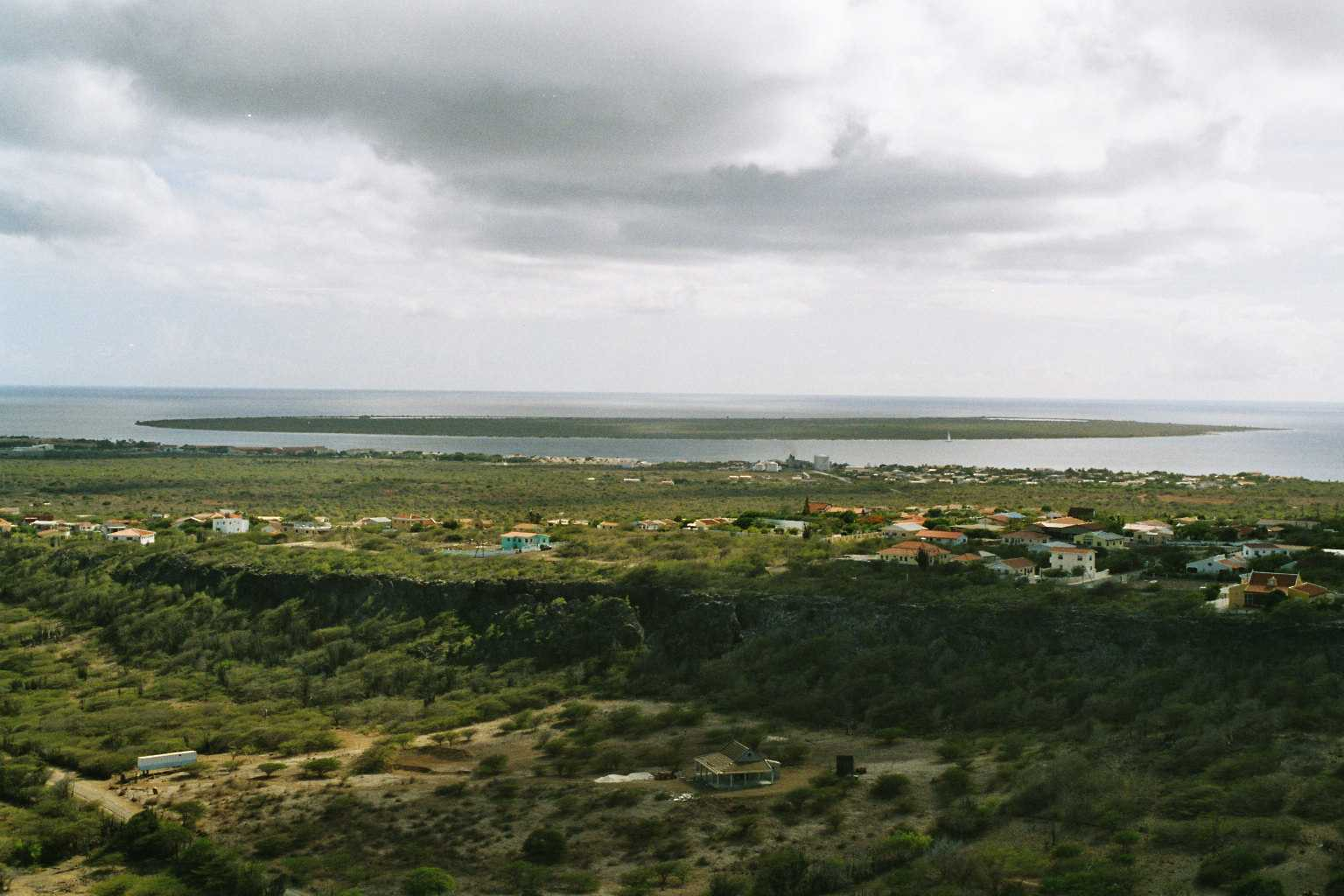
All of Klein Bonaire is visible from hills on the leeward side of Bonaire.

== History ==
In 1868, Klein Bonaire was sold to Angel Jeserun and remained in private hands until 1999. During this period the native trees were removed, resulting in a scrub growth across the island. The development of Klein Bonaire was attempted a few times prior to its establishment as a marine preserve, the last unsuccessful attempt being in 1995.

Concerned locals rallied to save Klein Bonaire and raise funds to do so and The Foundation for the Preservation of Klein Bonaire (FPKB) was born. Through efforts of the FPKB and other concerned parties, and with monies from the Department of the Interior and Kingdom Affairs of the Netherlands, the World Nature Fund of the Netherlands and FPKB, the island was successfully purchased in 1999 for 9 million Netherlands Antillean guilder (US$5 million).

Klein Bonaire is now part of the Bonaire National Marine Park. Long-term plans include reintroduction of the native vegetation.

== Flora and fauna ==
Klein Bonaire is permanently home to green (Chelonia mydas) and hawksbill sea turtles (Eretmochelys imbricata). During the nesting season it is also home to loggerhead sea turtles (Caretta caretta) and occasional flamingos.

Montastraea annularis was the most common coral seen during a recent 2011 survey.

=== Birds ===
Klein Bonaire has been identified by BirdLife International as an Important Bird Area (IBA) because it supports populations of threatened or restricted-range bird species, including bare-eyed pigeons, least terns and Caribbean elaenias. It is also a breeding site for Wilson's and snowy plovers.

== Tourism ==
The distance from the shore of Bonaire to the shore of Klein Bonaire is about 800 metres (0.50 miles) at the nearest point. This span is frequently traversed by private and commercial boats and can be done by kayak with some difficulty. The primary attraction for visitors is scuba diving and snorkeling the pristine coral reef surrounding the islet. Numbered yellow painted rocks near the open shelter show where divers can cross low points on the reef, which is very close to the beach. When facing the water at the rocks the current runs from right to left.

== Gallery ==
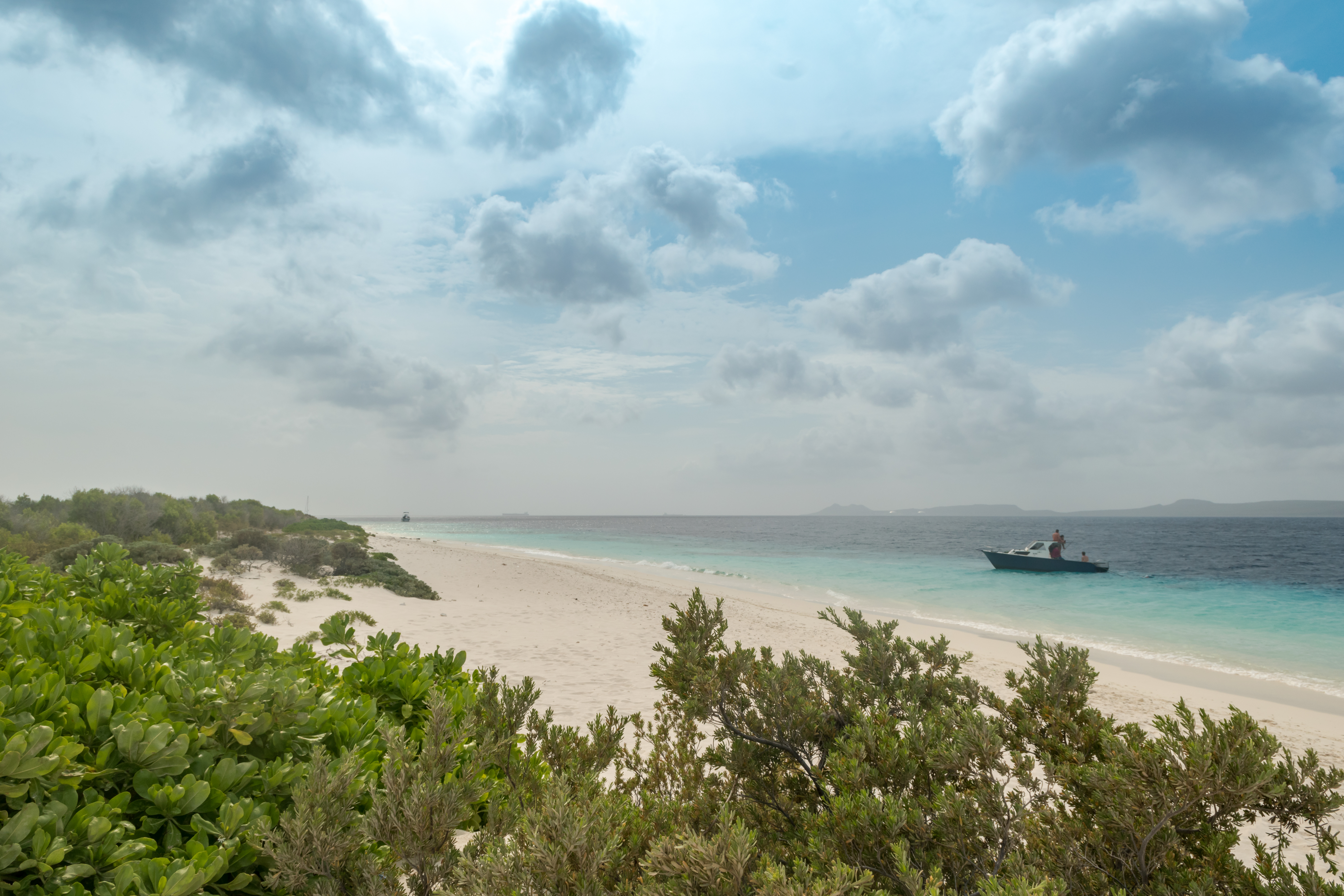
Klein Bonaire beach

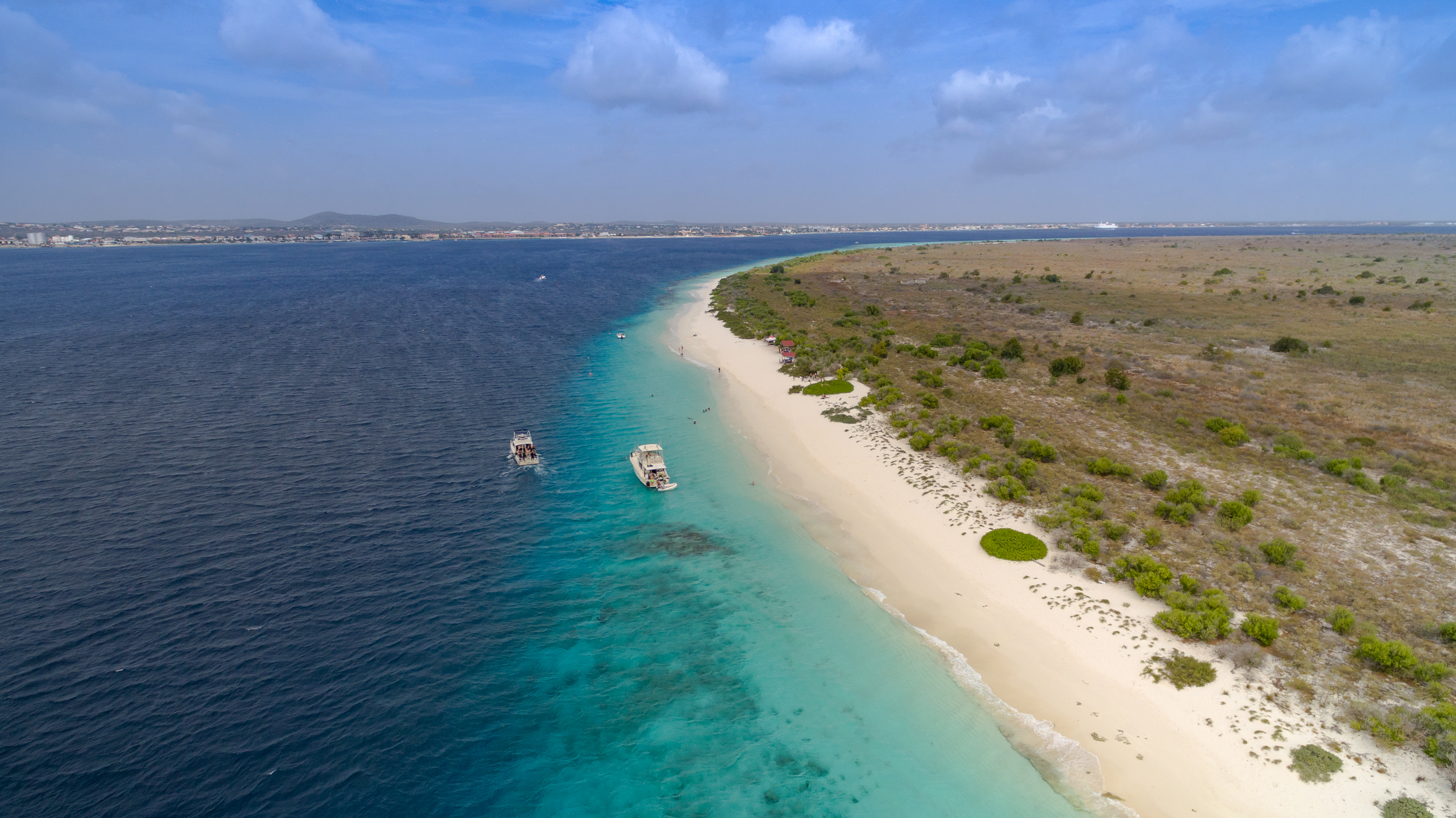
Aerial view of Klein Bonaire beach

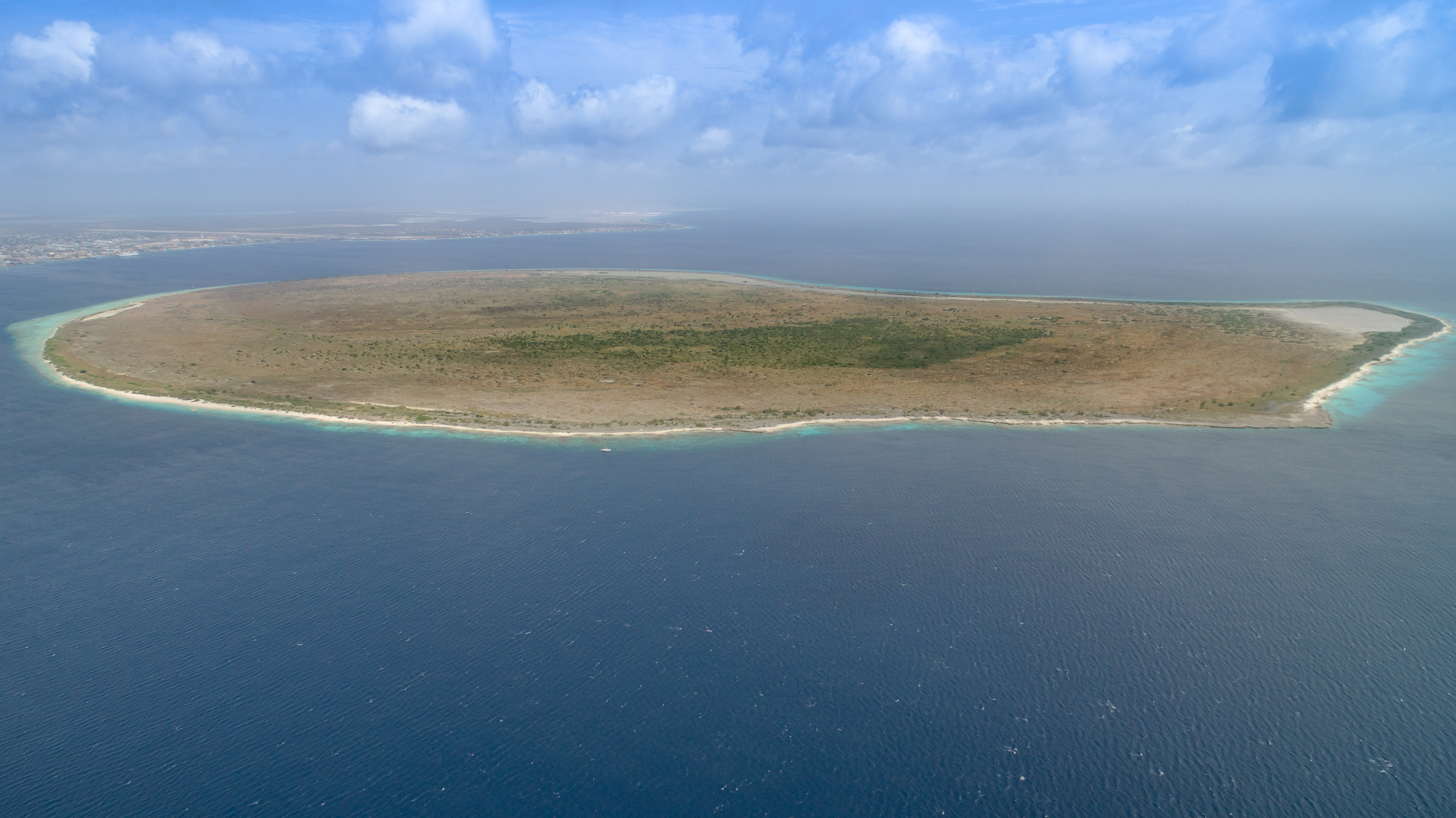
Aerial view of Klein Bonaire

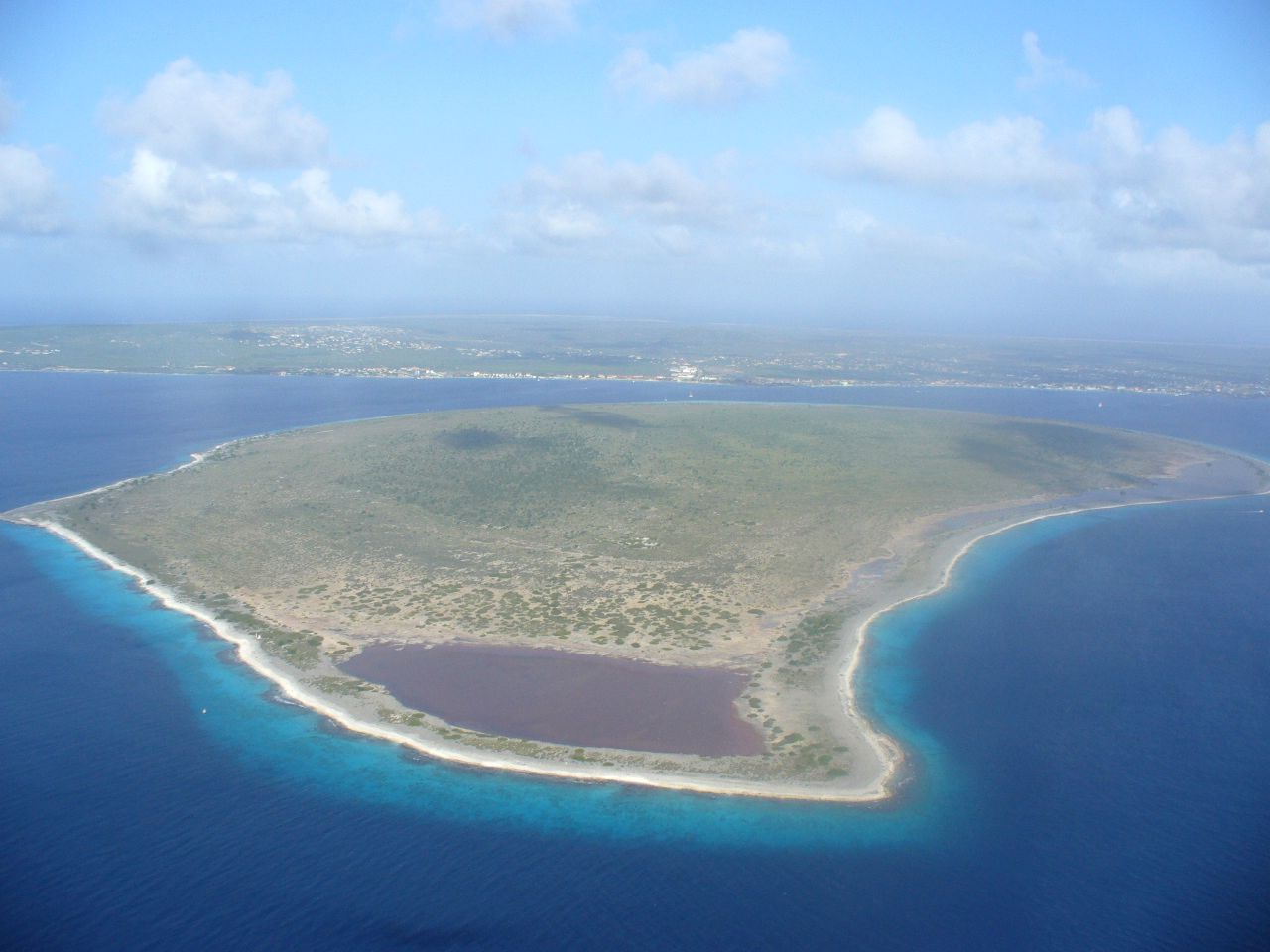
Another aerial view with Bonaire in the background

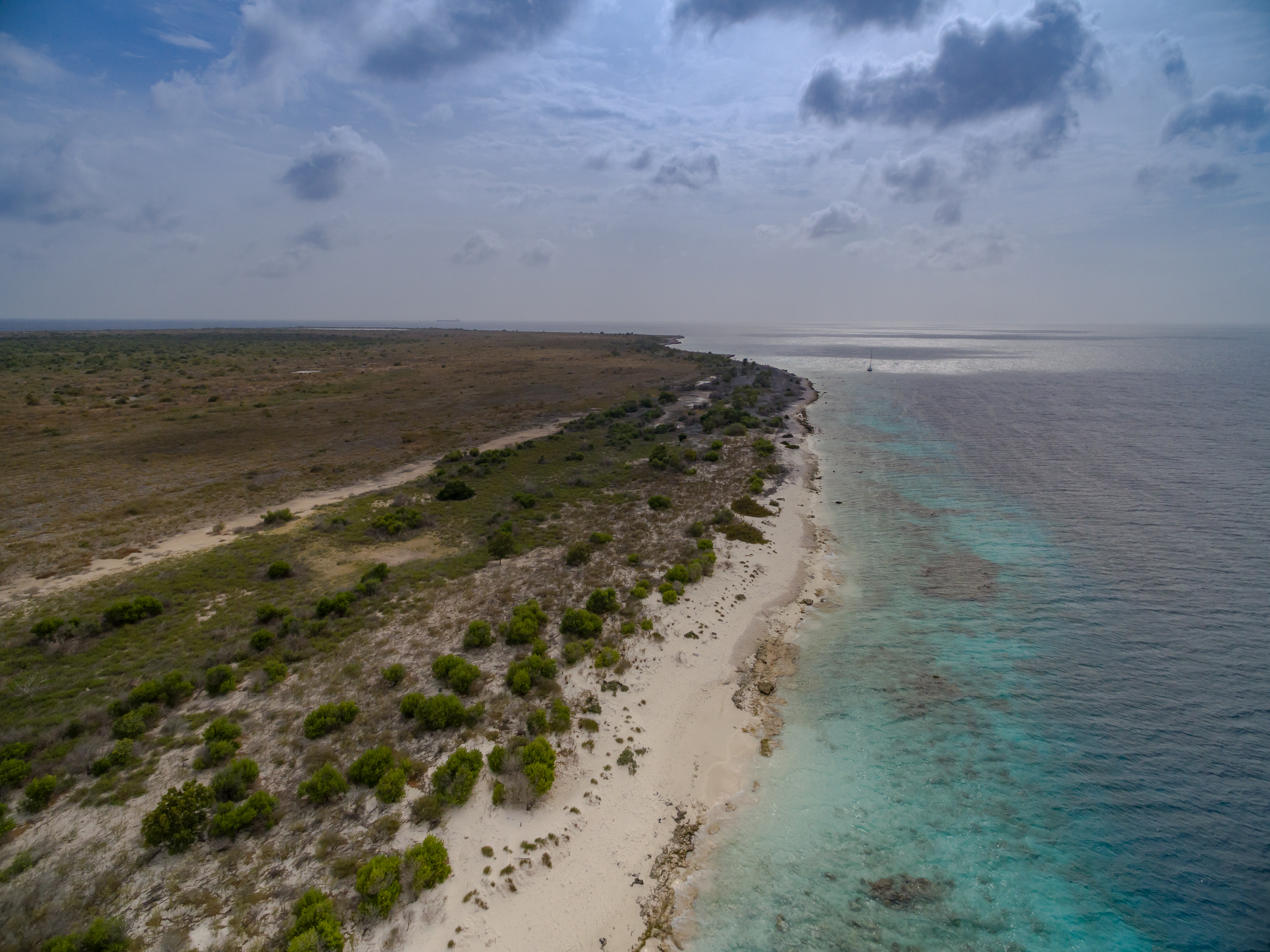
Klein Bonaire

== See also ==
- Bonaire National Marine Park
