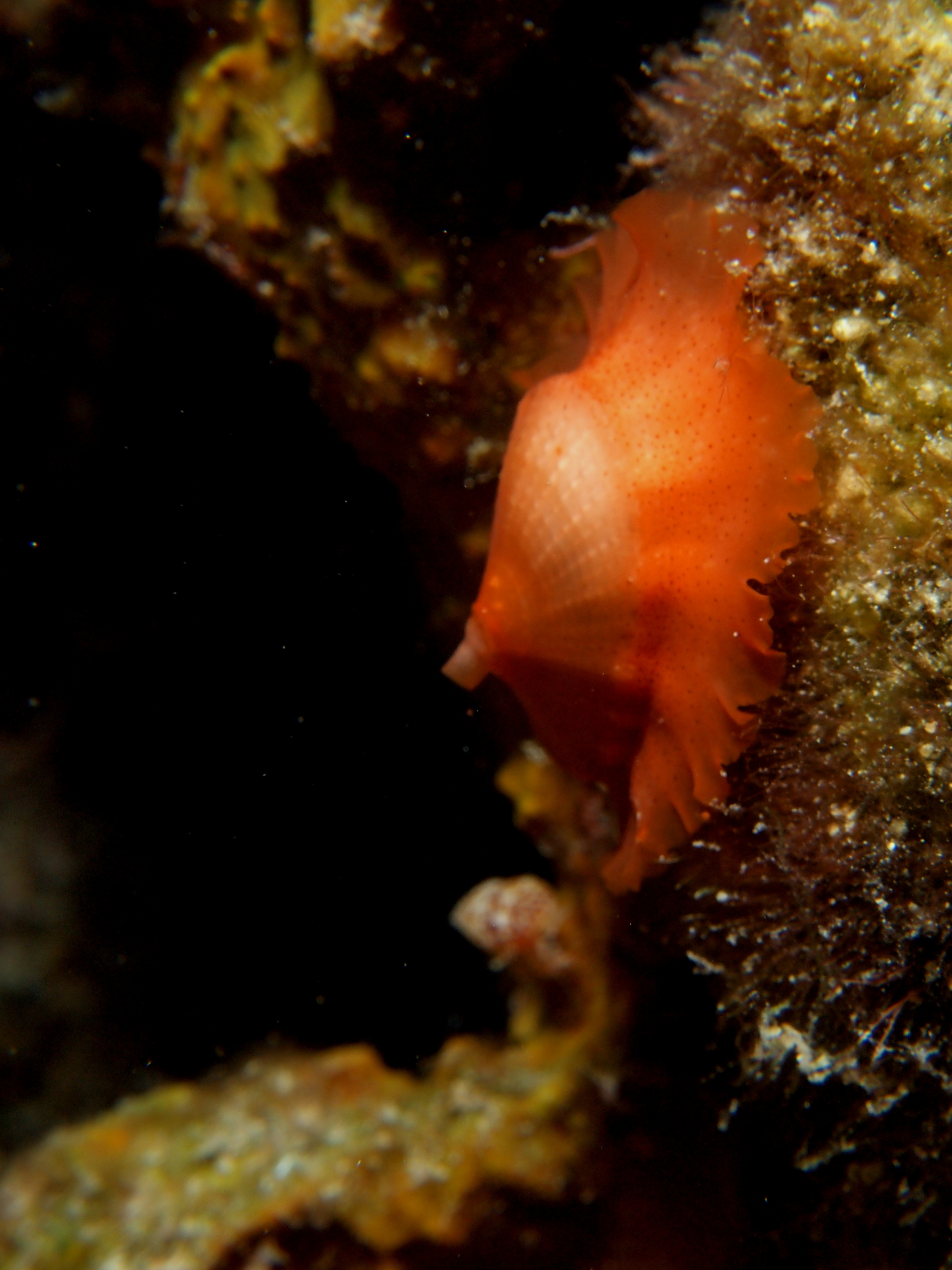
- Lucapina adspersa, photographed in the Bonaire National Marine Park in 2011.

Scientific classification
- Kingdom: Animalia
- Phylum: Mollusca
- Class: Gastropoda
- Subclass: Vetigastropoda
- Order: Lepetellida
- Family: Fissurellidae
- Genus: Lucapina
- Species: L. adspersa

Binomial name
- Lucapina adspersa (Philippi, 1845)

= Lucapina adspersa =

Species of gastropod

Lucapina adspersa is a species of sea snail, a marine gastropod mollusk in the family Fissurellidae, the keyhole limpets.
