= Red mangrove =

Red mangrove may refer to at least three plant species:

- Rhizophora mangle
- Rhizophora mucronata
- Rhizophora stylosa
