= White mangrove =

White mangrove may refer to several species of plants, including:

- Avicennia marina, occurring around the Indian Ocean and into the western Pacific Ocean as far as New Zealand
- Laguncularia racemosa, occurring on both sides of the Atlantic Ocean and along the eastern edge of the Pacific Ocean
