= Black mangrove =

Black mangrove may refer to the plants:

- Aegiceras corniculatum (Primulaceae) – south-east Asia and Australasia
- Avicennia germinans (Acanthaceae) – tropical and subtropical regions of the Americas, on both the Atlantic and Pacific coasts, and on the Atlantic coast of tropical Africa
- Bruguiera gymnorhiza (Rhizophoraceae) – tropical and subtropical coasts of eastern Africa, Indian Ocean, Asia, Australasia and western Pacific
- Lumnitzera spp. (Combretaceae) – eastern Africa, Asia, Australasia and western Pacific
