= Cola verticillata =

Scientific classification
- Kingdom: Plantae
- Clade: Embryophytes
- Clade: Tracheophytes
- Clade: Spermatophytes
- Clade: Angiosperms
- Clade: Eudicots
- Clade: Rosids
- Order: Malvales
- Family: Malvaceae
- Genus: Cola
- Species: C. verticillata

Binomial name
- Cola verticillata (Thonn.) Stapf ex A.Chev.

Synonyms
- Sterculia verticillata Thonn.

Species of plant

Cola verticillata is a species of tree in the genus Cola, of the family Malvaceae, native to the forests of tropical Africa. Common names include owe cola, slippery cola and mucilage cola. It was first described by the Danish botanist Peter Thonning as Sterculia verticillata, and was given its current name of Cola verticillata by the Austrian botanist Otto Stapf and the French botanist Auguste Chevalier.

== Description ==
Cola verticillata is a medium-sized tree, up to 25 m (80 ft) in height, the lower third of the trunk being devoid of branches. It has evergreen, oval, glossy leaves arranged in whorls of three or four, and panicles of starlike, cream-coloured flowers with purplish-brown striations growing in the leaf axils. The fruits are similar in appearance to the kola nuts of Cola acuminata but are very bitter, and considered inedible.

== Distribution and habitat ==
Cola verticillata is native to tropical West Central Africa; its range includes Ghana, Benin, Nigeria, Cameroon, Central African Republic, Gabon, Republic of the Congo, Democratic Republic of the Congo and Angola. It grows in lowland forests, at altitudes of up to 1,000 m (3,300 ft), particularly near streams and in swamps.

== Ecology ==
The kola weevil (Balanogastris kolae) damages cultivated kola nuts. The weevil is also attracted to, and successfully breeds on, C. verticillata and Cola nitida; these widely distributed wild Cola species may maintain populations of weevils even when cultivated species are unavailable locally.

== Uses ==
The timber of Cola verticillata is hard and white; in southern Nigeria it is used to make fetish images. The trees are sometimes planted in villages, the nuts, which contain significant amounts of caffeine, being gathered from the wild when ripe and used to make a drink.
