= Cola rostrata =

Scientific classification
- Kingdom: Plantae
- Clade: Tracheophytes
- Clade: Angiosperms
- Clade: Eudicots
- Clade: Rosids
- Order: Malvales
- Family: Malvaceae
- Genus: Cola
- Species: C. rostrata

Binomial name
- Cola rostrata K.Schum.

Species of flowering plant

Cola rostrata is a species of flowering plant in the family Malvaceae, commonly known as monkey cola or cockroach cola. It is a tree found in the tropical rainforests of Cameroon, Nigeria and Gabon.

== Description ==
Cola rostrata is a tree growing to a height of about 50 ft (15 m) with a broad crown. The leaves are palmately compound, with five to seven leaflets with elongated tips. The insides of the flowers are creamy yellow.

== Distribution and habitat ==
Cola rostrata is native to southeastern Nigeria, southern Cameroon and Gabon. It is a tropical lowland rainforest tree.

== Uses ==
Cola rostrata has sweet edible fruits, enjoyed by humans and also appreciated by monkeys, baboons and other primates. The edible part is the aril, the white fleshy mesocarp; the large, rough, brown, flattened seeds are not edible, unlike the seeds of the closely related cola nut (Cola nitida). The plant is not known to have traditional uses as a herbal remedy, but many members of the genus Cola do have pharmacological properties, and the plant was screened for potential drugs. An extract of the root bark was found to contain flavonoids, phenols, saponins, steroids, tannins and triterpenoids but no alkaloids. Triterpenoids are complex oils that may have interesting pharmacological activity. Saponins are haemolytic and tend to be toxic, but toxicological tests on the extract did not show toxicity when fed to mice.
