= Cola umbratilis =

Conservation status
- Vulnerable (IUCN 2.3)

Scientific classification
- Kingdom: Plantae
- Clade: Tracheophytes
- Clade: Angiosperms
- Clade: Eudicots
- Clade: Rosids
- Order: Malvales
- Family: Malvaceae
- Genus: Cola
- Species: C. umbratilis

Binomial name
- Cola umbratilis Brenan & Keay

Species of tree

Cola umbratilis is a species of tropical rainforest tree in the family Malvaceae. It is endemic to the wet evergreen forests of Côte d'Ivoire and Ghana where it is threatened by habitat loss.
