= Cola octoloboides =

Conservation status
- Endangered (IUCN 3.1)

Scientific classification
- Kingdom: Plantae
- Clade: Tracheophytes
- Clade: Angiosperms
- Clade: Eudicots
- Clade: Rosids
- Order: Malvales
- Family: Malvaceae
- Genus: Cola
- Species: C. octoloboides

Binomial name
- Cola octoloboides Brenan

Species of flowering plant

Cola octoloboides is a species of flowering plant in the family Malvaceae. It is found only in Kenya. It is currently threatened by habitat loss.
