= Newtonia erlangeri =

Conservation status
- Endangered (IUCN 3.1)

Scientific classification
- Kingdom: Plantae
- Clade: Tracheophytes
- Clade: Angiosperms
- Clade: Eudicots
- Clade: Rosids
- Order: Fabales
- Family: Fabaceae
- Subfamily: Caesalpinioideae
- Clade: Mimosoid clade
- Genus: Newtonia
- Species: N. erlangeri

Binomial name
- Newtonia erlangeri (Harms) Brenan

Species of legume

Newtonia erlangeri is a species of plant in the family Fabaceae. It is found in Kenya, Somalia, and Tanzania.
