= Cola philipi-jonesii =

Conservation status
- Endangered (IUCN 2.3)

Scientific classification
- Kingdom: Plantae
- Clade: Tracheophytes
- Clade: Angiosperms
- Clade: Eudicots
- Clade: Rosids
- Order: Malvales
- Family: Malvaceae
- Genus: Cola
- Species: C. philipi-jonesii

Binomial name
- Cola philipi-jonesii Brenan & Keay

Species of flowering plant

Cola philipi-jonesii is a species of flowering plant in the family Malvaceae. It is found only in Nigeria. It is threatened by habitat loss.
