= Cola porphyrantha =

Conservation status
- Critically Endangered (IUCN 3.1)

Scientific classification
- Kingdom: Plantae
- Clade: Tracheophytes
- Clade: Angiosperms
- Clade: Eudicots
- Clade: Rosids
- Order: Malvales
- Family: Malvaceae
- Genus: Cola
- Species: C. porphyrantha

Binomial name
- Cola porphyrantha Brenan

Species of flowering plant

Cola porphyrantha is a species of flowering plant in the family Malvaceae. It is found only in Kenya.
