= Newtonia paucijuga =

Conservation status
- Near Threatened (IUCN 3.1)

Scientific classification
- Kingdom: Plantae
- Clade: Tracheophytes
- Clade: Angiosperms
- Clade: Eudicots
- Clade: Rosids
- Order: Fabales
- Family: Fabaceae
- Subfamily: Caesalpinioideae
- Clade: Mimosoid clade
- Genus: Newtonia
- Species: N. paucijuga

Binomial name
- Newtonia paucijuga (Harms) Brenan

Species of legume

Newtonia paucijuga is a species of flowering plant in the family Fabaceae. It is found in Kenya and Tanzania.

== Description ==
Newtonia hildebrandtii is a fairly large tree growing to a height of about 35 m (110 ft). The trunk is usually smooth and some shade of grey or greyish brown, and the small twigs are densely covered with reddish-brown hairs when young. The leaves are alternate and bi-pinnate, up to 4 cm (2 in) long, each leaf having one or two pairs of pinnae, and each pinna having two to three pairs of leaflets. There is a short gland between each pair of pinnae and further short glands between each pair of leaflets. The leaflets are linear or oblong and up to 7 by 4 cm (2.8 by 1.6 in), with stalked and wedge-shaped bases and rounded apexes. The inflorescence is a dense hairy spike up to 10 cm (4 in) long at the tip of the twig or in a leaf axil. The white flowers are bisexual and have parts in fives. They are followed by reddish-brown, flattened pods up to 30 by 3 cm (12 by 1 in). The seeds are flat and oblong, with a papery wing.

== Distribution and habitat ==
Newtonia paucijuga is native to East Africa, where its range extends from southeastern Kenya to southern Tanzania. It is found in forests at elevations of up to 500 m (1,640 ft); this can be moist evergreen forest or drier evergreen forest, as well as riverine forest and secondary forest. These types of habitat are under threat from human development.

== Status ==
This tree is fairly common in suitable habitat in East Africa, for example in the Shimba Hills in Kenya, but it has a limited range, being only found in fragments of coastal and gallery forest, and the International Union for Conservation of Nature has assessed its conservation status as "vulnerable".
