= Cola boxiana =

Conservation status
- Endangered (IUCN 2.3)

Scientific classification
- Kingdom: Plantae
- Clade: Tracheophytes
- Clade: Angiosperms
- Clade: Eudicots
- Clade: Rosids
- Order: Malvales
- Family: Malvaceae
- Genus: Cola
- Species: C. boxiana

Binomial name
- Cola boxiana Brenan & Keay

Species of tree

Cola boxiana is a species of medium tree in the Family Malvaceae. It is endemic to the lowland Eastern Guinean forests, or tropical rainforests, of Ghana. As with many tree species growing in these coastal rainforests, it is threatened by habitat loss.
