= Cola glabra =

Conservation status
- Vulnerable (IUCN 2.3)

Scientific classification
- Kingdom: Plantae
- Clade: Tracheophytes
- Clade: Angiosperms
- Clade: Eudicots
- Clade: Rosids
- Order: Malvales
- Family: Malvaceae
- Genus: Cola
- Species: C. glabra

Binomial name
- Cola glabra Brenan & Keay

Species of flowering plant

Cola glabra is a species of flowering plant in the family Malvaceae. It is found only in Nigeria. It is threatened by habitat loss.
