= Cola lukei =

Conservation status
- Critically Endangered (IUCN 3.1)

Scientific classification
- Kingdom: Plantae
- Clade: Embryophytes
- Clade: Tracheophytes
- Clade: Spermatophytes
- Clade: Angiosperms
- Clade: Eudicots
- Clade: Rosids
- Order: Malvales
- Family: Malvaceae
- Genus: Cola
- Species: C. lukei

Binomial name
- Cola lukei Cheek

Species of flowering plant

Cola lukei is a species of flowering plant in the family Malvaceae. It is found only in Tanzania. Its natural habitat is subtropical or tropical moist lowland forests. It is threatened by habitat loss.

This particular species was discovered by graduate students Catharine Muir and Iddi Rajabu in 1999 and subsequently named after botanist Quentin Luke.
