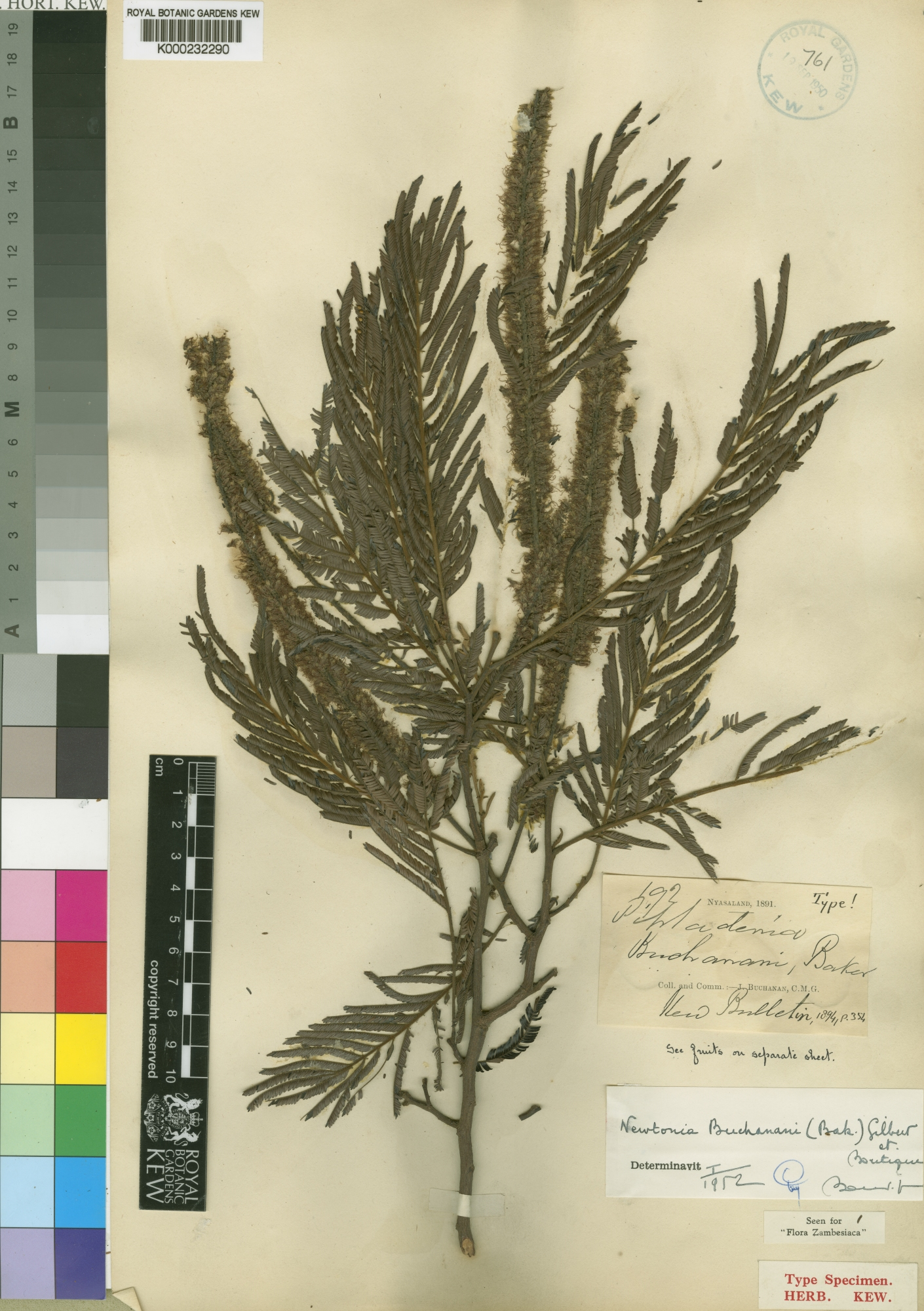

Scientific classification
- Kingdom: Plantae
- Clade: Tracheophytes
- Clade: Angiosperms
- Clade: Eudicots
- Clade: Rosids
- Order: Fabales
- Family: Fabaceae
- Subfamily: Caesalpinioideae
- Clade: Mimosoid clade
- Genus: Newtonia
- Species: N. buchananii

Binomial name
- Newtonia buchananii (Baker) G.C.C.Gilbert & Boutique

= Newtonia buchananii =

Species of legume

Newtonia buchananii is a species of plant in the family Fabaceae.

== Description ==
Newtonia buchananii is a tree from 10–40 meter high, forming a loose canopy with a flattish top. It has smooth bark, and the trunk has small buttresses at the base. The leaves are bipinnate, with numerous leaflets (38-67 pairs), linear or falcate 2–9 mm long, tiny and light green when young. It may be deciduous. The flowers cream-colored, fading to brown, in spikes 3.5 to 19 cm long.

== Distribution and habitat ==
It is found in humid highland forests in tropical Africa at elevations from 600 to 2200 meters, with a mean annual rainfall of 1100 – 3000 mm, and a mean annual temperature of 17 - 27 °C.

In Nigeria and Cameroon, it lives in highland forests at elevations of 1100 to 1800 meters.

In eastern and southern Africa, it is found in evergreen rainforest, often close to streams and lakes, at elevations from 600 to 2200 meters. Its range includes eastern Democratic Republic of the Congo, Uganda, Rwanda, Kenya, Tanzania, Angola, Zambia, Malawi, Mozambique, and Zimbabwe.

== Uses ==
The trees are harvested in the wild for their timber. It is grown in coffee, tea and cocoa plantations to provide light shade for crops.
