= Cola scheffleri =

Conservation status
- Vulnerable (IUCN 3.1)

Scientific classification
- Kingdom: Plantae
- Clade: Tracheophytes
- Clade: Angiosperms
- Clade: Eudicots
- Clade: Rosids
- Order: Malvales
- Family: Malvaceae
- Genus: Cola
- Species: C. scheffleri

Binomial name
- Cola scheffleri K.Schum.

Species of flowering plant

Cola scheffleri is a species of flowering plant in the family Malvaceae. It is found only in Tanzania.
