= Cola lizae =

Conservation status
- Near Threatened (IUCN 2.3)

Scientific classification
- Kingdom: Plantae
- Clade: Tracheophytes
- Clade: Angiosperms
- Clade: Eudicots
- Clade: Rosids
- Order: Malvales
- Family: Malvaceae
- Genus: Cola
- Species: C. lizae

Binomial name
- Cola lizae N.Hallé

Species of flowering plant

Cola lizae is a species of flowering plant in the family Malvaceae. It is found only in Gabon. It is threatened by habitat loss.

This species was first described in 1987 and named after Liz Williamson, a researcher at Lopé.
