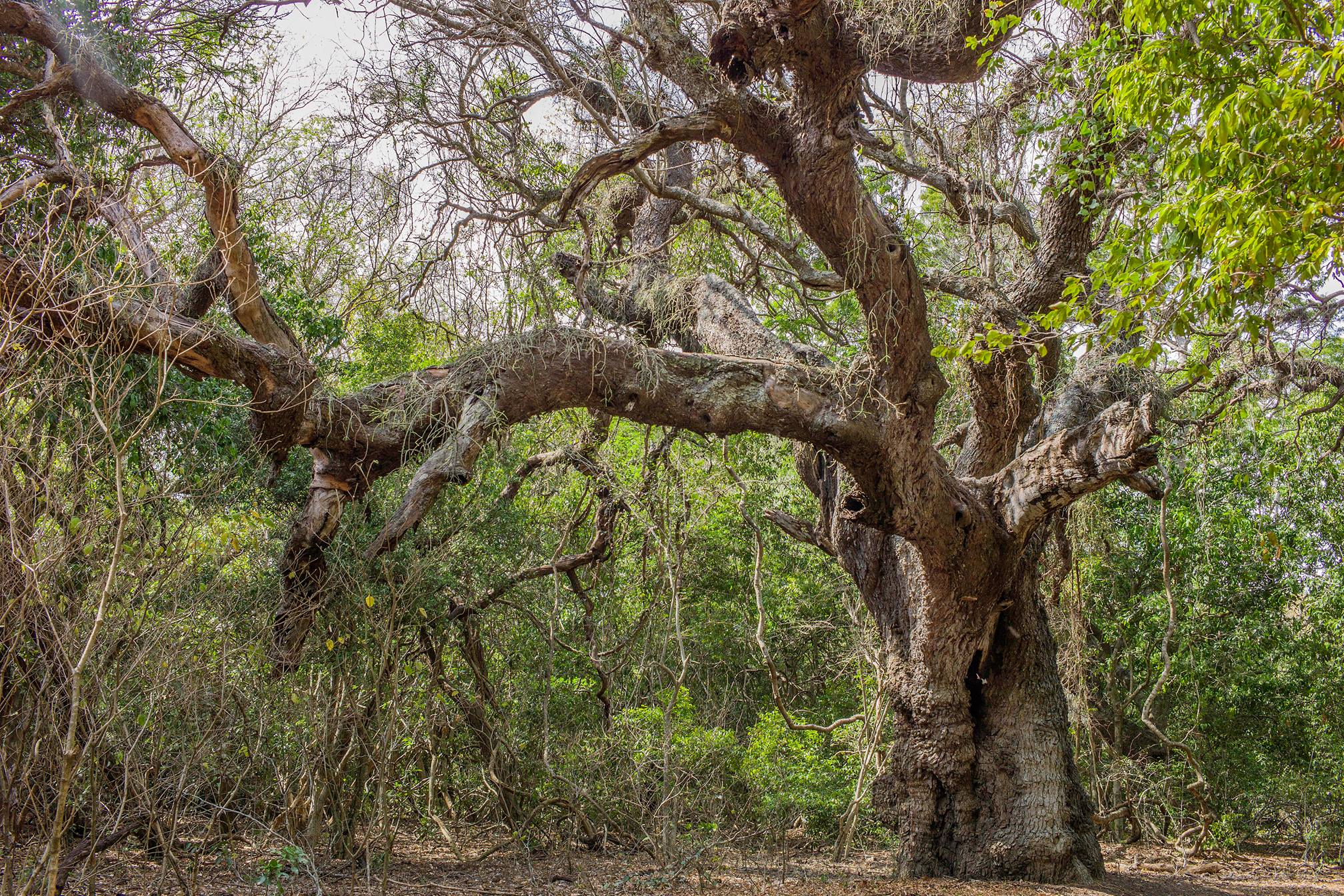
- Newtonia hildebrandtii

Scientific classification
- Kingdom: Plantae
- Clade: Tracheophytes
- Clade: Angiosperms
- Clade: Eudicots
- Clade: Rosids
- Order: Fabales
- Family: Fabaceae
- Subfamily: Caesalpinioideae
- Clade: Mimosoid clade
- Genus: Newtonia; Baill.

Species
- 16; see text

= Newtonia (plant) =

Genus of legumes

Newtonia is a genus of flowering plants in the legume family, Fabaceae. It includes 16 species of trees native to sub-Saharan Africa. It belongs to subfamily Caesalpinioideae and the Mimosoid clade or tribe. The genus is known from the early Miocene (21.73 Ma) of Ethiopia based on compressions of its diagnostic, winged seeds.

16 extant species are accepted.

- Newtonia aubrevillei (Pellegr.) Keay
- Newtonia buchananii (Baker) G.C.C.Gilbert & Boutique
- Newtonia camerunensis Villiers
- Newtonia devredii G.C.C.Gilbert & Boutique
- Newtonia duncanthomasii Mackinder & Cheek
- Newtonia duparquetiana (Baill.) Keay
- Newtonia elliotii (Harms) Keay
- Newtonia erlangeri (Harms) Brenan
- Newtonia glandulifera (Pellegr.) G.C.C.Gilbert & Boutique
- Newtonia grandifolia Villiers
- Newtonia griffoniana (Baill.) Baker f.
- Newtonia hildebrandtii (Vatke) Torre
- Newtonia leucocarpa (Harms) G.C.C.Gilbert & Boutique
- †Newtonia mushensis Pan, Currano, Jacobs, Feseha, Tabor et Herendeen, 2012 - extinct
- Newtonia paucijuga (Harms) Brenan
- Newtonia scandens Villiers
- Newtonia zenkeri Harms
