= Cola duparquetiana =

Conservation status
- Vulnerable (IUCN 2.3)

Scientific classification
- Kingdom: Plantae
- Clade: Tracheophytes
- Clade: Angiosperms
- Clade: Eudicots
- Clade: Rosids
- Order: Malvales
- Family: Malvaceae
- Genus: Cola
- Species: C. duparquetiana

Binomial name
- Cola duparquetiana Baill.

Species of flowering plant

Cola duparquetiana is a species of flowering plant in the family Malvaceae. It is found only in Gabon.
