= Cola reticulata =

Conservation status
- Vulnerable (IUCN 2.3)

Scientific classification
- Kingdom: Plantae
- Clade: Tracheophytes
- Clade: Angiosperms
- Clade: Eudicots
- Clade: Rosids
- Order: Malvales
- Family: Malvaceae
- Genus: Cola
- Species: C. reticulata

Binomial name
- Cola reticulata A.Chev.

Synonyms
- Sterculia reticulata (A.Chev.) Roberty; Cola johnsonii Stapf ex A.Chev.

Species of flowering plant

Cola reticulata is a species of flowering plant in the family Malvaceae. It is found in Ivory Coast, Ghana, and Guinea. It is threatened by habitat loss.
