= Cola lorougnonis =

Conservation status
- Critically Endangered (IUCN 3.1)

Scientific classification
- Kingdom: Plantae
- Clade: Embryophytes
- Clade: Tracheophytes
- Clade: Spermatophytes
- Clade: Angiosperms
- Clade: Eudicots
- Clade: Rosids
- Order: Malvales
- Family: Malvaceae
- Genus: Cola
- Species: C. lorougnonis

Binomial name
- Cola lorougnonis Aké Assi

Species of tropical rainforest tree

Cola lorougnonis is a species of tropical rainforest tree in the family Malvaceae. It is native to Cameroon, Guinea, Ivory Coast, and Liberia.
