= Cola gigas =

Conservation status
- Vulnerable (IUCN 2.3)

Scientific classification
- Kingdom: Plantae
- Clade: Tracheophytes
- Clade: Angiosperms
- Clade: Eudicots
- Clade: Rosids
- Order: Malvales
- Family: Malvaceae
- Genus: Cola
- Species: C. gigas

Binomial name
- Cola gigas Baker f.

Species of flowering plant

Cola gigas is a species of flowering plant in the family Malvaceae. It is found only in Nigeria and is threatened by habitat loss.
