= Cola hypochrysea =

Conservation status
- Endangered (IUCN 3.1)

Scientific classification
- Kingdom: Plantae
- Clade: Tracheophytes
- Clade: Angiosperms
- Clade: Eudicots
- Clade: Rosids
- Order: Malvales
- Family: Malvaceae
- Genus: Cola
- Species: C. hypochrysea

Binomial name
- Cola hypochrysea K.Schum.

Species of flowering plant

Cola hypochrysea is a species of flowering plant in the family Malvaceae. It is found in Cameroon and Nigeria. It is threatened by habitat loss.
