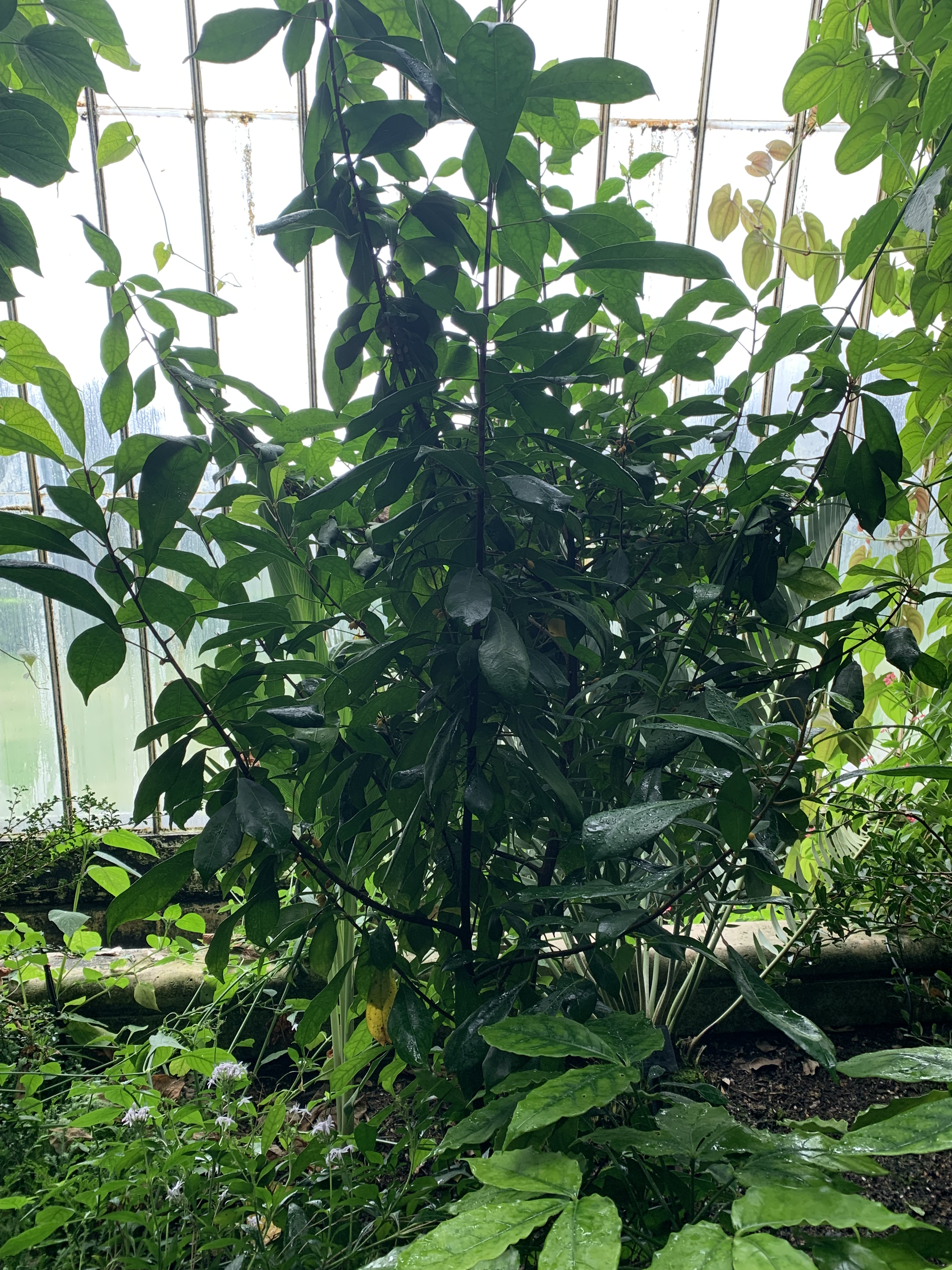
- Growing ex situ at Kew Gardens

Conservation status
- Vulnerable (IUCN 3.1)

Scientific classification
- Kingdom: Plantae
- Clade: Tracheophytes
- Clade: Angiosperms
- Clade: Eudicots
- Clade: Rosids
- Order: Malvales
- Family: Malvaceae
- Genus: Cola
- Species: C. cabindensis

Binomial name
- Cola cabindensis Exell

= Cola cabindensis =

Species of flowering plant

Cola cabindensis is a species of flowering plant in the family Malvaceae. It is found only in Cabinda, Republic of the Congo, and Democratic Republic of the Congo. According to IUCN this species is found at only seven different locations, with a total area of occupancy estimated at just 44 km^{2}.
