= Kola nut =

Fruit of the kola tree

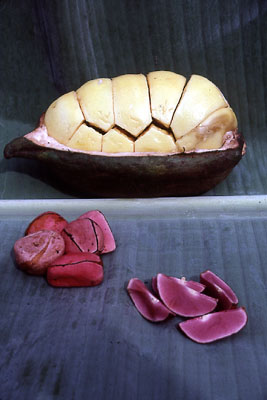
Kola nut – pod with half shell removed to reveal prismatic seeds inside their white testa, and fresh seeds (whole without testa on the left and, on the right, split into cotyledons)

The kola nut is the seed of certain species of plant of the genus Cola, placed formerly in the cocoa family Sterculiaceae, and now usually subsumed in the mallow family Malvaceae (as subfamily Sterculioideae). These species are trees native to the tropical rainforests of Africa. Their caffeine-containing seeds are used as flavoring ingredients in various carbonated soft drinks; the name "cola" for a variety of soft drink is derived from this use.

== Description ==
About 5 centimetres (2 in) across, the kola nut is a nut of evergreen trees of the genus Cola, primarily of the species Cola acuminata and Cola nitida. Cola acuminata, an evergreen tree about 20 meters in height, has long, ovoid leaves pointed at both the ends with a leathery texture. The trees have cream-white flowers with purplish-brown striations, and star-shaped fruit consisting of usually five follicles. Inside each follicle, about a dozen prismatic seeds develop in a white seed-shell. The nut has a reddish or white color flesh on the inside, and has a sweet and rose-like aroma.

Kola nuts contain about 2–4% caffeine and theobromine, as well as tannins, alkaloids, saponins, and flavonoids.

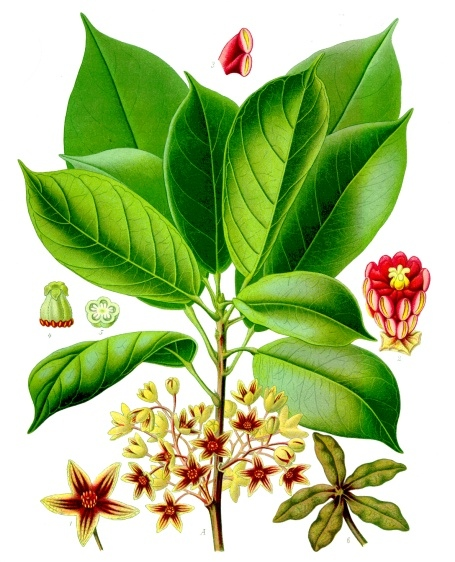
Cola acuminata in flower: colored plate from Köhler's Medizinal-Pflanzen

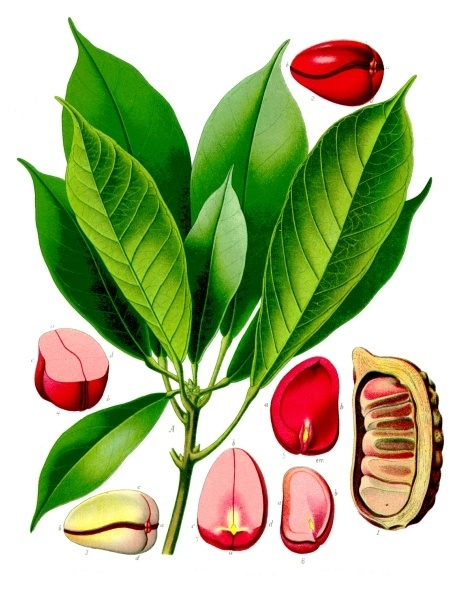
Cola acuminata in fruit, also from Köhler's Medizinal-Pflanzen

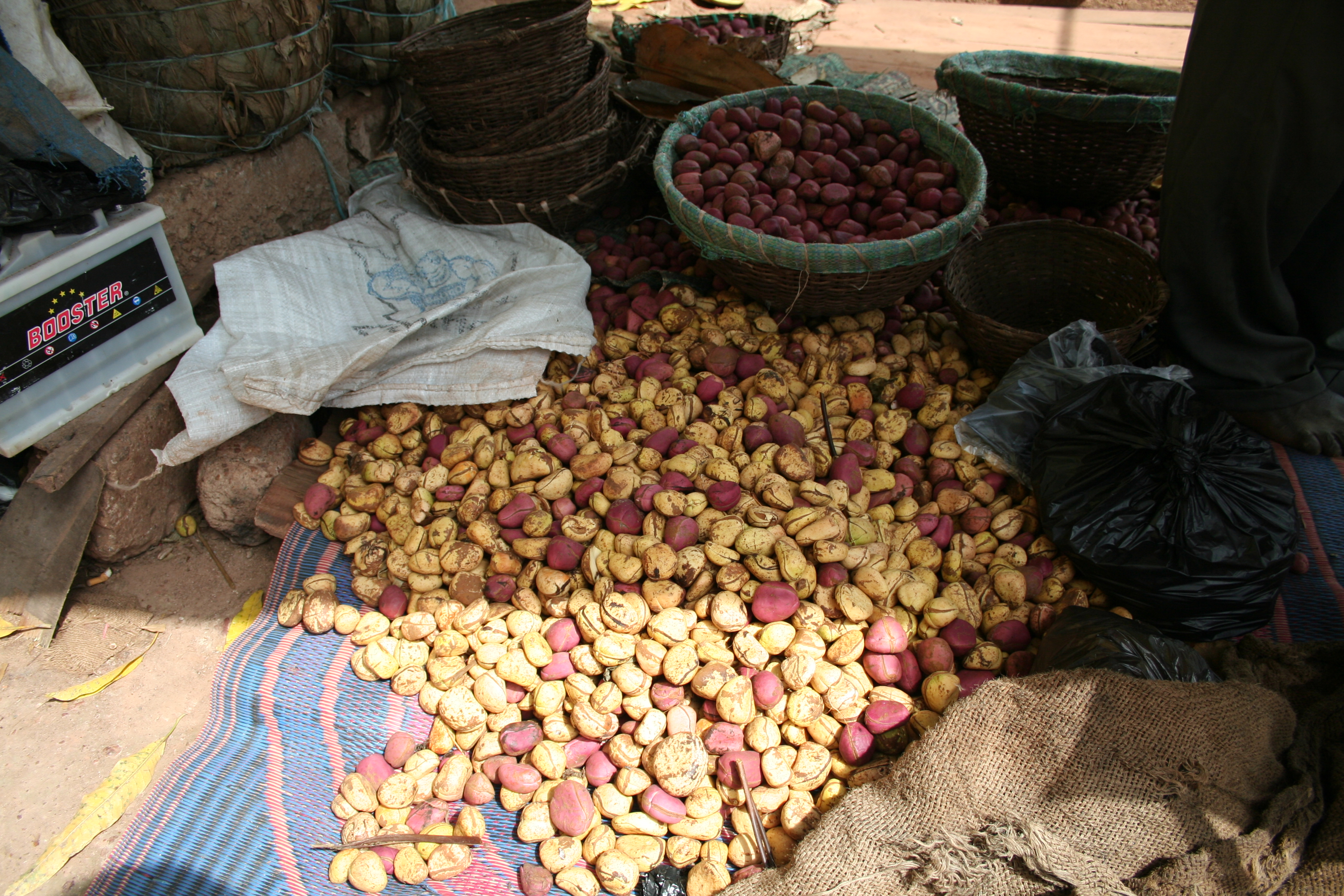
Kola nuts spread out for sale in the central market in Ouagadougou, Burkina Faso

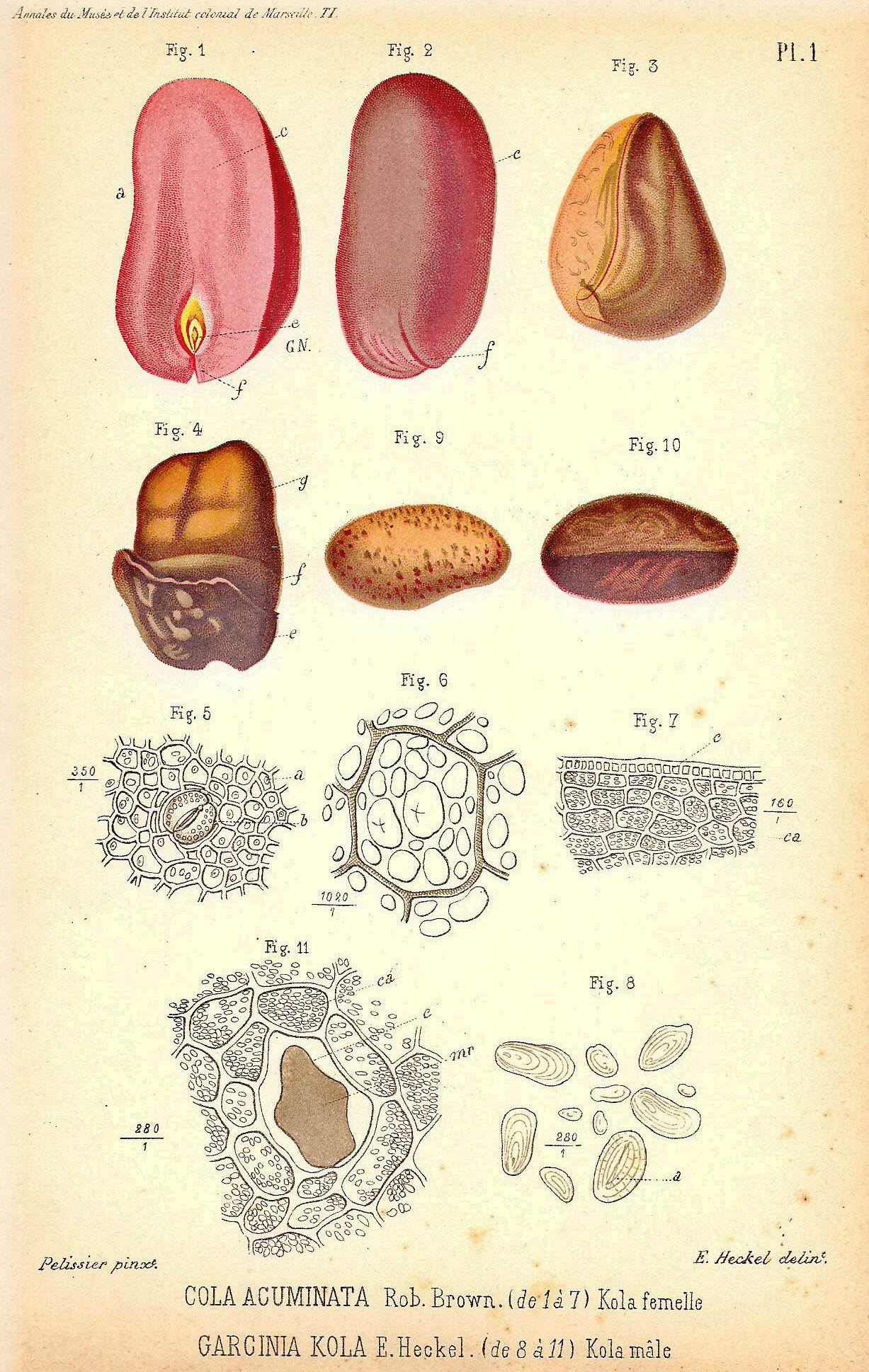
Seeds of true / "female" kola (= Cola acuminata) compared and contrasted with those of bitter / "male" kola (= Garcinia kola)

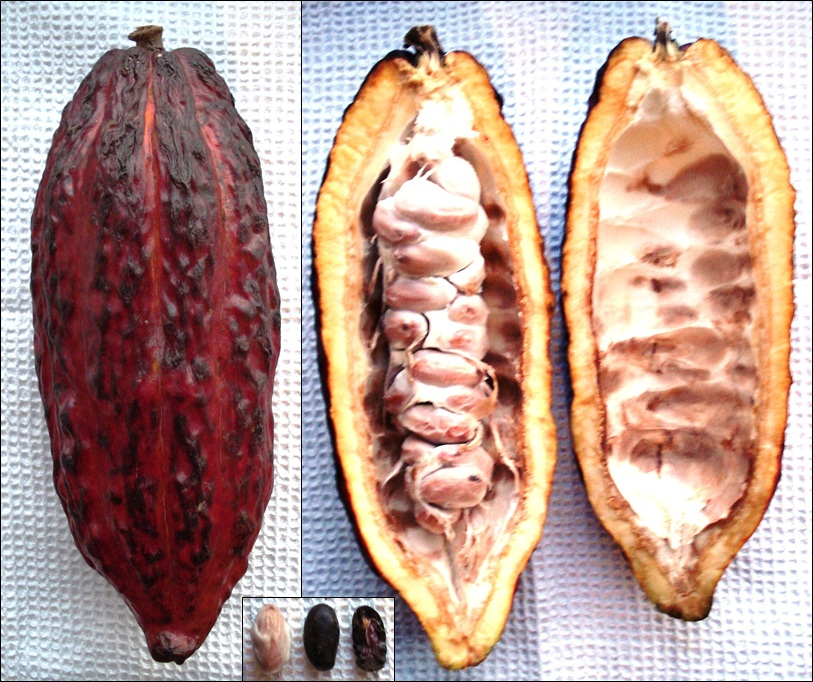
Cocoa pod: fruit of (true) kola relative Theobroma cacao bisected to show similarity of structure to that of fruit of Cola acuminata

=== Chemistry ===
Preliminary studies of phytochemicals in kola nut indicate the presence of various constituents: caffeine (2–3.5%), theobromine (1.0–2.5%), theophylline, methylliberine, polyphenols, catechins, and phlobaphens (kola red), among others.

== Cultivation ==
Originally a tree of the tropical rainforest, it needs a hot humid climate, but can withstand a dry season on sites with a high ground water level. It may be cultivated in drier areas where groundwater is available. C. nitida is a shade bearer, but develops a better spreading crown which yields more fruits in open places. Though it is a lowland forest tree, it has been found at altitudes over 300 m on deep, rich soils under heavy and evenly distributed rainfall.

Regular weeding is necessary, which can be performed manually or through the use of herbicides. Some irrigation can be provided to the plants, but it is important to remove the water through an effective drainage system, as excess water may prove to be detrimental for the growth of the plant. When not grown in adequate shade, the kola nut plant responds well to fertilizers. Usually, the plants need to be provided with windbreaks to protect them from strong gales.

Kola nuts can be harvested mechanically or by hand, by plucking them at the tree branch. A single tree produces hundreds of pods. Nigeria produces 52.4% of worldwide production followed by the Ivory Coast and Cameroon. When kept in a cool, dry place, kola nuts can be stored for a long time.

The crop's value makes it one of the most important indigenous cash crops in West Africa and is used as a means of social mobility.

=== Pests and diseases ===
The nuts are subject to attack by the kola weevil Balanogastris kolae. The larvae of the moth Characoma strictigrapta that also attacks cacao, will bore into the nuts as well. Traders sometimes apply an extract of the bark of Rauvolfia vomitoria or the pulverised fruits of Xylopia and Capsicum to counteract the attack on nursery plants. The cacao pests Sahlbergella spp. have been found also on C. nitida as an alternative host plant. While seeds are liable to worm attack, the wood is subject to borer attack.

=== Production ===
Top 5 countries for kola nut production, 2024
Country	tonnes
Nigeria	179,000
Ivory Coast	59,100
Cameroon	48,500
Ghana	25,000
Sierra Leone	4,800
World	316,000

In 2024, world production of kola nuts was approximately 316,000 tonnes (697,000,000 lb), led by Nigeria with 55% of the total global production (see table).

Kola nut yield

Production of kola nuts

== Uses ==
The kola nut has a bitter flavor and contains caffeine. The nut is a nervous system stimulant and is chewed in many West African countries, in both private and social settings. It is often used ceremonially, presented to chiefs or guests. Throughout history, kola nuts have been planted on graves as part of various rituals. Laborers in many countries also grow kola nuts in efforts to fight fatigue and hunger, while Brazilians and people of the West Indies use the nut as a remedy for hangovers, intoxication, and diarrhea.

In folk medicine, kola nuts are considered useful for aiding digestion when ground and mixed with honey, and are used as a remedy for coughs. Kola nuts are an important part of the traditional spiritual practice, culture, and religion in West Africa, particularly Ghana, Niger, Nigeria, Sierra Leone, Democratic Republic of Congo and Liberia.

Kola nuts have been used medicinally in West Africa for many purposes, ranging from a diuretic or laxative, to a hunger suppressant, to a treatment for motion sickness and migraines. After knowledge of the nut reached the United States in the nineteenth century, it was falsely advertised as a cure for asthma by the Kola Importing Company.

Kola nuts are perhaps best known to Western culture as a flavoring ingredient and one of the sources of caffeine in cola and other similarly flavored beverages, although kola nut extract is no longer claimed on the labels of major commercial cola drinks such as Coca-Cola.

== History ==
Human use of the kola nut, like the coffee berry and tea leaf, appears to have ancient origins. Kola nuts were part of the West African trade from at least the 11th century. They were grown and preserved in the coastal forests from Guinea to Nigeria, and sent off to the southern Sahara and Sudan. By the 13th century, kola nut exports reached the Mediterranean coast of North Africa. The spread of the kola nut across North Africa seems to be connected to the spread of Islam across West Africa during the 17th century, as trading across the Mediterranean became established.

A French voyager named Chevalier Des Marchais, who traveled to West Africa in the late 1720s, noted that the nut made the, "bitterest, our sourest Things taste Sweet after it." These sweet alterations are attributed to the chemical substances that the nut adds to one's palate or the sheer amount of caffeine.

The nut was a major commodity in 19th century intra-African trade, being imported from the Asante Empire by large caravans heading to further inland markets such as Kano of the Sokoto Caliphate where their primary consumers were aristocrats and scholars. This Kola trade also extended to Bornu markets. Kola nuts experienced a burst of interest in Western markets in the 19th century, and were first used as an ingredient within Coca-Cola and Pepsi-Cola in 1886 and 1893 respectively.

=== Cola recipe ===
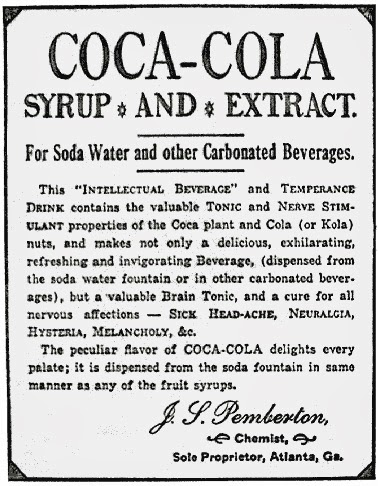
Coca-Cola advertisement, 1886

In the 1880s, a pharmacist in Georgia, John Pemberton, took caffeine extracted from kola nuts and cocaine-containing extracts from coca leaves and mixed them with sugar, other flavorings, and carbonated water to invent Coca-Cola, the first widely popular cola soft drink. Although the exact details of its cola recipe remain confidential, as of 2016, the Coca-Cola formula no longer contained actual kola nut extract, and an independent test conducted to identify it failed to detect its signature proteins.

== In culture ==
=== Traditional uses ===
Used in cultural traditions of the Igbo people, the presentation of kola nuts to guests or in a traditional gathering shows good will. It is regarded as a food of the gods, being placed on earth to allow humans to communicate with them.

It is used in Yoruba religion both as an offering to orishas and as an instrument of divination.

=== Modern references ===
A kola nut ceremony is briefly described in Chinua Achebe's 1958 novel Things Fall Apart. The eating of kola nuts is referred to at least ten times in the novel, showing the kola nut's significance in pre-colonial 1890s Igbo culture in Nigeria. One of these sayings on kola nut in Things Fall Apart is "He who brings kola brings life." It is also featured prominently in Chris Abani's 2004 novel GraceLand. The kola nut is also mentioned in The Color Purple by Alice Walker, although it is spelled "cola".

The kola nut is mentioned in Bloc Party's song "Where is Home?" on the album A Weekend in the City. The lyric, setting a post-funeral scene for the murder of a black boy in London, reads, "After the funeral, breaking kola nuts, we sit and reminisce about the past." The kola nut is mentioned in the At the Drive-In song "Enfilade" on the album Relationship of Command. The kola nut is repeatedly mentioned in Chimamanda Ngozi Adichie's novel Half of a Yellow Sun, which also features the phrase: "He who brings the Kola nut brings life."

== See also ==
- Coca Cola
- Things Fall Apart
