= Cola cecidiifolia =

Conservation status
- Endangered (IUCN 3.1)

Scientific classification
- Kingdom: Plantae
- Clade: Tracheophytes
- Clade: Angiosperms
- Clade: Eudicots
- Clade: Rosids
- Order: Malvales
- Family: Malvaceae
- Genus: Cola
- Species: C. cecidiifolia

Binomial name
- Cola cecidiifolia Cheek

Species of flowering plant

Cola cecidiifolia is a species of flowering plant in the Family Malvaceae. It is found only in Cameroon. Its natural habitat is subtropical or tropical moist lowland forests. It is threatened by habitat loss.
