= Cola anomala =

Scientific classification
- Kingdom: Plantae
- Clade: Tracheophytes
- Clade: Angiosperms
- Clade: Eudicots
- Clade: Rosids
- Order: Malvales
- Family: Malvaceae
- Genus: Cola
- Species: C. anomala

Binomial name
- Cola anomala K.Schum.

Species of plant

Cola anomala is a tree native to land within the borders of Cameroon that primarily grows in a wet tropical biome.
