= Cola elegans =

Scientific classification
- Kingdom: Plantae
- Clade: Tracheophytes
- Clade: Angiosperms
- Clade: Eudicots
- Clade: Rosids
- Order: Malvales
- Family: Malvaceae
- Genus: Cola
- Species: C. elegans

Binomial name
- Cola elegans Pierre ex Breteler, 2014

Species of flowering plant

Cola elegans is a species of trees, classified in the family Malvaceae, subfamily Sterculioideae (or treated in the separate family Sterculiaceae). It is found in Gabon.
