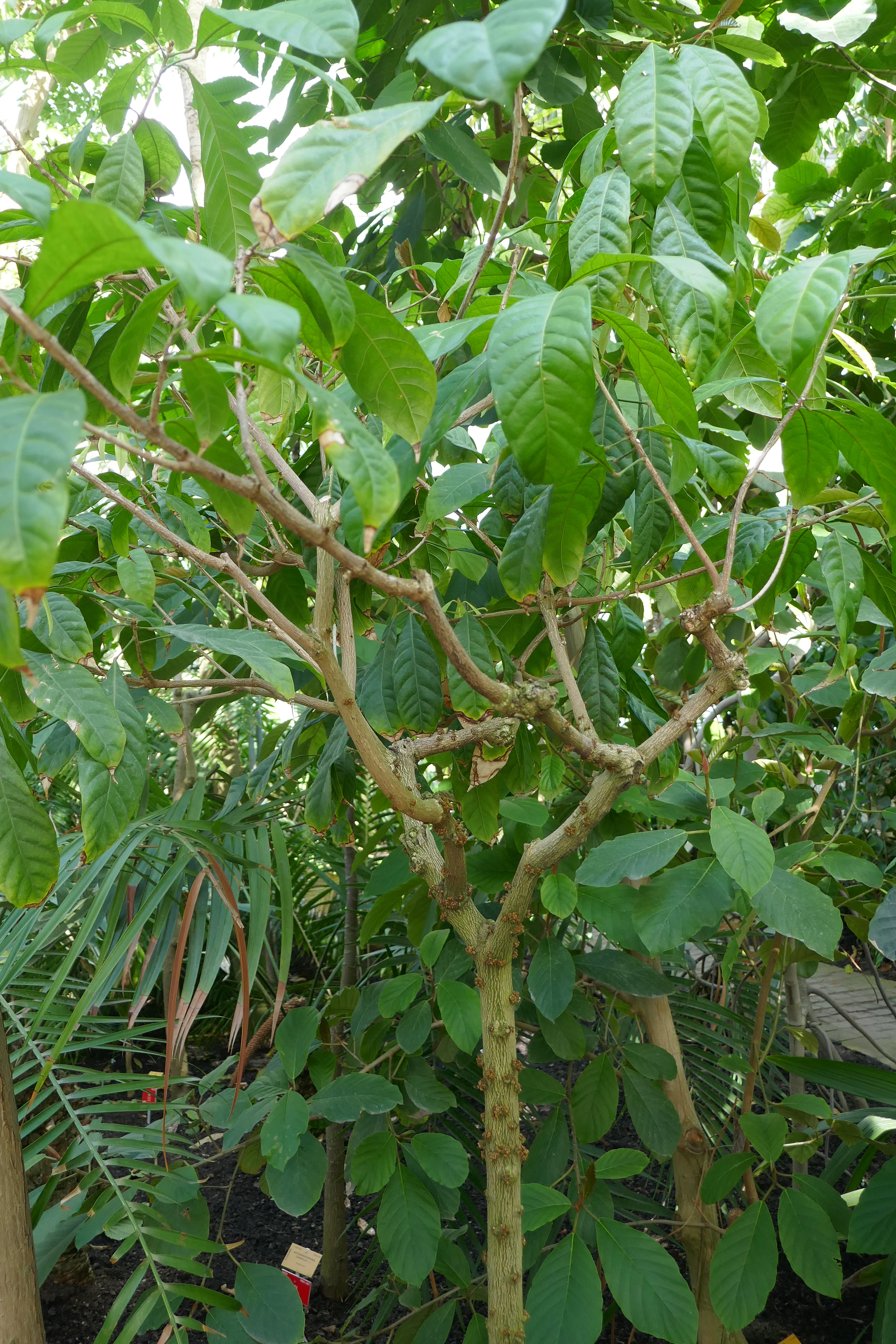

Conservation status
- Endangered (IUCN 2.3)

Scientific classification
- Kingdom: Plantae
- Clade: Tracheophytes
- Clade: Angiosperms
- Clade: Eudicots
- Clade: Rosids
- Order: Malvales
- Family: Malvaceae
- Genus: Cola
- Species: C. attiensis

Binomial name
- Cola attiensis Aubrev. & Pellegrin

= Cola attiensis =

Species of flowering plant

Cola attiensis is a species of flowering plant in the Family Malvaceae. It is endemic to Côte d'Ivoire. An extract from the plant exhibits visceral antileishmanial properties.
