= Newtonia camerunensis =

Conservation status
- Critically Endangered (IUCN 2.3)

Scientific classification
- Kingdom: Plantae
- Clade: Tracheophytes
- Clade: Angiosperms
- Clade: Eudicots
- Clade: Rosids
- Order: Fabales
- Family: Fabaceae
- Subfamily: Caesalpinioideae
- Clade: Mimosoid clade
- Genus: Newtonia
- Species: N. camerunensis

Binomial name
- Newtonia camerunensis J.F.Villiers

Species of legume

Newtonia camerunensis is a species of plant in the family Fabaceae. It is found only in Cameroon. Its natural habitat is subtropical or tropical dry forests.
