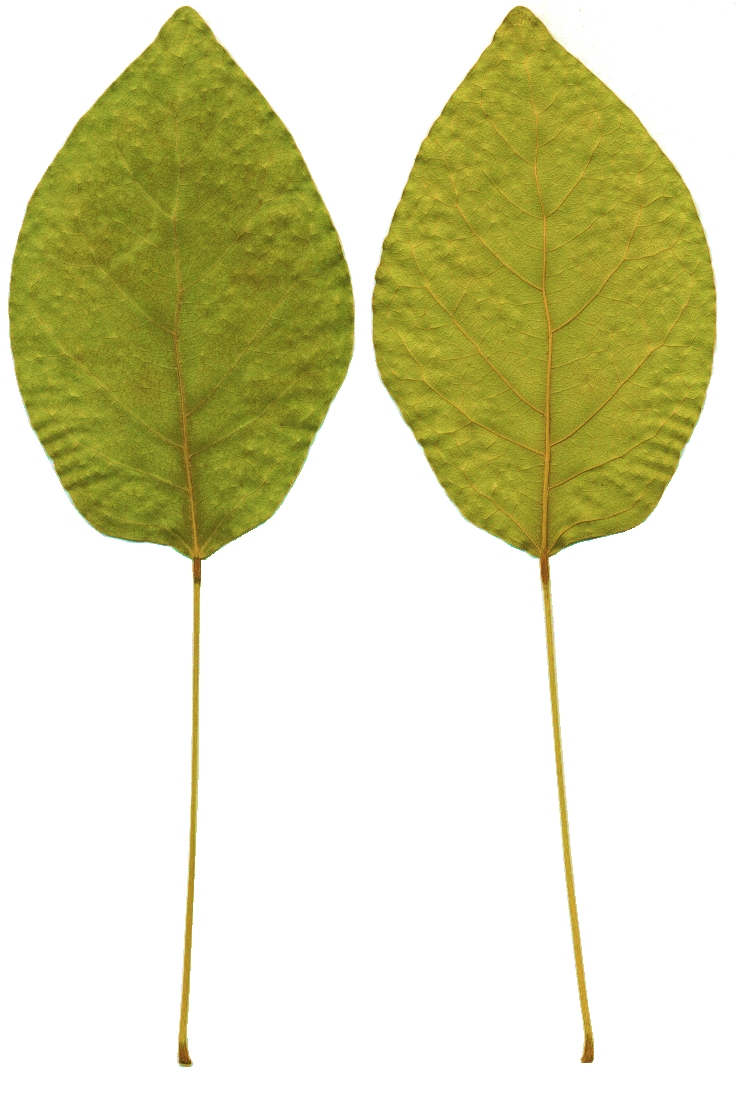
- Leaf on long petiole with pulvinus

Conservation status
- Vulnerable (IUCN 2.3)

Scientific classification
- Kingdom: Plantae
- Clade: Tracheophytes
- Clade: Angiosperms
- Clade: Eudicots
- Clade: Rosids
- Order: Malvales
- Family: Malvaceae
- Genus: Cola
- Species: C. mossambicensis

Binomial name
- Cola mossambicensis Wild

= Cola mossambicensis =

Species of flowering plant

Cola mossambicensis, the Mozambique cola, is a large evergreen forest tree of the family Malvaceae endemic to central Moçambique and Malawi. As with other Cola species the flowers are carried in clusters on old wood and the seed is released when the mature fruits split longitudinally.
