= Cola usambarensis =

Conservation status
- Critically Endangered (IUCN 3.1)

Scientific classification
- Kingdom: Plantae
- Clade: Tracheophytes
- Clade: Angiosperms
- Clade: Eudicots
- Clade: Rosids
- Order: Malvales
- Family: Malvaceae
- Genus: Cola
- Species: C. usambarensis

Binomial name
- Cola usambarensis Engl.

Species of flowering plant

Cola usambarensis is a species of flowering plant in the family Malvaceae. It is found only in Tanzania.
