= Cola urceolata =

Scientific classification
- Kingdom: Plantae
- Clade: Tracheophytes
- Clade: Angiosperms
- Clade: Eudicots
- Clade: Rosids
- Order: Malvales
- Family: Malvaceae
- Genus: Cola
- Species: C. urceolata

Binomial name
- Cola urceolata K.Schum. (1900)

Synonyms
- Cola longifolia De Wild.; Cola nalaensis De Wild.; Cola nalaensis subsp. variifolia De Wild.; Cola yambuyaensis De Wild.

Species of plant

Cola urceolata, also known as bemange, bokosa, eboli, egwasa, ikaie, lekukumu, lungandu, lusakani, matadohohu, nesunguna, ngbilimo, ngono, and zimonziele, is a flowering shrub in the family Malvaceae. The specific epithet (urceolata) comes from Latin urceus (= pitcher, jug) and means "urn-shaped".

== Distribution ==
Cola urceolata is native to Central Africa, from southeastern Nigeria south to Kongo Central province of the Democratic Republic of the Congo and northeast to southeastern Central African Republic.

== Description ==
Cola urceolata is an evergreen shrub that grows to 3 meters (9.8 feet) in height. The dark green leaves are elliptical in shape and the flowers are yellow to white and three-petaled. The fruit somewhat resembles a pepper in shape, and is red when ripe and green when unripe. It is curved and tapers to a point towards its non-stem end. They grow in clusters, normally of three. The fruit, seeds, flowers, and leaves are edible.

== Uses ==
The fruit and other edible parts of the plant are eaten raw or cooked in its native range.

== See also ==
- List of culinary fruits
