= Balanogastris kolae =

Scientific classification
- Kingdom: Animalia
- Phylum: Arthropoda
- Class: Insecta
- Order: Coleoptera
- Suborder: Polyphaga
- Infraorder: Cucujiformia
- Family: Curculionidae
- Genus: Balanogastris
- Species: B. kolae

Binomial name
- Balanogastris kolae (Desbrochers, 1895)

Species of beetles

Balanogastris kolae, the kola weevil, is a species of insect that feeds on kola nuts.
