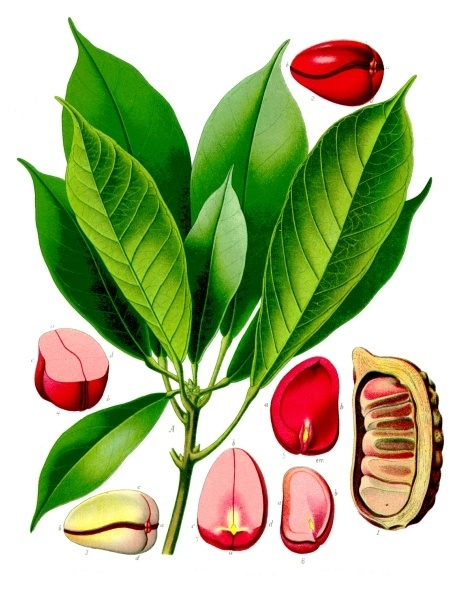
- Cola acuminata

Scientific classification
- Kingdom: Plantae
- Clade: Tracheophytes
- Clade: Angiosperms
- Clade: Eudicots
- Clade: Rosids
- Order: Malvales
- Family: Malvaceae
- Subfamily: Sterculioideae
- Genus: Cola; Schott & Endl.

Species
- See text

Synonyms
- Bichea Stokes; Braxipis Raf.; Chlamydocola (K.Schum.) M.Bodard; Colaria Raf.; Courtenia R.Br.; Edwardia Raf.; Icosinia Raf.; Ingonia Pierre ex M.Bodard; Lunanea DC.; Siphoniopsis H.Karst.

= Cola (plant) =

Genus of plants

Cola is a genus of trees native to the tropical forests of Africa, classified in the family Malvaceae, subfamily Sterculioideae (previously in the separate family Sterculiaceae). Species in this genus are sometimes referred to as kola tree or kola nut for the caffeine-containing fruit produced by the trees that is often used as a flavoring ingredient in beverages. The genus was thought to be closely related to the South American genus Theobroma, or cocoa, but the latter is now placed in a different subfamily. They are evergreen trees, growing up to 20 m tall (about 65 feet), with glossy ovoid leaves up to 30 cm (1 foot) long and star-shaped fruit.

== Origin and distribution ==
Cola is a genus of the family Malvaceae with approximately 140 species occurring in the evergreen lowland and montane forest of continental (primarily tropical) Africa. The earliest known evidence of Cola is Cola amharaensis, a well-preserved fossil leaf compression from the late Oligocene Guang River flora of Ethiopia and dated to 27.23 ± 0.1 Ma. Kola nuts are seeds harvested from pods, primarily from the species Cola nitida and Cola acuminata. Outside mainland Africa, some species are cultivated for their nuts in Brazil, Jamaica and elsewhere in the humid tropics.

== Species ==
139 species are accepted.

- Cola acuminata (P.Beauv.) Schott & Endl.
- Cola altissima Engl.
- Cola angustifolia K.Schum.
- Cola anomala K.Schum.
- Cola argentea Mast.
- Cola asymmetrica Cheek
- Cola attiensis Aubrév. & Pellegr.
- Cola baldwinii Jongkind
- Cola ballayi Cornu ex Heckel
- Cola bilenguensis Pellegr.
- Cola bipindensis Engl.
- Cola bodardii Pellegr.
- Cola boxiana Brenan & Keay
- Cola brevipes K.Schum.
- Cola bruneelii De Wild.
- Cola buesgenii Engl.
- Cola buntingii Baker f.
- Cola cabindensis Exell
- Cola caricifolia (G.Don) K.Schum.
- Cola cauliflora Mast.
- Cola cecidiifolia Cheek
- Cola cheringoma Cheek
- Cola chlamydantha K.Schum.
- Cola chlorantha F.White
- Cola clavata Mast.
- Cola coccinea Engl. & K.Krause
- Cola congolana De Wild. & T.Durand
- Cola cordifolia (Cav.) R.Br.
- Cola crispiflora K.Schum.
- Cola digitata Mast.
- Cola discoglypremnophylla Brenan & A.P.D.Jones
- Cola diversifolia De Wild. & T.Durand
- Cola dorrii Cheek
- Cola duparquetiana Baill.
- Cola edeensis Engl. & K.Krause
- Cola elegans Pierre ex Breteler
- Cola etugei Cheek
- Cola fibrillosa Engl. & K.Krause
- Cola ficifolia Mast.
- Cola flaviflora Engl. & K.Krause
- Cola flavovelutina K.Schum.
- Cola gabonensis Mast.
- Cola gigantea A.Chev.
- Cola gigas Baker f.
- Cola gilgiana Engl.
- Cola gilletii De Wild.
- Cola glabra Brenan & Keay
- Cola glaucoviridis Pellegr.
- Cola greenwayi Brenan
- Cola griseiflora De Wild.
- Cola heterophylla (P.Beauv.) Schott & Endl.
- Cola hispida Brenan & Keay
- Cola hypochrysea K.Schum.
- Cola idoumensis Pellegr.
- Cola kimbozensis Cheek
- Cola kodminensis Cheek
- Cola lasiantha Engl. & K.Krause
- Cola lateritia K.Schum.
- Cola laurifolia Mast.
- Cola le-testui Pellegr.
- Cola lepidota K.Schum.
- Cola letouzeyana Nkongmeneck
- Cola liberica Jongkind
- Cola lissachensis Pellegr.
- Cola lizae N.Hallé
- Cola lomensis Engl. & K.Krause
- Cola lorougnonis Aké Assi
- Cola louisii Germ.
- Cola lukei Cheek
- Cola macrantha K.Schum.
- Cola mahoundensis Pellegr.
- Cola mamboana Kenfack & Sainge
- Cola marsupium K.Schum.
- Cola mayimbensis Pellegr.
- Cola mayumbensis Exell
- Cola megalophylla Brenan & Keay
- Cola metallica Cheek
- Cola micrantha K.Schum.
- Cola microcarpa Brenan
- Cola millenii K.Schum.
- Cola minor Brenan
- Cola mixta A.Chev.
- Cola mossambicensis Wild
- Cola mosserayana Germ.
- Cola moussavoui Breteler
- Cola nana Engl. & K.Krause
- Cola natalensis Oliv.
- Cola ndongensis Engl. & K.Krause
- Cola nigerica Brenan & Keay
- Cola nitida (Vent.) Schott & Endl.
- Cola noldeae Exell & Mendonça
- Cola obtusa Engl. & K.Krause
- Cola octoloboides Brenan
- Cola pachycarpa K.Schum.
- Cola pallida A.Chev.
- Cola philipi-jonesii Brenan & Keay
- Cola pierlotii Germ.
- Cola porphyrantha Brenan
- Cola praeacuta Brenan & Keay
- Cola pseudoclavata Cheek
- Cola pulcherrima Engl.
- Cola quentinii Cheek
- Cola quintasii Engl.
- Cola reticulata A.Chev.
- Cola rhynchophylla K.Schum.
- Cola ricinifolia Engl. & K.Krause
- Cola rondoensis Cheek
- Cola rostrata K.Schum.
- Cola roy Cheek
- Cola ruawaensis Cheek
- Cola rubra A.Chev.
- Cola scheffleri K.Schum.
- Cola sciaphila Louis ex Germ.
- Cola selengana Germ.
- Cola semecarpophylla K.Schum.
- Cola simiarum Sprague ex Brenan & Keay
- Cola sphaerocarpa A.Chev.
- Cola sphaerosperma Heckel
- Cola stelechantha Brenan
- Cola stigmatosa Breteler
- Cola subglaucescens Engl.
- Cola suboppositifolia Cheek
- Cola sulcata Engl.
- Cola supfiana Busse
- Cola takamanda Cheek
- Cola tessmannii Engl. & K.Krause
- Cola toyota Cheek
- Cola triloba (R.Br.) K.Schum.
- Cola tsandensis Pellegr.
- Cola uloloma Brenan
- Cola umbratilis Brenan & Keay
- Cola urceolata K.Schum.
- Cola usambarensis Engl.
- Cola vandersmisseniana Germ.
- Cola verticillata (Thonn.) Stapf ex A.Chev.
- Cola welwitschii Exell & Mendonça ex R.Germ.
- Cola winkleri Engl.
- Cola zanaga Cheek
- Cola zemagoana Kenfack & D.W.Thomas

== Gallery ==
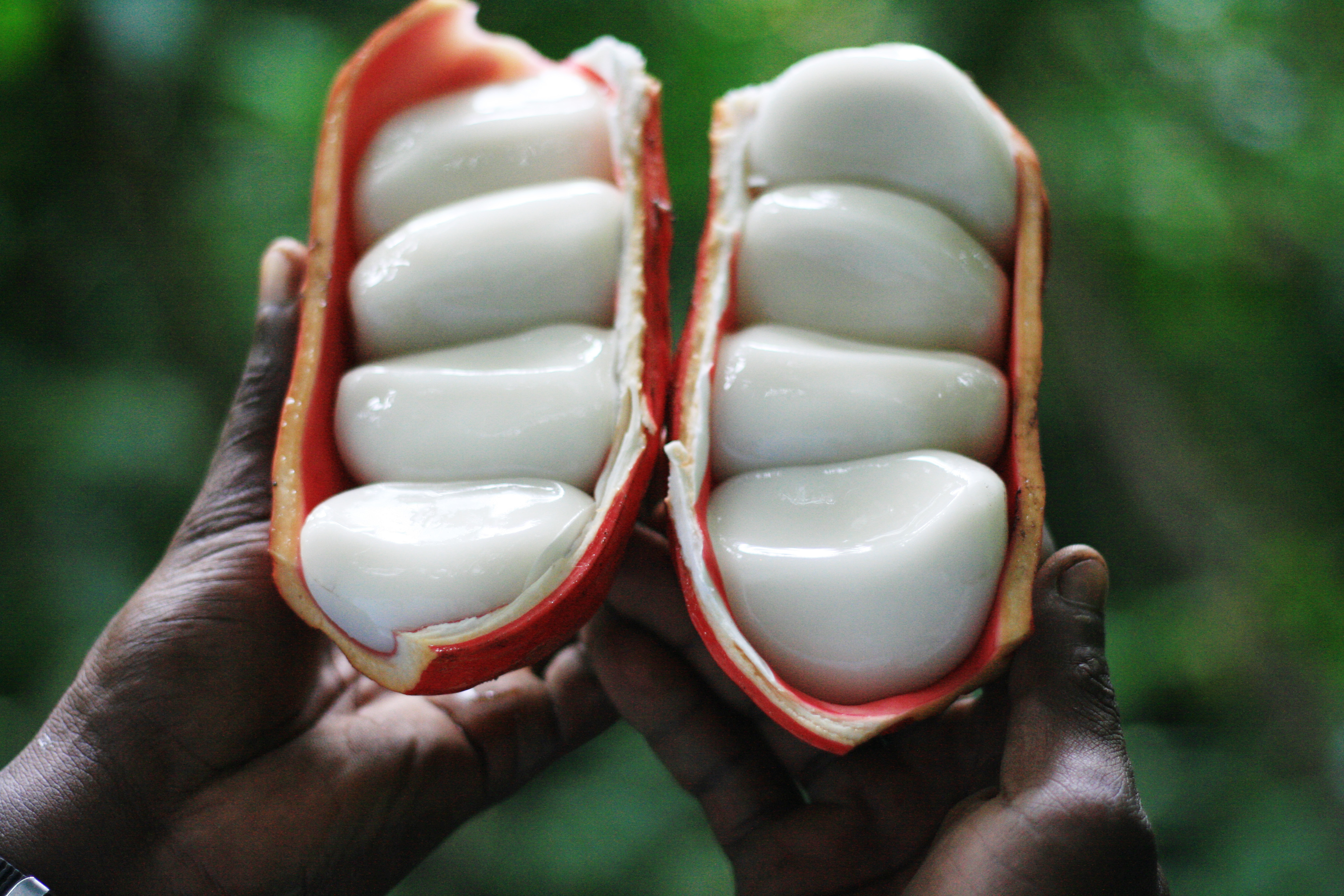
Cola pachycarpa

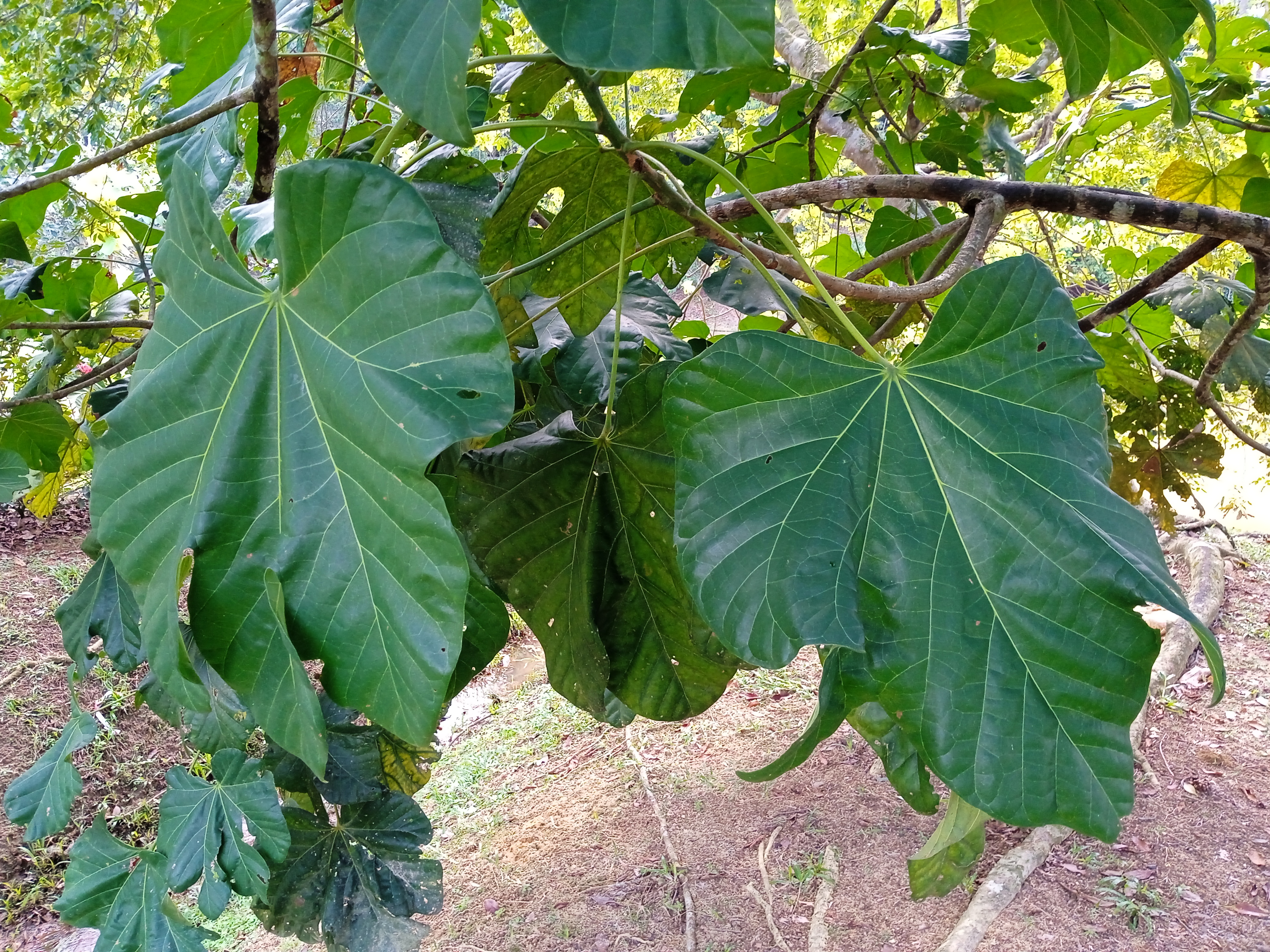
Cola gigantea

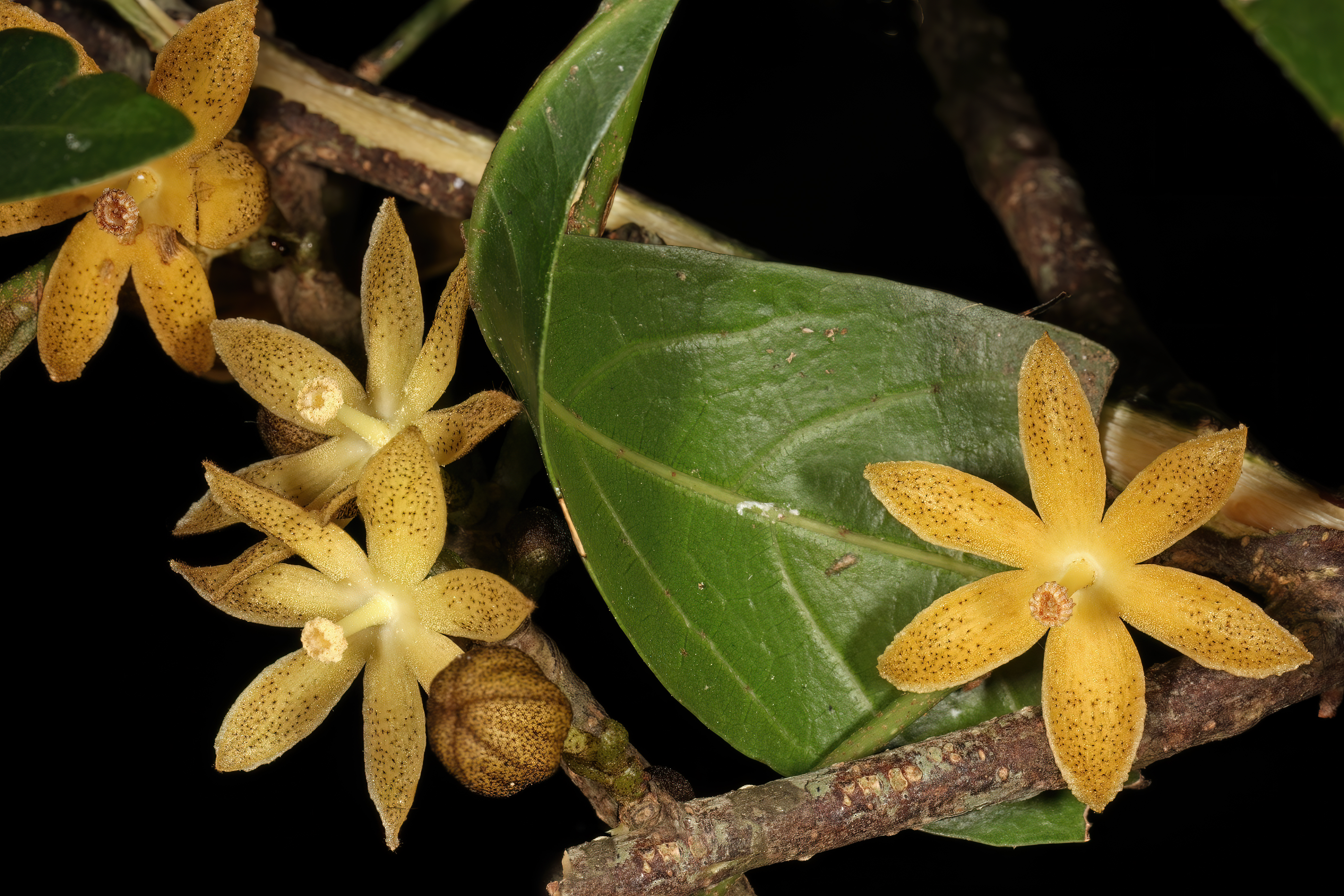
Cola natalensis
