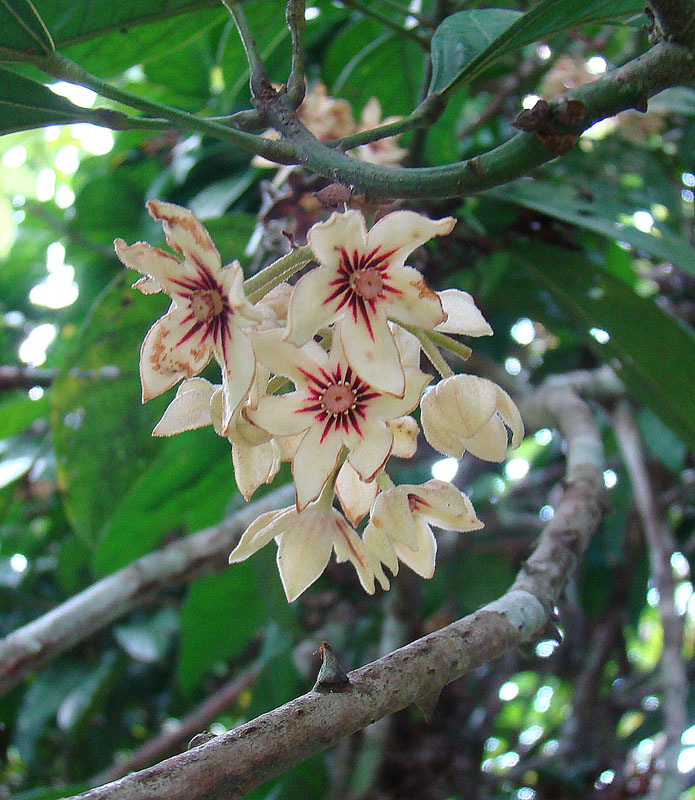

Conservation status
- Least Concern (IUCN 3.1)

Scientific classification
- Kingdom: Plantae
- Clade: Embryophytes
- Clade: Tracheophytes
- Clade: Spermatophytes
- Clade: Angiosperms
- Clade: Eudicots
- Clade: Rosids
- Order: Malvales
- Family: Malvaceae
- Genus: Cola
- Species: C. acuminata

Binomial name
- Cola acuminata (P.Beauv.) Schott & Endl.

Synonyms
- List: Bichea acuminata (P.Beauv.) Farw.; Edwardia acuminata (P.Beauv.) Kuntze; Sterculia acuminata P.Beauv.; Bichea solitaria Stokes; Bichea sulcata Pierre ex A.Chev.; Braxipis grandiflora Raf.; Clompanus longifolia Kuntze; Cola acuminata var. grandiflora (Vent.) K.Schum.; Cola acuminata var. kamerunensis K.Schum.; Cola acuminata var. trichandra K.Schum.; Cola grandiflora (Vent.) Schott & Endl.; Cola ledermannii Engl. & K.Krause; Cola macrocarpa (G.Don) Schott & Endl.; Cola pseudoacuminata Engl.; Colaria acuminata Raf.; Edwardia lurida Raf.; Helicteres paniculata Lour.; Icosinia paniculata (Lour.) Raf.; Lunanea bichy DC.; Siphoniopsis monoica H.Karst.; Southwellia longifolia Raf.; Sterculia grandiflora Vent.; Sterculia macrocarpa G.Don

= Cola acuminata =

Species of plant

Cola acuminata is a species in the genus Cola, of the family Malvaceae, native to tropical Africa. It is generally known for its fruit, the kola nut, chewed as a source of caffeine in West Africa and used to impart the cola flavour in manufactured beverages such as Coca-Cola.

== Description ==
=== Vegetative characteristics ===
The kola tree mainly inhabits lowlands, and is medium-sized with low branches, grey or dark green bark, dark green leaves, and white flowers pollinated by insects. It usually grows to a height of about 13–20 metres (43–66 ft), is hardy to zones 10-12 (USDA), and is vulnerable to frost. The tree prefers moist, sandy, loam or clay soils that are well-drained with neutral acidity. It requires sun exposure and can tolerate drought.

=== Generative characteristics ===
The fruits are rough, mottled and up to 20 cm (8 in) long and contain large, flat and bright red coloured seeds, commonly known as kola nuts. The seed contains 1.25–2.4% caffeine, and can be chewed or ground into a powder added to beverages to increase alertness, diminish fatigue, and increase stamina. These seeds are unusual in having as many as six cotyledons, among the most of any dicot (the vast majority of dicots having two cotyledons).

== Uses ==
Its fruits are harvested from the forests of West Africa. The fruits contain about 2% catechin-caffeine, theobromine and kolatin. They are roasted, pounded or chewed, and can be added to drinks, such as tea or milk, or cereal such as porridge. When the whole nuts are chewed, they have a bitter flavour, but leave a sweet aftertaste that enhances flavour and sweetness of other foods in the meal.

In Africa, kola nuts may be used in traditional medicine or as a food colour, while the wood may be used as fuel, or for making furniture, houses or boats.

== Gallery ==
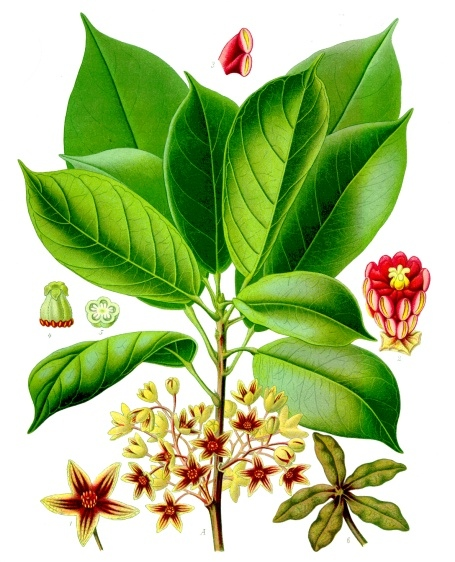
Cola acuminata in flower : coloured plate from Köhler's Medizinal-Pflanzen

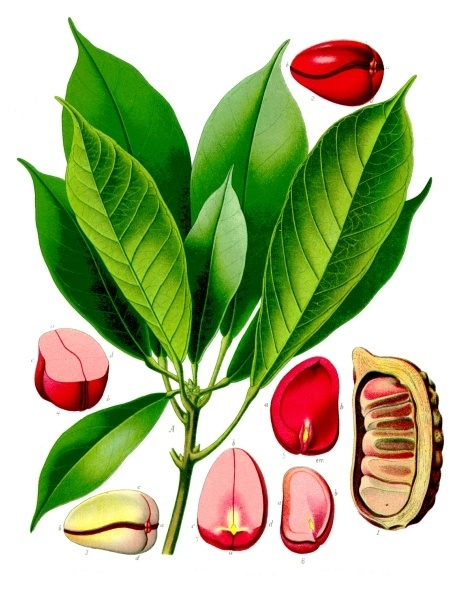
Cola acuminata in fruit, also from Köhler's Medizinal-Pflanzen

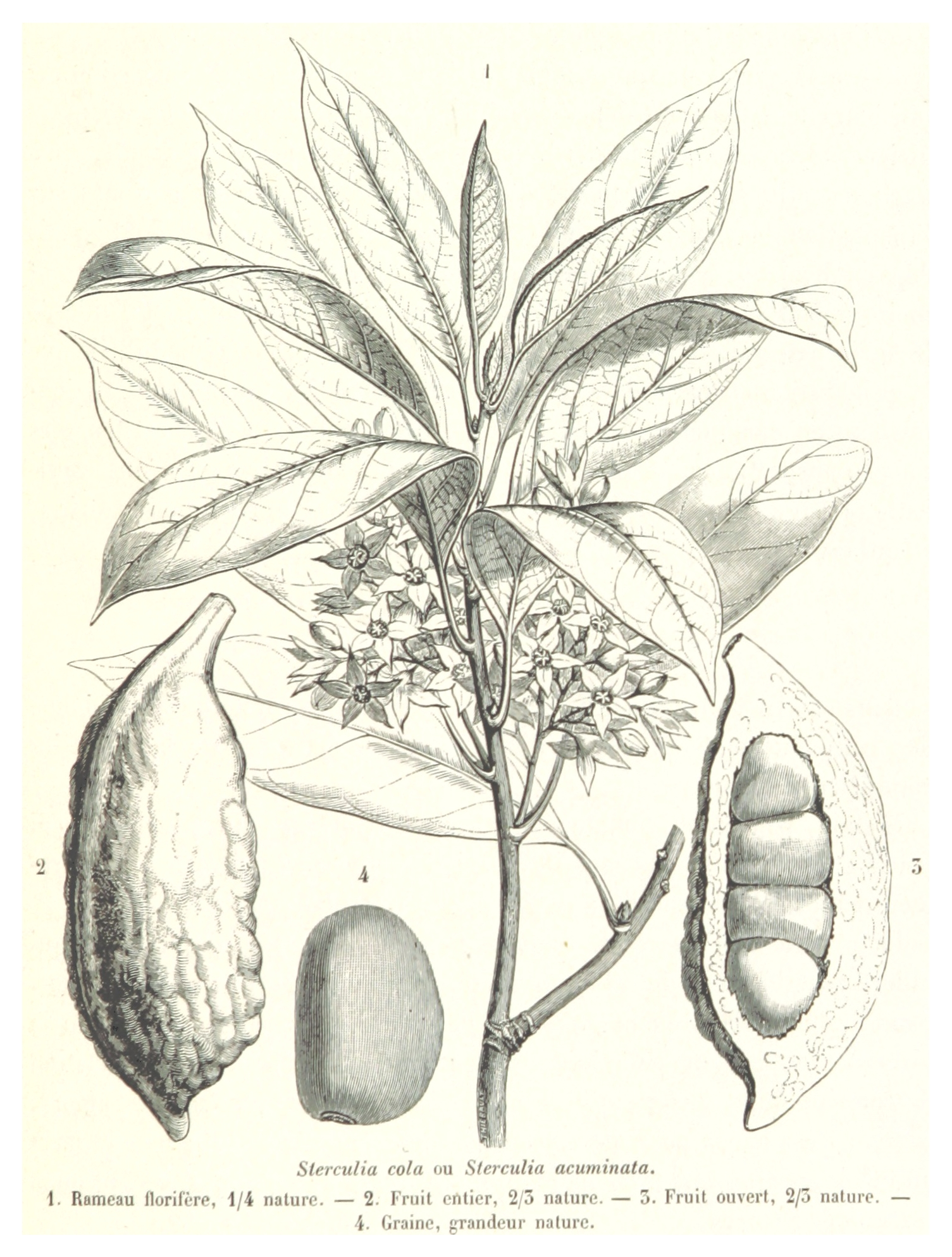
Botanical line drawing of anatomy of C. acuminata, showing warty exterior of pod, from Du Niger au golfe de Guiné..., by Louis Gustave Binger

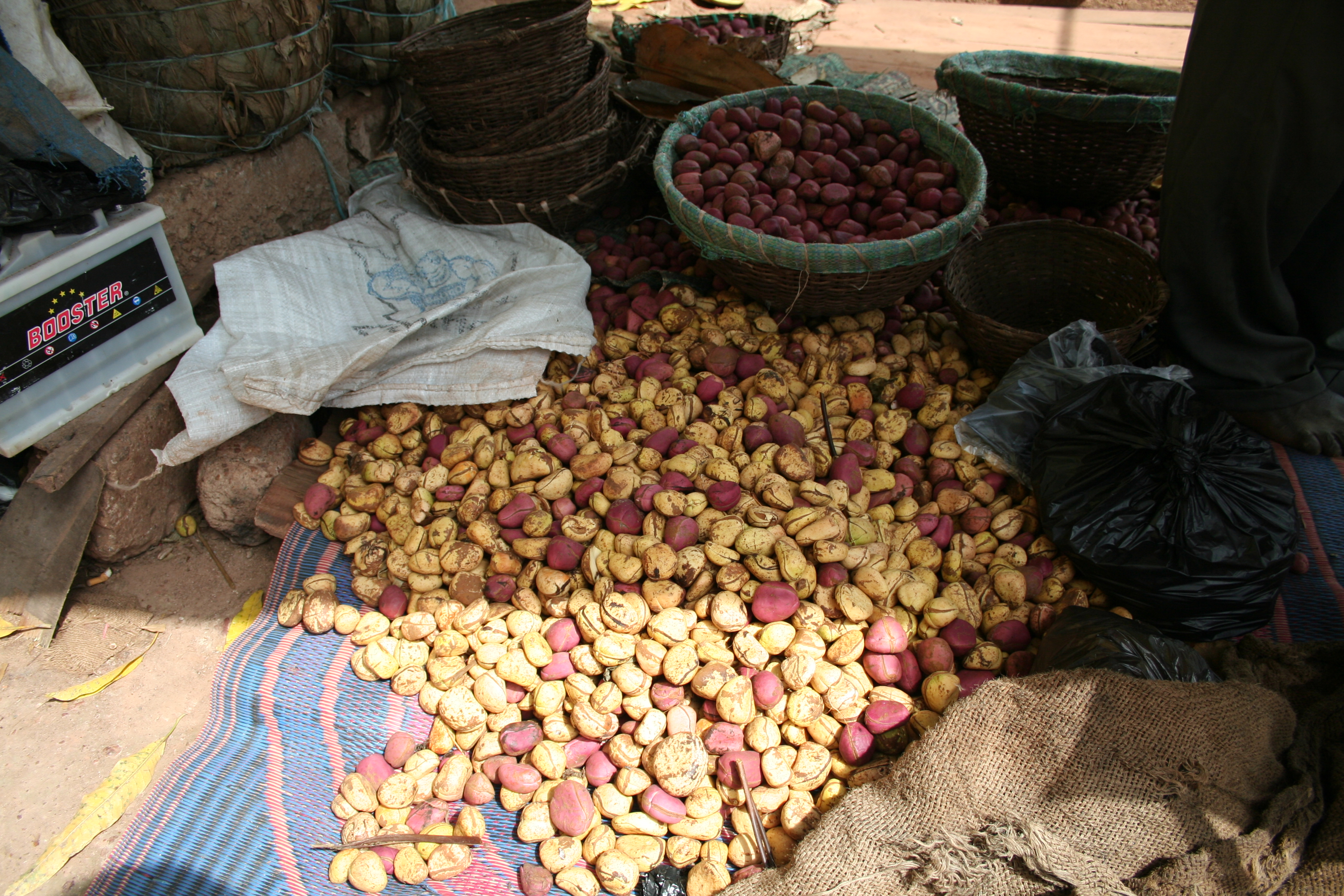
Kola nuts spread out for sale in the central market in Ouagadougou, Burkina Faso

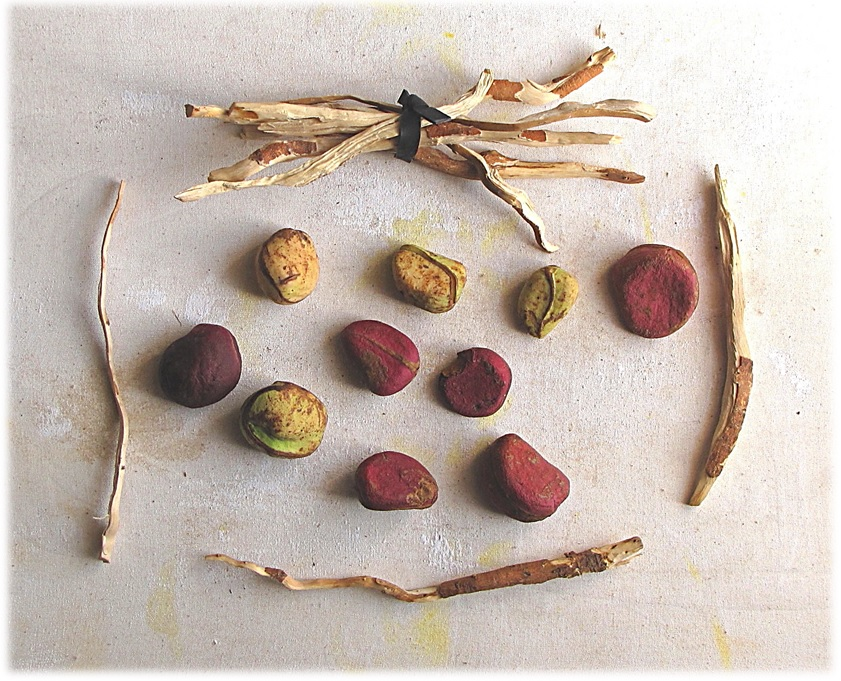
Dried kola nuts and chewing sticks harvested from C. acuminata
