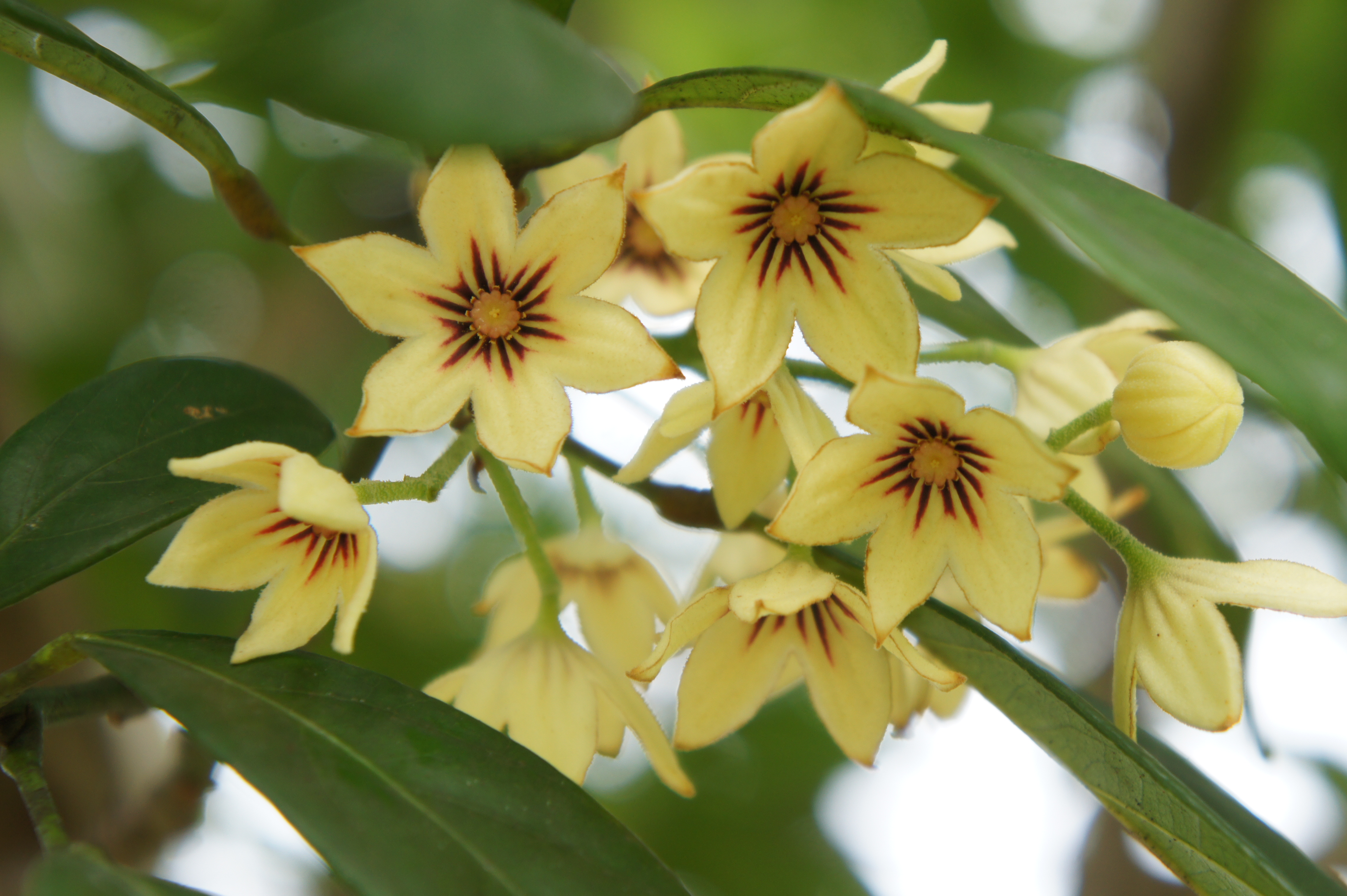

Scientific classification
- Kingdom: Plantae
- Clade: Tracheophytes
- Clade: Angiosperms
- Clade: Eudicots
- Clade: Rosids
- Order: Malvales
- Family: Malvaceae
- Genus: Cola
- Species: C. nitida

Binomial name
- Cola nitida Schott & Endl.

Synonyms
- Bichea nitida (Vent.) Farw.; Cola vera K.Schum; Sterculia nitida Vent.

= Cola nitida =

Species of flowering plant

Cola nitida is a species of plant belonging to the family Malvaceae.

It is a tree native to the rainforests of tropical West Africa. Common names include kola nut, cola, kola. The seeds contain caffeine and are chewed as a stimulant and used in the manufacture of soft drinks. The nuts and other parts of the tree have many uses of a ceremonial nature and in traditional medicine.

== Description ==
Cola nitida is an evergreen tree growing to a height of 12 to 20 metres (39 to 66 ft). The trunk is up to 1.5 m (4 ft 11.1 in) in diameter and older trees develop buttresses. The bark is thick and fibrous, with deep longitudinal fissures. It is grey or brownish-grey, with pinkish-red wood becoming visible when the bark is damaged. The leaves have stalks and are alternate, oblong, glabrous, leathery and tough, with untoothed wavy margins and up to 33 cm (13 in). The flowers have parts in fives. They grow in panicles from the leaf axils and have no petals. Male flowers have a deeply lobed, cup-shaped calyx about 2 cm (0.8 in) in diameter with two whorls of stamens. Female flowers are larger at 5 cm (2.0 in) diameter, with five carpels. The calyx is yellow with red nectar guides. The carpels develop into a fleshy star-shaped aggregate fruit consisting of 5 pods (follicles) of up to 13 cm (5.1 in) long and 7 cm (2.8 in) wide. When ripe, the pods split open to reveal the seeds which consist of a white seed coat covering a pair of fleshy folded cotyledons which are mottled white, reddish-grey or brown. The cotyledons (the kola nut of commerce) are bitter when fresh but become more aromatic as they age.

== Distribution ==
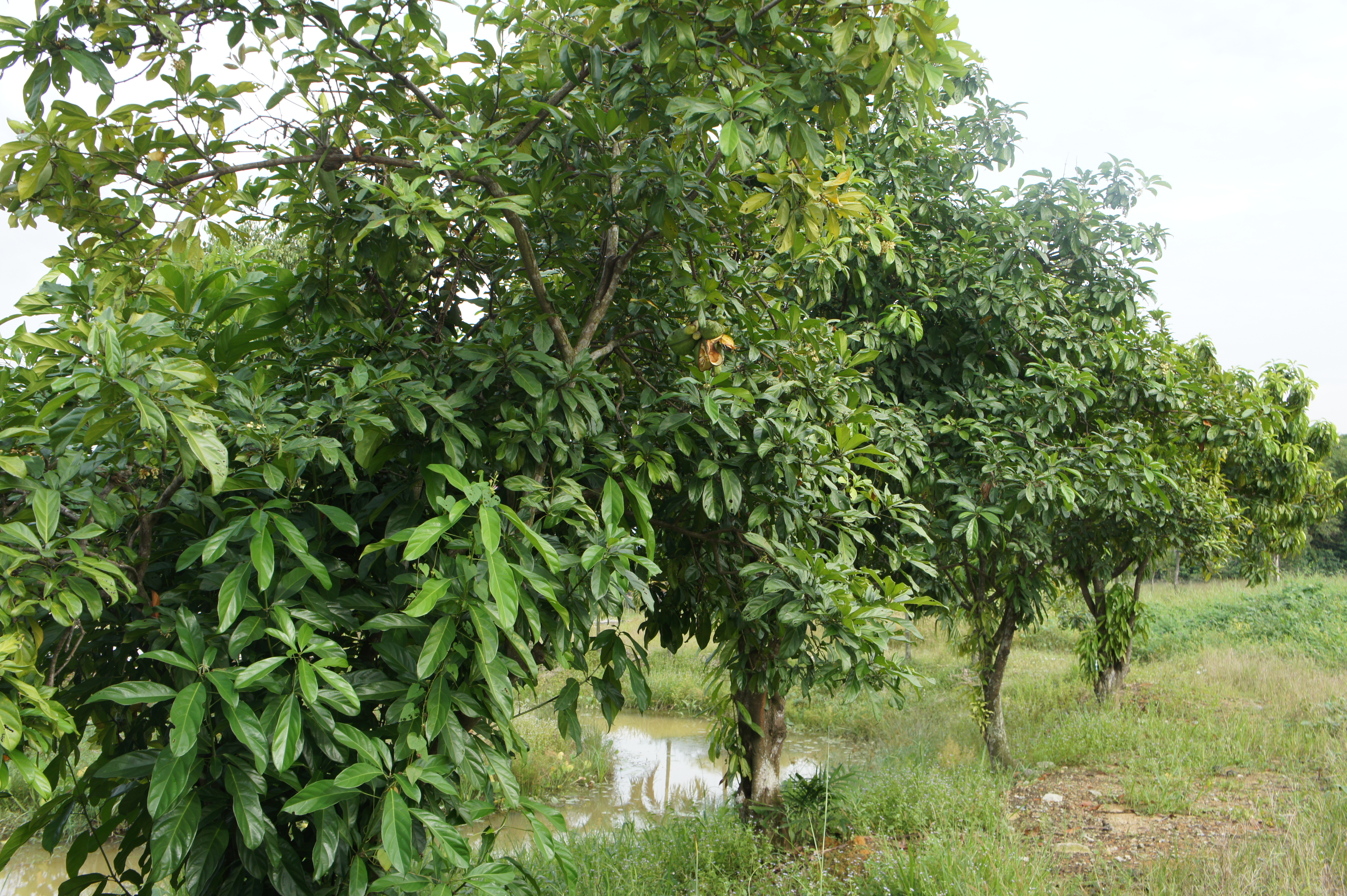
Cultivated trees in Malaysia

Cola nitida is native to Sierra Leone, Liberia, Ivory Coast, Ghana and Nigeria. It is a lowland tree but can be found up to altitudes of about 300 metres (980 ft) in areas with deep, rich soils and evenly distributed rainfall. It has been cultivated in other parts of tropical Africa as well as India, Jamaica, Brazil, and Hawaii. It can grow where there is around 1,200 millimetres (47 in) of rain but does better where the annual rainfall exceeds 1,700 millimetres (67 in), spread across eight months or more. Its temperature range is 23 to 28 °C (73 to 82 °F) and it grows on both light and heavy soils as long as they are deep.

== Uses ==
The nuts contain caffeine, theobromine and tannin. Along with the closely related Cola acuminata, which is also native to West Africa, the trees are cultivated commercially in tropical regions of the world and the nuts used in the manufacture of "cola" drinks. Other ingredients of these drinks include spice oils, other aromatic compounds (sometimes including the leaves of the tree), caramel for colouring, sweeteners, phosphoric or citric acid, and carbon dioxide to provide effervescence.

The nut has traditionally been used as a stimulant when chewed. It is reported to lessen fatigue, prevent hunger pangs, increase mental activity and reduce the need for sleep. Parts of the plant are also used in rituals such as weddings, child naming ceremonies, induction of village chiefs, funerals and sacrificial ceremonies. The leaves, twigs, bark, flowers and nuts are also used in traditional medicine. Cola nitida is closely related to Theobroma cacao, the cocoa tree, and the nuts have been used as a main ingredient for chocolate with a high melting point.

The nut is used in dyeing and water purification. The timber has a use in building work, boat construction, furniture and joinery, musical instruments, utensils and carving. It is also useful as firewood. The pods have been used to make fertiliser and soap, and they can be used as a substitute for up to 60% of the maize in poultry feed.
