= John Patrick Micklethwait Brenan =

British botanist (1917–1985)

- Born: 1917; Chislehurst
- Died: 1985 (aged 67–68); Kew
- Scientific career
- Fields: Botany
- Author abbrev. (botany): Brenan

John Patrick Micklethwait Brenan (1917–1985) was a British botanist who became director of the Royal Botanic Gardens, Kew.

Brenan was born on 19 June 1917 in Chislehurst and died on 26 September 1985 at Kew. A funeral requiem was held on 3 October 1985 at St. Anne's Church, Kew with a memorial service on the 23rd; he is buried at St. Anne's.

Brenan received his Master of Arts in Biology from the University of Oxford in 1940 and began to work at the Imperial Forestry Institute (now the Oxford Forestry Institute) in Oxford. He collected plants from 1947 to 1948 in what is today Zambia and Tanzania.

He began work at the herbarium of the Royal Botanic Gardens, Kew in 1948 and became head of its African section in 1959. He became a member of the Linnean Society of London in 1952. In 1965, he became head of the herbarium and assistant director and became director of the Royal Botanic Gardens, Kew in 1976. He was a member of several learned societies, and was president of the Association of Tropical Botany from 1970 to 1971, and of the Botanical Society of the British Isles in 1982.

His papers are held at the Royal Botanic Gardens, Kew, Library and Archives.

This botanist is denoted by the author abbreviation Brenan when citing a botanical name.

== See also ==
- Brenandendron
- Brenania
- Micklethwaitia
